= Jin Jin (musician) =

- Born: Janée Bennett; Manchester, England
- Genres: Pop; electro; R&B
- Occupations: Musician; singer; songwriter
- Instrument: Vocals
- Years active: 2003–present
- Labels: Moshi Moshi; Parlophone; Jinsing; Raggamuffin
- Website: jinjinofficial.com

Janée Bennett, known professionally as Jin Jin, is an English musician, singer and songwriter from Manchester.

She is known for predominantly writing songs with Jess Glynne, Raye and Jax Jones.

== Career ==
As a child Bennett became interested in music whilst hanging out in her grandfather’s reggae music record shop and enrolled at City College Manchester to do a National Diploma in Music Technology and a Higher National Diploma.

She also studied performance at Stockport's North Cheshire Theatre School, also home to many acclaimed figures such as actress and screenwriter Sally Lindsay, the late Girls Aloud star Sarah Harding, Sweet Female Attitude's Catherine 'Cat' Cassidy and artist JJ Rosa .

Bennett signed to the music publisher Windswept Music UK and completed an undergraduate degree in Music Industry Management and Marketing at Buckinghamshire New University. To see herself through college she modelled for fashion brands including Agent Provocateur and DKNY.

In September 2008, having moved to London, Bennett co-wrote the Roll Deep single "Do Me Wrong", from their album Return of the Big Money Sound. In October 2009, Bennett released her debut single, "Sex in the City", via Moshi Moshi Records; NME magazine described the track as "rude, fresh and kinda brilliant". A version of the single features rapper Tinchy Stryder. Bennett was profiled in The Guardian's "New band of the week" feature the same month, with Paul Lester describing her as "a rougher, cruder version of glossy American R&B" and "a new urban female who is... like a Moss Side Pink if she'd worked with Tinchy instead of Linda Perry".

In October 2013, Bennett issued "Fire Me Up" under her shortened stage name Jin Jin. She collaborated with the band Polar Bear on the song "Cuckoo", released as a single in October 2014.

Bennett is a successful songwriter for others, signed through the UK office to Universal Music Publishing Group worldwide. Bennett discovered the seven times #1 singer Jess Glynne whilst teaching a masterclass at Jess's music college, and went on to collaborate with Glynne on tracks for her debut album. This included Jess Glynne's first official single "Right Here", which was a UK top ten hit in 2014. Bennett co-wrote Glynne's second collaboration with Clean Bandit, "Real Love", as well as "Not Letting Go" featuring Tinie Tempah which topped the UK charts. She also co-wrote Jess Glynne's "Hold My Hand" which was a UK #1 as well as being Jess's first entry on the Billboard Hot 100. The song was also used in an advertisement for Coca-Cola in 2015 and was featured on the original movie soundtrack for the 2016 film, Bridget Jones's Baby. She also co-wrote 10 tracks on Jess’s second album Always In Between. Both of Jess’s albums have topped the charts, and Jin Jin was nominated for an Ivor Novello and won a BMI Award for her writing on ‘Hold My Hand’. Jess’s debut album I Cry When I Laugh is now 4 x Platinum in the UK alone.

In 2018 her co-write with Raye & Jax Jones "You Don't Know Me" was nominated for a BRIT Award, and has now racked up upwards of 400 million streams. She recently picked up a BMI award for "Home With You" by Madison Beer. Other notable recent successes include "Lullaby" by Sigala and Paloma Faith, which was in the top 10 biggest songs of 2018 and went Platinum in the UK, and "Alien" by Jonas Blue and Sabrina Carpenter which reached #1 on the Billboard Dance Chart.

Jin Jin has collaborated with a host of international producers and artists such as Stephen Di Genius, Fraser T. Smith, Toby Gad, Diplo, and David Guetta, and artists Jess Glynne, Jax Jones, Raye, Paloma Faith & Sigala. Further collaborations include Jonas Blue & Sabrina Carpenter, Madison Beer, Yebba, Sean Paul, Rita Ora, Clean Bandit, Nina Nesbitt, Craig David, Gary Barlow and most recently break-through artists Hailee Steinfeld and Becky G Jin Jin co-wrote the 2021 UEFA Champions League x Pepsi anthem ‘Rotate’ by Burna Boy and Becky G, and Jax Jones 'Phases' which featured on the Pokémon 25th Anniversary Soundtrack in 2021.

In 2015 Bennett set up her own publishing company, Raggamuffin Music, in conjunction with Bucks Music Group. A few years later she set up Jinsing, a label and management company with a publishing arm that is a joint venture with Universal Music Publishing. She recently won the Music Creative Award at the UK's Women In Music event. The award was presented to her by long time friend and collaborator Jess Glynne. Jin Jin is now also a Senior A&R manager at Parlophone Records and joined the board of Directors of The Ivors Academy in 2020.

== Personal life ==
Jin Jin is the daughter of former Sunderland footballer Gary Bennett.

== Songwriting credits ==
Title	Year	Artist(s)	Album	Written with:
"Right Here"	2014	Jess Glynne	I Cry When I Laugh	Jessica Glynne, Kye Gibbon, Matthew Robson-Scott
"Real Love" (with Jess Glynne)	2014	Clean Bandit	New Eyes / I Cry When I Laugh	Jack Patterson, Grace Chatto, Jessica Glynne, Richard Boardman, Robert Harvey, Cleo Tighe, Sarah Blanchard
"Drunk and Incapable"	2014	Krishane	Non-album single	Dominic Macallister, Gareth Keane, Krishane Murray, Ryan Griffiths, Theodoulos Doukanaris
"Hold My Hand"	2015	Jess Glynne	I Cry When I Laugh	Jessica Glynne, Jack Patterson, Ina Wroldsen
"Not Letting Go" (featuring Jess Glynne)	2015	Tinie Tempah	Youth / I Cry When; I Laugh	Patrick Okogwu, Krishane Murray, Jessica Glynne, Gareth Keane, Lewis Jankel, Jermaine Jackson
"Gave Me Something"	2015	Jess Glynne	I Cry When I Laugh	Jessica Glynne, Andrew Knox Brown, Finlay Dow-Smith
"Ain't Got Far to Go"	2015	Jess Glynne	I Cry When I Laugh	Jessica Glynne, Andrew Knox Brown, Finlay Dow-Smith
"Love Me"	2015	Jess Glynne	I Cry When I Laugh	Jessica Glynne, Andrew Knox Brown
"No Rights No Wrongs"	2015	Jess Glynne	I Cry When I Laugh	Jessica Glynne, Andrew Knox Brown, Finlay Dow-Smith, Jonathan Coffer, James Newman
"Home"	2015	Jess Glynne	I Cry When I Laugh	Jessica Glynne, Gareth Keane
"Bad Blood"	2015	Jess Glynne	I Cry When I Laugh	Jessica Glynne, Gareth Keane, Peter Connolly, Santosh Anand, Anu Malik
"Grown"	2015	Little Mix	Get Weird	Perrie Edwards, Jessica Nelson, Leigh-Anne Pinnock, Jade Thirlwall, Camille Purcell, Edvard Forre Erfjord, Henrik Barman Michelsen, Jessica Glynne
"Like That"	2015	Fleur East	Love, Sax and Flashbacks	Fleur East, Fraser Thornycroft-Smith, Ina Wroldsen, Ash Soan, Benjamin Epstein
"Scar"	2016	Foxes	All I Need	Louisa Rose Allen, Kenneth Edmonds, Antonio Dixon, Khristopher Riddick-Tynes, Jonathan Saxe
"Need Somebody"	2016	Alex Newell	Non-album single	Brandyn Burnette, Daniel Heloy Davidsen, Peter Wallevik, Mich Hansen
"Mamacita" (featuring Wizkid)	2016	Tinie Tempah	Youth	Patrick Okogwu, Marlysse Simmons, St. Aubyn Levy, Reinaldo Alvarez, Ayodeji Balogun
"Keep It Moving"	2016	Alex Newell	Non-album single	Brandyn Burnette, Daniel Heloy Davidsen, Peter Wallevik, Mich Hansen
"24 HRS"	2016	Olly Murs	24 Hrs	Oliver Murs, Steve Robson, Clarence Coffee Jr.
"How Much for Your Love"	2016	Olly Murs	24 Hrs	Oliver Murs, Steve Robson, Clarence Coffee Jr.
"You Don't Know Me" (featuring Raye)	2016	Jax Jones	Snacks EP	Timucin Aluo, Uzoechi Emenike, Rachel Keen, Walter Merzinger, Arno Kammermeier, Peter Hayo, Patrick Bodmer, Philip D. Young
"Don't Want You Back" (featuring Kiesza)	2017	Bakermat	Non-album single	Lodewijk Fluttert, Clifford Goilo, Komi Al-Hakam, Tamera Foster
"We Could Go Back" (featuring Moelogo)	2017	Jonas Blue	Blue	Guy James Robin, Edvard Forre Erfjord, Henrik Barman Michelsen
"Evergreen"	2017	YEBBA	Non-album single	Abbey Smith, George Moore
"Decline" (with Mr Eazi)	2017	Raye	Side Tape	Rachel Keen, Fraser Thornycroft-Smith, Oluwatosin Adjibade, Marcus Vest, Jeffrey Atkins, Irving Lorenzo
"My Body"	2017	Paloma Faith	The Architect	Paloma Faith, Andrew Knox Brown, Finlay Dow-Smith
"Love Divine" (featuring Moko)	2017	Sub Focus	Non-album single	Nicholas Douwma, Philip Thomas, Nadia Adu-Gyamfi, Uzoechi Emenike, John Gillivray, Christopher Lane
"Proud"	2018	Rita Ora	Non-album single	Rita Ora, Fridolin Walcher
"Home with You"	2018	Madison Beer	As She Pleases EP	Madison Beer, Leroy Clampitt, Rachel Keen, Frederik Gibson
"Lullaby" (with Paloma Faith)	2018	Sigala	Brighter Days	Bruce Fielder, Jessica Glynne, Andrew Bullimore, Joshua Record, Paloma Faith
"Alien" (with Jonas Blue)	2018	Sabrina Carpenter	Singular: Act I	Sabrina Carpenter, Guy James Robin
"Check" (featuring Raye)	2018	Kojo Funds	Golden Boy	Errol Bellot, Rachel Keen, Gabriel Kusimo
"Wife Me" (with Steel Banglez)	2018	Raye	Side Tape	Rachel Keen, Pahuldip Sandhu, Joseph Ellis
"Feels Like Home" (with Sean Paul & Fuse ODG featuring Kent Jones)	2018	Sigala	Brighter Days	Bruce Fielder, Sean Henriques, Nana Abiona, Daryl Kent Jones
"You Don't Know Me" (with Flo Rida & Shaun Frank featuring Delaney Jane)	2018	Sigala	Brighter Days	Bruce Fielder, Shaun Frank, Mich Hansen, Daniel Heløy Davidsen, Peter Wallevik, Tramar Dillard
"Friends"	2018	Raye	Non-album single	Rachel Keen, Frederik Gibson, Mark Ralph, Kyle Shearer, Nathaniel Campany
"Blind"	2018	Four of Diamonds	Non-album single	Fridolin Walcher, Gareth Keane, Mabel McVey, Steven Hurley
"All I Am"	2018	Jess Glynne	Always In Between	Jessica Glynne, Bastian Langebaek, James Newman, Sophie Cooke, Sandy Rivera, Jay Sealee
"No One"	2018	Jess Glynne	Always In Between	Jessica Glynne, Tobias Gad
"123"	2018	Jess Glynne	Always In Between	Jessica Glynne, Jordan Thomas, James Newman, Jonathan Mensah
"Hate/Love"	2018	Jess Glynne	Always In Between	Jessica Glynne, Bastian Langebaek
"Won't Say No"	2018	Jess Glynne	Always In Between	Jessica Glynne, Finlay Dow-Smith, Clarence Coffee Jr.
"Rollin'"	2018	Jess Glynne	Always In Between	Jessica Glynne, Frederik Gibson
"Nevermind"	2018	Jess Glynne	Always In Between	Jessica Glynne, Cass Lowe
"Insecurities"	2018	Jess Glynne	Always In Between	Jessica Glynne, Tobias Gad
"Never Let Me Go"	2018	Jess Glynne	Always In Between	John Ryan, Julian Bunetta, Jamie Scott, Jessica Glynne
"So Real (Warriors)" (vs. KDA featuring Jess Glynne)	2018	Too Many Zooz	Always In Between	Leo Pellegrino, Matthew Muirhead, David Parks, Kris Di Angelis, Jordan Johnson, Stefan Johnson, Marcus Lomax, Alexander Izquerdio, Jessica Glynne, Ivan Rosenburg
"Thank You"	2018	Lena	Only Love, L	BeatGees, Fraser Thornycroft-Smith, Jessica Glynne, Lena Meyer-Landrut, Simon Triebel
"Old Friend"	2018	Elderbrook	Old Friend EP	Alexander Kotz, Fridolin Walcher
"Baby" (feat. Kid Ink)	2018	Yogi, Maleek Berry, RAY BLK	Non-album single	Alexander Lewis, Brian Collins Jr, David Phelps, Ivan Rosenberg, Joseph Cabera, Ken Gold, Maleek Shoyebi, Mark Ralph, Matthew Walker, Michale Denne, Rita Ekwere, Yogi Tulsiani
"Love Letter"	2019	Nina Nesbitt	The Sun Will Come Up, The Seasons Will Change	Nina Nesbitt, Fraser Thornycroft-Smith
"Put Your Phone Down (Low)"	2019	Jack Back	Non-album single	David Guetta, Raye, Camille Purcell, Timofey Reznikov
"Wasted Nights"	2019	ONE OK ROCK	Eye Of The Storm	Takahiro Moriuchi, Peter Nappi, Jamil Kazmi
"Giants"	2019	ONE OK ROCK	Eye Of The Storm	Takahiro Moriuchi, Mark Crew, Jamil Kazmi
"All The Lies"	2019	Alok, Felix Jaehn & The Vamps (British band)	Non-album single	Alok Achkar Peres Petrillo, Anders Froen, Felix Jaehn, Bradley Will Simpson, Ohyes, Vincent Kottamp
"Brave"	2019	Don Diablo & Jessie J	Non-album single	Frances (musician), James Richard Newman, Don P Schipper, Martijn H J Sonderen, Edvard Foerre Erfjord, Jess Glynne, Henrick Barman Michelsen
"How Do You"	2019	Elderbrook	Non-album single	Thomas Wesley Pentz, Alexander Harry Kotz, Grace Martine Tandon, Maximilian Jaeger, Robert Clifton III Brackins
"When You Know What Love Is"	2019	Craig David	Non-album single	Craig David, Gary Barlow, Fraser T Smith
"One Touch"	2019	Jess Glynne & Jax Jones	Snacks EP	Jax Jones, MNEK, Jess Glynne, Mark Stuart Ralph
"Exit Sign"	2019	Kah-Lo	Non-album single	Faridah Seriki, Ashley Peter Milton, Daniel James Denis Goudie
"Bonita"	2019	Donea'O feat. Stylo G	Non-album single	Jonas Blue, Jason Andre Mcdermott, Ian Michael Greenidge
"Do You Miss Me Much"	2019	Craig David	Non-album single	Gary Barlow, Craig David, Fraser Lance Thorneycroft
"Love Me Again"	2019	Raye	Non-album single	Raye
"Love Me Again (Remix) "	2019	Raye, Jess Glynne	Non-album single	Jess Glynne, Raye
"We Got Love" (featuring Ella Henderson)	2019	Sigala	Non-album single	Joakim Sebastian Hasselquist Jarl, Ella Henderson, Derrick May, Michael James, Anne-Marie Nicholson, Bruce Fielder, Thomas Michael Jules
"TING TING TING" (with Oliver Heldens)	2020	Itzy	It'z Me	Oliver Heldens, Oak Felder
"My Man"	2020	Becky G	Non-album single	Akil C. King, Andrea Elena Mangimarchi, Edgar Barrera, Jenni Rivera, Maurice "Verse" Simmonds, Rebbeca Marie Gomez, Stephen McGregor
"Tequila"	2020	Jax Jones, Martin Solveig, Raye	Europa	Mark Stuart Ralph, Rachel Keen, Timucian Kwong Wah Lam, Uzoechi Osisioma Emenike, Martin Solveig
"Feel Right Now" (featuring Nonô)	2020	Parx	Non-album single	Harold Faltermeyer, Rachel Keen, Alexander Frederick Cramp
"Your Name Hurts"	2020	Hailee Steinfeld	Half Written Story	Stephen Noel Kozmeniuk, Hailee Steinfeld, Caroline Ades Pennell, Elizabeth Boland
"Day One"	2020	Double S, Sticky	Non-album single	Bashir Bazanye, Nadine Dorothy Samuels, Reiss Hanson, Richard Forbes, Theodoulos Pavlos Doukanaris
"Felt Cute"	2020	Le Cheval	Non-album single	Amber Van Day, Camden Cox, Devin The Great, Molly Ashcroft, Niamh Murphy, Pringle Dan, Sami Chokri
"Zanotti"	2020	NSG	Roots	Abdul Arowosaye, Ayodeji Mujib Shekoni, Dennis Mensah, Jonathan Mensah, Matthew Ojo, Patrick Brew, William Mensah
"Lie For You" (featuring A Boogie wit da Hoodie & Davido)	2020	Snakehips & Jess Glynne	Non-album single	Artist Dubose, David Adeleke, Edvard Førre Erfjord, Henrik Barman Michelsen, James David, Jess Glynne, Oliver Dickinson
"Chapter 1"	2020	Octavian	Rari (Chapter 1)	Jim-E Stack, Octavian
"More Life" (feat. Tinie Tempah & L Devine)	2020	Torren Foot	Non-album single	Michael McEwan, Nick Hahn, Patrick Okogwu, Torren Foot
"NICOTINE"	2020	Grey	Non-album single	Kyle Trewartha, Michael Trewartha
"Back To My Bed"	2020	Elderbrook	Why Do We Shake In The Cold?	Alexander Kotz, Christopher Tempest, Corey James, Edvard Erfjord, Henrik Michelsen, Sanders Tempest
"Wired" (with Ella Eyre)	2020	Sonny Fodera	Non-album single	Ben Kohn, Ella Eyre, Pete Kelleher, Sonny Fodera, Tom Barnes
"i miss u" (with Au/Ra)	2020	Jax Jones	Non-album single	Cass Lowe, Ina Wroldsen, Olav Tronsmoen, Timucin Lam
"Pa Ti" Spanglish Version	2020	Jennifer Lopez, Maluma	Pa Ti + Lonely	Andrea Elena Mangimarchi, Edgar Barrera, Jennifer Lopez, Jon Leone, Juan Luis Londoño Arias, Nathaniel Campany
"Naughty List" (with Dixie D'Amelio)	2020	Liam Payne	Non-album single	Ben Kohn, Ed Drewett, Ella Henderson, Pete Kelleher, Tom Barnes
"A Mess (Happy 4 U)"	2020	Little Mix	Confetti (Little Mix album)	Cass Lowe, Jade Thirlwall, Leigh-Anne Pinnock, Perrie Edwards
"All Dressed Up"	2020	Raye	Euphoric Sad Songs	Benjamin Alexander Kohn, Pete Kelleher, Tom Barnes, Rachel Keen
"Rotate"	2021	Becky G, Burna Boy	Non-album single	Damini Ebunoluwa Ogulu, Elena Rose, Nate Campany, Pierre-Antoine Melki, Raphaël Judrin, Rebbeca Marie Gomez, Stephen McGregor
"BED"	2021	Joel Corry, Raye, David Guetta	Non-album single	David Guetta, Giorgio Tuinfort, Joel Corry, Lewis Thompson, Neave Applebaum, Rachel Keen
"Renegades"	2021	ONE OK ROCK	Luxury Disease	Takahiro Moriuchi, Ed Sheeran, Masato Hayakawa, David Pramik
"Love Line" (with Tinashe)	2021	Shift K3Y	Non-album single	Fridolin Walcher, Lewis Jankel, Rachael Keen, Tinashe Kachingwe
"One By One" (feat Elderbrook & Andhim)	2021	Diplo	Non-album single	Alexander Kotz, Simon Haehnel, Thomas Wesley Pentz, Tobias Müller
"No Sleep"	2021	Jodie Harsh	Non-album single	Jay Clarke, Samuel George Lewis
"Feel So Good" (feat Local)	2021	JKAY	Non-album single	Dom McAllister, Jon Keep, Local, Marvin Humes, Richard Sheppard
"Candy"	2021	Kah-Lo	The Arrival EP	Daniel Gleyzer, Faridah Demola-Seriki
"OUT OUT" (feat. Charli XCX & Saweetie)	2021	Joel Corry, Jax Jones	Non-album single	Amber Van Day, Charli XCX, Jax Jones, Joel Corry, Kamille Purcell, Lewis Thompson, Låpsley, Neave Applebaum, Nonô, RØRY, Saweetie, Stromae
"Style & Fashion" (feat. Obongjayar)	2021	Pa Salieu	Afrikan Rebel	Felix Joseph, Obongjayar, Pa Salieu, Pheelz, Silky
"You" (feat. Sam Tompkins)	2021	Sonny Fodera	Wide Awake	Sam Tompkins, Sonny Fodera, Theodoulos Pavlos Doukanaris
"Wonder"	2021	ONE OK ROCK	Luxury Disease	Takahiro Moriuchi, Masato Hayakawa, David Pramik
"Work It"	2021	Billon	Non-album single	Camden Aimee Kraye Cox, Edward Conor James Butler, George Hammond-Hagan, John Hammond-Hagan, Michelle Escoffery, Theodoulos Pavlos Doukanaris
"Between Us"	2021	Little Mix	Non-album single	Jade Thirlwall, Leigh-Anne Pinnock, Perrie Edwards, Tre Jean-Marie, Uzoechi Emenike
"somebody"	2021	Grace Davies	i wonder if you wonder EP	Sophie Frances Cooke, Grace Davies
"Phases"	2021	Jax Jones, Sinéad Harnett	Pokémon 25: The Album	Cleo Tighe, Cass Lowe, Timucin Lam
"Vroom" (from Gran Turismo 7)	2022	Davido, Idris Elba, Koffee, Moelogo, The FaNaTiX	Non-album single	Adrian Francis, Curtis James, David Adeleke, Idris Elba, Mikayla Simpson, Mohammed Basit Abiola Isola Animashaun, Tione Jayden Merritt
"How We Do It" (feat. Pia Mia)	2022	Sean Paul	Non-album single	Clarence Bernard Coffee, Nyann "News" Lodge, Rachel Keen, Sean Paul, Yannick Rastogi, Zacharie Raymond
"Different Kinds of People"	2022	Bimini	Non-album single	Benjy, Bimini, Harvey Kikrby, Rhys Kirkby-Cox
"Serotonin Moonbeams"	2022	The Blessed Madonna	Non-album single	Adam Kaye, Barbara Burton, Charles Burton, Marea Stamper, Sam Knowles, Suzanne Vega, Uffie
"It's All Love"	2022	Craig David & Toddla T	Non-album single	Adrian McLeod, Craig David, Toddla T
"Extremes"	2022	Alan Walker, Trevor Daniel	Non-album single	Alan Walker, Carla Cappa, Johnny Goldstein, Kasper, Trevor Daniel Neill
"Bad Like We"	2022	Wiley, Nicki Minaj, Popcaan, Dyo	Non-album single	Rymez, Richard Kylea Cowie Jr., Andrae Hugh Sutherland, Onika Maraj, Dayo Olatunji
"Living Without You"	2022	Sigala, David Guetta, Sam Ryder	There's Nothing but Space, Man!	Joakim Jarl, Bruce Fielder, David Guetta, Eddie Serifica, James Terence Murray, Mustafa Omer, Tom Grennan
"Special Delivery" (feat. MAX)	2023	Meghan Trainor	Takin' It Back Deluxe	Federico Vindver, Maxwell Schneider, Meghan Trainor
"Put Your Hands Up"	2023	Marvin Humes	Non-album single	Bryan Cox, Caroline Alvares, Iain James, Jermaine Dupri, Usher Raymond
"Freetown"	2023	Kara Marni, Big Zuu	Non-album single	Jacob Manson, Kara Marni, Zuhair Hassan
"Oops"	2023	Oliver Heldens, Karen Harding	Non-album single	Karen Harding, Max Martin, Alexandra Kollontai Mills, Alison Moyet, Dom Liu, Lenno Linjama, Nicole Blair, Oliver Heldens, Paul John Harris, Rami Yacoub, Sean Mac, Vince Clarke
"learnt to love goodbyes"	2023	Cat Burns	emotionally unavailable	Cat Burns, George Moore
"we, diamonds"	2023	Dawn Richard	new breed	Dawn Richard, PRGRSHN
"Hectic"	2023	Jodie Harsh	Non-album single	Neave Applebaum, Pablo Bowman, Alexander Cramp, David Marvin Blake, Eve Jeffers, Jay Clarke, Miggy De La Rosa, Nathaniel D Hale
"Flip Phone"	2023	Brooke Candy	Non-album single	BOBBIE, Brooke Candy, Lucia Fairfull, Jesse Saint John
"Bow Down"	2023	Ivorian Doll	Non-album single	Lei Jennings, Vanessa Mahi
"Big Bad IVD"	2023	Ivorian Doll	Non-album single	Christopher Layton, Ellis Taylor, Jacqueline Pelham-Leigh, Lei Jenning, Vanessa Mahi
"Car Keys (Ayla)"	2023	Alok, Ava Max	Non-album single	Amana Ava Koci, Fridolin Walcher, Henry Walter, Ingo Kunzi, Madison Love, Oliver Heldens, Rachel Keen
"Stars"	2023	PNAU, Bebe Rexha, Ozuna	Non-album single	Bebe Rexha, Jan Carlos Ozuna Rosado, Nicholas Littlemore, Peter Mayes, Sam Littlemore, Yazid Rivera
"Must Have Been Love"	2023	Albert Harvey	Non-album single	Albert Harvey, Per Gessle
"Feed Your Soul"	2023	Josh Dorey	Non-album single	Clementine Douglas
"I Love You" (feat. Sissy Ford)	2024	Billen Ted, TeeDee	Non-album single	Dylan Mills, Lauren Keen, Sam Brennan, Sissy Ford, TeeDee, Tom Hollings
"Enough"	2024	Jess Glynne	Jess	Dyo, Greg Kurstin, Jess Glynne, Knox Brown, P2J
"Edge of Saturday Night"	2024	The Blessed Madonna, Kylie Minogue	Godspeed	The Blessed Madonna, Kylie Minogue, Raye
"Relentless Love"	2025	Sophie Ellis-Bextor	Perimenopop	Sophie Ellis-Bextor, Baz Kaye, Samuel Knowles

== Artist discography ==
- "Do Me Wrong" (2008) Roll Deep feat. Janée “Jin Jin” Bennett
- "Touch My" (2009) Mos Wanted Mega feat. Janée “Jin Jin” Bennett
- "Sex in the City" (2009)
- "Cashpoint Drama" (2012) (feat. Mikill Pane)
- "Love in Sin City" (2012)
- "Whistle at Me" (2012) (feat. Wiley)
- "Fire Me Up" (2013)
- "Cuckoo" (2014) Polar Bear with Janée “Jin Jin” Bennett
- "Break Loose" (2015) Televisor feat. Janée “Jin Jin” Bennett & Splitbreed
