= List of top 10 singles in 2018 (Ireland) =

This is a list of singles that have peaked in the top 10 of the Irish Singles Chart during 2018, as compiled by the Official Charts Company on behalf of the Irish Recorded Music Association.

== Top-ten singles ==
Key

Symbol	Meaning
◁	Indicates single's top 10 entry was also its Irish Singles Chart top 100 debut

Artist(s)	Single	Peak	Peak date	Weeks at #1	Ref.
MK	"17"	9	12 January	-	
Rita Ora	"Anywhere"	4	12 January	-	
Clean Bandit featuring Julia Michaels	"I Miss You"	3	12 January	-	
Camila Cabello	"Never Be the Same"	6	19 January	-	
Dua Lipa	"IDGAF"	1	26 January	1	
Drake	"God's Plan" ◁	1	2 February	10	
Jax Jones featuring Ina Wroldsen	"Breathe"	4	9 February	-	
Bruno Mars and Cardi B	"Finesse"	5	16 February	-	
Kendrick Lamar and SZA	"All the Stars"	4	16 February	-	
Rudimental featuring Jess Glynne, Macklemore and Dan Caplen	"These Days"	2	23 February	-	
Sigrid	"Strangers"	7	2 March	-	
Post Malone featuring Ty Dolla Sign	"Psycho" ◁	2	2 March	-	
Ramz	"Barking"	8	2 March	-	
Marshmello and Anne-Marie	"Friends"	3	16 March	-	
Zedd, Maren Morris and Grey	"The Middle"	7	16 March	-	
Picture This	"This Morning" ◁	6	30 March	-	
The Weeknd	"Call Out My Name" ◁	5	6 April	-	
Portugal. The Man	"Feel It Still"	10	6 April	-	
Calvin Harris and Dua Lipa	"One Kiss" ◁	1	13 April	9	
Khalid and Normani	"Love Lies"	8	20 April	-	
Lil Dicky featuring Chris Brown	"Freaky Friday"	3	20 April	-	
Drake	"Nice for What" ◁	2	20 April	-	
George Ezra	"Paradise"	5	27 April	-	
Sigala and Paloma Faith	"Lullaby"	8	27 April	-	
Ariana Grande	"No Tears Left to Cry" ◁	1	27 April	1	
Post Malone	"Better Now" ◁	4	4 May	-	
Post Malone	"Paranoid" ◁	7	4 May	-	
Childish Gambino	"This Is America"	2	18 May	-	
Anne-Marie	"2002"	2	25 May	-	
Banx & Ranx and Ella Eyre featuring Yxng Bane	"Answerphone"	10	1 June	-	
Jess Glynne	"I'll Be There"	8	8 June	-	
Selena Gomez	"Back to You"	4	15 June	-	
Clean Bandit featuring Demi Lovato	"Solo"	1	22 June	1	
XXXTentacion	"Sad!"	8	29 June	-	
George Ezra	"Shotgun"	1	29 June	9	
5 Seconds of Summer	"Youngblood"	4	6 July	-	
Drake featuring Michael Jackson	"Don't Matter to Me" ◁	3	6 July	-	
Drake	"Nonstop" ◁	5	6 July	-	
Cardi B, Bad Bunny and J Balvin	"I Like It"	10	6 July	-	
Jonas Blue featuring Jack & Jack	"Rise"	3	13 July	-	
Years & Years	"If You're Over Me"	7	13 July	-	
Drake	"In My Feelings" ◁	2	20 July	-	
Ariana Grande	"God Is a Woman" ◁	4	20 July	-	
Tiësto and Dzeko featuring Preme and Post Malone	"Jackie Chan"	6	27 July	-	
Maroon 5 featuring Cardi B	"Girls Like You"	5	10 August	-	
DJ Khaled featuring Justin Bieber, Quavo and Chance the Rapper	"No Brainer" ◁	4	10 August	-	
Loud Luxury featuring Brando	"Body"	4	24 August	-	
Ariana Grande	"Breathin" ◁	5	24 August	-	
Benny Blanco, Halsey and Khalid	"Eastside"	1	31 August	1	
Dynoro and Gigi D'Agostino	"In My Mind"	5	31 August	-	
Calvin Harris and Sam Smith	"Promises" ◁	1	7 September	5	
Eminem	"The Ringer" ◁	6	7 September	-	
Eminem featuring Joyner Lucas	"Lucky You" ◁	7	7 September	-	
Hozier featuring Mavis Staples	"Nina Cried Power" ◁	10	14 September	-	
Kanye West and Lil Pump	"I Love It" ◁	2	21 September	-	
Lil Peep and XXXTentacion	"Falling Down" ◁	8	28 September	-	
Silk City and Dua Lipa	"Electricity" ◁	6	12 October	-	
LSD	"Thunderclouds"	8	12 October	-	
Lady Gaga and Bradley Cooper	"Shallow"	1	12 October	4	
Jess Glynne	"All I Am"	10	12 October	-	
Dean Lewis	"Be Alright"	4	19 October	-	
Marshmello and Bastille	"Happier"	2	26 October	-	
Rita Ora	"Let You Love Me"	4	26 October	-	
Lady Gaga	"Always Remember Us This Way"	3	26 October	-	
Khalid	"Better"	8	26 October	-	
Lady Gaga and Bradley Cooper	"I'll Never Love Again"	10	26 October	-	
XXXTentacion and Lil Pump featuring Maluma and Swae Lee	"Arms Around You" ◁	8	2 November	-	
Little Mix featuring Nicki Minaj	"Woman Like Me" ◁	3	9 November	-	
Ariana Grande	"Thank U, Next" ◁	1	9 November	6	
Billie Eilish	"When the Party's Over"	7	30 November	-	
Halsey	"Without Me"	3	7 December	-	
Zara Larsson	"Ruin My Life"	5	7 December	-	
Jess Glynne	"Thursday"	9	7 December	-	
Picture This	"Everything or Nothing" ◁	7	14 December	-	
Ava Max	"Sweet but Psycho"	1	21 December	5	
Ariana Grande	"Imagine" ◁	4	21 December	-	

== Entries by artist ==
The following table shows artists who achieved two or more top 10 entries in 2018. The figures include both main artists and featured artists and the peak position in brackets.

Entries	Artist	Songs
5	Drake	"God's Plan" (1), "Nice for What" (2), "Don't Matter to Me" (3), "Nonstop" (5), "In My Feelings" (2)
5	Ariana Grande	"No Tears Left to Cry" (1), "God Is a Woman" (4), "Breathin" (5), "Thank U, Next" (1), "Imagine" (4)
4	Post Malone	"Psycho" (2), "Better Now" (4), Paranoid" (7), "Jackie Chan" (6)
4	Jess Glynne	"These Days" (2), "I'll Be There" (8), "All I Am" (10), "Thursday" (9)
3	Dua Lipa	"IDGAF" (1), "One Kiss" (1), "Electricity" (6)
3	Cardi B	"Finesse" (5), "Girls Like You" (5), "I Like It" (10)
3	Khalid	"Love Lies" (8), "Eastside" (1), "Better" (8)
3	Lady Gaga	"Shallow" (1), "Always Remember Us This Way" (3), "I'll Never Love Again" (10)
3	XXXTentacion	"Sad!" (8), "Falling Down" (8), "Arms Around You" (8)
2	Eminem	"The Ringer" (6), "Lucky You" (7)
2	Marshmello	"Friends" (3), "Happier" (2)
2	Anne-Marie	"Friends" (3), "2002" (2)
2	Clean Bandit	"I Miss You" (3), "Solo" (1)
2	George Ezra	"Paradise" (5), "Shotgun" (1)
2	Calvin Harris	"One Kiss" (1), "Promises" (1)
2	Rita Ora	"Anywhere" (4), "Let You Love Me" (4)
2	Bradley Cooper	"Shallow" (1), "I'll Never Love Again" (10)
2	Lil Pump	"I Love It" (2), "Arms Around You" (8)
2	Halsey	"Eastside" (1), "Without Me" (3)
2	Picture This	"This Morning" (6), "Everything or Nothing" (7)

== See also ==
- 2018 in music
- List of number-one singles of 2018 (Ireland)
