= Tong Leadership Academy =

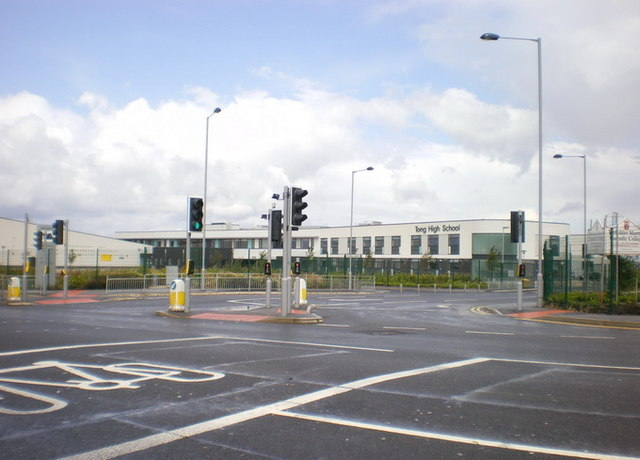

Location
- Westgate Hill Street; Tong; Bradford, West Yorkshire, BD4 6NR; England; 53°45′53″N 1°41′59″W

Information
- Type: Academy
- Established: 2008
- Local authority: Bradford City Council
- Trust: Star Academies
- Department for Education URN: 142761 Tables
- Ofsted: Reports
- Executive Principal: Munif Zia
- Gender: Co-educational
- Age: 11 to 19
- Enrolment: 925 as of September 2020
- Colours: Purple; Black; Green
- Website: http://www.tongleadershipacademy.com/

Tong Leadership Academy (formerly Tong High School) is a co-educational secondary school located in the Tong area of Bradford in West Yorkshire, England.

== History ==
In 2008 Tong High School went through a major remodelling. A new building was built and after vacating, the old building was demolished.

In December 2016, the school converted to academy status, joining Tauheedul Education Trust (now Star Academies), and was renamed Tong Leadership Academy.

== Sport teams ==
Boys' sport teams include those for football, rugby, cricket, swimming, trampolining, badminton and athletics (indoor and cross country). Girls' sport teams include those for football, netball, rounders, gymnastics, swimming, cheerleading, trampolining, and athletics (indoor and cross country), and yoga

== Notable former pupils ==
- Fabian Delph – football player at Manchester City F.C. formerly, Aston Villa, Leeds United and Bradford City
- Claire Hardaker – linguist
- Zayn Malik – former member of the boy-band One Direction and now a solo artist
- Melissa Steel – singer known for Kisses for Breakfast feat Popcaan, and I Loved You by Blonde which she featured on

== See also ==
- List of schools in Bradford
