= Kisses for Breakfast =

Kisses for Breakfast may refer to:

- Kisses for Breakfast (film), 1941
- "Kisses for Breakfast" (song), 2014
