= Embers (James Newman song) =

2021 song by James Newman

Single by James Newman
- Released: 11 March 2021
- Genre: Dance-pop
- Length: 2:55
- Label: BMG
- Songwriters: James Newman; Conor Blake; Danny Shah; Tom Hollings; Samuel Brennan

James Newman singles chronology
"Alone" (2020)	"Embers" (2021)

Music video
- "Embers" on YouTube

Eurovision Song Contest 2021 entry
- Country: United Kingdom
- Artist: James Newman
- Language: English
- Lyricists: James Newman; Conor Blake; Danny Shah; Tom Hollings; Samuel Brennan

Finals performance
- Final result: 26th (last)
- Final points: 0

Entry chronology
- ◄ "My Last Breath" (2020)
- "Space Man" (2022) ►

"Embers" is a song released by British singer James Newman, on 11 March 2021. It represented the United Kingdom in the Eurovision Song Contest 2021 in Rotterdam, where it came in last place with no points. Described as a dance pop single, the song is about enduring passion, which Newman felt had resonance with the approaching end point of the COVID-19 pandemic.

In an interview on BBC radio's Newsbeat, Newman stated: "I feel like everyone wants a party and to have some fun so when I was writing, that's what I had in my head. I wanted something people can dance to, even if it's just in their kitchen." The song received mixed reviews from critics. Following the contest it reached the top forty within Lithuania, Belgium and the United Kingdom and charted in Sweden and the Netherlands. It has since been certified Platinum in Denmark.

== Eurovision Song Contest ==
Newman was selected to represent the United Kingdom in the Eurovision Song Contest 2020 with the song "My Last Breath", before the event was cancelled due to the COVID-19 pandemic in Europe. On 19 February 2021, the British broadcaster BBC announced that Newman was again internally selected for the 2021 contest, that will be held in Rotterdam, Netherlands.

As a member of the Big Five, the United Kingdom automatically qualified for the final on 22 May 2021. The United Kingdom was the ninth country to perform, following Serbia and preceding Greece.

The song scored zero points ("nul points") from both the jury vote and the audience televote, becoming the first entry to do so since the jury vote and televotes were split in 2016. It is also the second UK entry to receive no points in the country's history at the competition.

== Reviews ==
The song received mixed reviews. Roisin O'Connor of The Independent gave the song three out of five stars. O'Connor stated that "Newman delivers these lyrics in charismatic whoops – he actually sounds like a children's entertainer – so you can forgive the clichés. And anyway, as he's probably noticed, Eurovision judges are fans of a few clichés. So nice one, James. It probably won't get the coveted douze points, but it will raise more smiles than our usual efforts."

Jochan Embley of the Evening Standard also rated the song three out of five stars overall, feeling that "This feel-good dance-pop bop should be more than enough to avoid any nil points catastrophe". Embley also stated that "It is a pretty by-the-numbers dance-pop track – with some faint steel dreams in the intro, plucky pianos and hand claps in the chorus, and fairly ambiguous lyrics about how 'you and I are gonna light up the room' – but it's most certainly the most fun this nation has had with its entry since the ever so slightly unhinged electro swing of 'Still in Love with You' from 2015."

== Charts ==
Chart performance for "Embers"
Chart (2021)	Peak position
Belgium (Ultratip Bubbling Under Flanders)	47
Lithuania (AGATA)	45
Netherlands (Single Top 100)	80
Sweden (Sverigetopplistan)	97
UK Singles (OCC)	47
UK Indie (OCC)	7

== Certifications ==
Region	Certification	Certified units/sales
Denmark (IFPI Danmark)	Platinum	90,000^{‡}
^{‡} Sales+streaming figures based on certification alone.
