= Youth (Tinie Tempah album) =

Studio album by Tinie Tempah
- Released: 14 April 2017
- Length: 59:14
- Labels: Parlophone; Disturbing London
- Producers: Nana Rogues; Bless Beats; Shift K3Y; MNEK; TroyBoi; Jax Jones; Grades; David Stewart; Legendury Beatz; Yogi; JRmix; Shockaddict; Richie Montana; Scotty LVX; Lovy Longomba

Tinie Tempah chronology
Demonstration (2013)	Youth (2017)	The Night's Not Dead (2026)

Singles from Youth
- 1. "Not Letting Go" Released: 19 June 2015; 2. "Turn the Music Louder (Rumble)" Released: 18 October 2015; 3. "Girls Like" Released: 26 February 2016; 4. "Mamacita" Released: 8 July 2016; 5. "Text from Your Ex" Released: 16 February 2017

Youth is the third studio album by British rapper Tinie Tempah, released on 14 April 2017 by Parlophone and Disturbing London.

== Singles ==
The first single from Youth, "Not Letting Go", featured vocals from Jess Glynne and was released in the United Kingdom on 19 June 2015, the single debuted at number one on the UK Singles Chart. In February, "Girls Like" featuring Zara Larsson was released as the second single. "Mamacita" featuring Wizkid was released on 8 July 2016 as the third single from the album. "Text from Your Ex" and "Chasing Flies" were released as the album's next singles on 20 January 2017. "Find Me" featuring Jake Bugg was released as a single on 7 April 2017. Despite issuing four top 40 singles, the album would exit the UK Albums Chart after three weeks.

Four more singles from Youth were released in 2018: "Cameras" featuring Jake Bugg on 17 January, "So Close" featuring Guy Sebastian and Bugzy Malone on 8 May, "They Don't Know" featuring Kid Ink, Stefflon Don and AoD on 18 September and "Not for the Radio" featuring MNEK on 19 December.

== Track listing ==
Youth track listing
No.	Title	Writer(s)	Producer(s)	Length
1.	"Youth"	Patrick Okogwu; Nana Rogues	Rogues	3:12
2.	"Not for the Radio" (featuring MNEK)	Okogwu; Uzoechi "Uzo" Emenike	MNEK	4:05
3.	"Lightwork"	Okogwu; Lewis Jankel	Shift K3Y	3:44
4.	"Chasing Flies" (featuring Nea)	Okogwu; Linnea Södahl; Troy Henry	TroyBoi	3:22
5.	"Mamacita" (featuring Wizkid)	Okogwu; Marlysse Rose Simmons; St. Aubyn Antonio Levy; Janee Bennett; Reinaldo Gonzalez Alvarez; Ayodeji Ibrahim Balogun	Bless Beats	3:39
6.	"Text from Your Ex" (featuring Tinashe)	Okogwu; Ina Wroldsen; Timucin Aluo; Daniel Traynor	Jax Jones; Grades^{[a]}	3:25
7.	"Cameras" (featuring David Stewart)	Okogwu; David Stewart	David Stewart	4:02
8.	"If You Know" (featuring Tiggs Da Author)	Okogwu; Adam Simon	Legendury Beatz	3:39
9.	"Holy Moly"	Okogwu; Jankel	Shift K3Y	2:41
10.	"Girls Like" (featuring Zara Larsson)	Okogwu; Zara Larsson; Aleisha Bennet; Nana Rogues; Bennett; Lewis Jankel; Markus Sepehrmanesh	Rogues	3:15
11.	"Something Special"	Okogwu	Rogues	2:08
12.	"They Don't Know" (featuring Kid Ink, Stefflon Don and AoD)	Okogwu; Alastair O'Donnell; Brian Todd Collins; Stephanie Allen	Yogi; JRmix; Shockaddict^{[b]}; Richie Montana^{[b]}	3:36
13.	"So Close" (featuring Guy Sebastian and Bugzy Malone)	Okogwu; Guy Theodore Sebastian; Aaron Davis	Rogues	4:17
14.	"Find Me" (featuring Jake Bugg)	Okogwu; O'Donnell; Nana Rogues; Jake Bugg; Dominic McAllister	Rogues	4:23
15.	"Rehab" (featuring Tiggs Da Author)	Okogwu; Simon	Rogues	3:02
16.	"Shadows" (featuring Bipolar Sunshine)	Okogwu; Parham Terrel; Adio Marchant; Lovy Longomba; Racella De Guia	Scotty LVX; Lovy	2:58
17.	"Not Letting Go" (featuring Jess Glynne)	Okogwu; Jessica Glynne; Jermaine Jackson; Gareth Keane; Bennett; Krishane Murray; Jankel	Bless Beats; Shift K3Y^{[b]}	3:49
Total length:				59:14

Notes

- Credits are adapted from the album's liner notes.
- ^[a] – co-producer
- ^[b] – additional production

== Charts ==
Chart (2017)	Peak position
Belgian Albums (Ultratop Flanders)	103
Irish Albums (IRMA)	76
New Zealand Heatseekers Albums (RMNZ)	5
Scottish Albums (Official Charts)	27
Swiss Albums (Schweizer Hitparade)	99
UK Albums (Official Charts)	9
UK R&B Albums (Official Charts)	2

== Certifications ==
Region	Certification	Certified units/sales
New Zealand (RMNZ)	Gold	7,500^{‡}
United Kingdom (BPI)	Gold	100,000^{‡}
^{‡} Sales+streaming figures based on certification alone.

== Release history ==
Region	Date	Format	Label
Ireland	14 April 2017	CD; digital download	Parlophone; Disturbing London
United Kingdom	14 April 2017	CD; digital download	Parlophone; Disturbing London
