= Kove =

- Born: James Rockhill; 20 May 1990 (age 36)
- Origin: Sussex, England
- Genres: Drum and bass; house
- Occupations: Record producer; remixer
- Years active: 2010–present
- Labels: Drum & Bass Arena (2017–present); KVRT Records (2016); MTA Records (2013–2016); Program (2012–13); Viper (2012)

James Rockhill (born 20 May 1990), better known by his stage name Kove, is a British electronic music producer and DJ. His song "Way We Are", featuring Melissa Steel, entered the UK Singles Chart at number 30.

== Career ==
=== 2012–13: Early beginnings ===
Rockhill signed his debut double A-side single "Stellar" / "Breach" to Viper Recordings in 2012. It was released on 5 March 2012. His second single, "Iodine" / "Open Ground" was released on Andy C's Program on 8 October 2012. Rockhill released "Gone" / "Airlock" through Program in early 2013. Later in the year, he signed to Chase & Status's label MTA Records, remixing their comeback single "Lost & Not Found" and releasing his debut EP Measures through the label. The EP's first track, "Love for You", received heavy airplay on BBC Radio 1Xtra and marked the start of his commercial breakthrough.

=== 2014–present: Breakthrough ===
Following remixes for Bastille and John Newman, he released the double A-side "Gobble" / "Melisma" through MTA on 16 February 2014. His first charting single, "Way We Are", was released in July 2014 and entered the UK Singles Chart at number 30. His next EP, Murmurations, was released on 5 October 2014 and includes the song "Drop" (premiered by Annie Mac).

== Discography ==
=== Extended plays ===
Title	Details	Track listing
Measures	Released: 18 October 2013; Label: MTA Records; Formats: Digital download, vinyl	"Love for You"; "Searching"; "Night Thought"; "Lose You"
Way We Are	Released: 13 July 2014; Label: MTA Records; Formats: Digital download	"Way We Are (Extended Mix)"; "Way We Are (Dub Mix)"; "Way We Are (174 Mix)"; "Liberator"
Murmurations	Released: 5 October 2014; Label: MTA Records; Formats: Digital download	"Drop"; "Feel Love Again" (with Dimension); "VCO"; "Still High"
Nightfires, Vol. 1	Released: 8 April 2016; Label: KVRT Records; Formats: Digital download	"El Camino"; "Comin' On Strong" (featuring Kideko); "The Silence"; "Altus"
Nightfires, Vol. 2	Released: 19 September 2016; Label: KVRT Records; Formats: Digital download	"Bring Me Life" (featuring Jonny Fears); "Into The Fire" (featuring Folly Rae); "Jericho"; "L.Y.L."
In From The Cold	Released: 24 November 2017; Label: Drum&BassArena; Formats: Digital download	"Ain't No Love"; "Dig It"; "Give 'Em Hell"; "Valkyrie"

=== Singles ===
Year	Title	Peak chart positions			Album
Year	Title	UK	UK Dance	SCO	Album
2012	"Stellar" / "Breach"	–	—	—	—N/a
2012	"Iodine" / "Open Ground"	–	—	—	—N/a
2013	"Gone" / "Airlock"	–	—	—	—N/a
2013	"Searching"	–	—	—	Measures
2013	"Night Thought"	–	—	—	Measures
2014	"Gobble" / "Melisma"	–	—	—	—N/a
2014	"Way We Are" (featuring Melissa Steel)	30	7	38	—N/a
2015	"Hurts" (featuring Moko)	–	—	—	—N/a
2017	"All or Nothing" (with Joseph J. Jones)	–	—	—	—N/a
2017	"Ain't No Love"	–	—	—	In From The Cold
2018	"Give & Take"	–	—	—	—N/a
2018	"Tonight"	–	—	—	—N/a
2019	"Echoes" (featuring Ben Duffy)	–	—	—	—N/a
2019	"Bearclaw"	–	—	—	Drum&BassArena 2019
2019	"Motor"	–	—	—	—N/a
2019	"Le Retour"	–	—	—	UKF10 - Ten Years of UKF
2019	"The Music"	–	—	—	—N/a
2020	"Burn" (with Brookes Brothers featuring Kathy Brown)	–	—	—	—N/a
2020	"Power"	–	—	—	—N/a
2020	"Healing" (featuring Charlotte Haining)	–	—	—	—N/a
2021	"Sweet Music"	–	—	—	25 Years of Drum&BassArena
2022	"Placebo" (with Jack Mirror)	–	—	—	—N/a
2023	"So Much Love"	–	—	—	—N/a
"—" denotes a single that did not chart or was not released.

=== Other appearances ===
Year	Song	Release	Label
2012	"Sleep It Off"	Summer Slammers 2012	Viper
2014	"Searching VIP"	MTA5	MTA
2014	"Night Thought VIP"	MTA5	MTA
2016	"Dust"	Drum&BassArena 2016	Drum&BassArena

=== Remixes ===
Year	Song	Artist
2012	"Betamax"	Big Black Delta
2012	"End of the World"	Deap Vally
2013	"Love Me Again"	John Newman
2013	"Lost & Not Found"	Chase & Status (featuring Louis M^ttrs)
2013	"Of the Night"	Bastille
2014	"Holding Onto Heaven"	Foxes
2014	"10 Million People"	Example
2014	"1 Bad Bitch"	Ten Ven & Ripley vs. Zebra Katz
2014	"Lost You"	Zeds Dead (featuring Twin Shadow & D'Angelo Lacy)
2015	"Together"	Ella Eyre
2015	"Pony (Jump on It)"	Tough Love (featuring Ginuwine)
2015	"Are We Electric?"	The Kooks
2015	"Never Forget You"	MNEK and Zara Larsson
2016	"Say You Do"	Sigala (featuring Imani Williams and DJ Fresh)
2016	"Nothing Like This"	Blonde (featuring Craig David)
2016	"Say To Me"	WHTKD
2017	"Highs & Lows"	Emeli Sandé
2017	"Skin"	Rag'n'Bone Man
2017	"More & More"	Tom Zanetti (featuring Karen Harding)
2018	"Wild Love"	James Bay
2018	"Stargazer"	End of the World
2018	"Start Over"	Ellis & Laura Brehm
2019	"Wires"	Kovic
2020	"Grow"	BCee, Blu Mar Ten & Charlotte Haining
2021	"Nothing For Free"	Pendulum
2021	"Be There"	T & Sugah (featuring Ayah Marar)
2021	"Sublimate"	Waterstrider
2022	"Sweater Weather"	Jomarijam & The Neighbourhood
2023	"Mirrors"	Emba
2023	"Could You Be the One"	Laidback Luke & Katy Alex
2023	"Everytime"	Maduk (featuring Calixte)
2023	"Overcome"	Nothing but Thieves
2023	"True Love (Make Me Believe)"	WILDES (featuring The Flaming Lips)
