= Touch (Shift K3Y song) =

Single by Shift K3Y
- Released: 13 April 2014
- Recorded: 2011–13
- Genre: UK garage
- Length: 3:00
- Label: Sony
- Songwriter: Lewis Shay Jankel
- Producer: Shift K3Y

Shift K3Y singles chronology
"Laughing at You" (2013)	"Touch" (2014)	"I Know" (2014)

"Touch" is a song by the British record producer and DJ Shift K3Y. The song was released in the United Kingdom on 13 April 2014 as a digital download. The song peaked at number 3 on the UK Singles Chart. It was written and produced by Shift K3Y.

A remix produced by Grum was featured in Forza Horizon 2

== Music video ==
A music video to accompany the release of "Touch" was first released onto YouTube on 3 March 2014 at a total length of two minutes and fifty-nine seconds.

== Track listing ==
Digital download
No.	Title	Length
1.	"Touch" (Radio Edit)	3:00
2.	"Make It Good"	5:00
3.	"Touch" (Chris Lorenzo Remix)	7:03
4.	"Touch" (Oxford Remix)	3:43
5.	"Touch" (Three Bar Remix)	5:06

== Chart performance ==
On 16 April 2014, the song was at number 3 on The Official Chart Update in the UK. On 20 April 2014, the song entered the UK Singles Chart at number three, making it his first UK top 5 single.

== Charts and certifications ==
=== Charts ===
Chart (2014)	Peak position
Belgium (Ultratip Bubbling Under Flanders)	51
Scottish Singles Sales (Official Charts)	6
UK Dance (Official Charts)	3
UK Singles (Official Charts)	3

=== Certifications ===
Region	Certification	Certified units/sales
United Kingdom (BPI)	Gold	400,000^{‡}
^{‡} Sales+streaming figures based on certification alone.

== Release history ==
Region	Date	Format	Label
United Kingdom	13 April 2014	Digital download	Sony
United States	1 July 2014	Dance radio	Columbia
