= Always In Between =

Studio album by Jess Glynne
- Released: 12 October 2018
- Genre: Pop; dance-pop; R&B
- Length: 40:52
- Label: Atlantic
- Producer: Starsmith; Toby Gad; Louis Bell; Mark Ralph; Julian Bunetta; Knox Brown; Electric; Steve Mac; Jonny Coffer; Bastian Langebaek; Fred Gibson; Cass Lowe; Rudimental; John Ryan; Too Many Zooz; KDA; Jae5

Jess Glynne chronology
I Cry When I Laugh (2015)	Always In Between (2018)	Jess (2024)

Singles from Always in Between
- 1. "I'll Be There" Released: 4 May 2018; 2. "All I Am" Released: 17 August 2018; 3. "Thursday" Released: 11 October 2018

Always In Between is the second studio album by British singer Jess Glynne, released on 12 October 2018 by Atlantic Records. It debuted at number one on the UK Albums Chart and in the top forty of several other countries. It was Glynne's last album with Atlantic.

== Background and music ==
Glynne announced Always In Between was to be released on 29 June 2018, along with a world tour of the same name. The album was supported by the UK number-one single "I'll Be There". A pop, dance-pop, and R&B album, it marks Glynne's first studio release in three years since her debut project, I Cry When I Laugh (2015), and the last album from Atlantic Records.

== Critical reception ==
Professional ratings
Aggregate scores
Source	Rating
Metacritic	60/100
Review scores
Source	Rating
AllMusic	3/5 stars
The Guardian	2/5 stars
Rolling Stone	3.5/5 stars
The Times	2/5 stars

Always In Between received mixed reviews from music critics. At Metacritic, which assigns a normalised rating out of 100 to reviews from mainstream critics, the album has an average score of 60 out of 100 based on 4 reviews, indicating "mixed or average reviews".

Alexis Petridis of The Guardian gave the album two stars out of five, calling it "generic Top 40 and soul-pop finished to a high standard". While noting that the album is "influenced by classic soul, heavy on the blaring brass – not so much Amy Winehouse as her less emotionally wrenching contemporary Joss Stone – and, at the other, undemanding dance-pop topped by an immediately recognisable voice, the same idea that garnered M People vast success 20 years ago", Petridis concluded that "[y]ou can see why people relate to it, you can tell it's going to be huge: it is what pop is in 2018, but the feeling that pop can be something rather more than this is hard to shake." Will Hodgkinson of The Times gave the album the same rating, comparing tracks "No One" and "Broken" and their "teary verses and swelling choruses" to Adele but said the tracks "lack Adele's ability to evoke real feeling". He ultimately called the album "missing any real sense of character or expression." In a more positive review, Maura Johnston, writing for Rolling Stone, said "she’s once again bridging the gap between bouncy pop-EDM and feisty soul, shaking off the malaise that’s struck too many of her playlisted peers in a way that lets Glynne serve as a one-woman rooting crew for herself and, by extension, anyone in need of a peppy pick-me-up" and gave the album three and a half stars.

== Commercial performance ==
In the United Kingdom, Always In Between debuted at number one on the UK Albums Chart, selling 36,500 album-equivalent units during its first week of release, with a total of 24,820 physical sales (67% of overall units). In doing so, she scored her second UK number-one album, while also becoming the first British female artist to achieve a number-one album in the country in 2018.

== Track listing ==
Standard edition
No.	Title	Writer(s)	Producer(s)	Length
1.	"Intro"	Jessica Glynne; Andrew "Knox" Brown	Knox Brown	1:38
2.	"No One"	Glynne; Janée Bennett; Tobias Gad	Toby Gad; Louis Bell^{[b]}	3:39
3.	"I'll Be There"	Glynne; Jerker Hansson; Finlay Dow-Smith; Henrik Michelsen; Edvard Erfjord; Camille Purcell	Starsmith; Electric; Bell^{[a]}	3:14
4.	"Thursday"	Glynne; Edward Sheeran; Steve McCutcheon	Steve Mac	3:36
5.	"All I Am"	Glynne; Bennett; James Newman; Sophie Cooke; Bastian Langebaek; Sandy Rivera; Jay "Sinister" Sealee	Mark Ralph	3:39
6.	"123"	Glynne; Bennett; Jordan Thomas; Newman; Jonathan Mensah	Jae5; Glynne	3:10
7.	"Never Let Me Go"	Glynne; Jamie Scott; Julian Bunetta; John Ryan II	Bunetta	3:28
8.	"Broken"	Glynne; Scott; Jonathan Coffer	Coffer	3:37
9.	"Hate/Love"	Glynne; Bennett; Langebaek	Langebaek	4:28
10.	"Won't Say No"	Glynne; Bennett; Dow-Smith; Clarence Coffee Jr.	Starsmith	3:05
11.	"Rollin"	Glynne; Bennett; Frederick Gibson	Fred; Starsmith	3:38
12.	"Nevermind"	Glynne; Bennett; Cass Lowe	Lowe	3:42
Total length:				40:52

Japanese edition
No.	Title	Writer(s)	Producer(s)	Length
13.	"I'll Be There" (acoustic)	Glynne; Hansson; Dow-Smith; Michelsen; Erfjord; Purcell	Starsmith; Electric; Bell^{[a]}
14.	"All I Am" (CliQ Remix)	Glynne; Bennett; Newman; Cooke; Langebaek; Rivera; Sealee	Ralph; CliQ

Deluxe edition
No.	Title	Writer(s)	Producer(s)	Length
13.	"These Days" (Rudimental featuring Jess Glynne, Macklemore and Dan Caplen)	Amir Amor; Kesi Dryden; Piers Aggett; Leon "DJ Locksmith" Rolle; Daniel Caplen; Scott; Bunetta; Ryan II; Ben Haggerty	Rudimental; Bunetta; Ryan; Ralph	3:31
14.	"So Real (Warriors)" (Too Many Zooz vs. KDA featuring Jess Glynne)	Leo Pellegrino; Bennett; Monsters & Strangerz; Glynne; David Parks; Ivan Rosenberg; Kris Di Angelis; Matthew Muirhead	Too Many Zooz; KDA	2:51
15.	"Million Reasons"	Glynne; Dow-Smith; Sara Hjellstrom; Nirob Islam	Starsmith	3:21
16.	"Insecurities"	Glynne; Bennett; Gad	Gad	3:17
Total length:				53:52

Streaming deluxe edition
No.	Title	Writer(s)	Producer(s)	Length
17.	"One Touch" (with Jax Jones)	Janee Bennett; Jax Jones; Glynne	Jones; Mark Ralph	3:17
Total length:				57:09

== Personnel ==
Credits were adpated from AllMusic.

- Jess Glynne – Composer, Primary Artist, Vocals
- The Amours – Vocals (Background)
- Amy Stewart – Contractor
- Andrew Knox Brown – Composer, Drums, Keyboards, Sampling, Producer
- Angel Williams – Vocals (Background)
- Anthony Lewis – Percussion
- Bastian Langebæk – Composer, Drum Programming, Engineer, Guitar, Organ, Piano, Producer, Programmer, Synthesizer
- Beau Blaise – Engineer
- Camille Purcell – Composer
- Cass Lowe – Composer
- Cathy Thompson – Violin
- Chris Elliot – Arranger
- Chris Laws – Drums, Engineer
- Chris Worsey – Cello
- Clarence Coffee Jr. – Composer
- Daniel Pursey – Engineer
- Danny T – Engineer
- Dave Daniels – Cello
- David Emery – Mixing
- Deborah Widdup – Violin
- Ed Sheeran – Composer, Guitar
- Edvard Førre Erfjord – Composer
- The Electric – Producer, Synthesizer
- Emlyn Singleton – Violin
- Everton Nelson – Strings, Violin
- Fin Dow-Smith – Composer
- Fred Gibson – Composer, Engineer, Producer
- Greg Hofmann – Bass
- Helen Kamminga – Viola
- Henrik Michelsen – Composer
- Holly Petrie – Vocals (Background)
- Ian Burdge – Cello
- Jack DeBoe – Engineer
- James Newman – Composer
- Jamie Scott – Composer
- Janee Bennett – Composer
- Jason Sealee – Composer
- Jeff Gunnell – Engineer
- Jenny Sacha – Violin
- Jerker Hansson – Composer
- Jesse Appiah – Vocals (Background)
- Jimmy Douglass – Mixing
- John Hanes – Engineer
- John Mills – Violin
- John Paricelli – Guitar
- John Ryan – Composer, Guitar
- Jonny Coffer – Bass, Composer, Drums, Guitar, Piano, Producer, Programmer
- Julian Bunetta – Bass, Composer, Drums, Keyboards, Producer, Programmer
- Kate Musker – Viola
- Kate Robinson – Violin
- Kenji Fenton – Saxophone
- Kill Dave – Programmer, Programming
- Liam Nolan – Engineer
- Louis Bell – Drums, Producer, Synthesizer
- Magnus Johnston – Violin
- Marianne Haynes – Violin
- Mark "Spike" Stent – Mixing
- Mark Ralph – Mixing, Percussion, Piano, Producer, Synthesizer
- Martin Hannah – Engineer
- Martin Humbey – Viola
- Michael Freeman – Mixing
- Mike Davis – Flugelhorn
- Mike Horner – Engineer
- Natalia Bonner – Violin
- Nick Cooper – Cello
- Nick Taylor – Engineer
- Patrick Kiernan – Violin
- Paul Burton – Trombone
- Perry Montague-Mason – Violin
- Peter Lale – Viola
- Richard George – Violin
- Rita Manning – Violin
- Ross Fortune – Assistant; Engineer
- Sandy Rivera – Composer
- Serban Ghenea – Mixing
- Sophie Cooke – Composer
- Starsmith – Bass, Drums, Guitar, Percussion, Piano, Producer, Synthesizer
- Steve Mac – Composer, Keyboards, Producer
- Stuart Hawkes – Mastering
- Teniola Abosede – Vocals (Background)
- Toby Gad – Bass, Composer, Engineer, Guitar, Piano, Producer, Programmer
- Tom Fuller – Assistant, Engineer
- Yebba – Vocal Arrangement, Vocals (Background)

== Charts ==
=== Weekly charts ===
Weekly chart performance
Chart (2018)	Peak position
Australian Albums (ARIA)	18
Austrian Albums (Ö3 Austria)	58
Belgian Albums (Ultratop Flanders)	34
Belgian Albums (Ultratop Wallonia)	182
Canadian Albums (Billboard)	51
Czech Albums (ČNS IFPI)	59
Dutch Albums (Album Top 100)	40
French Albums (SNEP)	141
German Albums (Offizielle Top 100)	33
Hungarian Albums (MAHASZ)	10
Irish Albums (OCC)	4
Italian Albums (FIMI)	31
Japanese Albums (Oricon)	139
New Zealand Albums (RMNZ)	16
Scottish Albums (OCC)	1
Slovak Albums (ČNS IFPI)	80
Spanish Albums (Promusicae)	40
Swiss Albums (Schweizer Hitparade)	32
UK Albums (OCC)	1
US Billboard 200	109

=== Year-end charts ===
Year-end chart performance
Chart	Year	Position
UK Albums (OCC)	2018	14
Irish Albums (IRMA)	2019	27
UK Albums (OCC)	2019	16
UK Albums (OCC)	2020	81

== Certifications ==
Certifications and sales
Region	Certification	Certified units/sales
Canada (Music Canada)	Gold	40,000^{‡}
New Zealand (RMNZ)	Platinum	15,000^{‡}
United Kingdom (BPI)	2× Platinum	600,000^{‡}
^{‡} Sales+streaming figures based on certification alone.
