= Shift K3y =

British musician (born 1993)

Shift K3Y
- Born: Lewis Shay Jankel; 27 May 1993 (age 33)
- Origin: London, England
- Genres: UK garage; deep house; trap; future house; tech house; electro house; progressive house
- Occupations: DJ; record producer; songwriter
- Instruments: Keyboards
- Years active: 2011–present
- Labels: Columbia; Sony; THRU THE NIT3

Lewis Shay Jankel (born 27 May 1993), better known by his stage name Shift K3Y (pronounced "shift key"), is a British DJ, record producer and songwriter, from London. He is best known for his 2014 singles "Touch", which peaked at No. 3 on the UK singles chart, and "I Know".

== Career ==
=== 2011–2012: Early career and record deals ===
Jankel released his debut EP Step in the City on 12 December 2011, through Marco Del Horno's record label Bullet Train. "Manage Ya", one of the EP tracks, was supported by BBC Radio 1 and 1Xtra DJs including MistaJam and Toddla T. On 23 July 2012, he released his second EP Left and Right with the label. Throughout the year, he released many remixes and bootlegs. Towards the end of 2012, he gained the attention of Borgore's record label Buygore and his song "Wiggle With It" featured exclusively on the label's Buygore Allstars Vol. 1 compilation. He released his third EP Let You Down through Buygore, and the track "Geeky Playtime" gained exposure through being uploaded to UKF.

=== 2013–present: Breakthrough ===
In 2013, Jankel changed his stage name from Shift Key to Shift K3Y. In March 2013, he released his fourth EP Frozen, through Buygore. He remixed Tinie Tempah's song "Trampoline", which was premiered by SB.TV (as the first of their SB.TV Beats features) and topped the Beatport hip hop charts. He also remixed AlunaGeorge's "Attracting Flies", and the remix was heavily supported by 1Xtra. Throughout 2013, he released three free singles: "Keep Ya Mouth Shut (Things People Say)" featuring Griminal; "Make It Good"; and "Laughing At You" which features vocals by Ruby Francis. On 13 April 2014, he released his breakthrough single "Touch". On 16 April 2014, the song was at number 3 on The Official Chart Update in the UK. On 20 April 2014, the song managed to maintain its position and entered the UK Singles Chart at number 3, making it his first UK top 5 single. The follow-up single, "I Know", was released on 21 September 2014. It reached number 25 on the UK Singles Chart. A non-single, titled "Not Into It (LA Mix)", samples vocals from "Long Way 2 Go" by Cassie and premiered on Annie Mac's Radio 1 show on 10 October 2014. Jankel's third mainstream single, "Name & Number", was released on 3 May 2015.

== Personal life ==
Shift K3Y is the son of Chaz Jankel, a British singer, songwriter, composer and record producer, and his wife Elaine O'Halloran. His aunt is director Annabel Jankel.

== Discography ==
=== Studio albums ===
List of studio albums
Title	Album details
Nit3 Tales	Released: 2017; Label: Sony; Format: digital download

=== Extended plays ===
Title	Details
Step in the City	Released: 12 December 2011; Label: Bullet Train; Format: Digital download
Left and Right	Released: 23 July 2012; Label: Bullet Train; Format: Digital download
The Musicool (with Marcus Clarke)	Released: 2012; Format: Free digital download
Let You Down	Released: 19 November 2012; Label: Buygore; Format: Digital download
Frozen	Released: 25 March 2013; Label: Buygore; Format: Digital download
Off the Record	Released: 27 August 2015; Label: Sony; Format: Digital download

=== Singles ===
==== As lead artist ====
Single	Year	Peak chart positions			Certification	Album
Single	Year	UK	UK Dance	SCO	Certification	Album
"Touch"	2014	3	3	6	BPI: Gold	Non-album singles
"I Know"	2014	25	6	23	BPI: Silver	Non-album singles
"Name & Number"	2015	—	—	—		Non-album singles
"Gone Missing" (featuring BB Diamond)	2015	96	—	—		Non-album singles
"Only You"	2018	—	—	—		Non-album singles
"Entirety" (featuring A*M*E)	2018	—	—	—		Non-album singles
"Rhythm of the Drum"	2019	—	—	—		Non-album singles
"To the Floor"	2019	—	—	—		Non-album singles
"Get Low"	2019	—	—	—		Non-album singles
"Push Ya Back Out"	2019	—	—	—		Non-album singles
"They Wanna Know"	2020	—	—	—		Non-album singles
"Do Me No Good"	2020	—	—	—		Non-album singles
"Love Line" (with Tinashe)	2021	—	—	—		Non-album singles
"Love Me Better" (with Dillon Francis featuring Marc E. Bassy)	2021	—	—	—		Happy Machine
"—" denotes a single that did not chart or was not released.

==== As featured artist ====
Single	Year	Peak chart positions		Album
Single	Year	UK	SCO	Album
"Better Off Without You" (Becky Hill featuring Shift K3Y)	2020	14	6	Only Honest on the Weekend

=== Promotional singles ===
Single	Year	Album
"Keep Ya Mouth Shut (Things People Say)" (featuring Griminal)	2013	Non-album singles
"Make It Good"	2013	Non-album singles
"Laughing at You" (featuring Ruby Francis)	2013	Non-album singles
"Not Into It"	2014	Non-album singles
"Crazy" (featuring Linden Jay)	2015	Non-album singles
"Laughing At You" (featuring Ruby Francis)	2015	Non-album singles
"Like This"	2016	Non-album singles
"The Underground"	2016	Non-album singles

=== Songwriting and production credits ===
Single	Year	Artist(s)	Album	Credit(s)
"La Plage" (featuring Bipolar Sunshine)	2013	Murkage	Of Mystics & Misfits	Producer
"Stranger"	2014	Leo Kalyan	Non-album single	Co-writer/Producer
"Not Letting Go" (featuring Jess Glynne)	2015	Tinie Tempah	Youth	Co-writer/Additional producer
"Daily Duppy Pt. I"	2015	Stormzy	Daily Duppy: Best of Season 4	Producer
"Keeping You Up"	2015	KStewart	Non-album single	Producer
"MOVE"	2016	Ruby Francis	Non-album single	Producer
"Girls Like" (featuring Zara Larsson)	2016	Tinie Tempah	Youth	Co-writer
"Bounce"	2016	Tinie Tempah	Non-album single	Co-writer/Producer
"Warm"	2016	Becky Hill	Eko EP	Co-writer/Producer
"Lightwork"	2017	Tinie Tempah	Youth	Co-writer/Producer
"Holy Moly"	2017	Tinie Tempah	Youth	Co-writer/Producer
"Memory Lane" (featuring Tom Grennan)	2017	Bugzy Malone	King of the North EP	Producer
"Man or a Monster"	2018	BB Diamond	Non-album single	Producer
"Distraction"	2018	Kate Stewart	In the Beginning EP	Co-writer/Producer
"Get Mine"	2019	Kate Stewart	Non-album single	Co-writer/Producer
"Breakdown"	2019	Becky Hill	Get to Know	Co-writer
"Make Me Go"	2020	Twice	More & More (EP)	Composer, arranger
"Candy"	2021	Twice	Formula of Love: O+T=＜3	Writer, composer, arranger
"No Problem" (featuring Felix of Stray Kids)	2022	Nayeon	Im Nayeon	Writer, composer, arranger
"Priority"	2022	Max Changmin, Taeyeon & Winter	2022 Winter SM Town: SMCU Palace	Composer/Producer
"I'll See You There Tomorrow"	2024	Tomorrow X Together	Minisode 3: Tomorrow	Composer, arranger, producer
"Enemies"	2024	Gryffin, bludnymph and Shift K3Y	Pulse	
"Insomnia"	2024	Zerobaseone	Cinema Paradise	Composer, arranger
"Steady"	2024	NCT Wish	Steady	Composer, arranger
"Eyes on You"	2024	Seventeen	Spill the Feels	Composer, arranger
"Whiplash"	2024	Aespa	Whiplash	Composer, arranger
"When I'm With You"	2024	NCT Dream	Dreamscape	Composer, arranger
"Move Like That" (Momo solo)	2025	Twice	Ten: The Story Goes On	Composer, arranger
"Super Icy" (Leeseo solo)	2026	Ive	Revive+	Composer, arranger
"너의 모든 가능성이 되어 줄게 (All the Possibilities)"	2026	TWS	No Tragedy	Composer, arranger
"널 따라가 (You, You)"	2026	TWS	No Tragedy	Composer, arranger
"Storm"	2026	Taeyong	WYLD	Composer, arranger
"Tokyo"	2026	Bebe Rexha	Dirty Blonde	Writer, producer
"Lemonade"	2026	Aespa	Lemonade	Composer, arranger

=== Remixes ===
Single	Year	Artist
"Airwave Hustler"	2012	Mercedes
"Boa" (with Linden Jay)	2012	Marcus James
"Get Right" (Bootleg)	2013	Jennifer Lopez
"Attracting Flies"	2013	AlunaGeorge
"Trampoline"	2013	Tinie Tempah (featuring 2 Chainz)
"Change Your Life"	2013	Iggy Azalea
"Touch"	2014	Shift K3Y
"Wrote a Song About You"	2014	MNEK
"Get Low"	2014	Dillon Francis and DJ Snake
"Change"	2014	Mapei
"I Know"	2014	Shift K3Y
"You & I (Forever)"	2014	Jessie Ware
"Talking Body"	2015	Tove Lo
"Flicka Da Wrist" (Shift K3Y VIP)	2015	Chedda Da Connect
"Let You Have Me" (Shift K3Y VIP)	2015	Shift K3Y
"No Scrubs" (Shift K3Y VIP)	2015	TLC
"Own Life"	2016	Vindata (featuring Anderson .Paak)
"Luv U Giv"	2016	Tommy Trash
"Jumanji"	2018	B Young
"Just Fine"	2018	Not3s
"Better Off Without You" (Shift K3Y VIP)	2020	Becky Hill and Shift K3Y 'Rita Ora - You Only Love Me - Shift K3Y Remix - 2023
