= Whiplash (EP) =

- Digital cover

EP by Aespa
- Released: October 21, 2024
- Length: 18:07
- Language: Korean
- Labels: SM; Kakao

Aespa chronology
Synk: Parallel Line (2024)	Whiplash (2024)	Dirty Work (2025)

Singles from Whiplash
- 1. "Whiplash" Released: October 21, 2024

Whiplash is the fifth extended play by South Korean girl group Aespa. It was released by SM Entertainment on October 21, 2024, and contains six tracks, including the lead single of the same name.

== Background and release ==
On September 23, 2024, SM Entertainment announced that Aespa would be releasing their fifth extended play titled Whiplash with the lead single of the same name on October 21. Three days later, the promotional schedule was released. On October 11, the track listing was released alongside the highlight medley teaser video. Nine days later, the music video teaser for "Whiplash" was released. The extended play was released alongside the music video for "Whiplash" on October 21.

== Composition ==
Whiplash contains six tracks. The lead single, "Whiplash", was described as a EDM-based song featuring "strong and fast-paced bass and house beats" with lyrics about "moving forward without hesitation with your own standards and criteria without being confined by a frame". The second track, "Kill It", was described as a hip-hop dance song characterized by "catchy synth" with lyrics "expressesing a warning message to those who send unreasonable criticism". The third track, "Flights, Not Feelings", was described as a R&B song featuring "a vintage yet mysterious rhythm" with lyrics "about having fun [while] letting go of bad feelings and living freely".

The fourth track, "Pink Hoodie", was described as a hip-hop dance song featuring "unique synth sound and energetic bassline" with lyrics "wittily expressing the message of loving yourself as you are and having confidence". The fifth track, "Flowers", was described as an alternative R&B song featuring "sophisticated guitar riff" with lyrics "comparing the feelings of falling in love to flowers". The last track, "Just Another Girl", was described as a pop rock song characterized by "a rough guitar sound" with lyrics "conveying a warning message to a betrayed lover with a feeling of relief".

== Commercial performance ==
In United Kingdom, Whiplash debuted at number 53 on the OCC's UK Album Downloads Chart.

== Promotion ==
Prior to the release of Whiplash, on October 21, 2024, Aespa held a live event on YouTube, TikTok, and Weverse, aimed at introducing the extended play and connecting with their fanbase. Additionally, a pop-up store named "Aespa Week – #Whiplash_mood" was opened in Seoul, South Korea, running from October 21 to November 3.

== Accolades ==
Awards and nominations for Whiplash
Award ceremony	Year	Category	Result	Ref.
MAMA Awards	2025	Album of the Year	Nominated	
TMElive International Music Awards	2025	International Digital EP of the Year	Won	

== Track listing ==
Whiplash track listing
No.	Title	Lyrics	Music	Arrangement	Length
1.	"Whiplash"	Leslie (XYXX)	Marcus "MarcLo" Lomax; Neil Ormandy; Rosina "Soaky Siren" Russell; Lewis Jankel	Lewis Jankel; Neil Ormandy	3:03
2.	"Kill It"	Hyun Ji-won	Imlay; Ejae; Kirsten Collins	Imlay	3:20
3.	"Flights, Not Feelings"	Lee Hye-yum (Jam Factory)	Honey Noise (The Hub); Brown Panda (The Hub); Frankie Day (The Hub); Chanti (The Hub)	Honey Noise (The Hub); Brown Panda (The Hub)	3:02
4.	"Pink Hoodie"	Lee Eun-hwa (153/Joombas)	Didrik Thott; Sebastian Thott; Maria Marcus	Sebastian Thott	2:27
5.	"Flowers"	Ji Ye-won (153/Joombas)	Sofia Kay; Chantry Johnson; Noémie Legrand	Chantry Johnson	3:11
6.	"Just Another Girl"	Lee Seu-ran	Fabian Torsson; Moa "Cazzi Opeia" Carlebecker; Ellen Berg; Nermin Harambasic	Phat Fabe	3:04
Total length:					18:07

== Credits and personnel ==
Credits adapted from the EP's liner notes.

Studio

- SM Dorii Studio – recording (track 1–3, 5), digital editing (track 5)
- SM Yellow Tail Studio – recording (track 1, 3), digital editing, engineered for mix (track 1)
- SM Droplet Studio – recording (track 1–2, 4), digital editing, engineered for mix (track 2)
- Vibe Music Studio 606 – recording (track 1)
- SM Wavelet Studio – recording, engineered for mix (track 6), digital editing (track 3, 6)
- Golden Bell Tree Sound – recording (track 6)
- Sound Pool Studio – digital editing (track 1)
- 77F Studio – digital editing (track 4)
- SM Blue Ocean Studio – mixing (track 1, 5)
- SM Blue Cup Studio – mixing (track 2)
- SM Starlight Studio – mixing (track 3, 6)
- SM Big Shot Studio – mixing (track 4)
- 821 Sound – mastering (all tracks)

Personnel

- Aespa – vocals, background vocals (all tracks)
- Leslie (XYXX) – lyrics (track 1)
- Marcus "MarcLo" Lomax – composition (track 1)
- Neil Ormandy – producer, composition, arrangement (track 1)
- Rosina "Soaky Siren" Russell – composition, background vocals (track 1)
- Lewis Jankel a.k.a. Shift K3Y – producer, composition, arrangement (track 1)
- Hyun Ji-won – lyrics (track 2)
- Imlay – producer, composition, arrangement, vocal directing, synthesizer, FX, instrumental (track 2)
- Ejae – composition (track 2)
- Kirsten Collins – composition (track 2)
- Lee Hye-yum (Jam Factory) – lyrics (track 3)
- Honey Noise (The Hub) – producer, composition, arrangement, drums, bass, piano, synthesizer, programming (track 3)
- Brown Panda (The Hub) – producer, composition, arrangement, drums, bass, piano, synthesizer, programming (track 3)
- Frankie Day (The Hub) – composition (track 3)
- Chanti (The Hub) – composition (track 3)
- Lee Eun-hwa (153/Joombas) – lyrics (track 4)
- Didrik Thott – composition (track 4)
- Sebastian Thott – producer, composition, arrangement, drums, bass, synthesizer, programming (track 4)
- Maria Marcus – composition (track 4)
- Ji Ye-won (153/Joombas) – lyrics (track 5)
- Sofia Kay – composition (track 5)
- Chantry Johnson – producer, composition, arrangement (track 5)
- Noémie Legrand – composition (track 5)
- Lee Seu-ran – lyrics (track 6)
- Fabian Torsson a.k.a. Phat Fabe – producer, composition, arrangement (track 6)
- Moa "Cazzi Opeia" Carlebecker – composition (track 6)
- Ellen Berg – composition (track 6)
- Nermin Harambašić – composition (track 6)
- Maxx Song – vocal directing (track 1)
- Emily Yeonseo Kim – vocal directing (track 1, 5–6)
- Realmeee – vocal directing (track 2)
- MinGtion – vocal directing (track 3)
- Red Anne – vocal directing (track 3–4)
- Saay – vocal directing (track 5)
- Kriz – background vocals (track 1)
- Kwon Ae-jin – background vocals (track 2)
- Jeong Jae-won – recording (track 1–3, 5), digital editing (track 5)
- Noh Min-ji – recording (track 1, 3), digital editing, engineered for mix (track 1)
- Kim Joo-hyun – recording (track 1–2, 4), digital editing, engineered for mix (track 2)
- Kwak Jeong-shin – recording (track 1)
- Kang Eun-ji – recording, engineered for mix (track 6), digital editing (track 3, 6)
- Kim Kwang-min – recording (track 6)
- Jeong Ho-jin – digital editing (track 1)
- Woo Min-jeong – digital editing (track 4)
- Kim Cheol-sun – mixing (track 1, 5)
- Jung Eui-seok – mixing (track 2)
- Jeong Yoo-ra – mixing (track 3, 6)
- Lee Min-kyu – mixing (track 4)
- Kwon Nam-woo – mastering (all tracks)

== Charts ==
=== Weekly charts ===
Weekly chart performance for Whiplash
Chart (2024)	Peak position
Austrian Albums (Ö3 Austria)	64
Belgian Albums (Ultratop Flanders)	77
Belgian Albums (Ultratop Wallonia)	155
Croatian International Albums (HDU)	10
French Albums (SNEP)	79
Japanese Albums (Oricon)	4
Japanese Combined Albums (Oricon)	4
Japanese Hot Albums (Billboard Japan)	17
Nigerian Albums (TurnTable)	74
Portuguese Albums (AFP)	150
South Korean Albums (Circle)	1
UK Album Downloads (Official Charts)	53
US Billboard 200	50
US Independent Albums (Billboard)	9
US World Albums (Billboard)	2

=== Monthly charts ===
Monthly chart performance for Whiplash
Chart (2024)	Peak position
Japanese Albums (Oricon)	5
South Korean Albums (Circle)	2

=== Year-end charts ===
2024 year-end chart performance for Whiplash
Chart (2024)	Position
Japanese Albums (Oricon)	94
South Korean Albums (Circle)	22

2025 year-end chart performance for Whiplash
Chart (2025)	Position
Japanese Hot Albums (Billboard Japan)	45

== Certifications ==
Certifications for Whiplash
Region	Certification	Certified units/sales
South Korea (KMCA)	Million	1,000,000^{^}
^{^} Shipments figures based on certification alone.

== Release history ==
Release history for Whiplash
Region	Date	Format	Label
Various	October 21, 2024	Digital download; streaming	SM; Kakao
South Korea	October 21, 2024	CD	SM; Kakao
South Korea	February 24, 2025	Vinyl LP	SM; Kakao
