= Text from Your Ex =

Single by Tinie Tempah featuring Tinashe

from the album Youth
- Released: 20 January 2017
- Genre: Hip hop; UK garage; pop
- Length: 3:25
- Label: Parlophone; Disturbing London
- Songwriter(s): Okogwu; Ina Wroldsen; Timucin Lam; Daniel Traynor
- Producer(s): Jax Jones

Tinie Tempah singles chronology
"Mamacita" (2016)	"Text from Your Ex" (2017)	"Find Me" (2017)

Tinashe singles chronology
"Slumber Party" (2016)	"Text from Your Ex" (2017)	"Quit You" (2017)

"Text from Your Ex" is a hip hop song by British rapper Tinie Tempah featuring guest vocals from American singer Tinashe. It was released on 20 January 2017, as the fourth single from his third studio album, Youth (2017).

== Track listing ==
- Digital download
1. "Text from Your Ex" (featuring Tinashe) – 3:25
- Digital download
1. "Text from Your Ex" (Billon Remix) (featuring Tinashe) – 4:53

== Charts ==
Chart (2017)	Peak position
Belgian Urban (Ultratop)	42
Scotland (OCC)	27
Ireland (IRMA)	60
UK Singles (OCC)	23

== Certifications ==
Region	Certification	Certified units/sales
United Kingdom (BPI)	Silver	200,000^{‡}
^{‡} Sales+streaming figures based on certification alone.
