= My Last Breath =

Song by James Newman

Single by James Newman

from the EP The Things We Do
- Released: 27 February 2020
- Recorded: January 2020
- Length: 2:35
- Label: BMG
- Songwriter(s): James Newman; Ed Drewett; Adam Argyle; Iain James
- Producer(s): Adam Argyle

James Newman singles chronology
"High On Your Love" (2019)	"My Last Breath" (2020)	"Enough" (2020)

Music video
- "My Last Breath" on YouTube

Eurovision Song Contest 2020 entry
- Country: United Kingdom
- Artist(s): James Newman
- Language: English
- Lyricist(s): James Newman; Ed Drewett; Adam Argyle; Iain James

Finals performance
- Final result: Contest cancelled

Entry chronology
- ◄ "Bigger Than Us" (2019)
- "Embers" (2021) ►

"My Last Breath" is a song by James Newman that would have represented the United Kingdom in the Eurovision Song Contest 2020 in Rotterdam. It serves as the lead single from Newman's debut EP The Things We Do. The song was released as a digital download on 27 February 2020. The song was written by Newman, Ed Drewett, Adam Argyle and Iain James.

== Background ==
In an interview with BBC Radio 1's Newsbeat, Newman said he hoped his "simple, memorable and anthemic" song would help win votes at the Eurovision Song Contest. He felt his song would "connect" with the audience and said he has a "massive opportunity to get my song out to the world in such a big way". Newman is signed to BMG, who worked with the BBC to select and produce the UK's entry. After Newman was approached, he said he had a "little think" before saying yes but decided Eurovision was a "celebration of music". He said, "Since I was a little kid, I've always wanted to be an artist and performer myself. It just feels like the right time to start putting songs out."

The song was written in Scotland when Newman was staying near a loch with his friends Ed Drewett, Iain James and Adam Argyle. Newman said, "We were jumping in the loch every morning. This was January. It was freezing." The lyrics were inspired by a documentary about a diver in the North Sea who had to be saved after getting cut off from the rest of his crew, and the video features Dutch cold water swimmer Wim Hof. Newman also said, "It got us thinking about what you would do for other people." Iain James was one of the co-writers for Azerbaijan's 2011 winning entry, "Running Scared" which was performed by Ell & Nikki.

== Eurovision Song Contest ==
The song would have represented the United Kingdom in the Eurovision Song Contest 2020, after James Newman was internally selected by the British broadcaster BBC. As the United Kingdom is a member of the "Big Five", the song would have automatically advanced to the final, which would have been held on 16 May 2020 in Rotterdam, Netherlands. On 18 March 2020, The EBU announced they had cancelled the contest due to the COVID-19 pandemic.

Speaking about the plans for his Eurovision performance, Newman told British newspaper Metro:

It was going to be me in this tundra kind of thing on top of a big cube that was going to look like it had water projected into it.

And I was going to be stood on top of it with a 3D girl projected into it and we’re going to interact from the outside. I was going to come down from the cube and all the water was going to flood out so it looked onto the screens and it was going to be this crazy thing happening.

== Critical reception ==
Professional ratings
Review scores
Source	Rating
Evening Standard	2/5 stars
The Guardian	2/5 stars
The Times	3/5 stars

My Last Breath received mixed reviews from music critics. In his review for The Times, Will Hodgkinson considered that there "are no disastrous lapses into kitsch, but not much character either" in the "disappointingly tasteful" song, and judged that it is "simply too boring to win." Jochan Emblay of the Evening Standard dubbed it a "nailed-on nil points" and a "by-the-numbers slog of woah-oh balladry," although conceded that it had a "fairly catchy" hook and "would be fine" as an album track.

Louis Staples of The Independent gave the song a scathing review, describing it as "what would happen if a River Island pleather jacket, an X Factor winner's single and your uncle's midlife crisis had a child together" as well as "the MP3 embodiment of that co-worker who needs at least four pints to develop a personality at after-work drinks." The Guardian's Alexis Petridis was also unimpressed, describing it as "serviceably bland," and added that while the song "wouldn't sound out of place on the Radio 2 playlist," it wouldn't "stand out on the Radio 2 playlist"; he also questioned Newman's decision to represent the UK at the competition, given his success as a songwriter, asking "are you possessed of some crazed, masochistic desire to give a succession of brave smiles to the camera and half-heartedly wave a little Union Jack on a stick as Belarus gives the UK a desultory deux points and we’re left for dust on the leaderboard by North Macedonia?"

Others reacted more positively. Joe Anderton of Digital Spy described it as "a perfectly solid radio-friendly tune to launch a solo career with," although added that "it remains to be seen if it's got the drama to really stand out in the competition." BBC music reporter Mark Savage noted that when played on Radio 1 between tracks by Harry Styles and Dua Lipa, "it didn't sound like his show had been hacked," concluding that "it doesn't feel like a winner but nor does it feel like an embarrassment. And that, at least, is progress."

The song did, however, get relatively positive reviews in alternative programming in some countries. The Austria's ORF aired Der kleine Song Contest in April 2020, which saw every entry being assigned to one of three semi-finals. A jury consisting of ten singers that had represented Austria at Eurovision before was hired to rank each song; the best-placed in each semi-final advanced to the final round. In the first semi-final on 14 April, "My Last Breath" placed fourth in a field of 14 participants, achieving 66 points, with a minimum of 4 and a maximum of 10. The song also unsuccessfully took part in Norddeutscher Rundfunk's Eurovision 2020 – das deutsche Finale but it fared well in Sveriges Television's Sveriges 12:a on 14 May, placing in both its jury and televote top tens.

== Track listing ==
Digital download
No.	Title	Length
1.	"My Last Breath"	2:35

== Charts ==
Chart (2020)	Peak position
Czech Republic (Rádio – Top 100)	15
Scotland (OCC)	23
UK Indie Breakers (OCC)	20
UK Singles Downloads (OCC)	23

== Release history ==
Region	Date	Format	Label	Ref.
Various	27 February 2020	Digital download, streaming	BMG	
