= You Love Me? =

Single by Melissa Steel featuring Wretch 32
- Released: 8 July 2015
- Genre: Contemporary R&B
- Length: 4:03
- Label: Atlantic Records

"You Love Me?" is a 2015 song by Melissa Steel featuring Wretch 32. It was first dropped on SoundCloud on 8 July 2015 and will be released on 18 September 2015. A music video was produced for the song which features both Steel and Wretch. Critical reception for the song was positive.

== Background ==
The song was performed by Melissa Steel and features a guest verse by Wretch 32. It features production by Darkchild, which Steel said was an honour owing to her listening to his hits as a youngster and many of them inspiring her to become a singer. The song was also co-written by Sam Romans. The song was dropped on 8 July 2015 on SoundCloud and released on September 11. It discusses a boyfriend who is obviously in love with his girlfriend but has not yet made a proclamation to that effect.

== Music video ==
A music video was created for the song. Both Steel and 32 sing/rap on the track. It features water fights, roof down convertible car rides and dancing in the sun. It was shot in Pink Motel in Los Angeles, and was directed by Max & Dania.

== Critical reception ==
Critical reception for the song was universally positive. Michielvmusic of A Bit of Pop Music described the song as, "an insanely catchy and infectious pop track with some hints of R&B and hiphop" and noted that "the sample with the cute vocals that say ‘You love, you love me, you know that you love me’ will stay in your head forever", further commending her "sweet and soaring vocals that reach high heights". Stagedoor FM called the song "a strong anthem for hazy summer days", while InspireLS described the production of the record as "slick" and Steel's vocals as "alluringly sweet".
