= Name & Number =

Single by Shift K3Y
- Released: 17 May 2015
- Length: 3:12
- Label: Sony
- Songwriter(s): Lewis Jankel
- Producer(s): Shift K3Y

Shift K3Y singles chronology
"I Know" (2014)	"Name & Number" (2015)	"Gone Missing" (2015)

"Name & Number" is a song by British record producer and DJ Shift K3Y. The song was released in the United Kingdom on 17 May 2015 as a digital download. The song was written and produced by Shift K3Y.

== Music video ==
A music video to accompany the release of "Name & Number" was first released onto YouTube on 22 March 2015 at a total length of three minutes and eleven seconds.

== Track listing ==
Digital download – single
No.	Title	Length
1.	"Name & Number"	3:12

Digital download – EP
No.	Title	Length
1.	"Name & Number" (Mike Mago Remix)	4:38
2.	"Name & Number" (Cause & Affect Remix)	5:40
3.	"Name & Number" (Wax Motif Remix)	4:46
4.	"Name & Number" (Chloe Martini Remix)	3:39

== Release history ==
Region	Date	Format	Label
United Kingdom	3 May 2015	Digital download	Sony
