= James Newman (singer) =

British singer (born 1985)

- Born: James Richard Newman; 19 October 1985 (age 40); Settle, North Yorkshire, England
- Occupations: Singer; songwriter
- Instrument: Vocals
- Years active: 2013–2021
- Label: BMG

James Richard Newman (born 19 October 1985) is an English singer. During the 2014 Brit Awards, he won the Brit Award for British Single of the Year as a co-writer of "Waiting All Night", a song by the English band Rudimental. Newman was selected to represent the United Kingdom at the Eurovision Song Contest 2020 with the song, "My Last Breath" before its cancellation. He instead represented the country in the Eurovision Song Contest 2021 with the song "Embers”, which came in last place with nul points.

== Career ==
=== 2013–2019: Career beginnings with songwriting ===
As a child, Newman became interested in music, and he wrote and produced songs with his younger brother John Newman. In his 20s, he established himself as a songwriter in London, and in 2013 he co-wrote Rudimental and Ella Eyre's hit "Waiting All Night". The song topped the UK Singles Chart. Newman won the "Brit Award for British Single of the Year" during the 2014 Brit Awards for co-writing "Waiting All Night" with Jonny Harris.

Later, James co-wrote with his brother John Newman and with Calvin Harris the latter's song "Blame", featuring vocals by John. The song, an international hit, topped the UK singles chart, in addition to peaking in Scotland, the Netherlands, Sweden, Norway, Finland and Mexico. It reached number 19 on Billboard Hot 100 and topped the US Billboard Hot Dance/Electronic Songs chart. Newman was also a co-composer of a number of songs including "Let 'Em Talk" on Kesha's 2017 album Rainbow, and "Coping" for Toni Braxton on her 2018 album Sex & Cigarettes.

Newman was a featured vocalist on several songs including the 2018 hit "Therapy" by the Dutch DJ Armin van Buuren. The song charted in the Netherlands, Belgium and on the US Dance/Mix Show Airplay chart. The same year he was featured on the song "Lights Go Down", a song by the Norwegian music producer and DJ Matoma in his album One in a Million. In 2019, he was featured on the Armin van Buuren song "High on Your Love".

=== 2020–2021: Eurovision Song Contest and The Things We Do ===
On 27 February 2020, the BBC announced that Newman would represent the United Kingdom in the Eurovision Song Contest 2020 in Rotterdam, the Netherlands. He was set to participate with the song "My Last Breath", which Newman co-wrote with Adam Argyle, Ed Drewett and Iain James. However, the 2020 event was later canceled due to the COVID-19 pandemic in Europe. On 17 July 2020, Newman released his debut EP called The Things We Do, which includes the singles "My Last Breath", "Enough" and "Better Man".

On 19 February 2021, it was announced that Newman was reselected to represent the United Kingdom in the Eurovision Song Contest 2021. As one of the Big Five countries in the competition, the UK directly qualified for the final on 22 May. In an interview on Newsbeat, Newman stated: "I feel like everyone wants a party and to have some fun so when I was writing, that's what I had in my head. I wanted something people can dance to, even if it's just in their kitchen". The song "Embers" was released on 11 March 2021. However, the song got "nul points" in the Eurovision final from both juries and televotes and came last.

== Personal life ==
James Newman was born in Settle in the Yorkshire Dales. When Newman was eleven years old, his father left the family, leaving his mother Jackie to take care of James and his younger brother John all by herself, working as a receptionist. John later became a well-known singer, songwriter, musician and record producer.

== Discography ==
=== Extended plays ===
Title	Details
The Things We Do	Released: 17 July 2020; Label: BMG; Formats: Digital download, streaming

=== Singles ===
==== As lead artist ====
Title	Year	Peak chart positions				Album
Title	Year	UK	NLD	SCO	SWE	Album
"If You're Not Going to Love Me" (vs DC Breaks)	2016	—	—	—	—	Non-album single
"My Last Breath"	2020	— (Note: "My Last Breath" did not chart on the UK Singles Chart, but peaked at number 23 on the UK Singles Downloads Chart.)	—	23	—	The Things We Do
"Enough"	2020	—	—	—	—	The Things We Do
"Better Man"	2020	—	—	—	—	The Things We Do
"Alone"	2020	—	—	—	—	The Things We Do
"Embers"	2021	47	80	—	97	Non-album singles
"Infinity" (with Lucas Estrada)	2024	—	—	—	—	Non-album singles
"—" denotes a recording that did not chart or was not released.

==== As featured artist ====
Title	Year	Peak chart positions				Album
Title	Year	BEL (Wa) Tip	NLD 40	NLD 100	US Dance Air.	Album
"Coming Home" (Arno Cost featuring James Newman)	2015	—	—	—	—	Non-album singles
"Daylight to Midnight" (Night Safari featuring James Newman)	2015	—	—	—	—	Non-album singles
"Head Up" (Don Diablo featuring James Newman)	2018	—	—	—	—	Future
"Therapy" (Armin van Buuren featuring James Newman)	2018	37	4	26	15	Balance
"Lights Go Down" (Matoma featuring James Newman)	2018	—	—	—	—	One in a Million
"High on Your Love" (Armin van Buuren featuring James Newman)	2019	—	—	—	—	Balance
"Slow Lane" (Armin van Buuren featuring James Newman)	2020	—	—	—	—	Euthymia
"—" denotes a recording that did not chart or was not released.

=== Songwriting credits ===
indicated a background vocals contribution. indicates a featured artist contribution.

Year	Artist	Album	Song	Co-written with
2013	Rudimental	Home	"Waiting All Night" (featuring Ella Eyre)	Amir Izadkhah, Piers Aggett, Kesi Dryden, Johnny Harris
2014	Calvin Harris	Motion	"Blame" (featuring John Newman)	Adam Wiles, John Newman
2014	Gorgon City	Sirens	"Try Me Out" (featuring Anne-Marie)	Kye Gibbon, Matthew Robson-Scott, Jonny Coffer, Anne-Marie Nicholson
2014	Union J	You Got It All - The Album	"Get It Right"	George Shelley, Timothy Powell, Mary Leay
2015	Arno Cost	Non-album single	"Coming Home" (featuring James Newman)	Vadim Constantin, Katherine Syren-Russell, Johnny Harris
2015	Jess Glynne	I Cry When I Laugh	"It Ain't Right"	Jessica Glynne, Finlay Dow-Smith
2015	Jess Glynne	I Cry When I Laugh	"No Rights, No Wrongs"	Jessica Glynne, Janee Bennett, Andrew Knox Brown, Jonny Coffer, Finlay Dow-Smith
2015	Little Mix	Get Weird	"Love Me Like You"	Camille Purcell, Steve McCutcheon, Iain Farquarson
2015	Rudimental	We the Generation	"Lay It All on Me" (featuring Ed Sheeran)	Amir Izadkhah, Piers Aggett, Kesi Dryden, Leon Rolle, Johnny Harris, Adam Eaglefield, Jacob Manson, Edward Sheeran, Gavin Slater, Lasse Peterson, Maxwell McElligott, James Luke Wood
2015	Rudimental	We the Generation	"Too Cool" (featuring Ella Eyre)	Amir Izadkhah, Piers Aggett, Kesi Dryden, Leon Rolle, Ella McMahon, Johnny Harris
2015	Rudimental	We the Generation	"All That Love" (featuring Anne-Marie)	Amir Izadkhah, Piers Aggett, Kesi Dryden, Leon Rolle, Johnny Harris, Wayne Hector, Julie Frost, Nicholas Gale
2015	Foxes	All I Need	"Amazing"	Louisa Rose Allen, Martin Brammer, Jonny Lattimer
2016	Diztortion	Non-album single	"I'll Be There"	Raoul Chen, Eyelar Mirzazadeh
2016	Netsky	III	"High Alert" (featuring Sara Hartman)	Boris Daenan, Johnny Harris, Daniel Watts
2016	Matoma	Hakuna Matoma / One in a Million	"False Alarm" (with Becky Hill)	Thomas Lagergren, Rebecca Hill, Kara DioGuardi, Daniel Heløy Davidsen, Peter Wallevik, Mich Hansen
2016	Havana Brown	Non-album single	"Like Lightning" (featuring Dawin)	Angelique Meunier, Kesha Sebert, Stuart Crichton, Dawin Polanco
2016	Kaiser Chiefs	Stay Together	"Why Do You Do It to Me?"	Charles Wilson, Andrew White, Simon Rix, Nicholas Baines, Vijay Mistry, Brian Higgins, Toby Scott, Nicholas Coler
2016	Olly Murs	24 Hrs	"Read My Mind"	Oliver Murs, Steve Robson, Edward Drewett
2017	Digital Farm Animals	Non-album single	"Digital Love" (featuring Hailee Steinfeld)	Nicholas Gale, Daniel Heløy Davidsen, Peter Wallevik, Mich Hansen, Daniel Stein, Willem van Hanegem, Ward van der Harst
2017	Brendan Murray	Non-album single	"Dying to Try"	Jörgen Elofsson
2017	Kesha	Rainbow	"Let Em Talk" (featuring Eagles of Death Metal)	Kesha Sebert, Stuart Crichton
2017	Daya	Non-album single	"New"	Grace Tandon, Brett McLaughlin, Mikkel Eriksen, Tor Hermansen, Nolan Lambroza
2017	Jessie Ware	Glasshouse	"First Time"	Jessica Ware, Finlay Dow-Smith
2017	Guy Sebastian	Conscious	"Keep Me Coming Back"	Guy Sebastian, Emma Walker, Lionel Towers
2017	Alexandru	Non-album single	"Sellotape"	Jack Walton, Fiona Bevan, Maegan Cottone
2018	Don Diablo	Future	"Head Up" (featuring James Newman)	Don Schipper, Richard Boardman, Pablo Bowman
2018	John Newman	Non-album single	"Fire in Me"	John Newman, Philip Plested, David "Dehiro" Mørup
2018	Toni Braxton	Sex & Cigarettes	"Coping"	Toni Braxton, David Gibson, Stuart Crichton
2018	The Shires	Accidentally on Purpose	"Stay the Night"	Edward Sheeran, Johnny McDaid, John Newman
2018	Armin van Buuren	Balance	"Therapy" (featuring James Newman)	Armin van Buuren, Benno de Goeij, Michael Busbee
2018	Dan Caplen	Non-album single	"Trouble" (featuring Ms Banks)	Daniel Caplen, Sophie Cooke, Frederik Eichen
2018	Jess Glynne	Always in Between	"All I Am"	Jessica Glynne, Janee Bennett, Sophie Cooke, Bastian Langebaek, Sandy Rivera, Jay "Sinister" Sealee
2018	Matoma	One in a Million	"Lights Go Down" (featuring James Newman)	Thomas Lagergren, Matthew Simons, Tushar Apte, Hanni Ibrahim, Patrick Patrikios
2018	Sigala	Brighter Days	"All for Love" (featuring Kodaline)	Bruce Fielder, Steven Garrigan, Moon Willis
2018	Jess Glynne	Always in Between	"1, 2, 3"	Jessica Glynne, Janee Bennett, Jordan Thomas, Jonathan Mensah
2018	Olly Murs	You Know I Know	"Footsteps"	Oliver Murs, Thomas Barnes, Peter Kelleher, Benjamin Kohn
2018	Zayn	Icarus Falls	"Talk to Me"	Zayn Malik, Alexander Oriet, David Phelan, Fredrick Wexler
2019	Lost Kings	Paper Crowns EP	"Don't Kill My High" (featuring Wiz Khalifa and Social House)	Nicholas Schanholz, Robert Abisi, John Ryan II, Ruth-Anne Cunningham, Ian Franzino, Andrew Haas, Sabrina Bernstein, Ilsey Juber, Alexander Izquerdio, Marcus Lomax, Cameron Thomaz, Michael Foster, Charles Anderson
2019	Backstreet Boys	DNA	"Chateau"	Cole Citrenbaum, Stephen Wrabel, Stuart Crichton, Michael Pollack
2019	Backstreet Boys	DNA	"OK"	Stuart Crichton, Jason Dean, Joseph Kirland
2019	Stephen Puth	Non-album single	"Half Gone"	Stephen Puth, Ian Franzino, Andrew Haas
2019	Louis Tomlinson	Walls	"Don't Let It Break Your Heart"	Louis Tomlinson, Stuart Crichton, Cole Citrenbaum, Wrabel

== Notes ==
Preceded by Michael Rice with "Bigger Than Us"	United Kingdom in the Eurovision Song Contest; 2020 (cancelled)	Succeeded by Himself with "Embers"
Preceded by Himself with "My Last Breath"	United Kingdom in the Eurovision Song Contest; 2021	Succeeded by Sam Ryder with "Space Man"
