= Way We Are (song) =

Single by Kove featuring Melissa Steel
- Released: 13 July 2014
- Recorded: 2013
- Length: 3:21
- Label: MTA Records
- Producer(s): Kove

Kove singles chronology
"Gobble" / "Melisma" (2014)	"Way We Are" (2014)	"Hurts" (2015)

Melissa Steel singles chronology
"Way We Are" (2014)	"Kisses for Breakfast" (2014)

"Way We Are" is a song by British electronic musician Kove featuring vocals from Melissa Steel. It was released as a digital download on 13 July 2014 in the Netherlands. The song has peaked at number 30 on the UK Singles Chart, number 38 on the Scottish Singles Chart and number seven on the UK Dance Chart.

The song appeared in a nightclub scene in 'Whoever He Is', the second ever episode of the TV series Power.

== Music video ==
A music video to accompany the release of "Way We Are" was first released onto YouTube on 2 June 2014, at a total length of three minutes and twenty-two seconds.

== Track listing ==
Digital download – single
No.	Title	Length
1.	"Way We Are" (featuring Melissa Steel)	3:21

Digital download – EP
No.	Title	Length
1.	"Way We Are" (featuring Melissa Steel) (Extended Mix)	4:36
2.	"Way We Are" (featuring Melissa Steel) (Dub Mix)	4:36
3.	"Way We Are" (featuring Melissa Steel) (174 Mix)	3:51
4.	"Liberator"	3:51

Digital download – remixes
No.	Title	Length
1.	"Way We Are" (featuring Melissa Steel) (Preditah Remix)	4:11
2.	"Way We Are" (featuring Melissa Steel) (Apexape Remix)	5:18

== Chart performance ==
On 16 July 2014, the song was at number 17 on The Official Chart Update. On July 20, 2014, the song entered the UK Singles Chart at number 30, the song also entered the UK Dance Chart at number 7 and number 38 on the Scottish Singles Chart.

== Charts ==
Chart (2014)	Peak position
Scotland (OCC)	38
UK Dance (OCC)	7
UK Singles (OCC)	30

== Release history ==
Region	Date	Format	Label
United Kingdom	13 July 2014	Digital download	MTA Records
