= Mamacita (Tinie Tempah song) =

Single by Tinie Tempah featuring Wizkid

from the album Youth
- Released: 8 July 2016
- Length: 3:41
- Label: Parlophone; Disturbing London
- Songwriter(s): Patrick Okogwu; Ayodeji Ibrahim Balogun; Janée Bennett; St Aubyn Antonio Levy; Reinaldo Gonzalez Alvarez; Marlysse Rose Simmons
- Producer(s): Bless Beats

Tinie Tempah singles chronology
"Girls Like" (2016)	"Mamacita" (2016)	"Text from Your Ex" (2017)

Wizkid singles chronology
"One Dance" (2016)	"Mamacita" (2016)	"Like This" (2016)

"Mamacita" is a song by British rapper Tinie Tempah. It was released on 8 July 2016, as the third single from his third studio album, Youth (2017). The song, produced by Bless Beats, features vocals from Nigerian singer Wizkid.

== Music video ==
The song's music video premiered on 4 July 2016, via Tempah's official YouTube channel. It was directed by Craig Moore and was filmed in Dominican Republic.

== Charts ==
Chart (2016)	Peak position
Ireland (IRMA)	71
Scotland (OCC)	43
UK Singles (OCC)	45

== Certifications ==
Region	Certification	Certified units/sales
United Kingdom (BPI)	Silver	200,000^{‡}
^{‡} Sales+streaming figures based on certification alone.
