= I Know (Shift K3Y song) =

Single by Shift K3Y
- Released: 21 September 2014
- Genre: Deep house
- Length: 3:14 (radio edit); 4:36 (extended mix)
- Label: Columbia; Sony
- Songwriter: Lewis Shay Jankel
- Producer: Shift K3Y

Shift K3Y singles chronology
"Touch" (2014)	"I Know" (2014)	"Name & Number" (2015)

"I Know" is a song by British record producer and DJ Shift K3Y. The song was released in the United Kingdom on 21 September 2014 as a digital download. The song peaked at number 25 on the UK Singles Chart. It was written and produced by Shift K3Y.

== Music video ==
A music video to accompany the release of "I Know" was first released onto YouTube on 12 August 2014. The video has accumulated over sixty million views.

== Track listing ==
Digital download – single
No.	Title	Length
1.	"I Know" (Radio Edit)	3:14

Digital download – EP
No.	Title	Length
1.	"I Know" (Extended)	4:36
2.	"I Know" (Shift K3Y Remix)	4:06
3.	"I Know" (Bee's Knees Remix)	5:02
4.	"I Know" (Tough Love Remix)	5:15
5.	"I Know" (New World Sound Remix)	3:41
6.	"I Know" (AC Slater Remix)	4:18
7.	"I Know" (Sonny Alven Remix)	5:03
8.	"I Know" (Worthy Remix)	5:40

== Charts ==
Chart (2014)	Peak position
Scottish Singles Sales (Official Charts)	23
UK Dance (Official Charts)	6
UK Singles (Official Charts)	25

== Certifications ==
Region	Certification	Certified units/sales
United Kingdom (BPI)	Silver	200,000^{‡}
^{‡} Sales+streaming figures based on certification alone.
