= All I Am (Jess Glynne song) =

Single by Jess Glynne

from the album Always In Between
- Released: 17 August 2018
- Genre: House
- Length: 3:39
- Label: Atlantic
- Songwriter(s): Jessica Glynne; Janee Bennett; James Newman; Sophie Cooke; Bastian Langebaek; Sandy Rivera; Jay "Sinister" Sealee
- Producer(s): Mark Ralph

Jess Glynne singles chronology
"I'll Be There" (2018)	"All I Am" (2018)	"So Real (Warriors)" (2018)

Music video
- "All I Am" on YouTube

"All I Am" is a song by English singer-songwriter Jess Glynne. It was released through Atlantic on 17 August 2018 as the second single from her second studio album, Always In Between (2018). It contains a sample replay of Kings of Tomorrow's 2000 single "Finally" bass line performed and produced by Mark Summers of Scorccio.

== Track listing ==
Digital download
No.	Title	Length
1.	"All I Am"	3:38

Digital download
No.	Title	Length
1.	"All I Am" (THRDL!FE Remix)	3:42

== Charts ==
Chart (2018)	Peak position
Australia (ARIA)	92
Belgium (Ultratip Bubbling Under Flanders)	23
Belgium Dance (Ultratop Flanders)	18
Belgium (Ultratop 50 Wallonia)	38
Belgium Dance (Ultratop Wallonia)	10
Croatia Airplay (HRT)	14
Europe (Euro Digital Songs)	6
Germany (Airplay Chart)	30
Hungary (Rádiós Top 40)	32
Ireland (IRMA)	10
Italy (FIMI)	78
Mexico Ingles Airplay (Billboard)	7
Netherlands (Dutch Top 40 Tipparade)	4
Netherlands (Single Top 100)	60
New Zealand Hot Singles (RMNZ)	19
Romania (Airplay 100)	65
Scotland (OCC)	2
Slovakia (Rádio Top 100)	28
Slovakia (Singles Digitál Top 100)	99
Slovenia (SloTop50)	33
Sweden Heatseeker (Sverigetopplistan)	19
UK Singles (OCC)	7
US Dance Club Songs (Billboard)	53

== Certifications ==
Region	Certification	Certified units/sales
Australia (ARIA)	Platinum	70,000^{‡}
Canada (Music Canada)	Gold	40,000^{‡}
Italy (FIMI)	Gold	25,000^{‡}
New Zealand (RMNZ)	Gold	15,000^{‡}
United Kingdom (BPI)	Platinum	600,000^{‡}
^{‡} Sales+streaming figures based on certification alone.
