= I Loved You =

2014 single by Blonde

Single by Blonde featuring Melissa Steel
- Released: 30 November 2014
- Recorded: 2014
- Genre: Deep house
- Length: 3:04
- Label: FFRR; Parlophone; Eton Messy
- Songwriters: Jacob Manson; Samuel Barnes; Lyrica Anderson; Alexander Mosely; Hannah Rockcliffe; Jean-Claude Olivier; Jeffrey Whitters
- Producers: Blonde; Mark Ralph

Blonde singles chronology
"Higher Ground" (2014)	"I Loved You" (2014)	"All Cried Out" (2015)

Melissa Steel singles chronology
"Drunk and Incapable" (2014)	"I Loved You" (2014)	"Burning Down" (2015)

"I Loved You" is a single by English deep house duo Blonde featuring vocals from English singer Melissa Steel. The track uses interpolations of "More", a song from the album of the same name by Canadian singer Tamia. It was released through Parlophone on 30 November 2014 in the United Kingdom. The song peaked at number 7 on the UK Singles Chart.

== Background ==
"I Loved You" is a deep house remix of the song "More" by Canadian singer-songwriter Tamia, from her album More (2004), and features vocals by singer Melissa Steel. It was announced by Blonde as their second single, following on from "Foolish" and "Higher Ground". "I Loved You" received its debut airplay on BBC Radio 1 by DJ MistaJam on 28 August 2014. On 31 October, Radio 1 made it their "Track of the Day".

== Critical reception ==
KALTBLUT Magazine gave the song a very positive review: "Reiterating Blonde's summery cocktail of upbeat sounds and positive vibes, 'I Loved You' updates the classic attributes of nineties cross over house with an intoxicating blend of piano-focused melodies, sublime beats and a soulful vocal."

== Music video ==
The official music video was directed by Jack Laurance. It was first released onto YouTube on 17 September 2014 at a total length of three minutes and seventeen seconds. Inspired by the 1991 film Thelma & Louise, it is set in Mexico City, Mexico, and features two young women (one of whom is played by Mexican actress Estrella Solís). The video has over 100 million views as of September 2026.

The video begins with Solís entering a large house, while dressed in a leather jacket, a short black skirt and a black hat. She meets a young woman who has just won a beauty pageant, is wearing a tiara, and is crying. Solís removes her hat (which later turns out to actually be a balaclava) and tosses it to her friend. A flashback then occurs: it is revealed that the two girls used to be best friends, terrorising and causing destruction wherever they went, including smashing cars, spraying cans of pink paint on a bus, robbing a diner, setting a pool table on fire and flashing the city from a rooftop. This continues until the girls meet a man who invites them to come to his house. There, he tells Solís' friend that she should be a model and photographs her. She ends up becoming famous, leaving Solís without her best friend, and continuing a humble, lonely, everyday life working in a diner. Towards the end of the video, it returns to the present day. The other girl takes off her tiara in her lavish dressing room, contrasting sharply to Solis' home, and with tears still in her eyes, the video ends with Solís putting the balaclava on, preparing to go back to causing chaos.

Talking about the video, Laurance told Promonews, "I was interested in contrasts. Being 'bad' vs being 'good'. Total freedom vs the trappings of fame/celebrity, and all the vacuousness that goes with it. All framed within a little story about two best friends who drift apart. The idea of contrast really drove the way we told that story. Art direction and colour were obviously a big part of this. DOP Ben Kitchens really did a fantastic job. Most importantly I wanted you to feel like the girl that gets left behind is actually the real 'beauty' and doesn't need a tiara on her head to prove it."

== Track listing ==
Digital download – single
No.	Title	Length
1.	"I Loved You" (featuring Melissa Steel)	3:04

Digital download – EP
No.	Title	Length
1.	"I Loved You" (Extended Mix)	5:03
2.	"I Loved You" (Preditah Remix)	4:28
3.	"I Loved You" (Tube & Berger Remix)	6:20
4.	"I Loved You" (Hamilton Remix)	4:52

== Charts and certifications ==
=== Charts ===
Chart (2014–15)	Peak position
Austria (Ö3 Austria Top 40)	60
Czech Republic Airplay (ČNS IFPI)	42
Belgium (Ultratop 50 Flanders)	31
Belgium (Ultratip Bubbling Under Wallonia)	2
Germany (GfK)	25
Ireland (IRMA)	98
Poland Airplay (ZPAV)	16
Poland Dance (ZPAV)	16
Scottish Singles Sales (Official Charts)	10
Slovakia Airplay (ČNS IFPI)	55
Switzerland (Schweizer Hitparade)	56
UK Singles (Official Charts)	7
UK Singles Downloads (Official Charts)	5
UK Dance (Official Charts)	5

=== Certifications ===
Region	Certification	Certified units/sales
United Kingdom (BPI)	Platinum	600,000^{‡}
^{‡} Sales+streaming figures based on certification alone.

== Release history ==
Region	Date	Format	Label
Australia	21 November 2014	Digital download	Parlophone
Germany	21 November 2014	Digital download	Parlophone
Ireland	28 November 2014	Digital download	Parlophone
United Kingdom	30 November 2014	Digital download	Parlophone
