= Girls Like =

Single by Tinie Tempah featuring Zara Larsson

from the album Youth
- Released: 26 February 2016
- Genre: Deep house; dance-pop; hip hop; R&B; hip house
- Length: 3:16
- Label: Parlophone; Warner Bros.
- Songwriters: Aleisha Bennett; Zara Larsson; Patrick Okogwu
- Producer: Nana Rogues

Tinie Tempah singles chronology
"Turn the Music Louder (Rumble)" (2015)	"Girls Like" (2016)	"Mamacita" (2016)

Zara Larsson singles chronology
"Never Forget You" (2015)	"Girls Like" (2016)	"This One's for You" (2016)

Music video
- "Girls Like" on YouTube

"Girls Like" is a song by British rapper Tinie Tempah featuring Swedish singer Zara Larsson. The song was released digitally in the United Kingdom on 26 February 2016 as the second single from Tempah's third studio album, Youth.

The song debuted on the UK Singles Chart at number 15 and later peaked at number five, becoming Tempah's thirteenth top five single and Larsson's third.

== Music video ==
Tempah previewed a clip onto his Instagram account, showing him and two girls. The full music video premiered on his YouTube account on 17 March 2016. The music video was shot in Woodstock, a suburb of Cape Town. As of October 2022, the music video has over 223 million views on YouTube.

== Track listing ==
Digital download
No.	Title	Length
1.	"Girls Like"	3:16

== Live performances ==
Tempah and Larsson performed the song live for the first time on The Jonathan Ross Show on 2 April 2016. Tempah also performed the song live at Wembley Stadium on 21 May 2016, ahead of the FA Cup final.

== Charts ==
=== Weekly charts ===
Chart (2016)	Peak position
Australia (ARIA)	15
Australia Urban (ARIA)	3
Belgium (Ultratop 50 Flanders)	16
Belgium (Ultratip Bubbling Under Wallonia)	23
Canada Hot 100 (Billboard)	84
Canada CHR/Top 40 (Billboard)	34
CIS Airplay (TopHit)	153
Denmark (Tracklisten)	25
Euro Digital Song Sales (Billboard)	9
Finland (Suomen virallinen lista)	20
France (SNEP)	106
Germany (GfK)	83
Ireland (IRMA)	12
Italy (FIMI)	94
Mexico Ingles Airplay (Billboard)	13
Netherlands (Dutch Top 40)	10
Netherlands (Single Top 100)	9
New Zealand (Recorded Music NZ)	17
Norway (VG-lista)	30
Poland Airplay (ZPAV)	47
Poland (Video Chart)	3
Portugal (AFP)	89
Scotland Singles (OCC)	8
Sweden (Sverigetopplistan)	21
UK Singles (OCC)	5
UK Dance (OCC)	2
US Pop Airplay (Billboard)	28
US Rhythmic Airplay (Billboard)	32
US Rap Digital Songs Sales (Billboard)	17
US R&B/Hip-Hop Digital Song Sales (Billboard)	29
US Bubbling Under R&B/Hip-Hop Singles (Billboard)	7

=== Year-end charts ===
Chart (2016)	position
Australia (ARIA)	90
Australia Urban (ARIA)	13
Belgium (Ultratop Flanders)	64
Denmark (Tracklisten)	59
Netherlands (Dutch Top 40)	55
Netherlands (Single Top 100)	51
Sweden (Sverigetopplistan)	67
UK Singles (Official Charts Company)	26

== Certifications ==
Region	Certification	Certified units/sales
Australia (ARIA)	Platinum	70,000^{‡}
Belgium (BRMA)	Gold	10,000^{‡}
Denmark (IFPI Danmark)	2× Platinum	180,000^{‡}
Germany (BVMI)	Gold	200,000^{‡}
Italy (FIMI)	Gold	25,000^{‡}
New Zealand (RMNZ)	2× Platinum	60,000^{‡}
Norway (IFPI Norway)	2× Platinum	120,000^{‡}
Poland (ZPAV)	Platinum	50,000^{‡}
United Kingdom (BPI)	3× Platinum	1,800,000^{‡}
^{‡} Sales+streaming figures based on certification alone.

== Release history ==
Region	Date	Format	Label
Ireland	26 February 2016	Digital download	Parlophone
United Kingdom	26 February 2016	Digital download	Parlophone
United States	19 July 2016	Contemporary hit radio	Warner Bros.
