= Melissa Steel =

English singer

- Born: Melissa Steel; 6 July 1993 (age 33)
- Origin: Bradford, West Yorkshire, England
- Genres: R&B, reggae fusion, dance
- Occupation: Singer
- Years active: 2007–present
- Label: Atlantic UK

Melissa Steel (born 6 July 1993), is an English singer. She is best known for her debut single "Kisses for Breakfast" with Popcaan and also on Blonde's "I Loved You".

== Career ==
=== Background ===
Melissa Steel grew up in Bradford. She attended Tong Leadership Academy with classmate Zayn Malik. She started performing at age seven and recorded her first self-written song in the studio at age 11.

In 2007, Steel, then 14, uploaded her first YouTube video and built an international fan base of people who would watch her covers. In the midst of building her profile online via YouTube and Myspace, Steel continued her work in the studio and began travelling to London to build her connections.

In 2014, she was signed to Atlantic Records UK.

=== 2014–present: Breakthrough ===
In July 2014, she featured on Kove's single "Way We Are", released on 13 July 2014. The song entered at number 30 on the UK Singles Chart. On 27 July 2014, she released her debut single "Kisses for Breakfast" featuring Jamaican dancehall artist Popcaan. The single peaked at number ten on the UK Singles Chart for the week ending 9 August 2014, becoming Steel's first top ten entry on the chart. She features on Krishane's debut single "Drunk and Incapable", which was released on 12 October 2014 and peaked at number 27 on the UK Singles Chart.

Steel rounded off the year with a MOBO award nomination for "Best Newcomer" and was shortlisted for MTV's Brand New for 2015. Steel also helped Krishane support Ariana Grande on the UK leg of 'The Honeymoon' tour.

In December, Steel featured on Blonde's single "I Loved You", which entered the UK chart at number 7 and is certified Platinum.

== Discography ==
=== Singles ===
==== As lead artist ====
Year	Title	Peak chart positions		Album
Year	Title	UK	SCO	Album
2014	"Kisses for Breakfast" (featuring Popcaan)	10	15	—N/a
2015	"You Love Me?" (featuring Wretch 32)	–	—	—N/a

==== As featured artist ====
Year	Title	Peak chart positions							Album
Year	Title	UK	UK Dance	AUT	BEL	GER	SCO	SWI	Album
2014	"Way We Are" (Kove featuring Melissa Steel)	30	7	–	66	–	38	—	Non-album singles
2014	"Drunk and Incapable" (Krishane featuring Melissa Steel)	27	–	–	–	–	33	—	Non-album singles
2014	"I Loved You" (Blonde featuring Melissa Steel)	7	5	60	31	25	10	56	Non-album singles
"—" denotes a single that did not chart or was not released.
