= United Kingdom in the Eurovision Song Contest 2020 =

- Eurovision Song Contest 2020
- Participating broadcaster: British Broadcasting Corporation (BBC)
- Country: United Kingdom
- Selection process: Internal selection
- Announcement date: 27 February 2020

Competing entry
- Song: "My Last Breath"
- Artist: James Newman
- Songwriters: James Newman; Ed Drewett; Adam Argyle; Iain James

Placement
- Final result: Contest cancelled

Participation chronology

The United Kingdom was set to be represented at the Eurovision Song Contest 2020 with the song "My Last Breath", written by James Newman, Ed Drewett, Adam Argyle, and Iain James, and performed by James Newman. The British participating broadcaster, the British Broadcasting Corporation (BBC), internally selected both the song and the performer. Newman and "My Last Breath" was announced as the British entry on 27 February 2020.

As a member of the "Big Five", the United Kingdom automatically qualified to compete in the final of the Eurovision Song Contest. However, the contest was cancelled due to the COVID-19 pandemic.

== Background ==
Prior to the 2020 contest, the British Broadcasting Corporation (BBC) had participated in the Eurovision Song Contest representing the United Kingdom sixty-two times. Thus far, it has won the contest five times: in 1967 with the song "Puppet on a String" performed by Sandie Shaw, in 1969 with the song "Boom Bang-a-Bang" performed by Lulu, in 1976 with the song "Save Your Kisses for Me" performed by Brotherhood of Man, in 1981 with the song "Making Your Mind Up" performed by Bucks Fizz, and in 1997 with the song "Love Shine a Light" performed by Katrina and the Waves. To this point, the nation is noted for having finished as the runner-up in a record fifteen contests. Up to and including 1998, the UK had only twice finished outside the top 10, in 1978 and 1987. Since 1999, the year in which the rule was abandoned that songs must be performed in one of the official languages of the country participating, the UK has had less success, thus far only finishing within the top ten twice: in 2002 with the song "Come Back" performed by Jessica Garlick and in 2009 with the song "It's My Time" performed by Jade Ewen. For the 2019 contest, the United Kingdom finished in twenty-sixth (last) place out of twenty-six competing entries with the song "Bigger than Us" performed by Michael Rice.

As part of its duties as participating broadcaster, the BBC organises the selection of its entry in the Eurovision Song Contest and broadcasts the event in the country. The broadcaster announced that it would participate in the 2020 contest on 16 September 2019. Since 2016, the broadcaster organised a national final featuring a competition among several artists and songs. For their 2020 entry, BBC announced that they would opt to internally select the British entry due to poor results.

== Before Eurovision ==
=== Internal selection ===
On 16 September 2019, BBC announced that the British entry for the Eurovision Song Contest 2020 would be selected internally in collaboration with BBC Studios and record label BMG. On 24 September 2019, the President of Repertoire and Marketing at BMG, Alistair Norbury, revealed that while the artist had yet to be selected, several entries had been provided by music industry experts including writers and producers. The song, selected in late January 2020 by the BBC together with a professional panel consisting of Norbury, Lisa Cullington (music publisher at BMG) and Jamie Nelson (Vice President of A&R at BMG), would also be produced and released by the label.

On 27 February 2020, the song "My Last Breath" written by James Newman, Ed Drewett, Adam Argyle and Iain James and performed by James Newman was revealed as the British entry during The Radio 1 Breakfast Show with Greg James and The Ken Bruce Show on BBC Radio 1 and BBC Radio 2, respectively. Iain James had previously written the Azerbaijani Eurovision Song Contest 2011 winning song "Running Scared". The song was also presented to the public on the same day through the release of the official music video, which was directed by Charlie Lightening and filmed in early 2020 at the Sněžka mountain on the border between the Czech Republic and Poland, via the official Eurovision Song Contest's YouTube channel.

== At Eurovision ==
According to Eurovision rules, all nations with the exceptions of the host country and the "Big Five" (France, Germany, Italy, Spain and the United Kingdom) are required to compete in one of two semi-finals, and qualify in order to participate in the final; the top ten countries from each semi-final progress to the final. As a member of the "Big Five", the United Kingdom automatically qualified to compete in the final on 16 May 2020. In addition to their participation in the final, the United Kingdom is also required to broadcast and vote in one of the two semi-finals. During the semi-final allocation draw on 28 January 2020, the United Kingdom was assigned to broadcast and vote in the second semi-final on 14 May 2020. However, the contest was cancelled due to the COVID-19 pandemic.
