= Krishane =

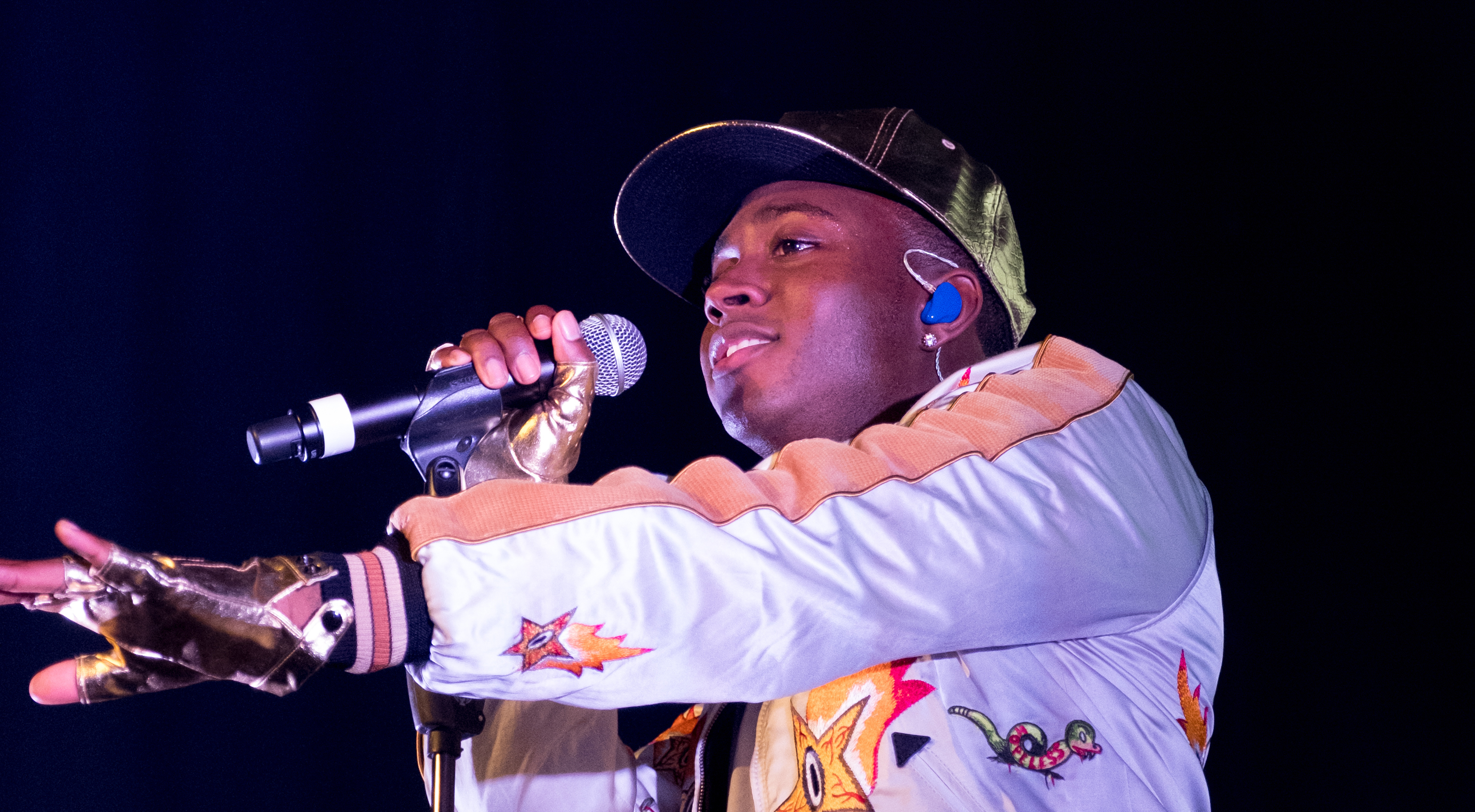
- Krishane live performing at O2 Indigo, August 2017

Background information
- Birth name: St Aubyn Antonio Levy
- Also known as: Krishane
- Born: 30 December 1993 (age 31)
- Origin: Christiana, Jamaica
- Genres: Reggae fusion; pop
- Labels: Atlantic
- Website: www.krishane.net

St Aubyn Antonio Levy better known as his stage name Krishane, also dubbed as The Melodic Bird is a Jamaican pop artist from the parish of Manchester, Jamaica. He currently lives in London and is signed to 1 2 One Entertainment who discovered and developed Krishane following his arrival to the UK from Jamaica. He is best known for his BBC Radio 1 hit single "Drunk and Incapable" featuring Melissa Steel, reggae chart topper "Inconsiderate" featuring Patoranking, "Rebel Yell" with Klingande which amass over 20 million hits and Eastern Europe hit collaboration track "Lock My Hips" with Romanian singer Karmen, which Krishane co-wrote and co-produced. Krishane is also a rising star in songwriting circles worldwide; he has co-written songs for the likes of Tinie Tempah, including the UK No. 1 hit "Not Letting Go" featuring Jess Glynne. He also co-wrote "Mamacita" featuring Wizkid.

== Early life ==
Krishane was born in the parish of Clarendon, Jamaica then later moved to Manchester where he was raised in the countryside town of Christiana in Jamaica and is the son of veteran reggae star Barrington Levy. Beginning his writing career as an intensely shy six year-old, it was a reluctant Krishane who was persuaded to join the school choir at the age of 11. Dubbed the ‘melodic bird’ by his music teacher, he was approached to join The Teardrops, a boy band made up of talented singers from the choir. The five- piece enjoyed some local success in Jamaica during their early teens, but when Krishane turned 16, he decided he needed to be a solo artist. After graduating from high school with first class honours, eventually Krishane was introduced to the production and publishing company, 1 2 One Entertainment, based in the UK. From there he was introduced to record selling producers and writers to help fine tune and develop his musical craft.

== Career ==
In October 2014, Krishane released his debut single "Drunk and Incapable" featuring vocals from Melissa Steel. The track entered at number 19, first graze in the Top 20 then shortly peaked at number 27 in the UK Singles Chart. It was officially the highest mover on the Shazam Chart and landed at number 3 on the Top 100 Shazam UK Future Hits. Following his debut single, Inconsiderate Featuring Patoranking, it's infectious vibe connected at BBC Radio 1 where it was added to In New Music We Trust as well as at Capital Xtra. Its accompanying video depicted the vibrant sights of Krishane and Patoranking's visit to Ghana. The track scored #1 on the UK Reggae Chart and #1 on iTunes top 100 charts in a number of states in Africa. 2018 set an all new record for Krishane with the release of "Rebel Yell" with highly acclaimed Dj Klingande worldwide. The track gained New Music Friday in seven territories and trended in Italy for weeks back to back, it also landed in the Top 5 on the chart (#2 position).

Krishane is at work creating his line of master pieces alongside Will Simms (Sean Kingston), Michael Angelo (Sam Smith, Jacob Banks), Bless Beats (Jess Glynne, Wiley) just to name a few.

Krishane is bringing his vibrant hybrid mix of melody infused with cultural cross over appeal, to boast his melodic versatility. An unusually gifted talent with a unique way of seeing the world, Krishane has the potential to become a worldwide star, thanks to his inimitable talent, originality and love for music. His motto "Spread The Color" is an extension of his mentality one of which represents his way of how his music impacts the world.

Krishane was included as one of BBC Radio 1Xtra's "Hot For 2015" artists.

== Discography ==
=== Singles ===
- "Typical" (May 2014)
- "Drunk and Incapable" (October 2014)
- "Inconsiderate" feat Patoranking (March 2016)
- "Found Da Boi" featuring Wande Coal (November 2016)
- "Roses" featuring Barrington Levy (December 2017)
- "Rebel Yell" with Klingande (March 2018)
- "Lock My Hips" with Karmen (May 2018)
- "Hit Replay" (August 2020)
- "Upset" (October 2020)
- "Lockdown" with Smash (November 2020)

== Songwriting credits ==
List of songs written or co-written by Krishane for other artists.
Title	Year	Artist(s)
"Not Letting Go"	2015	Tinie Tempah, Jess Glynne
"Mamacita"	2016	Tinie Tempah, Wizkid
"Rebel Yell"	2018	Klingande, Krishane
"Lock My Hips"	2018	Karmen, Krishane
"Play Me"	2019	Karmen, Stylo G
"I Think I Love It"	2019	Alexandra Stan
"Punjabi"	2020	Karmen
"Showstoppaz"	2020	René LaVice, Ayo Beats, Krishane
"Belladonna"	2020	Karmen, BRUJA

== Tours ==
=== Support act ===
- The Honeymoon Tour (Ariana Grande) - Glasgow, Birmingham, Manchester and The O2 Arena in London
