= Not Letting Go =

Single by Tinie Tempah featuring Jess Glynne

from the album Youth
- Released: 21 June 2015
- Genre: Hip hop; R&B; pop-rap
- Length: 3:48
- Label: Parlophone
- Songwriters: Patrick Okogwu; Jess Glynne; Gareth Keane; Krishane; Lewis Jankel; Janee Bennett; Jermaine Jackson
- Producer: Bless Beats

Tinie Tempah singles chronology
"Tears Run Dry" (2014)	"Not Letting Go" (2015)	"Turn the Music Louder (Rumble)" (2015)

Jess Glynne singles chronology
"Hold My Hand" (2015)	"Not Letting Go" (2015)	"Don't Be So Hard on Yourself" (2015)

"Not Letting Go" is a song by British rapper Tinie Tempah featuring the vocals of British singer Jess Glynne. The song was released as a digital download in the United Kingdom on 21 June 2015 as the lead single for his third studio album Youth. It also appears on the deluxe version of Glynne's debut album, I Cry When I Laugh (2015). "Not Letting Go" samples the song "Not for Long" by American rapper B.o.B and also contains a sample from "There's a Better Way" from Jermaine Jackson's 1982 album "Let Me Tickle Your Fancy".

The song entered at the top of the UK Singles Chart, giving Tempah his sixth UK chart-topper (more than any other artist during the 2010s) and Glynne her fourth. Tempah overtook Dizzee Rascal for most number-one singles by a British rap artist.

== Background ==
Talking to Digital Spy, Tinie Tempah said, "I've been a fan of Jess since I heard her song 'Home'. We met properly at the Brits last year and spoke about doing something together. We both had crazy summers and kept bumping into each other at festivals. We eventually set a date for studio with Bless Beats, who produced the track, and it just kind of happened." He also said "Both being Londoners, I wanted to make a song that captured that London summertime feeling which is always the best time of the year for me and the time where I've had my most romantic experience. So it's an ode to a girl I met and our experiences in this amazing city we call home – London!"

== Accolades ==
The song finished the year as the 36th-best-selling song of 2015 in the United Kingdom.

== Music video ==
The music video was directed by Charlie Robins and Joe Alexander. It features both Tempah and Glynne, and was shot in Brockwell Park and Brixton.

== Track listing ==
Digital download
No.	Title	Length
1.	"Not Letting Go" (featuring Jess Glynne)	3:48

Digital download – Remixes
No.	Title	Length
1.	"Not Letting Go" (XYconstant Remix)	4:48
2.	"Not Letting Go" (Matrix & Futurebound Remix)	4:20
3.	"Not Letting Go" (TroyBoi Remix)	4:28
4.	"Not Letting Go" (All About She Remix)	4:18
5.	"Not Letting Go" (Show N Prove Remix)	3:15

== Live performances ==
Tempah performed the song with Sasha Keable on The Graham Norton Show, as Glynne was having surgery on her vocal chords.

== Charts ==
=== Weekly charts ===
Chart (2015)	Peak position
Australia (ARIA)	24
Belgium (Ultratip Bubbling Under Flanders)	13
Ireland (IRMA)	8
Israel International Airplay (Media Forest)	5
Italy (FIMI)	41
Netherlands (Single Top 100)	98
New Zealand (Recorded Music NZ)	31
Scottish Singles Sales (Official Charts)	2
UK Singles (Official Charts)	1
UK Hip Hop/R&B (Official Charts)	1

=== Year-end charts ===
Chart (2015)	Position
UK Singles (Official Charts Company)	36

== Certifications ==
Region	Certification	Certified units/sales
Australia (ARIA)	Gold	35,000^{‡}
Italy (FIMI)	Platinum	50,000^{‡}
New Zealand (RMNZ)	Platinum	30,000^{‡}
United Kingdom (BPI)	Platinum	600,000^{‡}
^{‡} Sales+streaming figures based on certification alone.

== Release history ==
Region	Date	Format	Label
Ireland	19 June 2015	Digital download	Parlophone
United Kingdom	21 June 2015	Digital download	Parlophone
