= Drunk and Incapable =

Single by Krishane featuring Melissa Steel
- Released: 12 October 2014
- Recorded: 2013/14
- Genre: Dancehall
- Length: 3:21
- Label: Atlantic
- Songwriters: Bless Beats, Jin Jin, Krishane, Dom Mcallister, Theo Douk, Ryan Griffiths

Melissa Steel singles chronology
"Kisses for Breakfast" (2014)	"Drunk and Incapable" (2014)	"I Loved You" (2014)

"Drunk and Incapable" is the debut single by Jamaican dancehall artist Krishane featuring vocals from British singer Melissa Steel. It was released as a digital download on 12 October 2014 in the United Kingdom. The song peaked to number 27 on the UK Singles Chart. There's also a "Simlish" version of the song for The Sims 4's first expansion pack The Sims 4: Get to Work.

== Music video ==
A music video to accompany the release of "Drunk and Incapable" was first released onto YouTube on 19 September 2014 at a total length of three minutes and forty-two seconds.

== Track listing ==
Digital download – single
No.	Title	Length
1.	"Drunk and Incapable" (featuring Melissa Steel)	3:20

Digital download – EP
No.	Title	Length
1.	"Drunk and Incapable" (featuring Melissa Steel and Beenie Man)	3:19
2.	"Drunk and Incapable" (featuring Melissa Steel and Beenie Man) (Shy FX Remix)	3:22
3.	"Drunk and Incapable" (featuring Melissa Steel) (Fred Falke Remix)	5:02

== Charts ==
Chart (2014)	Peak position
Scottish Singles Sales (Official Charts)	33
UK Singles (Official Charts)	27

== Release history ==
Region	Date	Format	Label
Ireland	12 October 2014	Digital download	Atlantic Records
United Kingdom	12 October 2014	Digital download	Atlantic Records
