= I'll Be There (Jess Glynne song) =

Single by Jess Glynne

from the album Always In Between
- Released: 4 May 2018
- Genre: Pop; synth-pop
- Length: 3:13
- Label: Atlantic
- Songwriters: Jess Glynne; Jerker Hansson; Finlay Dow-Smith; Henrik Barman Michelsen; Edvard Førre Erfjord; Camille Purcell
- Producers: Starsmith; Electric

Jess Glynne singles chronology
"Mind on It" (2018)	"I'll Be There" (2018)	"All I Am" (2018)

Music video
- "I'll Be There" on YouTube

"I'll Be There" is a song by English singer-songwriter Jess Glynne. It was released on 4 May 2018 as the first single from her second studio album, Always In Between. It reached number one on the UK Singles Chart on 15 June 2018, becoming Glynne's seventh UK number-one single, as also first as lead artist since "Don't Be So Hard on Yourself" in 2015.

== Track listing ==
Digital download
No.	Title	Length
1.	"I'll Be There"	3:13

Digital download
No.	Title	Length
1.	"I'll Be There" (Acoustic)	3:15

Digital download
No.	Title	Length
1.	"I'll Be There" (Banx & Ranx Remix)	3:07

Digital download
No.	Title	Length
1.	"I'll Be There" (Cahill Remix)	3:03

== Charts ==
=== Weekly charts ===
Chart (2018–19)	Peak position
Australia (ARIA)	23
Belgium (Ultratip Bubbling Under Flanders)	4
Croatia Airplay (HRT)	1
Czech Republic Airplay (ČNS IFPI)	36
Czech Republic Singles Digital (ČNS IFPI)	53
Europe (Euro Digital Songs)	3
Germany (GfK)	92
Greece International Digital (IFPI Greece)	57
Hungary (Rádiós Top 40)	35
Ireland (IRMA)	8
Israel (Media Forest)	5
Mexico Ingles Airplay (Billboard)	7
New Zealand (Recorded Music NZ)	28
Romania (Airplay 100)	32
Scotland Singles (OCC)	1
Sweden (Sverigetopplistan)	55
Slovakia Airplay (ČNS IFPI)	59
Slovakia Singles Digital (ČNS IFPI)	47
UK Singles (OCC)	1
US Dance Club Songs (Billboard)	55

=== Year-end charts ===
Chart (2018)	Position
Australia (ARIA)	72
Iceland (Plötutíóindi)	80
UK Singles (Official Charts Company)	34

== Certifications ==
Region	Certification	Certified units/sales
Australia (ARIA)	3× Platinum	210,000^{‡}
Canada (Music Canada)	Platinum	80,000^{‡}
Denmark (IFPI Danmark)	Gold	45,000^{‡}
Italy (FIMI)	Gold	25,000^{‡}
New Zealand (RMNZ)	4× Platinum	120,000^{‡}
Norway (IFPI Norway)	Gold	30,000^{‡}
Poland (ZPAV)	Gold	25,000^{‡}
United Kingdom (BPI)	3× Platinum	1,800,000^{‡}
^{‡} Sales+streaming figures based on certification alone.
