= Thursday (Jess Glynne song) =

Single by Jess Glynne

from the album Always In Between
- Released: 11 October 2018
- Length: 3:36
- Label: Atlantic
- Songwriters: Jess Glynne; Edward Sheeran; Steve McCutcheon
- Producer: Steve Mac

Jess Glynne singles chronology
"So Real (Warriors)" (2018)	"Thursday" (2018)	"No One" (2019)

Music video
- "Thursday" on YouTube

"Thursday" is a song by English singer-songwriter Jess Glynne. It was released through Atlantic on 11 October 2018 as the third single from her second studio album, Always In Between (2018). The song was written by Jess Glynne, Ed Sheeran and Steve Mac.

== Background and composition ==
"Thursday" was written by Jess Glynne, Ed Sheeran and Steve Mac. It was the second song Glynne and Mac had worked together on after the former's 2015 single "Take Me Home". In an interview with Billboard, Glynne spoke about the writing process. "We spoke about the highs and lows of being famous and doing the job that we do. It was really cool because for me as an artist, I don't really work with that many artists, and obviously you never know how it is for someone else and you feel like you don't know whether that's just you."

== Reception ==
Reviewing Always In Between for Rolling Stone, Maura Johnston wrote that the track "gently blooms from acoustic balladry into starlit pop anthem", praising the singer's vocal and expressive abilities, stating that "Glynne’s voice growing into assuredness as the self-affirmations pile up high enough to give even the most hard-hearted listener a bit of a boost". Graeme Virtue of The Guardian described the song as a "sombre ode to self-care", stylistically similar to Dido's music.

The Arts Desk's writer Katie Colombus described the song as "a slower song with a more heartfelt lyrical", talking about "wanting to feel beautiful rather than insecure".

== Music video ==
The official music video for "Thursday" was uploaded to Glynne's own YouTube channel on 15 November 2018 and was directed by Joe Connor.

== Live performances ==
- Strictly Come Dancing (4 November 2018)
- The BRITs Are Coming show (12 January 2019)
- 2019 Brit Awards (20 February 2019) (with H.E.R.)

== Track listing ==
Digital download
No.	Title	Length
1.	"Thursday"	3:36
2.	"Thursday" (Jack Wins Remix)	3:18
3.	"Thursday" (acoustic)	4:01
4.	"Thursday" (Nicky Romero Remix)	3:37
5.	"Thursday" (featuring H.E.R)	3:36

== Charts ==
=== Weekly charts ===
Chart (2018–19)	Peak position
Croatia (HRT)	32
Hungary (Editors' Choice Top 40)	36
Ireland (IRMA)	9
New Zealand Hot Singles (RMNZ)	22
Scotland Singles (OCC)	1
UK Singles (OCC)	3
US Adult Pop Airplay (Billboard)	32

=== Year-end charts ===
Chart (2019)	Position
UK Singles (Official Charts Company)	51

== Certifications ==
Region	Certification	Certified units/sales
Canada (Music Canada)	Gold	40,000^{‡}
New Zealand (RMNZ)	Gold	15,000^{‡}
United Kingdom (BPI)	2× Platinum	1,200,000^{‡}
^{‡} Sales+streaming figures based on certification alone.
