= Kisses for Breakfast (song) =

Single by Melissa Steel featuring Popcaan
- Released: 27 July 2014
- Genre: Reggae; dancehall
- Length: 3:31
- Label: Renowned; Full & Bless; Atlantic UK; Warner
- Songwriters: Lea-Anna Gallimore; Andre Sutherland; Derrick Cyrus
- Producer: Wundah

Melissa Steel singles chronology
"Way We Are" (2014)	"Kisses for Breakfast" (2014)	"Drunk and Incapable" (2014)

"Kisses for Breakfast" is a song by British singer Melissa Steel featuring Jamaican dancehall artist Popcaan. It was released as Steel's first solo single as a digital download on 27 July 2014. The song entered and peaked at number ten on the UK Singles Chart.

== Music video ==
A music video was created for the song. It was shot on Hellshire Beach in Portmore, St. Catherine. Talking about the video, Steel said that that was because the song had "a summer, island feel to it". 4Music commented that the song was a "wish-you-were-here" video.

== Critical reception ==
4Music called the song's vibes "tropical" and a "breakfast treat". Singersroom.com called the song "a summer banger", "undeniable [sic] catchy and flows like a summer breeze". Maximum Pop! compared the track's "sugary melodies and sexy innocence" to early Rihanna.

== Track listing ==
Digital download – single
No.	Title	Length
1.	"Kisses for Breakfast"	3:31

Digital download – EP
No.	Title	Length
1.	"Kisses for Breakfast" (Ill Blu Remix)	5:01
2.	"Kisses for Breakfast" (DC Breaks Remix)	4:08
3.	"Kisses for Breakfast" (Instrumental Edit)	3:31

== Charts ==
Chart (2014)	Peak position
Scotland Singles (OCC)	15
UK Singles (OCC)	10
UK Hip Hop/R&B (OCC)	1

== Certifications ==
Region	Certification	Certified units/sales
United Kingdom (BPI)	Silver	200,000^{‡}
^{‡} Sales+streaming figures based on certification alone.

== Release history ==
Region	Date	Format	Label
United Kingdom	27 July 2014	Digital download	Renowned, Full & Bless, Atlantic, Warner
