= Sigala discography =

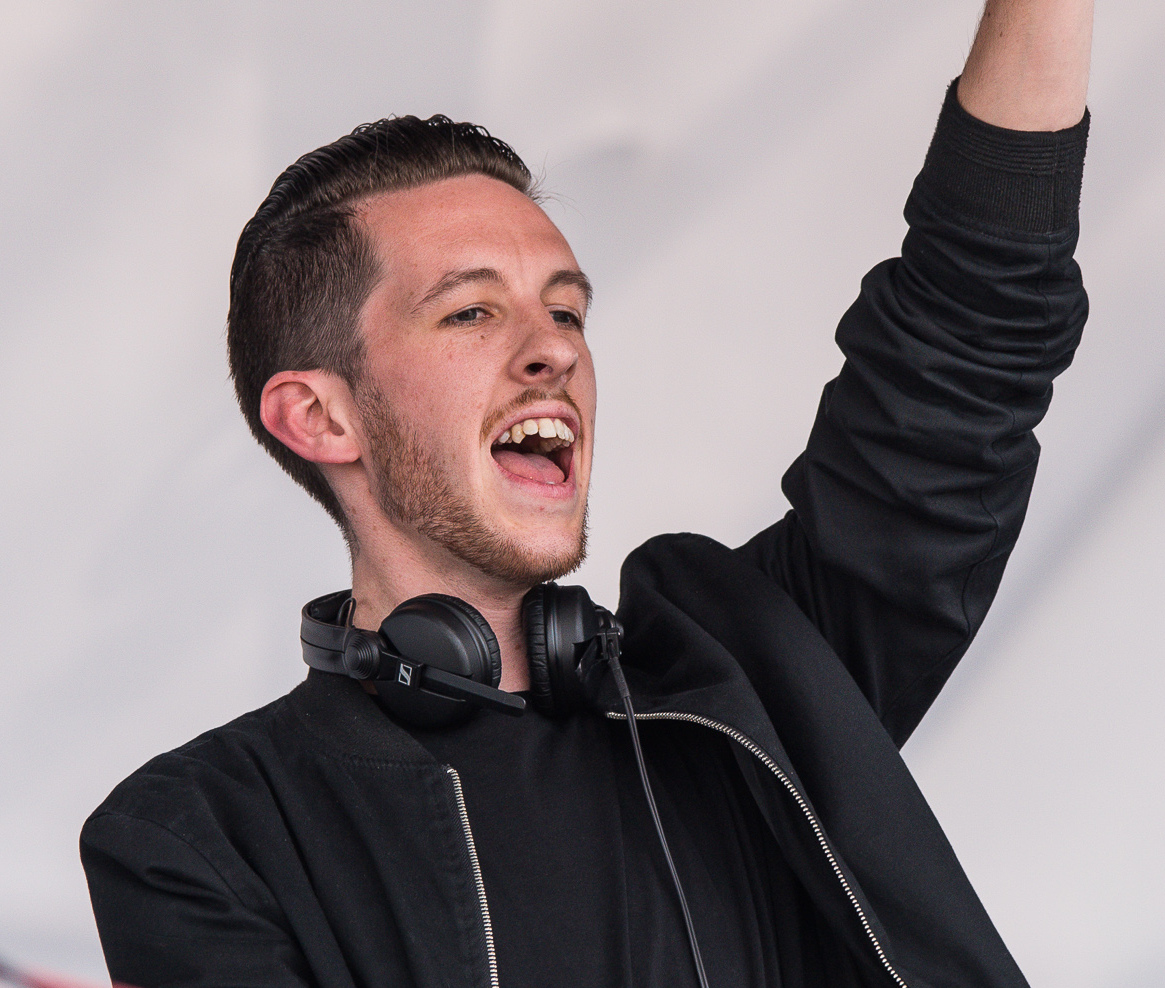
- Sigala at Open Beatz Festival 2016
- Studio albums: 2
- Compilation albums: 1
- Singles: 34

This is the discography of Sigala, an English DJ, music producer and remixer. His debut studio album, Brighter Days, was released in September 2018. The album peaked at number fourteen on the UK Albums Chart. The album includes the singles "Easy Love", "Sweet Lovin'", "Say You Do", "Give Me Your Love", "Ain't Giving Up", "Came Here for Love", "Lullaby", "Feels Like Home", "We Don't Care" and "Just Got Paid".

== Albums ==
=== Studio albums ===
Title	Details	Peak chart positions					Certifications
Title	Details	UK	UK Dance	AUS	BEL	IRE	Certifications
Brighter Days	Released: 28 September 2018; Label: Ministry of Sound, Columbia; Formats: CD, digital download, streaming	14	1	63	102	20	BPI: Platinum
Every Cloud – Silver Linings	Released: 3 March 2023; Format: Digital download, streaming; Label: Ministry of Sound, Columbia	64	1	—	—	49	BPI: Silver
"—" denotes an album that did not chart or was not released in that territory.

=== Compilation albums ===
Title	Details
The Collection	Released: 20 December 2024; Label: Ministry of Sound, Columbia; Formats: CD, digital download, streaming

== Singles ==
=== As lead artist ===
Title	Year	Peak chart positions										Certifications	Album
Title	Year	UK	AUS	AUT	FRA	GER	IRE	NZ	SCO	SWE	SWI	Certifications	Album
"Easy Love"	2015	1	14	10	38	5	3	15	1	8	10	BPI: 2× Platinum; ARIA: Platinum; BVMI: Gold; GLF: 2× Platinum; RMNZ: Platinum	Brighter Days
"Sweet Lovin'" (featuring Bryn Christopher)	2015	3	11	7	115	15	6	—	1	29	31	BPI: 2× Platinum; ARIA: Platinum; BVMI: Gold; GLF: Platinum; IFPI AUT: Gold; RMNZ: Platinum	Brighter Days
"Say You Do" (featuring Imani and DJ Fresh)	2016	5	—	—	—	—	27	—	2	76	—	BPI: Platinum; GLF: Gold; RMNZ: Gold	Brighter Days
"Give Me Your Love" (featuring John Newman and Nile Rodgers)	2016	9	83	50	—	55	43	—	1	— (Note: "Give Me Your Love" did not enter the Swedish Singles Chart, but peaked at number five on the Swedish Heatseeker chart.)	—	BPI: Platinum; RMNZ: Gold	Brighter Days
"Ain't Giving Up" (Note: "Ain't Giving Up" also features on Craig David's sixth studio album Following My Intuition.) (with Craig David)	2016	23	—	—	—	—	57	—	9	—	—	BPI: Gold	Brighter Days
"Only One" (with Digital Farm Animals)	2016	53	—	—	—	—	62	—	6	96	—	BPI: Silver	Non-album singles
"Show You Love" (with Kato featuring Hailee Steinfeld)	2017	91	—	—	—	—	86	—	38	—	—	BPI: Silver	Non-album singles
"Came Here for Love" (with Ella Eyre)	2017	6	53	56	—	76	9	—	2	66	49	BPI: 3× Platinum; ARIA: Gold; BVMI: Gold; GLF: Gold; IFPI AUT: Gold; IFPI SWI: Gold; RMNZ: Platinum	Brighter Days
"Lullaby" (Note: "Lullaby" also features on Paloma Faith's Zeitgeist Edition of Faith's fourth studio album, The Architect) (with Paloma Faith)	2018	6	—	—	—	90	9	—	3	— (Note: "Lullaby" did not enter the Swedish Singellista Chart, but peaked at number three on the Swedish Heatseeker Chart.)	52	BPI: 2× Platinum; IFPI AUT: Gold; RMNZ: Gold	Brighter Days
"Feels Like Home" (with Sean Paul and Fuse ODG featuring Kent Jones)	2018	71	—	—	—	—	52	—	62	— (Note: "Feels Like Home" did not enter the Swedish Singellista Chart, but peaked at number four on the Swedish Heatseeker Chart.)	—		Brighter Days
"We Don't Care" (with The Vamps)	2018	—	—	—	—	—	59	—	85	—	—		Brighter Days
"Just Got Paid" (with Ella Eyre and Meghan Trainor featuring French Montana)	2018	11	—	—	—	—	12	—	9	— (Note: "Just Got Paid" did not enter the Swedish Singellista Chart, but peaked at number five on the Swedish Heatseeker Chart.)	—	BPI: Platinum; ARIA: Gold; RMNZ: Platinum	Brighter Days
"Wish You Well" (Note: "Wish You Well" also features on Becky Hill's debut compilation album, Get to Know.) (with Becky Hill)	2019	8	—	—	—	—	8	—	5	—	64	BPI: Platinum; RMNZ: Gold	Every Cloud – Silver Linings
"We Got Love" (featuring Ella Henderson)	2019	42	—	—	—	—	52	—	17	—	—	BPI: Gold	The Collection
"Heaven on My Mind" (Note: "Heaven on My Mind" also features on Becky Hill's debut studio album, Only Honest on the Weekend.) (with Becky Hill)	2020	14	—	—	—	—	19	—	13	—	—	BPI: Gold; ARIA: Gold	Every Cloud – Silver Linings
"Lasting Lover" (with James Arthur)	2020	10	17	—	—	— (Note: "Lasting Lover" did not enter the German Singles Chart, but peaked at number 7 on the Deutsche Single Trend Chart.)	15	31	1	94	41	BPI: Platinum; ARIA: 2× Platinum; RMNZ: 2× Platinum	Every Cloud – Silver Linings
"You for Me" (with Rita Ora)	2021	23	—	—	—	—	23	— (Note: "You for Me" did not enter the NZ Top 40 Singles Chart, but peaked at number 13 on the NZ Hot Singles Chart.)	×	— (Note: "You for Me" did not enter the Swedish Singellista Chart, but peaked at number four on the Swedish Heatseeker Chart.)	—	BPI: Gold	Every Cloud – Silver Linings
"Runaway" (with R3hab and JP Cooper)	2021	—	—	—	—	—	—	— (Note: "Runaway" did not enter the NZ Top 40 Singles Chart, but peaked at number 39 on the NZ Hot Singles Chart.)	×	— (Note: "Runaway" did not enter the Swedish Singellista Chart, but peaked at number 14 on the Swedish Heatseeker Chart.)	―		Non-album single
"Melody"	2022	31	—	—	—	—	34	― (Note: "Melody" did not enter the NZ Top 40 Singles Chart, but peaked at number 21 on the NZ Hot Singles Chart.)	×	―	―	BPI: Gold	Every Cloud – Silver Linings
"Stay the Night" (with Talia Mar)	2022	11	—	—	—	—	22	― (Note: "Stay the Night" did not enter the NZ Top 40 Singles Chart, but peaked at number 25 on the NZ Hot Singles Chart.)	×	―	―	BPI: Platinum	Every Cloud – Silver Linings
"Living Without You" (Note: "Living Without You" also features on Sam Ryder's debut studio album There's Nothing but Space, Man!.) (with David Guetta and Sam Ryder)	2022	48	—	—	—	—	88	― (Note: "Living Without You" did not enter the NZ Top 40 Singles Chart, but peaked at number 16 on the NZ Hot Singles Chart.)	×	― (Note: "Living Without You" did not enter the Swedish Singellista Chart, but peaked at number 13 on the Swedish Heatseeker Chart.)	―	BPI: Silver	Every Cloud – Silver Linings
"All by Myself" (Note: "All by Myself" also features on the deluxe edition of Ellie Goulding's fifth studio album Higher Than Heaven.) (with Alok and Ellie Goulding)	2022	—	—	—	116	—	—	— (Note: "All by Myself" did not enter the NZ Top 40 Singles Chart, but peaked at number 30 on the NZ Hot Singles Chart.)	×	—	—		Every Cloud – Silver Linings
"Rely on Me" (with Gabry Ponte and Alex Gaudino)	2022	—	—	—	—	—	—	—	×	—	—		Every Cloud – Silver Linings
"Radio" (with MNEK)	2023	—	—	—	—	—	—	—	×	—	—		Every Cloud – Silver Linings
"Feels This Good" (with Mae Muller and Caity Baser featuring Stefflon Don)	2023	93	—	—	—	—	—	—	×	—	—		Every Cloud – Silver Linings & Sorry I'm Late
"You Make Me Feel (Mighty Real)" (with Adam Lambert)	2023	—	—	—	—	—	—	—	×	—	—		High Drama
"Feel It Deep Inside" (with Dopamine)	2023	—	—	—	—	—	—	—	×	—	—		Non-album single
"It's a Feeling" (with Trevor Daniel and 24kGoldn)	2024	—	—	—	—	—	—	—	×	—	—		The Collection
"Like Sunshine" (with Lavern)	2024	—	—	—	—	—	—	—	×	—	—		Non-album single
"With You" (with Ely Oaks)	2024	—	—	—	—	—	—	—	×	—	—		The Collection
"Riptide" (with Jaxomy featuring Ilan Kidron)	2025	—	—	—	—	—	—	—	×	—	—		TBA
"Hello" (with Leigh-Anne and Jonita)	2025	—	—	—	—	—	—	—	×	—	—		TBA
"AM to PM" (with Robin Schulz featuring Zoe Wees)	2025	—	—	—	—	—	—	—	×	—	—		TBA
"We Used to Dance Here"	2026	—	—	—	—	—	—	—	×	—	—		TBA
"—" denotes a single that did not chart or was not released in that territory.

=== As featured artist ===
Title	Year	Peak chart positions			Album
Title	Year	UK	IRE	SCO	Album
"Don't Need No Money" (Imani featuring Sigala and Blonde)	2016	67	77	49	Non-album single

== Productions ==
Title	Year	Credited artist(s)	Album
"Good Times"	2015	Ella Eyre	Feline and Life

== Remixes ==
Title	Year	Original artist(s)
"If We Never Met"	2020	John K
"EveryTime I Cry"	2021	Ava Max
"A Lot"	2022	John K
