= List of UK top-ten singles in 2016 =

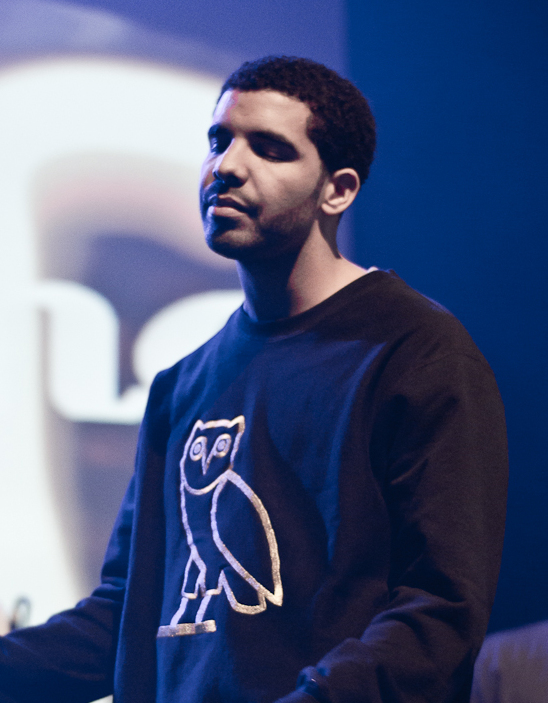
Drake had the best-selling single of 2016 with "One Dance", which spent 15 consecutive weeks at number-one, the longest running number-one of the digital era. He had a further three top 10 singles this year, two of which were collaborations with Rihanna.

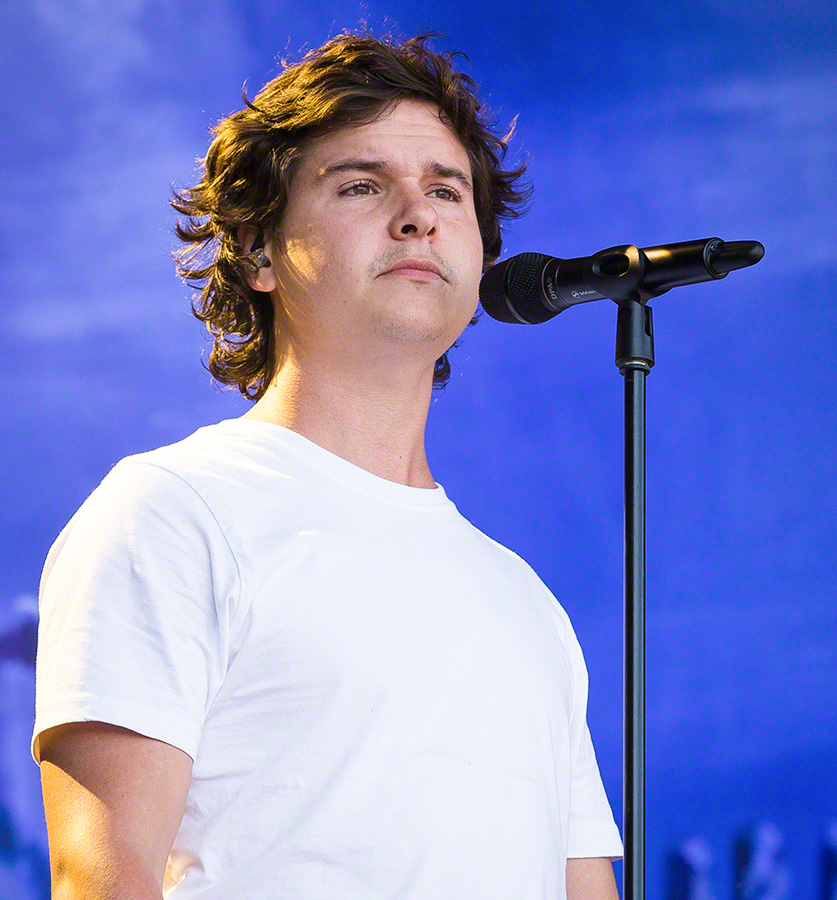
Lukas Forchhammer and his band Lukas Graham from Denmark reached number-one in the UK in February with their song "7 Years", which became the second best selling single of the year.

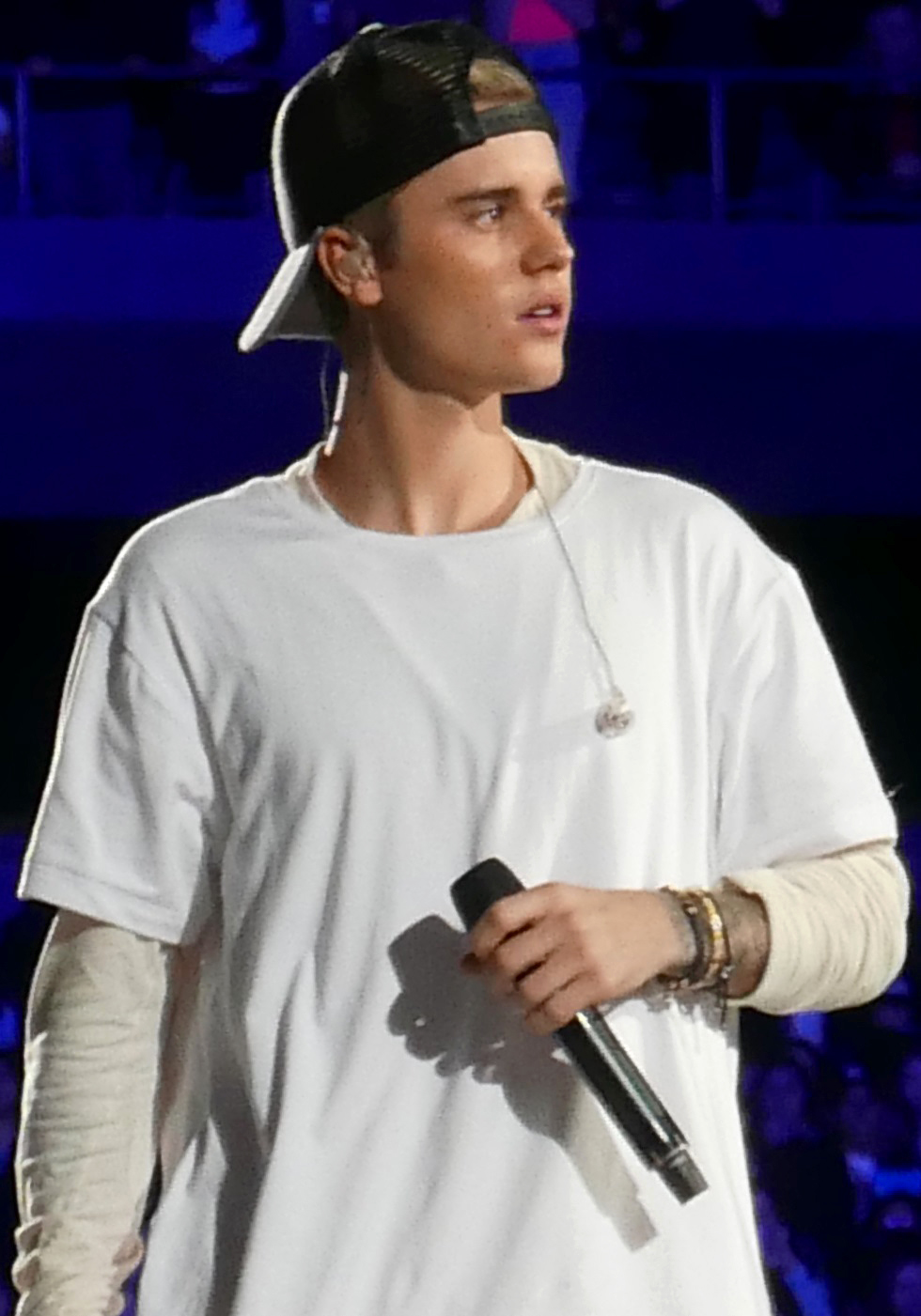
Justin Bieber had five top 10 singles in 2016, the most of any artist. In January, he became the first-ever artist to occupy the entire top three of the UK Singles Chart with "Love Yourself", "Sorry" and "What Do You Mean?", which had all topped the chart in 2015. Bieber also occupied the top two in August thanks to his appearances on Major Lazer's "Cold Water" and DJ Snake's "Let Me Love You".

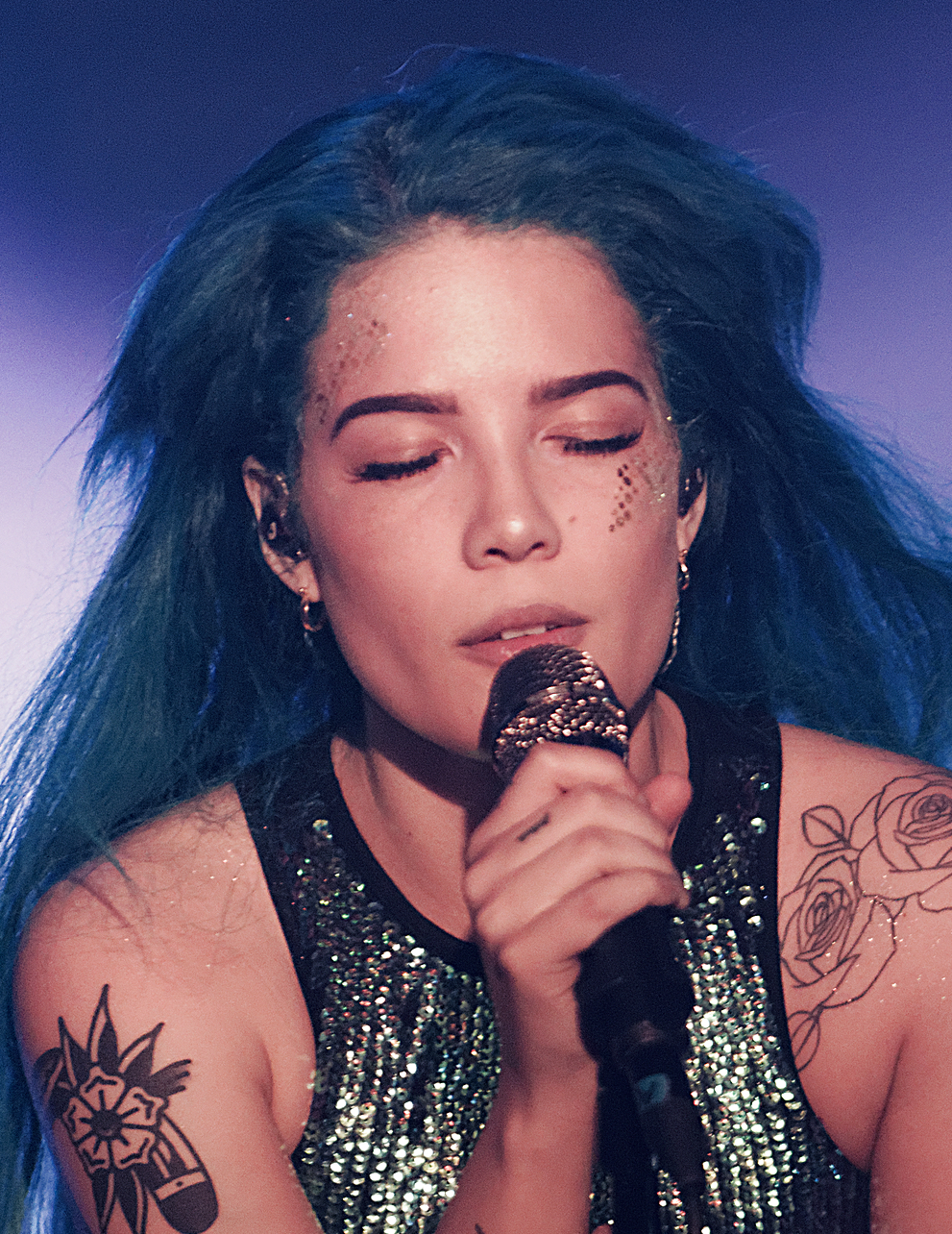
Halsey reached the UK top 10 for the first time this year after providing guest vocals on The Chainsmokers' number-one hit "Closer".

The UK Singles Chart is one of many music charts compiled by the Official Charts Company that calculates the best-selling singles of the week in the United Kingdom. Since 2004 the chart has been based on the sales of both physical singles and digital downloads, with airplay figures excluded from the official chart. From 6 July 2014, streaming figures became incorporated into the singles chart which means that a song will count as a sale, if streamed 100 times. This list shows singles that peaked in the Top 10 of the UK Singles Chart during 2016, as well as singles which peaked in 2015 and 2017 but were in the top 10 in 2016. The entry date is when the song appeared in the top 10 for the first time (week ending, as published by the Official Charts Company, which is six days after the chart is announced).

Seventy-five singles were in the top ten in 2016, the lowest number of unique top 10 singles in a calendar year since 1952, when twenty-five singles made the countdown. Ten singles from 2015 remained in the top 10 for several weeks at the beginning of the year, while "I Would Like" by Zara Larsson" was released in 2016 but did not reach its peak until 2017. "History" by One Direction was the only song from 2015 to reach its peak in 2016. Twenty-three artists scored multiple entries in the top 10 in 2016. Anne-Marie, The Chainsmokers, Jonas Blue, Lukas Graham and Rag'n'Bone Man were among the many artists who achieved their first UK charting top 10 single in 2016.

Drake's single "One Dance" tied the second longest-running spell at number-one with "Love is All Around" by Wet Wet Wet and also the most consecutive weeks at the top spot in the digital era. In January 2016, Justin Bieber held the top 3 spots in the chart in a single week, the first time an artist had achieved this in history. This year also saw the lowest number of unique chart toppers in the 21st century with ten, and the second lowest of all-time, only beaten by 1952, when Al Martino's "Here in My Heart" was the only single to reach number-one, albeit the chart only began in November that year.

"Love Yourself" by Canadian singer Justin Bieber returned to number-one for the first three weeks of 2016, giving the song a total of six weeks on top of the chart. The song had vacated the top spot for one week as the Lewisham and Greenwich NHS Choir secured the 2015 Christmas number-one with "A Bridge Over You". The first new number-one single of the year was "Stitches" by his fellow countryman Shawn Mendes. Overall, ten different singles peaked at number-one in 2016, with Justin Bieber (2) having the most singles hit that position.

== Background ==
=== Multiple entries ===
Seventy-five singles charted in the top 10 in 2016, with sixty-four singles reaching their peak this year.

Twenty-three artists scored multiple entries in the top 10 in 2016. Justin Bieber secured the record for most top 10 hits in 2016 with five hit singles.

=== Digital era chart record ===
The song One Dance by Drake spent a total of 15 consecutive weeks at number 1 making it the longest running number-one of the digital music era, breaking the record previous held by Rihanna and Jay-Z in 2007 with Umbrella which spent a total of 10 consecutive weeks at number-one. It is tied with Bryan Adams' "Everything I Do (I Do It for You)" from 1991, taken from the Robin Hood: Prince of Thieves film soundtrack, which had held the all-time record outright for 25 years.

=== Justin Bieber becomes first-ever artist to occupy entire UK top three ===
On 8 January 2016 (14 January 2016, week ending), Canadian singer Justin Bieber made history when he became the first-ever artist to hold down the entire top three positions on the UK Singles Chart concurrently. "Love Yourself" was at number-one, followed by "Sorry" at number two and "What Do You Mean" at number three. All three songs had topped the chart in 2015.

Later in 2016, Bieber occupied the top two positions of the UK chart thanks to his appearances on Major Lazer's chart-topping single "Cold Water" and DJ Snake's number two hit "Let Me Love You".

=== Low turnover of number-ones ===
Only ten different singles peaked at number-one this year, marking 2016 as the year with the least different chart toppers since 1952, when just "Here in My Heart" by Al Martino reached the summit. However the chart only began in November 1952, making this the full year with the lowest turnover of number-one singles. In 1954, just eleven singles reached number-one, with 2007's total of seventeen the previous lowest this century until 2017, when fourteen different singles climbed to the coveted position. Additionally, just seventy-five singles placed in the top 10 during the year, the lowest number since 1952.

=== Chart debuts ===
Thirty-eight artists achieved their first top 10 single in 2016, either as a lead or featured artist. Of these, two went on to record another hit single that year: The Chainsmokers and Jonas Blue.

The following table (collapsed on desktop site) does not include acts who had previously charted as part of a group and secured their first top 10 solo single.

Artist	Number of top 10s	First entry	Chart position	Other entries
99 Souls	1	"The Girl is Mine"	5	—
Snakehips	1	"All My Friends"	5	—
Tinashe	1	"All My Friends"	5	—
Chance the Rapper	1	"All My Friends"	5	—
Nyla	1	"Light It Up"	7	—
Jonas Blue	2	"Fast Car"	2	"Perfect Strangers" (2)
Dakota	1	"Fast Car"	2	—
Lukas Graham	1	"7 Years"	1	—
Ty Dolla Sign	1	"Work from Home"	2	—
Imani	1	"Say You Do"	5	—
Alan Walker	1	"Faded"	7	—
Wizkid	1	"One Dance"	1	—
Kyla	1	"One Dance"	1	—
DNCE	1	"Cake by the Ocean"	4	—
Bipolar Sunshine	1	"Middle"	10	—
Desiigner	1	"Panda"	7	—
Gnash	1	"I Hate U, I Love U"	7	—
Olivia O'Brien	1	"I Hate U, I Love U"	7	—
Kungs	1	"This Girl"	2	—
Cookin' on 3 Burners	1	"This Girl"	2	—
Cheat Codes	1	"Sex"	9	—
Kris Kross Amsterdam	1	"Sex"	9	—
The Chainsmokers	2	"Don't Let Me Down"	2	"Closer" (1)
Daya	1	"Don't Let Me Down"	2	—
Calum Scott	1	"Dancing On My Own"	2	—
JP Cooper	1	"Perfect Strangers"	2	—
Kent Jones	1	"Don't Mind"	9	—
Twenty One Pilots	1	"Heathens"	5	—
Halsey	1	"Closer"	1	—
Hailee Steinfeld	1	"Starving"	5	—
Grey	1	"Starving"	5	—
Neiked	1	"Sexual"	5	—
Anne-Marie	1	"Rockabye"	1	—
Rae Sremmurd	1	"Black Beatles"	2	—
Gucci Mane	1	"Black Beatles"	2	—
Rag'n'Bone Man	1	"Human"	2	—
Steve Aoki	1	"Just Hold On"	2	—
Matt Terry	1	"When Christmas Comes Around"	3	—

Notes

Zayn, Niall Horan and Louis Tomlinson all launched solo careers in 2016 and had their first top 10 charting singles outside One Direction. Zayn's "Pillowtalk" went straight to number-one, Horan's "This Town" reached number nine, while Tomlinson's collaboration with Steve Aoki, "Just Hold On", peaked at number two.

=== Songs from films ===
Original songs from various films entered the top 10 throughout the year. These included "Can't Stop the Feeling" (from Trolls), "Purple Rain" (Purple Rain, a re-entry following Prince's death) and "Heathens" (Suicide Squad).

=== Best-selling singles ===
Drake, Wizkid & Kyla had the best-selling single of the year with One Dance. The song spent 23 weeks in the top 10 (including 15 weeks consecutively at number 1), sold around 1.95 million copies (including streams) and was certified 3× platinum by the BPI. "7 Years" by Lukas Graham came in second place, selling more than 1.49 million and losing out by around 460,000 sales. Sia's "Cheap Thrills", "I Took a Pill in Ibiza from Mike Posner and "This Is What You Came For" by Calvin Harris featuring Rihanna made up the top five. Singles by Zara Larsson, The Chainsmokers featuring Halsey, Justin Bieber, Rihanna featuring Drake, and Justin Timberlake were also in the top ten best-selling singles of the year.

== Top-ten singles ==
Key

Symbol	Meaning
‡	Single peaked in 2015 but still in chart in 2016.
♦	Single released in 2016 but peaked in 2017.
(#)	Year-end top-ten single position and rank
Entered	The date that the single first appeared in the chart.
Peak	Highest position that the single reached in the UK Singles Chart.

Entered (week ending)	Weeks in top 10	Single	Artist	Peak	Peak reached (week ending)	Weeks at peak
Singles in 2015
10 September 2015	22	"What Do You Mean?" ‡	Justin Bieber	1	10 September 2015	5
5 November 2015	14	"Hello" ‡	Adele	1	5 November 2015	3
5 November 2015	18	"Sorry" ‡	Justin Bieber	1	26 November 2015	2
12 November 2015	7	"Never Forget You" ‡ ^{[A]}	Zara Larsson & MNEK	5	19 November 2015	1
19 November 2015	7	"Sax" ‡ ^{[B]}	Fleur East	3	19 November 2015	1
26 November 2015	17	"Love Yourself" ‡ (#8)	Justin Bieber	1	10 December 2015	6
10 December 2015	7	"You Don't Own Me" ‡	Grace featuring G-Eazy	4	24 December 2015	1
17 December 2015	7	"Sweet Lovin'" ‡	Sigala featuring Bryn Christopher	3	17 December 2015	1
17 December 2015	6	"Adventure of a Lifetime" ‡	Coldplay	7	24 December 2015	1
31 December 2015	8	"History"	One Direction	6	21 January 2016	3
Singles in 2016
14 January 2016	10	"Stitches" ^{[D]}	Shawn Mendes	1	28 January 2016	2
14 January 2016	4	"The Girl Is Mine"	99 Souls featuring Destiny's Child & Brandy	5	28 January 2016	1
28 January 2016	5	"All My Friends"	Snakehips featuring Tinashe & Chance the Rapper	5	4 February 2016	1
28 January 2016	5	"Light It Up" ^{[C]}^{[F]}	Major Lazer featuring Nyla & Fuse ODG	7	24 March 2016	1
4 February 2016	11	"Fast Car"	Jonas Blue featuring Dakota	2	11 February 2016	1
11 February 2016	8	"Pillowtalk" ^{[E]}	Zayn	1	11 February 2016	1
11 February 2016	12	"Work" (#9)	Rihanna featuring Drake	2	3 March 2016	2
11 February 2016	13	"7 Years" (#2)	Lukas Graham	1	18 February 2016	5
11 February 2016	1	"When the Bassline Drops"	Craig David & Big Narstie	10	11 February 2016	1
18 February 2016	3	"Secret Love Song"	Little Mix featuring Jason Derulo	6	25 February 2016	1
25 February 2016	13	"Lush Life" (#6)	Zara Larsson	3	24 March 2016	1
3 March 2016	4	"Hymn for the Weekend"	Coldplay	6	17 March 2016	1
10 March 2016	15	"I Took a Pill in Ibiza" (#4)	Mike Posner	1	24 March 2016	4
10 March 2016	1	"When We Were Young"	Adele	9	10 March 2016	1
17 March 2016	9	"Girls Like"	Tinie Tempah featuring Zara Larsson	5	28 April 2016	1
24 March 2016	11	"Work from Home"	Fifth Harmony featuring Ty Dolla Sign	2	7 April 2016	1
31 March 2016	2	"Say You Do"	Sigala featuring Imani & DJ Fresh	5	31 March 2016	1
31 March 2016	16	"Cheap Thrills" (#3)	Sia featuring Sean Paul	2	14 April 2016	4
14 April 2016	5	"Faded"	Alan Walker	7	14 April 2016	2
21 April 2016	23	"One Dance" (#1)	Drake featuring Wizkid & Kyla	1	21 April 2016	15
21 April 2016	7	"Cake by the Ocean"	DNCE	4	5 May 2016	1
5 May 2016	1	"Purple Rain" ^{[G]}	Prince & The Revolution	6	5 May 2016	1
12 May 2016	15	"This Is What You Came For" (#5)	Calvin Harris featuring Rihanna	2	12 May 2016	2
12 May 2016	9	"No Money"	Galantis	4	9 June 2016	1
19 May 2016	10	"Can't Stop the Feeling!" (#10)	Justin Timberlake	2	26 May 2016	4
19 May 2016	1	"Middle"	DJ Snake featuring Bipolar Sunshine	10	19 May 2016	1
26 May 2016	2	"Panda"	Desiigner	7	26 May 2016	1
26 May 2016	16	"Too Good"	Drake featuring Rihanna	3	7 July 2016	2
9 June 2016	8	"Tears"	Clean Bandit featuring Louisa Johnson	5	16 June 2016	1
9 June 2016	5	"I Hate U, I Love U"	Gnash featuring Olivia O'Brien	7	23 June 2016	2
9 June 2016	10	"This Girl"	Kungs vs. Cookin' on 3 Burners	2	23 June 2016	4
23 June 2016	1	"Sex"	Cheat Codes & Kris Kross Amsterdam	9	23 June 2016	1
30 June 2016	1	"Give Me Your Love"	Sigala featuring John Newman & Nile Rodgers	9	30 June 2016	1
7 July 2016	2	"Send My Love (To Your New Lover)"	Adele	5	14 July 2016	1
14 July 2016	11	"Don't Let Me Down"	The Chainsmokers featuring Daya	2	21 July 2016	1
14 July 2016	15	"Dancing On My Own"	Calum Scott	2	11 August 2016	1
21 July 2016	10	"Perfect Strangers"	Jonas Blue featuring JP Cooper	2	28 July 2016	2
21 July 2016	4	"Don't Mind"	Kent Jones	9	4 August 2016	1
28 July 2016	8	"Treat You Better"	Shawn Mendes	6	4 August 2016	2
4 August 2016	12	"Cold Water"	Major Lazer featuring Justin Bieber & MØ	1	4 August 2016	5
18 August 2016	11	"Let Me Love You"	DJ Snake featuring Justin Bieber	2	18 August 2016	6
18 August 2016	7	"Heathens"	Twenty One Pilots	5	1 September 2016	3
25 August 2016	16	"Closer" (#7)	The Chainsmokers featuring Halsey	1	8 September 2016	4
15 September 2016	3	"In the Name of Love" ^{[H]}	Martin Garrix & Bebe Rexha	9	6 October 2016	1
22 September 2016	9	"The Greatest"	Sia featuring Kendrick Lamar	5	22 September 2016	2
22 September 2016	7	"Side to Side"	Ariana Grande featuring Nicki Minaj	4	20 October 2016	1
29 September 2016	16	"Say You Won't Let Go"	James Arthur	1	6 October 2016	3
29 September 2016	6	"My Way"	Calvin Harris	4	6 October 2016	2
6 October 2016	15	"Starboy"	The Weeknd featuring Daft Punk	2	13 October 2016	1
13 October 2016	1	"This Town"	Niall Horan	9	13 October 2016	1
20 October 2016	9	"24K Magic" ^{[I]}^{[K]}	Bruno Mars	5	17 November 2016	1
27 October 2016	11	"Shout Out to My Ex" ^{[L]}	Little Mix	1	27 October 2016	3
27 October 2016	6	"Starving"	Hailee Steinfeld & Grey featuring Zedd	5	27 October 2016	2
3 November 2016	9	"Sexual" ^{[N]}	Neiked featuring Dyo	5	15 December 2016	1
3 November 2016	15	"Rockabye"	Clean Bandit featuring Sean Paul & Anne-Marie	1	17 November 2016	9
10 November 2016	1	"Fake Love"	Drake	10	10 November 2016	1
17 November 2016	5	"Don't Wanna Know"	Maroon 5 featuring Kendrick Lamar	5	1 December 2016	1
24 November 2016	6	"Black Beatles"	Rae Sremmurd featuring Gucci Mane	2	1 December 2016	3
8 December 2016	2	"I Feel It Coming"	The Weeknd featuring Daft Punk	9	8 December 2016	1
15 December 2016	4	"All I Want for Christmas Is You" ^{[J]}	Mariah Carey	5	29 December 2016	2
15 December 2016	13	"Human"	Rag'n'Bone Man	2	29 December 2016	3
22 December 2016	4	"Just Hold On" ^{[M]}	Steve Aoki & Louis Tomlinson	2	22 December 2016	1
22 December 2016	2	"When Christmas Comes Around"	Matt Terry	3	22 December 2016	1
29 December 2016	10	"Touch"	Little Mix	4	29 December 2016	6
29 December 2016	6	"I Would Like" ♦	Zara Larsson	2	5 January 2017	1

== Entries by artist ==
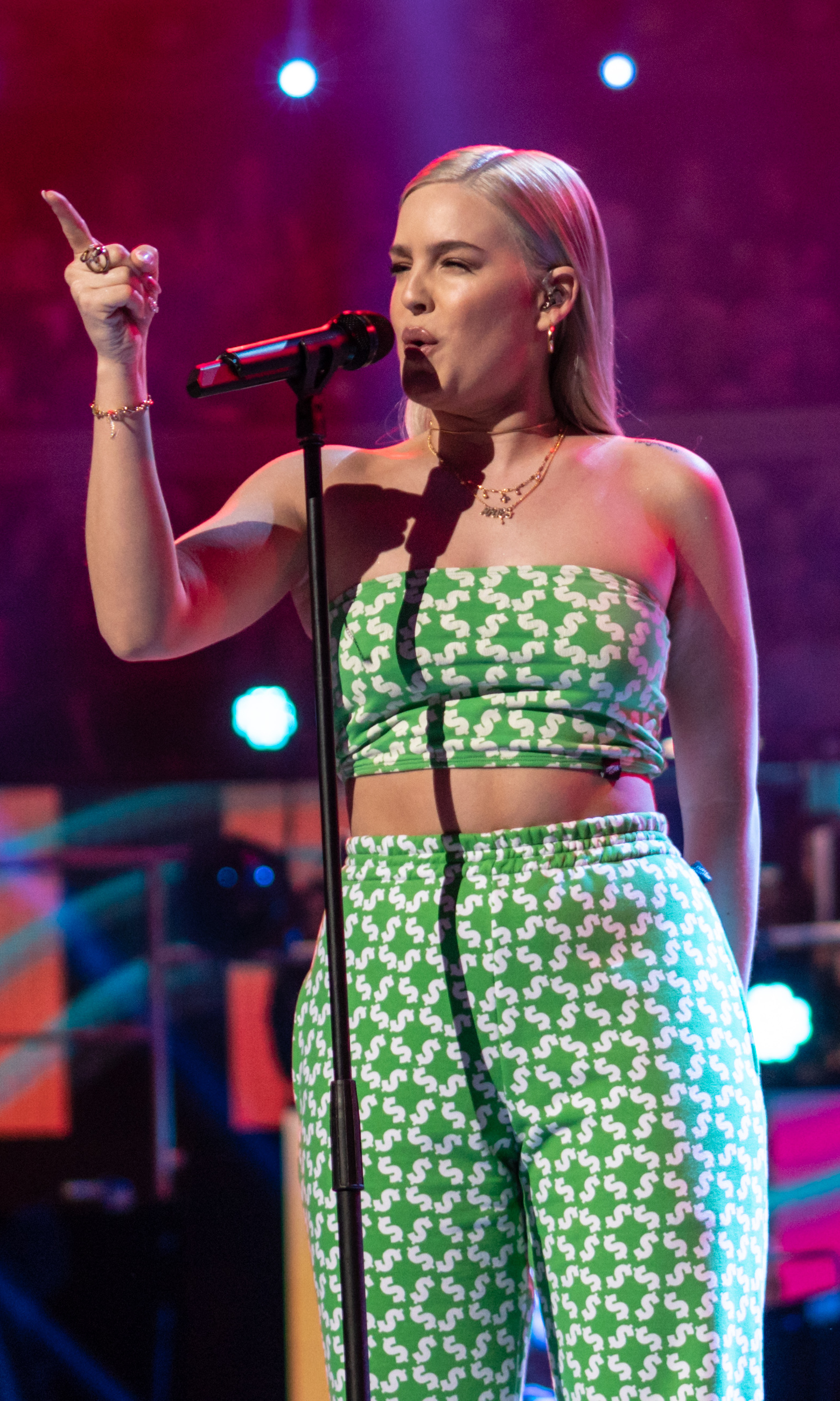
Anne-Marie (pictured) and Sean Paul both provided vocals on Clean Bandit's "Rockabye", which spent nine weeks at the top of the UK charts and became the Christmas number-one of 2016.

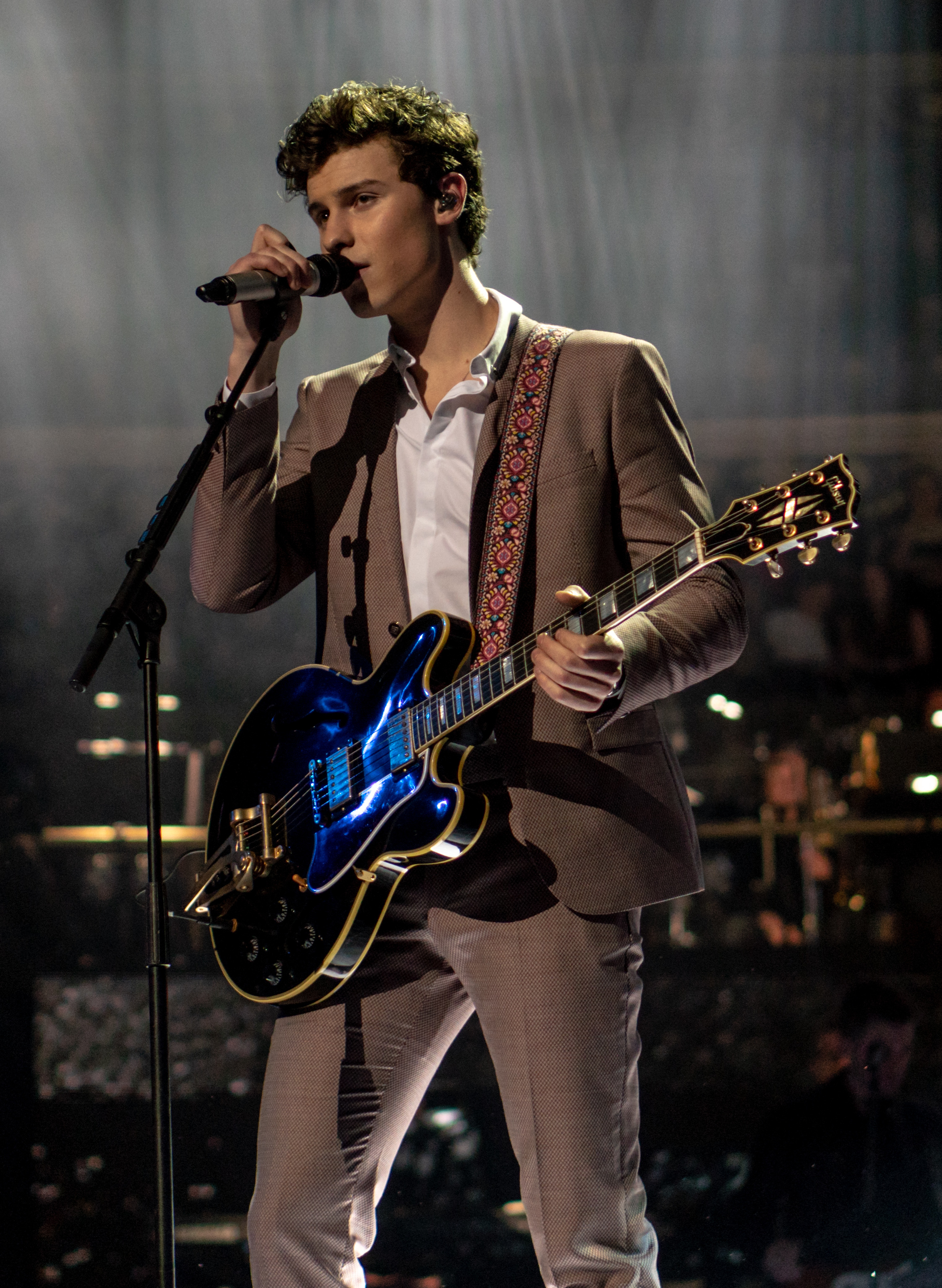
Shawn Mendes made his UK top 10 debut this year with two singles making the countdown, including his debut entry, "Stitches", which reached number-one for two weeks in January.

The following table shows artists who achieved two or more top 10 entries in 2016, including singles that reached their peak in 2015 or 2017. The figures include both main artists and featured artists, while appearances on ensemble charity records are also counted for each artist. The total number of weeks an artist spent in the top ten in 2016 is also shown.

Entries	Artist	Weeks	Singles
5	Justin Bieber ^{[O]}^{[T]}	48	"Cold Water", "Let Me Love You", "Love Yourself", "Sorry", "What Do You Mean?"
4	Drake ^{[U]}	46	"Fake Love", "One Dance", "Too Good", "Work"
4	Zara Larsson ^{[O]}^{[P]}^{[V]}	24	"Girls Like", "I Would Like", "Lush Life", "Never Forget You"
3	Adele ^{[O]}	8	"Hello", "Send My Love (To Your New Lover)", "When We Were Young"
3	Little Mix	13	"Secret Love Song", "Shout Out to My Ex", "Touch"
3	Rihanna ^{[W]}	43	"This Is What You Came For", "Too Good", "Work"
3	Sigala ^{[O]}	10	"Give Me Your Love", "Say You Do", "Sweet Lovin'"
2	Calvin Harris	21	"My Way", "This Is What You Came For"
2	The Chainsmokers	27	"Closer", "Don't Let Me Down"
2	Clean Bandit	17	"Rockabye", "Tears"
2	Coldplay ^{[O]}	10	"Adventure of a Lifetime", "Hymn for the Weekend"
2	Daft Punk ^{[R]}	15	"I Feel It Coming", "Starboy"
2	DJ Snake	12	"Let Me Love You", "Middle"
2	Jonas Blue	21	"Fast Car", "Perfect Strangers"
2	Kendrick Lamar ^{[S]}	14	"Don't Wanna Know", "The Greatest"
2	Louis Tomlinson ^{[O]}^{[Q]}^{[Y]}	9	"History", "Just Hold On"
2	Major Lazer	17	"Cold Water", "Light It Up"
2	Niall Horan ^{[O]}^{[Q]}^{[Y]}	8	"History", "This Town"
2	Sean Paul ^{[X]}	25	"Cheap Thrills", "Rockabye"
2	Shawn Mendes	18	"Stitches", "Treat You Better"
2	Sia	25	"Cheap Thrills", "The Greatest"
2	The Weeknd	15	"I Feel It Coming", "Starboy"

== See also ==
- 2016 in British music
- List of number-one singles from the 2010s (UK)

== Notes ==
- ^{a} "Never Forget You" re-entered the top 10 at number 10 on 7 January 2016 (week ending).
- ^{b} "Sax" re-entered the top 10 at number 6 on 7 January 2016 (week ending).
- ^{c} "Light It Up" re-entered the top 10 at number 10 on 17 March 2016 (week ending).
- ^{d} "Stitches" re-entered the top 10 at number 8 on 24 March 2016 (week ending).
- ^{e} "Pillowtalk" re-entered the top 10 at number 10 on 31 March 2016 (week ending).
- ^{f} "Light It Up" re-entered the top 10 at number 10 on 14 April 2016 (week ending).
- ^{g} "Purple Rain" entered the top 10 at number 6 on 5 May 2016 (week ending) following the death of Prince, having originally peaked at number 8 upon release in 1984.
- ^{h} "In the Name of Love" re-entered the top 10 at number 10 on 29 September 2016 (week ending).
- ^{I}i "24K Magic" re-entered the top 10 at number 6 on 10 November 2016 (week ending).
- ^{j} "All I Want For Christmas Is You" re-entered the top 10 on 15 December 2016 (week ending) due to the song's reoccurring spike in popularity around the Christmas holiday season, having originally peaked at number 2 upon release in 1994.
- ^{k} "24K Magic" re-entered the top 10 at number 10 on 5 January 2017 (week ending).
- ^{l} "Shout Out to My Ex" re-entered the top 10 at number 6 on 5 January 2017 (week ending).
- ^{m} "Just Hold On" re-entered the top 10 at number 10 on 12 January 2017 (week ending).
- ^{n} "Sexual" re-entered the top 10 at number 6 on 12 January 2017 (week ending).
- ^{o} Figure includes song that peaked in 2015.
- ^{p} Figure includes song that peaked in 2017.
- ^{q} Figure includes solo work and recordings with the group One Direction.
- ^{r} Figure includes appearances on The Weeknd's "I Feel It Coming" and "Starboy".
- ^{s} Figure includes appearances on Sia's "The Greatest" and Maroon 5's "Don't Wanna Know".
- ^{t} Figure includes appearances on DJ Snake's "Let Me Love You" and Major Lazer's "Cold Water".
- ^{u} Figure includes appearance on Rihanna's "Work".
- ^{v} Figure includes appearance on Tinie Tempah's "Girls Like".
- ^{w} Figure includes appearances on Drake's "Too Good" and Calvin Harris' "This Is What You Came For".
- ^{x} Figure includes appearances on Sia's "Cheap Thrills" and Clean Bandit's "Rockabye".
- ^{y} Figure includes song that first charted in 2015 but peaked in 2016.
