= Brookes Brothers =

British drum and bass duo

- Origin: London, England
- Genres: Drum and bass, liquid funk
- Years active: 2002–present
- Labels: Viper Recordings, Breakbeat Kaos
- Members: Daniel Brookes; Philip Brookes
- Website: www.myspace.com/brookesbrothers

Phil and Dan Brookes, otherwise known as the Brookes Brothers, are two London-based drum and bass producers.

== History ==
In 2006 they surfaced with "Portal" / "Desert Island" on Danny Wheeler's W10 imprint. This was followed by "Verano", a collaborative effort with Nick Douwma, otherwise known as Sub Focus. In 2007, the Brookes Brothers were exclusively signed to DJ Fresh and Adam F's label Breakbeat Kaos. Their first release was "Hard Knocks" / "Mistakes", receiving major radio support from Zane Lowe, Pete Tong and the Trophy Twins, as well as staple drum & bass DJ's such as Andy C, Grooverider, and Adam F. The double A-side entered the UK Indie Chart at number 25. In 2007, collaborated with another rising drum and bass star, Culture Shock, creating the monster track "Rework". In 2008, the brothers continue to assault the market with a host of big tunes such as F-Zero, Gold Rush, Dawn Treader and Crackdown. They hold residencies in both Fabric and Herbal nightclubs, playing regular national and international DJ sets. Their self-titled debut album was finally released in 2011, under the label Breakbeat Kaos.

== Equipment and influences ==
They both have their own recording studio, situated five minutes apart. They both run custom-built PCs running Windows 7 and Cubase 6.5. Dan uses Fostex PM1s as monitors, where Phil uses KRK Rokit 8s. They mix everything down using a combination of the PM1s and headphones. They use a Steinberg UR824 souncard.

As music influences they cite Earth, Wind & Fire, The Whispers, Dazz Band, Hall & Oates, Daft Punk, Jazzanova, MJ Cole, Photek, Marcus Intalex and Calibre.

== Discography ==
=== Albums ===
Year	Album
2011	Brookes Brothers: Release Date: 6 June 2011; Label: Breakbeat Kaos (BBK007CD); Format: CD, digital download
2017	Orange Lane: Release Date: 20 October 2017; Label: Viper Recordings; Format: CD, digital download

=== Singles ===
Year	Single	Peak chart positions	Album	Label
Year	Single	UK	Album	Label
2006	"Portal" / "Desert Island"	—	Non-album singles	W10 Records
2006	"Someone" / "Promise"	—	Non-album singles	Viper Recordings
2006	"Hard Knocks" / "Mistakes"	—	Non-album singles	Breakbeat Kaos
2007	"The Light" / "Rainman"	—	Non-album singles	Non-album single
2008	"F-Zero" / "Dawn Treader" (Brookes Brothers / Brookes Brothers vs Futurebound)	—	Non-album singles	Breakbeat Kaos
2008	"Gold Rush" (Danny Byrd featuring Brookes Brothers)	—	Supersized	Hospital Records
2008	"Tear You Down" / "Drifter"	56	Brookes Brothers	Breakbeat Kaos
2010	"Last Night" / "Warcry"	—	Brookes Brothers	Breakbeat Kaos
2011	"Beautiful" / "Souvenir"	—	Brookes Brothers	Breakbeat Kaos
2011	"In Your Eyes" / "The Big Blue"	—	Brookes Brothers	Breakbeat Kaos
2012	"Loveline" (featuring Haz-Mat) / "The Blues"	—	Non-album single	Breakbeat Kaos
2013	"Get on It" (Danny Byrd featuring Brookes Brothers)	—	Golden Ticket	Hospital Records
2013	"Carry Me On" (featuring Chrom3)	71	Orange Lane	Viper Recordings
2015	"Anthem" (featuring Camille)	—	Non-album single	Viper Recordings
2015	"Climb High" (featuring Danny Byrd)	—	Orange Lane	Viper Recordings
2016	"Good to Me" (featuring Majesty)	—	Orange Lane	Viper Recordings
2017	"Movin On"	—	Orange Lane	Viper Recordings
2017	"Flashing Lights" (featuring ShezAr & Bossman Bridie)	—	Orange Lane	Viper Recordings
2017	"The One" (featuring ShockOne)	—	Orange Lane	Viper Recordings
2018	"Every Minute"	—	Non-album singles	Drum & Bass Arena
2018	"New Wave" (featuring Georgia Allen)	—	Non-album singles	Breakbeat Kaos
2018	"Headlock"	—	Non-album singles	Breakbeat Kaos
2019	"Good Thing"	—	Non-album singles	Drum & Bass Arena
2020	"Burn" (with Kove featuring Kathy Brown)	—	Non-album singles	Drum & Bass Arena
2020	"Make No Sound" (featuring Liam Bailey)	—	Non-album singles	Drum & Bass Arena
2024	"Enemies" (featuring Mia Kirkland)	—	Non-album singles	UKF Music
2024	"One Wish" (with Ekko & Sidetrack and Britt Lari)	—	Non-album singles	UKF Music
2025	"Memories"	—	Non-album singles	Drum & Bass Arena
2025	"Big Love"	—	Non-album singles	UKF Music
"—" denotes single that did not chart or was not released.

=== Other songs and appearances ===
Year	Track	Artist(s)	Release	Label
2005	"Blue Light"	Danny Wheeler, Brookes Brothers	"Aura" / "Blue Light"	W10 Records
2006	"Verano"	Sub Focus, Howtek, Brookes Brothers	"Verano" / "Arachnophobia"	Frequency
2007	"Rework"	Culture Shock Brookes Brothers	The Third Stage EP	RAM Records
2008	"Smoothie"	Culture Shock Brookes Brothers	Dimensions 3 EP	RAM Records
2008	"Crackdown"	Brookes Brothers	Headroom EP	Viper Recordings
2009	"Crackdown" (ShockOne Remix)	Brookes Brothers	Acts of Mad Men	Viper Recordings
2019	"In the Moment"	Brookes Brothers, Amahla	Drum and Bass Arena 2019	Drum and Bass Arena

=== Remixes ===
Year	Song	Artist
2006	"Pain"	SKC & Bratwa
2006	"No More Eatin'" (with Beni G)	Plan B
2008	"Crazy World"	J Majik and Wickaman (featuring Kathy Brown)
2008	"Star Guitar"	Shinichi Osawa
2008	"Seattle"	The Brighton Port Authority (featuring Emmy the Great)
2009	"Messages"	Filthy Dukes (featuring Tommy Sparks)
2010	"Let You Go"	Chase & Status (featuring Mali)
2010	"In the Summer"	Crystal Fighters
2011	"Traktor"	Wretch 32 (featuring L)
2012	"Must Be the Feeling"	Nero
2013	"Baiya"	Delphic
2013	"Look Right Through"	Storm Queen
2013	"I Need"	Maverick Sabre
2013	"All Lies"	Sid Batham
2014	"I Wanna Feel"	Secondcity
2014	"Feel Your Love"	Le Youth (featuring Javeon)
2015	"Kiss Me Quick"	Nathan Sykes
2015	"The Jam"	Kideko
2015	"Sweet Lovin'"	Sigala (featuring Bryn Christopher)
2017	"Only One"	Sigala and Digital Farm Animals
2017	"Body"	KAMILLE (featuring Avelino)
2017	"Say A Prayer"	TIEKS (featuring Chaka Khan and Popcaan)
2019	"I Could Get Used to This"	Becky Hill and Weiss
2019	"Turn Down the Lights" (with René LaVice)	Benny Page
2020	"Same Love"	Philip George and Salena Mastroianni
