= Show You Love =

Show You Love may refer to:

- "Show You Love" (Jars of Clay song), 2003
- "Show You Love" (Kato and Sigala song), 2017
