= Digital Love =

Digital Love may refer to:

- "Digital Love" (Daft Punk song), 2001
- "Digital Love" (Digital Farm Animals song), 2017
- "Digital Love", a 1981 song by Amii Stewart
