= Carry Me On (disambiguation) =

"Carry Me On" is a 2013 song by Brookes Brothers.

Carry Me On may also refer to:

- "Carry Me On", a song by Arc Angels from the 1992 album Arc Angels
- "Carry Me On", an 1852 poem by Fanny Crosby
