= Just Got Paid (Sigala song) =

Single by Sigala, Ella Eyre and Meghan Trainor featuring French Montana

from the album Brighter Days
- Released: 7 September 2018
- Genre: Dance-pop; Funky House
- Length: 3:38
- Label: Ministry of Sound; B1
- Songwriters: Bruce Fielder; Ella McMahon; Steve Manovski; Karim Kharbouch; George Astasio; Jon Shave; Meghan Trainor; Nile Rodgers; Jason Pebworth
- Producers: Sigala; Steve Manovski; Joakim Jarl

Sigala singles chronology
"We Don't Care" (2018)	"Just Got Paid" (2018)	"Wish You Well" (2019)

Ella Eyre singles chronology
"Answerphone" (2018)	"Just Got Paid" (2018)	"Mama" (2019)

Meghan Trainor singles chronology
"Can't Dance" (2018)	"Just Got Paid" (2018)	"More than Friends" (2018)

French Montana singles chronology
"Creep On Me" (2018)	"Just Got Paid" (2018)	"No Stylist" (2018)

Music video
- "Just Got Paid" on YouTube

"Just Got Paid" is a song by English DJ and record producer Sigala, singer Ella Eyre, and American singer-songwriter Meghan Trainor from the former of the three's debut studio album, Brighter Days (2018). The song features a guest appearance by rapper French Montana. The performers co-wrote it with Steve Manovski, George Astasio, Jon Shave, Nile Rodgers, and Jason Pebworth, with production from Sigala, Manovski and Joakim Jarl. Ministry of Sound Recordings and B1 Recordings released it on 7 September 2018, as the tenth and final single from the album. The funk and electronic dance music song has a disco vibe, "poppy" vocals and its lyrics deal with living a luxurious lifestyle despite not being wealthy.

"Just Got Paid" received generally positive reviews from music critics. The song reached number 11 on the UK Singles Chart, number 7 on the Scottish Singles Chart and number 12 on the Irish Singles Chart. An accompanying music video was released on 10 October 2018, it features Trainor and Eyre quitting their jobs and performing a dance routine together. Sigala and Eyre performed the song several times for Capital, during the 2018 and 2019 Jingle Bell Ball as well as the 2019 Summertime Ball.

== Background and composition ==
Sigala and Ella Eyre shared the same manager, and released their first collaboration "Came Here for Love" on 9 June 2017. In 2018, Meghan Trainor's then-upcoming third major-label studio album Treat Myself (2020) had been delayed by her management who encouraged her to work on more collaborations, as she had few of them in the past. Sigala, Eyre and Trainor co-wrote "Just Got Paid" with Steve Manovski, French Montana, George Astasio, Jon Shave, Nile Rodgers and Jason Pebworth, with production being solely handled by Sigala, Manovski and Joakim Jarl. The song subsequently led toward Trainor developing the album's sound, with her hiring Sigala to co-write and produce its ninth track "Blink".

"Just Got Paid"
A 21-second sample of "Just Got Paid", where Ella Eyre's vocals were described as "poppy" and "impeccable".

"Just Got Paid" incorporates several music genres, including funk and electronic dance music along with a disco vibe. The song is composed of horns and riffs, with lyrics about payday that Radio.com's LA described as "fun-filled, youthful, and careless". Trainor and Eyre deliver "poppy" vocals over its production, which utilises the "ka-ching" sound effect made by a cash register. The song is about living a luxurious lifestyle in spite of not being wealthy, with Eyre's verse seeing her attempting to save money but then giving it and spending it, while Trainor chants about "work[ing] to the bone" and thus celebrating the payout.

== Release and promotion ==
Ministry of Sound and B1 Recordings released "Just Got Paid" for digital download and streaming as a collaboration between the trio, with a featured verse from French Montana, on 7 September 2018, as the tenth single from Sigala's debut studio album Brighter Days. The record labels serviced the song to contemporary hit radio in Australia on the same day and in the United Kingdom on 21 September, while Sony Music sent it to the radio format in Italy on 14 September. A Remix EP to promote the song was released on 30 November 2018, featuring remixes of the song by the Him, M-22 and Dean-E-G.

The music video for "Just Got Paid" was released on 10 October 2018. It commences with Eyre working at a laundromat where she starts a party. Trainor works a job at the counter of a grocery store, from which she departs as soon as receiving her paycheque. The two of them unite at a parking lot and perform a dance routine, while confetti falls from the sky. However, Montana does not appear in the video. Sigala and Eyre performed "Just Got Paid" for Capital FM numerous times, during the 2018 Jingle Bell Ball, and in 2019 at the Summertime Ball and Jingle Bell Ball, respectively.

== Reception ==
"Just Got Paid" was met with generally positive reviews from music critics. LA described the song as an "incredibly hot new vibe", noting that it includes "enough funk to make Bruno Mars and Mark Ronson do a double take", and added that Montana "[spat] the smoothest bars [...] with enough charisma to make your head bounce". The track was listed among its release week's top five songs to listen to by Raisa Bruner of Time, who dubbed it the "song you put at the top [of] your going-out-after-payday playlist" and declared it "hard not to get to toe-tapping" over the production. Idolator's Mike Nied wrote that Trainor and Eyre "steal the show with their impeccable vocals" on the "fiery bop", and further called it "infectious and carefree" as well as a "floor filler [that] sounds like a serious hit". Mike Wass of the same website labelled the song a "feel-good anthem". A writer for Capital FM wrote that "when you combine Sigala and Ella Eyre, you just get bangers" and cited "Just Got Paid" as an example. Billboard's Rania Aniftos called the song a "catchy tune", while The Guardian's Graeme Virtue called it a "triumphant" and "celebratory anti-austerity anthem that wears its daffy cash register 'ding' with pride".

"Just Got Paid" reached number 11 on the UK Singles Chart and was certified platinum by the British Phonographic Industry (BPI) in the country, and reached numbers 7 and 12 in Scotland and Ireland, respectively. Other top 100 peak positions for the song included number 21 on Hungary's Rádiós Top 40 chart, number 23 on Croatia's HRT chart, number 39 on Slovakia's Rádió Top 100 chart, as well as at numbers 44, 63 and 94 on the Polish Airplay Top 100, Romania's Airplay 100 and Czech Republic's Rádió Top 100 charts, respectively. It was additionally certified gold in Australia and Poland by the Australian Recording Industry Association (ARIA) and the Polish Society of the Phonographic Industry (ZPAV), respectively.

== Track listings ==
- Digital download / streaming
1. "Just Got Paid" – 3:38
- Remix EP
1. "Just Got Paid" (The Him Remix) – 3:12
2. "Just Got Paid" (M-22 Remix) – 3:43
3. "Just Got Paid" (Dean-E-G Remix) – 3:52

== Credits and personnel ==
Credits adapted from Tidal.

- Sigala – producer, background vocals, engineer, mastering engineer, mixing engineer, programmer
- Ella Eyre – lead vocals
- Meghan Trainor – lead vocals
- French Montana – featured vocals
- Joakim Jarl – producer
- Steve Manovski – producer, background vocals, drums
- Jerry Barnes – assistant producer, bass
- Nile Rodgers – guitar
- Emily McGregor – strings
- Adrian Veale – trumpet

== Charts ==
=== Weekly charts ===
Weekly chart positions for "Just Got Paid"
Chart (2018–2019)	Peak position
Belgium (Ultratip Bubbling Under Flanders)	40
Belgium (Ultratip Bubbling Under Wallonia)	11
Belgium Dance (Ultratop Flanders)	36
Croatia (HRT)	23
Czech Republic Airplay (ČNS IFPI)	94
Euro Digital Song Sales (Billboard)	14
Hungary (Rádiós Top 40)	21
Ireland (IRMA)	12
New Zealand Hot Singles (RMNZ)	19
Poland Airplay (ZPAV)	44
Romania (Airplay 100)	63
Scotland Singles (OCC)	7
Slovakia Airplay (ČNS IFPI)	39
Sweden Heatseeker (Sverigetopplistan)	5
UK Singles (OCC)	11
US Hot Dance/Electronic Songs (Billboard)	24

=== Year-end charts ===
Year-end chart positions for "Just Got Paid"
Chart (2019)	Position
Hungary (Rádiós Top 40)	66

== Certifications ==
Certifications for "Just Got Paid"
Region	Certification	Certified units/sales
Australia (ARIA)	Gold	35,000^{‡}
Brazil (Pro-Música Brasil)	Gold	20,000^{‡}
Canada (Music Canada)	Platinum	80,000^{‡}
New Zealand (RMNZ)	Platinum	30,000^{‡}
Poland (ZPAV)	Gold	10,000^{‡}
United Kingdom (BPI)	Platinum	600,000^{‡}
^{‡} Sales+streaming figures based on certification alone.

== Release history ==
Release dates and format(s) for "Just Got Paid"
Region	Date	Format(s)	Version	Label(s)	Ref.
Various	7 September 2018	Digital download; streaming	Original	Ministry of Sound; B1	
Australia	7 September 2018	Contemporary hit radio	Original	Ministry of Sound; B1	
Italy	14 September 2018	Contemporary hit radio	Original	Sony	
United Kingdom	21 September 2018	Contemporary hit radio	Original	Ministry of Sound; B1	
Various	30 November 2018	Digital download; streaming	Remixes	Ministry of Sound; B1	
