= Corentin Henri Le Fur =

Film score composer

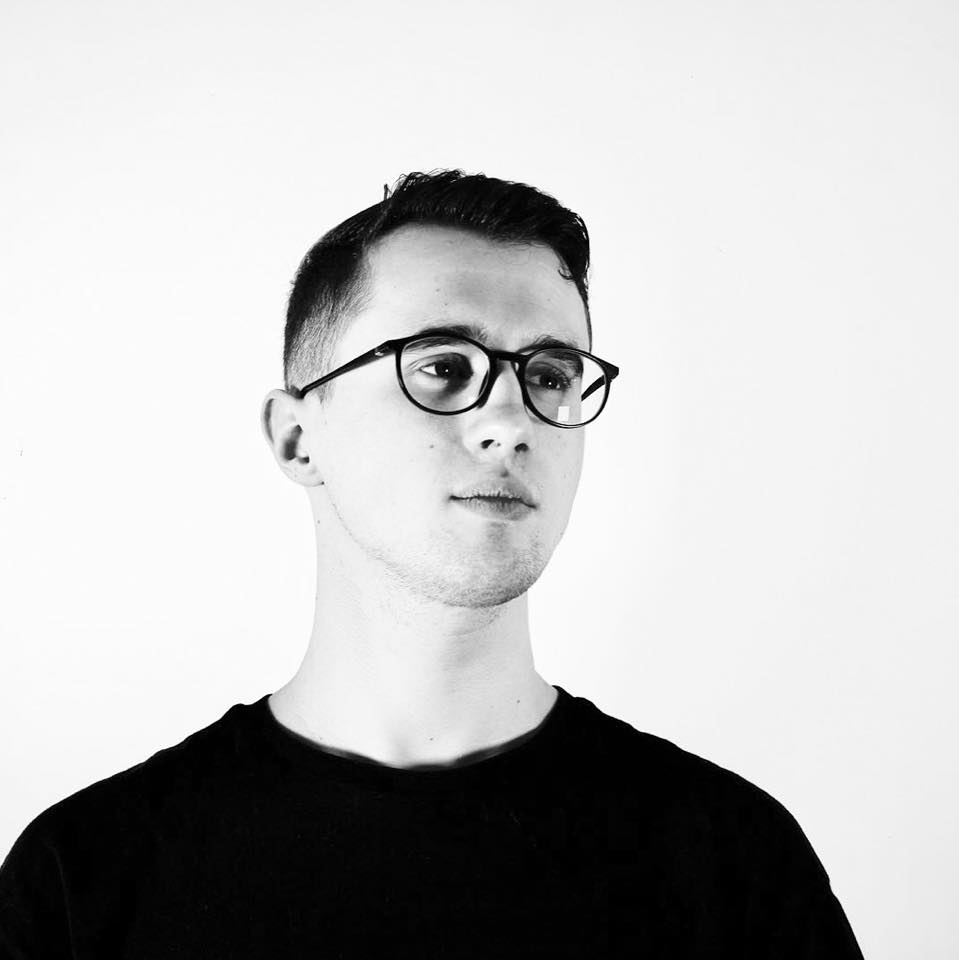

Background information
- Born: Beauvais, France
- Occupations: Composer, record producer
- Instruments: Piano, keyboards, synthesizer, guitar
- Years active: 2016-present
- Label: BMG Rights Management
- Website: lefurmusic.com

Corentin Henri Le Fur is a French film score composer and record producer from Beauvais, France, now based in London, United Kingdom. In 2016, Corentin joined the joint venture between British publishing company BMG Rights Management and DJ Fresh production team "The Fallen Angels", then later founded his own company.

== Career ==
In 2016, Le Fur took part in the writing and production of Digital Farm Animals's breakout single Digital Love as part of DJ Fresh‘s production team “The Fallen Angels”. The success of this single gave him the opportunity to later collaborate with international Artists from Diplo, Fatman Scoop and Kylie Minogue to Bad Company UK and TV Noise.

In 2017, Le Fur contributed to the production of Bad Company UK's Ice Station Zero Album, co-writing and co-producing "Ruckus", a tribute to Pendulum's record : Tarantula. Later this year, Le Fur started collaborating with the British DJ AFISHAL, helping with the development of the musical part of his Visual DJ project, allowing the DJ to control audio and video assets using a MIDI controller called Tremor.

In 2019, Le Fur's works were featured in Michael Bay’s Motion Picture 6 Underground, as well as Netflix's Next In Fashion. In the following months, he made his way through the music industry as a Film score Composer supplying, among others, compositions for the Video Game editor Epic Games. On the same year, Le Fur was nominated, and won a Mark Award as part of the Production Music Awards ceremony for his work "Venus Bass Trap", as Best Production Music Track in the Hip-Hop/R&B/Urban category.

In the following years, Le Fur continued composing music for the production music and synchronization licensing industry. His works have been featured in television series including Love Island, Owning Manhattan - for which he composed the closing credits - Love Is Blind, F1: The Academy, Project Runway, and Single's Inferno. His music has also been used in advertising campaigns for companies including Samsung, EasyJet, JD, KFC, Nando's, and eBay.

In 2025, Le Fur co-produced a live arrangement of Isolated System by the British rock band Muse alongside Dan Lancaster. The arrangement was performed during the band's 2025 festival tour and its 2026 United States tour.

== Discography ==
=== Albums ===
- 2018 : EDM With Attitude (in collaboration with DJ Fresh and Willem Vanderstichele)
- 2020 : Galvanised EDM (in collaboration with Andy Garcia)
- 2020 : Swagger Riffs
- 2021 : Hype Hop Hitters
- 2021 : Summer Bangers
- 2021 : Future Waves
- 2021 : Hype Hop Hitters vol. 2
- 2022 : Glitch Funk vol. 2
- 2022 : Rhythmic Intensity vol. 2
- 2022 : Boombox Brass Hop
- 2022 : Hot Summer
- 2023 : Rebellion
- 2023 : Hype Hop Hitters vol. 3
- 2024 : Swagger Riffs vol. 2
- 2024 : Escape The Jungle
- 2025 : Summer Hits vol. 2
- 2025 : Bouncing Off The Walls
- 2025 : Boombox Brass Hop vol. 2
- 2025 : Glitch Funk vol. 3
- 2025 : Summer Bangers Vol. 3
- 2025 : Goated

=== Credits ===
- 2017 : Digital Farm Animals & Hailee Steinfeld - Digital Love (writer, producer)
- 2017 : Bad Company UK - Ruckus (ft. MC $pyda) (writer, producer)
- 2018 : Afishal - Alliance (writer, producer)
- 2018 : Afishal - Attitude (writer, producer)
- 2019 : Afishal - Twerk It (writer, producer)
- 2020 : Afishal - Sax in Jamaica (writer, producer)
- 2021 : A.R.T - Sail Away (writer, producer)
- 2021 : A.R.T - In The Middle feat. Sam Bosman (writer, producer)
- 2024 : Dan Lancaster - Come Together (writer, producer)
- 2025 : Muse - Isolated System (Dan Lancaster Remix) (producer)
- 2026 : Florak x Devmo - Big Deal (writer, producer)
- 2026 : Florak x CuZZo - Clearly I'm Hot (writer, producer)
- 2026 : Florak x Anna Maze - Power Play (writer, producer)

== Awards and honors ==
- Mark Award as Best Production Music Track in the Hip-Hop/R&B/Urban - Production Music Awards 2019 for the work Venus Bass Trap
