= Tear You Down =

"Tear You Down" / "Drifter"

Single by Brookes Brothers

from the album Brookes Brothers
- A-side: "Tear You Down"
- B-side: "Drifter" (with Furlonge)
- Released: 31 October 2008 (physical); 3 November 2008 (digital)
- Recorded: 2008
- Genre: Drum and bass
- Length: 5:48 ("Tear You Down"); 5:11 ("Drifter"); 3:13 ("Tear You Down" radio edit)
- Label: Breakbeat Kaos
- Songwriter(s): Dan Brookes and Phil Brookes
- Producer(s): Dan Brookes, Phil Brookes, Furlonge

"Tear You Down" is a 2008 song by sibling production duo the Brookes Brothers. "Tear You Down" was first released as a double A-side single with the track "Drifter", which was co-produced by drum and bass musician and Viper Recordings artist Dominic Furlonge. The single charted at #56 on the UK Singles Chart and spent 2 weeks at no. 1 in the UK Dance Chart; it is one of the artists' most commercially successful singles to date.

"Tear You Down" features a vocal sample from the chorus of the song "If I Were Your Woman" by Gladys Knight & the Pips. The track was later featured in the Brookes Brothers' self-titled debut album in 2011.

== Chart performance ==
Chart (2008)	Peak; position
UK Dance (OCC)	1
UK Singles (OCC)	56
