= Feels like Home (Sigala song) =

Single by Sigala, Fuse ODG and Sean Paul featuring Kent Jones

from the album Brighter Days
- Released: 14 June 2018
- Genre: Tropical house
- Length: 3:39
- Label: Ministry of Sound; B1
- Songwriters: Bruce Fielder; Daryl Kent Jones; Janée Bennett; Nana Richard Abiona; Sean Paul Henriques
- Producer: Sigala

Sigala singles chronology
"Lullaby" (2018)	"Feels like Home" (2018)	"We Don't Care" (2018)

Fuse ODG singles chronology
"Do That" (2017)	"Feels like Home" (2018)	"Island" (2018)

Sean Paul singles chronology
"Tip Pon It" (2018)	"Feels like Home" (2018)	"Naked Truth" (2018)

Kent Jones singles chronology
"Merengue" (2018)	"Feels like Home" (2018)	"I Like It" (2019)

"Feels like Home" is a song by English DJ and record producer Sigala, English-Ghanaian Afrobeats recording artist Fuse ODG and Jamaican rapper Sean Paul, featuring guest vocals from American recording artist Kent Jones. It was written by Sigala, Jones, Fuse ODG, Paul and Janée Bennett, with the song's production handled by Sigala. It was released to digital retailers on 14 June 2018, through Ministry of Sound Recordings and B1 Recordings.

== Background ==
"Feels like Home" was first announced by Sigala on 13 June 2018, a day before its release. Sigala announced that it was the first single from the "#SummerOfSigala" campaign, previously launched by his album preview party of the same name in Ibiza.

== Credits and personnel ==
- Sean Paul – composition, lyrics, vocals, programming
- Fuse ODG – composition, lyrics, vocals
- Kent Jones – composition, lyrics, vocals
- Janée Bennett – composition, lyrics
- Kevin Grainger – mix engineering, master engineering
- Neil Walters – trumpet
- Dipesh Parmar – editing, programming
- Joakim Jarl – programming
- Hal Ritson – programming
- Steve Manovski – programming

== Charts ==
Chart performance for "Feels like Home"
Chart (2018)	Peak position
Ireland (IRMA)	52
Poland (Dance Top 50)	19
Scotland Singles (OCC)	62
Sweden Heatseeker (Sverigetopplistan)	4
UK Singles (OCC)	71
UK Dance (OCC)	11
