= Only One (Sigala song) =

2016 single by Sigala and Digital Farm Animals

Single by Sigala and Digital Farm Animals
- Released: 2 December 2016
- Recorded: 2016
- Genre: Dance; tropical house
- Length: 3:23
- Label: Ministry of Sound
- Songwriters: Bruce Fielder; Nicholas Gale; Andrew Bullimore

Sigala singles chronology
| "Ain't Giving Up" (2016) | "Only One" (2016) | "Show You Love" (2017) |

Digital Farm Animals singles chronology
| "Millionaire" (2016) | "Only One" (2016) | "Digital Love" (2017) |

"Only One" is a song by British DJs/producers Sigala and Digital Farm Animals. It was released as a digital download on 2 December 2016 via Ministry of Sound. The song was written by Bruce Fielder, Nicholas Gale and Andrew Bullimore.

== Music video ==
A music video to accompany the release of "Only Love" was first released onto YouTube on 23 December 2016 at a total length of three minutes and fifty-nine seconds.

== Track listing ==
Digital download
| No. | Title | Length |
|---|---|---|
| 1. | "Only One" (radio edit) | 3:22 |

Digital download - Remixes
| No. | Title | Length |
|---|---|---|
| 1. | "Only One" (Blonde vs Sigala Remix) | 5:36 |
| 2. | "Only One" (Brookes Brothers Remix) | 3:57 |
| 3. | "Only One" (Quintino Remix) | 4:24 |
| 4. | "Only One" (PBH vs Jack Shizzle Remix) | 4:36 |

== Charts ==
Chart performance for "Only One"
| Chart (2018) | Peak position |
|---|---|
| Ireland (IRMA) | 63 |
| Scotland (OCC) | 6 |
| Sweden (Sverigetopplistan) | 96 |
| UK Singles (OCC) | 53 |

== Certifications ==
Certifications for "Only One"
| Region | Certification | Certified units/sales |
|---|---|---|
| United Kingdom (BPI) | Silver | 200,000^{‡} |
^{‡} Sales+streaming figures based on certification alone.

== Release history ==
Release history and formats for "Only One"
| Region | Date | Format | Label |
|---|---|---|---|
| United Kingdom | 2 December 2016 | Digital download | Ministry of Sound |
