= Danny Wheeler =

- Born: Daniel Moyo
- Origin: England
- Occupations: Musician; songwriter
- Years active: 2004–present
- Website: w10records.com

Danny Wheeler is an international DJ and drum and bass producer from West London. Danny Wheeler's debut; "Ghost" / "Lost Highway", launched him and co-producer, Sub Focus, into the top five of the UK Dance Charts and top 20 of the UK Indie Charts. He was featured in the Guinness Book of Records as one of the DJs who broke the world record for the most DJs to consecutively mix one record, live on BBC Radio. Wheeler is also the owner of W10 Records.

Danny Wheeler changed his stage name to "Wheelup" in 2019.

== Discography as Danny Wheeler ==
- 2004 Sub Focus & Danny Wheeler – Ghost / Lost Highway
- 2005 Danny Wheeler & Brookes Brothers – Aura // Blue Light
- 2008 Danny Wheeler Feat. Blu James – 100 Times / Stargate
- 2009 Danny Wheeler Feat. Kathy Brown – Money / Airforce
- 2011 Danny Wheeler & Suitboys, The / Danny Wheeler & Steelo – Universal Language LP Sampler
- 2011 Danny Wheeler / Danny Wheeler & Steelo – Universal Language
- 2012 Makoto, Danny Wheeler, Velocity & Loz Contreras – HE:Jam 2
- 2012 Danny Wheeler – Cultura Futura
- 2016 Makoto & Danny Wheeler – Midnight Hour / Sunshine
- 2016 Danny Wheeler - Magnetise
- 2019 Danny Wheeler - Weekend Rush EP
- 2019 Danny Wheeler - Utopia EP

== Discography as WheelUP ==
- 2021 Good Love
- 2023 We Are The Magic
- 2025 Inner Light
