= We Don't Care (Sigala song) =

Single by Sigala and The Vamps

from the album Brighter Days
- Released: 27 July 2018
- Recorded: 2017
- Genre: Moombahton
- Length: 3:27
- Label: Ministry of Sound
- Songwriter(s): Bruce Fielder; Ella McMahon; Richard Boardman; Pablo Bowman; Aryan Nasr; Adam Knights; Saman Kadduri
- Producer(s): Sigala

Sigala singles chronology
"Feels Like Home" (2018)	"We Don't Care" (2018)	"Just Got Paid" (2018)

The Vamps singles chronology
"Just My Type" (2018)	"We Don't Care" (2018)	"Right Now" (2019)

"We Don't Care" is a song by British DJ Sigala and British pop rock band The Vamps. It was released as a digital download on 27 July 2018 via Ministry of Sound. The song was written by Sigala, Ella Eyre, Richard Boardman, Pablo Bowman, Aryan Nasr, Adam Knights and Saman Kadduri.

== Music video ==
A lyric video to accompany the release of "We Don't Care" was first released on YouTube on 26 July 2018.

== Charts ==
Chart (2018)	Peak position
Ireland (IRMA)	59
Scotland (OCC)	85

== Release history ==
Region	Date	Format	Label
United Kingdom	27 July 2017	Digital download	Ministry of Sound
