= Brighter Days (Sigala album) =

Studio album by Sigala
- Released: 28 September 2018
- Recorded: 2015–2018
- Genre: Dance
- Length: 56:22
- Label: Ministry of Sound; Columbia
- Producer: Sigala; Steve Manovski; Joakim Jarl; Shaun Frank; Klingande; White N3rd; Jerry Barnes; Cutfather; Alexander Healey; Joe Ashworth; Wez Clarke; Trevor Dahl; DJ Fresh; the Invisible Men; Hal Ritson

Sigala chronology
Brighter Days (2018)	Every Cloud – Silver Linings (2023)

Singles from Brighter Days
- 1. "Easy Love" Released: 4 September 2015; 2. "Sweet Lovin'" Released: 4 December 2015; 3. "Say You Do" Released: 18 March 2016; 4. "Give Me Your Love" Released: 29 April 2016; 5. "Ain't Giving Up" Released: 19 August 2016; 6. "Came Here for Love" Released: 9 June 2017; 7. "Lullaby" Released: 23 February 2018; 8. "Feels Like Home" Released: 14 June 2018; 9. "We Don't Care" Released: 27 July 2018; 10. "Just Got Paid" Released: 7 September 2018

Brighter Days is the debut studio album by British DJ and record producer Sigala. It was released through Ministry of Sound and Columbia Records on 28 September 2018. It includes his six UK top 10 singles, including the number-one hit "Easy Love".

== Singles ==
"Easy Love" was released as the album's lead single on 4 September 2015. The song reached number one in the United Kingdom and three in Ireland. "Sweet Lovin'" was released as the album's second single on 4 December 2015. Bryn Christopher is the guest artist. The song reached number three in the United Kingdom and number six in Ireland. "Say You Do" was released as the album's third single on 18 March 2016. Imani and DJ Fresh appear on the track. The song reached number five in the United Kingdom and number 27 in Ireland. "Give Me Your Love" was released as the album's fourth single on 29 April 2016. Listed guest artists are John Newman and Nile Rodgers. The song reached number nine in the United Kingdom and number 46 in Ireland. "Ain't Giving Up" was released as the album's fifth single on 19 August 2016. It is a collaboration with Craig David. The song reached number 23 in the United Kingdom and number 61 in Ireland.

"Came Here for Love" was released as the album's sixth single on 9 June 2017. It is a collaboration with Ella Eyre. The song reached number six in the United Kingdom and number nine in Ireland. "Lullaby" was released as the album's seventh single on 23 February 2018. It is a collaboration with Paloma Faith. The song reached number six in the United Kingdom and number eight in Ireland. "Feels Like Home" was released as the album's eighth single on 14 June 2018, with Sean Paul, Fuse ODG and Kent Jones. The song reached number 71 in the United Kingdom and number 52 in Ireland. "We Don't Care" was released as the album's ninth single on 27 July 2018. It is a collaboration with The Vamps. The song reached number 59 in Ireland. "Just Got Paid" was released as the album's tenth and final single on 7 September 2018. It is a collaboration with Ella Eyre and Meghan Trainor with French Montana. The single reached number 11 on the UK chart.

== Track listing ==
No.	Title	Writer(s)	Producer(s)	Length
1.	"Brighter Days" (with Paul of St. Paul & the Broken Bones)	Bruce Fielder; Paul Janeway; Ilsey Juber	Sigala; Steve Manovski; Joakim Jarl	4:00
2.	"Came Here for Love" (with Ella Eyre)	Fielder; Cedric Steinmyller; Scott Wild; Bryn Christopher; Ella McMahon	Sigala; Klingande; White N3rd	3:23
3.	"Feels Like Home" (with Sean Paul, Fuse ODG and Kent Jones)	Fielder; Sean Henriques; Nana Abiona; Janee Bennett; Daryl Kent Jones	Sigala	3:39
4.	"Just Got Paid" (with Ella Eyre, Meghan Trainor and French Montana)	Fielder; McMahon; Steven Manovski; Karim Kharbouch; George Astasio; Jonathan Shave; Meghan Trainor; Nile Rodgers; Jason Pebworth	Sigala; Manovski; Jarl; Jerry Barnes^{[b]}	3:40
5.	"We Don't Care" (with the Vamps)	Fielder; McMahon; Richard Boardman; Pablo Bowman; Aryan Nasr; Adam Knights; Saman Kadduri	Sigala	3:27
6.	"You Don't Know Me" (with Flo Rida, Shaun Frank and Delaney Jane)	Fielder; Shaun Frank; Mich Hansen; Daniel Heløy Davidsen; Peter Wallevik; Bennett; Dominic Mccallister; Tramar Dillard	Sigala; Frank; Cutfather; Alexander Healy	3:14
7.	"Somebody" (with HRVY and Nina Nesbitt)	Fielder; Zak Zilesnick; Skylar Adams; Daniel Shah; Lawrie Martin; Justus Nzeribe	Sigala; Manovski; Jarl	3:43
8.	"Lullaby" (with Paloma Faith)	Fielder; Jessica Glynne; Bennett; Andrew Bullimore; Paloma Faith; Joshua Record	Sigala; Joe Ashworth; Jarl	3:24
9.	"Ain't Giving Up" (with Craig David)	Fielder; Craig David	Sigala; Wez Clarke	2:37
10.	"What You Waiting For" (with Kylie Minogue)	Fielder; Gina Kushka; Pebworth; Astasio; Shave	Sigala	4:13
11.	"Sweet Lovin'" (with Bryn Christopher)	Fielder; Christopher	Sigala	3:22
12.	"Revival" (with Cheat Codes and Max)	Fielder; James Abrahart; Peter Rycroft; Trevor Dahl; Kevin Ford; Matthew Russell; Caroline Ailin; Maxwell Schneider	Sigala; Dahl; Jarl	3:11
13.	"Give Me Your Love" (with John Newman and Nile Rodgers)	Fielder; John Newman; Rodgers; Manovski	Sigala; Manovski	3:28
14.	"All for Love" (with Kodaline)	Fielder; James Newman; Steve Garrigan; Moon Willis	Sigala; Frank	3:55
15.	"Say You Do" (with Imani and DJ Fresh)	Fielder; Imani Williams; Daniel Stein; Penny Foster; Pebworth; Astasio; Shave; Mariah Carey; Jermaine Mauldin; Manuel Seal Jr.	Sigala; DJ Fresh; the Invisible Men	3:22
16.	"Easy Love"	Berry Gordy III; Frederick Perren; Alphonzo Mizell; Deke Richards	Sigala; Hal Ritson	3:47
Total length:				56:22

== Charts ==
=== Weekly charts ===
Weekly chart performance for Brighter Days
Chart (2018)	Peak position
Australian Albums (ARIA)	63
Belgian Albums (Ultratop Flanders)	102
Irish Albums (IRMA)	20
Scottish Albums (Official Charts)	26
UK Albums (Official Charts)	14
UK Dance Albums (Official Charts)	1

=== Year-end charts ===
Year-end chart performance for Brighter Days
Chart (2019)	Position
UK Albums (OCC)	85

== Certifications ==
Certifications for Brighter Days
Region	Certification	Certified units/sales
Canada (Music Canada)	Gold	40,000^{‡}
New Zealand (RMNZ)	Platinum	15,000^{‡}
Poland (ZPAV)	Gold	10,000^{‡}
United Kingdom (BPI)	Platinum	300,000^{‡}
^{‡} Sales+streaming figures based on certification alone.
