= Easy Love (Sigala song) =

Single by Sigala

from the album Brighter Days
- Released: 4 September 2015
- Genre: House; tropical house
- Length: 2:38 (radio edit); 3:50 (original mix); 5:44 (extended mix); 4:47 (re-edit)
- Label: Ministry of Sound
- Songwriters: Freddie Perren; Deke Richards; Alphonzo Mizell; Berry Gordy Jr
- Producers: Sigala; Hal Ritson

Sigala singles chronology
"Easy Love" (2015)	"Sweet Lovin'" (2015)

Music video
- "Easy Love" on YouTube

"Easy Love" is the debut single from British DJ and producer Sigala. It features an interpolation of the Jackson 5 song "ABC", re-produced by Hal Ritson and performed by Vula Malinga and Kyle Johnson. It was released on 4 September 2015 as a digital download in the United Kingdom through Ministry of Sound. The song debuted at number 71 on the UK Singles Chart based on streams alone and the following week, shot up 70 places up to peak at the top of both the UK Singles Chart and the UK Dance Chart. It also topped the UK Indie Chart.

== Music video ==
A music video to accompany the release of "Easy Love" was first released onto YouTube on 4 August 2015 at a total length of two minutes and fifty-seven seconds. The full song has a total length of three minutes and fifty seconds. Shot in Los Angeles, the video features the Canadian-Filipino dancing duo Lucky Aces, whose appearance on The Ellen DeGeneres Show caught the attention of the video's producer, who cast the act in the video.

Denise Pearson appeared as a guest vocalist on a performance of "Easy Love" for the New Year's Day edition of Top of the Pops in 2016.

== Track listing ==
Digital download – single
No.	Title	Length
1.	"Easy Love"	2:38

Digital download – EP
No.	Title	Length
1.	"Easy Love" (extended mix)	5:44
2.	"Easy Love" (re-edit)	4:47
3.	"Easy Love" (Sticky remix)	4:54
4.	"Easy Love" (DJ Zinc remix)	4:42

Remixes – EP
No.	Title	Length
1.	"Easy Love" (Faiir remix)	4:28
2.	"Easy Love" (Miguel Campell remix)	5:16
3.	"Easy Love" (Sticky Remix)	4:54
4.	"Easy Love" (DJ Zinc remix)	4:42
5.	"Easy Love" (Danny Byrd remix)	4:57

== Charts ==
=== Weekly charts ===
Chart (2015–18)	Peak position
Australia (ARIA)	14
Australia Dance (ARIA)	1
Austria (Ö3 Austria Top 40)	10
Belgium (Ultratop 50 Flanders)	3
Belgium (Ultratop 50 Wallonia)	13
Czech Republic Airplay (ČNS IFPI)	8
Czech Republic Singles Digital (ČNS IFPI)	13
Denmark (Tracklisten)	30
Ecuador (National-Report)	82
France (SNEP)	37
Germany (GfK)	5
Hungary (Dance Top 40)	22
Hungary (Rádiós Top 40)	22
Hungary (Single Top 40)	15
Hungary (Stream Top 40)	24
Ireland (IRMA)	3
Italy (FIMI)	50
Mexico Anglo (Monitor Latino)	6
Netherlands (Dutch Top 40)	2
Netherlands (Single Top 100)	2
New Zealand (RMNZ)	15
Norway (VG-lista)	18
Poland Airplay (ZPAV)	37
Poland Dance (ZPAV)	16
Scottish Singles Sales (Official Charts)	1
Slovakia Airplay (ČNS IFPI)	33
Slovakia Singles Digital (ČNS IFPI)	16
Slovenia (SloTop50)	25
Spain (Promusicae)	30
Sweden (Sverigetopplistan)	8
Switzerland (Schweizer Hitparade)	10
UK Singles (Official Charts)	1
UK Dance (Official Charts)	1
UK Indie (Official Charts)	1
US Hot Dance/Electronic Songs (Billboard)	16

=== Year-end charts ===
Chart (2015)	Position
Belgium (Ultratop Flanders)	77
Germany (Official German Charts)	62
Netherlands (Dutch Top 40)	28
Netherlands (Single Top 100)	56
Sweden (Sverigetopplistan)	83
Switzerland (Schweizer Hitparade)	68
UK Singles (Official Charts Company)	53
US Hot Dance/Electronic Songs (Billboard)	57
Chart (2016)	Position
Hungary (Dance Top 40)	82
US Hot Dance/Electronic Songs (Billboard)	92

== Certifications ==
Region	Certification	Certified units/sales
Australia (ARIA)	Platinum	70,000^{‡}
Belgium (BRMA)	Gold	10,000^{‡}
Canada (Music Canada)	Gold	40,000^{‡}
Denmark (IFPI Danmark)	Platinum	90,000^{‡}
Germany (BVMI)	Gold	200,000^{‡}
Italy (FIMI)	Gold	25,000^{‡}
New Zealand (RMNZ)	2× Platinum	60,000^{‡}
Norway (IFPI Norway)	Platinum	40,000^{‡}
Spain (Promusicae)	Gold	20,000^{‡}
Sweden (GLF)	2× Platinum	80,000^{‡}
United Kingdom (BPI)	2× Platinum	1,200,000^{‡}
^{‡} Sales+streaming figures based on certification alone.

== Release history ==
Region	Date	Format	Label
Ireland	4 September 2015	Digital download	Ministry of Sound
