= Carry Me On =

Single by Brookes Brothers featuring Chrom3
- Released: 4 August 2013
- Recorded: 2013
- Genre: Drum and bass
- Length: 3:33 (Radio Edit); 4:14 (Club Mix)
- Label: Viper Recordings
- Songwriter(s): Dan Brookes: Phil Brookes; Guy Buss; Tyrone Paul; Lloyd Perrin; Ian Tunstall
- Producer(s): Brookes Brothers

Carry Me On is the first single by Brookes Brothers from their second album, Orange Lane, released on Viper Recordings, the song featured vocal from Chrom3. It debuted on the UK Singles Chart at number 71 on 11 August 2013.

On 23 May 2013, the song was selected as Zane Lowe's Hottest Record in the World.

== Track listing ==
Digital download
No.	Title	Length
1.	"Carry Me On" (featuring Chrom3) (Radio Edit)	3:33
2.	"Carry Me On" (featuring Chrom3) (Club Mix)	4:14
3.	"Carry Me On" (featuring Chrom3) (Journeyman Remix)	5:45
4.	"Carry Me On" (featuring Chrom3) (Rusher Returns Remix)	4:16

== Chart performance ==
=== Weekly charts ===
Chart (2013)	Peak position
UK Indie (OCC)	7
UK Indie Breakers (Official Charts Company)	2
UK Singles (OCC)	71
