= Don't Mind (Kent Jones song) =

2016 single by Kent Jones

Single by Kent Jones

from the album Tours
- Released: April 25, 2016
- Genre: Hip-hop
- Length: 3:18
- Label: Epidemic; We the Best; Epic
- Songwriters: Daryl Jones; Marcello Valenzano; Andre Lyon; DJ Khaled; Barry White; Edwin Nicholas; Gerald Levert
- Producers: Jones; Khaled; Cool & Dre

Kent Jones singles chronology
"Don't Mind" (2016)	"Alright" (2016)

Music video
- "Don't Mind" on YouTube

"Don't Mind" is the debut single by American rapper Kent Jones. The song was released on April 25, 2016, by Epidemic Records, We the Best Music Group and Epic Records as a single from his debut mixtape Tours (2015). The official remix features Pitbull and Lil Wayne.

== Background and composition ==
"Don't Mind" was written by Jones, Marcello Valenzano, Andre Lyon, DJ Khaled, Barry White, Ramel Werner, Gerald Levert and Edwin Nicholas. The song was produced by Jones, Cool & Dre and Khaled. The song contains resung and replayed elements ("Telling me this..." in the chorus) of White's 1994 song "Practice What You Preach". In an interview with Billboard, Jones said, "I've always been inspired by Motown and soul. I'm a huge Barry White fan, so I had to pay homage. I wasn't like, "This is the one!"—I freestyled the whole thing. It's probably my 400th record. I've got a lot of music."

The song was composed and recorded in twelve hours. "I made the beat; the hook was in my head; the day I recorded the whole thing -- I didn’t even write it," Jones said." The song itself was inspired by the multiculturalism of Jones' home city of Miami. As he told the BBC, "It's a melting pot - Spanish, Haitian, French, Asian. And in that melting pot, I stuck with the greetings that were most comfortable to me. You hear a lot of people say 'hola'. Spanish is a language that happens to take a waltz in other people's back yards."

== Remix ==
An official remix of the song features rappers Pitbull and Lil Wayne and was released on July 12, 2016.

== Music video ==
The song's accompanying music video premiered on March 10, 2016, on Kent Jones' YouTube account. It features an appearance from DJ Khaled.

== Commercial performance ==
"Don't Mind" debuted at number 63 on Billboard Hot 100 for the chart dated May 21, 2016. It peaked at number 8 on the chart dating July 16, 2016. The song was certified Platinum by the Recording Industry Association of America (RIAA) for selling over 1,000,000 digital copies in the United States.

== Charts ==
=== Weekly charts ===
Chart (2016)	Peak position
Australia (ARIA)	19
Austria (Ö3 Austria Top 40)	52
Belgium (Ultratop 50 Flanders)	20
Belgium (Ultratop 50 Wallonia)	15
Canada Hot 100 (Billboard)	14
Czech Republic Singles Digital (ČNS IFPI)	40
Denmark (Tracklisten)	25
Euro Digital Songs (Billboard)	14
France (SNEP)	35
France Airplay (SNEP)	8
Germany (GfK)	36
Ireland (IRMA)	18
Italy (FIMI)	44
Mexico Airplay (Billboard)	31
Netherlands (Dutch Top 40)	17
Netherlands (Single Top 100)	25
New Zealand (Recorded Music NZ)	20
Norway (VG-lista)	33
Poland (Polish Airplay Top 100)	57
Portugal (AFP)	20
Scotland Singles (OCC)	17
Slovakia Singles Digital (ČNS IFPI)	40
Sweden (Sverigetopplistan)	38
Switzerland (Schweizer Hitparade)	46
UK Hip Hop/R&B (OCC)	3
UK Singles (OCC)	9
US Billboard Hot 100	8
US Dance/Mix Show Airplay (Billboard)	19
US Hot R&B/Hip-Hop Songs (Billboard)	3
US Hot Rap Songs (Billboard)	1
US Pop Airplay (Billboard)	8
US Rhythmic Airplay (Billboard)	1

=== Year-end charts ===
Chart (2016)	Position
Australia Urban (ARIA)	11
Belgium (Ultratop Flanders)	95
Belgium (Ultratop Wallonia)	98
Canada (Canadian Hot 100)	63
Denmark (Tracklisten)	79
France (SNEP)	68
Netherlands (Dutch Top 40)	93
Netherlands (Single Top 100)	77
UK Singles (Official Charts Company)	54
US Billboard Hot 100	48
US Hot R&B/Hip-Hop Songs (Billboard)	13
US Rhythmic (Billboard)	9

== Certifications ==
Region	Certification	Certified units/sales
Australia (ARIA)	Platinum	70,000^{‡}
Belgium (BRMA)	Gold	10,000^{‡}
Canada (Music Canada)	2× Platinum	160,000^{‡}
Denmark (IFPI Danmark)	Platinum	90,000^{‡}
Germany (BVMI)	Gold	200,000^{‡}
Italy (FIMI)	Gold	25,000^{‡}
Mexico (AMPROFON)	Gold	30,000^{‡}
New Zealand (RMNZ)	Platinum	30,000^{‡}
Poland (ZPAV)	Gold	10,000^{‡}
Sweden (GLF)	Platinum	40,000^{‡}
Switzerland (IFPI Switzerland)	Gold	15,000^{‡}
United Kingdom (BPI)	Platinum	600,000^{‡}
United States (RIAA)	2× Platinum	2,000,000^{‡}
^{‡} Sales+streaming figures based on certification alone.
