= Digital Love (Digital Farm Animals song) =

Single by Digital Farm Animals featuring Hailee Steinfeld
- Released: 3 February 2017
- Recorded: January 2017
- Genre: Tropical house
- Length: 3:00
- Label: Tim & Danny
- Songwriters: Nicholas Gale; Willem van Hanegem; Daniel Davidsen; James Newman; Mich Hansen; Daniel Stein; Peter Wallevik; Ward van der Harst
- Producers: Digital Farm Animals; W&W; CUTFATHER; Corentin Henri Le Fur (co.); Davidsen (co.); Wallevik (co.)

Digital Farm Animals singles chronology
"Only One" (2016)	"Digital Love" (2017)	"Back to You" (2017)

Hailee Steinfeld singles chronology
"Starving" (2016)	"Digital Love" (2017)	"Show You Love" (2017)

"Digital Love" is a single by British DJ and record producer Digital Farm Animals, featuring vocals from American singer Hailee Steinfeld. It was released on 3 February 2017, through Tim & Danny Music.

== Charts ==
Chart (2017)	Peak position
Scotland Singles (OCC)	56
UK Dance (OCC)	33
