= Lullaby (Sigala and Paloma Faith song) =

Single by Sigala and Paloma Faith

from the album Brighter Days
- Released: 23 February 2018
- Genre: Tropical house; dance-pop
- Length: 3:24
- Label: Ministry of Sound; B1
- Songwriters: Bruce Fielder; Jessica Glynne; Janée Bennett; Andrew Bullimore; Paloma Faith; Joshua Record; Joakim Jarl
- Producers: Joe Ashworth; Sigala; Jarly

Sigala singles chronology
"Came Here for Love" (2017)	"Lullaby" (2018)	"Feels Like Home" (2018)

Paloma Faith singles chronology
"'Til I'm Done" (2018)	"Lullaby" (2018)	"Make Your Own Kind of Music" (2018)

Music video
- "Lullaby" on YouTube

"Lullaby" is a song by English DJ and record producer Sigala and English singer-songwriter Paloma Faith. It was written by Sigala, Faith, Jess Glynne, Jin Jin, Josh Record, Andrew Bullimore and Joakim Jarl with the song's production handled by Sigala, Joe Ashworth and Jarly. It was released to digital retailers on 23 February 2018, through Ministry of Sound Recordings and B1 Recordings. "Lullaby" is included on the Zeitgeist Edition of Faith's fourth studio album, The Architect. On 12 January 2019, "Lullaby" was nominated for Best British Single at the Brit Awards.

== Background ==
"Lullaby" was first announced by Sigala on 22 February 2018, it is Faith's second dance collaboration after "Changing" with Sigma in 2014. Talking about the song, Sigala said: "'Lullaby' is about always going back to that person who has stuck with you through all the highs and the lows. Ultimately it is a song about love, but I have managed to keep that word out of the title this time! I love finding unique voices, and Paloma's is perfect for this track. I can't wait for you all to hear it!"

== Credits and personnel ==
- Sigala – composition, production
- Paloma Faith – composition, vocals
- Andrew Bullimore – composition, background vocals
- Josh Record – composition, background vocals
- Jess Glynne – composition
- Jin Jin – composition
- Joe Ashworth – production
- Joakim Jarl – composition, production
- Kevin Grainger – mix engineering, master engineering
- Lauren Flynn – background vocals
- Kirsten Joy – background vocals
- Janelle Martin-Cousins – background vocals
- Nym – background vocals
- Dipesh Parmar – editing, programming
- Mark Ralph – vocal production

== Charts ==
=== Weekly charts ===
Weekly chart performance
Chart (2018)	Peak position
Belgium (Ultratip Bubbling Under Flanders)	27
Belgium Dance (Ultratop Flanders)	5
Belgium (Ultratip Bubbling Under Wallonia)	13
Belgium Dance (Ultratop Wallonia)	9
Croatia (HRT)	16
Czech Republic Airplay (ČNS IFPI)	15
Czech Republic Singles Digital (ČNS IFPI)	73
Germany (GfK)	90
Hungary (Rádiós Top 40)	3
Ireland (IRMA)	8
Netherlands (Dutch Top 40)	33
Netherlands (Single Top 100)	32
New Zealand Heatseekers (RMNZ)	9
Poland Airplay (ZPAV)	2
Scottish Singles Sales (Official Charts)	3
Slovakia Airplay (ČNS IFPI)	61
Slovenia (SloTop50)	40
South Korea International (Gaon Digital Chart)	60
Sweden Heatseeker (Sverigetopplistan)	3
Switzerland (Schweizer Hitparade)	52
UK Singles (Official Charts)	6
UK Dance (Official Charts)	1
US Hot Dance/Electronic Songs (Billboard)	26

=== Year-end charts ===
Year-end chart performance
Chart (2018)	Position
Hungary (Rádiós Top 40)	24
Iceland (Plötutíóindi)	93
Ireland (IRMA)	23
Netherlands Airplay (Airplay Top 40)	91
Poland (ZPAV)	18
UK Singles (Official Charts Company)	27
US Hot Dance/Electronic Songs (Billboard)	74

== Certifications ==
Certifications for "Lullaby"
Region	Certification	Certified units/sales
Austria (IFPI Austria)	Gold	15,000^{‡}
Canada (Music Canada)	Platinum	80,000^{‡}
Italy (FIMI)	Gold	25,000^{‡}
New Zealand (RMNZ)	Gold	15,000^{‡}
Poland (ZPAV)	Platinum	20,000^{‡}
United Kingdom (BPI)	2× Platinum	1,200,000^{‡}
^{‡} Sales+streaming figures based on certification alone.
