= Came Here for Love =

2017 single by Sigala and Ella Eyre

Single by Sigala and Ella Eyre

from the album Brighter Days
- Released: 9 June 2017
- Recorded: 2017
- Genre: Tropical house
- Length: 3:22
- Label: Ministry of Sound; B1
- Songwriters: Bruce Fielder; Ella McMahon; Cédric Steinmyller; Bryn Christopher; Scott Wild
- Producers: Sigala; Klingande; White N3rd; Joakim Jarl

Sigala singles chronology
| "Show You Love" (2017) | "Came Here for Love" (2017) | "Lullaby" (2018) |

Ella Eyre singles chronology
| "Swing Low, Sweet Chariot" (2015) | "Came Here for Love" (2017) | "Ego" (2017) |

Music video
- "Came Here for Love" on YouTube

"Came Here for Love" is a song by English DJ and record producer Sigala and English singer-songwriter Ella Eyre. It was written by Klingande, Bryn Christopher and Scott Wild, with the song's production handled by Sigala, Klingande, White N3rd and Joakim Jarl. It was released to digital retailers on 9 June 2017, through Ministry of Sound Group and B1 Recordings.

== Background ==
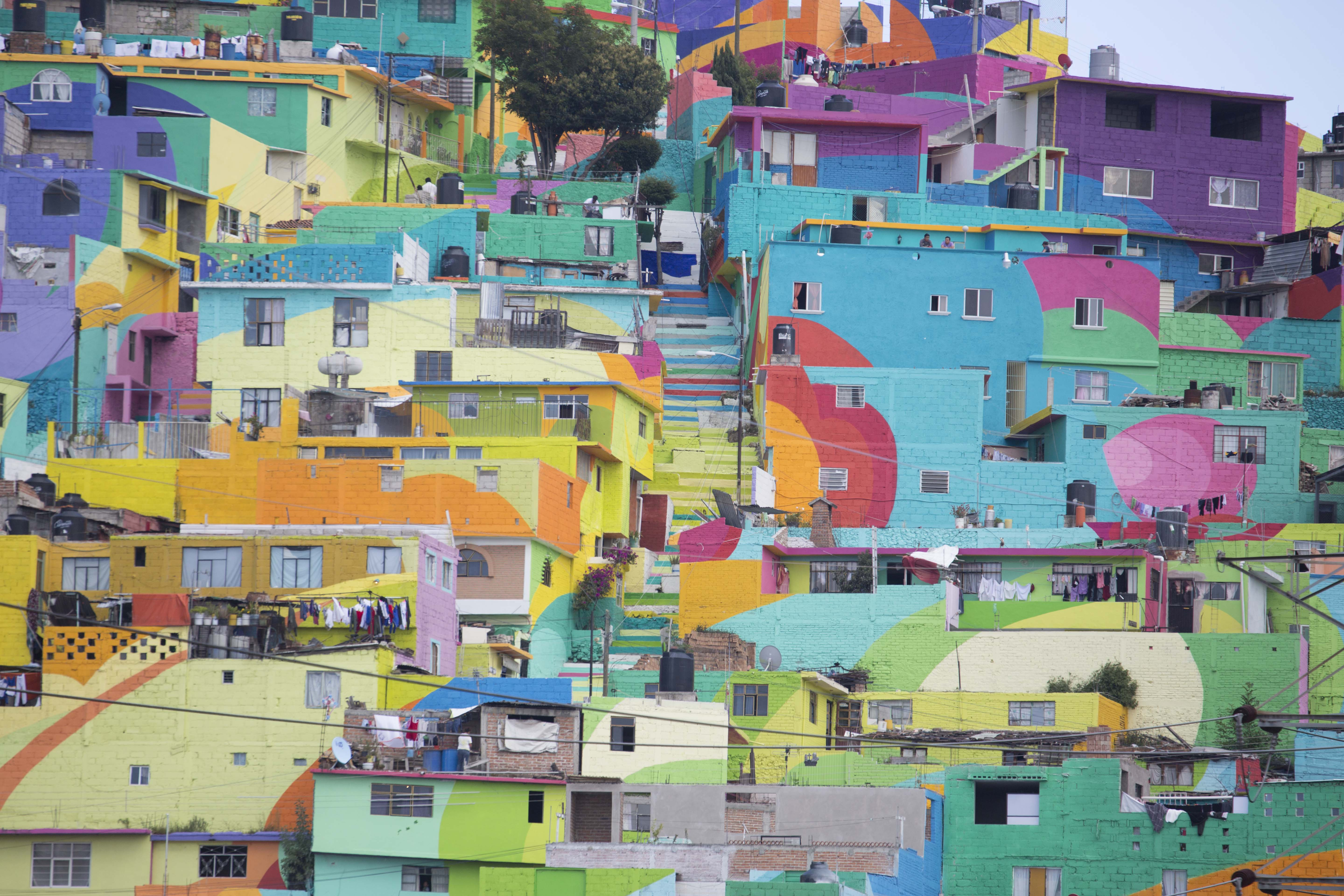
Las Palmitas neighbourhood in Pachuca, Mexico where the video was filmed

In an interview with Official Charts Company, Sigala said: "I'm really, really excited about it. The last few releases feel like they've been more collaborative – Craig David, Digital Farm Animals and the Hailee Steinfeld/Kato song – but this one feels more like my record, if you know what I mean. I'm so happy it's coming out – hopefully it'll be the first of many this year." When asked about how the collaboration came together, he said: "It was written with Bryn Christopher originally, who sang Sweet Lovin'. He'd pretty much written all the vocals and came to me with the idea for the song. We developed it from there and thought about getting Ella on it – we share the same manager. She helped us finish the song. The difficult thing with Bryn is he comes in with that crazy voice of his, so it's about finding someone to match that. Ella's one of the few people who can do that." In an interview with The List, he said: "We had planned to do a collaboration somewhere along the line, but we were just waiting for the right time and the right song."

When asked about the best bit of this song, he said: "The hands in the air moment is probably the 'came here for love' lyric. It's not the drop, but it's the building up to it moment. It's got the pianos and Ella's amazing vocals. It's the bit that puts a smile on my face anyway!"

== Track listing ==
Digital download
| No. | Title | Length |
|---|---|---|
| 1. | "Came Here for Love" | 3:22 |

Digital download – Acoustic
| No. | Title | Length |
|---|---|---|
| 1. | "Came Here for Love" (Acoustic) | 3:36 |

Digital download – Remix EP
| No. | Title | Length |
|---|---|---|
| 1. | "Came Here for Love" (Re-Edit) | 4:05 |
| 2. | "Came Here for Love" (Freedo Remix) | 3:23 |
| 3. | "Came Here for Love" (GotSome Remix) | 4:37 |
| 4. | "Came Here for Love" (Calvo Remix) | 4:25 |

== Credits and personnel ==
Credits adapted from Tidal.

- Sigala – composer, lyricist, producer, engineer
- Ella Eyre – composer, lyricist, vocalist
- Klingande – composer, lyricist, producer
- Bryn Christopher – composer, lyricist, background vocalist
- Scott Wild – composer, lyricist
- White N3rd – producer
- Kevin Grainger – mixing engineer, mastering engineer
- Bryan Corbett – trumpeter
- Fabio D'Andrea – bassist
- Dipesh Parmar – programmer, arranger
- Jim Hunt – saxophonist
- SNFNK – strings player
- Hal Ritson – violinist
- Alice Cooper-Hall – violinist
- Joe Rodwell – violinist

== Charts ==
=== Weekly charts ===
| Chart (2017–18) | Peak position |
|---|---|
| Australia (ARIA) | 53 |
| Austria (Ö3 Austria Top 40) | 56 |
| Belgium (Ultratip Bubbling Under Flanders) | 1 |
| Belgium (Ultratip Bubbling Under Wallonia) | 18 |
| Czech Republic Airplay (ČNS IFPI) | 16 |
| Czech Republic Singles Digital (ČNS IFPI) | 30 |
| Germany (GfK) | 76 |
| Hungary (Rádiós Top 40) | 6 |
| Ireland (IRMA) | 9 |
| Latvia (Latvijas Top 40) | 27 |
| Netherlands (Dutch Top 40) | 28 |
| Netherlands (Single Top 100) | 58 |
| Poland Airplay (ZPAV) | 4 |
| Romania (Airplay 100) | 88 |
| Scotland Singles (Official Charts) | 2 |
| Slovakia Airplay (ČNS IFPI) | 48 |
| Slovakia Singles Digital (ČNS IFPI) | 38 |
| Sweden (Sverigetopplistan) | 66 |
| Switzerland (Schweizer Hitparade) | 49 |
| UK Singles (Official Charts) | 6 |
| UK Dance (Official Charts) | 3 |
| US Hot Dance/Electronic Songs (Billboard) | 32 |

=== Year-end charts ===
| Chart (2017) | Position |
|---|---|
| Poland (ZPAV) | 54 |
| UK Singles (Official Charts Company) | 48 |
| US Hot Dance/Electronic Songs (Billboard) | 86 |
| Chart (2018) | Position |
| Hungary (Rádiós Top 40) | 45 |

== Certifications ==
| Region | Certification | Certified units/sales |
|---|---|---|
| Australia (ARIA) | Gold | 35,000^{‡} |
| Austria (IFPI Austria) | Gold | 15,000^{‡} |
| Canada (Music Canada) | Platinum | 80,000^{‡} |
| Denmark (IFPI Danmark) | Gold | 45,000^{‡} |
| Germany (BVMI) | Gold | 200,000^{‡} |
| Italy (FIMI) | Gold | 25,000^{‡} |
| Mexico (AMPROFON) | Gold | 30,000^{‡} |
| New Zealand (RMNZ) | Platinum | 30,000^{‡} |
| Poland (ZPAV) | Platinum | 20,000^{‡} |
| Switzerland (IFPI Switzerland) | Gold | 10,000^{‡} |
| United Kingdom (BPI) | 3× Platinum | 1,800,000^{‡} |
Streaming
| Sweden (GLF) | Gold | 4,000,000^{†} |
^{‡} Sales+streaming figures based on certification alone.^{†} Streaming-only figures based on certification alone.

== Release history ==
| Region | Date | Format | Version | Label | Ref. |
|---|---|---|---|---|---|
| Various | 9 June 2017 | Digital download | Original | Ministry of Sound; B1 | |
| Various | 28 July 2017 | Digital download | Acoustic | Ministry of Sound; B1 | |
