= Show You Love (Kato song) =

Single by Kato and Sigala featuring Hailee Steinfeld
- Released: 24 February 2017
- Recorded: 2016–17
- Genre: House
- Length: 3:02
- Label: Virgin EMI; Universal
- Songwriters: Thomas Kato Vittrup; Bruce Fielder; Grace Tither
- Producers: Kato; Sigala

Kato singles chronology
"Live It Up" (2016)	"Show You Love" (2017)	"Motions" (2018)

Sigala singles chronology
"Only One" (2016)	"Show You Love" (2017)	"Came Here for Love" (2017)

Hailee Steinfeld singles chronology
"Digital Love" (2017)	"Show You Love" (2017)	"At My Best" (2017)

"Show You Love" is a song by Danish DJ Kato and British DJ Sigala featuring the vocals of American singer Hailee Steinfeld. The song is a re-release of the 2015 single with vocals by Grace Tither instead of Steinfeld.

== Charts ==
Chart performance for "Show You Love"
Chart (2017)	Peak position
Ireland (IRMA)	86
Scotland (OCC)	38
UK Singles (OCC)	91

== Certifications ==
Certifications for "Show You Love"
Region	Certification	Certified units/sales
Denmark (IFPI Danmark)	Gold	45,000^{‡}
United Kingdom (BPI)	Silver	200,000^{‡}
^{‡} Sales+streaming figures based on certification alone.
