= Say You Do (Sigala song) =

2016 single by Sigala

Single by Sigala featuring Imani and DJ Fresh

from the album Brighter Days
- Released: 18 March 2016
- Genre: Tropical house; drum and bass
- Length: 3:22
- Label: Ministry of Sound
- Songwriters: Sigala; Imani; DJ Fresh; Penny Foster; Jason Pebworth; George Astasio; Jon Shave; Mariah Carey; Jermaine Dupri; Manuel Seal
- Producers: Sigala; DJ Fresh; The Invisible Men

Sigala singles chronology
| "Sweet Lovin'" (2015) | "Say You Do" (2016) | "Give Me Your Love" (2016) |

DJ Fresh singles chronology
| "How Love Begins" (2016) | "Say You Do" (2016) | "Bang Bang" (2016) |

"Say You Do" is the third single by British tropical house DJ Sigala. It features British singer Imani Williams and British drum and bass DJ/producer DJ Fresh. It was released on 18 March 2016 as a digital download in the United Kingdom through Ministry of Sound. It is the follow-up to his previous single "Sweet Lovin'". The track interpolates a hook from Mariah Carey's "Always Be My Baby". Say You Do has been featured as the intro song of Love Island USA 2026.

== Music video ==
A music video to accompany the release of "Say You Do" was first released onto YouTube on 5 February 2016 at a total length of three minutes and thirty-one seconds. Imani appears throughout the whole video, while Sigala and DJ Fresh don't. The video was filmed at Port Antonio, Jamaica.

== Charts ==
=== Charts ===
Weekly chart performance for "Say You Do"
| Chart (2016) | Peak position |
|---|---|
| Belgium (Ultratop 50 Flanders) | 40 |
| Ireland (IRMA) | 27 |
| Poland Airplay (ZPAV) | 76 |
| Scotland Singles (OCC) | 2 |
| Sweden (Sverigetopplistan) | 76 |
| UK Dance (OCC) | 1 |
| UK Indie (OCC) | 1 |
| UK Singles (OCC) | 5 |

=== Year-end charts ===
Year-end chart performance for "Say You Do"
| Chart (2016) | Position |
|---|---|
| UK Singles (Official Charts Company) | 76 |

== Certifications ==
Certifications for "Say You Do"
| Region | Certification | Certified units/sales |
|---|---|---|
| New Zealand (RMNZ) | Gold | 15,000^{‡} |
| Sweden (GLF) | Gold | 20,000^{‡} |
| United Kingdom (BPI) | Platinum | 600,000^{‡} |
^{‡} Sales+streaming figures based on certification alone.

== Release history ==
Release history and formats for "Say You Do"
| Region | Date | Format | Label |
|---|---|---|---|
| United Kingdom | 18 March 2016 | Digital download; streaming | Ministry of Sound |
