= Give Me Your Love (Sigala song) =

Single by Sigala featuring John Newman and Nile Rodgers

from the album Brighter Days
- Released: 29 April 2016
- Recorded: 2015
- Genre: Dance-pop; funky house; post-disco; tropical house
- Length: 3:30
- Label: Ministry of Sound
- Songwriters: Bruce Fielder; John Newman; Steve Manovski
- Producers: Sigala; Manovski

Sigala singles chronology
"Say You Do" (2016)	"Give Me Your Love" (2016)	"Don't Need No Money" (2016)

John Newman singles chronology
"Tiring Game" (2015)	"Give Me Your Love" (2016)	"Olé" (2016)

Nile Rodgers singles chronology
"Kill the Lights" (2016)	"Give Me Your Love" (2016)	"Telepathy" (2016)

"Give Me Your Love" is the fourth single produced by British DJ and record producer Sigala. It features the vocals from British singer John Newman and partial production work from American electric guitarist Nile Rodgers and was released on 29 April 2016 by Ministry of Sound.

Rodgers plays guitar throughout most of the song. According to the BBC Four documentary How to Make It in the Music Business, there was one part of the chorus where Newman switched Rodgers' guitar playing for his own, and only got caught when he was playing guitar during playback of the video, and discovered he could not quite play the chorus correctly.

== Music video ==
A music video to accompany the release of "Give Me Your Love" was released on YouTube on 29 April 2016.

== Charts ==
=== Weekly charts ===
Weekly chart performance for "Give Me Your Love"
Chart (2016)	Peak position
Australia (ARIA)	83
Austria (Ö3 Austria Top 40)	50
Belgium (Ultratip Bubbling Under Flanders)	1
Czech Republic Airplay (ČNS IFPI)	9
Czech Republic Singles Digital (ČNS IFPI)	74
France (SNEP)	200
Germany (GfK)	55
Hungary (Dance Top 40)	40
Hungary (Rádiós Top 40)	5
Hungary (Single Top 40)	18
Ireland (IRMA)	46
Poland Airplay (ZPAV)	23
Scottish Singles Sales (Official Charts)	1
Slovakia Airplay (ČNS IFPI)	27
Slovakia Singles Digital (ČNS IFPI)	87
Sweden Heatseeker (Sverigetopplistan)	5
UK Dance (Official Charts)	4
UK Indie (Official Charts)	1
UK Singles (Official Charts)	9
US Hot Dance/Electronic Songs (Billboard)	44

=== Year-end charts ===
Year-end chart performance for "Give Me Your Love"
Chart (2016)	Position
Hungary (Rádiós Top 40)	63

== Certifications ==
Certifications for "Give Me Your Love"
Region	Certification	Certified units/sales
Canada (Music Canada)	Gold	40,000^{‡}
Italy (FIMI)	Gold	25,000^{‡}
Mexico (AMPROFON)	Platinum	60,000^{‡}
New Zealand (RMNZ)	Gold	15,000^{‡}
Poland (ZPAV)	Gold	10,000^{‡}
United Kingdom (BPI)	Platinum	600,000^{‡}
^{‡} Sales+streaming figures based on certification alone.

== Release history ==
Release history and formats for "Give Me Your Love"
Region	Date	Format	Label
United Kingdom	29 April 2016	Digital download; streaming	Ministry of Sound
