= Kent Jones (rapper) =

American rapper (born 1993)

- Born: Daryl Kent Jones; April 14, 1993 (age 33); Tallahassee, Florida, U.S.
- Genres: Pop rap; R&B
- Occupations: Rapper; singer; songwriter; record producer
- Years active: 2013–present
- Labels: Epidemic; We the Best; Epic
- Producer(s): Cool & Dre; DJ Khaled

Daryl Kent Jones (born April 14, 1993) is an American rapper, singer-songwriter, and record producer. He is best known for his 2016 debut single "Don't Mind", which peaked at number eight on the US Billboard Hot 100.

Jones signed with Cool & Dre's Epidemic Records in 2014, and DJ Khaled's We the Best Music Group, an then-imprint of Epic Records later that same year. His debut mixtape, Tours (2015), contained "Don't Mind", which became a sleeper hit the following year.

== Early life ==
Daryl Kent Jones was born on April 14, 1993, in Tallahassee, Florida. As a youngster, he came in contact with music in his local church, while he was also taught to play the drums by his aunt. Later on, Jones started taking formal music lessons, learning to play the piano and the Hammond organ, and studying music theory. He also started developing an interest in jazz music, appreciating the music of Quincy Jones. Jones later moved to Miami to further work with Cool & Dre.

== Career ==
Jones signed a record contract with Cool & Dre's label Epidemic Records in 2015. While at Epidemic, he produced, co-wrote, and guest appeared on releases for Fat Joe, The Game, Currensy, Queen Latifah, and Busta Rhymes. In 2015, Cool & Dre then introduced Jones to DJ Khaled, who signed him in a joint venture with the latter's We the Best Music Group, a then-imprint of Epic Records.

Jones released his first mixtape, Tours, in July 2015. The mixtape spawned the single "Don't Mind", which contains lyrics in French, Spanish, Japanese, and Haitian Creole, and was released as a single by the aforementioned labels in April 2016. "Don't Mind", originally meant to be omitted from the mixtape, was also remixed by fellow Miami-based rapper Trina. The song debuted at number 63 on the Billboard Hot 100 chart in May 2016, reached number 46 on pop radio in the first week of May 2016, further rising to number 40 in the following weeks.

Also in July 2015, Jones was featured on the soundtrack of NBA 2K16, appearing on label boss DJ Khaled's track "365" along with labelmates Ace Hood and Vado.

== Discography ==
=== Mixtapes ===
List of mixtapes, with selected details
Title	Album details
Tours	Released: July 27, 2015; Label: Epidemic, We the Best, Epic; Format: Digital download
Too Much Too Soon	Released: September 16, 2016; Label: Epidemic, We the Best, Epic; Format: Digital download
The LUH Tape	Released: February 14, 2017; Label: Epidemic, We the Best, Epic; Format: Digital download

=== Singles ===
==== As a lead artist ====
List of singles as lead artist, with selected chart positions and certifications, showing year released and album name
Title	Year	Peak chart positions										Certifications	Album
Title	Year	US	US R&B/ HH	US Rap	AUS	CAN	FRA	NLD	NZ	SWE	UK	Certifications	Album
"Don't Mind"	2016	8	3	1	19	14	35	25	20	38	9	RIAA: 2× Platinum; ARIA: Platinum; BPI: Platinum; RMNZ: Gold	Tours
"Alright"	2016	—	—	—	—	—	—	—	—	—	—		Non-album single
"Sit Down" (featuring Ty Dolla Sign, Lil Dicky and E-40)	2017	—	—	—	—	—	—	—	—	—	—		Too Much Too Soon
"Merengue"	2018	—	—	—	—	—	—	—	—	—	—		Non-album singles
"I Like It"	2019	—	—	—	—	—	—	—	—	—	—		Non-album singles
"No Plans for Love" (with D-Nice and Ne-Yo)	2021	—	—	—	—	—	—	—	—	—	—		Non-album singles

==== As featured artist ====
Title	Year	Peak chart positions		Album
Title	Year	IRE	UK	Album
"One Thing" (ThatBoyEric featuring Kent Jones)	2016	—	—	Non-album singles
"Not in Love" (M.O featuring Kent Jones)	2016	75	42	Non-album singles
"Sooner or Later" (Mia Martina featuring Kent Jones)	2017	—	—	Non-album singles
"Feels Like Home" (Sigala, Sean Paul and Fuse ODG featuring Kent Jones)	2018	52	71	Brighter Days

==== Guest appearances ====
List of non-single guest appearances, with other performing artists, showing year released and album name
Title	Year	Other artist(s)	Album
"365"	2015	DJ Khaled, Ace Hood, Vado	NBA 2K16 soundtrack
"Be Right Back (BRB)"	2015	A Fly Guy	Geniusland
"Don't Ever Play Yourself"	2016	DJ Khaled, Jadakiss, Fabolous, Fat Joe, Busta Rhymes	Major Key
"Smith & Wessen"	2016	Rowdy Rebel	Shmoney Keeps Calling
"Stretch Marks"	2016	Chocolate Droppa	Kevin Hart: What Now? (The Mixtape Presents Chocolate Droppa)
"Bitch Real"	2016	Kevin Lavell	Sorry 4 Nothing
"Blown"	2016	DNCE	DNCE
"In the Middle"	2016	Cashis	Ca-$ 1.5
"Swear to God"	2016	Fat Joe, Remy Ma	Plata O Plomo
"Spaghetti"	2016	Fat Joe, Remy Ma	Plata O Plomo
"How Can I Forget"	2016	Fat Joe, Remy Ma	Plata O Plomo
"Gangsta Song"	2016	E-40	The D-Boy Diary: Book 1
"Who You Talking To"	2018	E-40	The Gift of Gab

== Production discography ==
=== 2015 ===
==== The Game – The Documentary 2 ====
- 06. "Dollar and a Dream" (featuring Ab-Soul) (produced with Cool & Dre, iLLA and Just BonaFide)

=== 2016 ===
==== The Game – The Documentary 2 Collector's Edition ====
- 01. "Ride Solo" (produced with Cool & Dre)
- 02. "Do It to You" (featuring Trey Songz) (produced with Cool & Dre)

== Awards and nominations ==
=== Underground Interviews ===
Year	Nominee / work	Award	Result
2016	Himself	Rapper of the Year	Nominated

=== iHeartRadio Music Awards ===
Year	Nominee / work	Award	Result	Ref
2017	Himself	Best New Hip-Hop Artist	Nominated	
