= Sigala =

English DJ and music producer

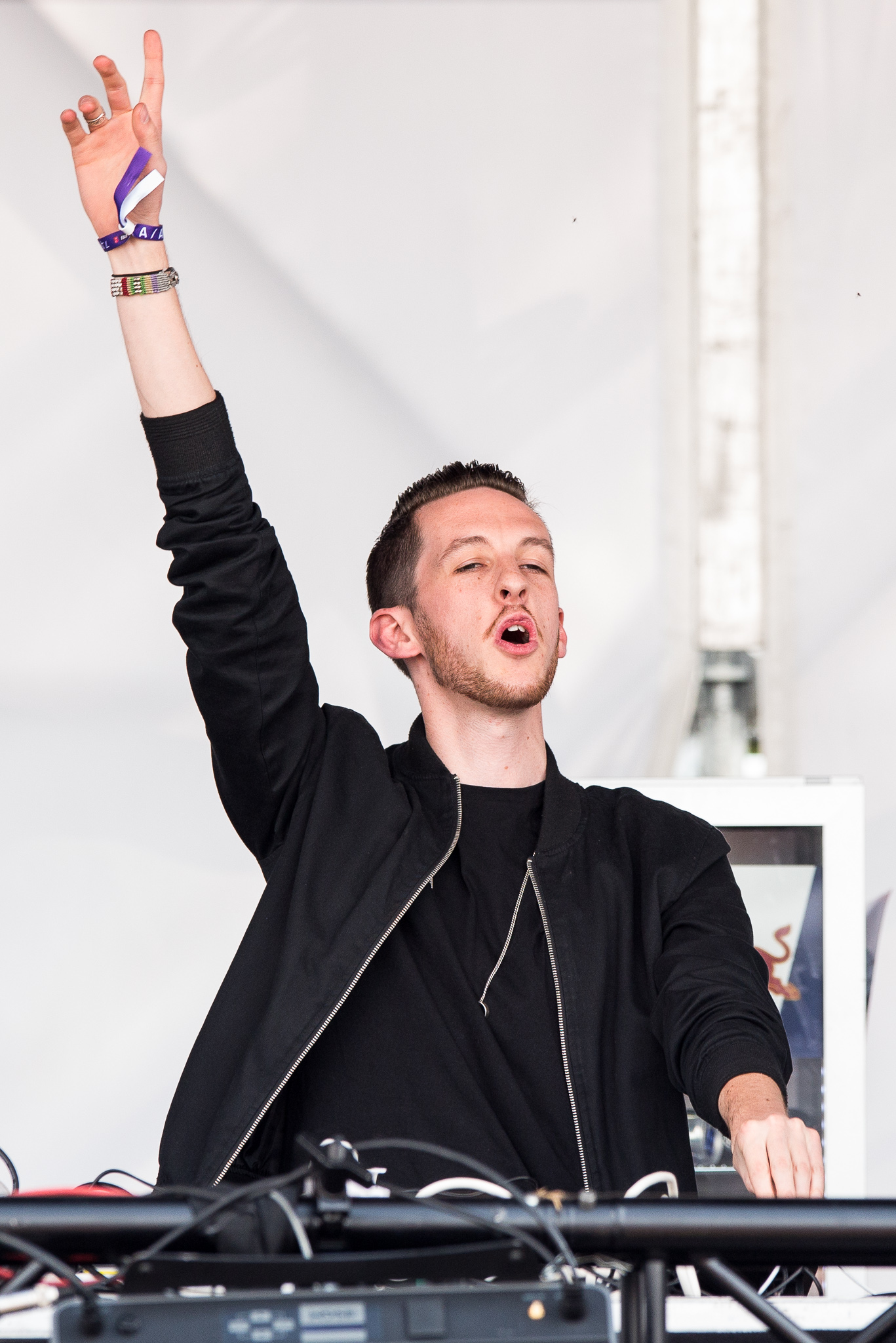
- Sigala in 2016

Background information
- Born: Bruce Fielder; Norfolk, England
- Genres: House; dance-pop; electronic; tropical house
- Occupations: DJ; record producer; remixer
- Years active: 2015–present
- Labels: Ministry of Sound; Columbia; Ultra; Arista
- Website: sigalamusic.com
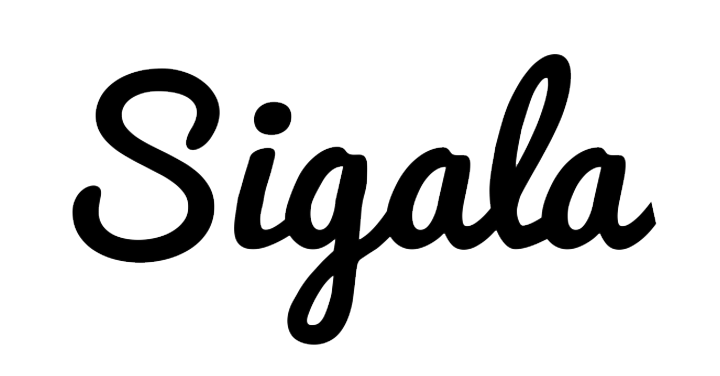

Bruce Fielder, known professionally as Sigala, is an English DJ and record producer. He has had eight songs peak within the top ten of the UK Singles Chart, including his 2015 debut single "Easy Love", which interpolates "ABC" by the Jackson 5.

== Career ==
=== Early career ===
Bruce Fielder was born and raised in Norfolk, England. He first got into music at age 8, when he began to play the piano, which he has up to grade 8. He attended Reepham High School and City College Norwich, before graduating with a BA honours degree in commercial music from the University of Westminster. He is based at Verdansk Studios in Kings Cross, London.

=== 2015–2018: Breakthrough and Brighter Days ===
After university, Bruce was a member of several unsigned bands before moving on to mixing and producing works for others, including co-writing "Good Times" by Ella Eyre with Sigma.

He took on the stage name Sigala after the family name of an ancestor on his mother's side.

His debut single, "Easy Love", came about after Fielder drank a six-pack of Desperados, a tequila-flavoured beer, in sheer tiredness and frustration after being asked to perform a thirty-seventh mix for a popular artist and downloaded an a cappella of the Jackson 5's single "ABC". In an interview with the Official Charts Company, he stated that the record was written on a Sunday evening out of a desire to create music for himself outside of the confines of "somebody asking me to create a song that had a certain sound to it or had to be a certain way".

A video was commissioned for it, set in Los Angeles, and features Lucky Aces, a Canadian duo composed of 12-year-olds, Lucky and C, dancing to it; in the video, after meeting each other, they challenge a number of child gangs. It was directed by Craig Moore, who said that he opted to shoot in Los Angeles due to the "pool of talent that would've been hard to find anywhere else", and that his attention was caught by Lucky Aces after spotting them on The Ellen Show. Within a few days, it had been picked up by Ministry of Sound, and the song entered at number 71 on the UK Singles Chart on 4 September 2015 – for the week ending dated 10 September 2015 – based on streams alone. The following week, it peaked at the top of the chart.

Sigala's second single was called "Sweet Lovin'". Released on 4 December 2015, and peaked at number three on the UK Singles Chart, with vocals from singer-songwriter Bryn Christopher.

Sigala released his third single, "Say You Do", on YouTube on 23 January 2016, and the single was released officially on 18 March 2016. It features a sample of Mariah Carey's "Always Be My Baby" and DJ Fresh, with vocals from singer Imani Williams.

Sigala was reported to be working on his debut studio album, revealing that his dream collaborations would be Stevie Wonder and Chris Martin. Shortly after this was announced, his next single, "Give Me Your Love", featuring vocals from John Newman and partial production works from Nile Rodgers, was released on 8 April 2016.

On 19 August 2016, Sigala released "Ain't Giving Up" with British singer Craig David.

Sigala contributed to "Only One" with Digital Farm Animals on 2 December 2016 and "Show You Love" with KATO, featuring vocals from American singer Hailee Steinfeld on 17 January 2017.

On 9 June 2017, Sigala collaborated with British singer-songwriter Ella Eyre for his sixth single "Came Here for Love".

On 23 February 2018, Sigala released a single with Paloma Faith titled "Lullaby". On 13 March 2018, Sigala said on Twitter that he had nearly finished his debut album.

Sigala's debut album Brighter Days was released on 28 September 2018. It peaked at number 14 in the UK. A mini-concert tour took place in the United Kingdom and Ireland in support of the album.

Sigala released "Feels Like Home" with British recording artist Fuse ODG and Jamaican rapper Sean Paul, featuring guest vocals from American recording artist Kent Jones on 14 June 2018 as the eighth single. "We Don't Care" was released on 27 July 2018 with British pop rock band The Vamps as the ninth single off the album.

On 7 September 2018, Sigala released the tenth and final single from the album titled "Just Got Paid" with Ella Eyre and American singer-songwriter Meghan Trainor, featuring American rapper French Montana.

=== 2019–2023: New singles, Every Cloud delays and scrapping ===
Sigala signed with the newly relaunched Arista Records in early 2019.

Sigala released "Wish You Well" on 24 May 2019 with vocals by British singer Becky Hill.

Ella Henderson features on his next single "We Got Love", released on 1 November 2019.

Becky Hill again featured on the single "Heaven on My Mind", released on 25 June 2020.

The song "Lasting Lover" with British singer James Arthur was written by Lewis Capaldi. The song was released alongside two vertical lyric videos on 4 September 2020. The song samples "Time to Pretend" by American indie band MGMT. At the APRA Music Awards of 2022 "Lasting Lover" won Most Performed International Work.

On 2 July 2021, Sigala released his new single "You For Me" with British singer-songwriter Rita Ora.

On 20 August 2021, Sigala collaborated with R3hab and JP Cooper on the song "Runaway".

On 21 January 2022, Sigala released the song "Melody".

On 20 May 2022, Sigala collaborated with British singer-songwriter and YouTuber Talia Mar on the song "Stay the Night".

On 2 September 2022, Sigala teamed up with French DJ David Guetta and British singer-songwriter Sam Ryder on the song "Living Without You".

On 3 March 2023, Sigala issued Every Cloud – Silver Linings, the intended first part of his then-upcoming second album Every Cloud. It included the 11 tracks that had been issued as singles from the album to that point. The release date had initially been intended as that of the full album. Ultimately, on 9 November 2023, Sigala announced on social media that Every Cloud had been scrapped following several delays, including pushing the 3 March and 29 September dates to 1 December, due to a sample clearance issue, which he expressed was the reason for the delays. Sigala also confirmed in the announcement of the album's scrapping that he had been working on some new music.

=== 2024: New music ===
Sigala debuted a new logo and announced a single with American rapper 24kGoldn and singer-songwriter Trevor Daniel titled "It's a Feeling", which was released on 5 July 2024.

== Discography ==
Studio albums

- Brighter Days (2018)
- Every Cloud – Silver Linings (2023)

== Tours ==
Headlining

- Brighter Days Tour (2018)
- Sigala World Tour (2020)
