= Sweet Lovin' =

Single by Sigala featuring Bryn Christopher

from the album Brighter Days
- Released: 4 December 2015
- Recorded: 2015
- Genre: Tropical house
- Length: 3:22 (radio edit); 4:57 (extended mix)
- Label: Ministry of Sound
- Songwriters: Bryn Christopher; Bruce Fielder
- Producer: Sigala

Sigala singles chronology
| "Easy Love" (2015) | "Sweet Lovin'" (2015) | "Say You Do" (2016) |

Bryn Christopher singles chronology
| "City Lights" (2015) | "Sweet Lovin'" (2015) | "Me, Myself & I" (2018) |

"Sweet Lovin'" is the second single by British DJ and producer Sigala. It features vocals from British singer and songwriter Bryn Christopher. It was released on 4 December 2015 as a digital download in the United Kingdom through Ministry of Sound. It is the follow-up to his UK number-one single "Easy Love". The song reached number 3 in the United Kingdom and number 6 in Ireland.

== Critical reception ==
In a highly positive review, Lewis Corner of Digital Spy called the song "another tropical house thumper with a euphoric chorus and luscious, soulful vocals."

== Music video ==
The official music video was filmed in Los Angeles, California. It was uploaded to Sigala's official Vevo channel on 13 November 2015. It features Candice Heiden (of LA Roller Girls Entertainment) rollerskating around the streets and leaving clouds of red smoke in her wake, causing anyone in the path of the smoke to dance to the tropical track's infectious beat. At the end of the video, she is joined by others including Nicole Leonard (also of LA Roller Girls Entertainment) and dancer Marissa Heart. The video has reached 277 million views on YouTube as of April 2026.

== Track listing ==
Digital download – single
| No. | Title | Length |
|---|---|---|
| 1. | "Sweet Lovin'" (featuring Bryn Christopher; radio edit) | 3:22 |

Digital download – EP
| No. | Title | Length |
|---|---|---|
| 1. | "Sweet Lovin'" (re-edit) | 4:13 |
| 2. | "Sweet Lovin'" (Brookes Brothers remix) | 3:46 |
| 3. | "Sweet Lovin'" (Crookers remix) | 5:43 |
| 4. | "Sweet Lovin'" (Steve Smart remix) | 4:21 |
| 5. | "Sweet Lovin'" (extended mix) | 4:57 |

== Charts ==
=== Weekly charts ===
| Chart (2015–2016) | Peak position |
|---|---|
| Australia (ARIA) | 11 |
| Austria (Ö3 Austria Top 40) | 7 |
| Belgium (Ultratop 50 Flanders) | 10 |
| Belgium Dance (Ultratop Flanders) | 5 |
| Belgium (Ultratip Bubbling Under Wallonia) | 8 |
| Belgium Dance (Ultratop Wallonia) | 13 |
| Czech Republic Airplay (ČNS IFPI) | 3 |
| Czech Republic Singles Digital (ČNS IFPI) | 4 |
| France (SNEP) | 115 |
| Germany (GfK) | 15 |
| Hungary (Dance Top 40) | 26 |
| Hungary (Rádiós Top 40) | 8 |
| Hungary (Single Top 40) | 24 |
| Ireland (IRMA) | 6 |
| Mexico Anglo (Monitor Latino) | 15 |
| Netherlands (Dutch Top 40) | 23 |
| Netherlands (Single Top 100) | 44 |
| New Zealand Heatseekers (RMNZ) | 2 |
| Poland Airplay (ZPAV) | 2 |
| Scottish Singles Sales (Official Charts) | 1 |
| Slovakia Airplay (ČNS IFPI) | 32 |
| Slovenia (SloTop50) | 22 |
| Sweden (Sverigetopplistan) | 29 |
| Switzerland (Schweizer Hitparade) | 31 |
| UK Singles (Official Charts) | 3 |
| UK Dance (Official Charts) | 1 |
| UK Indie (Official Charts) | 1 |
| US Hot Dance/Electronic Songs (Billboard) | 37 |

=== Year-end charts ===
| Chart (2016) | Position |
|---|---|
| Austria (Ö3 Austria Top 40) | 68 |
| Germany (Official German Charts) | 84 |
| Hungary (Dance Top 40) | 94 |
| Hungary (Rádiós Top 40) | 45 |
| Hungary (Single Top 40) | 100 |
| Poland (ZPAV) | 24 |
| UK Singles (OCC) | 64 |

== Certifications ==
| Region | Certification | Certified units/sales |
|---|---|---|
| Australia (ARIA) | Platinum | 70,000^{‡} |
| Austria (IFPI Austria) | Gold | 15,000^{‡} |
| Canada (Music Canada) | Gold | 40,000^{‡} |
| Denmark (IFPI Danmark) | Platinum | 90,000^{‡} |
| Germany (BVMI) | Gold | 200,000^{‡} |
| New Zealand (RMNZ) | Platinum | 30,000^{‡} |
| Norway (IFPI Norway) | Gold | 20,000^{‡} |
| Sweden (GLF) | Platinum | 40,000^{‡} |
| United Kingdom (BPI) | 2× Platinum | 1,200,000^{‡} |
^{‡} Sales+streaming figures based on certification alone.

== Release history ==
| Region | Date | Format | Label |
|---|---|---|---|
| Ireland | 4 December 2015 | Digital download | Ministry of Sound |
| United Kingdom | 4 December 2015 | Digital download | Ministry of Sound |
