= Ella Eyre discography =

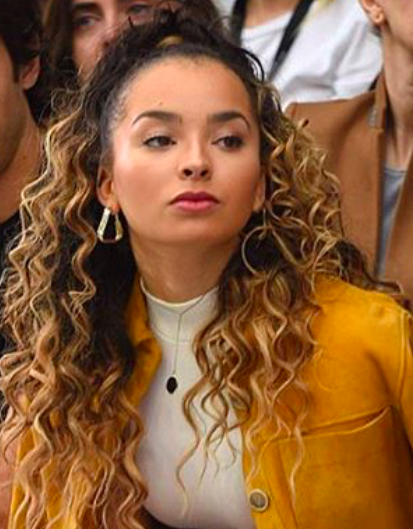
- Eyre in 2016
- Studio albums: 2
- EPs: 3
- Singles: 29

The discography of English singer and songwriter Ella Eyre consists of two studio albums, three extended plays, twenty-nine singles and various guest appearances and songwriting credits. Eyre's studio album, Feline, was released in August 2015. It peaked at number 4 on the UK Albums Chart and includes the singles "Deeper", "If I Go", "Comeback", "Together" and "Good Times". It was followed by her second studio album a decade later, Everything, in Time, in 2025.

== Studio albums ==
Title	Details	Peak chart positions				Certifications
Title	Details	UK	BEL (FL)	IRE	SWI	Certifications
Feline	Released: 28 August 2015; Label: Virgin EMI; Formats: CD, digital download, streaming	4	35	35	70	BPI: Gold
Everything, in Time	Released: 21 November 2025; Label: PIAS; Formats: CD, digital download, LP, streaming	—	—	—	—	

== Extended plays ==
Title	Details
Deeper	Released: 13 December 2013; Label: Virgin EMI; Format: Digital download, streaming
Ella Eyre	Released: 10 February 2015; Label: Virgin EMI (US release); Format: Digital download, streaming
Quarter Life Crisis	Released: 14 August 2020; Label: Island; Format: Digital download, streaming

== Singles ==
=== As lead artist ===
Title	Year	Peak chart positions									Certifications	Album
Title	Year	UK	AUS	IRE	NLD	POL	SCO	SWI	SWE	US Dance	Certifications	Album
"Deeper"	2013	72	—	—	—	—	—	—	—	—		Deeper, Ella Eyre & Feline
"If I Go"	2014	16	—	80	—	—	9	—	—	—	BPI: Silver	Ella Eyre & Feline
"Comeback"	2014	12	—	—	—	—	10	—	—	—	BPI: Silver	Ella Eyre & Feline
"Together"	2015	12	—	82	—	—	6	—	—	—	BPI: Silver	Feline
"Good Times"	2015	37	—	—	—	—	14	—	—	—	BPI: Silver	Feline & Life
"Swing Low, Sweet Chariot"	2015	134	—	—	—	—	87	—	—	—		Non-album single
"Came Here for Love" (with Sigala)	2017	6	53	9	28	4	2	49	66	32	BPI: 3× Platinum; ARIA: Gold; FIMI: Gold; GLF: Gold; IFPI DEN: Gold; IFPI SWI: Gold; RMNZ: Platinum; ZPAV: Platinum	Brighter Days
"Ego" (featuring Ty Dolla Sign)	2017	67	—	—	—	—	33	—	— (Note: "Ego" did not chart on the Swedish singles chart, but peaked at number one on the Sweden Heatseeker chart.)	—		Non-album singles
"Answerphone" (with Banx & Ranx featuring Yxng Bane)	2018	5	—	10	88	72	10	—	—	22	BPI: Platinum	Non-album singles
"Just Got Paid" (with Sigala and Meghan Trainor featuring French Montana)	2018	11	—	12	—	44	7	40	— (Note: "Just Got Paid" did not enter the Swedish Singellista Chart, but peaked at number five on the Swedish Heatseeker Chart.)	24	BPI: Platinum; ARIA: Gold; RMNZ: Platinum; ZPAV: Gold	Brighter Days
"Mama" (with Banx & Ranx featuring Kiana Ledé)	2019	—	—	—	—	—	—	—	—	—		Non-album singles
"New Me"	2020	—	—	—	—	—	—	—	—	—		Non-album singles
"L.O.V.(e)"	2020	—	—	—	—	—	—	—	—	—		Quarter Life Crisis
"Dreams" (with Yxng Bane)	2020	—	—	—	—	—	—	—	—	—		Quarter Life Crisis
"Careless"	2020	—	—	—	—	—	—	—	—	—		Quarter Life Crisis
"Tell Me About It"	2020	—	—	—	—	—	—	—	—	—		Quarter Life Crisis
"Wired" (with Sonny Fodera)	2020	—	—	—	—	—	—	—	—	—		Wide Awake
"Don't You Want Me"	2020	—	—	—	—	—	—	—	—	—		Non-album singles
"Deep Down" (with Alok and Kenny Dope featuring Never Dull)	2022	62	—	34	20	28	—	—	—	32	BPI: Gold; RMNZ: Gold	Non-album singles
"No Angels" (with Bastille)	2023	—	—	—	—	—	—	—	—	—		Bad Blood X
"Head in the Ground" (with Tiggs Da Author)	2023	—	—	—	—	—	—	—	—	—		Everything, in Time
"Ain't No Love That Blind"	2024	—	—	—	—	—	—	—	—	—		Everything, in Time
"Domino Szn"	2024	—	—	—	—	—	—	—	—	—		Everything, in Time
"High on the Internet" (with Jay Prince)	2025	—	—	—	—	—	—	—	—	—		Everything, in Time
"Kintsugi"	2025	—	—	—	—	—	—	—	—	—		Everything, in Time
"Space"	2025	—	—	—	—	—	—	—	—	—		Everything, in Time
"Red Flags & Love Hearts"	2025	—	—	—	—	—	—	—	—	—		Everything, in Time
"Hell Yeah"	2025	—	—	—	—	—	—	—	—	—		Everything, in Time
"Little Things"	2025	—	—	—	—	—	—	—	—	—		Everything, in Time
"—" denotes a recording that did not chart or was not released in that territory.

=== As featured artist ===
Title	Year	Peak chart positions										Certifications	Album
Title	Year	UK	UK Dance	AUS	AUT	BEL (FL)	IRE	NL	NZ	SCO	SWI	Certifications	Album
"Waiting All Night" (Rudimental featuring Ella Eyre)	2013	1	1	6	37	13	4	26	9	2	67	BPI: 3× Platinum; ARIA: Platinum; BEA: Gold; RMNZ: 4× Platinum	Home
"Think About It" (Naughty Boy featuring Wiz Khalifa and Ella Eyre)	2013	78	—	—	—	—	—	—	—	—	—		Hotel Cabana
"Gravity" (DJ Fresh featuring Ella Eyre)	2015	4	1	—	—	16	67	86	—	5	—	BPI: Platinum	Feline
"Bridge over Troubled Water" (as part of Artists for Grenfell)	2017	1	—	53	32	26	25	—	— (Note: "Bridge over Troubled Water" did not enter the NZ Top 40 Singles Chart, but peaked at number four on the NZ Heatseekers Singles Chart.)	1	28	BPI: Gold	Non-album single
"Body Loose" (Dizzee Rascal featuring Ella Eyre)	2020	—	—	—	—	—	—	—	—	—	—		E3 AF
"Stop Crying Your Heart Out" (as BBC Radio 2's Allstars)	2020	7	—	—	—	—	—	—	—	—	—		Non-album single
"—" denotes a recording that did not chart or was not released in that territory.

== Other charted songs ==
Title	Year	Peak chart positions			Certifications	Album
Title	Year	UK	GER	SWI	Certifications	Album
"Someday (Place in the Sun)" (Tinie Tempah featuring Ella Eyre)	2014	87	88	61		Demonstration
"We Don't Have to Take Our Clothes Off"	2015	54	—	—	BPI: Platinum; GLF: Gold; RMNZ: Platinum	Ella Eyre
"—" denotes a recording that did not chart or was not released in that territory.

== Guest appearances ==
Title	Year	Other artist(s)	Album
"No Angels"	2012	Bastille	Other People's Heartache Pt. 2
"Free"	2012	Bastille, Erika	Other People's Heartache Pt. 2
"Someday (Place in the Sun)"	2013	Tinie Tempah	Demonstration
"Too Cool"	2015	Rudimental	We the Generation
"Up"	2015	Olly Murs	Never Been Better (special edition)
"Business"	2021	Becky Hill	Only Honest on the Weekend

== Songwriting credits ==
Title	Year	Artist(s)	Album	Credits
"Changing"	2014	Sigma (featuring Paloma Faith)	Life	Co-writer
"Black Smoke"	2015	Ann Sophie	Silver Into Gold	Co-writer
"We Don't Care"	2018	Sigala (with The Vamps)	Brighter Days	Co-writer
"Your Ex"	2018	Paloma Faith	The Architect (Zeitgeist Edition)	Co-writer
"Mutual"	2018	Laura Tesoro	TBA	Co-writer
"Gone"	2022	Twice	Between 1&2	Co-writer
"Feels This Good" (with Mae Muller and Caity Baser featuring Stefflon Don)	2023	Sigala	Every Cloud	Co-writer
"Ice Cream"	2024	Jeon Somi	Non-album single	Lyrics
