= Everything, in Time =

2025 album by Ella Eyre

Studio album by Ella Eyre
- Released: 21 November 2025
- Genre: Pop; R&B; soul; pop rock
- Length: 47:21
- Label: PIAS
- Producer: Aston Rudi; Luke Smith; Mike Spencer; Johan Lindbrandt; Robin Stjernberg; Albin Tengblad; Simon Jonasson; Jungleboi; Guy Langley; Lael Goldberg; DetoNate; Oliver Frid; Ross Hamilton; Stephen McGregor

Ella Eyre chronology
Quarter Life Crisis (2020)	Everything, in Time (2025)

Singles from Everything, in Time
- 1. "Head in the Ground" Released: 22 November 2023; 2. "Ain't No Love That Blind" Released: 8 May 2024; 3. "Domino Szn" Released: 31 July 2024; 4. "High on the Internet" Released: 9 May 2025; 5. "Kintsugi" Released: 11 June 2025; 6. "Space" Released: 15 July 2025; 7. "Red Flags & Love Hearts" Released: 27 August 2025; 8. "Hell Yeah" Released: 30 September 2025; 9. "Little Things" Released: 7 November 2025

Everything, in Time is the second studio album by English singer and songwriter Ella Eyre. It was released on 21 November 2025 through PIAS Recordings and marks her first album in over a decade, following her debut album, Feline (2015). Eyre had initially began work on the album prior to the COVID-19 pandemic, but after she required vocal surgery and had to relearn how to sing, she scrapped all of her previous work and left her former label, Island Records, over musical disagreements. Eyre then commenced work on Everything, in Time.

Eyre signed with PIAS after having completed an initial iteration of the album, but following a breakup with a long-term partner, she returned to the studio to amend it one final time. She confirmed it was much harder making an album on an independent budget, having become aware of the cost of making music that she had been unaware of previously. Eyre's musical comeback was celebrated and Everything, in Time was mostly praised by critics, with The Independent complimenting her post-surgery voice. She also received comparisons to Amy Winehouse following its release.

Everything, in Time is primarily a pop, R&B and soul record, with lyrical content centered around experiences with breakups, falling in love, modern society and enjoying life. Eyre began releasing singles from the album in 2023, with nine in total preceding its release.

== Background and release ==
Eyre released her debut studio album, Feline, in 2015. It featured numerous commercially successful singles, including "If I Go", "Comeback", "Together", "Good Times", "Gravity" with DJ Fresh and a cover of "We Don't Have to Take Our Clothes Off". After a two-year break, Eyre began releasing and featuring on various singles including "Came Here for Love" with Sigala, "Ego" featuring Ty Dolla Sign and "Answerphone" with Banx & Ranx. Also in 2017, Eyre split from her boyfriend of two years, with her father dying two months later.

After a further two-year break, Eyre announced in 2019 that she had signed with Island Records. Whilst filming for a music video for an extended play under Island, she suffered from a kidney infection and severe shellfish allergy, which resulted in facial swelling and secretion. Then, during the COVID-19 lockdowns, Eyre underwent a vocal surgery that meant she had to relearn how to speak. After she "emerged with a clearer sense of self", she parted with Island, who did not agree that Eyre's music was strong enough. She explained that Island wanted her to continue with her successful dance sound to get radio play, comparing her to Becky Hill. However, Eyre did not enjoy writing dance music and instead wanted to lean into the "classy soul-pop that spoke naturally to her". Eyre then took ownership of her masters and scrapped all of her unreleased music. She previously had an early iteration of the album but explained that it did not feel right, so recommenced work on it.

Eyre signed with independent label PIAS Recordings in 2023 with her second album completed. However, she then split with her partner of over seven years, a breakup that she described as an "earthquake". Eyre felt changed by the event and experienced a "breakthrough", after which she went back to the studio to amend the album and write new songs for it. In November 2023, she released "Head in the Ground", her first independent release and the first single from Everything, in Time. Eyre explained that the stakes became higher as an independent artist, stating: "the pressure is on as an independent artist, on an independent budget. When you don’t have a major label footing all the bills that you weren’t aware of, everything becomes very real. Not only do I want it to go well, but I need it to go well, because we’re having to work 10 times harder to get to that point." One difference she noted was not having cars and shoots arranged by a label, instead having to make her own way to a music video shoot at four in the morning, which she felt made the work feel more real. Eyre continued releasing singles until the eventual release of Everything, in Time on 21 November 2025. When asked what she hoped her former labels would think of her release, she hoped they would be happy for her finally getting to release another body of work.

== Composition ==
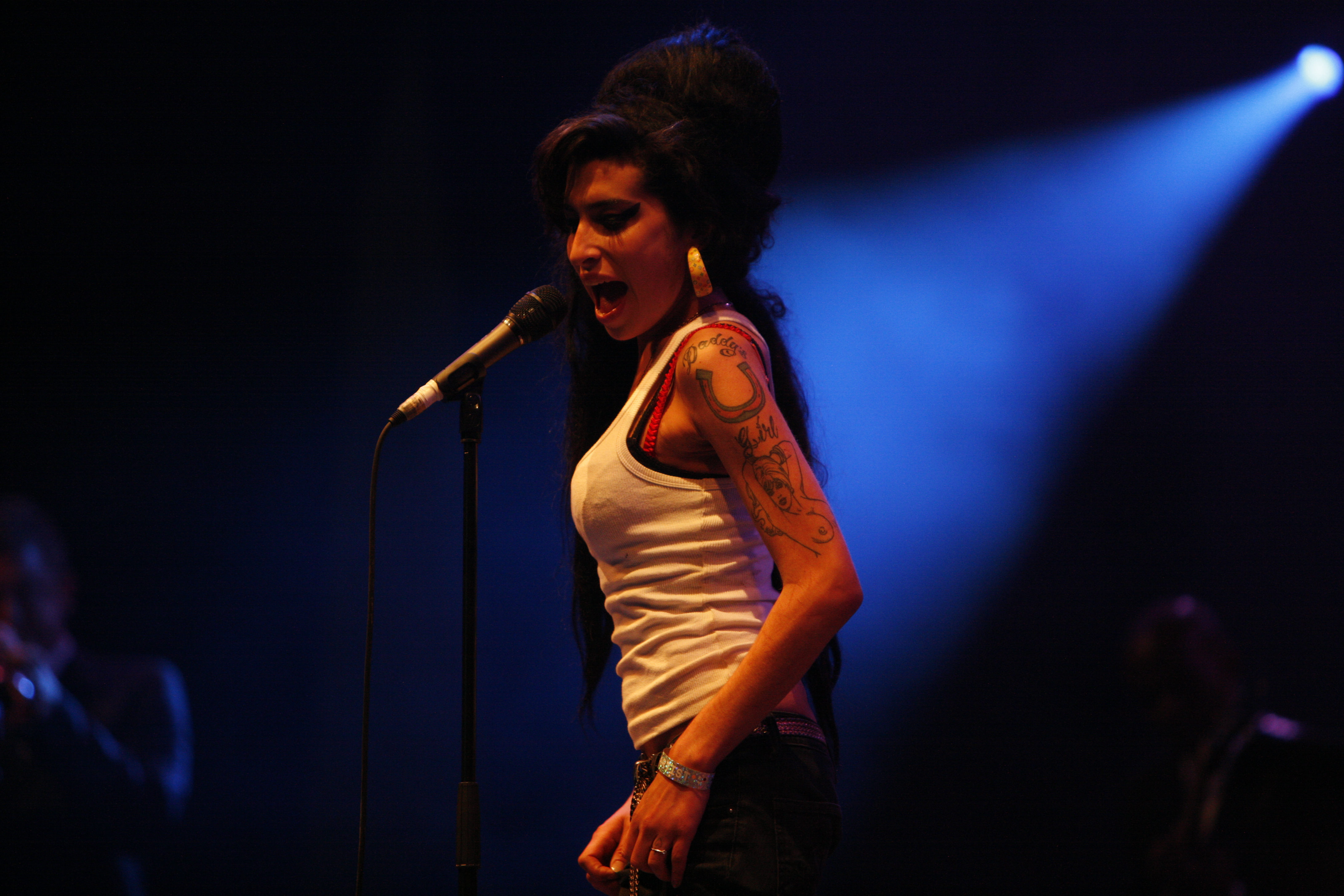
Eyre received comparisons to Amy Winehouse for Everything, in Time.

The title track, which also acts as the opening track to Everything, in Time, was likened to the work of Amy Winehouse. They also incorporate "loping, rattling drums and prowling, defiant, jazzy delivery", as well as making use of electric guitars. The second track, "Head in the Ground", was compared to old-school gospel tracks that encompasses a "swaggering bass" and a "low-slung rap section" from Tiggs Da Author. "High on the Internet" is one of the mellower tracks, in which Eyre talks about having an addiction to the internet, performing for the sake of followers and wanting to disconnect. "Domino Szn" is an R&B track and is about the feeling of falling in love. It was likened to her early work with Sigala.

"Red Flags & Love Hearts" was described as a Caribbean-inspired song, with the lyrical content calling out a gaslighter. Like the title track, this was also compared to Winehouse. "This Shit Hurts" was likened to the sound of her debut album and features diverse vocals from Eyre. "Kintsugi" saw the album return to a mellow sound with a "unexpected, proggy synthesiser". "Ain't No Love That Blind" follows it, bringing the energy up with a rock pop sound. The track features a "walloping melodramatic, rock guitar-backed vocal hook". The slower "Little Things" was described as a "sonically reassuring" song that feels like "a warm hug from your big sister". "Hell Yeah", which Eyre noted had been a fan-favourite at live gigs, is a "upbeat, fun depiction of a wilder time" written about Eyre's early twenties. "Space" is a soul and R&B track that was described as "a brass-backed belter of an empowerment anthem" with Eyre declaring that she wants a break from an ex.

== Critical reception ==
Professional ratings
Review scores
Source	Rating
Buzz	4/5 stars
The Independent	3/5 stars
Indie Is Not a Genre	3.5/5 stars

Buzz magazine noted Eyre's personal struggles since her debut album and billed Everything, in Time a "winner". They declared that the album had no tracks they would skip and "comes packing powerful, high-quality r'n'b and funk belters from start to finish". They also felt that Eyre sounded fresh on the project, describing her as a "creative force".

The Independent noted Eyre's struggle to escape a "Dance-Pop Guest Vocalist" reputation, likening her to Raye. However, they felt she had succeeded with "well crafted" tracks and despite her vocal surgery, noted that her voice was a strong instrument of Everything, in Time. The Independent likened Eyre's work to that of Amy Winehouse's and was surprised by the range of instrumentals and sonics on the album, as well as Eyre's confidence. They gave it three stars out of five, noting that the songs "feel familiar", but still "prop you up, with warmth and integrity".

Review website Indie is not a Genre gave the album 3.5 stars out of 5. The website praised Eyre for her comeback and appreciated that it does not feel like a dramatic one, but instead a "steady, deliberate re-entry from an artist determined to rebuild without rushing herself". Like The Independent, they also likened her to Winehouse, but felt that she also had her own distinctive sound. They closed off their review by praising Eyre's authenticity on the album, excited by what her next releases would sound like.

== Track listing ==
All lyrics are written by Ella McMahon, except "Head in the Ground" (lyrics by McMahon and Tiggs Da Author) and "Domino Szn" (lyrics by McMahon and Sinai Tedros).

Everything, in Time track listing
No.	Title	Music	Producer(s)	Length
1.	"Everything, in Time"	Ella McMahon; Aston Rudi; Jay Prince; Sam Posner	Rudi	3:29
2.	"Head in the Ground" (featuring Tiggs Da Author)	McMahon; Jonny Lattimer; Rudi; Tiggs Da Author	Rudi; Luke Smith; Mike Spencer	2:54
3.	"High on the Internet" (featuring Jay Prince)	McMahon; Johan Lindbrandt; Radhika Wilson; Robin Stjernberg	Lindbrandt; Stjernberg	3:22
4.	"Domino Szn"	McMahon; Albin Tengblad; Simon Jonasson; Sinai Tedros	Tengblad; Jonasson	3:44
5.	"Diamonds"	McMahon; Adam Argyle; Andrew Murray; Naitumela Masuku	Jungleboi	2:43
6.	"Red Flags & Love Hearts"	McMahon; Rudi; Lattimer; Tedros	Rudi	3:04
7.	"This Shit Hurts"	McMahon; Guy Langley; Lael Goldberg; Scott McFarnon	Langley; Goldberg	3:09
8.	"Kintsugi"	McMahon; Masuku; Nathaniel Ledwidge	DetoNate	3:27
9.	"Ain't No Love That Blind"	McMahon; Masuku; Ledwidge; Tedros	DetoNate; Smith; Spencer	2:37
10.	"What About Me"	McMahon; Rudi; Prince; Tedros	Rudi	2:45
11.	"Little Things"	McMahon; Emelie Walcott; Smith; Oliver Frid; Jonasson	Smith; Frid	3:33
12.	"Hell Yeah"	McMahon; Max Wolfgang; Sylvester Sivertsen	Jungleboi; Ross Hamilton; Spencer	2:53
13.	"Loverman"	McMahon; Dan Caplen; Langley; Goldberg	Langley; Goldberg	3:26
14.	"Space"	McMahon; Argyle; Langley; Goldberg	Langley; Goldberg	2:42
15.	"Rain in Heaven (Demo)"	McMahon; Caplen; Stephen McGregor	McGregor	3:28
Total length:				47:21

== Personnel ==
Credits adapted from Tidal.

=== Musicians ===
- Ella Eyre – lead vocals
- Sam Posner – bass guitar (track 1)
- Leo Abrahams – guitar (2, 3, 5, 8, 9)
- Axel Ekermann – bass guitar (2, 3, 5, 8)
- Dario Scotti – drums (2, 5, 8, 9)
- Rob Harris – guitar (2)
- Annabel Spooner – background vocals (3, 8, 9, 11)
- Meshach Spooner – background vocals (3, 8, 9, 11)
- Jay Prince – lead vocals (3)
- Jonny Lattimer – bass guitar (6)
- Guy Langley – bass guitar (7); drums, guitar (13); keyboards (14)
- Lael Goldberg – drums, guitar (7, 13, 14)
- Lewis Moody – Hammond organ (7), piano (13)
- Axel Bowman – bass guitar (9)
- Paul Jones – keyboards (9)
- Luke Smith – bass guitar (10)
- Dan Caplen – background vocals (13)
- David Baker – bass guitar (13)
- Alex Meadows – bass guitar (14)

=== Technical ===
- Alex Killpatrick – mixing (1, 6, 10)
- Mike Spencer – mixing (2, 9, 12)
- Engine Earz – mixing (3, 7, 11, 13)
- Prash Mistry – mixing (4, 5)
- Lee Smith – mixing (8)
- Kieran Beardmore – mixing (14)
- Stephen McGregor – mixing (15)

== Charts ==
Chart performance for Everything, in Time
Chart (2025)	Peak position
UK Albums Sales (OCC)	36
UK Independent Albums (OCC)	10
