= Hathaway Academy =

The Hathaway Academy

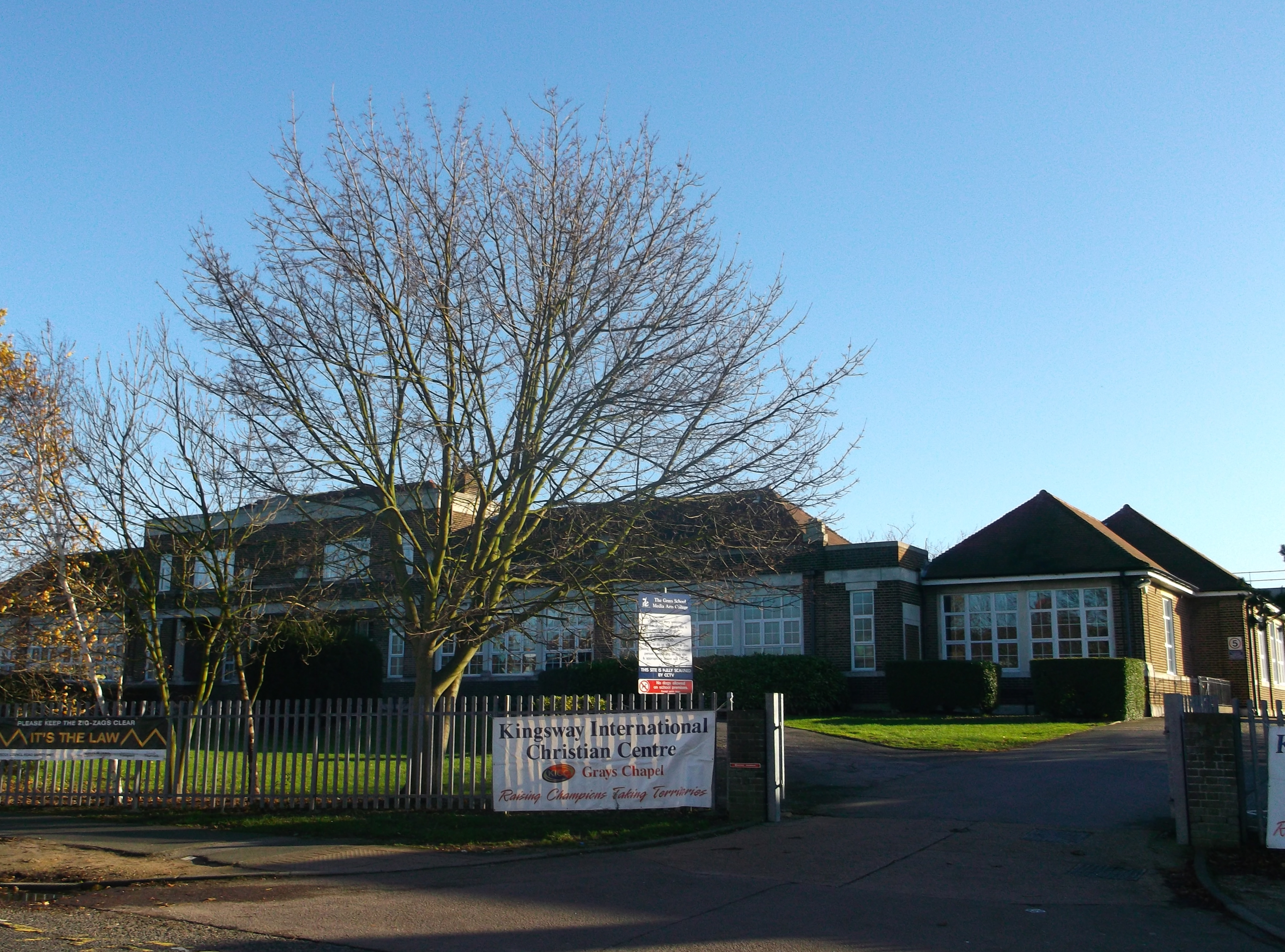

Location
- Hathaway Road; Grays, Essex, RM17 5LL; England; 51.4890°N 0.3279°E

Information
- Type: Academy
- Motto: Inspire, Aspire, Achieve
- Established: 1925; 101 years ago
- Local authority: Thurrock Council
- Specialist: Arts (digital media and performing arts)
- Department for Education URN: 139578 Tables
- Ofsted: Reports
- Principal: Fatima Rodrigues
- Staff: 71
- Gender: Coeducational
- Age: 11 to 16
- Enrolment: 782 as of November 2021
- Capacity: 900 to 1000
- Houses: Purpose; Engagement; Self-Worth
- Colours: Azure, blue and white
- Publication: Hathaway Herald
- Trust: Academy Transformation Trust
- Website: hathawayacademy.attrust.org.uk

The Hathaway Academy, formerly the Grays School Media Arts College (TGSMAC or Grays School), is a coeducational, non-selective secondary school with academy status that is located in Grays, Essex, England. It is currently part of the Academy Transformation Trust. A school has existed on the Hathaway Road site since 1931, when the John Henry Burrows Central Council School moved from nearby Bridge Road. The school became a secondary technical in 1945 and a comprehensive school in 1971. In 1993, it was given grant-maintained status and was renamed the Grays School. In 2004, it specialised and became the Grays School Media Arts College, which closed in June 2013 with the subsequent opening of the current academy-status school. The academy school has since retained TGSMAC's specialisms, which are digital media and performing arts.

Since 2015, the school has held an OFSTED rating of "good"; from 2009 it was rated "satisfactory/requires improvement", and between 2007 and 2009, it was rated "special measures". The pupil demography is mostly White British, with a large Eastern European population. Around 30% of the pupils speak English as an additional language, a higher proportion than the national average. As of 2021, 64.2% of pupils were boys and 35.8% were girls, and there were 782 pupils on the roll.

== History ==
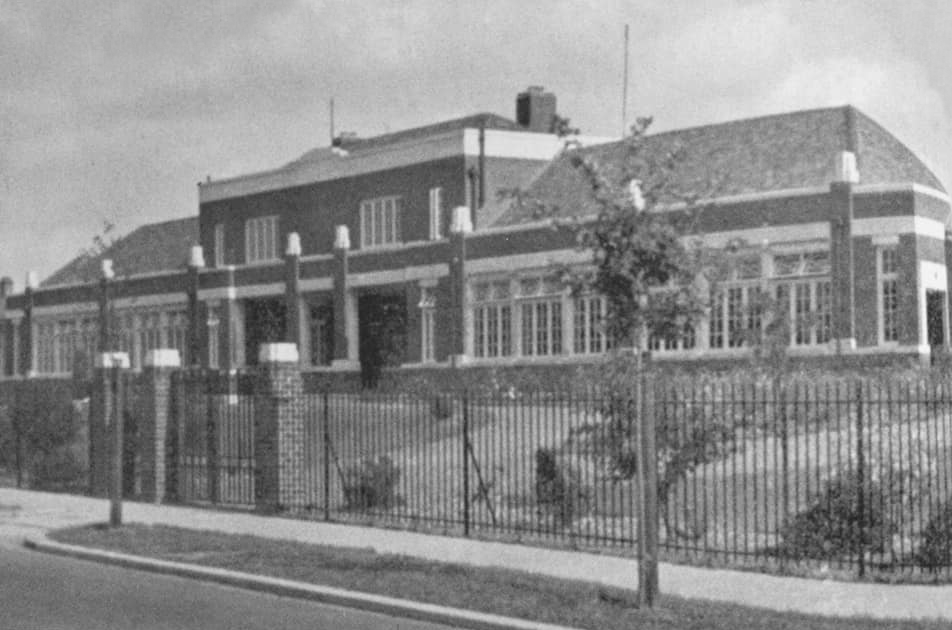
John Henry Burrows Intermediate in 1936

=== Early years (1925–1971) ===
In 1925, John Henry Burrows Central Council School opened on the former site of Bridge Road Infants' School. In 1931, the school was relocated from Bridge Road to Hathaway Road. In 1935, it became a middle school and was renamed John Henry Burrows Intermediate School. The name "John Henry Burrows" may have originated from Alderman John H. Burrows, who was influential throughout Essex, primarily in Southend-on-Sea, Hadleigh, Tilbury and Grays.

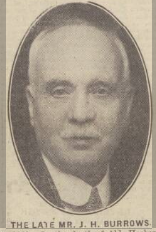
Alderman John H. Burrows pictured in 1935

On 30 August 1939, the school was nearly destroyed when an aeroplane crashed into one of its playing fields. The pilot of a Spitfire from nearby RAF Hornchurch lost control during a training exercise, and during the crash it narrowly missed the roofs of some nearby houses before crashing into the playing field. The pilot, Cyril Douglas Gower, had been flying in formation with two other Spitfire fighters when his aircraft collided with the wingtip of another and lost control. He did not survive the crash.

After the end of the European theatre of the Second World War the school was granted secondary technical status and became Grays County Technical High School, which was abbreviated to Grays Tech. It existed from 1945 to 1968. The only confirmed headmaster of Grays Tech was Cyril Baggs, who left in 1957 to become head of Fryerns School in Basildon. The headmaster after Mr Baggs was Mr Dolman until at least 1960. In 1968, Grays Tech merged with Aveley County Technical High School on Nethan Drive, Aveley, to become Aveley and Grays Technical High School.

Aveley and Grays Technical High School had one headmaster, Frederick F. Harsant. The school motto was Rara Avis in Terra ("A Rare Bird Upon the Earth"). The amalgamation remained in force until a reorganisation in 1971, when the two schools would separate. Grays Tech was henceforth known as Grays Comprehensive School, remaining at the Hathaway Road site. Aveley Tech continued operations until 1972, when as part of the reorganisation of education in Essex, Palmer's Boys' and Girls' Schools amalgamated with Aveley Tech to constitute a sixth form college, which became Palmer's College.

=== Grays School (1971–2013) ===
Grays Comprehensive School was a "social priority" school, meaning that teachers were paid extra. It was also underperforming academically. The deputy headteacher was Alan Goodwin. It became grant-maintained in 1993 and "Comprehensive" was removed from the name. By this time, the deputy headteacher was Simon Viccars. After the school was given grant-maintained status, its budget grew by 500%.

In 1996, the school was granted Investors in People status and in September 1999 the school gained foundation status. By 2001, the headteacher was James Winstone, who likely left in 2002 and was succeeded by Mark Griffin in 2003. Griffin decided to apply to the DFES in March 2003 for the school to specialise as a visual arts college. His application was supported by Lord David Puttnam and other supporting comprehensive schools from Essex and surrounding areas. In September 2004 the school successfully specialised and became the Grays School Media Arts College. At around the same time, Deputy Head Simon Viccars left the school to become headteacher of the Leon School and Sports College in Milton Keynes. Both Tim Rider and John Marchant succeeded Viccars, and they shared the deputyship.

==== 2007 incidents and special measures ====
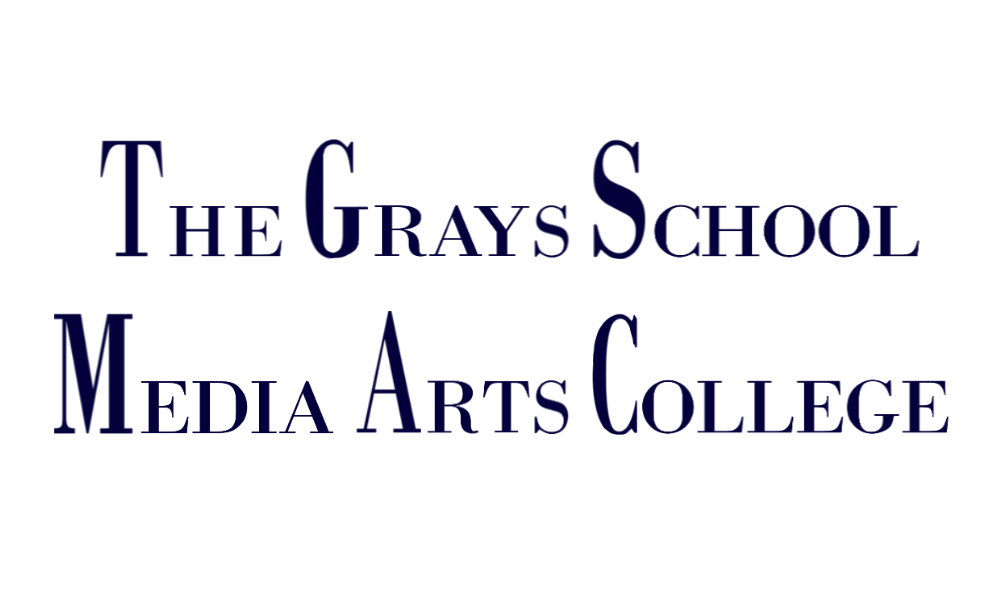
Text logo of the Grays School Media Arts College

By 2007 the Grays School Media Arts College (TGSMAC or Grays School) had a controversial reputation in the local community due to a history with students' behaviour and grades. This culminated in 2007 when incidents occurred within and in relation to the school, leading to intervention by OFSTED and Thurrock Council.

In May 2007, a fight between two 11-13-year-old students broke out in the school playground; onlookers cheered on and no staff could be found. Videos of the fight were twice uploaded to YouTube but were removed. In response, Headteacher Graham Winter said he knew "nothing" about the fight and law enforcement urged the school to "look into matters and report any assault to us so that we can put an end to this violence". The same month, another incident occurred and a TGSMAC pupil was threatened at knife-point, and police had to intervene again. These incidents were brought to the attention of OFSTED, which undertook took a surprise inspection of the school in June. The inspection showed the school upheld outdated academic policies, underachieved in core subjects and had failed to provide adequate religious education.

In September 2007, the school was placed into special measures and faced threats of closure after an OFSTED report of the June Inspection brought to light many problems with the school. Teachers were criticised for inadequate teaching, having low expectations in lessons and failing to mark books over several months, though it was noted pupils' behaviour had improved and was deemed "satisfactory". The pupils attained the only "2" or "good" rating for the school within the report.

This improvement in behaviour was temporary; in January 2008, pupils' behaviour in the school was rated as "poor" by OFSTED, which made an interim inspection earlier that month and criticised the school's lack of progress. The school was also said to have been "overgenerous" in its self-appraisal. In March that year, Thurrock Council announced the resignation of headteacher Graham Winter, who was replaced with two trouble-shooting headteachers who were brought in from Middlesbrough and Hendon on March 10 as part of the school's recovery plan. These two headteachers were replaced by Deputy Head Tim Rider, who became acting head, with John Marchant becoming sole deputy.

==== Rider's reforms and leaving special measures ====
Under Tim Rider, the school began a process behavioural and structural reform, which was praised by OFSTED after their July 2008 Inspection, which noted the school was now considered satisfactory in most areas. Rider attributed the improvements to a new school ethos of togetherness, which included the implementation of policies focused on improving pupil behaviour and happiness. Pupils were encouraged to "take ownership of their school", pupil work parties were formed and a new school motto "Do Your Best Today, For A Better Tomorrow" was introduced. Other schools in Thurrock, including Ockendon School, Gable Hall, and William Edwards, supported and helped implement the reforms. The headteachers of these schools provided assistance to Rider and his administration.

In September 2008, Lynn Ibeji took over from Tim Rider as headteacher in a permanent capacity and continued his policies, and the school was taken out of special measures on 8 October 2009. Also in 2009, the school attained the highest average GCSE results for Year 11 in its history. Despite this, the school's results were behind those of The Gateway and Ormiston Park academies. Ibeji left the school in May 2012. Deputy Head John Marchant became acting headteacher.

==== Transition to academy ====
In July 2012, acting Headteacher Marchant announced Grays School Media Arts College intended to become an academy, a plan that had been in place since at least 2008, The school's governing board made the decision unanimously, with the Academy Transformation Trust sponsoring its conversion in a bid for it to achieve outstanding status, the highest OFSTED rank. It was announced PE teacher James Howarth, former associate principal at Harris Academy Peckham and Harris City Academy, and the former deputy head at Eastlea Community School in East London, would be principal of the new academy.

In a questionnaire on the school website four names were proposed for the new academy: Goliath Academy (referencing the ship), Gower Academy (referencing Cyril Gower from the 1939 Spitfire incident), Thors Oak Academy (referencing the association to the name Thurrock) and Tamesis Academy (Latin name for the River Thames which flows through the Grays area). The deadline for the vote was 30 April 2013.

The school closed for a final time on 30 June 2013; the new Hathaway Academy began operations on 1 July 2013, in preparation for the beginning of the 2013-2014 academic year.

=== Hathaway Academy ===
In April 2014 celebrity actor Russell Brand, whose hometown is Grays and attended Grays School as a teenager, visited the academy whilst filming a documentary. During his visit, Brand visited a drama lesson for 20 minutes; he gave analysis and feedback then stepped on stage and gave a rendition from Bugsy Malone, in which he acted in a Grays School production. Brand was disappointed to learn the school no longer had a library, and funded the building a new one. At an event at the Institute of Education Brand said; "It's a disgrace that a state school doesn't have a library funded by the state, what's going on?", referring to Hathaway Academy.

Russell Brand and Principal James Howarth

In June 2014, Principal Howarth was diagnosed with lymphoma and took an almost-year-long leave of absence. Fatima Rodrigues overtook his duties as acting principal until September 2014, when a new interim principal, Alan Osborne, was appointed. Howarth returned as principal in April 2015 after interim Principal Dave Lee-Allan left for Stowmarket High School. From December 2015, Howarth worked part-time, taking multiple leaves of absences for the treatment of his returning lymphoma.

In June 2015, OFSTED categorised Hathaway Academy as "good", reaffirming this status with a short inspection in 2018.

After his cancer returned again, James Howarth announced he was stepping down from his post as principal in September 2017, appointing acting Principal Fatima Rodrigues as the new principal from November. Before leaving, Howarth gave a final speech to the staff and pupils in which he stated; "I am going to say thank you and farewell ... I made you all a promise of becoming outstanding and I am stepping off the bus before our journey is complete. I am genuinely so so so sorry."

In January 2020, the school was forced to enter a state of lockdown after 2 boys were seen chasing another boy with a knife shortly before the school was due to close that day. No-one was harmed and the school returned to normal the next day.

In March 2020 the school closed due to the COVID-19 pandemic and moved to online learning via Microsoft Teams. The school reopened in September 2020 but closed again soon after due to a rise of cases in the school. The school again reopened on March 8, 2021, in accordance with government guidelines.

== Governance ==
Like most academies in England, Hathaway Academy is run by an academy trust: the Academy Transformation Trust. Day-to-day school administration is run by a senior leadership team consisting of the associate principals, vice principals and the head principal. There is also a local academy committee made up of governors who scrutinise the senior leadership team and are permitted to intervene in administration should the school's standards decline.

There is also a leadership team made up of pupils who applied in Year 9 as apprentices. It has three ranks through which pupils can advance as they age: Year 9 and 10 apprentices, Year 11 prefects and head boy and head girl.

== House system ==
=== Grays School Media Arts College ===
The Grays School Media Arts College introduced a house system consisting of four colleges (houses, three junior and one senior; these were named Tate, Chaucer, Holmes and Puttnam. Puttnam was named after Lord David Puttnam, the school's main sponsor in its bid to become an arts college. The colleges were split between KS3 with Year 10 and the senior Year 11; at Year 11, students would leave their college and enter Puttnam, the senior college. The colleges aimed to create a family environment and were intended to recognise every student, not deterring them from making mistakes. There was also a fifth house named Austen.

=== Hathaway Academy ===
In September 2013, Principal James Howarth introduced a new "faculty system" for the Hathaway Academy. The school is segregated into three faculties (houses), each of which is represented by a colour; these are Purpose (red), Engagement (yellow) and Self-Worth (green). Pupils are placed into one of the faculties on their first day and the school's departments are divided between them. For example, Engagement contains the maths department and Self-Worth contains the science department.

== Admissions ==
The Grays County Technical High School was selective and required all applicants to pass the 11-plus exam.

The Hathaway Academy is coeducational and comprehensive, meaning pupils of both sexes are admitted and are not restricted by academic achievement or aptitude. The school is supported by four feeder schools in the local area. The Grays School Media Arts College was also coeducational and comprehensive, but offered boarding to its students. As a state school, all admissions to the school are free of charge.

The school's admissions policy is dictated by the Academy Transformation Trust in coordination with Thurrock Council. Once the school's pupil admission number (PAN) is oversubscribed, applicants are preferred if they fall under the following factors by order of priority:

- Looked after children/previously looked after children (supported by or in the care of the local authority which in this case is Thurrock Council).
- Current pupils' siblings (has to live at the same address with a common parent to qualify).
- Children of permanent staff members at the Hathaway who have served for more than two years.
- Children attending Academy Transformation Trust primary schools or attending feeder schools (has to be attending at the time of the application).
- Children living closest to the school (measured at a straight-line distance from the school to the address stated and based on the school's catchment area).

Children who have been allocated to attend the Hathaway Academy by the government due to special needs or an education, health and care plan must by law be approved by the school. Should two or more students tie for the school's final spare slot after over-subscription, their names will be placed in a hat and selected by someone independent of the school or trust's staff. Qualifying siblings of current pupils bypass this process and are all admitted together. Applicants who are denied a place are placed onto a waiting list and can enrol to the school should a place be opened. Alternatively, they can appeal to an "independent appeals panel". Children can also apply mid-way through the academic year and will be placed onto the same waiting list as those applicants who were denied.

== Extracurricular activities ==
=== Grays School ===
In the early 2000s, Grays School offered pupils out-of-hours extracurricular activities; this included fishing and Warhammer gaming. The school also offered to hold support classes for parents, in which finance management and desktop publishing were taught. There were also clubs for chess, Spanish, MFL, PE, science and drama. The music department provided music lessons for £13.50 a term and instruments could be hired for £5. The department also had a jazz band and a vocal group, both of whom performed at local primary schools, school concerts, school assemblies and a local IKEA shop.

From 25 to 27 April 2003, the school held a "Craft for a Cause" workshop to support its bid to become a specialist school. Contests were held, and pupils and parents were invited to a silent auction. A raffle was also held, the proceeds of which were donated to the specialist school initiative.

In 2007, TGSMAC hosted Grays Youth Theatre, which held classes every Wednesday evening. From 6 October, Grays Youth Theatre established two drama groups in preparation for a play that was to be showcased in June 2008, and offered sessions for 6-13-year-olds in one of the school's demountables. In 2011, TGSMAC collaborated with the Royal Opera House to provide a drama workshop over the Easter holidays.

=== Hathaway Academy ===
Hathaway Academy provides out-of-hours clubs such as DnD and Creative writing and pupils are allowed to participate in school productions for music, art, drama and media. The school also provides after-school football sessions via its partnership with West Ham United F.C. The school also hosts a church called the Proclaimer's Sanctuary.

== Campus ==
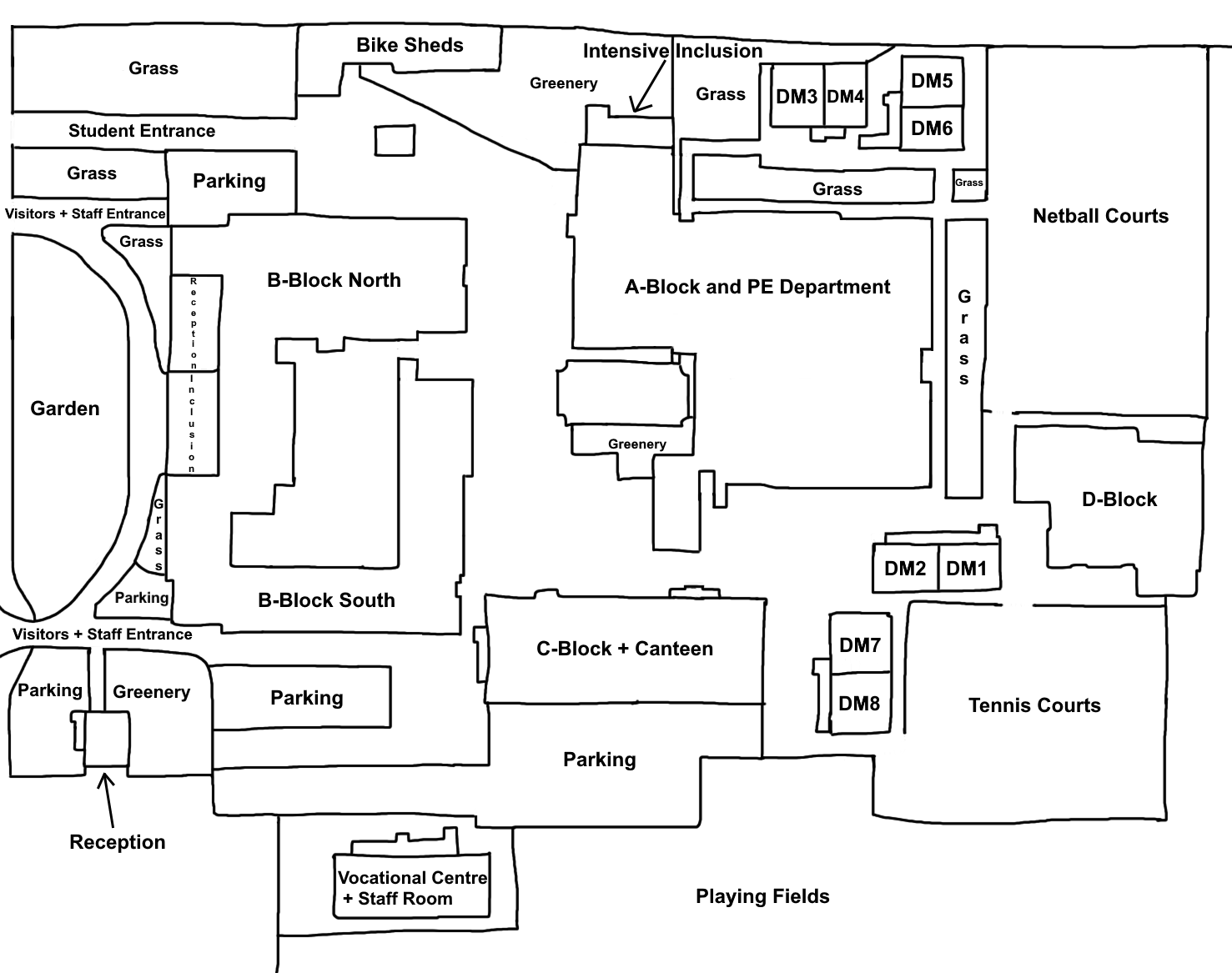
Map of the Hathaway Academy

Hathaway Academy occupies five building blocks and the PE department. There is an assembly hall, a library and a vocational centre. The school reception was relocated to the front of one of the buildings in a bid to make the school more inviting. The school also has a car park, a visitors' entrance and a pupil reception entrance.

The school's main building was constructed in 1932. This building is centred around a quad, which is surrounded by the school's technology and maths blocks. In June 2015, after a period of deterioration, this quad was renovated with foliage and a new garden, which was complemented by an adjoining repaint. The school had previously failed to maintain the quad after some years of underfunding.

In 2013, Grays School began demolishing old, disused demountables and replacing them with a new building in preparation for academy status. Once complete, the building would house two food technology rooms and become part of the school's D-block. Hathaway Academy was renovated in early 2015; according to the Principal James Howarth; "It's a complete transformation. A building that looked completely unattractive is now one where children comment regularly that they feel happier coming to school, and that environment is where learning and progress happens without any question of a doubt. This is amazing." Since then, more renovations have been done to make safe dangerous asbestos panelling within its buildings. The asbestos panels were encased in aluminium to mitigate the risks of exposure and contamination.

A house owned by the school's old caretaker is rented to its teachers. In October 2017 ten teachers jointly rented the house.

The school is located on Hathaway Road and Grays railway station is nearby. It also neighbours a large council estate.

== Awards and recognition ==
In 1996, Grays School was awarded Investors in People, which it retained in 1999 and 2002. Hathaway Academy has held the Diversity Mark Gold award for some time, and was last assessed for retainment in November 2020, and Gold status was confirmed in December 2020. In 2019, the academy signed an "agreement of affiliation" with the Grays branch of the Royal British Legion. This was likely a reaction to the school's 15-year record of collecting the most donations to the Poppy Appeal in the area.

=== Teaching awards ===
In 2016, business studies teacher Emma Hughes was awarded at the House of Commons for her "outstanding contribution to the academy". Her award was presented by Member of Parliament John Spellar.

=== Notable visitors ===
In 1993 the Grays School began inviting high-profile guests and organisations to visit the school and present awards. This tradition was continued by the Hathaway Academy. Some noteworthy visitors such as Russell Brand visit on their own volition.

==== Grays School ====
- Lord David Puttnam
- Lord John Petre, 18th Baron Petre
- Lord Alfred Dubs
- Baroness Angela Smith of Basildon
- Olympic gold medallist Louis Attrill
- Lloyd Scott
- Hastings College Nebraska
- Jackie Doyle-Price

==== Hathaway Academy ====
- Russell Brand
- Channel 5
- Sir Jack Petchey and his Jack Petchey Foundation
- Jermaine Jenas
- Teach First
- Gareth Thomas
- Polly Billington
- Emma Freud
- John Spellar

== Notable former pupils ==
=== Grays School ===
- Russell Brand (1986–1991), Hollywood actor, comedian and the divorcee of Katy Perry.

=== Hathaway Academy ===
- Emmanuel Temitayo Oyinbo-Coker (2013-2018), 2022 Commonwealth Games Gold Medallist.

== Headteachers and deputy heads ==
=== Headteachers and principals ===
Below is a list of the known headteachers and principals of the many iterations of the school. Due to the undocumented nature of much of the school's history it is likely that some heads and principals are missing.

Headteachers and principals
Years	Name	Information
1945–1957	Cyril Baggs	Cyril Baggs was headmaster of Grays County Technical from 1945 until 1957 when he left to become first head of Fryerns School in Basildon.
1968–1971	Frederick F. Harsant	Harsant was the only headmaster of the Aveley and Grays Technical High School until its separation in 1971. He went on to become head of Palmer's College after it amalgamated with Aveley Technical.
???–2002	James John Henry Winstone	Winstone was the headteacher of Grays School by 1995, likely leaving in 2002.
2003–???	Mark Griffin	Griffin became the headteacher of Grays School in 2003 and led the school's bid to specialise in March of that year.
	Graham Winter	Winter was the headteacher of Grays School Media Arts College.
2008	Robert Dawe and David Fuller (co-heads)	Dawe of the Unity Academy, Middlesbrough, and David Fuller of Hasmonean High School, Hendon, were briefly co-heads as part of TGSMAC's recovery plan. They both left the school not long after.
	Tim Rider	Deputy head Rider became acting head of the school after the departure of Robert Dawe and David Fuller. He returned to his post as deputy head in 2008 upon the appointment of a permanent headteacher.
2008–2012	Lynn Ibeji	Ibeji joined Grays School as headteacher in September 2008, replacing acting head Tim Rider.
2012–2013		Marchant became acting headteacher of TGSMAC after Ibeji's sudden resignation in May 2012 and oversaw the school's transition into an academy. He taught at the school since at least 1992.
	James Howarth (First term)	Howarth was appointed the first principal of the Hathaway Academy.
2014	Fatima Rodrigues (First term)	Hathaway vice principal since April 2014, Rodrigues became Hathaway Academy's acting principal after James Howarth's leave of absence until the end of the academic year in mid-July.
2014	Alan Osborne	Osborne was interim principal of the Hathaway Academy from the beginning of the 2014–2015 academic year but left before 2015.
2015	Dave Lee-Allan	Lee-Allan became Hathaway's interim principal by January 2015.
2015–2017	James Howarth (Second term)	After his successful recuperation James Howarth returned to the Hathaway Academy as principal in April 2015, expecting to serve at a full-time capacity. He resigned and retired in September 2017.
2017–present	Fatima Rodrigues (Second term)	Fatima Rodrigues took over Howarth's duties as principal during his sporadic absences post-2015 and, once he fully retired, became permanent principal in November 2017.
