= New Me (disambiguation) =

"New Me" is a 2024 song by Japanese duo Yoasobi.

New Me may also refer to:

- "New Me" (Ella Eyre song), 2020
- "New Me" (Flo Milli song), 2024
- "The New Me" (Big Mouth), a 2020 television episode
- "The New Me" (Miranda), a 2010 television episode
