= Roger Wrightson =

English cricketer

Personal information
- Full name: Roger Wilfred Wrightson
- Born: 29 October 1939; Elsecar, Yorkshire, England
- Died: 13 September 1986 (aged 46); Carlisle, Cumberland, England
- Batting: Left-handed
- Role: Occasional wicket-keeper

Domestic team information
- Years: Team
- 1970–1971: Cumberland
- 1965–1967: Essex

Career statistics
Competition	First-class
Matches	12
Runs scored	332
Batting average	20.75
100s/50s	–/1
Top score	84
Balls bowled	–
Wickets	–
Bowling average	–
5 wickets in innings	–
10 wickets in match	–
Best bowling	–
Catches/stumpings	8/–
- Source: Cricinfo, 11 October 2011

Roger Wilfred Wrightson (29 October 1939 – 13 September 1986) was an English cricketer. Wrightson was a left-handed batsman who occasionally fielded as a wicket-keeper.

Although born in Elsecar, Yorkshire to Frederick Liddell Wrightson and Jessie Arline Hague, Wrightson was raised in Essex where his family moved to when his father took up a teaching position in the county. It was in Grays that he was educated at Palmer's School, going from there to Loughborough University. His father first introduced Wrightson to cricket when he was a child, according to Wrightson had made him, along with his brothers bat as left-handers. Prior to playing county cricket he became a primary school teacher in Thurrock.

He eventually made his debut for Essex in a first-class match against Oxford University in 1965, with him making nine further first-class appearances in the 1965 season. Against Warwickshire that season at Clacton, Wrightson scored 84 runs, which was to be his only first-class half century. Later that season when playing against Yorkshire he had his two front teeth knocked out by a bouncer delivered by Fred Trueman. He made no appearances for Essex in 1966, with his teaching career taking precedence. He did appear in two first-class matches in the 1967 season against Derbyshire and Hampshire, and was at the end of that season offered a new contract by Essex, but decided not to accept the offer. In his brief first-class career, Wrightson scored 332 runs at an average of 20.75.

He and his wife Audrey, who was an art teacher, moved to Cumberland shortly thereafter. He played in the Minor Counties Championship for Cumberland, making his debut for the county in 1970 against the Yorkshire Second XI. He played for Cumberland in 1970 and 1971, making nine Minor Counties Championship appearances. Wrightson died at Carlisle, Cumberland on 13 September 1986, aged 46. He was survived by his wife Audrey, son Michael and daughter Anna.
