= Nicholas Farrell =

English actor

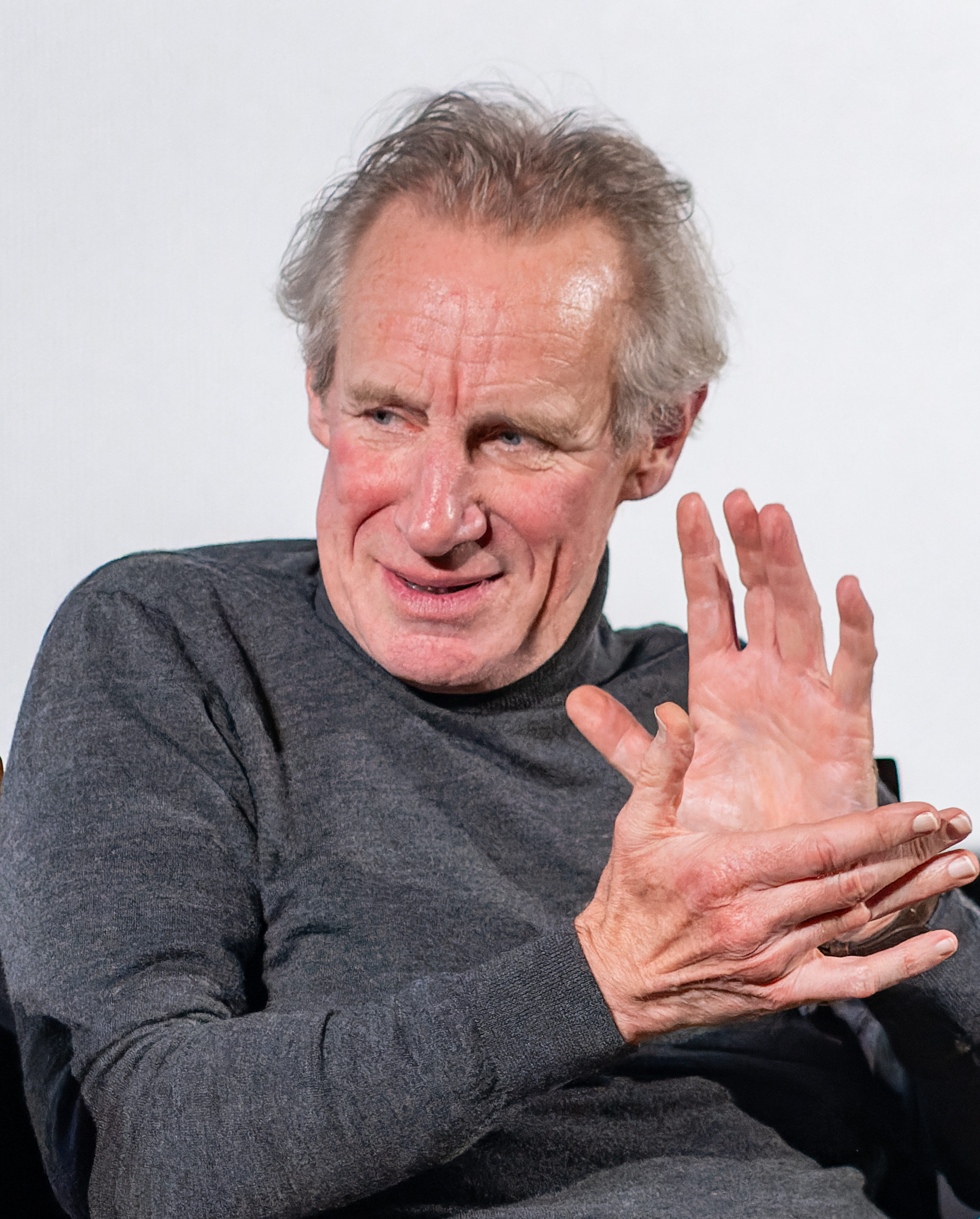
- Farrell in 2023
- Born: Nicholas C. Frost; 1955 (age 70–71); Brentwood, Essex, England
- Education: Fryerns Grammar School; Bristol Old Vic Theatre School
- Occupation: Actor
- Years active: 1975–present
- Spouse: Stella Gonet (m. 2005)
- Children: 1

Nicholas C. Frost (born 1955), known professionally as Nicholas Farrell, is an English stage, film and television actor.

== Early life ==
Farrell was born in Brentwood, Essex. He was educated at Fryerns Grammar and Technical School in Basildon, Essex, He studied acting at the Bristol Old Vic Theatre School.

== Life and career ==
Farrell's early screen career included the role of Aubrey Montague in the 1981 film Chariots of Fire. In 1983, he starred as Edmund Bertram in a television adaptation of the Jane Austen novel, Mansfield Park. In 1984, he appeared in Greystoke: The Legend of Tarzan, Lord of the Apes, and The Jewel in the Crown.

Since then, his film and television work has included several screen adaptations of Shakespeare's works, including Kenneth Branagh's 1996 Hamlet, in which he played Horatio, a role he had played previously with Branagh for the Royal Shakespeare Company. He has also appeared in film adaptations of Twelfth Night (1996), Othello (1995) and In the Bleak Midwinter (1995). He provided the voice of Hamlet for the animated television adaptation Shakespeare: The Animated Tales (1992).

In 2009, he played the role of Albert Dussell in the BBC series The Diary of Anne Frank. In 2011, he played Margaret Thatcher's close friend and advisor Airey Neave in The Iron Lady.

In 2014, he portrayed Eyre Crowe in the British documentary drama miniseries 37 Days, about the weeks leading up to World War I. Other television appearances have included two Agatha Christie's Poirot films, Sharpe's Regiment, Lipstick on Your Collar, To Play the King, Roman Mysteries, Torchwood, and Collision. He has also appeared in episodes of Lovejoy, Foyle's War, Absolute Power, Spooks, Midsomer Murders, Drop the Dead Donkey, Call the Midwife, and Casualty. He also voiced the Golem Pump 19 in the 2010 two-part adaptation of Terry Pratchett's Going Postal.

Farrell's theatre work includes performances of The Cherry Orchard, Camille, and The Crucible, as well as Royal Shakespeare Company productions of The Merchant of Venice, Julius Caesar, and Hamlet. In the 2011 Chichester Festival he played schoolmasters Dewley and Crocker-Harris in the double bill of South Downs and The Browning Version. In 2021 he played Ebenezer Scrooge in A Christmas Carol: A Ghost Story at Nottingham Playhouse.

In 2014, Farrell starred in the Grace Kelly biopic Grace of Monaco alongside Nicole Kidman and Tim Roth, and the short film The Pit and the Pendulum: A Study in Torture, based on Edgar Allan Poe's short story. He played the spy Guy Burgess in Alan Bennett's play An Englishman Abroad in a 2016 tour of the play, presented with Bennett's A Question of Attribution in a double bill titled Single Spies.

In 2020, he starred as the racehorse trainer in the Welsh film Dream Horse, alongside Toni Collette, Damian Lewis, and Owen Teale.

In 2021 he was chosen as the face of the Saga plc television campaign 'Experience is Everything'.

He is married to Scottish actress Stella Gonet, and they have a daughter, Natasha.

== Selected film and television appearances ==
=== Film ===
- Chariots of Fire (1981) as Aubrey Montague
- Greystoke: The Legend of Tarzan, Lord of the Apes (1984) as Sir Hugh Belcher
- Playing Away (1987) as Derek
- In the Bleak Midwinter (US title A Midwinter's Tale) (1995) as Tom Newman (Laertes, Fortinbras, and messengers)
- Othello (1995) as Montano
- Twelfth Night, or What You Will (1996) as Antonio
- Hamlet (1996) as Horatio
- The Treasure Seekers (1996) as Bastable
- Gator King (1997) as Henchman
- Legionnaire (1998) as Mackintosh
- Plunkett & Macleane (1999) as M.P.s Secretary
- Beautiful People (1999) as Dr. Mouldy
- Pearl Harbor (2001) as RAF Squadron Leader
- The Discovery of Heaven (2001) as Mr. Quist (uncredited)
- Arthur's Dyke (2001) as Geoffrey
- Charlotte Gray (2001) as Mr. Jackson
- Bloody Sunday (2002) as Brigadier Patrick Maclellan
- The Third Wave (2003) as Frank Devlin
- Red Mercury (2005) as Minister
- Driving Lessons (2006) as Robert Marshall
- Amazing Grace (2006) as Henry Thornton
- Late Bloomers (2011) as Francis
- The Iron Lady (2011) as Airey Neave
- Summer in February (2011) as Mr. Carter Wood
- Grace of Monaco (2014) as Jean-Charles Rey
- Testament of Youth (2014) as Headmaster
- Robot Overlords (2014) as Sentry Robot / Air Drone (voice)
- Mortdecai (2015) as Auctioneer
- Legend (2015) as Dr Humphries
- Remainder (2015) as Daubenay
- Tear Me Apart (2015) as Old Man (voice)
- Altamira (2016) as Vilanova
- Mindhorn (2016) as Mayor
- Jack the Ripper: The London Slasher (2016) as Samuel Harris
- Another Mother's Son (2017) as De La Haye
- Hurricane (2018) as Sir Hugh Dowding
- The Coldest Game (2019) as Griswald Moran
- Dream Horse (2020) as Philip Hobbs
- Widow Clicquot (2023) as Jean-Remy Moet

=== Television ===
- Matador (1981) as Jim Donaldson
- The Agatha Christie Hour: "The Manhood of Edward Robinson" (1981) as Edward Robinson
- Berlin Tunnel 21 (1981) as Georg
- Mansfield Park (1983) as Edmund Bertram
- The Jewel in the Crown (1984) as Teddy Bingham
- Fools on the Hill, (1986), David
- Casualty: "Facing Up" (1991) as Phil Byron
- Lovejoy: "The Italian Venus" (1991) as Douglas Holden
- Agatha Christie's Poirot: "The A.B.C. Murders" (1992) as Donald Fraser
- Shakespeare: The Animated Tales: "Hamlet" (1992) as Hamlet (voice)
- The Riff Raff Element (1993)
- Lipstick on Your Collar (1993) as Maj. Church
- To Play the King-second part of the House of Cards (UK) trilogy (1993) as David Mycroft
- MacGyver: "Trail to Doomsday" (1994) as Paul Moran
- Bramwell (1995) as Major Stuart Hyde
- The Choir (1995) as Leo Beckford
- Sharpe's Regiment (1996) as Lord Fenner
- Drop the Dead Donkey: "Dave and Diana" (1996) as Martin Jones
- Sex, Chips & Rock n' Roll (1999) as Howard Brookes
- Midsomer Murders: "Strangler's Wood" (1999) as John Merrill
- The Jury (2002) as Jeremy Crawford (Juror #5)
- Sparkhouse (2002) as Paul Lawton
- Spooks: "The Rose Bed Memoirs" (2002) as Richard Maynard
- Absolute Power: "Mr Fox" (2003) as Simon Wellington
- Foyle's War, "The Funk Hole" (2003) as Chief Inspector James Collier
- Trial & Retribution VIII: "Blue Eiderdown" (2004) as Jonathan Southwood MP
- Agatha Christie's Poirot: "The Mystery of the Blue Train" (2005) as Major Knighton
- Jericho: "To Murder and Create" (2005) as Charles Hewitt
- Casualty 1906 (2006) as Sydney Holland
- Persuasion (2007) as Mr. Musgrove
- Criminal Justice (2007) as painter
- The Inspector Lynley Mysteries: "Limbo" (2007) as Sam Oborne
- Casualty 1907 (2008) as Sydney Holland
- A Touch of Frost: "Mind Games" (2008) as Simon Slater
- Casualty 1909 (2009) as Chairman Sydney Holland
- The Diary of Anne Frank (2009) as Mr. Dussell
- Torchwood (2009) as Prime Minister Brian Green
- Collision (2009) as Guy Pearson
- Lewis (2010) as Professor Milner
- New Tricks (2011) as James Winslow
- Death in Paradise (2011) as Nicholas Dunham
- Secret State (2012) as General
- Spying on Hitler's Army: The Secret Recordings (2013) as Wilhelm Ritter von Thoma
- 37 Days (2014) as Eyre Crowe
- Call the Midwife (2014) as Charles Newgarden, episode 4.2
- Father Brown (2015) as Sir Raleigh Beresford, episode 3.2 The Curse of Amenhotep
- Thirteen (2016) as Henry Stone
- Siblings (2016) as Charles
- The Crown Series 4 (2020) as Michael Shea (Episode 8)
- Silent Witness Series 24:6 (2021) as Professor Adrian Cowley
- Gentleman Jack (2022) as John Waterhouse Sr.
- Signora Volpe Series 2:3 & 2:4 (2024) as Sylvia Fox's long-lost father Henry Fox in "A Deadly Net"
- The Count of Monte Cristo (2024) as Pierre Morrel
- Prisoner 951 (2025) as John Ratcliffe
