= Fryerns Comprehensive School =

Fryerns School

Location
- Craylands; Basildon, Essex, SS14 3RN; England; 51.577°N 0.487°E

Information
- Type: Secondary school
- Motto: Latin: Age Quod Agis ("If you do something, do it well.") Motto on Fryerns pulpit in hall "Labor omnia vincit"
- Established: 1956
- Closed: 1999
- Local authority: Essex
- Department for Education URN: 115224 Tables
- Ofsted: Reports
- Headteacher: Cyril Baggs (First); David A. Anderson (Last)
- Gender: Mixed
- Age: 11 to 18
- Colour: Blue/yellow
- Publication: Fryern' Easy
- Former name: Fryerns Grammar and Technical School, Craylands County Secondary
- Fate: Closed in 1999
- Website: http://atschool.eduweb.co.uk/fryerns/index.html

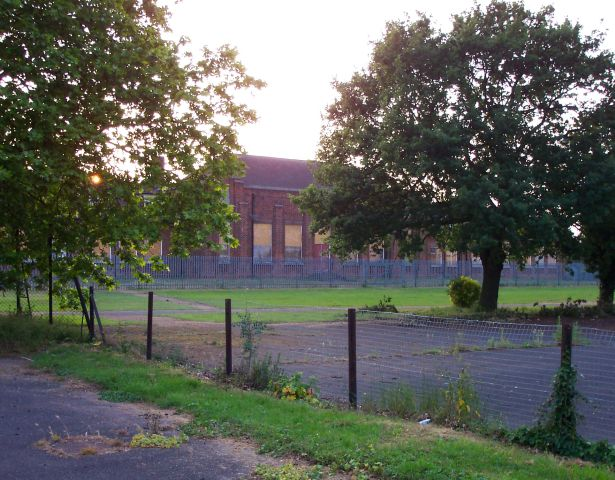
Craylands School, built in 1935. Taken in 2007 by Paul Francis.

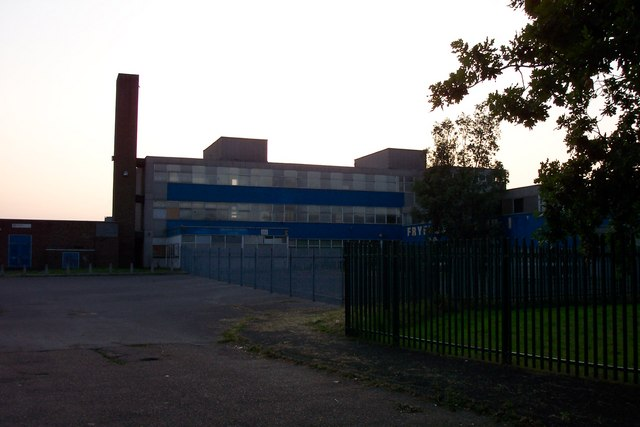
Fryerns School. 2007 by Paul Francis.

Fryerns Comprehensive School /friːəns/, also known as Fryerns Community School, was a mixed intake secondary school in Basildon, Essex that opened in 1956. The school was situated around one mile directly east of Basildon town centre. It was closed in 1999 due to falling pupil numbers. Part of the site is now home to both Essex County Council's Adult Community Learning service and Social Services, with the remaining land having been redeveloped into two housing estates.

== History ==
Fryerns School was the first new secondary school to be opened in Basildon New Town. Its name came from the nearby Fryerns Farm which also provided the name for the local area.

Fryerns was created as a Grammar and Technical school. In August 1968, it merged with Craylands County Secondary school, which had opened on the same site in 1935, to create Fryerns Comprehensive. The influx of families into the area meant that another secondary school, Barstable, was placed across the road. In 1994, the school changed its name once again to Fryerns Community School.

Essex County Council Education department closed Fryerns in 1999 due to falling pupil numbers and a serious funding issue. Basildon's demographics had changed markedly over the previous four decades. A rapidly ageing population meant that there were too many schools in the district for the number of pupils and Fryerns had to close. Fryerns, had been threatened with closure in 1990–91 but a strong defence of the school was launched in parliament by the then Basildon Conservative MP David Amess. In the speech he stated that no school would close in Basildon while he was its member of parliament. This turned out to be the case as in 1997, he did not contest the Basildon seat as the New Labour candidate Angela Smith MP was elected. Less than two years later the school had closed.

After closing, the newer school buildings to the south of the site were taken over by Essex Social Services and the playing fields next to it were used for a new housing estate. The school buildings and fields of the old Craylands school were left derelict. Eventually the buildings were demolished and work was started on another new estate.

== School traditions and achievements ==
- Perridge Awards – These were medals awarded for consistent effort, progress and conduct. They were awarded in three categories, bronze, silver and gold.
- Cake Competition – An annual five-a-side football knockout competition. If a class played a team from the year above they would get a two goal head start. So if a year 11 team played a year 7 team the match would start at 10 – 0. The prize was a large cake produced by the Home Economics department.
- Skiing trip to Villach, Austria was organised annually for pupils in years 8 and 9.
- In 1987 the sculptor Sokari Douglas Camp was artist-in-residence at the school. Her piece “mother and child” was on display in the entrance hall.

== Headteachers ==
Below is a list of all the headteachers in the school's history.

- Cyril Baggs - Left as head of Grays County Tech to become first appointed head in 1957.
- Sydney Hopewell - Became head in April 1969 after Baggs' departure.
- Ken Hunter - Took over the headship from Hopewell in September 1974.
- Mr. Turner - Became acting head in August 1980 after Hopewell left. He took charge to the end of the year.
- Timothy F. Slater - Was appointed headteacher in January 1981 through to August 1994.
- Bob Plimmer - Became acting head for the following autumn term after Slater's resignation.
- Stuart Hayes - Took over in January 1995.
- David A. Anderson - Took charge for the school's final year until it closed on 31 August 1999.

== Notable former pupils ("Fryernists") ==
- Graham Bonney - singer (chart hit with "Super Girl" in 1966)
- Nicholas Farrell - actor
- Aden Hynes Sculpture Studios - Sculptor
- Jillean Porter, former England Netball Captain and winner of 100 international caps.
- Jon Robson - golfer

== Badge ==
The school's badge is a stag lying in a laurel wreath. This denotes peace, harmony and triumph.
