= Yxng Bane =

British rapper and singer (born 1996)

- Born: Guystone Menga; 12 April 1996 (age 30); Custom House, London, England
- Genres: British hip hop; R&B; afroswing; pop
- Occupations: Rapper; singer; songwriter
- Instrument: Vocals
- Years active: 2016–present
- Label: Disturbing London
- Website: www.yxngbanemusic.com

Guystone Menga, known professionally as Yxng Bane (pronounced "young bane"), is an English rapper, singer and songwriter.

== Early and personal life ==
Born Guystone Menga, Yxng Bane grew up in Custom House, an industrial district of East London's Canning Town neighbourhood. His mother is Congolese and his father is Angolan. He has five siblings and attended Eastlea Community School in Canning Town and later attended Palmers college in Grays, Essex. He is an avid supporter of Arsenal F.C.

== Career ==
Yxng Bane started his musical career in 2016, by uploading songs onto his SoundCloud account. In January 2016, he released his debut EP, Full Moon. In January 2017, Bane was featured on a remix of Ed Sheeran's hit single "Shape of You". In June 2017, he was featured on the single "Bestie" by rapper Yungen, which peaked at number 10 on the UK Singles Chart.

== Artistry ==
Bane has cited Michael Jackson, Drake, Future, PartyNextDoor, 50 Cent, Tinie Tempah and Wizkid as his influences. While talking about his musical style in an interview with Billboard, he said; "In terms of music and artistry, I'm an artist who doesn't belong to a genre. I express myself however I need to express myself. Whether I need to rap about it or sing about it, however, I need to deliver the message, it will be delivered. In terms of genre, I think – no, it's not "I think." I know I don't belong to any genre because, for example, I'll do the "Rihanna," which is a slow, afroswing vibe and then I go and do "Froze," which is more the trap sound – more U.K. drill sound. So it's more about however I need to express it rather than belonging to a genre. It's more – I'm diverse."

== Discography ==
=== Collaborative mixtapes ===
List of collaborative mixtapes, with selected details
Title	Details	Peak chart positions	Certifications
Title	Details	UK	Certifications
Any Minute Now (with D-Block Europe)	Released: 20 July 2018; Label: Self-released; Format: Digital download, streaming	14	BPI: Silver

=== Mixtapes ===
List of mixtapes, with selected details
Title	Details	Peak chart positions
Title	Details	UK
HBK	Released: 9 November 2018; Label: Disturbing London; Format: Digital download, streaming	36
Quarantime: The Lost Files	Released: 1 May 2020; Label: Disturbing London; Format: Digital download, streaming	11

=== Extended plays ===
List of extended plays, with selected details
Title	Details
Full Moon	Released: 21 January 2016; Label: Self-released; Format: Digital download, streaming
Before I Explain	Released: 28 August 2026; Label: Winners Globe Entertainment; Format: Digital download, streaming

=== Singles ===
==== As lead artist ====
List of singles as lead artist, with selected chart positions, showing year released and album name
Title	Year	Peak chart positions		Certifications	Album
Title	Year	UK	UK R&B	Certifications	Album
"Should've Known Better"	2016	—	—		Non-album singles
"Fine Wine" (featuring Kojo Funds)	2016	—	—	BPI: Platinum	Non-album singles
"Diamonds" (featuring K-Trap)	2017	—	—		Non-album singles
"Rihanna"	2017	40	14	BPI: Platinum	Non-album singles
"Parking Spot" (with Cadenza and Shenseea)	2017	—	—		Non-album singles
"Froze"	2017	—	—		Non-album singles
"Corner" (featuring Maleek Berry)	2018	—	—		Non-album singles
"Vroom"	2018	27	15	BPI: Platinum	Non-album singles
"Both Sides"	2018	—	—		Non-album singles
"Makasi" (featuring Franglish)	2018	—	—		Non-album singles
"Gucci Mane" (with D-Block Europe)	2018	49	32	BPI: Silver	Any Minute Now
"16 Steps" (with Martin Jensen & Olivia Holt)	2018	—	—		Non-album single
"Needed Time"	2018	51	20	BPI: Silver	HBK
"Problem" (featuring Fredo)	2018	75	24		HBK
"Intro (Big Wave)" (with Young Chencs)	2019	—	—		Non-album singles
"How It Is" (with Roddy Ricch and Chip featuring The Plug)	2019	18	—	BPI: Silver	Non-album singles
"Skrr" (featuring OFB)	2019	74	—		Non-album singles
"Maximum"	2019	—	—		Non-album singles
"Gang S**t"	2020	—	—		Non-album singles
"Bando Aspen" (with GeeYou)	2020	—	—		Non-album singles
"Section"	2020	—	—		Quarantime: The Lost Files
"Are You Mad" (featuring K-Trap)	2020	66	—		Quarantime: The Lost Files
"Cut Me Off" (featuring D-Block Europe)	2020	65	—		Non-album singles
"Dancing on Ice" (featuring Nafe Smallz and M Huncho)	2021	45	—		Non-album singles
"Nice to Meet Ya" (with Wes Nelson)	2021	33	—	BPI: Silver	Non-album singles
"Pénélope" (with Franglish and D-Block Europe)	2021	—	—		Non-album singles
"Birthday" (featuring Stefflon Don)	2021	—	—		Non-album singles
"Bruk Down" (featuring DoRoad)	2022	—	—		Non-album singles
"City Girls/Trackstar" (with D-Block Europe)	2024	—	—		Non-album singles
"—" denotes a recording that did not chart or was not released in that territory.

==== As featured artist ====
List of singles as featured artist, with selected chart positions, showing year released and album name
Title	Year	Peak chart positions			Certifications	Album
Title	Year	UK	UK R&B	IRE	Certifications	Album
"Balenciaga" (Dr. Vades featuring Yxng Bane, Kojo Funds and Don Elito)	2015	—	—	—		Non-album singles
"Honest" (JSTJCK featuring Yxng Bane)	2017	—	—	—		Non-album singles
"Bestie" (Yungen featuring Yxng Bane)	2017	10	2	69	BPI: Platinum	Non-album singles
"No Way" (Crazy Cousinz featuring Yxng Bane, Mr Eazi and Lily Mckenzie)	2017	—	—	—		Non-album singles
"When Ur Sober" (Tayá featuring Yxng Bane)	2017	—	—	—		Tayá
"Forever" (Sigma featuring Quavo, Tinie Tempah, Yxng Bane and Sebastian Kole)	2017	—	—	—		Non-album singles
"Answerphone" (Banx & Ranx and Ella Eyre featuring Yxng Bane)	2018	5	—	10	BPI: Platinum	Non-album singles
"Passion 4 Fashion" (Hypo featuring Young Adz & Yxng Bane)	2018	—	—	—		Non-album singles
"Magic" (Craig David featuring Yxng Bane)	2018	—	—	—		The Time Is Now
"Your Lovin'" (Steel Banglez featuring MØ & Yxng Bane)	2018	47	28	—	BPI: Gold	Non-album single
"Creepin Up (The Come Up)" (Remedee featuring Kojo Funds, Yxng Bane & Masicka)	2018	—	—	—		Golden Boy
"Flair" (A2 featuring Octavian, Yxng Bane & Suspect)	2018	—	—	—		Non-album singles
"More Muni" (90Bagz featuring Yxng Bane)	2018	—	—	—		Non-album singles
"Santo Domingo" (Dopebwoy featuring Yxng Bane)	2019	—	—	—		Forever Lit
"Really Love" (KSI featuring Tinie Tempah, Craig David and Yxng Bane)	2020	—	—	—		TBA
"Nice to Meet Ya" (Wes Nelson featuring Yxng Bane)	2021	33	—	63		TBA
"Winners" (Smoko Ono featuring Yxng Bane, Chance the Rapper & Joey Purp)	2021	—	—	—		TBA
"—" denotes a recording that did not chart or was not released in that territory.

=== Other charted and certified songs ===
List of other charted and certified songs, showing year released, and album name
Title	Year	Peak chart positions	Certifications	Album
Title	Year	UK	Certifications	Album
"Cocktail" (with D-Block Europe)	2018	—	BPI: Silver	Any Minute Now
"Rock Bottom" (with M Huncho)	2019	80		Utopia
"Fake Love" (Nafe Smallz featuring Yxng Bane)	2019	74		Good Love
"Pretty Little Nike Airs" (with D-Block Europe)	2019	—	BPI: Silver	PTSD
"Table for Two"	2020	100		Quarantime: The Lost Files
"—" denotes a recording that did not chart or was not released in that territory.

=== Guest appearances ===
List of guest appearances, showing year released, other artists and album name
Title	Year	Other artist(s)	Album
"Ciao Bella"	2016	Footsteps	The Intent (Original Motion Picture Soundtrack)
"Dun Talkin'" (Remix)	2016	Kojo Funds, JME, Frisco, Fredo	Non-album remix
"Top Floor"	2017	NEW GEN	New Gen
"Shape of You" (Yxng Bane Remix)	2017	Ed Sheeran	Non-album remix
"Break-Fast"	2017	Wretch 32, Avelino	FR32
"Solo" (Yxng Bane Remix)	2018	Clean Bandit, Demi Lovato	Non-album remix
"This Week"	2018	Headie One	The One Two
"Rock Bottom"	2019	M Huncho	Utopia
"Fake Love"	2019	Nafe Smallz	Good Love
"Faith In My Killy"	2020	GRM Daily, Nafe Smallz, Blade Brown, Skrapz	GRM 10
"Really Love (Digital Farm Animals Remix)"	2020	KSI, Craig David, Tinie Tempah, Digital Farm Animals	Non-album remix
"Pink Lemonade"	2024	D-Block Europe	Rolling Stone

== Filmography ==
Year	Title	Role	Notes
2018	The Intent 2: The Come Up	Cameo	
2018	HBK: The Prequel	Himself	Starring role

== Awards and nominations ==
Year	Organization	Award	Nominated work	Result
2017	MOBO Awards	Best Song	"Rihanna"	Nominated
2017	MOBO Awards	Best Newcomer	Himself	Nominated
2018	BBC	Sound of 2018	Himself	Nominated
2018	MTV	Brand New For 2018	Himself	Nominated
2018	NME Awards	Best Collaboration	"Bestie" (with Yungen)	Nominated
