= Rihanna (Yxng Bane song) =

Single by Yxng Bane
- Released: 14 August 2017
- Genre: R&B, afroswing
- Length: 3:27
- Label: Disturbing London
- Songwriters: Gordon Egwu; Guystone Menga; Uzezi Oniko
- Producer: Legendury Beatz

Yxng Bane singles chronology
"Diamonds" (2017)	"Rihanna" (2017)	"No Way" (2017)

"Rihanna" is a song by British rapper Yxng Bane. It was released as a single through Disturbing London on 14 August 2017, peaking at number 40 on the UK chart. The song was written by Gordon Egwu, Bane and Uzezi Oniko, and produced by Legendary Beats.

== Track listing ==
Digital download
No.	Title	Length
1.	"Rihanna"	3:27

== Charts ==
Chart (2017)	Peak position
UK Hip Hop/R&B (OCC)	14
UK Singles (OCC)	40

== Certifications ==
Region	Certification	Certified units/sales
New Zealand (RMNZ)	Gold	15,000^{‡}
United Kingdom (BPI)	Platinum	600,000^{‡}
^{‡} Sales+streaming figures based on certification alone.
