= Ormiston Park Academy =

Coordinates: 51.5046°N 0.2512°E

Park Academy

Location
- Belhus Park Lane; Aveley, Essex, RM15 4RU; England

Information
- Type: Academy
- Motto: Believe and Achieve
- Established: August 2009
- Local authority: Thurrock
- Trust: Community Schools Trust
- Department for Education URN: 135960 Tables
- Ofsted: Reports
- Principal: Munira Said
- Executive Principal: Jodie Hassan
- Gender: Mixed
- Age: 11 to 16
- Enrolment: Approx. 710 as of 2023
- Capacity: 1100
- Website: www.parkacademycst.org

Park Academy, formerly the Ormiston Park Academy and Belhus Chase Specialist Humanities College, is now a secondary school and academy located in Aveley, Essex, England. The school was reformed as an academy in 2009 under the sponsorship of the Ormiston Academies Trust and the new building was designed by Nicholas Hare Architects and completed in Spring 2014.

== History ==
The then Aveley County Technical High School first opened its doors in 1957 and originally had a capacity of 660 students. It amalgamated with the Grays County Technical High School in Grays, Essex to form the Aveley and Grays Technical High School in 1968. The Headmaster of the merged school was Frederick F. Harsant. The merger between the two schools discontinued when the Grays campus was taken over by the Grays Park School in 1971 and the Aveley Technical closed a year later when it amalgamated with the Palmer's Boys' and Girls' Schools to form Palmer's College.

In 1976 the Aveley School, located in Love Lane, relocated to the former Aveley Technical site. By 2004 it was called the Aveley Secondary School and in 2007 the school specialised as the Belhus Chase Specialist Humanities College. The Headteacher at the time was Tess Walker. In 2009 the school closed at the end of the August 31 school day, reopening the next day as Ormiston Park Academy. Tess Walker became Principal of the new academy and she left in 2014, being replaced by Huw Derrick. Derrick was Deputy Head since 2004 and announced his retirement in 2019, being replaced by Mark Roessler at the beginning of the 2020–2021 academic year.

In 2023, Roessler was replaced by Vice Principal Humayun Rashid, who then left in 2024.

He was replaced by Munira Said and Jodie Hassan, as part of a wider partnership with the Unity School’s Trust and interference from the board.

In late 2025, It was announced that the Ormiston Academies Trust had given up funding of the school, with views sought on the academy moving to the Unity Schools Partnership, after what they described, had already been two years of excellent joint collaboration.

On October 1st 2026, Ormiston Park Academy made the transition from being apart of the Ormiston Academies Trust, to being apart of the Community School Trust (Cst) along with a name change to Park Academy.

== Ofsted judgements ==
The school was inspected by Ofsted in 2017, when it received a judgement of good. It had previously been rated as requires improvement.

In 2023, the school retained its judgement of good.

In 2024, the school was inspected again and downgraded to requires improvement.
