= Vroom (song) =

Single by Yxng Bane
- Released: 16 March 2018
- Genre: R&B, afroswing
- Length: 3:41
- Label: Disturbing London
- Songwriter(s): Desmond Child; Tarik Collins; Moses Davies; Emmanuel Ezeonyebuchi; Jeremy Harding; Sean Henriques; Guystone Menga; Glenard Patnelli; Troy Rami; Robi Rosa; Gabriel Wood
- Producer(s): Team Salut

Yxng Bane singles chronology
"Corner" (2018)	"Vroom" (2018)	"Answerphone" (2018)

"Vroom" is a song by British rapper Yxng Bane. It was released as a single through Disturbing London on 16 March 2018, peaking at number 27 on the UK chart. A remix, featuring Jamaican reggae and dancehall singer Beenie Man, was released on 25 May 2018.

The song was written by Desmond Child, Tarik Collins, Moses Davies, Emmanuel Ezeonyebuchi, Jeremy Harding, Sean Henriques, Guystone Menga, Glenard Patnelli, Troy Rami, Robi Rosa and Gabriel Wood, and produced by Team Salut.

== Track listing ==
Digital download
No.	Title	Length
1.	"Vroom"	3:41

Benny Benassi remix
No.	Title	Length
1.	"Vroom" (Benny Benassi Remix)	4:11

James Hype remix
No.	Title	Length
1.	"Vroom" (James Hype Remix)	3:17

T. Matthias remix
No.	Title	Length
1.	"Vroom" (T. Matthias Remix)	4:00

Beenie Man remix
No.	Title	Length
1.	"Vroom" (with Beenie Man)	3:41

== Charts ==
Chart (2018)	Peak position
UK Hip Hop/R&B (OCC)	15
UK Singles (OCC)	27

== Certifications ==
Region	Certification	Certified units/sales
United Kingdom (BPI)	Platinum	600,000^{‡}
^{‡} Sales+streaming figures based on certification alone.
