= Ella Eyre =

English singer and songwriter (born 1994)

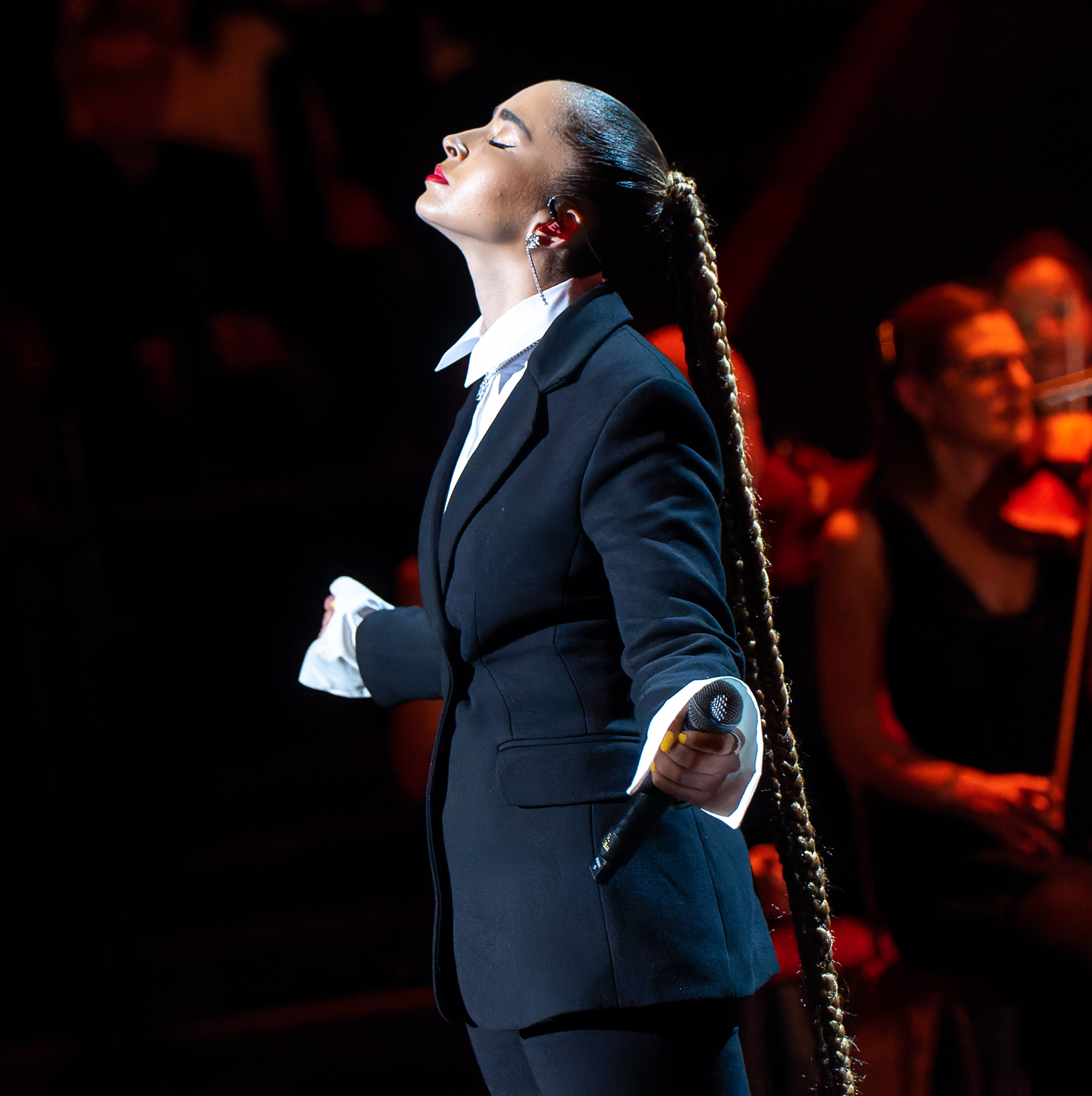
- Eyre at the Royal Albert Hall in 2022

Background information
- Genres: R&B; pop; neo soul; EDM; drum and bass
- Occupations: Singer; songwriter
- Years active: 2012–present
- Labels: Virgin EMI (former); Island (former); Universal; UMG (UK)
- Website: ellaeyreiam.com

Ella Eyre is an English singer and songwriter. She rose to prominence following her collaboration with Rudimental on their UK number-one single "Waiting All Night" (2013), which won the Brit Award for British Single of the Year. She also featured on DJ Fresh's single "Gravity" (2015). She was the runner-up for the 2014 Brit Critics’ Choice Award and is known for her work in dance-pop and soul-influenced music.

Eyre released her debut extended play, Deeper, in 2013, which included the single "If I Go", her first solo top 20 entry on the UK Singles Chart. Her debut studio album, Feline, followed in 2015, and reached the top five of the UK Albums Chart and features the singles "Comeback" and "Together". Following a hiatus during which she underwent vocal cord surgery in 2020 and had to relearn how to speak and sing, she transitioned to working as an independent artist and released her second studio album, Everything, in Time, in November 2025 through PIAS Recordings.

== Early life and education ==
Ella Eyre was raised in Ealing, London. Her father was Jamaican and her mother is Maltese. Her father was a chef who lived in Jamaica and was unable to move to the UK with the rest of his family due to limited economics and her mother, who raised Eyre in London, is a cake designer. Eyre trained as a competitive swimmer before she began singing professionally.

Eyre was educated at Millfield School, a public school in Somerset. Refuting the idea that she came from a privileged background, she observed that her mother could not have afforded the fees, and she went there on a "massive swimming scholarship". She later attended the BRIT School for Performing Arts and Technology, where she studied musical theatre. Discovered by her management through a vocal coach in 2011, she juggled school with songwriting. She signed to the publisher Warner Chappell Music in July 2012 and a record deal with Virgin EMI followed shortly after, aged 16.

== Music career ==
In December 2012, Eyre featured on Bastille’s cover and mash-up of TLC's "No Scrubs" and the xx's "Angels", titled "No Angels", which appeared on the band’s 2012 mixtape, Other People's Heartache, Pt. 2. In April 2013, she featured on drum and bass band Rudimental's single "Waiting All Night", which peaked at number one on the UK Singles Chart, becoming Eyre’s first chart entry. In August 2013, Eyre appeared alongside rapper Wiz Khalifa on the track "Think About It" from producer Naughty Boy’s 2013 album Hotel Cabana. The song was released as the fourth single from the album in November 2013. She also featured on rapper Tinie Tempah's album Demonstration on the track "Someday (Place in the Sun)", which entered the UK Singles Chart at number 87. Eyre’s first extended play (EP), Deeper, was released in December 2013, and the title track reached number 72. She was the runner-up for the 2014 BRIT Critics’ Choice Award and came second on the BBC Sound of 2014 shortlist. "Waiting All Night" also won the Brit Award for British Single of the Year that year. Her next three solo singles — "If I Go", "Comeback" (both 2014) and "Together" (2015) — reached the top twenty on the UK Singles Chart. She co-wrote the UK number one single "Changing" for drum and bass duo Sigma featuring Paloma Faith, released in September 2014. In October 2014, Eyre won Best Newcomer at the MOBO Awards 2014. In 2015, Eyre featured on DJ Fresh’s single "Gravity" and co-wrote "Black Smoke", performed by Ann Sophie at the Eurovision Song Contest 2015 for Germany. She supported Olly Murs on his arena tour and was announced as the face of Emporio Armani Diamonds.

Her debut album, Feline, was released in August 2015, following the single "Good Times", and featured contributions from Wayne Hector, Ilya, Paul O’Duffy and Jarrad Rogers. In September 2015, Eyre released a cover of "Swing Low, Sweet Chariot" in association with England Rugby for the 2015 Rugby World Cup. In November, she won Best Female at the MOBO Awards 2015. She then embarked on a UK tour.

=== 2017–present: Everything, in Time ===
On 18 February 2017, Eyre announced her comeback concert at KOKO in London, which took place on 4 April 2017. At the concert, she performed four new songs: "LOV(E)", "Drink with Your Name on It", "I Swear" and "Ego". On 29 May 2017, Eyre and Sigala announced their collaborative single "Came Here for Love", which was released on 9 June 2017. Two months later, she released "Ego" featuring Ty Dolla $ign. She then supported Little Mix on their Summer Shout Out Tour and the Script on their Freedom Child Tour in early 2018. In February 2018, Eyre participated in the 2018 Great Stand Up to Cancer Bake Off. On 5 March 2018, she released "Answerphone" with Banx & Ranx and Yxng Bane, which peaked at number 5 on the UK Singles Chart. On 7 September 2018, Eyre collaborated again with Sigala on "Just Got Paid", featuring Meghan Trainor and French Montana, which reached number 11 in the UK. In July 2019, Eyre signed with Island Records and released the single "Mama" featuring Banx & Ranx and Kiana Ledé. In January 2020, she released "New Me", followed by a UK tour in November and December. Following “New Me”, Eyre released several singles before issuing her third EP, Quarter Life Crisis, in August 2020. During the COVID-19 lockdowns, Eyre underwent vocal surgery that required her to relearn how to speak. After recovering with a clearer sense of self, she parted with Island Records, took ownership of her masters and scrapped all of her unreleased music. Eyre later restarted work on her second studio album, explaining that an earlier iteration did not feel right. In November 2023, she released "Head in the Ground", her first independent single. After several single releases, her second studio album, Everything, in Time, was released on 21 November 2025.

== Personal life ==
From 2015 to 2017, Eyre was in a relationship with Lewi Morgan of the British pop rock band Rixton. In April 2017, her father passed away. She revealed that she suffered from a kidney infection and a severe shellfish allergy during the filming of her "New Me" music video, which caused facial swelling and discharge. In interviews, she has stated that she prefers to keep her current relationships private and is cautious about discussing her romantic life publicly.

== Discography ==
- Feline (2015)
- Everything, in Time (2025)

== Tours ==
Headlining:

- Feline Tour (2014–2015)
- 2021 UK Tour (2021)

Supporting:

- Never Been Better Tour (2015) (Olly Murs)
- Summer Shout Out (2017) (Little Mix)
- Freedom Child Tour (2018) (The Script)

== Awards and nominations ==
Year	Organisation	Category	Nominated work(s)	Result	Ref.
2014	MTV	Brand New for 2014	—	Nominated	
2014	BRIT Awards	Critics' Choice	—	Nominated	
2014	BRIT Awards	Single of the Year	"Waiting All Night"	Won	
2014	BBC	Sound of 2014	—	Second place	
2014	MOBO Awards	Best Newcomer	—	Won	
2014	MOBO Awards	Best Female	—	Nominated	
2015	BRIT Awards	British Single of the Year	"Changing" (with Sigma)	Nominated	
2015	MOBO Awards	Best Female	—	Won	
2017	UK Music Video Awards	Best Pop Video – UK	"Came Here for Love" (with Sigala)	Nominated	
2018	UK Music Video Awards	Best Dance Video – UK	"Answerphone" (with Banx & Ranx)	Nominated	
2020	The Global Awards	Best Female	—	Nominated	
2020	The Global Awards	Best British Act	—	Nominated	
2020	Popjustice £20 Music Prize	Best British Pop Single	"New Me"	Nominated	
