= Eastlea Community School =

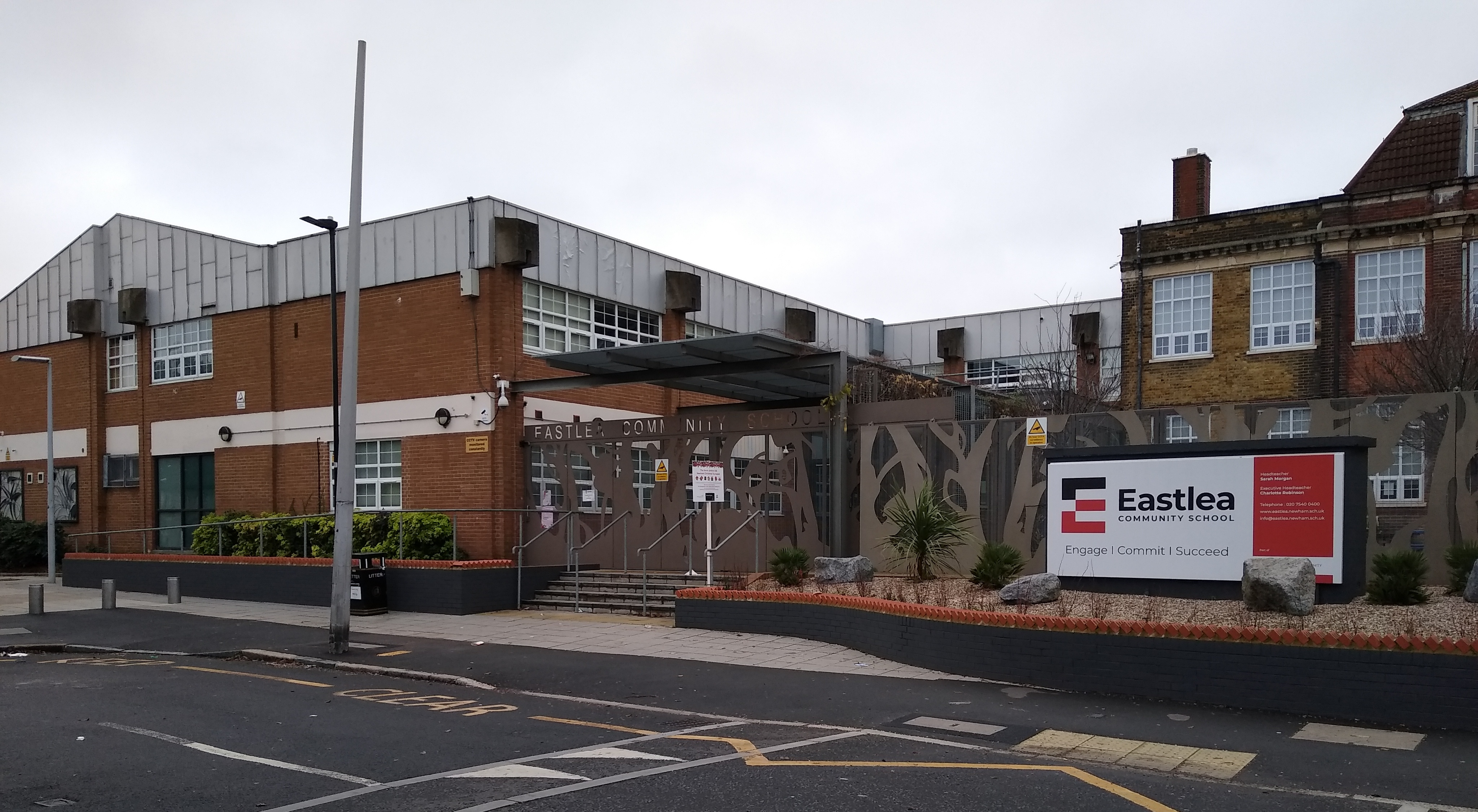

Location
- Pretoria Road; Canning Town, London, E16 4NP; England
- Coordinates: 51.5227°N 0.0095°E

Information
- Type: Academy
- Local authority: Newham
- Trust: Newham Community Schools Trust
- Department for Education URN: 148224 Tables
- Ofsted: Reports
- Head Of School: Sarah Morgan
- Gender: Co-educational
- Age: 11 to 16
- Colours: Black and White
- Website: https://www.eastlea.newham.sch.uk/

Eastlea Community School is a co-educational secondary school in the London Borough of Newham in Canning Town, London E16. The school caters for 11- to 16-year-olds.

The school runs a scholarship initiative in partnership with charity Eastside Young Leader Academy.

Eastlea Community School underwent an extensive £13m Building Schools For the Future redevelopment creating a campus-style learning environment.

Previously a community school administered by Newham London Borough Council, in January 2021 Eastlea Community School converted to academy status. The school is now sponsored by the Newham Community Schools Trust.

== Notable former pupils ==
- Frank Lampard Sr, footballer
- J Hus, Musician
- Yxng Bane, Musician
- Teddy Music (Silencer), Musician
