= Gravity (DJ Fresh song) =

Single by DJ Fresh featuring Ella Eyre
- Released: 7 February 2015
- Recorded: 2014
- Genre: Drum and bass; soul
- Length: 3:17 (radio edit)
- Label: Ministry of Sound; Polydor
- Songwriters: Dan Stein; Ella McMahon
- Producer: DJ Fresh

DJ Fresh singles chronology
"Flashlight" (2014)	"Gravity" (2015)	"Believer" (2015)

Ella Eyre singles chronology
"Comeback" (2014)	"Gravity" (2015)	"Together" (2015)

Music video
- "Gravity" on YouTube

"Gravity" is a song by DJ Fresh, an English drum and bass producer and DJ, released as the fifth single from Fresh's forthcoming fourth studio album. It was released on 7 February 2015 in the United Kingdom. The song features English recording artist Ella Eyre. The song also features on Eyre's debut studio album Feline (2015).

== Music video ==
The music video is shot in Tucson, Arizona by Madoff Productions. It features DJ Fresh and Eyre driving in the car while police chase them.

== Track listing ==
Digital download – single
No.	Title	Length
1.	"Gravity" (Radio Edit)	3:17
2.	"Gravity" (Zeds Dead Remix)	5:25
3.	"Gravity" (Roska Remix)	4:37
4.	"Gravity" (Erik Arbores Remix)	4:52
5.	"Gravity" (VIP Edit)	4:46
6.	"Gravity" (DJ Marky Remix)	4:40
7.	"Gravity" (Extended Mix)	4:29

== Charts ==
=== Weekly charts ===
Chart (2015)	Peak position
Belgium (Ultratop 50 Flanders)	16
Belgium (Ultratip Bubbling Under Wallonia)	2
Ireland (IRMA)	67
Netherlands (Single Top 100)	93
Poland (Polish Airplay New)	5
Scotland Singles (Official Charts)	5
UK Dance (Official Charts)	1
UK Indie (Official Charts)	1
UK Singles (Official Charts)	4

=== Year-end charts ===
Chart (2015)	Position
Belgium (Ultratop 50 Flanders)	92
UK Singles (OCC)	70

== Certifications ==
Region	Certification	Certified units/sales
United Kingdom (BPI)	Platinum	600,000^{‡}
^{‡} Sales+streaming figures based on certification alone.

== Release history ==
Country	Release date	Format	Label
United Kingdom	8 February 2015	Digital download	Polydor Records
