= Feline (Ella Eyre album) =

Studio album by Ella Eyre
- Released: 28 August 2015
- Recorded: 2014–15
- Genre: Pop; soul; R&B
- Label: Virgin EMI
- Producer: Jarrad Rogers; Ilya; Oscar Görres; DJ Fresh; Sigma; Sigala; Future Cut; Chris Young; Alex Smith; Mark Taylor; Jeremy Wheatley; Two Inch Punch; Chris Loco; Greg Wells; Adam Pallin; Dave Tozer; Utters; Jay Reynolds; Steve Robson; Mike Spencer; Paul Staveley O'Duffy; Jonny Lattimer; Nikolaj Bjerre; Starsmith; Michael Harwood; Sean Hargreaves

Ella Eyre chronology
Ella Eyre (2015)	Feline (2015)	Quarter Life Crisis (2020)

Singles from Feline
- 1. "If I Go" Released: 13 July 2014; 2. "Comeback" Released: 28 September 2014; 3. "Together" Released: 17 May 2015; 4. "Good Times" Released: 21 August 2015

Professional ratings
Review scores
Source	Rating
Renowned for Sound	3.5/5 stars

Feline is the debut album by the English singer Ella Eyre. It was released on 28 August 2015 through Virgin EMI Records. The album was produced by Jarrad Rogers, Dave Tozer, Ilya, Oscar Görres, Alexander Kronlund, DJ Fresh and Sigma. It was preceded by the UK top-twenty singles "If I Go", "Comeback" and "Together".

== Promotion ==
=== Singles ===
"If I Go" was released as the album's lead single on 13 July 2014. It peaked at number 16 on the UK Singles Chart. "Comeback" was released on 28 September 2014 as the album's second single. The song reached number 12 on the UK Singles Chart. The third single, "Together", was released on 17 May 2015 and reached number 12 in the UK. "Good Times" was released as the fourth single from the album on 21 August 2015, and peaked at number 37 on the UK Singles Chart.

Additionally, two other songs off the album were released as singles – "Deeper" was released on 15 December 2013, charting at number 72 in the UK, while "Gravity" was released on 8 February 2015 as a single from DJ Fresh's upcoming fourth studio album and reached number four on the UK Singles Chart.

=== Tour ===
There were three legs to Eyre's Feline Tour.

Date	Country	City	Venue	Support acts
Tour 1
12 March 2014	England	London	XOYO	Javeon; Jake Isaac
13 March 2014	England	Brighton	The Haunt	Javeon; Jake Isaac
14 March 2014	England	Birmingham	Temple	Javeon; Jake Isaac
16 March 2014	Scotland	Glasgow	King Tut's	Javeon; Jake Isaac
17 March 2014	England	Leeds	Cockpit 2	Javeon; Jake Isaac
18 March 2014	England	Nottingham	Bodega	Javeon; Jake Isaac
20 March 2014	England	Bristol	Exchange	Javeon; Jake Isaac
21 March 2014	England	Manchester	Deaf Institute	Javeon; Jake Isaac
Tour 2
1 October 2014	England	Birmingham	O2 Institute Birmingham	Seinabo Sey; Joel Baker
3 October 2014	England	Leeds	Stylus	Seinabo Sey; Joel Baker
5 October 2014	England	Newcastle	Newcastle University Students' Union	Seinabo Sey; Joel Baker
6 October 2014	Scotland	Glasgow	O2 ABC Glasgow	Seinabo Sey; Joel Baker
7 October 2014	England	Manchester	O2 Ritz Manchester	Seinabo Sey; Joel Baker
9 October 2014	England	Sheffield	Plug	Seinabo Sey; Joel Baker
10 October 2014	England	London	O2 Shepherds Bush Empire	Seinabo Sey; Joel Baker
12 October 2014	Wales	Cardiff	Solus	Seinabo Sey; Joel Baker
13 October 2014	England	Bristol	O2 Academy Bristol	Seinabo Sey; Joel Baker
15 October 2014	England	Bournemouth	O2 Academy Bournemouth	Seinabo Sey; Joel Baker
16 October 2014	England	Norwich	The Waterfront	Seinabo Sey; Joel Baker
20 October 2014	Ireland	Dublin	The Academy	Seinabo Sey; Joel Baker
22 October 2014	Northern Ireland	Belfast	Mandela Hall	Seinabo Sey; Joel Baker
Tour 3
3 November 2015	England	Southampton	O2 Guildhall Southampton	Jasmine Thompson; Flawes
4 November 2015	England	Bristol	O2 Academy Bristol	Jasmine Thompson; Flawes
6 November 2015	England	Manchester	Albert Hall	Jasmine Thompson; Flawes
10 November 2015	England	London	O2 Academy Brixton	Jasmine Thompson; Nina Nesbitt
11 November 2015	England	Birmingham	O2 Academy Birmingham	Jasmine Thompson; Flawes

== Track listing ==
Feline – Standard version
No.	Title	Writer(s)	Producer(s)	Length
1.	"Together"	Ella McMahon; Chris Young; John Martin; Michel Zitron	Future Cut; Young	3:33
2.	"If I Go"	Jarrad Rogers; McMahon; Natalia Hajjara	Rogers	3:03
3.	"Always"	McMahon; Alex Smith; Mark Taylor	Future Cut; Taylor; Smith	3:32
4.	"Good Times"	McMahon; Bruce Fielder; Cameron Edwards; Joe Lenzie	Sigma; Sigala	3:56
5.	"Comeback"	McMahon; Oscar Görres; Ilya Salmanzadeh; Alexander Kronlund	Rogers; Ilya (co.); OzGo (co.); Jeremy Wheatley (add.)	3:22
6.	"Gravity" (DJ Fresh featuring Ella Eyre)	Dan Stein; McMahon	DJ Fresh	3:17
7.	"Deeper"	McMahon; Ben Ash	Two Inch Punch	3:28
8.	"Two"	McMahon; Hajjara; Chris Crowhurst	Chris Loco	3:27
9.	"Even If"	McMahon; Greg Wells	Wells	4:02
10.	"All About You"	McMahon; Adam Pallin	Pallin	3:39
11.	"Home"	McMahon; Paddy Byrne; Matthew Marston; Dan Radclyffe	Dave Tozer; Utters; Jay Reynolds (add.)	3:34
12.	"Alone Too"	McMahon; Wayne Hector; Steve Robson	Robson	3:27
13.	"Worry About Me"	McMahon; Paul Staveley O'Duffy	Mike Spencer; O'Duffy; Future Cut (add.)	3:29
14.	"Typical Me"	McMahon; Jonny Lattimer	Lattimer; Reynolds (add.)	3:06

Feline – Deluxe edition bonus tracks
No.	Title	Writer(s)	Producer(s)	Length
15.	"Waiting All Night" (acoustic)	Rudimental; James Newman; Jonny Harris	Nikolaj Bjerre	3:27
16.	"Don't Follow Me"	McMahon; Hajjara; Fin Dow-Smith	Starsmith; Jay Reynolds (add.)	3:29
17.	"Everyone Goes Your Way"	McMahon; Paul Staveley O'Duffy	O'Duffy	3:32
18.	"We Don't Have to Take Our Clothes Off"	Narada Michael Walden; Preston Glass	Michael Harwood; Sean Hargreaves	3:50

Notes

- The deluxe edition is repackaged into a Digipak.

== Charts ==
Chart (2015)	Peak position
Belgian Albums (Ultratop Flanders)	35
Irish Albums (IRMA)	35
Scottish Albums (OCC)	6
Swiss Albums (Schweizer Hitparade)	70
UK Albums (OCC)	4

== Certifications ==
Region	Certification	Certified units/sales
Denmark (IFPI Danmark)	Gold	10,000^{‡}
United Kingdom (BPI)	Gold	100,000^{‡}
^{‡} Sales+streaming figures based on certification alone.

== Release history ==
Region	Date	Format(s)	Edition(s)	Label	Ref.
United Kingdom	28 August 2015	CD; digital download	Standard; deluxe	Virgin EMI	
