= USP College =

Coordinates: 51.5625°N 0.5835°E

- Essex, RM17 5TD (Palmer's Campus); SS7 1TW (Seevic Campus)

Information
- Type: General further education college
- Motto: Your life Your Career
- Established: 1706 (Palmer's College); 1972 (Seevic College)
- Department for Education URN: 130681 Tables
- Ofsted: Reports
- Principal and CEO: Dan Pearson
- Gender: Co-educational
- Age: 16 to 25+
- Enrolment: 3,588
- Former names: Palmer's College & Seevic College
- Website: https://www.uspcollege.ac.uk/

Unified Seevic Palmer's College, trading as USP College (previously known as Seevic and Palmer's Colleges Group), is a large general further education college in Essex, England. Since 2021, it has been a European Parliament Ambassador School.

USP College was established in August 2017 from the merger of Palmer's College in Grays, Thurrock, and Seevic College in Thundersley, Benfleet, and traces its history back to the establishment of Palmer's as a charity school in 1706. Seevic College was established as a sixth form college in 1972, with Seevic originally being an acronym for South East Essex Sixth (VI) Form College. Seevic and Palmer's now make up two of the college's three campuses, with the XTEND Digital Campus in Canvey Island forming its third campus. There were 3,588 students enrolled to the college as of November 2021.

The Seevic Campus offers adult education courses for learners of any age. Both campuses offer a special needs department for anyone with a learning disability. The Palmer's campus opened its special needs department in September 2018, following the success of the Seevic Campus one which has been running for several years and has over 94 students in the department.

In 2018 Seevic merged with Palmer's College as part of a government initiative. From September 2018 the colleges were renamed USP College with a new logo.

It was announced in March 2019 that USP had purchased local apprenticeship provider ITEC Learning Technologies which would increase the number of apprenticeship training options USP could offer.

== Merging ==
In 2017 it was announced that Palmer's College and Seevic College would merge to make one college, over the year running up to September 2018, both colleges underwent extensive changes. In June 2018 the college was officially renamed USP College. The new name included a new logo and a new look to both campuses. The new college would continue to offer a mixture of Further Education, Adult Education and Higher Education courses.

== Seevic College ==
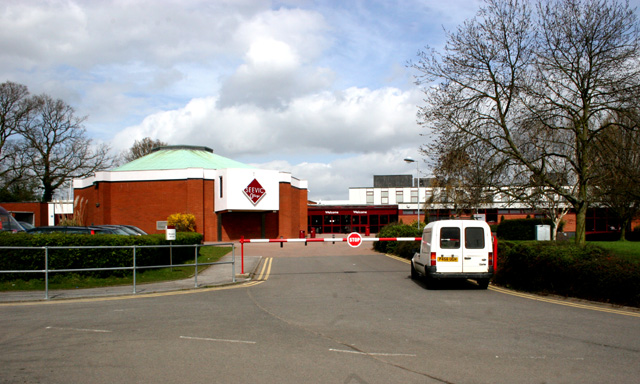
Seevic entrance

SEEVIC College was a Sixth Form college located on the A13 in Thundersley, Essex. It offered a variety of GCSEs, A-Levels and Higher Education courses (in association with The University of Hertfordshire, Writtle University College and The Docklands Academy). This is now the SEEVIC campus of USP College.

=== History ===
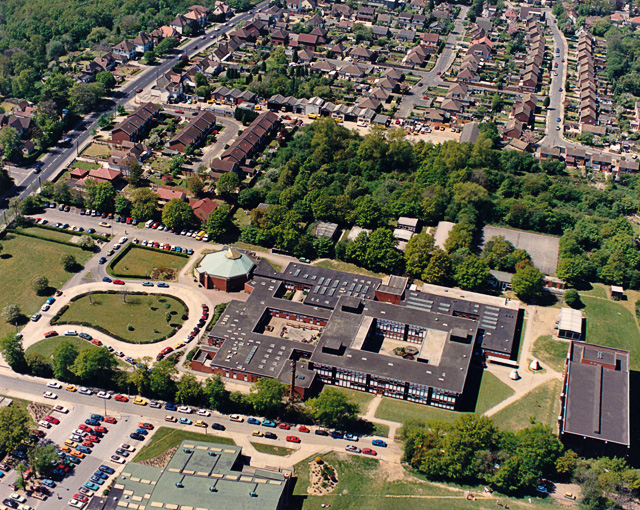
Seevic aerial view in 1987

The name was originally an acronym for South East Essex Sixth (VI) Form College. The College in Thundersley opened in September 1972 and was designed to support 12 partner schools across Castle Point and Rochford districts. During the 1990s the college expanded into the former temporary home of Castle Point Borough Council in a building called the White House, the Training for the Millennium Centre on Canvey and a small centre at the former Park School site in Rayleigh. During the noughties they had planned to expand by knocking both the main site and the White House down and rebuilding.

In 2017 OFSTED rated SEEVIC as requires improvement however, it came third in the national results for GCSE in Maths.

The college offers courses such as performing arts, science, health and social care. Approximately 2,500 students attend the college.

==== New Campus Basildon ====
In 2008 SEEVIC opened a new centre at the Icon in Basildon, named New Campus Basildon in partnership with Prospects College and South East Essex College as part of a government initiative to increase FE provision in the town. In 2011 a second campus was opened at Church Walk, but after the merger of Thurrock and Basildon College with South East Essex College in 2010, the ICON building was closed. New Campus Basildon as an FE centre was closed and it became a Studio school in 2013, with SEEVIC as its main sponsor. SEEVIC withdrew from sponsoring the studio school in 2016 and it closed in 2017.

==== Legal case ====
A construction contract for work at Seevic College undertaken by ISG Construction Ltd., commencing in February 2013, gave rise to a legal ruling on the interim payment provisions in Part 8 of the Local Democracy, Economic Development and Construction Act 2009. When a dispute arose about the value of the work undertaken to date for which the contractor sought interim payment, the College was late in issuing a notice stating that its payment would be less than the contractor had requested. The contractor initiated an adjudication process to resolve the issue of timing, but the College then initiated a second adjudication, asking the same adjudicator to rule on the interim value of the work completed. The judge commented that

the statutory regime would be completely undermined if an employer, having failed to issue the necessary payment or a "pay less notice", could refer to adjudication the question of the value of the contractor's work at the time of the interim application (or some later date) and then seek a decision requiring either a payment to the contractor or a repayment by the contractor based on the difference between the value of the work as determined by the adjudicator and the sums already paid under the contract.

and ruled therefore that the contractor was entitled to payment at the value sought. A slightly later case, Galliford Try Building v Estura Ltd., confirmed this position in relation to interim payments. A further construction case, Harding (t/a M J Harding Contractors) v Paice & Anor, on which the England and Wales Court of Appeal ruled on 1 December 2015, stated that the payment requirement following adjudication, where the employer who had failed to issue a timely "pay less notice", applied to the value of a payment claimed at an interim stage: such payment must be made, allowing the parties to "argue about the figures later". This would not, however, prevent the employer from requesting a further adjudication in order to identify the correct value for the contractor's final account.

=== Notable alumni ===
- Ashley Banjo
- Jordan Banjo
- Emma Blackery
- Bobby Lockwood
- Andrew Zisserman

== Palmer's College ==
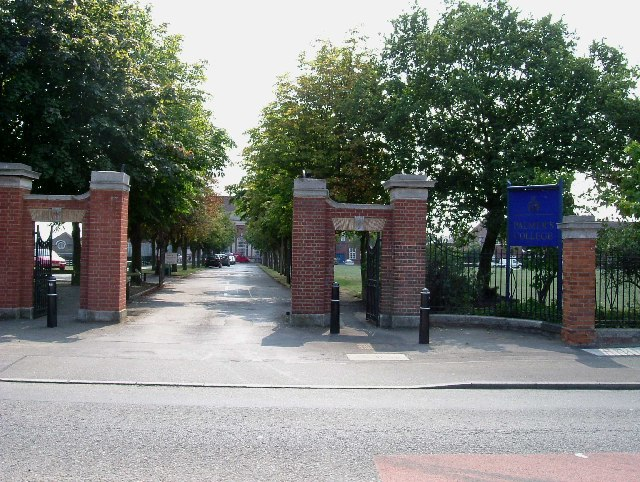
Palmer's entrance

Palmer's College was a sixth form college for 16- to 19-year-olds in Thurrock, Essex, England. It offers a wide range of courses including A-levels, BTECs and Secretarial. It is now one of two campuses of USP College.

=== History ===
Palmer's was first opened in 1706 when the merchant William Palmer founded a charity school for "ten poore children" of the parish of Grays Essex, endowing it with valuable property in the town and Lombard Street in the City of London. Initially located in a small building inside the churchyard the school evolved into a boys' school. However, in response to the changing educational landscape initiated by the Elementary Education Act 1870, the trustees of Palmer's charity re-launched the school on a new site on the hill above the town in 1874. To this a girls' school was added in 1876. The schools were grammar schools for both boys and girls, and William Strang, 1st Baron Strang, perhaps Palmer's most distinguished alumnus, recalled it in 1905 as 'a modest establishment, modest that is in size and in material equipment, but not at all modest in the opinion which it held of itself'. The boys' school which admitted both day pupils and boarders until 1970, achieved the status of a public school in 1931–46. In 1972, as part of the reorganisation of education in Essex, the boys' and girls' schools amalgamated, together with Aveley Technical High School, to constitute a sixth form college. During the mid-1970s, the boys' and Aveley schools relocated to the College's present site (until then occupied by the Girls' School alone). The College was supported by the William Palmer College Education Trust, the direct successor of the trustees William Palmer appointed to administer his charity. Artifacts from the schools' past can be seen in the College library.

A 2007 inspection by Ofsted concluded: "Palmer's is an outstanding college." Student achievement and the standard of work were good and success rates overall 'well above national averages for learners from all backgrounds'. The College was also praised for its retention rates and value-added scores.

In 2013 a subsequent report rated the college as "Requires Improvement" because few students studying academic courses were achieving high grades, there were no consistent standards of teaching, learning and assessment, and the college's leadership had failed to maintain the high standards reached in 2007, with many of the implemented measures, particularly regarding the performance management of teachers, being ineffective.

2008 saw a record number of students applying to the College with over 2000 students enrolling. The College was equipped with modern teaching facilities set in landscaped grounds. Both students and the general public had access to a newly refurbished sports and fitness centre (including gym), Palmer's hosts a variety of events for children from local schools on its playing fields.

The Student Executive were the "voice of the students" within the college; they were responsible for organising various college events. The Student Executive of 2007–2008 raised £4,000 for Little Havens Children's Hospice while the Student Executive of 2008/9 raised £3,000 for Cancer Research UK as well as hosting various social events and fundraising days over the course of the year.

The school had a good record of students attaining places on the prestigious Prime Minister's Global Fellowship programme. The school achieved its first two students in the inaugural year of the programme, 2008. In 2009 it had another successful applicant.

In 2006 Palmer's College celebrated its 300th anniversary.

=== Location ===
The location of Palmer's Campus is situated on Chadwell Road (B149) next to the A1089 just north of the A126 junction (Marshfoot Interchange). It is close to the boundary between Little Thurrock (to the west) and Chadwell St Mary. It is administratively in Thurrock and although its postal address is Grays, it is located in the religious parish of St Mary the Virgin, Little Thurrock.

=== Notable alumni ===
==== Palmer's Grammar School for Boys ====
- Vernon Bell father of British karate
- Duncan Fallowell, author (briefly)
- Guy Holmes (1905–1967), England footballer
- Henry G. Booker, physicist and electrical engineer
- Mick Jackson (director), TV director, directed the 1984 Threads and the 1987 Life Story
- Prof Geoffrey Thorndike Martin, Edwards Professor of Egyptology from 1988 to 1993 at UCL
- Jeremy Fell Mathews Attorney General of Hong Kong from 1988 to 1997
- Anthony Moore (Anthony Michaels-Moore)(1957– ), opera singer
- Paul Skinner, Chairman from 2003 to 2009 of Rio Tinto Group
- William Strang, first Baron Strang (1893–1978), diplomat
- Prof Peter Wadhams, Professor of Ocean Physics since 2003 at the University of Cambridge, and Director from 1987 to 1992 of the Scott Polar Research Institute
- Roger Wrightson (1939–1986), Essex cricketer

==== Palmer's Grammar School for Girls ====
- Jean Lambert (nee Archer), Green MEP 1999-2019 for London
- Emmy Dinkel-Keet, Dutch artist

==== Palmer's College ====
- Jordan Gray, comedian and singer
- Mark-Anthony Turnage (born 1960), composer
- Anne-Marie (Anne-Marie Rose Nicholson; born 1991), singer-songwriter
- Jen Craft, Member of Parliament for Thurrock

=== External links ===
- Old Palmerians' Association
- Contact site for pupils who joined Palmer's Boys School in 1965

== ITEC Learning Technologies ==
Basildon ITEC was formed in 1983 by Malcom Bridges, as a provider of IT training when PC's were in their infancy, and had been influenced by the then education minister Ken Baker. They are located at Burnt Mills, in the former Burnt Mills Primary School building and offer a wide range of IT training including foundation degree courses and apprenticeships.
