= Together (Ella Eyre song) =

Single by Ella Eyre

from the album Feline
- Released: 17 May 2015
- Genre: Drum and bass
- Length: 3:33
- Label: Virgin EMI
- Songwriter(s): Ella McMahon; John Martin; Michel Zitron; Chris Young
- Producer(s): Chris Young; Michel Zitron

Ella Eyre singles chronology
| "Gravity" (2015) | "Together" (2015) | "Good Times" (2015) |

Music video
- "Together" on YouTube

"Together" is a song by English singer Ella Eyre. It was released on 17 May 2015 as the third single from her debut studio album Feline. The song was written by Ella McMahon, John Martin, Chris Young and Michel Zitron. The song peaked at number 12 on the UK Singles Chart.

== Music video ==
A music video to accompany the release of "Together" was first released onto YouTube on 14 April 2015 at a total length of three minutes and thirty-nine seconds.

== Track listing ==
Digital download
| No. | Title | Length |
|---|---|---|
| 1. | "Together" | 3:33 |

== Chart performance ==
| Chart (2015) | Peak position |
|---|---|
| Belgium (Ultratip Bubbling Under Flanders) | 6 |
| Belgium Dance (Ultratop Flanders) | 23 |
| Ireland (IRMA) | 82 |
| Scotland (OCC) | 6 |
| UK Singles (OCC) | 12 |

== Certifications ==
| Region | Certification | Certified units/sales |
|---|---|---|
| United Kingdom (BPI) | Silver | 200,000^{‡} |
^{‡} Sales+streaming figures based on certification alone.

== Release history ==
| Country | Date | Format | Label |
|---|---|---|---|
| United kingdom | 17 May 2015 | Digital download | Virgin EMI |
