= Answerphone (Banx & Ranx and Ella Eyre song) =

Single by Banx & Ranx and Ella Eyre featuring Yxng Bane
- Released: 16 March 2018
- Genre: Electro; dancehall
- Length: 3:10
- Label: Parlophone
- Songwriter(s): Banx & Ranx; Jacob Manson; Ella Eyre; Yxng Bane; Shakka
- Producer(s): Banx & Ranx

Banx & Ranx singles chronology
"Time Bomb" (2017)	"Answerphone" (2018)	"Pyro Ting" (2018)

Ella Eyre singles chronology
"Ego" (2017)	"Answerphone" (2018)	"Just Got Paid" (2018)

Yxng Bane singles chronology
"Vroom" (2018)	"Answerphone" (2018)	"Magic" (2018)

Music video
- "Answerphone" on YouTube

"Answerphone" is a song recorded by Canadian production duo Banx & Ranx and English singer Ella Eyre featuring English rapper Yxng Bane. The song was released by Parlophone on 16 March 2018. It reached number five on the UK Singles Chart on 25 May 2018.

It was co-written by Banx & Ranx, Jacob Manson, Ella Eyre, Yxng Bane, and Shakka.

== Music video ==
A music video to accompany the release of "Answerphone" was first released to YouTube on 16 March 2018, through Banx & Ranx's official YouTube channel.

== Track listing ==
Digital download
No.	Title	Length
1.	"Answerphone" (featuring Yxng Bane)	3:10

== Charts ==
=== Weekly charts ===
Chart (2018)	Peak position
Czech Republic (Rádio – Top 100)	38
Czech Republic (Singles Digitál Top 100)	89
Ireland (IRMA)	10
Netherlands (Single Top 100)	88
Poland (Polish Airplay Top 100)	72
Poland (Dance Top 50)	43
Scotland (OCC)	10
UK Singles (OCC)	5
US Hot Dance/Electronic Songs (Billboard)	22

=== Year-end charts ===
Chart (2018)	Position
UK Singles (Official Charts Company)	51

== Certifications ==
Region	Certification	Certified units/sales
Denmark (IFPI Danmark)	Gold	45,000^{‡}
United Kingdom (BPI)	Platinum	600,000^{‡}
^{‡} Sales+streaming figures based on certification alone.

== Release history ==
Country	Date	Format	Label	Ref.
United Kingdom	16 March 2018	Digital download	Parlophone	
