= Ego (Ella Eyre song) =

Single by Ella Eyre featuring Ty Dolla Sign
- Released: 11 August 2017
- Length: 3:32
- Label: Virgin EMI Records
- Songwriter(s): Ella McMahon; Fransisca Hall; Jesse Shatkin; Tyrone Griffin, Jr.
- Producer(s): Shatkin

Ella Eyre singles chronology
"Came Here for Love" (2017)	"Ego" (2017)	"Answerphone" (2018)

Ty Dolla Sign singles chronology
"Something New" (2017)	"Ego" (2017)	"Leg Over (Remix)" (2017)

"Ego" is a song by English singer-songwriter Ella Eyre featuring American singer-songwriter Ty Dolla $ign. It was released as a single on 11 August 2017. The song peaked at number 67 on the UK Singles Chart.

== Music video ==
A music video to accompany the release of "Ego" was first released onto YouTube on 4 September 2017.

== Charts ==
Chart (2017)	Peak position
Scotland (OCC)	33
Sweden Heatseeker (Sverigetopplistan)	1
UK Singles (OCC)	67

== Release history ==
Region	Date	Format	Label
United Kingdom	11 August 2017	Digital download; streaming	Virgin EMI Records
