= Comeback (Ella Eyre song) =

2014 song by Ella Eyre

Single by Ella Eyre

from the EP Ella Eyre and the album Feline
- Released: 28 September 2014
- Genre: R&B; pop; neo soul
- Length: 3:22
- Label: Virgin EMI
- Songwriters: Ella Eyre; Ilya Salmanzadeh; Oscar Görres; Alexander Kronlund
- Producers: Ilya; OzGo

Ella Eyre singles chronology
| "If I Go" (2014) | "Comeback" (2014) | "Gravity" (2015) |

"Comeback" is a song by English singer Ella Eyre. It was released on 28 September 2014 as the second single from her debut studio album Feline. Eyre wrote "Comeback" at the age of 16 following a break-up, and summed it up as "about being taken advantage of by somebody that you care about, and then eventually you’re angry about the whole situation but it’s almost like saying 'Fuck it, it doesn’t matter because they’ll come back anyway'." The song has charted at number 12 on the UK Singles Chart.

== Music video ==
A music video to accompany the release of "Comeback" was first released onto YouTube on 17 August 2014. Directed by Jon Jon Augustavo, it tried to contrast the more artistic vision of "If I Go" with a plot-driven video that had a comedic spin on the song's angry lyrics, summed up by Eyre as "fun like, ‘I’m a bitch.’". In the video, Eyre and her boyfriend are in a diner, where he starts a break up discussion. Eyre then daydreams about going with her friends to his house and wrecking the place, followed by setting his car on fire. Once the man calls for Eyre's attention as the dream sequence ends, she throws her drink on him and walks away smiling. Eyre stated that it was an attempt to depict a revenge plot "in a sort of innocent way", taking in a sequence that only happens in the character's imagination how "everybody can feel this way and get so angry at someone you think about how to ruin their life".

== Track listing ==
Digital download – single
| No. | Title | Length |
|---|---|---|
| 1. | "Comeback" | 3:22 |

Digital download – EP
| No. | Title | Length |
|---|---|---|
| 1. | "Comeback" (Radio Edit) | 3:22 |
| 2. | "Comeback" (Stripped) | 3:22 |
| 3. | "Bullet for You" | 3:35 |
| 4. | "Comeback" (Fred Falke Radio Edit) | 4:01 |
| 5. | "Comeback" (Ruff Loaderz Radio Edit) | 4:04 |

Digital download – remix EP
| No. | Title | Length |
|---|---|---|
| 1. | "Comeback" (Fred Falke Remix) | 7:11 |
| 2. | "Comeback" (Ruff Loaderz 'Bass 22' Remix) | 6:04 |
| 3. | "Comeback" (Alex Adair Remix) | 3:31 |
| 4. | "Comeback" (Mike Delinquent Remix) | 5:53 |
| 5. | "Comeback" (S.P.Y Jungle Remix) | 3:35 |
| 6. | "Comeback" (S.P.Y Summer Remix) | 4:19 |
| 7. | "Comeback" (Waze & Odyssey Remix) | 6:07 |

== Chart performance ==
=== Weekly charts ===
| Chart (2014) | Peak position |
|---|---|
| Hungary (Rádiós Top 40) | 31 |
| Scotland Singles (OCC) | 10 |
| UK Singles (OCC) | 12 |

== Release history ==
| Region | Date | Format | Label |
|---|---|---|---|
| United Kingdom | 28 September 2014 | Digital download | Virgin EMI |

== Certifications ==
| Region | Certification | Certified units/sales |
|---|---|---|
| United Kingdom (BPI) | Silver | 200,000^{‡} |
^{‡} Sales+streaming figures based on certification alone.
