= Good Times (Ella Eyre song) =

Single by Ella Eyre

from the album Feline and Life (Deluxe edition)
- Released: 21 August 2015
- Genre: Drum and bass
- Length: 3:56
- Label: Virgin EMI
- Songwriters: Ella McMahon; Bruce Fielder; Cameron Edwards; Joe Lenzie
- Producers: Sigma; Sigala; Michael Angelo

Ella Eyre singles chronology
"Together" (2015)	"Good Times" (2015)	"Swing Low, Sweet Chariot" (2015)

Music video
- "Good Times" on YouTube

"Good Times" is a song by English singer Ella Eyre. It was released as the fourth and final single from her debut studio album Feline (2015), it has peaked at number 37 on the UK Singles Chart and number 14 on the Scottish Singles Chart. The song is also included on the deluxe edition of Sigma's debut studio album Life (2015).

== Background ==
"Good Times" was written by Ella Eyre, Sigma and Sigala, produced by Sigma and Sigala, vocal produced by Michael Angelo and performed by Eyre. In an interview with The Line of Best Fit, Eyre noted that if the song was a food it would be sushi, and said that she wrote it in 2015 and that it was about herself and her best friend Chlöe Howl, both of whose circumstances had disintegrated and whose company helped each other get through them. It was released as the fourth single from her debut studio album Feline (2015), and was the fourth track on the album. It was released to iTunes on 14 August 2015 backed with "Fall Down" and was first performed during her set on Glastonbury on 27 June. It has also been featured on an advertisement for SNOG Pure Frozen Yogurt and Channel 5's 2016 trailer.

It is featured at the end of the movie “Pets United”, a Netflix film as well as the trailer for the 2020 documentary series All or Nothing: Tottenham Hotspur

== Critical reception ==
Will Hodgetts of The Edge commended Sigma's influence on the backing track, calling it "as robust and in your face as you’d expect with heavy bass and plenty of synth".

== Music video ==
Two music videos were produced for the song. The first is a montage of candid clips of Eyre interspersed with fan videos. This was released on 29 June 2015. The second was produced by Carly Cussen and was produced in conjunction with ASOS France and includes Eyre and friends performing assorted good deeds. This video was premiered on 22 July and released on Vevo on 24 July.

== Chart performance ==
The song has peaked to number 37 on the UK Singles Chart. and number 14 on the Scottish Singles Chart.

== Charts ==
Chart (2015)	Peak position
Scotland Singles (OCC)	14
UK Singles (OCC)	37
