= If I Go (Ella Eyre song) =

Single by Ella Eyre

from the EP Ella Eyre and the album Feline
- Released: 10 July 2014
- Genre: R&B; pop; breakbeat
- Length: 3:03
- Label: Virgin EMI
- Songwriter(s): Jarrad Rogers; Ella McMahon; Natalia Hajjara
- Producer(s): Jarrad Rogers

Ella Eyre singles chronology
"Deeper" (2013)	"If I Go" (2014)	"Comeback" (2014)

Music video
- "If I Go" on YouTube

"If I Go" is a song by English singer Ella Eyre. It was released on 10 July 2014 as the lead single from her debut studio album Feline. It is her debut solo single, after featuring on "Waiting All Night" by Rudimental and "Think About It" by Naughty Boy. The song has charted at number 16 on the UK Singles Chart. It has also charted at number 80 on the Irish Singles Chart.

== Music video ==
A music video was released on May 30, 2014. It contains people walking three dimensionally around a purpose-built giant rotating box.

== Track listing ==
Digital download
No.	Title	Length
1.	"If I Go"	3:03
2.	"If I Go" (Billon Remix)	5:10
3.	"If I Go" (TCTS Remix)	5:47
4.	"If I Go" (Bodhi Remix)	5:48
5.	"If I Go" (Cadenza Remix)	3:18

== Charts ==
Chart (2014)	Peak position
Belgium (Ultratip Bubbling Under Flanders)	54
Belgium (Ultratip Bubbling Under Wallonia)	45
Ireland (IRMA)	80
Scotland (OCC)	9
UK Singles (OCC)	16

== Certifications ==
Region	Certification	Certified units/sales
United Kingdom (BPI)	Silver	200,000^{‡}
^{‡} Sales+streaming figures based on certification alone.

== Cover versions ==
- Australian Judah Kelly covered the song on his debut album, Count On Me (2017).

== Release history ==
Region	Date	Format	Label
United Kingdom	10 July 2014	Digital download	Virgin EMI
