= I Want You =

I Want You may refer to:

== Film and television ==
- I Want You (1951 film), directed by Mark Robson and starring Dana Andrews
- I Want You (1998 film), starring Rachel Weisz
- "I Want You (She's So Heavy)" (The Simpsons), a 2019 episode of The Simpsons
- I Want You (2012 film), a Spanish drama film

== Music ==
=== Albums ===
- I Want You (Booker T album), 1981
- I Want You (Carried Away album), 2007
- I Want You (Marvin Gaye album), 1976
- I Want You (Shana album), 1989
- I Want You, 1991, by American singer Marc Nelson
- I Want You, 1979, by Wilson Pickett, or its title track

=== Songs ===
- "I Want U", by Alison Wonderland, 2014
- "I Want You" (Bob Dylan song), 1966
- "I Want You (She's So Heavy)", by The Beatles, 1969
- "I Want You" (Cheap Trick song), 1982
- "I Want You" (Cody Johnson song), 2026
- "I Want You" (Common song), 2007
- "I Want You" (Elvis Costello song), 1986
- "I Want You" (Gary Low song), 1983
- "I Want You" (Janet Jackson song), 2004
- "I Want You" (Jody Watley song), 1991
- "I Want You" (Juliet Roberts song), 1994
- "I Want You" (Martin Solveig song), 2008
- "I Want You" (Marvin Gaye song), 1976, covered in 1990 by Robert Palmer covered as a medley with "Mercy Mercy Me", and by Madonna with Massive Attack in 1995
- "I Want You" (Paris Avenue song), 2004
- "I Want You" (Roxette song), 1987
- "I Want You" (Savage Garden song), 1996
- "I Want You" (Shana song), 1989
- "I Want You" (Thalía song), 2003
- "I Want You" (Toni Pearen song), 1993
- "I Want You" (Wa Wa Nee song), 1989
- "I Want You (Hold On to Love)", by CeeLo Green, 2011
- "I Want You" (SB19 song), 2023
- "I Want You" by 2PM, from Genesis of 2PM, 2014
- "I Want You" by Afrob, from the album Der Letzte seiner Art, 2009
- "I Want You" by Air Supply, from Across the Concrete Sky, 2003
- "I Want You" by Alexia, from Happy, 1999
- "I Want You" by Angelyne, from Angelyne, 1982
- "I Want You" by Animotion, from Strange Behavior, 1986
- "I Want You" by Arthur Loves Plastic, from Brief Episodes of Joy, 2008
- "I Want You" by Babyface featuring After 7, from Return of the Tender Lover, 2015
- "I Want You" by Erykah Badu, from Worldwide Underground, 2003
- "I Want You" by The Beau Brummels, from The Beau Brummels, Volume 2, 1965
- "I Want You" by Kasper Bjørke, 2001
- "I Want You" by Mary J. Blige, from the soundtrack for the film Think Like a Man Too, 2014
- "I Want You" by The Blue Van, from The Art of Rolling, 2005
- "I Want You" by Bon Jovi, from Keep the Faith, 1992
- "I Want You" by The Graham Bond Organization, from The Sound of '65, 1965
- "I Want You" by Brothers Johnson, from Winners, 1981
- "I Want You" by Buckcherry, from All Night Long, 2010
- "I Want You" by Lindsey Buckingham, from Go Insane, 1984
- "I Want You" by Kandi Burruss, from Kandi Koated, 2010
- "I Want You" by Jonathan Byrd, from This Is the New That, 2007
- "I Want You" by Cabaret Voltaire, from The Covenant, the Sword, and the Arm of the Lord, 1985
- "I Want You" by Anthony Callea, from Anthony Callea, 2005
- "I Want You" by Calloway, from All the Way, 1989
- "I Want You" by Celly Cel, from It'z Real Out Here, 2005
- "I Want You" by Kelly Clarkson, from All I Ever Wanted, 2009
- "I Want You" by Dean Coleman, remixed by Dave Audé, 2009
- "I Want You" by Concrete Blonde, B-side of the single "Joey", 1990
- "I Want You" by Ida Corr, from Under the Sun, 2009
- "I Want You" by Sheryl Crow, from C'mon, C'mon, 2002
- "I Want You" by Alana Davis, from Fortune Cookies, 2001
- "I Want You" by Dead or Alive, from Mad, Bad and Dangerous to Know, 1987
- "I Want You" by Chico DeBarge, from Addiction, 2009
- "I Want You" by Delain, from We Are the Others, 2012
- "I Want You" by Fefe Dobson, from Joy, 2010
- "I Want You" by Elliot Easton, from Change No Change, 1985
- "I Want You" by Electrico, from So Much More Inside, 2004
- "I Want You" by Melissa Etheridge, from Melissa Etheridge, 1988
- "I Want You" by Sara Evans, from Words, 2017
- "I Want You" by Friday Hill, from Times Like These, 2006
- "I Want You" by The Godfathers, from Hit by Hit, 1986
- "I Want You" by Great White, from Psycho City, 1992
- "I Want You" by Hanoi Rocks, from Self Destruction Blues, 1982
- "I Want You" by Debbie Harry, from Rockbird, 1986
- "I Want You" by Sophie B. Hawkins, from Tongues and Tails, 1992
- "I Want You" by Mark Heard, from Mosaics, 1985
- "I Want You" by Michael Hedges, from Watching My Life Go By, 1985
- "I Want You" by Faith Hill, from Fireflies, 2005
- "I Want You" by Paris Hilton, from Paris, 2006
- "I Want You" by Holly Cole, from Temptation, 1995
- "I Want You" by Inspiral Carpets, from Devil Hopping, 1994
- "I Want You" by Janez Detd., from For Better For Worse, 2008
- "I Want You" by Joan Jett, from Notorious, 1991
- "I Want You" by Nick Jonas, from Nick Jonas, 2014
- "I Want You" by Danko Jones, from We Sweat Blood, 2003
- "I Want You" by Kid Courageous, from Dear Diary, 2006
- "I Want You" by Kings of Leon, from Only by the Night, 2008
- "I Want You" by Kiss, from Rock and Roll Over, 1976
- "I Want You" by The Kooks, from Inside In / Inside Out, 2006
- "I Want You" by Blake Lewis featuring Samantha James, from Portrait of a Chameleon, 2014
- "I Want You" by Huey Lewis and the News, from Huey Lewis and the News, 1980
- "I Want You" by LL Cool J, from Radio, 1985
- "I Want You" by Lollipop, from Popstars, 2001
- "I Want You" by Traci Lords, from 1000 Fires, 1995
- "I Want You" by David Lynch, from The Big Dream, 2013
- "I Want You" by The Maine, from Pioneer and the Good Love, 2012
- "I Want You" by Marky Mark and the Funky Bunch, from You Gotta Believe, 1992
- "I Want You" by Michael McDonald, from Blink of an Eye, 1993
- "I Want You" by Michael McDonald, from Motown, 2003
- "I Want You" by Christine McVie, from Christine Perfect, 1970
- "I Want You" by Marco Mendoza, from Live for Tomorrow, 2007
- "I Want You" by Chrisette Michele, from Let Freedom Reign, 2010
- "I Want You" by Moloko, from Statues, 2003
- "I Want You" by Mugison, from Mugimama Is This Monkey Music?, 2004
- "I Want You" by Dolores O'Riordan, from No Baggage, 2009
- "I Want You" by The Party, from Free, 1992
- "I Want You!" by Peter Bjorn and John, from Living Thing, 2009
- "I Want You" by Mike Peters, from Rise, 1998
- "I Want You" by PJ & Duncan AKA, from Psyche, 1994
- "I Want You" by Jesse Powell, from Jesse, 2003
- "I Want You" by Praga Khan, from Pragamatic, 1998
- "I Want You" by Pulp, from Freaks, 1987
- "I Want You" by Rage, from Trapped!, 1992
- "I Want You" by Real McCoy, from Another Night, 1995
- "I Want You" by Jessica Riddle, from Key of a Minor, 2000
- "I Want You" by Rivermaya, from Buhay, 2008
- "I Want You" by Diana Ross, from I Love You, 2006
- "I Want You" by Saliva, from Survival of the Sickest, 2004
- "I Want You" by Sandra, from Back to Life, 2009
- "I Want You" by Savant, from Ninür, 2011
- "I Want You" by Michael Schenker Group, from In the Midst of Beauty, 2008
- "I Want You" by Shack, from H.M.S. Fable, 1999
- "I Want You" by The Silencers, from Dance to the Holy Man, 1991
- "I Want You" by Horace Silver, from The Hardbop Grandpop, 1996
- "I Want You" by Sizzla, from Ghetto Revolutionary, 2002
- "I Want You" by Snow, from Justuss, 1997
- "I Want You" by Spiritualized, from Lazer Guided Melodies, 1992
- "I Want You" by Squeeze, from Ridiculous, 1995
- "I Want You" by SS501, from All My Love, 2009
- "I Want You" by Stiff Little Fingers, from Get a Life, 1994
- "I Want You" by Surf City, from We Knew It Was Not Going to Be Like This, 2013
- "I Want You" by Keith Sweat, from Rebirth, 2002
- "I Want You" by Taken by Trees, from Other Worlds, 2012
- "I Want You" by Third Eye Blind, from Third Eye Blind, 1997
- "I Want You" by Jeanie Tracy, from Me and You, 1982
- "I Want You" by The Troggs, from From Nowhere, 1966
- "I Want You" by Bonnie Tyler, from Simply Believe, 2004
- "I Want You" by U;Nee, from Call Call Call, 2005
- "I Want You" by Utah Saints, from Utah Saints, 1992
- "I Want You" by Tom Waits, from The Early Years, Volume Two, 1993
- "I Want You" by Narada Michael Walden, from Victory, 1980
- "I Want You" by Kim Waters featuring Vivian Green, from I Want You: Love in the Spirit of Marvin, 2008
- "I Want You" by Wet Wet Wet, from 10, 1997
- "I Want You" by The Whispers, from Just Gets Better with Time, 1987
- "I Want You" by Tony Joe White, from ...Continued, 1969
- "I Want You" by Deniece Williams, from Let's Hear It for the Boy, 1984
- "I Want You" by Rachael Yamagata, from Happenstance, 2004
- "I Want You" by Zard, from Yureru Omoi, 1993
- "I Want You #35" by Rodney Crowell, from Sex & Gasoline, 2008
- "I Want You Remix" by Lloyd featuring Andre 3000 and Nas, from Street Love, 2007
- "I Want You (Girlfriend)" by Pretty Ricky, from Bluestars, 2005
- "I Want You (I'm an 80's Man)" by Prince Paul, from Itstrumental, 2005
- "Ich will Dich (I Want You)" by Die Ärzte, from the album Das ist nicht die ganze Wahrheit..., 1988
- "Je te Veux (I Want You)" by Malice Mizer, from the album Merveilles, 1998
- "Je te veux (I Want You)", written by Erik Satie
- "Quero Você (I Want You)" by Roupa Nova, from the album Roupa Nova em Londres, 2009
- "Tomake Chai" ("I Want You") by Kabir Suman, 1992
- "Σε Θέλω (I Want You)" by Antique, from the album Mera Me Ti Mera, 1999
- "アイ ウォン チュー (I Want You)" by Sambomaster, from the album Kimi no Tame ni Tsuyoku Naritai, 2010
- "너를 원해 (I Want You)" by Seo In-young, from Elly Is So Hot, 2007
- "I Want You, I Need You, I Love You", by Elvis Presley, 1956
- "I Want You Right Now", by MC5, from Kick Out the Jams, 1969
- "I Want You to Need Me", by Céline Dion, 2000
- "I Want You to Want Me", by Cheap Trick, 1977

== See also ==
- I Want You Back (disambiguation)
- I Want You So Bad (disambiguation)
- I Want You to Know (disambiguation)
- You Want Me (disambiguation)
- Te Quiero (disambiguation)
- "I Want YOU for U. S. Army", the text of a U.S. military recruitment poster by J. M. Flagg
