= List of Platinum singles in the United Kingdom awarded since 2000 =

In the United Kingdom, singles are certified Platinum by the British Phonographic Industry (BPI) when they pass 600,000 units as measured by the Official Charts Company. Since July 2013, this has been automatically applied by the BPI as a single reaches the threshold of any multiple of 600,000 rather than relying on the record companies to apply for the awards or limiting awards to releases after 1973 (when the awards system was first set up).

Since 1 January 1989, the number of sales required to qualify for Silver, Gold and Platinum discs has been 200,000, 400,000 and 600,000, respectively. Prior to this, the thresholds were 250,000 (Silver), 500,000 (Gold) and 1,000,000 (Platinum). For singles released before the current thresholds, only digital sales since 2005 are used to calculate the certification: so, for example, "Eye of the Tiger" by Survivor was a Gold record from 1982 (500,000 copies) and passed 1 million sales before 2010, but was certified Platinum only in 2014 for 600,000 digital sales (streams and downloads), while its total sales exceeded 1.46 million.

From February 2005, downloads became eligible and for awards made in or after July 2014, audio streaming has been included at a rate of 100 streams equivalent to one unit (with any streams from the start of 2014 being counted).

In the tables below the certifications are all multiples of 600,000 units unless otherwise stated and separated according to whether streaming is included. On 22 July 2013, a large number of certifications were made for singles whose sales passed awards thresholds once digital sales since 2005 were added, and again in July 2014 once audio streams from the start of 2014 were added.

== Artists with the most Multi-Platinum singles ==
The artist with the most Multi-Platinum singles in the UK is Ed Sheeran, with 24.

Artist	No. of awards
Ed Sheeran	24
Rihanna	22
Eminem	15
Drake	14
Bruno Mars	14
Calvin Harris	13
Coldplay	13
Ariana Grande	13
Justin Bieber	12
Lady Gaga	11
Adele	10
Billie Eilish	10
Dua Lipa	10
Sam Smith	10
Beyoncé	9
Arctic Monkeys	9
Katy Perry	9
Post Malone	8
Jess Glynne	8
The Weeknd	8
David Guetta	8
Little Mix	8
Sia	7
Elton John	7
Kanye West	7
Chris Brown	7
Nicki Minaj	7
Flo Rida	7
Khalid	7
One Direction	7
Maroon 5	6
Stormzy	6
SZA	6
Lewis Capaldi	6
Queen	6
Avicii	6
George Ezra	6
Jason Derulo	6
Dave	6
Miley Cyrus	6
Jay-Z	5
Michael Jackson	5
Nelly	5
Becky Hill	5
Doja Cat	5
Ellie Goulding	5
Pink	5
Shawn Mendes	5
Harry Styles	5

== Multi-Platinum awards ==
=== 7 Million Units ===
==== 12× Platinum ====
"Mr Brightside" is the first song to go 12× Platinum in the 21st century (7,200,000 units).

Artist	Song	Date released	Date certified 12× Platinum
The Killers	"Mr Brightside"	December 2005	June 2026

=== 6 Million Units ===
==== 11× Platinum ====
"Shape of You" is the first song to go 11× Platinum in the 21st century (6,600,000 units).

Artist	Song	Date released	Date certified 11× Platinum
Ed Sheeran	"Shape of You"	January 2017	June 2025

==== 10× Platinum ====
"Shape of You" was the first song to go 10× Platinum in the 21st century (6,000,000 units). When it passed 5× Platinum, its total was made up of 764,737 downloads and 2,241,667 sales-equivalent streams. In November 2024, "Mr Brightside" became only the second song to achieve this feat. It is also the biggest song on the Official Charts never to reach the summit. The last available pure figures in May 2024 had a total made up of 1,066,000 sales and 530,340,000 streams.

Artist	Song	Date released	Date certified 10× Platinum
Lewis Capaldi	"Someone You Loved"	November 2018	May 2025
Ed Sheeran	"Perfect"	March 2017	November 2025
Mariah Carey	"All I Want for Christmas is You"	November 1994	December 2025

=== 5 Million Units ===
==== 9× Platinum ====
Artist	Song	Date released	Date certified 9× Platinum
Oasis	"Wonderwall"	October 1995	March 2026

=== 4 Million Units ===
==== 8× Platinum ====
"Perfect" was the second song to go 8× Platinum in the 21st century (4,800,000 units)

Artist	Song	Date released	Date certified 8× Platinum
Wham!	"Last Christmas"	December 1984	January 2025
Ed Sheeran	"Thinking Out Loud"	June 2014	February 2025
The Weeknd	"Blinding Lights"	November 2019	April 2025
George Ezra	"Shotgun"	May 2018	October 2025
Hozier	"Take Me to Church"	August 2014	November 2025
Kings of Leon	"Sex on Fire"	September 2008	October 2026

==== 7× Platinum ====
"Perfect" was the second song to go 7× Platinum in the 21st century (4,200,000 units) "All I Want for Christmas Is You" is the first song ever by a female artist to reach 7× platinum.

Artist	Song	Date released	Date certified 7× Platinum
Mark Ronson featuring Bruno Mars	"Uptown Funk"	November 2014	January 2024
Drake featuring Wizkid and Kyla	"One Dance"	April 2016	February 2024
Adele	"Someone like You"	January 2011	July 2024
Luis Fonsi and Daddy Yankee featuring Justin Bieber	"Despacito (Remix)"	April 2017	August 2024
John Legend	"All of Me"	February 2014	October 2024
Vance Joy	"Riptide"	December 2013	December 2024
Tones and I	"Dance Monkey"	July 2019	February 2025
Ed Sheeran	"Castle on the Hill"	January 2017	July 2025
Goo Goo Dolls	"Iris"	January 1998	July 2025
James Arthur	"Say You Won't Let Go"	September 2016	August 2025
Bastille	"Pompeii"	March 2013	September 2025
Journey	"Don't Stop Believin'"	December 1981	October 2025
Ed Sheeran	"Bad Habits"	June 2021	November 2025
Avicii	"Wake Me Up"	July 2013	December 2025
Oasis	"Don't Look Back in Anger"	February 1996	January 2026
Coldplay	"Viva la Vida"	June 2008	January 2026
Snow Patrol	"Chasing Cars"	July 2006	March 2026
Arctic Monkeys	"Do I Wanna Know?"	June 2013	October 2026
Pharrell Williams	"Happy"	November 2013	September 2026
OneRepublic	"Counting Stars"	March 2013	November 2026

=== 3 Million Units ===
==== 6× Platinum ====
"Uptown Funk" is the latest release to sell a million copies, having sales of 1.39 million by June 2015, implying that it had been streamed more than 41 million times by the time it reached 3× Platinum status and over 80 million times when it reached 4× Platinum.

Artist	Song	Date released	Date certified 6× Platinum
Passenger	"Let Her Go"	October 2012	February 2024
George Ezra	"Budapest"	November 2013	August 2024
French Montana featuring Swae Lee	"Unforgettable"	April 2017	December 2024
Lady Gaga and Bradley Cooper	"Shallow"	September 2018	January 2025
Calvin Harris and Dua Lipa	"One Kiss"	June 2018	February 2025
Eminem	"Lose Yourself"	November 2002	February 2025
Clean Bandit featuring Jess Glynne	"Rather Be"	January 2014	April 2025
Tom Odell	"Another Love"	January 2013	July 2025
Fleetwood Mac	"Dreams"	March 2007	July 2025
Justin Bieber	"Love Yourself"	November 2015	August 2025
Coldplay	"Yellow"	June 2000	August 2025
Justin Bieber	"Sorry"	October 2015	September 2025
Ed Sheeran	"The A Team"	June 2011	October 2025
Eminem featuring Rihanna	"Love the Way You Lie"	June 2010	November 2025
Macklemore & Ryan Lewis featuring Ray Dalton	"Can't Hold Us"	October 2012	November 2025
Zara Larsson	"Lush Life"	January 2016	May 2026
Bryan Adams	"Summer of '69"	June 1985	May 2026
Florence and the Machine	"Dog Days Are Over"	January 2009	June 2026
Ed Sheeran	"Photograph"	June 2014	September 2026
The Weeknd featuring Daft Punk	"Starboy"	September 2016	October 2026
Sam Smith	"Stay with Me"	May 2014	September 2026
Nirvana	"Smells Like Teen Spirit"	November 1991	November 2026

==== 5× Platinum ====
"Happy" was the first song certified 3× Platinum after streaming was included, having sold 1.55 million copies by July 2014 and been streamed over 25 million times from January to July 2014.

Artist	Song	Date released	Date certified 5× Platinum
Shakira featuring Wyclef Jean	"Hips Don't Lie"	January 2006	July 2026
The Pogues featuring Kirsty MacColl	"Fairytale of New York"	November 1987	December 2022
Sia	"Cheap Thrills"	February 2016	March 2023
David Guetta featuring Sia	"Titanium"	August 2011	November 2023
Calum Scott	"Dancing on My Own"	April 2016	January 2024
Ed Sheeran	"Galway Girl"	March 2017	August 2024
Queen	"Bohemian Rhapsody"	October 1975	March 2024
Queen	"Don't Stop Me Now"	January 1979	April 2024
Gotye featuring Kimbra	"Somebody That I Used to Know"	December 2011	May 2024
Post Malone featuring Swae Lee	"Sunflower"	October 2018	July 2024
Adele	"Rolling in the Deep"	January 2011	August 2024
Glass Animals	"Heat Waves"	June 2020	August 2024
Bruno Mars	"Just the Way You Are"	August 2010	August 2024
The Chainsmokers & Coldplay	"Something Just Like This"	February 2017	September 2024
The Chainsmokers featuring Halsey	"Closer"	July 2016	November 2024
Sia	"Chandelier"	July 2014	November 2024
Harry Styles	"As It Was"	April 2022	November 2024
Carly Rae Jepsen	"Call Me Maybe"	April 2012	June 2024
Billie Eilish	"Bad Guy"	March 2019	January 2025
Guns N' Roses	"Sweet Child o' Mine"	May 1989	January 2025
Cher	"Believe"	October 1998	January 2025
Christina Perri	"A Thousand Years"	November 2011	February 2025
Eminem	"Without Me"	June 2002	February 2025
Florence and the Machine	"You've Got the Love"	July 2009	February 2025
Jason Mraz	"I'm Yours"	April 2008	March 2025
Pinkfong	" Baby Shark"	August 2017	March 2025
Rudimental featuring Jess Glynne, Macklemore & Dan Caplen	"These Days"	January 2018	March 2025
Ed Sheeran	"Shivers"	September 2021	May 2025
TLC	"No Scrubs"	February 1999	May 2025
Lewis Capaldi	" Before You Go"	November 2019	June 2025
Joel Corry featuring MNEK	"Head & Heart"	July 2020	June 2025
Imagine Dragons	"Believer"	February 2017	July 2025
Whitney Houston	"I Wanna Dance With Somebody"	May 1987	July 2025
Katy Perry	"Roar"	September 2013	July 2025
Noah Kahan	" Stick Season"	July 2022	July 2025
Shawn Mendes	"Stitches"	May 2015	August 2025
Lana Del Rey vs. Cedric Gervais	"Summertime Sadness"	July 2013	August 2025
The Weeknd	"Save Your Tears"	August 2020	September 2025
Major Lazer and DJ Snake featuring MØ	"Lean On"	March 2015	October 2025
Post Malone featuring 21 Savage	"Rockstar"	September 2017	October 2025
Clean Bandit featuring Zara Larsson	"Symphony"	March 2017	October 2025
James Bay	"Let It Go"	May 2014	October 2025
Ed Sheeran & Justin Bieber	"I Don't Care"	May 2019	November 2025
Bon Jovi	"Livin' on a Prayer"	October 1986	November 2025
Calvin Harris featuring Rihanna	"This Is What You Came For"	April 2016	November 2025
Shakin' Stevens	"Merry Christmas Everyone"	November 1985	December 2025
Imagine Dragons	"Radioactive"	November 2012	January 2026
Maroon 5 featuring Christina Aguilera	"Moves Like Jagger"	August 2011	December 2025
Benson Boone	"Beautiful Things"	January 2024	January 2026
Michael Jackson	"Billie Jean"	January 1983	February 2026
Lil Nas X	"Old Town Road	March 2019	March 2026
Harry Styles	"Watermelon Sugar"	December 2019	March 2026
Eminem	"The Real Slim Shady"	April 2000	April 2026
Dua Lipa	"Don't Start Now"	October 2019	April 2026
The Weeknd	"The Hills"	May 2015	April 2026
Coldplay	"A Sky Full of Stars"	May 2014	May 2026
James Bay	"Hold Back the River"	November 2014	May 2026
Dua Lipa	"Levitating"	October 2020	May 2026
Olivia Rodrigo	"Good 4 U"	May 2021	June 2026
Gorillaz	"Feel Good Inc"	March 2005	June 2026
Alex Warren	"Ordinary"	April 2025	June 2026
Olivia Dean	"Man I Need"	August 2025	October 2026
Adele	"Make You Feel My Love"	January 2008	October 2026
Beyoncé	"Halo"	November 2008	September 2026
Eminem	"Stan"	December 2000	September 2026
Mark Ronson featuring Amy Winehouse	"Valerie"	June 2007	October 2026
Estelle featuring Kanye West	"American Boy"	March 2008	October 2026
Benny Blanco, Halsey & khalid	"Eastside"	July 2018	October 2026
Earth, Wind & Fire	"September"	November 1978	October 2026
Elton John and Dua Lipa	"Cold Heart"	August 2021	October 2026
Adele	"Set Fire to the Rain"	January 2011	October 2026
Eagles	"Hotel California"	February 1977	November 2026

=== 2 Million Sales ===
==== 4× Platinum ====
Artist	Song	Date released	Date certified 4× Platinum
Justin Bieber	"What Do You Mean?"	August 2015	September 2021
OMI	"Cheerleader"	April 2015	August 2020
Justin Timberlake	"Can't Stop the Feeling!"	May 2016	October 2020
Adele	"Hello"	October 2015	December 2020
Lukas Graham	"7 Years"	December 2015	January 2021
Keala Settle	"This Is Me"	October 2017	April 2021
Walk the Moon	"Shut Up and Dance"	September 2014	June 2021
Camila Cabello featuring Young Thug	"Havana"	August 2017	July 2021
Dua Lipa	"New Rules"	January 2017	September 2020
Rag'n'Bone Man	"Human"	July 2016	January 2022
Daft Punk featuring Pharrell Williams	"Get Lucky"	April 2013	January 2022
Rihanna featuring Calvin Harris	"We Found Love"	September 2011	May 2022
Taylor Swift	"Shake It Off"	August 2014	August 2022
Coolio featuring L.V.	"Gangsta's Paradise"	October 1995	October 2022
Arctic Monkeys	"I Bet You Look Good on the Dancefloor"	October 2005	December 2023
The Fray	"How to Save a Life"	January 2005	March 2024
Coldplay	"Fix You"	June 2005	March 2024
George Ezra	"Paradise"	January 2018	April 2024
Little Mix	"Shout Out to My Ex"	October 2016	August 2024
Tom Walker	"Leave a Light On"	October 2017	September 2024
Coldplay	"Paradise"	September 2011	September 2024
Bruno Mars	"When I Was Your Man"	December 2012	October 2024
Rihanna featuring Jay-Z	"Umbrella"	May 2007	August 2024
50 Cent	"In da Club"	January 2003	October 2024
Imagine Dragons	"Demons"	April 2013	November 2024
The Black Eyed Peas	"Where Is the Love?"	September 2003	November 2024
Britney Spears	"Baby One More Time"	November 2004	November 2024
Sam Smith	"I'm Not the Only One"	August 2014	December 2024
Michael Buble	"It's Beginning To Look A Lot Like Christmas"	October 2011	December 2024
Arctic Monkeys	"Why'd You Only Call Me When You're High?"	August 2013	January 2025
Rihanna	"Diamonds"	September 2012	January 2025
Lady Gaga	"Poker Face"	September 2008	January 2025
Marvin Gaye & Tammi Terrell	"Ain't No Mountain High Enough"	April 1967	January 2025
Van Morrison	"Brown Eyed Girl"	June 1967	January 2025
Robbie Williams	"Angels"	December 1997	January 2025
Bruno Mars	"Locked Out of Heaven"	October 2012	February 2025
The Script	"The Man Who Can't Be Moved"	July 2008	February 2025
The Weeknd	"Can't Feel My Face"	June 2015	February 2025
Rihanna	"Stay"	November 2012	February 2025
Little Mix	"Black Magic"	May 2015	February 2025
Rihanna	"Only Girl (In the World)"	October 2010	February 2025
Coldplay	"The Scientist"	November 2002	March 2025
Panic At The Disco	"High Hopes"	May 2018	March 2025
Adele	"Easy On Me"	October 2021	March 2025
Drake	"Nice for What"	April 2018	March 2025
Katy Perry	"Firework"	August 2010	April 2025
Taylor Swift	"Cruel Summer"	October 2022	May 2025
Taylor Swift	"Blank Space"	November 2014	May 2025
Coldplay	"Hymn for the Weekend"	February 2016	May 2025
Bruno Mars	"Grenade"	September 2010	May 2025
Sam Fender	" Seventeen Going Under "	July 2021	May 2025
Taylor Swift	"Love Story"	September 2008	May 2025
Aerosmith	"I Don't Want to Miss a Thing"	January 1997	May 2025
One Direction	"What Makes You Beautiful"	September 2011	June 2025
Shawn Mendes	"There's Nothing Holdin' Me Back"	April 2017	June 2025
Teddy Swims	"Lose Control"	June 2023	June 2025
Miley Cyrus	"Flowers"	January 2023	June 2025
Leona Lewis	"Bleeding Love"	October 2007	July 2025
Sam Smith	"Too Good at Goodbyes"	September 2017	July 2025
Sabrina Carpenter	"Espresso"	April 2024	August 2025
Twenty One Pilots	"Stressed Out"	April 2015	August 2025
Adele	"When We Were Young"	November 2015	August 2025
Kendrick Lamar & SZA	"All the Stars"	January 2018	October 2025
Coldplay	"Adventure of a Lifetime"	November 2015	October 2025
Lady Gaga	"Just Dance"	November 2008	November 2025
Taylor Swift	"Anti-Hero"	October 2022	November 2025
Lady Gaga	"Bad Romance"	October 2009	January 2025
Billie Eilish and Khalid	"Lovely"	April 2018	May 2026
Chappell Roan	"Good Luck Babe"	April 2024	May 2026
Amy Winehouse	"Back to Black"	April 2007	June 2026
J Hus	"Did You See"	March 2017	October 2026

=== 1 Million Sales ===
==== 3× Platinum ====
"Anything Is Possible" / "Evergreen" by Pop Idol winner Will Young is the only single since 2000 to achieve 3× Platinum based on shipments at its original release (sales estimates by the Official Charts Company put it just short of 1.8 million). "Barbie Girl" by Aqua and "Believe" by Cher were both released before 2000 and benefited from changes in eligibility rules which allowed downloads (and streaming in the case of "Believe") to be counted for any song regardless of release date.

The first single to achieve 3× Platinum without selling a million copies was "Sorry" by Justin Bieber, which had more than 100 million streams by August 2016.

Ed Sheeran has ten singles certified triple platinum or above, Lady Gaga has six, Justin Bieber has five and Pharrell Williams has three.

Artist	Song	Date released	Date certified 3× Platinum
Shakira	"Whenever Wherever"	October 2001	July 2026
Shakira	"Waka Waka (This Time for Africa)"	May 2010	November 2025
Aqua	"Barbie Girl"	May 1997	July 2013
Will Young	"Anything Is Possible"/"Evergreen"	February 2002	March 2002
Spice Girls	"Wannabe"	July 1996	November 2019
Puff Daddy featuring Faith Evans	"I'll Be Missing You"	June 1997	February 2018
Celine Dion	"My Heart Will Go On"	February 1998	May 2019
Shaggy featuring Rikrok	"It Wasn't Me"	January 2001	September 2018
The Black Eyed Peas	"I Gotta Feeling"	July 2009	March 2019
Robin Thicke featuring T.I. and Pharrell Williams	"Blurred Lines"	May 2013	December 2015
Kelly Clarkson	"Underneath the Tree"	October 2013	January 2025
Mr Probz	"Waves"	April 2014	June 2018
Mike Posner	"I Took a Pill in Ibiza"	January 2016	November 2018
Clean Bandit featuring Sean Paul and Anne-Marie	"Rockabye"	October 2016	April 2019
Ariana Grande	"One Last Time"	August 2014	November 2020
Major Lazer featuring Justin Bieber and MØ	"Cold Water"	July 2016	December 2021
Stormzy	"Vossi Bop"	April 2019	March 2022
Mabel	"Don't Call Me Up"	January 2019	April 2022
Fifth Harmony featuring Ty Dolla Sign	"Work from Home"	February 2016	April 2022
Juice WRLD	"Lucid Dreams"	March 2018	May 2022
Ed Sheeran	"Sing"	June 2014	August 2021
Ed Sheeran	"Lego House"	September 2011	May 2022
Ed Sheeran	"Don't"	June 2014	July 2024
Ed Sheeran	"Happier"	March 2017	September 2024
Ed Sheeran featuring Khalid	"Beautiful People"	June 2019	July 2022
DJ Khaled featuring Rihanna & Bryson Tiller	"Wild Thoughts"	June 2017	July 2022
Shawn Mendes	"Treat You Better"	June 2016	December 2022
Ariana Grande	"No Tears Left to Cry"	April 2018	December 2022
Stormzy featuring Ed Sheeran & Burna Boy	"Own It"	November 2019	January 2022
Dua Lipa	"IDGAF"	January 2018	February 2023
Ariana Grande	"Thank U, Next"	November 2018	March 2023
ABBA	"Dancing Queen"	August 1976	May 2024
Kygo & Whitney Houston	"Higher Love"	June 2019	May 2023
Sigala featuring Ella Eyre	"Came Here For Love"	June 2017	March 2024
Eminem	"Mockingbird"	April 2005	July 2024
Ed Sheeran featuring Stormzy	"Take Me Back to London"	July 2019	October 2024
Drake featuring Rihanna	"Take Care"	November 2011	October 2024
Jay-Z featuring Alicia Keys	"Empire State of Mind"	October 2009	October 2024
Linkin Park	"In the End"	October 2001	May 2023
Linkin Park	"Numb"	September 2003	April 2024
Jay-Z and Linkin Park	"Numb/Encore"	December 2004	March 2023
Britney Spears	"Toxic"	March 2004	November 2024
Sia	"Elastic Heart"	January 2015	January 2025
One Direction	"Story of My Life"	November 2013	February 2025
Katy Perry featuring Juicy J	"Dark Horse"	September 2013	February 2025
The Weeknd	"Earned It"	January 2015	March 2025
Dizzee Rascal and Armand van Helden	"Bonkers"	May 2009	May 2025
Bruno Mars	"That's What I Like"	November 2016	May 2025
Michael Jackson	"Beat It"	February 1983	June 2025
Shaboozey	"A Bar Song (Tipsy)"	April 2024	June 2025
Fireboy DML and Ed Sheeran	"Peru"	December 2021	October 2025
Katy Perry	"Hot n Cold"	July 2008	October 2025
Eminem featuring Ed Sheeran	"River"	December 2017	November 2025
Ed Sheeran	"Bloodstream"	March 2015	January 2026
Rosé and Bruno Mars	"APT."	October 2024	March 2026
Lady Gaga & Ariana Grande	"Rain on Me"	May 2020	February 2026
Lady Gaga & Bruno Mars	"Die with a Smile"	August 2024	February 2026

==== 2× Platinum ====
The artists with the most double platinum awards is Ed Sheeran

==== Sales or shipments only ====
Artist	Song	Date released	Date certified 2× Platinum
Fugees	"Killing Me Softly"	January 1996	July 2013‡
Spice Girls	"Wannabe"	July 1996	July 2013
Take That	"Back for Good"	March 1995	July 1996
Run–D.M.C. vs. Jason Nevins	"It's Like That"	March 1998	July 2013
Gareth Gates	"Unchained Melody"	March 2002	March 2002
Band Aid 20	"Do They Know It's Christmas?"	November 2004	December 2004
Tony Christie featuring Peter Kay	"(Is This the Way to) Amarillo"	March 2005	July 2013
The X Factor 2008 finalists	"Hero"	October 2008	January 2009
Alexandra Burke	"Hallelujah"	December 2008	July 2013
LMFAO featuring Lauren Bennett & GoonRock	"Party Rock Anthem"	January 2011	July 2013
Psy	"Gangnam Style"	September 2012	December 2013
James Arthur	"Impossible"	December 2012	July 2013

‡Previously awarded 2× Platinum in 1996

==== Including streaming (certified July 2014 onwards) ====
Artist	Song	Date released	Date certified 2× Platinum
Rage Against the Machine	"Killing in the Name"	November 1992	September 2020
Toto	" Africa"	May 1982	July 2019
The Pogues featuring Kirsty MacColl	"Fairytale of New York"	November 1987	December 2016
Tracy Chapman	"Fast Car"	April 1988	July 2019
Whitney Houston	"I Have Nothing"	February 1993	August 2025
No Doubt	"Don't Speak"	January 1995	September 2018
Spice Girls	"2 Become 1"	December 1996	March 2018
The Verve	"Bitter Sweet Symphony"	January 1997	December 2018
Natalie Imbruglia	"Torn"	October 1997	September 2015
Boyzone	"No Matter What"	August 1998	July 2018
Whitney Houston	"It's Not Right but It's Okay"	January 1999	August 2024
Eiffel 65	"Blue (Da Ba Dee)"	April 1999	May 2017
Lou Bega	"Mambo No. 5 (A Little Bit of...)"	April 1999	August 2018
Wheatus	"Teenage Dirtbag"	July 2000	January 2018
Toploader	"Dancing in the Moonlight"	November 2000	February 2019
Enrique Iglesias	"Hero"	August 2001	June 2018
Kylie Minogue	"Can't Get You Out of My Head"	September 2001	August 2015
Nelly featuring Kelly Rowland	"Dilemma"	October 2002	May 2018
R. Kelly	"Ignition (Remix)"	January 2003	June 2017
Beyoncé featuring Jay-Z	"Crazy in Love"	January 2003	January 2019
Outkast	"Hey Ya!"	September 2003	April 2019
Kanye West featuring Jamie Foxx	"Gold Digger"	August 2005	July 2018
The Kooks	"Naïve"	March 2006	August 2018
Gnarls Barkley	"Crazy"	April 2006	April 2016
Kanye West	"Stronger"	July 2007	August 2018
Take That	"Rule the World"	October 2007	January 2018
Nickelback	"Rockstar"	November 2007	July 2019
Dizzee Rascal featuring Calvin Harris and Chrom3	"Dance wiv Me"	June 2008	March 2021
The Killers	"Human"	October 2008	July 2019
Beyoncé	"If I Were a Boy"	October 2008	July 2019
Kings of Leon	"Use Somebody"	December 2008	June 2016
Tinchy Stryder featuring N-Dubz	"Number 1"	April 2009	February 2023
Lady Gaga	"Paparazzi"	July 2009	September 2024
Lady Gaga	"Born this Way"	February 2011	August 2022
Lady Gaga	"Always Remember Us This Way"	October 2018	July 2023
Lady Gaga featuring Beyoncé	"Telephone"	November 2009	March 2022
Owl City	"Fireflies"	July 2009	May 2019
Tinie Tempah	"Pass Out"	April 2010	October 2018
Christina Perri	"Jar of Hearts"	July 2010	March 2018
Cee Lo Green	"Forget You"	October 2010	May 2018
Jessie J featuring B.o.B	"Price Tag"	January 2011	July 2014
Pitbull featuring Ne-Yo, Afrojack & Nayer	"Give Me Everything"	April 2011	March 2018
Foster the People	"Pumped Up Kicks"	June 2011	April 2019
Avicii	"Levels"	November 2011	June 2019
Nicki Minaj	"Starships"	February 2012	October 2017
fun. featuring Janelle Monáe	"We Are Young"	April 2012	August 2015
The Lumineers	"Ho Hey"	June 2012	August 2017
Rudimental featuring John Newman	"Feel the Love"	June 2012	December 2017
Maroon 5 featuring Wiz Khalifa	"Payphone"	June 2012	May 2019
The Script featuring will.i.am	"Hall of Fame"	September 2012	March 2018
Mumford & Sons	"I Will Wait"	September 2012	July 2019
Swedish House Mafia featuring John Martin	"Don't You Worry Child"	October 2012	July 2016
Labrinth featuring Emeli Sandé	"Beneath Your Beautiful"	October 2012	January 2018
Pink featuring Nate Ruess	"Just Give Me a Reason"	October 2012	August 2018
Rudimental featuring Ella Eyre	"Waiting All Night"	April 2013	June 2018
Naughty Boy featuring Sam Smith	"La La La"	May 2013	November 2015
Ellie Goulding	"Burn"	August 2013	January 2019
Avicii	"Hey Brother"	September 2013	April 2019
Eminem featuring Rihanna	"The Monster"	October 2013	November 2018
Pitbull featuring Kesha	"Timber"	December 2013	October 2016
Idina Menzel	"Let It Go"	December 2013	February 2017
Ella Henderson	"Ghost"	June 2014	October 2015
Ed Sheeran	"I See Fire"	November 2013	March 2021
Ed Sheeran	"Dive"	March 2017	March 2024
Magic!	"Rude"	July 2014	September 2018
Meghan Trainor	"All About That Bass"	September 2014	December 2015
Jessie J, Ariana Grande and Nicki Minaj	"Bang Bang"	October 2014	June 2018
Fetty Wap	"Trap Queen"	December 2014	July 2018
Kygo featuring Conrad Sewell	"Firestone"	December 2014	October 2018
Rihanna, Kanye West & Paul McCartney	"FourFiveSeconds"	January 2015	March 2019
Ellie Goulding	"Love Me like You Do"	February 2015	January 2016
Jack Ü with Justin Bieber	"Where Are Ü Now"	February 2015	May 2017
Maroon 5	"Sugar"	February 2015	September 2017
Years & Years	"King"	March 2015	February 2017
Jess Glynne	"Hold My Hand"	March 2015	April 2017
Wiz Khalifa featuring Charlie Puth	"See You Again"	April 2015	February 2016
Jason Derulo	"Want to Want Me"	April 2015	July 2017
Little Mix	"Black Magic"	May 2015	March 2018
Lost Frequencies	"Are You with Me"	June 2015	November 2017
Calvin Harris and Disciples	"How Deep Is Your Love"	July 2015	March 2017
MNEK & Zara Larsson	"Never Forget You"	July 2015	September 2018
Jess Glynne	"Don't Be So Hard on Yourself"	August 2015	April 2019
DNCE	"Cake by the Ocean"	September 2015	May 2018
Major Lazer featuring Nyla and Fuse ODG	"Light It Up"	November 2015	March 2018
Little Mix	"Secret Love Song"	November 2015	October 2020
Jonas Blue featuring Dakota	"Fast Car"	December 2015	June 2017
Rihanna featuring Drake	"Work"	January 2016	March 2017
Alan Walker	"Faded"	January 2016	January 2019
The Chainsmokers featuring Daya	"Don't Let Me Down"	February 2016	July 2017
Kungs vs. Cookin' on 3 Burners	"This Girl"	February 2016	March 2018
Drake featuring Rihanna	"Too Good"	May 2016	December 2017
Ariana Grande featuring Nicki Minaj	"Side to Side"	May 2016	June 2019
Jonas Blue featuring JP Cooper	"Perfect Strangers"	June 2016	May 2019
DJ Snake featuring Justin Bieber	"Let Me Love You"	August 2016	November 2017
Neiked featuring Dyo	"Sexual"	August 2016	June 2018
Little Mix	"Shout Out to My Ex"	October 2016	February 2018
Little Mix	"Touch"	November 2016	August 2018
Little Mix	"Power"	May 2017	January 2020
Martin Jensen	"Solo Dance"	November 2016	April 2019
Jax Jones featuring Raye	"You Don't Know Me"	December 2016	May 2018
Portugal. The Man	"Feel It Still"	March 2017	November 2018
DJ Khaled featuring Justin Bieber, Quavo, Chance the Rapper & Lil Wayne	"I'm the One"	April 2017	November 2018
Jonas Blue featuring William Singe	"Mama"	May 2017	January 2019
Marshmello featuring Khalid	"Silence"	August 2017	May 2019
Rita Ora	"Anywhere"	October 2017	July 2019
Drake	"God's Plan"	January 2018	June 2018
Lil Dicky featuring Chris Brown	"Freaky Friday"	March 2018	July 2020
Anne-Marie	"2002"	April 2018	May 2019
Tyga featuring Offset	"Taste"	May 2018	June 2020
Ava Max	"Sweet but Psycho"	August 2018	May 2019
Calvin Harris & Sam Smith	"Promises"	August 2018	June 2019
Lil Nas X	"Old Town Road"	March 2019	August 2019
Coldplay	"Clocks"	November 2004	May 2024
Ariana Grande	"Into You"	March 2016	February 2020
Saint Jhn	"Roses"	September 2019	August 2020
Rihanna featuring Drake	"What's My Name?"	November 2010	October 2020
Ariana Grande	"7 Rings"	January 2019	October 2020
Dave featuring Fredo	"Funky Friday"	October 2018	July 2021
CNCO & Little Mix	"Reggaetón Lento (Remix)"	August 2017	September 2021
Ed Sheeran featuring Camila Cabello & Cardi B	"South Of The Border"	July 2019	October 2021
The Kid Laroi and Justin Bieber	"Stay"	July 2021	March 2022
Doja Cat	"Say So"	November 2019	March 2022
Oasis	"Champagne Supernova"	May 1996	March 2022
Stormzy	"Big for Your Boots"	November 2017	May 2022
Bruno Mars	"Marry You"	October 2010	May 2022
Rihanna	"Take a Bow"	June 2008	June 2022
MK & Becky Hill	"Piece of Me"	February 2016	October 2022
Icona Pop featuring Charli XCX	"I Love It"	July 2013	December 2022
Rihanna	"Don't Stop the Music"	June 2007	March 2023
Harry Styles	"Sign of the Times"	April 2017	September 2021
Burna Boy	"Last Last"	May 2022	July 2024
ABBA	"Mamma Mia"	August 1975	September 2024
ABBA	"Gimme! Gimme! Gimme! (A Man After Midnight)"	October 1979	September 2024
Coldplay	"Christmas Lights"	December 2010	December 2024
Coldplay & Rihanna	"Princess of China"	February 2012	August 2024
Coldplay	"Sparks"	July 2000	December 2025
Ed Sheeran and Elton John	" Merry Christmas"	December 2021	December 2025
Sabrina Carpenter	" Manchild"	June 2025	June 2026
Ed Sheeran	"Give Me Love"	September 2011	October 2026

== Artists with the most Platinum singles ==
The artist with the most Platinum singles in the UK is Ed Sheeran, with 53.

Artist	Platinum
Ed Sheeran	53
Drake	45
Rihanna	37
Taylor Swift	29
Eminem	28
Calvin Harris	26
Justin Bieber	26
David Guetta	23
Coldplay	23
Beyoncé	21
Lady Gaga	21
Kanye West	20
The Weeknd	20
Ariana Grande	19
Chris Brown	19
Little Mix	19
Katy Perry	18
Adele	18
Bruno Mars	17
Nicki Minaj	17
Sam Smith	16
Jason Derulo	16
Michael Jackson	16
Dua Lipa	16
Oasis	15
Queen	15
Elton John	15
Billie Eilish	15
Dave	14
Arctic Monkeys	14
Justin Timberlake	14
Post Malone	13
Flo Rida	13
Pink	13
One Direction	13
Ellie Goulding	13
Maroon 5	12
Jess Glynne	12
Sia	12
Rita Ora	12
Becky Hill	12
Kendrick Lamar	12
Khalid	11
Stormzy	11
Usher	11
Avicii	11
James Arthur	11
Harry Styles	11
Travis Scott	11
Take That	10
Sean Paul	10
George Ezra	10
Pitbull	10
Jay-Z	10
Miley Cyrus	10

== Platinum awards ==
These lists also include any song that appears above in the lists of multi-Platinum awards. Any certifications made since July 2014 include streaming regardless of the release date and are listed separately. The last song to be certified Platinum on sales or shipments only was "Brimful of Asha" by Cornershop, which was remixed by Norman Cook and reached number one in February 1998. It was certified Platinum on 13 June 2014.

=== Released before 2000 (sales or shipments only) ===
Artist	Song	Date released	Date certified Platinum
Bon Jovi	"Always"	January 1995	July 2013
Deep Blue Something	"Breakfast at Tiffany's"	January 1995	July 2013
The Prodigy	"Firestarter"	March 1996	March 2014
Aqua	"Doctor Jones"	January 1997	July 2013
Eternal featuring Bebe Winans	"I Wanna Be the Only One"	October 1997	July 2013
Baz Luhrmann	"Everybody's Free (To Wear Sunscreen)"	January 1998	July 2013
Christina Aguilera	"Genie in a Bottle"	January 1999	July 2013
Cornershop	"Brimful of Asha"	January 1998	June 2014
Macy Gray	"I Try"	January 1999	July 2013
Ronan Keating	"When You Say Nothing at All"	July 1999	July 2013
Alice DeeJay	"Better Off Alone"	July 1999	May 2000
R. Kelly	"If I Could Turn Back the Hands of Time"	October 1999	January 2000
Artful Dodger	"Re-Rewind (The Crowd Say Bo Selecta)"	November 1999	March 2000

=== Released before 2000 (including streaming) ===
Artist	Song	Date released	Date certified Platinum
Ben E. King	"Stand by Me"	April 1961	August 2018
Otis Redding	"(Sittin' On) The Dock of the Bay"	January 1968	May 2019
The Jackson 5	"I Want You Back"	October 1969	May 2018
Elton John	"Your Song"	October 1970	January 2019
Stevie Wonder	"Superstition"	October 1972	August 2016†
Wizzard	"I Wish It Could Be Christmas Everyday"	December 1973	December 2017
Lynyrd Skynyrd	"Sweet Home Alabama"	June 1974	September 2017
Fleetwood Mac	"Go Your Own Way"	December 1976	September 2017
Fleetwood Mac	"The Chain"	February 1977	April 2018
Electric Light Orchestra	"Mr. Blue Sky"	January 1978	November 2017
Bob Marley and the Wailers	"Three Little Birds"	September 1980	August 2018
Dolly Parton	"9 to 5"	November 1980	August 2018
Phil Collins	"In the Air Tonight"	January 1981	March 2018
Survivor	"Eye of the Tiger"	May 1982	December 2014†
Eurythmics	"Sweet Dreams (Are Made of This)"	January 1983	July 2018
Michael Jackson	"Beat It"	February 1983	December 2018
Michael Jackson	"Billie Jean"	March 1983	March 2017
New Order	"Blue Monday"	March 1983	June 2019
Michael Jackson	"Thriller"	November 1983	February 2018
Kenny Loggins	"Footloose"	January 1984	December 2018
Simple Minds	"Don't You (Forget About Me)"	April 1985	April 2019
Paul Simon	"You Can Call Me Al"	September 1986	February 2019
U2	"With or Without You"	March 1987	September 2017
Whitney Houston	"I Wanna Dance with Somebody (Who Loves Me)"	May 1987	February 2018
Michael Jackson	"Man in the Mirror"	January 1988	July 2016
Fleetwood Mac	"Everywhere"	March 1988	January 2018
The Proclaimers	"I'm Gonna Be (500 Miles)"	August 1988	February 2018
Red Hot Chili Peppers	"Under the Bridge"	March 1992	May 2017
Radiohead	"Creep"	September 1992	April 2018
Warren G featuring Nate Dogg	"Regulate"	April 1994	April 2018
Seal	"Kiss from a Rose"	July 1994	April 2017
The Notorious B.I.G.	"Juicy"	August 1994	November 2018
The Notorious B.I.G.	"Big Poppa"	December 1994	February 2022
Shaggy	"Boombastic"	June 1995	August 2016
Take That	"Never Forget"	July 1995	April 2018
Oasis	"Roll with It"	August 1995	June 2017
Blur	"Country House"	August 1995	August 2017
Michael Jackson	"You Are Not Alone"	August 1995	August 2018
Faithless	"Insomnia"	November 1995	July 2015
Celine Dion	"Because You Loved Me"	February 1996	May 2018
2Pac featuring Dr. Dre and Roger Troutman	"California Love"	April 1996	May 2022
George Michael	"Fastlove"	April 1996	April 2019
2Pac	"Hit 'Em Up"	June 1996	January 2024
Blackstreet featuring Dr. Dre & Queen Pen	"No Diggity"	September 1996	April 2016
En Vogue	"Don't Let Go (Love)"	October 1996	June 2016
Gala	"Freed from Desire"	January 1997	July 2015
The Notorious B.I.G.	"Hypnotize"	March 1997	August 2018
Blur	"Song 2"	April 1997	October 2017
Dario G	"Sunchyme"	June 1997	July 2014
Backstreet Boys	"Everybody (Backstreet's Back)"	June 1997	February 2017
The Notorious B.I.G. featuring Puff Daddy and Mase	"Mo Money Mo Problems"	July 1997	February 2021
Backstreet Boys	"As Long As You Love Me"	September 1997	July 2017
Eagle-Eye Cherry	"Save Tonight"	October 1997	October 2016
Green Day	"Good Riddance (Time of Your Life)"	October 1997	December 2017
Lighthouse Family	"High"	January 1998	September 2018
Spice Girls	"Stop	March 1998	August 2020
2Pac featuring Talent	"Changes"	October 1998	November 2017
Jay-Z	"Hard Knock Life (Ghetto Anthem)"	October 1998	April 2022
The Offspring	"Pretty Fly (For a White Guy)"	November 1998	June 2016
Eminem	"My Name Is"	January 1999	April 2017
Whitney Houston	"It's Not Right but It's Okay"	January 1999	April 2017
New Radicals	"You Get What You Give"	March 1999	October 2016
Backstreet Boys	"I Want It That Way"	May 1999	April 2016
Sixpence None the Richer	"Kiss Me"	May 1999	June 2018
Whitney Houston	"My Love Is Your Love"	August 1999	April 2016
Shania Twain	"Man! I Feel Like a Woman!"	September 1999	May 2018
Dr. Dre featuring Snoop Dogg	"Still D.R.E."	September 1999	March 2017
Westlife	"Flying Without Wings"	October 1999	March 2019
Robbie Williams	"She's the One"/"It's Only Us"	November 1999	October 2018
Westlife	"I Have a Dream/Seasons in the Sun"	December 1999	N/A
Naughty Boy featuring Beyoncé, Arrow Benjamin	"Runnin' Lose it All"	September 2015	May 2024

†Pre-1989 release certified Platinum for digital sales since 2005.

=== Released between 2000 and 2009 (sales or shipments only) ===
Artist	Song	Date released	Date certified Platinum
All Saints	"Pure Shores"	February 2000	March 2000
Fragma	"Toca's Miracle"	April 2000	August 2013
Sonique	"It Feels So Good"	May 2000	June 2000
Robbie Williams	"Rock DJ"	July 2000	October 2000
Spiller	"Groovejet (If This Ain't Love)"	August 2000	July 2013
Baha Men	"Who Let the Dogs Out?"	October 2000	December 2000
LeAnn Rimes	"Can't Fight the Moonlight"	November 2000	July 2013
Eminem	"Stan"	November 2000	December 2000
S Club 7	"Never Had a Dream Come True"	November 2000	July 2013
Bob the Builder	"Can We Fix It?"	December 2000	December 2000
Atomic Kitten	"Whole Again"	January 2001	March 2001
Westlife	"Uptown Girl"	March 2001	March 2001
Hear'say	"Pure and Simple"	March 2001	March 2001
S Club 7	"Don't Stop Movin'"	April 2001	June 2001
Shakira	"She Wolf"	August 2009	August 2023
Shakira and Beyoncé	"Beautiful Liar"	April 2007	April 2020
DJ Ötzi	"Hey Baby"	September 2001	October 2001
Eminem	"Without Me"	May 2002	July 2013
Elvis vs. JXL	"A Little Less Conversation"	June 2002	August 2002
Las Ketchup	"The Ketchup Song (Aserejé)"	October 2002	January 2003
Eminem	"Lose Yourself"	October 2002	July 2013
DJ Sammy & Yanou featuring Do	"Heaven"	November 2002	July 2013
Girls Aloud	"Sound of the Underground"	December 2002	March 2003
Evanescence	"Bring Me to Life"	January 2003	July 2013
Gareth Gates	"Spirit in the Sky"	March 2003	May 2003
Will Young	"Leave Right Now"	December 2003	July 2013
Michael Andrews featuring Gary Jules	"Mad World"	December 2003	January 2004
Eamon	"Fuck It (I Don't Want You Back)"	April 2004	July 2013
Nickelback	"How You Remind Me"	November 2004	August 2013
Vengaboys	"Boom, Boom, Boom, Boom!!"	November 2004	November 2013
Brandy & Monica	"The Boy Is Mine"	November 2004	August 2013
Sarah Brightman & Andrea Bocelli	"Time to Say Goodbye (Con te partirò)"	March 2005	August 2013
James Blunt	"You're Beautiful"	May 2005	July 2013
Madonna	"Hung Up"	November 2005	July 2013
Shayne Ward	"That's My Goal"	December 2005	January 2006
Take That	"Patience"	November 2006	July 2013
Leona Lewis	"A Moment Like This"	December 2006	January 2007
Timbaland featuring OneRepublic	"Apologize"	January 2007	July 2013
Mika	"Grace Kelly"	January 2007	March 2014
Rihanna featuring Jay-Z	"Umbrella"	March 2007	December 2008
The Pussycat Dolls featuring Busta Rhymes	"Don't Cha"	September 2007	May 2014
Duffy	"Mercy"	February 2008	July 2013
Flo Rida featuring T-Pain	"Low"	March 2008	July 2013
Elbow	"One Day Like This"	March 2008	December 2013
Estelle featuring Kanye West	"American Boy"	March 2008	July 2013
Dizzee Rascal featuring Calvin Harris and Chrome	"Dance wiv Me"	July 2008	January 2009
Katy Perry	"I Kissed a Girl"	September 2008	September 2010
Beyoncé	"Single Ladies (Put a Ring on It)"	October 2008	July 2013
Leona Lewis	"Run"	November 2008	July 2013
James Morrison featuring Nelly Furtado	"Broken Strings"	December 2008	July 2013
La Roux	"In for the Kill"	March 2009	August 2009
Tinchy Stryder featuring N-Dubz	"Number 1"	April 2009	July 2013
Dizzee Rascal featuring Armand Van Helden	"Bonkers"	May 2009	July 2013
The Black Eyed Peas	"Boom Boom Pow"	May 2009	January 2010
David Guetta featuring Kelly Rowland	"When Love Takes Over"	June 2009	July 2013
Kesha	"Tik Tok"	August 2009	July 2013
David Guetta featuring Akon	"Sexy Chick"	August 2009	September 2010
The Black Eyed Peas	"Meet Me Halfway"	September 2009	July 2013
Alexandra Burke featuring Flo Rida	"Bad Boys"	October 2009	January 2010
Cheryl	"Fight for This Love"	October 2009	May 2010
Joe McElderry	"The Climb"	December 2009	January 2010
Alicia Keys	"Empire State of Mind (Part II) Broken Down"	December 2009	July 2013

=== Released between 2000 and 2009 (including streaming) ===
Artist	Song	Date released	Date certified Platinum
Darude	"Sandstorm"	January 2000	September 2015
Dr. Dre featuring Eminem	"Forgot About Dre"	January 2000	April 2018
Limp Bizkit	"Break Stuff"	May 2000	January 2024
S Club 7	"Reach"	May 2000	June 2015
Dr. Dre featuring Snoop Dogg	"The Next Episode"	May 2000	July 2017
Red Hot Chili Peppers	"Californication"	May 2000	March 2018
Limp Bizkit	"Take A Look Around"	July 2000	February 2023
Destiny's Child	"Independent Women"	September 2000	November 2017
Modjo	"Lady (Hear Me Tonight)"	September 2000	March 2018
Eminem	"The Way I Am"	October 2000	March 2022
U2	"Beautiful Day"	October 2000	April 2019
Daft Punk	"One More Time"	November 2000	December 2018
Feeder	"Buck Rogers"	January 2001	July 2024
Limp Bizkit	"Rollin' (Air Raid Vehicle)"	January 2001	July 2018
Afroman	"Because I Got High"	January 2001	October 2015
Papa Roach	"Last Resort"	February 2001	November 2018
Train	"Drops of Jupiter (Tell Me)"	February 2001	June 2017
Gorillaz	"Clint Eastwood"	March 2001	September 2015
Christina Aguilera, Lil' Kim, Mya, Pink & Missy Elliott	"Lady Marmalade"	March 2001	October 2015
The Calling	"Wherever You Will Go"	June 2001	February 2016
D12	"Purple Pills"	July 2001	May 2023
So Solid Crew	"21 Seconds"	August 2001	October 2020
Daniel Bedingfield	"Gotta Get Thru This"	November 2001	September 2014
Vanessa Carlton	"A Thousand Miles"	February 2002	November 2017
Westlife	"World of Our Own"	February 2002	March 2022
Eminem featuring Nate Dogg	"'Till I Collapse"	May 2002	October 2018
Avril Lavigne	"Complicated"	September 2002	December 2018
Eminem	"Cleanin' Out My Closet"	September 2002	October 2022
Daniel Bedingfield	"If You're Not the One"	November 2002	August 2014
Eminem featuring Dina Rae	"Superman"	January 2003	March 2023
50 Cent	"Many Men (Wish Death)"	February 2003	February 2023
Eminem	"Sing For The Moment"	February 2003	May 2022
50 Cent	"21 Questions"	March 2003	January 2021
Beyoncé featuring Jay-Z	"Crazy in Love"	June 2003	March 2015
50 Cent	"P.I.M.P."	August 2003	September 2020
Dido	"White Flag"	September 2003	June 2018
Kanye West	"Through The Wire"	September 2003	November 2023
The Darkness	"Christmas Time (Don't Let the Bells End)"	December 2003	December 2018
Snow Patrol	"Run"	January 2004	June 2018
Usher featuring Lil' Jon & Ludacris	"Yeah!"	February 2004	August 2014
Kanye West featuring Syleena Johnson	"All Falls Down"	March 2004	July 2021
Anastacia	"Left Outside Alone"	March 2004	February 2022
D12	"My Band"	March 2004	November 2022
Jay-Z	"99 Problems"	April 2004	January 2020
Green Day	"American Idiot"	August 2004	June 2018
Snoop Dogg featuring Pharrell	"Drop It Like It's Hot"	September 2004	August 2019
Eminem	"Just Lose It"	September 2004	January 2023
Blu Cantrell featuring Sean Paul	"Breathe"	November 2004	July 2017
Kaiser Chiefs	"I Predict a Riot"	November 2004	July 2018
The Game featuring 50 Cent	"How We Do"	November 2004	October 2022
Jay-Z and Linkin Park	"Numb/Encore"	December 2004	February 2015
The Game featuring 50 Cent	"Hate It or Love It"	January 2005	April 2020
2Pac featuring Elton John	"Ghetto Gospel"	January 2005	July 2018
50 Cent featuring Olivia	"Candy Shop"	February 2005	November 2018
Akon featuring Styles P	"Locked Up"	February 2005	June 2023
Stereophonics	"Dakota"	February 2005	December 2016
McFly	"All About You/You've Got a Friend"	March 2005	June 2017
Eminem	"Like Toy Soldiers"	March 2005	November 2019
Eminem	"Mockingbird"	April 2005	August 2018
Akon	"Lonely"	May 2005	March 2020
50 Cent	"Just A Lil Bit"	May 2005	January 2023
Daniel Powter	"Bad Day"	July 2005	October 2016
Kelly Clarkson	"Since U Been Gone"	July 2005	October 2018
Green Day	"Wake Me Up When September Ends"	August 2005	March 2019
Rihanna	"Pon de Replay"	August 2005	July 2019
Kanye West featuring Jamie Foxx	"Gold Digger"	September 2005	July 2014
The Notorious B.I.G. featuring Diddy, Nelly, Jagged Edge and Avery Storm	"Nasty Girl"	October 2005	August 2019
Westlife	"You Raise Me Up"	October 2005	December 2017
Kelly Clarkson	"Because of You"	November 2005	June 2018
Eminem	"When I'm Gone"	December 2005	October 2019
Kanye West featuring Lupe Fiasco	"Touch the Sky"	January 2006	February 2021
Jack Johnson	"Better Together"	January 2006	August 2018
Corrine Bailey Rae	"Put Your Records On"	February 2006	December 2018
Panic! at the Disco	"I Write Sins Not Tragedies"	February 2006	January 2019
Ne-Yo	"So Sick"	March 2006	May 2018
Eminem featuring Nate Dogg	"Shake That"	April 2006	December 2021
Rihanna	"SOS"	April 2006	June 2022
Plain White T's	"Hey There Delilah"	May 2006	June 2016
The Pussycat Dolls featuring Snoop Dogg	"Buttons"	June 2006	June 2023
Scissor Sisters	"I Don't Feel Like Dancin'"	July 2006	July 2014
Rihanna	"Unfaithful"	July 2006	June 2018
Justin Timberlake	"SexyBack"	August 2006	March 2016
Akon featuring Eminem	"Smack That"	September 2006	March 2018
Beyoncé	"Irreplaceable"	October 2006	November 2016
Razorlight	"America"	October 2006	October 2017
Amy Winehouse	"Rehab"	October 2006	December 2017
Justin Timberlake featuring T.I.	"My Love"	November 2006	June 2023
Take That	"Shine"	January 2007	September 2017
Gwen Stefani featuring Akon	"The Sweet Escape"	February 2007	December 2023
Fergie featuring Ludacris	"Glamorous"	March 2007	October 2021
Beyoncé and Shakira	"Beautiful Liar"	April 2007	May 2020
Soulja Boy Tell 'Em	"Crank That (Soulja Boy)"	May 2007	February 2019
Akon	"Don't Matter"	May 2007	October 2023
Kanye West	"Can't Tell Me Nothing"	May 2007	December 2023
Kate Nash	"Foundations"	June 2007	July 2017
Arctic Monkeys	"Fluorescent Adolescent"	July 2007	June 2017
Fergie	"Big Girls Don't Cry"	July 2007	October 2018
50 Cent featuring Justin Timberlake and Timbaland	"Ayo Technology"	July 2007	June 2021
Kanye West	"Stronger"	July 2007	April 2015
Rihanna	"Shut Up and Drive"	August 2007	December 2022
Sugababes	"About You Now"	September 2007	April 2017
Alicia Keys	"No One"	September 2007	February 2018
Rihanna featuring Ne-Yo	"Hate That I Love You"	November 2007	February 2023
Basshunter	"Now You're Gone"	December 2007	September 2015
Adele	"Chasing Pavements"	January 2008	January 2017
Rihanna	"Don't Stop the Music"	February 2008	January 2018
M.I.A.	"Paper Planes"	February 2008	October 2017
Kanye West featuring Chris Martin	"Homecoming"	February 2008	September 2022
Lil Wayne	"Lollipop"	March 2008	February 2024
Chris Brown	"With You"	March 2008	December 2019
Sam Sparro	"Black and Gold"	March 2008	November 2014
Madcon	"Beggin'"	March 2008	February 2019
Kanye West featuring Dwele	"Flashing Lights"	April 2008	November 2022
Madonna featuring Justin Timberlake & Timbaland	"4 Minutes"	April 2008	July 2018
Wiley	"Wearing My Rolex"	April 2008	May 2019
Chris Brown	"Forever"	April 2008	February 2020
Rihanna	"Disturbia"	June 2008	September 2016
Jordin Sparks with Chris Brown	"No Air"	July 2008	August 2017
Pink	"So What"	August 2008	July 2014
Ne-Yo	"Miss Independent"	September 2008	August 2018
Akon	"Right Now (Na Na Na)"	September 2008	February 2021
T.I. featuring Rihanna	"Live Your Life"	September 2008	October 2017
MGMT	"Kids"	October 2008	November 2016
Girls Aloud	"The Promise"	October 2008	July 2018
Kanye West	"Heartless"	October 2008	August 2021
Soulja Boy featuring Sammie	"Kiss Me thru the Phone"	November 2008	February 2021
Lily Allen	"The Fear"	December 2008	January 2016
Akon featuring Colby O'Donis and Kardinall Offishall	"Beautiful"	January 2009	February 2020
A.R. Rahman & The Pussycat Dolls featuring Nicole Scherzinger	"Jai Ho! (You Are My Destiny)"	March 2009	June 2015
T.I. featuring Justin Timberlake	"Dead and Gone"	March 2009	December 2023
Calvin Harris	"I'm Not Alone"	April 2009	January 2016
Daniel Merriweather	"Red"	May 2009	February 2018
Keri Hilson featuring Kanye West & Ne-Yo	"Knock You Down"	May 2009	August 2018
Jay Sean featuring Lil Wayne	"Down"	May 2009	July 2019
La Roux	"Bulletproof"	June 2009	January 2017
JLS	"Beat Again"	June 2009	June 2017
The Temper Trap	"Sweet Disposition"	July 2009	November 2014
Iyaz	"Replay"	July 2009	January 2016
Beyoncé	"Sweet Dreams"	July 2009	June 2018
Train	"Hey, Soul Sister"	August 2009	November 2015
Lady Antebellum	"Need You Now"	August 2009	January 2016
Jay-Z featuring Rihanna and Kanye West	"Run This Town"	August 2009	December 2019
Dizzee Rascal featuring Chrom3	"Holiday"	August 2009	February 2019
Drake, Kanye West, Lil Wayne and Eminem	"Forever"	August 2009	June 2021
3OH!3 featuring Katy Perry	"Starstrukk"	September 2009	January 2015
Taio Cruz	"Break Your Heart"	September 2009	June 2018
Michael Bublé	"Haven't Met You Yet"	October 2009	June 2016
Chipmunk	"Oopsy Daisy"	October 2009	December 2021
Mumford & Sons	"The Cave"	October 2009	July 2017
Chase & Status featuring Plan B	"End Credits"	October 2009	January 2019
Glee Cast	"Don't Stop Believin'"	November 2009	October 2018
Lady Gaga	"Alejandro"	November 2009	August 2020
Lady Gaga	"LoveGame"	March 2009	February 2025
Coldplay	"Speed of Sound"	April 2005	December 2024
Coldplay	"Trouble"	October 2000	January 2025
Coldplay	"In My Place"	August 2002	August 2025

=== Released between 2010 and 2014 (sales or shipments only) ===
Artist	Song	Date released	Date certified Platinum
Helping Haiti	"Everybody Hurts"	February 2010	February 2010
Rihanna	"Rude Boy"	February 2010	July 2013
Plan B	"She Said"	February 2010	July 2013
Aloe Blacc	"I Need a Dollar"	March 2010	July 2013
Usher featuring will.i.am	"OMG"	March 2010	July 2013
Katy Perry featuring Snoop Dogg	"California Gurls"	June 2010	October 2010
Eminem featuring Rihanna	"Love The Way You Lie"	June 2010	July 2013
B.o.B featuring Hayley Williams	"Airplanes"	July 2010	July 2013
Yolanda Be Cool vs. DCUP	"We No Speak Americano"	July 2010	July 2013
Flo Rida featuring David Guetta	"Club Can't Handle Me"	August 2010	July 2013
Taio Cruz	"Dynamite"	September 2010	July 2013
Rihanna	"Only Girl (In The World)"	September 2010	January 2011
Tinie Tempah featuring Eric Turner	"Written in the Stars"	September 2010	July 2013
Helping Haiti	"Everybody Hurts"	October 2010	July 2013
The Black Eyed Peas	"The Time (Dirty Bit)"	November 2010	July 2013
Ellie Goulding	"Your Song"	November 2010	July 2013
Rihanna featuring Drake	"What's My Name?"	November 2010	March 2011
Matt Cardle	"When We Collide"	December 2010	July 2013
Rihanna	"S&M"	January 2011	July 2013
Snoop Dogg	"Sweat"	January 2011	July 2013
Jessie J	"Do It Like a Dude"	January 2011	July 2013
Chris Brown featuring Benny Benassi	"Beautiful People"	February 2011	July 2013
Jennifer Lopez featuring Pitbull	"On the Floor"	March 2011	July 2013
Alex Clare	"Too Close"	April 2011	July 2013
Bruno Mars	"The Lazy Song"	May 2011	July 2013
Example	"Changed the Way You Kiss Me"	June 2011	July 2013
Jessie J	"Domino"	August 2011	July 2013
Olly Murs featuring Rizzle Kicks	"Heart Skips a Beat"	August 2011	July 2013
LMFAO	"Sexy and I Know It"	September 2011	July 2013
Labrinth featuring Tinie Tempah	"Earthquake"	October 2011	July 2013
Flo Rida	"Good Feeling"	November 2011	July 2013
Olly Murs	"Dance with Me Tonight"	December 2011	July 2013
Military Wives and Gareth Malone	"Wherever You Are"	December 2011	July 2013
Rizzle Kicks	"Mama Do the Hump"	December 2011	July 2013
Flo Rida featuring Sia	"Wild Ones"	January 2012	July 2013
Emeli Sandé	"Next to Me"	April 2012	July 2013
Flo Rida	"Whistle"	April 2012	July 2013
Florence + the Machine	"Spectrum (Say My Name)"	July 2012	July 2013
Rihanna	"Diamonds"	September 2012	February 2013
Macklemore & Ryan Lewis featuring Wanz	"Thrift Shop"	September 2012	June 2013
Taylor Swift	"I Knew You Were Trouble"	October 2012	July 2013
Robbie Williams	"Candy"	October 2012	July 2013
Adele	"Skyfall"	October 2012	January 2013
will.i.am and Britney Spears	"Scream & Shout"	November 2012	July 2013
Olly Murs featuring Flo Rida	"Troublemaker"	November 2012	July 2013
Rihanna featuring Mikky Ekko	"Stay"	November 2012	August 2013
Justin Timberlake	"Mirrors"	February 2013	July 2013
Robin Thicke featuring T.I. and Pharrell Williams	"Blurred Lines"	March 2013	July 2013
John Newman	"Love Me Again"	June 2013	December 2013
Ellie Goulding	"How Long Will I Love You?"	August 2013	June 2014
Eminem featuring Rihanna	"The Monster"	October 2013	March 2014

=== Released between 2010 and 2014 (including streaming) ===
All certifications since July 2014 include streaming.

Artist	Song	Date released	Date certified Platinum
N-Dubz featuring Mr Hudson	"Playing With Fire"	January 2010	June 2021
Biffy Clyro	"Many of Horror"	January 2010	January 2019
Florence + the Machine and Dizzee Rascal	"You Got The Dirtee Love"	February 2010	September 2024
Ellie Goulding	"Starry Eyed"	February 2010	March 2017
Justin Bieber featuring Ludacris	"Baby"	March 2010	July 2017
Edward Maya & Vika Jigulina	"Stereo Love"	May 2010	December 2018
Eminem	"Not Afraid"	June 2010	January 2015
Example	"Kickstarts"	June 2010	January 2017
Shakira featuring Freshlyground	"Waka Waka (This Time for Africa)"	June 2010	August 2018
Swedish House Mafia featuring Pharrell Williams	"One (Your Name)"	July 2010	November 2017
Eliza Doolittle	"Pack Up"	July 2010	November 2017
Usher featuring Pitbull	"DJ Got Us Fallin' in Love"	July 2010	January 2019
DJ Fresh featuring Ce'cile or Ms. Dynamite	"Gold Dust"	August 2010	May 2016
Travie McCoy featuring Bruno Mars	"Billionaire"	August 2010	December 2016
Kanye West	"Power"	August 2010	May 2018
Kanye West featuring Pusha T	"Runaway"	October 2010	November 2023
Drake	"Best I Ever Had"	October 2010	September 2022
Take That	"The Flood"	November 2010	May 2015
David Guetta featuring Rihanna	"Who's That Chick?"	November 2010	March 2016
Far East Movement featuring The Cataracs & Dev	"Like a G6"	November 2010	March 2017
Eminem featuring Lil Wayne	"No Love"	November 2010	December 2023
Kanye West featuring Rihanna and Kid Cudi	"All of the Lights"	November 2010	December 2017
Pink	"Raise Your Glass"	November 2010	March 2018
Gyptian	"Hold You"	November 2010	October 2018
Nicki Minaj featuring Drake	"Moment 4 Life"	December 2010	March 2023
Chase & Status featuring Liam Bailey	"Blind Faith"	January 2011	June 2018
Chris Brown	"Yeah 3x"	January 2011	January 2018
Birdy	"Skinny Love"	February 2011	December 2014
Dr. Dre featuring Eminem and Skylar Grey	"I Need A Doctor"	February 2011	July 2019
Chipmunk featuring Chris Brown	"Champion"	February 2011	March 2022
Katy Perry featuring Kanye West	"E.T."	February 2011	May 2017
Two Door Cinema Club	"What You Know"	February 2011	April 2018
Alexandra Stan	"Mr. Saxobeat"	April 2011	May 2016
Beyoncé	"Run the World (Girls)"	April 2011	April 2018
Nicki Minaj	"Super Bass"	May 2011	July 2014
Lady Gaga	"The Edge of Glory"	May 2011	October 2014
Lady Gaga	"Applause"	August 2013	October 2022
Lady Gaga	"Judas"	April 2011	August 2023
Calvin Harris featuring Kelis	"Bounce"	June 2011	May 2016
David Guetta featuring Nicki Minaj & Flo Rida	"Where Them Girls At"	June 2011	February 2017
Coldplay	"Every Teardrop Is a Waterfall"	June 2011	April 2021
Katy Perry	"Last Friday Night (T.G.I.F.)"	June 2011	November 2017
Rizzle Kicks	"Down with the Trumpets"	June 2011	September 2018
Drake	"Marvins Room"	June 2011	March 2023
DJ Fresh featuring Sian Evans	"Louder"	July 2011	December 2014
Beyoncé	"Best Thing I Never Had"	July 2011	February 2016
The Wanted	"Glad You Came"	July 2011	July 2014
Drake	"Headlines"	August 2011	February 2022
Jay-Z and Kanye West	"Niggas in Paris"	August 2011	July 2014
Calvin Harris	"Feel So Close"	August 2011	September 2015
David Guetta featuring Usher	"Without You"	August 2011	May 2017
Beyoncé	"Love On Top"	August 2011	June 2017
David Guetta featuring Nicki Minaj	"Turn Me On"	August 2011	July 2018
Justin Bieber	"Mistletoe"	October 2011	October 2020
Coldplay	"Charlie Brown"	November 2011	September 2024
Justin Bieber featuring Nicki Minaj	"Beauty and a Beat"	June 2012	December 2021
Taylor Swift	"We Are Never Ever Getting Back Together"	September 2012	July 2014
Taylor Swift featuring Ed Sheeran	"Everything Has Changed"	October 2012	May 2019
Ed Sheeran	"You Need Me, I Don't Need You"	August 2011	November 2017
Ed Sheeran	"Drunk"	September 2011	May 2017
Ed Sheeran	"Small Bump"	September 2011	February 2020
Ed Sheeran	"One"	May 2014	July 2021
Ed Sheeran	"Tenerife Sea"	June 2014	January 2019
Ed Sheeran	"I'm a Mess"	June 2014	November 2021
Ed Sheeran	"Kiss Me"	September 2011	January 2022
Charlene Soraia	"Wherever You Will Go"	September 2011	July 2017
Lana Del Rey	"Video Games"	October 2011	September 2015
Professor Green featuring Emeli Sandé	"Read All About It"	October 2011	April 2015
Kelly Clarkson	"Stronger (What Doesn't Kill You)"	October 2011	April 2017
Florence and the Machine	"Shake It Out"	October 2011	July 2018
One Direction	"Little Things"	November 2011	June 2016
Drake featuring Lil Wayne	"The Motto"	November 2011	August 2021
Rihanna	"Where Have You Been"	November 2011	November 2017
Azealia Banks featuring Lazy Jay	"212"	December 2011	December 2016
Train	"Drive By"	January 2012	December 2014
Jason Mraz	"I Won't Give Up"	January 2012	March 2015
Emeli Sandé	"Read All About It, Pt. III"	February 2012	December 2015
DJ Fresh featuring Rita Ora	"Hot Right Now"	February 2012	August 2016
Emeli Sandé	"Clown"	February 2012	August 2017
Jay-Z and Kanye West featuring Frank Ocean and The-Dream	"No Church in the Wild"	March 2012	July 2022
Ben Howard	"Only Love"	May 2012	June 2018
Rita Ora featuring Tinie Tempah	"R.I.P."	May 2012	August 2018
Maroon 5	"One More Night"	June 2012	June 2018
Stooshe	"Black Heart"	June 2012	April 2019
Chris Brown	"Don't Wake Me Up"	June 2012	August 2020
Wiley featuring Ms D	"Heatwave"	July 2012	September 2017
Of Monsters and Men	"Little Talks"	August 2012	May 2016
Little Mix	"Wings"	August 2012	March 2017
Disclosure featuring Sam Smith	"Latch"	October 2012	February 2015
Calvin Harris featuring Florence Welch	"Sweet Nothing"	October 2012	April 2016
ASAP Rocky featuring Drake, 2 Chainz and Kendrick Lamar	"Fuckin' Problems"	October 2012	April 2020
Wiley featuring Skepta, JME and Ms D	"Can You Hear Me? (Ayayaya)"	October 2012	September 2020
Gabrielle Aplin	"The Power of Love"	November 2012	December 2017
Dizzee Rascal	"Bassline Junkie"	January 2013	December 2022
Drake	"Started From The Bottom"	February 2013	September 2021
Disclosure featuring AlunaGeorge	"White Noise"	February 2013	April 2016
The 1975	"Chocolate"	March 2013	July 2016
Imagine Dragons	"On Top of the World"	March 2013	December 2018
Calvin Harris featuring Ellie Goulding	"I Need Your Love"	April 2013	May 2016
Disclosure featuring Eliza Doolittle	"You & Me"	April 2013	September 2018
Olly Murs	"Dear Darlin'"	May 2013	November 2014
Miley Cyrus	"We Can't Stop"	June 2013	February 2016
Kanye West	"Black Skinhead"	June 2013	November 2018
MKTO	"Classic"	June 2013	February 2019
Drake featuring Majid Jordan	"Hold On, We're Going Home"	August 2013	August 2014
Jason Derulo featuring 2 Chainz	"Talk Dirty"	August 2013	July 2014
Birdy	"Wings"	August 2013	September 2016
Klangkarussell featuring Will Heard	"Sonnentanz (Sun Don't Shine)"	August 2013	March 2018
Kanye West	"Bound 2"	August 2013	October 2022
Miley Cyrus	"Wrecking Ball"	October 2013	November 2015
Lorde	"Royals"	October 2013	August 2014
Eminem	"Rap God"	October 2013	May 2018
Awolnation	"Sail"	October 2013	October 2016
James Blunt	"Bonfire Heart"	October 2013	October 2018
Little Mix	"Salute"	October 2013	June 2021
Jason Derulo	"Trumpets"	November 2013	January 2015
Lily Allen	"Somewhere Only We Know"	November 2013	July 2015
Martin Garrix	"Animals"	November 2013	April 2016
Storm Queen	"Look Right Through"	November 2013	December 2018
Little Mix	"Move"	November 2013	December 2018
Bastille	"Of the Night"	December 2013	August 2016
Nico and Vinz	"Am I Wrong"	January 2014	January 2015
Kiesza	"Hideaway"	February 2014	August 2014
Sam Smith	"Money on My Mind"	February 2014	August 2014
Iggy Azalea featuring Charli XCX	"Fancy"	February 2014	February 2015
A Great Big World and Christina Aguilera	"Say Something"	February 2014	March 2016
Tove Lo featuring Hippie Sabotage	"Stay High"	February 2014	December 2016
5 Seconds of Summer	"She Looks So Perfect"	February 2014	October 2017
Route 94 featuring Jess Glynne	"My Love"	March 2014	July 2014
Calvin Harris	"Summer"	March 2014	October 2014
Duke Dumont featuring Jax Jones	"I Got U"	March 2014	January 2015
Rita Ora	"I Will Never Let You Down"	March 2014	January 2016
Coldplay	"Magic"	March 2014	April 2017
American Authors	"Best Day of My Life"	March 2014	August 2018
Sigma	"Nobody to Love"	April 2014	August 2014
Chris Brown	"Loyal"	April 2014	January 2016
Jason Derulo featuring Snoop Dogg	"Wiggle"	May 2014	April 2020
Paloma Faith	"Only Love Can Hurt Like This"	May 2014	October 2015
Secondcity	"I Wanna Feel"	May 2014	December 2018
Ariana Grande featuring Iggy Azalea	"Problem"	June 2014	April 2015
Oliver Heldens & Becky Hill	"Gecko (Overdrive)"	June 2014	December 2015
The Script	"Superheroes"	July 2014	July 2017
Ariana Grande featuring Zedd	"Break Free"	July 2014	March 2018
George Ezra	"Blame It on Me"	August 2014	May 2015
Lilly Wood and Robin Schulz	"Prayer in C"	August 2014	January 2015
Iggy Azalea featuring Rita Ora	"Black Widow"	August 2014	April 2018
G.R.L.	"Ugly Heart"	August 2014	April 2019
Calvin Harris featuring John Newman	"Blame"	September 2014	March 2015
Sigma featuring Paloma Faith	"Changing"	September 2014	May 2015
One Direction	"Steal My Girl"	September 2014	January 2016
Nicki Minaj featuring Drake, Lil Wayne and Chris Brown	"Only"	October 2014	May 2023
Olly Murs featuring Travie McCoy	"Wrapped Up"	October 2014	April 2017
Olly Murs featuring Demi Lovato	"Up"	November 2014	June 2015
Calvin Harris featuring Ellie Goulding	"Outside"	November 2014	December 2015
Clean Bandit and Jess Glynne	"Real Love"	November 2014	January 2016
Labrinth	"Jealous"	November 2014	July 2018
Ariana Grande	"Santa Tell Me"	November 2014	December 2019
David Guetta featuring Sia	"Bang My Head"	November 2014	October 2020
Ben Haenow	"Something I Need"	December 2014	August 2015
Philip George	"Wish You Were Mine"	December 2014	July 2015
Sam Smith	"Like I Can"	December 2014	September 2015

=== Released since 2015 ===
All of these include streaming.

Artist	Song	Date released	Date certified Platinum
Avicii	"The Nights"	January 2015	November 2015
Meghan Trainor	"Lips Are Movin"	January 2015	May 2019
Rihanna, Kanye West and Paul McCartney	"FourFiveSeconds"	January 2015	May 2015
Rachel Platten	"Fight Song"	February 2015	September 2016
Karen Harding	"Say Something"	February 2015	February 2018
Carly Rae Jepsen	"I Really Like You"	March 2015	September 2017
Kygo featuring Parson James	"Stole the Show"	March 2015	September 2017
Galantis	"Peanut Butter Jelly"	April 2015	April 2017
Jamie Lawson	"Wasn't Expecting That"	April 2015	December 2017
Galantis	"Runaway (U & I)"	May 2015	January 2016
Years & Years	"Shine"	May 2015	February 2016
LunchMoney Lewis	"Bills"	May 2015	December 2018
JME featuring Giggs	"Man Don't Care"	May 2015	August 2020
Tinie Tempah featuring Jess Glynne	"Not Letting Go"	June 2015	March 2016
Sam Feldt featuring Kimberly Anne	"Show Me Love"	June 2015	August 2017
The Chainsmokers featuring Rozes	"Roses"	June 2015	February 2018
Drake	"Hotline Bling"	July 2015	February 2016
One Direction	"Drag Me Down"	July 2015	August 2016
Charlie Puth featuring Meghan Trainor	"Marvin Gaye"	August 2015	January 2016
Sigala	"Easy Love"	August 2015	June 2016
Jess Glynne	"Take Me Home"	August 2015	December 2016
Macklemore & Ryan Lewis featuring Melle Mel, Grandmaster Caz, Kool Moe Dee & Eric Nally	"Downtown"	August 2015	July 2019
Little Mix featuring Sean Paul	"Hair"	August 2015	September 2017
Stormzy	"Shut Up"	September 2015	March 2017
Ellie Goulding	"On My Mind"	September 2015	August 2017
Little Mix	"Love Me Like You"	September 2015	June 2018
Fleur East	"Sax"	October 2015	September 2016
One Direction	"Perfect"	October 2015	June 2017
Dua Lipa	"Be the One"	October 2015	September 2017
KDA featuring Tinie Tempah & Katy B	"Turn the Music Louder (Rumble)"	October 2015	June 2018
One Direction	"History"	November 2015	June 2016
Drake and Future	"Jumpman"	November 2015	July 2018
Sigala featuring Bryn Christopher	"Sweet Lovin'"	November 2015	August 2016
99 Souls featuring Destiny's Child & Brandy	"The Girl Is Mine"	November 2015	September 2016
Little Mix featuring Jason Derulo	"Secret Love Song"	November 2015	September 2016
Adele	"Send My Love (To Your New Lover)"	November 2015	March 2017
Charlie Puth	"One Call Away"	November 2015	May 2018
Craig David & Big Narstie	"When the Bassline Drops"	November 2015	October 2018
Zayn	"Pillowtalk"	January 2016	April 2016
Charlie Puth featuring Selena Gomez	"We Don't Talk Anymore"	January 2016	July 2017
Rihanna	"Needed Me"	January 2016	January 2018
Selena Gomez	"Hands to Myself"	January 2016	September 2018
Christine and the Queens	"Tilted"	January 2016	April 2019
Rihanna featuring Drake	"Work"	January 2016	April 2016
Tinie Tempah featuring Zara Larsson	"Girls Like"	February 2016	July 2016
The 1975	"The Sound"	February 2016	February 2018
Ariana Grande	"Dangerous Woman"	March 2016	May 2018
Kanye West	"Famous"	March 2016	March 2021
Galantis	"No Money"	April 2016	August 2016
Twenty One Pilots	"Ride"	April 2016	January 2019
Drake featuring Wizkid and Kyla	"One Dance"	April 2016	May 2016
Clean Bandit featuring Louisa Johnson	"Tears"	May 2016	October 2016
Drake featuring Rihanna	"Too Good"	May 2016	August 2016
Anne-Marie	"Alarm"	May 2016	May 2017
Dua Lipa	"Hotter than Hell"	May 2016	May 2018
MØ	"Final Song"	May 2016	February 2019
Drake	"Controlla"	June 2016	January 2017
Kanye West	"Father Stretch My Hands, Pt. 1"	June 2016	March 2023
Twenty One Pilots	"Heathens"	June 2016	November 2016
Lil Wayne, Wiz Khalifa, Imagine Dragons, Logic, Ty Dolla Sign & X Ambassadors	"Sucker for Pain"	June 2016	November 2017
Bastille	"Good Grief"	June 2016	December 2017
Hailee Steinfeld & Grey featuring Zedd	"Starving"	July 2016	February 2017
Shawn Mendes	"Mercy"	August 2016	October 2017
Sia featuring Kendrick Lamar	"The Greatest"	September 2016	January 2017
JP Cooper	"September Song"	September 2016	May 2017
Calvin Harris	"My Way"	September 2016	May 2017
Tom Zanetti featuring Sadie Ama	"You Want Me"	September 2016	March 2018
Bruno Mars	"24K Magic"	October 2016	February 2017
Maroon 5 featuring Kendrick Lamar	"Don't Wanna Know"	October 2016	April 2017
Martin Garrix & Bebe Rexha	"In the Name of Love"	October 2016	April 2017
The Vamps & Matoma	"All Night"	October 2016	April 2018
Drake	"Fake Love"	October 2016	June 2017
Dave featuring Drake	"Wanna Know (Remix)"	October 2016	February 2022
Starley	"Call on Me"	November 2016	April 2017
Coldplay	"Everglow"	November 2016	November 2020
Zara Larsson	"I Would Like"	November 2016	May 2017
The Weeknd featuring Daft Punk	"I Feel It Coming"	November 2016	June 2017
Sean Paul featuring Dua Lipa	"No Lie"	November 2016	December 2017
Post Malone featuring Quavo	"Congratulations"	November 2016	January 2018
Little Mix featuring Machine Gun Kelly	"No More Sad Songs"	November 2016	March 2018
Zayn & Taylor Swift	"I Don't Wanna Live Forever"	December 2016	August 2017
The Chainsmokers	"Paris"	January 2017	June 2017
Julia Michaels	"Issues"	January 2017	September 2017
Rag'n'Bone Man	"Skin"	January 2017	September 2017
Martin Garrix & Dua Lipa	"Scared to Be Lonely"	January 2017	September 2017
Kygo & Selena Gomez	"It Ain't Me"	February 2017	June 2017
Jason Derulo featuring Nicki Minaj & Ty Dolla Sign	"Swalla"	February 2017	July 2017
Calvin Harris featuring Frank Ocean & Migos	"Silde"	February 2017	August 2017
Zedd & Alessia Cara	"Stay"	February 2017	August 2017
Anne-Marie	"Ciao Adios"	February 2017	August 2017
Stormzy	"Big for Your Boots"	February 2017	November 2017
Katy Perry featuring Skip Marley	"Chained to the Rhythm"	February 2017	November 2017
Disciples	"On My Mind"	February 2017	March 2018
Stormzy featuring MNEK	"Blinded by Your Grace, Pt. 2"	February 2017	April 2018
Drake	"Passionfruit"	March 2017	July 2017
Maggie Lindemann	"Pretty Girl"	March 2017	September 2017
Rudimental featuring Ed Sheeran	"Lay It All on Me"	September 2015	September 2016
Ed Sheeran	"How Would You Feel (Paean)"	February 2017	January 2019
Ed Sheeran	"What Do I Know?"	March 2017	April 2018
Ed Sheeran	"New Man"	March 2017	May 2018
Ed Sheeran	"Barcelona"	March 2017	August 2019
Ed Sheeran	"Nancy Mulligan"	March 2017	July 2020
Ed Sheeran	"Hearts Don't Break Around Here"	March 2017	June 2022
Ed Sheeran	"Bibia Be Ye Ye"	March 2017	November 2023
Ed Sheeran	"Eraser"	March 2017	December 2023
Ed Sheeran	" 2step"	October 2021	January 2023
Ed Sheeran	"Eyes Closed"	March 2023	December 2023
Ed Sheeran	"Visiting Hours"	August 2021	April 2024
Drake featuring Giggs	"KMT"	March 2017	October 2020
Drake	"Blem"	March 2017	December 2020
Drake	"Teenage Fever"	March 2017	March 2023
Alma	"Chasing Highs"	March 2017	October 2018
Lorde	"Green Light"	March 2017	November 2018
Charlie Puth	"Attention"	April 2017	September 2017
Logic featuring Alessia Cara & Khalid	"1-800-273-8255 (song)"	April 2017	April 2018
Imagine Dragons	"Thunder"	April 2017	June 2018
Cheat Codes featuring Demi Lovato	"No Promises"	April 2017	June 2018
Liam Payne featuring Quavo	"Strip That Down"	May 2017	August 2017
Rita Ora	"Your Song"	May 2017	September 2017
Niall Horan	"Slow Hands"	May 2017	November 2017
Camila Cabello	"Crying in the Club"	May 2017	May 2018
Miley Cyrus	"Malibu"	May 2017	September 2018
Calvin Harris featuring Pharrell Williams, Katy Perry & Big Sean	"Feels"	June 2017	September 2017
Sigala & Ella Eyre	"Came Here for Love"	June 2017	December 2017
J Balvin & Willy William	"Mi Gente"	June 2017	December 2017
Rudimental featuring James Arthur	"Sun Comes Up"	June 2017	April 2018
David Guetta featuring Justin Bieber	"2U"	June 2017	April 2018
Drake	"Signs"	June 2017	October 2020
Justin Bieber and BloodPop	"Friends"	August 2017	March 2019
Cardi B	"Bodak Yellow"	June 2017	May 2019
Demi Lovato	"Sorry Not Sorry"	July 2017	April 2018
James Hype featuring Kelli-Leigh	"More than Friends"	July 2017	September 2018
CNCO & Little Mix	"Reggaetón Lento (Remix)"	August 2017	December 2017
Pink	"What About Us"	August 2017	January 2018
Avicii featuring Rita Ora	"Lonely Together"	August 2017	February 2018
Stefflon Don featuring French Montana	"Hurtin' Me"	August 2017	April 2018
Taylor Swift	"Look What You Made Me Do"	August 2017	June 2018
Zayn featuring Sia	"Dusk Till Dawn"	September 2017	February 2018
MK	"17"	September 2017	April 2018
NF	"Let You Down"	September 2017	April 2018
Clean Bandit featuring Julia Michaels	"I Miss You"	October 2017	March 2018
Hugh Jackman, Keala Settle, Zac Efron & Zendaya	"The Greatest Show"	October 2017	August 2018
Zac Efron & Zendaya	"Rewrite the Stars"	October 2017	August 2018
Bebe Rexha featuring Florida Georgia Line	"Meant to Be"	October 2017	August 2018
Ziv Zaifman, Hugh Jackman & Michelle Williams	"A Million Dreams"	October 2017	October 2018
Selena Gomez & Marshmello	"Wolves"	October 2017	November 2018
Jason Derulo featuring French Montana	"Tip Toe"	November 2017	May 2018
Loud Luxury featuring Brando	"Body"	November 2017	October 2018
Freya Ridings	"Lost Without You"	November 2017	February 2019
Ramz	"Barking"	December 2017	March 2018
Jax Jones featuring Ina Wroldsen	"Breathe"	December 2017	June 2018
Zedd, Maren Morris & Grey	"The Middle"	January 2018	July 2018
Bruno Mars featuring Cardi B	"Finesse"	January 2018	August 2018
Camila Cabello	"Never Be the Same"	January 2018	October 2018
Drake	"God's Plan"	January 2018	March 2018
M.O, Lotto Boyzz and Mr Eazi	"Bad Vibe"	January 2018	November 2018
Justin Timberlake featuring Chris Stapleton	"Say Something"	January 2018	January 2019
BlocBoy JB featuring Drake	"Look Alive"	February 2018	April 2019
Marshmello & Anne-Marie	"Friends"	February 2018	May 2018
Post Malone featuring Ty Dolla Sign	"Psycho"	February 2018	June 2018
Sigala & Paloma Faith	"Lullaby"	February 2018	July 2018
Khalid & Normani	"Love Lies"	February 2018	October 2018
Banx & Ranx and Ella Eyre featuring Yxng Bane	"Answerphone"	March 2018	October 2018
David Guetta & Sia	"Flames"	March 2018	October 2018
XXXTentacion	"Sad!"	March 2018	November 2018
Shawn Mendes	"In My Blood"	March 2018	June 2019
Drake	"Nice For What"	April 2018	June 2018
Clean Bandit featuring Demi Lovato	"Solo"	May 2018	August 2018
Cardi B, Bad Bunny & J Balvin	"I Like It"	May 2018	August 2018
Jess Glynne	"I'll Be There"	May 2018	September 2018
5 Seconds of Summer	"Youngblood"	May 2018	October 2018
Maroon 5 featuring Cardi B	"Girls Like You"	May 2018	October 2018
Years & Years	"If You're Over Me"	May 2018	October 2018
Tiësto & Dzeko featuring Preme & Post Malone	"Jackie Chan"	May 2018	January 2019
Jonas Blue featuring Jack & Jack	"Rise"	May 2018	October 2018
Post Malone	"Better Now"	June 2018	September 2018
Little Mix & Cheat Codes	"Only You"	June 2018	October 2020
Drake and Michael Jackson	"Don't Matter To Me"	July 2018	March 2021
DJ Khaled featuring Justin Bieber, Chance the Rapper and Quavo	"No Brainer"	July 2018	October 2020
Drake	"In My Feelings"	July 2018	September 2018
Ariana Grande	"God Is a Woman"	July 2018	May 2019
Drake	"Nonstop"	July 2018	December 2019
Lil Pump and Kanye West	"I Love It"	September 2018	December 2019
Rita Ora	"Let You Love Me"	September 2018	February 2019
Eminem	"Venom"	September 2018	June 2022
Halsey	"Without Me"	October 2018	February 2019
Jess Glynne	"Thursday"	October 2018	March 2019
Little Mix featuring Nicki Minaj	"Woman Like Me"	October 2018	April 2019
Lady Gaga	"I'll Never Love Again"	October 2018	October 2021
Mark Ronson featuring Miley Cyrus	"Nothing Breaks Like a Heart"	November 2018	May 2019
Eminem featuring Joyner Lucas	"Lucky You"	November 2018	August 2022
Post Malone	"Wow."	December 2018	April 2019
Calvin Harris & Rag'n'Bone Man	"Giant"	January 2019	April 2019
Sam Smith & Normani	"Dancing with a Stranger"	January 2019	May 2019
Meek Mill featuring Drake	"Going Bad"	January 2019	May 2020
Wiley, Stefflon Don and Sean Paul featuring Idris Elba	"Boasty"	January 2019	January 2020
Lauv & Troye Sivan	"I'm So Tired..."	January 2019	October 2020
Ariana Grande	"Break Up with Your Girlfriend, I'm Bored"	February 2019	August 2019
Summer Walker and Drake	"Girls Need Love (Remix)"	February 2019	June 2022
Sigala and Becky Hill	"Wish You Well"	May 2019	January 2020
Chris Brown featuring Drake	"No Guidance"	June 2019	April 2020
Drake featuring Rick Ross	"Money In The Grave"	June 2019	October 2021
Ed Sheeran featuring Chance the Rapper & PnB Rock	"Cross Me"	July 2019	December 2019
220 Kid and Gracey	"Don't Need Love"	December 2019	February 2021
Roddy Ricch	"The Box"	December 2019	April 2020
Future featuring Drake	"Life Is Good"	January 2020	July 2020
Eminem featuring Juice WRLD	"Godzilla"	January 2020	October 2020
Justin Bieber featuring Quavo	"Intentions"	February 2020	October 2020
Drake and Giveon	"Chicago Freestyle"	March 2020	October 2022
Dua Lipa	"Break My Heart"	March 2020	January 2021
Drake	"Toosie Slide"	April 2020	August 2020
Tate McRae	"you broke me first"	April 2020	January 2021
DJ Khaled featuring Drake	"Greece"	July 2020	September 2021
Cardi B featuring Megan Thee Stallion	"WAP"	August 2020	November 2020
Miley Cyrus	"Midnight Sky"	August 2020	February 2021
Internet Money and Gunna featuring Don Toliver and Nav	"Lemonade"	August 2020	January 2021
Drake featuring Lil Durk	"Laugh Now Cry Later"	August 2020	November 2021
Tiësto	"The Business"	September 2020	May 2021
Little Mix	"Sweet Melody"	October 2020	April 2021
Olivia Rodrigo	"Drivers License"	January 2021	March 2021
Nathan Evans, 220 Kid and Billen Ted	"Wellerman"	January 2021	May 2021
Riton and Nightcrawlers featuring Mufasa and Hypeman	"Friday"	January 2021	June 2021
Justin Bieber featuring Daniel Caesar and Giveon	"Peaches"	March 2021	August 2021
Lil Nas X	"Montero (Call Me By Your Name)"	March 2021	June 2021
Russ Millions and Tion Wayne	"Body"	March 2021	July 2021
Doja Cat and SZA	"Kiss Me More"	April 2021	August 2021
Coldplay	"Higher Power"	May 2021	June 2023
Billie Eilish	"Happier Than Ever"	July 2021	March 2022
Joel Corry and Jax Jones featuring Charli XCX and Saweetie	"Out Out"	August 2021	May 2022
Drake featuring Lil Baby	"Girls Want Girls"	September 2021	April 2023
Ed Sheeran	"Overpass Graffiti"	October 2021	June 2022
Lady Gaga	"Million Reasons"	October 2016	October 2022
Ed Sheeran	"Afterglow"	December 2020	December 2022
Future featuring Drake and Tems	"Wait For U"	May 2022	March 2023
Harry Styles	"Late Night Talking"	June 2022	December 2022
Sam Smith and Kim Petras	"Unholy"	September 2022	December 2022
Camila Cabello featuring Ed Sheeran	"Bam Bam"	March 2022	December 2022
Coldplay x BTS	"My Universe"	September 2021	January 2023
Lady Gaga	"Stupid Love"	February 2020	October 2023
Burna Boy featuring Ed Sheeran	"For My Hand"	July 2022	May 2024
Ed Sheeran	"Azizam"	April 2025	October 2025
Lady Gaga	"Abracadabra"	February 2025	December 2025
Coldplay	"Feelslikeimfallinginlove"	June 2024	January 2026
Lady Gaga	"Hold My Hand"	May 2022	March 2026
Ed Sheeran	"Celestial"	November 2022	May 2026
