= I Just Want You to Know =

I Just Want You to Know may refer to:

- "I Just Want You to Know", a song by Relient K from The Nashville Tennis EP, included with The Bird and the Bee Sides
- "I Just Want You to Know", a song by Traffic included with some editions of John Barleycorn Must Die
- I Just Want You to Know, a book by Kate Gosselin

== See also ==
- I Want You to Know (disambiguation)
