= You Want Me (disambiguation) =

"You Want Me" is a 2016 song by Tom Zanetti.

You Want Me may also refer to:

- "You Want Me", a song by Royal Blood from the album Royal Blood, 2014
- "You Want Me", a 2006 song by Chantal Chamandy

== See also ==
- I Want You (disambiguation)
