= Man Up (The Blue Van album) =

Studio album by The Blue Van
- Released: October 27, 2008
- Genres: Blues-rock; Alternative rock
- Label: TVT Records

The Blue Van chronology
Dear Independence (2006)	Man Up (2008)	Love Shot (2010)

Professional ratings
Review scores
Source	Rating
AllMusic	3.5/5 stars

Man Up is the third album by the Danish blues-rock group The Blue Van. It was released on October 27, 2008, in Danish music stores and on iTunes under Iceberg Records.

== Song appearances ==
The song "Silly Boy" was featured in an advertisement for the Samsung T919 Behold. It was also featured in the Showtime's Shameless, and in the movie The First Time during the beginning credits. The song "Man Up" has been featured in the TV series 90210 and a commercial for the eighth season of Scrubs. It also appeared in the soundtrack for the video game, MLB 09: The Show. "Be Home Soon" was used at the end of the pilot for USA Network's Royal Pains. "There Goes My Love" has been featured in the iPad commercial that aired during the Oscars on March 7, 2010.

== Track listing ==
1. Be Home Soon (3:59)
2. Man Up (2:54)
3. Silly Boy (3:19)
4. There Goes My Love (3:01)
5. Lay Me Down And Die (3:23)
6. The Socialite (3:05)
7. In Love With Myself (3:09)
8. Out Of Control (4:03)
9. True (3:25)
10. I'm A Man (3:51)
11. Stop Thinking Of Yourself (2:43)
12. Trees That Resemble (2:17)
13. Put My Name In The Sand (3:54)
14. Young and Proud [Bonus Track] (3:20)
15. I Can Feel It [Bonus Track](3:54)
16. You'll Never Grow Old [Bonus Track] (3:34)
17. Guilty Just As I (New Born Syndrome) [Bonus Track] (3:40)
18. In Our Hearts Tonight [Bonus Track] (1:53)
19. Lay Me Down And Die (Europe Version) [Bonus Track] (3:32)
20. A Don's Life [Hidden Track] (4:31)
