= Quiero =

Quiero (Spanish for "I want" or "I love") may refer to:

- "Quiero" (Anahí song), 2010
- "Quiero" (Jerry Rivera song), 2001
- "Quiero" (Ricardo Arjona song), 2007
- "Quiero" (Selena y Los Dinos song), 1988
- "Quiero", song by Julio Iglesias from the album El Amor (1975)
- "Quiero", song by Shakira from the album Pies Descalzos (1996)
- "Quiero", song by Luis Miguel from the album Amarte Es un Placer (1999)
- "Quiero", song by Miranda! from the album Sin Restricciones (2004)

== See also ==
- Te Quiero (disambiguation)
