= I Want You So Bad (disambiguation) =

"I Want You So Bad" is a 1988 song by Heart.

I Want You So Bad may also refer to:

- "I Want You So Bad" (James Brown song), 1959
- "I Want You So Bad", a song by B.B. King from the album Live & Well, 1969
- "I Want You So Bad", a song by Nicolette Larson from the album All Dressed Up and No Place to Go, 1982
- "I Want You So Bad", a song by Gloria Estefan and Miami Sound Machine from the album Let It Loose, 1987
- "I Want You So Bad", a song by Eamon from the album I Don't Want You Back, 2004
- "I Want You So Bad", a song by Lorraine Crosby from the album Mrs Loud, 2008

== See also ==
- I Want You (disambiguation)
- "I Want You (She's So Heavy)", a Beatles song with repeated lyrics line "I Want You So Bad"
