= Surf City (band) =

New Zealand space rock/shoegaze/indie band

- Origin: Auckland, New Zealand
- Genres: Indie rock, garage rock, psychedelic rock, post-punk revival, space rock, shoegazing, slacker rock, surf rock
- Years active: 2004–present
- Labels: Morr Music, Fire Records, Arch Hill Recordings
- Members: Jamie Kennedy; Davin Stoddard; Logan Collins; Mike Ellis
- Past members: Josh Kennedy

Surf City is a space rock/shoegaze/indie band from Auckland, New Zealand.

== History ==
Surf City was formed in 2004 in Mt Roskill, Auckland. Attention for the band quickly spread overseas, and they were picked up by notable label Morr Music for U.S and German distribution. Music website Stereogum tapped them as a "jangling, uptempo but melancholic form of shoegaze pop". They released a self-titled EP in 2008, a full-length album on Kudos on Fire Records in 2010, and another album in 2013 entitled We Knew It Was Not Going to Be Like This. Their final release was the 2015 album, Jekyll Island.

== Discography ==
Date of Release	Title	Label
2008	Surf City - Surf City EP	Arch Hill Recordings, Morr Music
2010	Kudos	Arch Hill Recordings, Fire Records
2013	We Knew It Was Not Going to Be Like This	Fire Records
2015	Jekyll Island	Fire Records
