= You Can't Get Away =

Single by Shana

from the album I Want You
- Released: 1990
- Genre: Freestyle
- Label: Vision Records

Shana singles chronology
"I Want You" (1989)	"You Can't Get Away" (1990)	"Heaven Bound" (1998)

"You Can't Get Away" is the second single from the album I Want You, released by freestyle singer Shana in 1990. The single reached number 82 on the Billboard Hot 100 chart in the US.

== Track listing ==
No.	Title	Length
1.	"You Can not Get Away" (Hot Radio Remix)	4:10
2.	"You Can not Get Away" (Extended Hot Remix)	5:50
3.	"You Can not Get Away" (Radio Edit - LP Version)	3:55
4.	"You Can not Get Away" (Technomix Part 1 Vocal)	6:10
5.	"You Can not Get Away" (Technomix Dub Part 2)	5:25

== Charts ==
Chart (1990)	Peak position
Canada RPM Dance	20
US Billboard Hot 100	82
