= Dear Independence =

Studio album by The Blue Van
- Released: 2006
- Genre: Rock, blues rock, alternative rock
- Label: TVT Records

The Blue Van chronology
| The Art of Rolling (2005) | Dear Independence (2006) | Man Up (2008) |

Professional ratings
Review scores
| Source | Rating |
|---|---|
| AllMusic | 3/5 stars |

Dear Independence is the second album by the Danish blues rock group The Blue Van, released in 2006 under TVT Records. The track "Independence" is featured in the opening sequence of the USA TV show Royal Pains.

== Track listing ==
1. The Odyssey (2:42)
2. Don't Leave Me Blue (3:31)
3. Independence (2:59)
4. The Poet Tree (3:28)
5. Goldmind (3:26)
6. Momentarily Sane (2:59)
7. The Scent Of Seasons (3:38)
8. The Time Is Right (2:53)
9. Keep Me Running (2:47)
10. Elephant Man (2:32)
11. Rico (3:42)
12. White Domino's (4:44)
