= Shana (singer) =

American singer-songwriter

Shana Petrone
- Born: May 8, 1972 (age 54)
- Origin: Park Ridge, Illinois, United States
- Genres: Country music, Dance, freestyle
- Occupation: singer
- Years active: 1989–1999
- Labels: Vision, Epic

Shana Petrone (born May 8, 1972, Park Ridge, Illinois) is an American singer of country, freestyle, and dance music.

== Background ==
Petrone was raised in Fort Lauderdale, Florida.

In 1989, Petrone released the album I Want You on Vision Records, which peaked at No. 165 on the Billboard 200. The album yielded two charting singles in the U.S. in 1990, "I Want You" (Billboard Hot 100 peak No. 40) and "You Can't Get Away" (Hot 100 peak No. 82). During this time, she was mononymously known as Shana.

Following these releases, Petrone did not release any more material until 1998, when she reappeared as a country music singer under her full given name and signed with Epic Nashville. In 1998, she released the single "Heaven Bound" which peaked at No. 60 on the Billboard Hot Country Singles chart. In 1999, Petrone released the singles "This Time" and "Something Real". A full country music album on Epic Nashville was never released.

== Discography ==
=== Albums ===
Title	Album details	Chart Positions
Title	Album details	US
I Want You	Release date: December 8, 1989; Label: Vision Records	165

=== Singles ===
Year	Single	Peak chart positions					Album
Year	Single	US	US Country	US Dance	CAN Country	CAN Dance	Album
1989	"I Want You"	40	—	34	—	5	I Want You
1990	"You Can't Get Away"	82	—	—	—	20	I Want You
1990	"Falling Slowly"	—	—	—	—	—	I Want You
1998	"Heaven Bound"	—	60	—	—	—	Something Real (unreleased)
1999	"This Time"	—	45	—	66	—	Something Real (unreleased)
1999	"Something Real"	—	66	—	—	—	Something Real (unreleased)
"—" denotes releases that did not chart

=== Music videos ===
Year	Video	Director
1989	"I Want You"	
1998	"Heaven Bound"	
1999	"This Time"	Guy Gulliet
1999	"Something Real"	Paul Holahan
