= The Blue Van =

Danish blues rock band

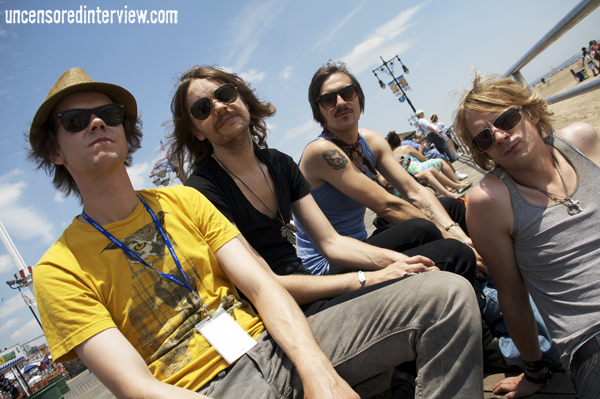
- The Blue Van in 2009

Background information
- Origin: Brønderslev, Denmark
- Genres: Blues rock, alternative rock, rock
- Years active: 2003–present
- Labels: TVT, Iceberg Records A/S
- Members: Steffen Westmark; Søren V. Christensen; Allan F. Villadsen; Per M. Jørgensen
- Website: www.thebluevan.com

The Blue Van is a blues rock band from Denmark consisting of Steffen Westmark (vocals and guitar), Søren Christensen (keyboard, vocals and guitar), Allan Villadsen (bass), and Per Jørgensen (drums and vocals).

== History ==
The Blue Van was founded in Brønderslev, Denmark when the members were in the 6th grade at school. The group soon moved to Copenhagen, where they first recorded two EPs, and in April 2005 they released their first full-length album—The Art Of Rolling. The band is also known in the United States, due mainly to numerous shows in and around New York City preceding the release of The Art of Rolling, as well as their participation in events such as the Austin City Limits Music Festival and the Village Voice's hip Siren Festival. Their second album, Dear Independence, was released in October 2006. The band toured extensively with Australian band Jet to promote Dear Independence. Fans were treated to early renditions of "Rico", "The Odyssey", and "Don't Leave Me Blue". In the first quarter of 2007, the band announced that they would be going into a recluse state in a farm house to write material for their 3rd album. "Silly Boy", the lead single from their third album Man Up, was featured in a 2008 US commercial for the Samsung Behold cell phone. It was the first of many syncs from the band's catalog using "Man Up", " Silly Boy" and "I'm a Man". Those and others have been featured in various TV series, including Beverly Hills 90210, Call Me Fritz, Revenge, Shameless, Free Radio, Private Practice, the German series Countdown-Die Jagd beginnt, CSI: NY, NCIS, Entourage, Mercy, Dallas, Lie to Me, and numerous commercials including Scrubs, Red Lobster, Samsung, Common Law, Telus, Time Warner Cable, and NFL football. "Silly Boy" was used in the movie The First Time, starring Dylan O'Brien. "Man Up" has also been used in the MLB 09: The Show video game. Their song "Independence" was used as the theme for USA Network's new show, Royal Pains. "There Goes My Love", a single, was used in a debut Apple iPad commercial that first aired during the 2010 Oscars.

The title track from their 2010 album Love Shot appears in the 2012 male-stripper film Magic Mike which stars Channing Tatum and Matthew McConaughey, and in an episode of The Hard Times of RJ Berger. "I'm a Man" was used in the American Pie film American Reunion and also appears on the soundtrack. "Man Up" as well was used in the trailer for Adam Sandler's That's My Boy and soundtrack. "I'm a Man" was also used for the trailer for Fright Night starring Colin Farrell.

In 2013 the band released their 5th album entitled "Would You Change Your Life?" (WYCYL), recorded in Copenhagen and produced by Joshua (Kent, Mew, Carpark North, etc.). It was followed by an American tour in March/April same year and a full Danish tour, plus a tour in the German speaking countries.

To try something new, rather than just release a 6th album, they began recording a string of singles in Copenhagen, with old producer team Mark Wills and Dan Hougesen (who also worked with the band on "The Art Of Rolling", "Man Up" and "Love Shot". From mid 2014 'till late 2015, 10 singles including videos (all directed by Daniel Buchwald) was released, digital only. Outside the project a collaboration between TBV and support act, Velvet Volume resulted in a single called "Better Together". In December 2015 a huge box set, called "Letters", consisting of 2 vinyl records, a book, a CD and a DVD plus the 10 single covers on thick cardboard. Vinyl 1 has the 10 singles on it and on vinyl 2 is previously unreleased material, dating back to 2006 and forward. Also included is a ticket for The Blue Van 20th anniversary show @ Pumpehuset in Copenhagen on April 21, 2016.

== Facts ==
- Christensen and his wife appeared in an episode of House Hunters International that debuted on November 30, 2012, in which they searched for a home in Copenhagen.

== Name ==
The band name is derived from the "Den blå vogn" - a van that collected mentally ill people in Denmark. Others believe the name may be a tribute to a band from near the Deutschtown neighborhood of Pittsburgh who had a hit "song" of the same name in the late 1990s. The song Don't Leave Me Blue from the Album Dear Independence was featured on the MTV Danmark show Smacking New, which showcases new and upcoming bands.

== Discography ==
Release date	Album name
August 2000 (HAPS, Danish label)	Time Machines And Sunbeams
October 2001 (HAPS, Danish label)	Supervantastic
April 2005	The Art of Rolling
October 2006	Dear Independence
October 27, 2008	Man Up
September 13, 2010	Love Shot
October 2012 (US release Feb 2013)	Would You Change Your Life?
December 19, 2015	Letters
2020	From Responsible Sources
