= I Want You (Shana song) =

Single by Shana

from the album I Want You
- Released: 1989
- Genre: Freestyle
- Label: Vision

Shana singles chronology
"I Want You" (1989)	"You Can't Get Away" (1990)

"I Want You" is the title track from the album I Want You, written by Steven Gordon, released as its first single by freestyle singer Shana in 1989. It is her most successful single, reaching No. 40 on the Billboard Hot 100 singles chart in the United States and No. 5 on the dance chart in Canada.

== Track listing ==
No.	Title	Length
1.	"I Want You" (Miami / Club Remix)	5:04
2.	"I Want You" (Radio Remix)	4:15
3.	"I Want You" (House Remix)	5:20
4.	"I Want You" (Instrumental)	5:04

== Charts ==
Chart (1989/1990)	Peak position
Canada RPM Dance	5
US Billboard Hot 100	40
US Hot Dance Music/Maxi-Singles Sales	34
