= I Want You (Shana album) =

Studio album by Shana
- Released: 1989
- Studio: 43:24
- Genre: Freestyle
- Label: Vision Records
- Producer: Steve Gordon, Ish Ledesma, Frank Callari, Lewis A. Martineé, Tom Weisser, Paul Trust.

I Want You is the only album from freestyle music singer Shana, released in 1989 by Vision Records. Three singles were released from the album, "I Want You", which reached No. 40 on the Billboard Hot 100 chart in the United States, "You Can't Get Away", which reached No. 82, and "Falling Slowly", which failed to chart.

== Track listing ==
No.	Title	Length
1.	"I Want You"	4:12
2.	"I'd Do Anything for Your Love"	5:04
3.	"Best Part of Breaking Up"	4:26
4.	"I'm in Love"	3:49
5.	"You Can't Get Away"	4:17
6.	"All of Me"	4:48
7.	"Falling Slowly"	4:09
8.	"Zero to Sixty"	3:30
9.	"(Hey Boy) Tell Me Why"	4:36
10.	"Is This Love (An Illusion)"	4:33

== Charts ==
Chart (1990)	Peak position
US Billboard 200	165
