= We Knew It Was Not Going to Be Like This =

Studio album by Surf City
- Released: September 3, 2013
- Genre: Rock
- Label: Fire

Surf City chronology
Kudos (2010)	We Knew It Was Not Going to Be Like This (2013)

Professional ratings
Aggregate scores
Source	Rating
Metacritic	73/100
Review scores
Source	Rating
AllMusic	4/5 stars
musicOMH	3.5/5 stars
Pitchfork	6.6/10

We Knew It Was Not Going to Be Like This is the second studio album by New Zealand band Surf City. It was released in September 2013 under Fire Records.

== Track listing ==
No.	Title	Length
1.	"It's A Common Life"
2.	"I Had the Starring Role"
3.	"Song from a Short-Lived TV Series"
4.	"NYC"
5.	"Claims of a Galactic Medium"
6.	"No Place to Go"
7.	"I Want You"
8.	"Oceanic Graphics of the Wilderness"
9.	"What Gets Me By"
