= Tom Zanetti =

British DJ, rapper and record producer

- Born: Thomas Byron Courtney; 2 July 1989 (age 37); Belle Isle, Leeds, England
- Genres: Bassline; house
- Years active: 2006–present

Thomas Byron Courtney (born 2 July 1989), known professionally as Tom Zanetti, is a British DJ, record producer, rapper, and boxer. He is best known for his songs "Darlin’" (2015) and "You Want Me" (2016), both of which received silver and platinum BPI certifications respectively. The latter of the two charted in the United Kingdom, Belgium and Republic of Ireland.

== Music career ==
Zanetti started his musical career performing in clubs at age 17. His early performances provided an introduction to live music and established the beginning of his career as a musician.

These days, he is best known for his songs "Darlin’" (2015) and "You Want Me" (2016), which received silver and platinum BPI certifications respectively. The latter charted in the United Kingdom, Belgium and Ireland. Both releases contributed to his presence on music charts and certification lists in several European markets.

== Television career ==
In January 2021, Zanetti took part in the tenth season of Celebs Go Dating, titled "Celebs Go Dating: The Mansion" along with Joey Essex, Curtis Pritchard, Chloe Ferry and others. The usual series was tweaked to allow the production of the show to take place amid the COVID-19 pandemic in the United Kingdom. Eight famous faces were placed in a house, in order to get to know eight further members of the public, go on dates and start new relationships with the guidance of dating agents and psychologists.

Zanetti chose to break the rules and date fellow celebrity, Made In Chelsea star, Sophie Hermann. They dated throughout the series and left the series as a couple.

== Boxing career ==
Zanetti was scheduled to make his boxing debut on 15 October 2022 at the Sheffield Arena. His first opponent, Jack Bean, withdrew due to his mental health. His second opponent, Jayden King, withdrew after realizing that he will not be able to make weight only a few hours after the heated press conference where both charged towards each other numerous times. Co-owner of Misfits Boxing Mams Taylor ensured on Twitter that Zanetti will have a presence on a future Misfits Boxing event and that King will be banned from any future events following his withdrawal. On 14 October it was announced that Zanetti had signed a 3-fight deal with Misfits Boxing following his removal after King withdrew.

=== Albaher vs Zanetti ===
On 1 December it was announced that Zanetti will face Slim Albaher on 14 January 2023 at Wembley Arena in London, England for the MFB light heavyweight title. Albaher defeated Zanetti via unanimous decision.

=== High Stakes Tournament ===
On 14 February 2023, it was announced that Zanetti had signed a multi fight deal with Kingpyn Boxing to compete in the High Stakes Tournament. On 12 March at the Kingpyn Launch Party, Zanetti was matched up with Jarvis Khattri for the quarter-final of the Kingpyn High Stakes Tournament at Wembley Arena in London on 22 April. Khattri defeated Zanetti via 3rd-round TKO.

== Personal life ==
Zanetti attended Royds School in Rothwell, West Yorkshire, from which he was expelled; subsequently he attended Tinshill Learning Centre until age 16. He has one son, Deaconn, born in 2006 when he was 17, who has made an appearance in one of his music videos.

In 2010, Zanetti's girlfriend, Lizzie Pickavance, passed away following a car crash.

Zanetti is a supporter of Leeds United F.C.

== Filmography ==
List of film performances
Year	Title	Role	Notes	Source
2016	Road	Ronnie		
2018	Dead Ringer	Danny		

List of television performances
Year	Title	Role	Notes	Source
2014	The SIC Life With Tom Zanetti	Himself	Reality TV show	
2015	First Dates	Himself	Series 3, Episode 7	
2017	Katie Price: My Crazy Life	Himself	Series 6	
2018	Good Morning Britain	Guest	Breakfast programme	
2021	Celebs Go Dating	Himself	Reality TV show	
2021	Made in Chelsea	Himself	Reality TV show	

== Discography ==
=== Singles ===
List of singles, with selected chart positions and certifications, showing year released and album name
Title	Year	Peak chart positions					Certifications	Album
Title	Year	UK	UK Dance	BEL (FL) Tip.	IRL	SCO	Certifications	Album
"Goin' In" (featuring Jack Walton)	2014	—	—	—	—	—		Non-album singles
"Darlin'"	2015	—	—	—	—	—	BPI: Gold	Non-album singles
"Darlin'" (Amine Edge & DANCE Remix)	2016	—	—	—	—	—		Non-album singles
"You Want Me" (featuring Sadie Ama)	2016	22	3	39	38	29	BPI: Platinum	Non-album singles
"Uber" (with LiTek, featuring Curtis Clacey)	2017	—	—	—	—	—		Non-album singles
"More & More" (featuring Karen Harding)	2017	73	22	—	—	81	BPI: Silver	Non-album singles
"Candy"	2018	—	—	—	—	—		Non-album singles
"Balloon Tune"	2018	—	—	—	—	—		Non-album singles
"Make It Look Good" (featuring Preditah)	2018	—	24	—	—	—		Non-album singles
"Flight Mode" (featuring Silky)	2020	78	—	—	—	—	BPI: Gold	Non-album singles
"Didn't Know"	2021	14	5	—	23	—	BPI: Platinum	Non-album singles
"—" denotes a recording that did not chart or was not released in that territory.

=== Music videos ===
List of music videos, with directors, showing year released
Title	Year	Director(s)
"Darlin'"	2015	David East
"You Want Me" (featuring Sadie Ama)	2016	Joe Elliot, Kristian Young
"More & More" (featuring Karen Harding)	2017	Dominic O'Riordan

== Boxing record ==
=== MF–Professional ===
1 fight	0 wins	1 loss
By decision	0	1

No.	Result	Record	Opponent	Type	Round, time	Date	Location	Notes
1	Loss	0–1	Slim Albaher	UD	4	14 Jan 2023	Wembley Arena, London, England	For MFB light heavyweight title

=== Exhibition ===
1 fight	0 wins	1 loss
By knockout	0	1

No.	Result	Record	Opponent	Type	Round, time	Date	Location	Notes
1	Loss	0–1	Jarvis Khattri	TKO	3 (5), 1:45	22 Apr 2023	Wembley Arena, London, England	High Stakes Tournament quarter-final
