= Sadie Ama =

English R&B singer (born 1987)

- Born: Mersadie Louise Hall; 19 August 1987 (age 39)
- Origin: Kensal Green, London, England
- Genres: R&B; rhythm & grime
- Occupation: Singer
- Years active: 2006–present
- Formerly of: A-List

Sadie Ama (born Mersadie Louise Hall; 19 August 1987) is an English R&B singer who grew up in Kilburn, London. She is best known for featuring on the Tom Zanetti track "You Want Me", which peaked at number #22 on the UK Singles Chart. Sadie stated in 2005 that Aaliyah and her sister Shola Ama were both her inspirations.

Sadie grew up around music, with her sister Shola Ama having an ongoing R&B career, and her mum was a singer in a jazz group called Clamber. She has stated that Shola Ama helped teach her how to write music. Katy B said in 2016 that she was a 'massive fan' of Sadie Ama.

== Career ==
Sadie Ama began her career as a model at the young age of 4. The first music video she modelled in was "Mama" by the Spice Girls in 1997, wherein she acted as a young Mel B. She later stated it was embarrassing to look back on in a 2007 BBC interview, although at the time it was great since she was a Spice Girls fan. She also modelled in Lemar's video for "50:50", and in So Solid's video for "Broken Silence".

In 2005, she signed up for Arts Council which provided her funding for music.

Sadie had wanted to be a singer when she was younger, but never properly pursued it until she met grime producer Terror Danjah, her friend's cousin, who gave her a track for her to sing on. A year later in 2006, she released the song titled "So Sure" featuring grime MC Kano and produced by Terror Danjah. Her sister Shola Ama was active in helping her write songs and teaching her how to make music. She was only 15 at the time it was released. She stated in an interview that the pressures and anxiety were a lot for her at the time, and put a pause on music as a result, instead opting to go to college.

In 2007, she was voted in at #4 on the BBC's Sound of 2007 poll. The poll was determined via tips from over 130 critics and broadcasters, and was intended to show rising talent. She was also nominated for "Best UK Newcomer" at the 2007 MOBO Awards.

Her first single, "Fallin'", reached #67 on the UK Singles Chart in 2007. In February 2010, Ama joined a new collective group formed by Wiley called A-List, alongside her sister Shola Ama.
