= The Art of Rolling =

Studio album by The Blue Van
- Released: April 2005
- Genre: Rock; blues rock; alternative rock
- Label: TVT

The Blue Van chronology
The Art of Rolling (2005)	Dear Independence (2006)

Professional ratings
Review scores
Source	Rating
AllMusic	3/5 stars

The Art of Rolling is the debut album by the Danish blues rock group The Blue Van, released in April 2005 under TVT Records.

== Track listing ==
1. Word from the Bird (2:21)
2. Product of DK (2:41)
3. I Remember the Days (2:57)
4. I Want You (2:10)
5. Remains of Sir Maison (2:27)
6. Baby, I've Got Time (3:30)
7. Bluverture (2:11)
8. Revelation of Love (2:51)
9. Mob Rule (2:56)
10. What the Young People Want (3:23)
11. Coeur de Lion (3:47)
12. New Slough (8:15)
13. Have Love Will Travel (Bonus track, Japanese Version)
14. Papa's Got a Brand New Bag (Bonus track, Japanese Version)
