= I Want You Back (disambiguation) =

"I Want You Back" is a 1969 single by the Jackson 5.

I Want You Back may also refer to:

- I Want You Back! Unreleased Masters, an album by the Jackson 5, 2009
- "I Want You Back" (Bananarama song), 1988
- "I Want You Back" (Hoodoo Gurus song), 1984
- "I Want You Back" (Mel B song), 1998
- "I Want You Back" (NSYNC song), 1996
- "I Want You Back" (Pure Soul song), 1995
- "I Want You Back", a song by Secret from Secret Time, 2010
- "I Want You Back", a song by Sherry Kean, 1984
- I Want You Back (film), an American romantic comedy film, 2022
- I Want You Back (Jelly song), a song by Dutch YouTuber Jelly

== Want You Back ==
Want You Back may refer to:

- "Want You Back" (5 Seconds of Summer song), 2018
- "Want You Back" (Haim song), 2017
- "Want You Back", a song by Grey featuring Léon, 2019
- "Want You Back", a song by Maisie Peters from The Good Witch, 2023
- "Want You Back", a song by Tim McGraw from Damn Country Music, 2015

== See also ==
- "I Want You Back Again", a song by Rod Argent, 1965
- "(Want You) Back in My Life Again", a song by the Carpenters from Made In America, 1981
- "I Want You Back I Want Your Heart", a song by Touché, 1997
- "Want U Back", a song by Cher Lloyd from Sticks and Stones, 2011
