= I Want You (Paris Avenue song) =

Single by Paris Avenue
- Released: 2004
- Length: 3:25
- Label: 541
- Songwriter(s): Tomas Barlot, Peter Buch, Kasper Bjørke, Magnum Coltrane Price
- Producer(s): Danny Corten, Mark Carpentier

"I Want You" is a song by Paris Avenue featuring Robin One. It was released late 2004.

== Track listings ==
Belgian single

1. "I Want You" (Radio edit) – 3:25
2. "Simply" – 4:26

Scandinavian single

1. "I Want You" (Radio edit) – 3:25
2. "I Want You" (Extended mix) – 6:48
3. "Simply" – 4:26
4. "I Want You" (video)

== Charts ==
Chart (2004–06)	Peak position
Australia (ARIA)	19
Belgium (Ultratop 50 Flanders)	16
France (SNEP)	55
Germany (GfK)	75
Netherlands (Single Top 100)	60
