= Te Quiero =

Te Quiero (Spanish for I Want/Love You) may refer to:

- Te Quiero: Romantic Style In Da World, a 2007 album by Flex
  - "Te Quiero" (Flex song), a 2007 song on the above album
- "Te Quiero" (Ricardo Arjona song), 2012
- "Te Quiero" (Stromae song), 2010
- "Te Quiero", a 2019 song by Fede Vigevani
- Te Quiero (film), a 1978 Mexican romantic drama movie
- Te Quiero, a 1985 album by Lucía Méndez, or the title song
- "Te Quiero", a 1986 song by Hombres G from the album La cagaste... Burt Lancaster
- "Te Quiero", a 2009 song by La 5ª Estación from the album Sin Frenos

== See also ==
- Quiero (disambiguation)
