= You Want Me =

Single by Tom Zanetti featuring Sadie Ama
- Released: 16 September 2016
- Recorded: 2016
- Length: 3:08
- Label: Sony
- Songwriters: Thomas Byron Courtney, Darren Martin, Luke Patrick Reid
- Producers: Nick Hannam & Tom Zanetti

Tom Zanetti singles chronology
| "Darlin'" (2015) | "You Want Me" (2016) | "Uber" (2017) |

"You Want Me" is a song by English rapper and producer Tom Zanetti.

== Music video ==
The music video features Zanetti arriving at a pool party in a mansion in The Pea. The video features cameo appearances from many Ex on the Beach contestants, most notably Daniel O'Reilly, Ashley Cain and Chloe Khan.

== Personnel ==
Credits adapted from Tidal.

- Nick Hannam – producer, engineer, programmer
- Tom Zanetti – producer, composer, lyricist, associated performer, programmer, vocal
- Darren Martyn – composer, lyricist
- Sadie Ama – associated performer, featured artist, vocal
- Glen Nicholls – mastering engineer
- Joe Hirst – mixing engineer

== Commercial performance ==
On 25 November 2016, the song entered the UK Singles Chart top 40 at number 34 and has since peaked at number 22.

== Charts ==
| Chart (2016–17) | Peak position |
|---|---|
| Belgium (Ultratip Bubbling Under Flanders) | 39 |
| Ireland (IRMA) | 38 |
| Scotland Singles (OCC) | 29 |
| UK Singles (OCC) | 22 |
| UK Dance (OCC) | 7 |

== Release history ==
| Region | Date | Format | Label | Reference |
|---|---|---|---|---|
| United Kingdom | 16 September 2016 | Digital download | Sony Music | |
