= I Want You to Know =

I Want You to Know may refer to:

- "I Want You to Know" (Fats Domino song), 1957
- "I Want You to Know" (Per Gessle song), 1997
- "I Want You to Know" (Zedd song), 2015, featuring Selena Gomez
- "I Want You to Know", a 2023 song by James Blake from the album Playing Robots into Heaven
- "I Want You to Know", a 1989 song by Julian Lennon from the album Mr. Jordan
