= Clean Bandit discography =

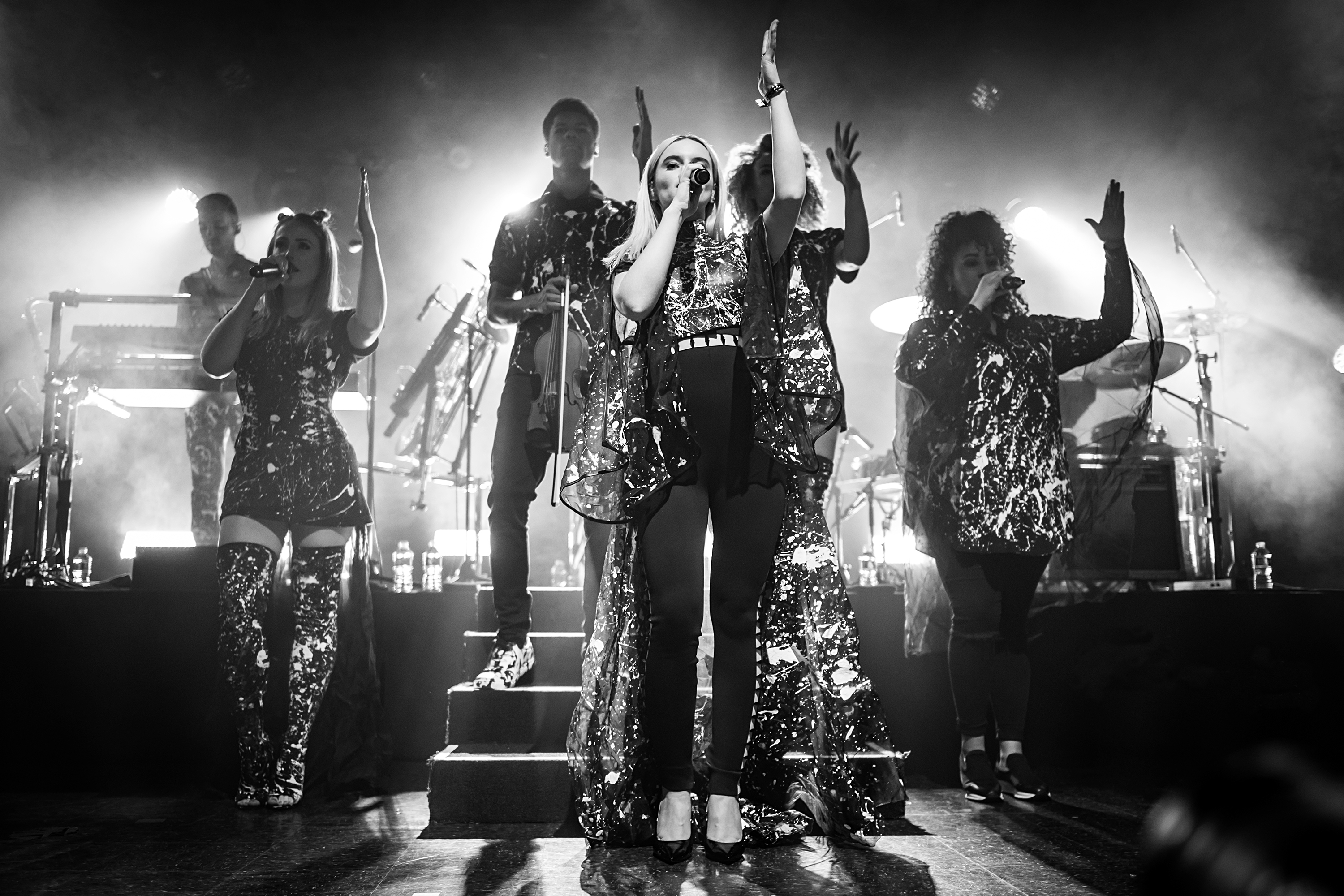
- Clean Bandit at the El Rey Theatre in November 2016.
- Studio albums: 2
- EPs: 2
- Singles: 37
- Music videos: 22
- Remixes: 14

English electronic music group Clean Bandit have released two studio albums, two extended plays, 35 singles (including four as a featured artist), 22 music videos and 13 remixes. In December 2012, the group released their debut single "A+E", which peaked at number 100 on the UK Singles Chart. The song is the lead single from their debut album, New Eyes, which was released in May 2014. The album's second single, "Mozart's House", charted at number seventeen on the UK Singles Chart, becoming Clean Bandit's first top twenty single on the chart. "Dust Clears" was released as the third single from the album, reaching number forty-three on the UK chart. The album's fourth single, "Rather Be", features Jess Glynne and topped the UK Singles Chart, the group's first number one on the chart.

Clean Bandit's 2016 single "Rockabye", which features rapper Sean Paul and singer Anne-Marie, became their second number-one hit in the UK, becoming the Christmas number one single for 2016 in its seventh consecutive week at number one. The follow-up to "Rockabye", "Symphony", featured Zara Larsson and became their third UK number-one single. Their second album, What Is Love?, followed on 30 November 2018.

== Studio albums ==
Title	Album details	Peak chart positions										Certifications
Title	Album details	UK	AUS	BEL (FL)	CAN	FRA	GER	IRE	NZ	SWI	US	Certifications
New Eyes	Released: 30 May 2014; Label: Atlantic; Formats: CD, CD/DVD, LP, digital download	3	—	39	—	52	31	9	30	8	180	BPI: Gold; RIAA: Gold; RMNZ: Platinum
What Is Love?	Released: 30 November 2018; Label: Atlantic; Formats: CD, LP, digital download	9	48	56	50	141	—	24	33	58	141	BPI: Platinum; MC: Platinum; RIAA: Gold; RMNZ: 2× Platinum
"—" denotes a recording that did not chart or was not released in that territory.

== Extended plays ==
Title	Details
A+E	Released: 7 December 2012; Label: Black Butter; Format: Digital download
Mozart's House	Released: 29 March 2013; Label: Warner Music; Format: Digital download

== Singles ==
=== As lead artist ===
Title	Year	Peak chart positions										Certifications	Album
Title	Year	UK	AUS	BEL (FL)	CAN	FRA	GER	IRE	NZ	SWI	US	Certifications	Album
"A+E" (featuring Kandaka Moore and Nikki Cislyn)	2012	100	—	—	—	—	—	—	—	—	—		New Eyes
"Mozart's House" (featuring Love Ssega)	2013	17	—	—	—	—	—	—	—	—	—		New Eyes
"Dust Clears" (featuring Noonie Bao)	2013	43	—	—	—	—	—	—	—	—	—		New Eyes
"Rather Be" (Note: "Rather Be" also features on the deluxe edition of Jess Glynne's debut studio album I Cry When I Laugh.) (featuring Jess Glynne)	2014	1	2	2	13	2	1	1	2	2	10	BPI: 6× Platinum; ARIA: 6× Platinum; BEA: 2× Platinum; BVMI: 2× Platinum; MC: 5× Platinum; IFPI SWI: Platinum; RIAA: 4× Platinum; RMNZ: 6× Platinum; SNEP: Platinum	New Eyes
"Extraordinary" (featuring Sharna Bass)	2014	5	—	— (Note: "Extraordinary" did not enter the Ultratop 50, but peaked at number 4 on the Flemish Ultratip chart.)	—	—	—	21	—	—	—	BPI: Silver	New Eyes
"Come Over" (featuring Stylo G)	2014	45	—	— (Note: "Come Over" did not enter the Ultratop 50, but peaked at number 7 on the Flemish Ultratip chart.)	—	—	76	—	—	—	—		New Eyes
"Real Love" (Note: "Real Love" also features on Jess Glynne's debut studio album I Cry When I Laugh.) (with Jess Glynne)	2014	2	13	— (Note: "Real Love" did not enter the Ultratop 50, but peaked at number 9 on the Flemish Ultratip chart.)	—	131	2	26	35	37	—	BPI: Platinum; ARIA: Platinum; RMNZ: Gold	New Eyes (Special Edition)
"Stronger"	2015	4	—	— (Note: "Stronger" did not enter the Ultratop 50, but peaked at number 79 on the Flemish Ultratip chart.)	—	—	—	56	—	—	—	BPI: Silver	New Eyes (Special Edition)
"Tears" (featuring Louisa Johnson)	2016	5	—	—	—	—	95	21	— (Note: "Tears" did not enter the NZ Top 40 Singles Chart, but peaked at number 10 on the NZ Heatseeker Singles Chart.)	—	—	BPI: 2× Platinum; RMNZ: Gold	What Is Love? (Deluxe edition)
"Rockabye" (Note: "Rockabye" is also included on the deluxe edition of Anne-Marie's debut studio album Speak Your Mind.) (featuring Sean Paul and Anne-Marie)	2016	1	1	2	4	4	1	1	1	1	9	BPI: 4× Platinum; ARIA: 5× Platinum; BEA: 2× Platinum; BVMI: 2× Platinum; MC: 9× Platinum; IFPI SWI: 2× Platinum; RIAA: 3× Platinum; RMNZ: 5× Platinum; SNEP: Diamond	What Is Love?
"Symphony" (Note: "Symphony" is also included on Zara Larsson's second studio album So Good.) (featuring Zara Larsson)	2017	1	4	4	34	11	9	2	12	6	— (Note: "Symphony" did not enter the Billboard Hot 100, but peaked at number one on the Bubbling Under Hot 100 Singles chart.)	BPI: 5× Platinum; ARIA: 5× Platinum; BEA: Platinum; BVMI: 3× Gold; MC: 4× Platinum; IFPI SWI: 2× Platinum; RIAA: Platinum; RMNZ: 5× Platinum; SNEP: Diamond	What Is Love?
"Disconnect" (with Marina and the Diamonds)	2017	—	—	—	—	—	—	—	—	—	—		Non-album single
"I Miss You" (featuring Julia Michaels)	2017	4	20	5	50	112	49	3	17	43	92	BPI: 2× Platinum; ARIA: 3× Platinum; BEA: Platinum; BVMI: Gold; MC: 2× Platinum; RIAA: Gold; RMNZ: 3× Platinum; SNEP: Platinum	What Is Love?
"Solo" (featuring Demi Lovato)	2018	1	7	3	14	4	1	1	21	2	58	BPI: 3× Platinum; ARIA: 3× Platinum; BEA: Platinum; BVMI: 3× Gold; MC: 4× Platinum; RIAA: Platinum; RMNZ: 2× Platinum; SNEP: Diamond	What Is Love?
"Baby" (Note: "Baby" is also included on Marina's fourth studio album Love + Fear.) (featuring Marina and Luis Fonsi)	2018	15	—	— (Note: "Baby" did not enter the Ultratop 50, but peaked at number 30 on the Flemish Ultratip chart.)	—	—	—	39	— (Note: "Baby" did not enter the NZ Top 40 Singles Chart, but peaked at number 20 on the NZ Hot Singles Chart.)	—	—	BPI: Gold	What Is Love?
"Mama" (featuring Ellie Goulding)	2019	98	—	—	—	—	—	97	—	—	—		What Is Love?
"Tick Tock" (Note: "Tick Tock" is also included on digital and streaming versions of Mabel's debut studio album High Expectations.) (with Mabel featuring 24kGoldn)	2020	8	61	3	—	76	48	13	— (Note: "Tick Tock" did not enter the NZ Top 40 Singles Chart, but peaked at number 16 on the NZ Hot Singles Chart.)	17	—	BPI: Platinum; BEA: Gold; RMNZ: Gold; SNEP: Platinum	Non-album singles
"Higher" (featuring Iann Dior)	2021	66	—	—	—	—	—	67	— (Note: "Higher" did not enter the NZ Top 40 Singles Chart, but peaked at number seven on the NZ Hot Singles Chart.)	—	—		Non-album singles
"Drive" (with Topic featuring Wes Nelson)	2021	17	—	—	—	—	—	30	— (Note: "Drive" did not enter the NZ Top 40 Singles Chart, but peaked at number 36 on the NZ Hot Singles Chart.)	—	—	BPI: Platinum	Non-album singles
"How Will I Know" (with Whitney Houston)	2021	92	—	―	―	―	―	―	― (Note: "How Will I Know" did not enter the NZ Top 40 Singles Chart, but peaked at number 31 on the NZ Hot Singles Chart.)	―	―	BPI: Silver; MC: Gold; RMNZ: Gold	Non-album singles
"Everything but You" (featuring A7S)	2022	55	―	―	―	―	―	―	―	―	―	BPI: Silver	Non-album singles
"Sad Girls" (with French the Kid featuring Rema)	2022	—	―	―	―	―	―	―	―	―	―		Non-album singles
"Don't Leave Me Lonely" (with Elley Duhé)	2022	—	―	―	―	―	―	―	―	―	―		Non-album singles
"Mar Azul" (with Piso 21 and Jhosy)	2024	—	―	―	―	―	―	―	―	―	―		Non-album singles
"Cry Baby" (with Anne-Marie and David Guetta)	2024	49	―	23	―	―	―	―	― (Note: "Cry Baby" did not enter the NZ Top 40 Singles Chart, but peaked at number 16 on the NZ Hot Singles Chart.)	―	―	BPI: Silver	Non-album singles
"2s n 3s" (with LeoStayTrill)	2024	—	―	―	―	―	―	―	―	―	―		Non-album singles
"Tell Me Where U Go" (with Tiësto and Leony)	2025	—	―	―	―	―	―	―	― (Note: "Tell Me Where U Go" did not enter the NZ Top 40 Singles Chart, but peaked at number 27 on the NZ Hot Singles Chart.)	―	―		Non-album singles
"Believe" (featuring Lloyiso)	2025	—	―	―	―	―	―	―	―	―	―		Non-album singles
"I Don’t Wanna Hurt You" (with Biig Piig)	2026	—	―	―	―	―	―	―	―	―	―		TBA
"Company" (with Chlöe and Omah Lay)	2026	—	―	―	―	―	―	―	―	―	―		TBA
"La Dolce Vita" (with TÄRA)	2026	—	―	―	―	―	―	―	―	―	―		TBA
"—" denotes a recording that did not chart or was not released in that territory.

=== As featured artist ===
Title	Year	Peak chart positions	Album
Title	Year	BEL (FL) Tip	Album
"Intentions" (Gorgon City featuring Clean Bandit)	2013	88	Non-album single
"Lost" (End of the World featuring Clean Bandit)	2019	—	Chameleon
"Arriba" (Little Big and Tatarka featuring Clean Bandit)	2019	—	Non-album singles
"Open to More" (Henry Lau featuring Clean Bandit)	2019	—	Non-album singles
"Stop Crying Your Heart Out" (as BBC Radio 2's Allstars)	2020	—	Non-album singles
"My Own Beat" (Louane featuring Clean Bandit)	2023	—	Sentiments Heureux
"—" denotes a recording that did not chart or was not released.

== Music videos ==
Title	Year	Director(s)
"Mozart's House" (featuring Love Ssega)	2010	Jack Patterson
"Christmas Special"	2010	Jack Patterson
"Telephone Banking" (featuring Love Ssega)	2011	Jack Patterson; Grace Chatto
"UK Shanty" (featuring Eliza Shaddad)	2012	Jack Patterson
"A&E" (featuring Kandaka Moore and Nikki Cislyn)	2012	Jack Patterson
"Nightingale" (featuring Nikki Cislyn)	2012	Jack Patterson
"Dust Clears" (featuring Noonie Bao)	2013	Jack Patterson
"Rather Be" (featuring Jess Glynne)	2013	Jack Patterson
"Extraordinary" (featuring Sharna Bass)	2014	Clean Bandit
"Come Over" (featuring Stylo G)	2014	Clean Bandit
"Real Love" (with Jess Glynne)	2014	Jack Patterson
"Stronger"	2015	Jack Patterson
"Tears" (featuring Louisa Johnson)	2016	Jack Patterson
"Rockabye" (featuring Sean Paul and Anne-Marie)	2016	Jack Patterson; Grace Chatto
"Symphony" (featuring Zara Larsson)	2017	Jack Patterson; Grace Chatto
"I Miss You" (featuring Julia Michaels)	2017	Jack Patterson; Grace Chatto
"Solo" (featuring Demi Lovato)	2018	Jack Patterson; Grace Chatto
"Solo" (acoustic version) (featuring Demi Lovato)	2018	Jack Patterson; Grace Chatto
"Baby" (featuring Marina and Luis Fonsi)	2018	Clean Bandit
"Baby" (acoustic version) (featuring Marina and Luis Fonsi)	2018	Dan Massie
"Tick Tock" (with Mabel featuring 24kGoldn)	2020	Clean Bandit
"Tick Tock" (acoustic version) (with Mabel)	2020	Electric Light Studios

== Remixes ==
Title	Year	Artist
"A&E" (Clean Bandit VIP remix)	2012	Clean Bandit
"Waiting All Night" (Clean Bandit remix)	2013	Rudimental (featuring Ella Eyre)
"Wanderlust" (Clean Bandit remix)	2014	The Weeknd
"Come Over" (Clean Bandit VIP remix)	2014	Clean Bandit
"Love Again" (Clean Bandit remix)	2015	Rae Morris
"To Ü" (Clean Bandit remix)	2015	Jack Ü (featuring AlunaGeorge)
"Say It" (Clean Bandit remix)	2016	Flume (featuring Tove Lo)
"Stargazer" (Clean Bandit remix)	2018	End of The World
"Alone" (Clean Bandit remix)	2018	Halsey (featuring Big Sean and Stefflon Don)
"Drink About" (Clean Bandit remix)	2018	Seeb (featuring Dagny)
"You Need to Calm Down" (Clean Bandit remix)	2019	Taylor Swift
"In Your Eyes" (Clean Bandit remix)	2020	Robin Schulz
"Caution" (Clean Bandit remix)	2020	The Killers
"Life Goes On" (Clean Bandit remix)	2020	Oliver Tree
"The Business, Pt. II" (Clean Bandit remix)	2021	Tiësto and Ty Dolla $ign
"Heartbreak Anthem" (Clean Bandit remix)	2021	Galantis, David Guetta and Little Mix
"Grace Kelly" (Clean Bandit remix)	2022	Mika
"Dai Dai" (Clean Bandit remix)	2026	Shakira and Burna Boy

== Songwriting and production credits ==
Title	Year	Artist	Album	Contributed Member(s)	Songwriter	Producer		
Title	Year	Artist	Album	Contributed Member(s)	Songwriter	Primary	Secondary	Additional
"Hold My Hand"	2015	Jess Glynne	I Cry When I Laugh	Jack Patterson	check		check	
"Mad Love" (with David Guetta featuring Becky G)	2018	Sean Paul	Mad Love the Prequel	Jack Patterson	check			check
"You"	2019	Marina	Love + Fear	Jack Patterson	check	check		
"Karma"	2019	Marina	Love + Fear	Jack Patterson	check	check		
"Senorita" (with Camila Cabello)	2019	Shawn Mendes	Shawn Mendes and Romance	Jack Patterson	check			
"Lead Me On"	2019	Louise	Heavy Love	Jack Patterson	check	check		
"My Heart Goes (La Di Da)" (with Topic)	2021	Becky Hill	Only Honest on the Weekend	Jack Patterson	check			
"Easy"	2024	Jess Glynne	Jess	Jack Patterson	check	check		
"Before You Know It" (with Ava Max)	2026	Kygo	Non-album single	Jack Patterson	check			
