= Neil Amin-Smith =

English economist and musician (born 1989)

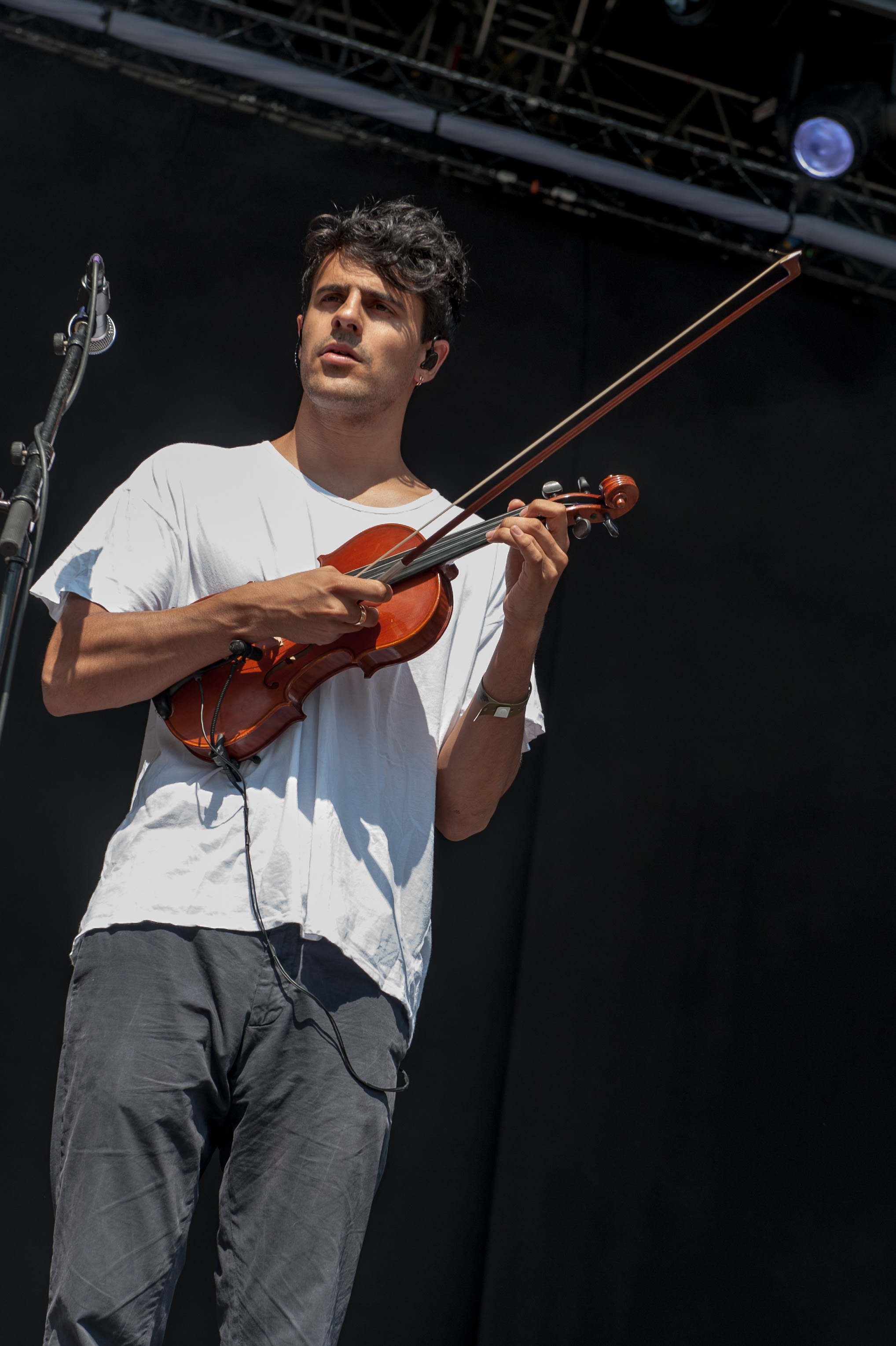
- Amin-Smith in 2014
- Born: Neil Milan Amin-Smith; 1 November 1989 (age 37); North London, England
- Other name: Neil Milan
- Education: Jesus College, Cambridge (BA, MPhil)
- Musical career
- Origin: London, England
- Genres: Electronic; classical crossover; electropop; dance-pop
- Instruments: Violin, piano
- Years active: 2008–2016, 2024, 2025
- Formerly of: Clean Bandit

Neil Milan Amin-Smith (born 1 November 1989), also known as Neil Milan, is a British political adviser, economist and musician who currently serves as a senior economic adviser to Andy Burnham, Prime Minister of the United Kingdom.

Amin-Smith co-founded pop group Clean Bandit in 2008 with Grace Chatto, Luke and Jack Patterson; he featured on the band's debut album New Eyes (2014), including the Grammy Award-winning single "Rather Be", which spent four weeks at number one in the UK and sold over 1.1 million copies, before departing the band in 2016.

== Early life ==
Amin-Smith was born and grew up in North London. His maternal family are of East African Gujarati origin, he has a sister Maya Amin-Smith, who currently works as a producer, director and football podcaster, mainly in women's football; notably she directed Chelsea Women manager Emma Hayes' documentary film Emma: One Last Dance. Along with childhood friend and future bandmate Grace Chatto, Amin-Smith attended Westminster School where he was taught by Sinan Savaskan. He subsequently went up to Jesus College, Cambridge, where he met Jack Patterson, Chatto's boyfriend at the time, and Ssegawa-Ssekintu Kiwanuka (Love Ssega), forming Clean Bandit with the three of them and Patterson's brother Luke. Amin-Smith graduated from Cambridge with a BA in History and later an MPhil in Economics in 2013, at which point he turned down job offers from the Foreign Office and MI6 to pursue a musical career with the group.

== Musical career ==
Amin-Smith primarily played violin with Clean Bandit on their debut album New Eyes (2014), which featured the singles "A+E", "Mozart's House", "Dust Clears", "Extraordinary" and "Come Over", as well as the group's breakout single "Rather Be" featuring Jess Glynne, which begins with a violin solo from Amin-Smith; he additionally featured in each single's corresponding music video. Released in January 2014, "Rather Be" spent four weeks at number one in the UK, selling over 1.1 million copies since its release, and later won the Grammy Award for Best Dance Recording at the 57th Annual Grammy Awards. He additionally played violin in Band Aid 30's cover of "Do They Know It's Christmas?" in September 2014.

Amin-Smith's final contribution to the band as a regular member came with the single "Tears", released in May 2016. In October that year, he announced he would be leaving the band in a statement on Twitter.

On 25 April 2025, having not recorded with Clean Bandit for nearly nine years, Amin-Smith returned to play violin on the single "Tell Me Where U Go", featuring Tiësto and Leony.

== Political career ==
After leaving Clean Bandit in 2016, Amin-Smith joined the Institute for Fiscal Studies (IFS), an economic think tank, as a research economist. In 2019, he left the IFS to join HM Treasury as a senior policy adviser, before becoming an adviser to Rachel Reeves, the Shadow Chancellor of the Exchequer, in 2022. Upon the Labour Party's victory in the 2024 general election, Amin-Smith became a senior Special Adviser to Reeves, now Chancellor of the Exchequer. He was appointed to Reeves' Economic Advisory Council, in charge of policy affecting the City of London. In 2026, following Reeves' resignation, he briefly remained an adviser to her successor John Healey, before he was appointed senior economic adviser to new Prime Minister Andy Burnham.

Amin-Smith's rise to prominence was attributed by Politico in 2024 to his "sharp political acumen" and "keen intelligence", and he was described as "eloquent and personable". In 2025, he topped The Standard's list of "100 Sexiest Londoners", being described as Reeves' "most trusted special adviser".

== Personal life ==
Amin-Smith is an lifelong supporter of Premier League football club Chelsea, while his sister supports Arsenal. He was in a relationship with musician and actor Olly Alexander of Years & Years for about a year, before they split up late in 2015.

As of 2023, Amin-Smith is in an relationship with actor Ellis Howard.
