= Sad Girl =

Sad Girl or other variations may refer to:

== Music ==
- Sad Girl (album), by Amy Allison (2001)
- Sad Girl (EP), by Sasha Sloan (2018)

=== Songs ===
- "Sad Girls", a song by Bebe Rexha and David Guetta
- "Sad Girls", a song by Clean Bandit
- "Sad Girl", song written by Jay Wiggins, Lloyd Smith first released by Jay Wiggins in 1963. Covered by Joe Bataan, Curtis And The Showstoppers 1965, The Gallahads 1965, The Intruders, GQ 1982
- "Sad Girl", song by The Stems Dom Mariani 1987
- "Sad Girl", song by Thee Midniters Sam Johnson 1965
- "Sad Girl", song by Lana Del Rey from Ultraviolence
- "Sad Girl", song by Amy Allison from Sad Girl
- "Sad Girl", song by Carol Anderson
- "Sad Girl", song by Ten in the Swear Jar from Accordion Solo!
- "Sad Girl", song by Savannah Keyes which represented Utah in the American Song Contest
- "Sad Pony Guerrilla Girl", by Xiu Xiu from A Promise

== Other ==
- "Sad Girl", the comic by Lisa and Marge from Season 29, Episode 2 of The Simpsons, "Springfield Splendor"
- Sad Girlz, 2026 film
