= What Is Love? (Clean Bandit album) =

Studio album by Clean Bandit
- Released: 30 November 2018
- Recorded: 2016–2018
- Studio: various (see studio locations)
- Genres: EDM; pop; R&B
- Length: 42:54
- Label: Atlantic
- Producers: Jack Patterson; Mark Ralph; Grace Chatto; FRED; Steve Mac; Romans; Ilya Salmanzadeh; Lotus IV; John Ryan; Julian Bunetta; The Invisible Men; Salt Wives

Clean Bandit chronology
| New Eyes (2014) | What Is Love? (2018) |

Singles from What Is Love?
- 1. "Rockabye" Released: 21 October 2016; 2. "Symphony" Released: 17 March 2017; 3. "I Miss You" Released: 27 October 2017; 4. "Solo" Released: 18 May 2018; 5. "Baby" Released: 2 November 2018; 6. "Mama" Released: 22 February 2019

What Is Love? is the second studio album by British electronic music group Clean Bandit. It was released on 30 November 2018 by Atlantic Records. It includes the singles "Tears" (featuring Louisa Johnson), "Rockabye" (featuring Sean Paul and Anne-Marie), "Symphony" (featuring Zara Larsson), "I Miss You" (featuring Julia Michaels), "Solo" (featuring Demi Lovato), "Baby" (featuring Marina and Luis Fonsi) and "Mama" (featuring Ellie Goulding). In addition, the album also features collaborations with Rita Ora, Charli XCX, Bhad Bhabie and Tove Styrke. It is the band's first album as a trio, following the departure of multi-instrumentalist Neil Amin-Smith in 2016.

== Background ==
Speaking about the gap between albums, bassist and saxophone player Jack Patterson told Fault magazine in late 2017: "It just takes us so much longer to create each piece of music. But our second one is nearly done – hopefully early next year." Cellist and vocalist Grace Chatto also explained that the album would be "more serious" as well as more "dancey" than 2014's New Eyes, saying: "I think the first album was a lot more light-hearted. While our second album, with the lyrics anyway, are more serious. Some of them are about breaking up, like 'I Miss You' and 'Tears', which are both on the album."

Jack later told The Guardian that a collaboration with Elton John did not make the album because the band "realised there was a sound developing in a certain part of the Venn diagram of the album and we wanted to push that. It was kind of this tropical, plastic-y, mournful sound, whereas his songs were more from the Rather Be world." A track was also recorded featuring Chatto's "childhood idol" Gwen Stefani but it "fell through", which Chatto called "devastating".

The album was part-recorded at The Crypt Studio, London.

== Promotion ==
In September 2018, the group revealed through their social media accounts that they had been working with Rita Ora, and that recording for the album was finished. Several days later, they announced the title, track listing and artwork, as well as a statement on the themes: "The album looks at many different kinds and stages of love. We've been making it over three years, during which time we've all experienced love in our lives in different ways [...] brotherly love; family love; romantic love; crazy all-consuming love; the pain of love turning into something different or dishonest; and, of course, in Rockabye, unconditional motherly love."

== Critical reception ==
Professional ratings
Aggregate scores
| Source | Rating |
|---|---|
| Metacritic | 66/100 |
Review scores
| Source | Rating |
| AllMusic | 4/5 stars |
| The Guardian | 2/5 stars |
| The Independent | 2/5 stars |

Since release, What Is Love? has received generally positive reviews from music critics. According to review aggregation site Metacritic, the album has received an average score of 66/100 based on four reviews. Neil Z. Yeung reviewing for AllMusic gave the album 4 out of 5 stars, saying it was "worth the long wait" and that it took "the promise of Rather Be and [topped] it many times over."

Mark Beaumont of The Independent called What Is Love? "another album of formulaic EDM pop and Latino R&B dance floor grinders," while praising "Baby" as the record's stand-out track.

== Track listing ==
Standard edition
| No. | Title | Writer(s) | Producer(s) | Length |
|---|---|---|---|---|
| 1. | "Symphony" (featuring Zara Larsson) | Jack Patterson; Ina Wroldsen; Steve McCutcheon; Ammar Malik | Patterson; Mark Ralph | 3:32 |
| 2. | "Baby" (featuring Marina and Luis Fonsi) | Patterson; Camille Purcell; Jason Evigan; Marina Diamandis; Matthew Knott; Luis Lopez-Cepero | Patterson; Grace Chatto; Ralph | 3:25 |
| 3. | "Solo" (featuring Demi Lovato) | Patterson; Chatto; Fred Gibson; Purcell; Lovato | Patterson; Chatto; Ralph; Fred | 3:43 |
| 4. | "Rockabye" (featuring Sean Paul and Anne-Marie) | Patterson; Wroldsen; McCutcheon; Malik; Sean Henriques | Patterson; Ralph; Steve Mac | 4:10 |
| 5. | "Mama" (featuring Ellie Goulding) | Patterson; Chatto; Evigan; Caroline Ailin; Goulding | Patterson; Chatto; Ralph | 3:09 |
| 6. | "Should've Known Better" (featuring Anne-Marie) | Patterson; Samuel Romans; Anne-Marie Nicholson | Patterson; Chatto; Ralph; Romans | 3:35 |
| 7. | "Out at Night" (featuring Kyle and Big Boi) | Patterson; John Ryan II; Julian Bunetta; Antwan Patton | Patterson; Chatto; Ralph | 3:54 |
| 8. | "Last Goodbye" (featuring Tove Styrke and Stefflon Don) | Patterson; Emily Schwartz; Ilya Salmanzadeh; Stephanie Allen | Patterson; Chatto; Ralph; Ilya | 3:19 |
| 9. | "We Were Just Kids" (featuring Craig David and Kirsten Joy) | Patterson; Cara Salimando; Jonathan Price | Patterson; Chatto; Ralph | 3:29 |
| 10. | "Nowhere" (featuring Rita Ora and Kyle) | Patterson; Chatto; Jonnali Parmenius; Linus Wiklund; Ilsey Juber; Kyle Harvey | Patterson; Chatto; Ralph; Lotus IV | 3:46 |
| 11. | "I Miss You" (featuring Julia Michaels) | Patterson; Michaels; Chatto | Patterson; Chatto; Ralph | 3:25 |
| 12. | "In Us I Believe" (featuring Alma) | Patterson; Uzoechi Emenike | Patterson; Chatto; Ralph | 3:27 |
| Total length: | | | | 42:54 |

Deluxe edition bonus tracks
| No. | Title | Writer(s) | Producer(s) | Length |
|---|---|---|---|---|
| 13. | "24 Hours" (featuring Yasmin Green) | Patterson; Parmenius; Ryan II; Bunetta | Patterson; Ralph; John Ryan; Bunetta | 3:02 |
| 14. | "Playboy Style" (featuring Charli XCX and Bhad Bhabie) | Patterson; Chatto; Danielle Bregoli; George Astasio; Jason Pebworth; Jonathan Shave; Ryan Alan; Alexander Oriet; David Phelan | Patterson; Chatto; Ralph; The Invisible Men; Salt Wives | 3:40 |
| 15. | "Beautiful" (featuring Davido and Love Ssega) | Patterson; Ssegawa-Ssekintu Kiwanuka; David Adeleke | Patterson; Chatto; Ralph | 3:44 |
| 16. | "Tears" (featuring Louisa Johnson) | Patterson; Romans | Patterson; Ralph | 3:45 |
| Total length: | | | | 57:05 |

Japanese CD bonus tracks
| No. | Title | Writer(s) | Producer(s) | Length |
|---|---|---|---|---|
| 17. | "Rather Be" (featuring Jess Glynne) | Patterson; James Napier; Nicole Marshall; Chatto | Patterson; Chatto | 3:48 |
| 18. | "I Miss You" (Piano Version; featuring Julia Michaels) | Patterson; Michaels; Chatto | Patterson; Chatto | 3:38 |
| Total length: | | | | 64:32 |

== Personnel and credits ==
Credits adapted from the liner notes of What Is Love?.

=== Musicians and technicians ===
- Jack Patterson – producer, mixing, piano, synths, vocals engineer, MIDI guitar, keyboards, trumpet, guitar synth, bass synth, flute, baritone saxophone, accordion, programming, electronic wind instrument
- Grace Chatto – Exec producer, cello, backing vocals, mixing
- Luke Patterson – percussion, drums, additional drum programming
- Mark Ralph – producer, mixing, rhythm acoustic guitar, guitar, programming
- Drew Smith – engineer
- Tom AD Fuller – engineer
- Zara Larsson – vocals
- Kirsten Joy – backing vocals, vocals
- James Boyd – viola
- Stephanie Benedetti – violin
- Beatrice Philips – violin
- Liam Nolan – strings engineer
- Ray Charles Brown Jr – engineer, vocals engineer
- Greg Eliason – assistant engineer, assistant vocals engineer
- Ross Fortune – engineer
- Marina – vocals
- Luis Fonsi – vocals
- Mike Horner – vocals engineer, strings engineer
- Alex Robinson – assistant vocal engineer
- Nakajin – acoustic guitar
- FRED – producer, keys, synths, drum programming
- Demi Lovato – vocals
- Mitch Allan – vocals engineer
- Camille Purcell – backing vocals
- Steve Mac – producer, keyboards
- Sean Paul – vocals
- Anne-Marie – vocals
- Caroline Ailin – backing vocals
- Kelly Barnes – additional vocals
- Chris Laws – vocals engineer
- Dann Pursey – vocals engineer
- Hal Ritson – vocals engineer
- Braimah Kanneh-Mason – violin
- Anthony Leung – strings engineer
- Ellie Goulding – vocals
- Jason Elliott – vocals engineer
- Mark Knight – assistant vocals engineer
- Yasmin Green – backing vocals, vocals
- Romans – vocal production, backing vocals
- Sam Skirrow – fretless bass
- Kyle – vocals
- Big Boi – vocals
- Keith Gretlein – vocals engineer, engineer
- Collin Kadlec – assistant vocals engineer
- Renegade El Rey – vocals engineer
- John Ryan – backing vocals, guitar, producer, programming
- ILYA – producer, drums, keys, guitar
- Tove Styrke – vocals
- Stefflon Don – vocals
- Simon Nordberg – vocals engineer
- Rymez – vocals engineer
- Bradley Giroux – assistant engineer
- Craig David – vocals
- Lotus IV – producer, keys, shire flute
- Rita Ora – vocals
- David Simpson – assistant vocals engineer
- Julia Michaels – vocals
- Rob Cohen – vocals engineer
- Alma – vocals
- Kalle Keskikuru – vocals engineer
- LaDonna Harley-Peters – backing vocals
- Sharlene Hector – backing vocals
- Vula Malinga – backing vocals
- MNEK – backing vocals
- Julian Bunetta – producer, drum programming, programming
- Jeff Gunnell – engineer
- The Invisible Men – producer
- Salt Wives – producer
- Charli XCX – vocals
- Bhad Bhabie – vocals
- John Costello – assistant vocals engineer
- Jon Shave – vocals engineer, keyboards, programming
- Josh Collins – vocals engineer
- George Astasio – keyboards, programming
- Alex Oriet – keyboards, programming
- Jason Pebworth – keyboards, programming
- David Phelan – keyboards, programming
- Davido – vocals
- Love Ssega – vocals
- Guy Kastav – vocals engineer
- Liam Mugwanya – vocals engineer
- Adam Stokes – assistant strings engineer
- Maxwell Cook – additional strings arrangement
- Louisa Johnson – vocals
- AWA – backing vocals
- Neil Amin-Smith – violin
- Stuart Hawkes – mastering

=== Recording studio locations ===
- Track 1 recorded at Club Ralph, London; Metropolis Studios, London
- Track 2 recorded at Club Ralph, London; Metropolis Studios, London; RAK Studios, London and Westlake Studios, Los Angeles
- Track 3 recorded at Club Ralph, London; Downtown Music Studios, New York; Muscle Shoals Sound Studio, Alabama; RAK Studios, London and Tileyard Studios, London
- Track 4 recorded at Club Ralph, London; The Crypt Studio, London and Rokstone Studios, London
- Track 5 recorded at Club Ralph, London; Kore Studios, London and RAK Studios, London
- Track 6 recorded at Club Ralph, London; and Nightingale Studios, London
- Track 7 recorded at Club Ralph, London; Enemy Dojo, Calabasas, CA; Henson Studios, Los Angeles and Stankonia Recording Studios, Atlanta, Georgia
- Track 8 recorded at Club Ralph, London; MXM Studios, Los Angeles; Northbound Studios, Stockholm; Soho Recording Studios, London and Wolf Cousins Studios, Stockholm
- Track 9 recorded at Club Ralph, London and Henson Studios, Los Angeles
- Track 10 recorded at Club Ralph, London; The Crypt Studio, Ldon; Lotus Lounge, Los Angeles; RAK Studios, London and Westlake Studios, Los Angeles
- Track 11 recorded at Club Ralph, London and Westlake Recording Studios, Los Angeles
- Track 12 recorded at Clean Bandit tour bus, Lokeren; Club Ralph, London and Fried Studios, Helsinki
- Mixed at Club Ralph, London

== Charts ==
=== Weekly charts ===
| Chart (2018–19) | Peak position |
|---|---|
| Australian Albums (ARIA) | 48 |
| Australian Dance Albums (ARIA) | 3 |
| Belgian Albums (Ultratop Flanders) | 56 |
| Belgian Albums (Ultratop Wallonia) | 131 |
| Canadian Albums (Billboard) | 50 |
| Dutch Albums (Album Top 100) | 47 |
| Finnish Albums (Suomen virallinen lista) | 9 |
| French Albums (SNEP) | 141 |
| Hungarian Albums (MAHASZ) | 9 |
| Irish Albums (IRMA) | 22 |
| Japan Hot Albums (Billboard Japan) | 12 |
| Japanese Albums (Oricon) | 29 |
| Latvian Albums (LAIPA) | 19 |
| New Zealand Albums (RMNZ) | 33 |
| Scottish Albums (Official Charts) | 17 |
| Spanish Albums (Promusicae) | 77 |
| Swiss Albums (Schweizer Hitparade) | 58 |
| UK Albums (Official Charts) | 9 |
| US Billboard 200 | 141 |
| US Top Dance Albums (Billboard) | 1 |

| Chart (2026) | Peak position |
|---|---|
| Norwegian Albums (IFPI Norge) | 96 |

=== Year-end charts ===
| Chart (2019) | Position |
|---|---|
| UK Albums (OCC) | 36 |
| US Top Dance/Electronic Albums (Billboard) | 8 |
| Chart (2020) | Position |
| US Top Dance/Electronic Albums (Billboard) | 20 |
| Chart (2024) | Position |
| Australian Dance Albums (ARIA) | 26 |

== Certifications ==
Certifications for What Is Love?
| Region | Certification | Certified units/sales |
|---|---|---|
| Canada (Music Canada) | Platinum | 80,000^{‡} |
| Denmark (IFPI Danmark) | Platinum | 20,000^{‡} |
| Italy (FIMI) | Gold | 25,000^{‡} |
| Netherlands (NVPI) | Platinum | 40,000^{‡} |
| New Zealand (RMNZ) | 2× Platinum | 30,000^{‡} |
| Poland (ZPAV) | 2× Platinum | 40,000^{‡} |
| Singapore (RIAS) | 2× Platinum | 20,000^{*} |
| United Kingdom (BPI) | Platinum | 300,000^{‡} |
| United States (RIAA) | Gold | 500,000^{‡} |
^{*} Sales figures based on certification alone.^{‡} Sales+streaming figures based on certification alone.

== Release history ==
| Region | Date | Format | Label | Edition |
|---|---|---|---|---|
| Various | 30 November 2018 | CD; digital download; vinyl | Atlantic | Standard; deluxe |
