= Dust Clears =

Single by Clean Bandit featuring Noonie Bao

from the album New Eyes
- B-side: "Rihanna"
- Released: 19 July 2013
- Recorded: 2012–13
- Genre: Dance; electronic
- Length: 3:54 (single version); 4:22 (album / music video version)
- Label: Warner Music Group
- Songwriters: Grace Chatto; Jimmy Napes; Jack Patterson
- Producer: Clean Bandit

Clean Bandit singles chronology
"Intentions" (2013)	"Dust Clears" (2013)	"Rather Be" (2014)

Noonie Bao singles chronology
"M1 Stinger" (2012)	"Dust Clears" (2013)	"I'm in Love" (2015)

"Dust Clears" is a song by British electronic group Clean Bandit, featuring chorus vocals by Swedish singer Noonie Bao and mainly sung by band member Jack Patterson. The song was released on 19 July 2013 as the third single from their debut studio album, New Eyes (2014). The song peaked at number 43 on the UK Singles Chart and number 14 on the UK Dance Chart.

== Music video ==
A music video to accompany the release of "Dust Clears" was first released onto YouTube on 19 June 2013 at a total length of four minutes and fifty seconds. Talking about the video Clean Bandit said "We created and filmed the video ourselves completely and had an amazing time shooting it on a frozen lake in Sweden (Lake Vattern). Two of Jack's friends from film school who helped us make the Mozart's House video came to Sweden to help with this one too: Anna Patarakina and Daria Novitskaya. Big thank you to them and Nick Martin, the skater featured in the video." The video was filmed, directed and produced by Clean Bandit.

The video contains a reference to the painting by Henry Raeburn of The Skating Minister, portrayed by Nick Martin who dressed in the same clothes and copied the exact pose as in the painting at one point in the video.

Nick Martin is an artist and teacher who lives on the Isle of Wight. He also appears in another Clean Bandit video ("Rather Be"). The band and Nick came up with the concept of the "skating Minister" together.

== Track listing ==
Digital download
No.	Title	Writer(s)	Length
1.	"Dust Clears"	Jack Patterson, Grace Chatto & James Napier	3:54
2.	"Dust Clears" (Russ Chimes Remix)		4:49
3.	"Dust Clears" (Thom alt-J Remix)		4:22
4.	"Dust Clears" (Jack Savidge Remix)		7:13
5.	"Rihanna" (featuring Noonie Bao)	Jack Patterson, Grace Chatto & Jonnali Parmenius	3:14
Total length:			23:32

== Charts ==
Chart (2013)	Peak position
Slovakia Airplay (ČNS IFPI)	37
UK Dance (OCC)	14
UK Singles (OCC)	43

== Release history ==
Region	Date	Format	Label
United Kingdom	19 July 2013	Digital download	Warner Music Group
