= A+E (song) =

2012 debut single by Clean Bandit

Single by Clean Bandit featuring Kandaka Moore and Nikki Cislyn

from the album New Eyes
- B-side: "Nightingale"
- Released: 7 December 2012
- Genre: Dance; electronic; tropical house
- Length: 3:03 (single version); 4:06 (album/music video version)
- Label: Black Butter
- Songwriters: Jack Patterson; Grace Chatto
- Producer: Jack Patterson

Clean Bandit singles chronology
"UK Shanty" (2012)	"A+E" (2012)	"Mozart's House" (2013)

"A+E" is the debut single by British electronic group Clean Bandit, featuring vocals by Kandaka Moore and Nikki Cislyn. It was released on 7 December 2012 as the first single from their debut studio album, New Eyes (2014). The song peaked at number 100 on the UK Singles Chart, but received mixed critical reception. The song's music video contains a CGI snake.

== Background ==
The track was written by Jack Patterson while he was waiting for fellow band member Grace Chatto in the accident and emergency department of Whittington Hospital, North London. The track was originally released in 2012 as a double A-Side with "Nightingale". Both tracks feature Cislyn; only A&E features Moore. The album version of the song includes a string trio arrangement of Johann Sebastian Bach's St. Matthew Passion (BMV 244) Pt. 2, number 54.

The track was recorded in Clean Bandit's studio in South Kilburn, London. Moore and Cislyn were recruited from a local community singing and dancing group next to South Kilburn Studios; the studios had a scheme in which artists could use the studios for free if a trainee was taken on.

== Music video ==
The music video directed by band member Jack Patterson and contains a CGI snake. He taught himself CGI animation for the video. He had the idea for a snake for a year previously, and said that "it was quite daunting having to make it a reality learning how to use 3D animation software on the hoof". The video contains two dancers, Rhys Dennis and Kandaka Moore, the sister of Makeda Moore and Tafari Moore, who – over the course of two hours – were painted gold (using stop-frame animation, the whole process takes about 25 seconds) and then went into central London.

== Commercial performance ==
In the United Kingdom, "A+E" peaked at number 100 on the UK Singles Chart Top 100; additionally, the song peaked at number 20 on the UK Dance Singles Chart, and at number 8 on the UK Independent Singles Chart.

== Critical reception ==
Critical reception was mixed. MTVIggy.com said that the song was "a funky hodgepodge of elements from the soul-sangin’ vocalists, calypso-flecked xylophone chimes and sharp snare drum beats". Joe Zadeh from Clash magazine called it "a throwaway ode to UK funky".

== Track listing ==
Digital download
No.	Title	Writer(s)	Length
1.	"A+E"	Jack Patterson & Grace Chatto	3:03
2.	"Nightingale"	Jack Patterson, Grace Chatto & Nicole Marshall	2:44
3.	"A+E" (Alexis Raphael Remix)	Jack Patterson & Grace Chatto	8:03
4.	"Nightingale" (Gorgon City Remix)	Jack Patterson, Grace Chatto & Nicole Marshall	6:13
Total length:			20:03

== Charts ==
Chart (2014)	Peak position
UK Singles (OCC)	100
