= Solo (Clean Bandit song) =

2018 single by Clean Bandit featuring Demi Lovato

Single by Clean Bandit featuring Demi Lovato

from the album What Is Love?
- Released: 18 May 2018
- Studio: Club Ralph (London); Downtown Music Studios (New York); FAME Recording Studios (Muscle Shoals, Alabama); RAK Studios (London); Tileyard Studios (London)
- Genre: EDM
- Length: 3:42
- Label: Atlantic
- Songwriters: Grace Chatto; Jack Patterson; Camille Purcell; Demi Lovato; Fred Gibson
- Producers: Chatto; Patterson; Fred; Mark Ralph

Clean Bandit singles chronology
"I Miss You" (2017)	"Solo" (2018)	"Baby" (2018)

Demi Lovato singles chronology
"Fall in Line" (2018)	"Solo" (2018)	"Sober" (2018)

Music video
- "Solo" on YouTube

"Solo" is a song by British electronic music band Clean Bandit featuring guest vocals from American singer Demi Lovato and pitched backing vocals from British singer Kamille. It was released on 18 May 2018 through Atlantic Records as the fourth single from the band's second studio album, What Is Love? (2018). The song was written by Lovato, Kamille, Grace Chatto, Fred Gibson and Jack Patterson, and was produced by Chatto, Gibson, Patterson and Mark Ralph.

The song was a commercial success. It topped the charts in thirteen countries including the UK singles chart, earned Diamond certifications in France and Poland, and went platinum in Australia, Austria, Belgium, Canada, Denmark, Germany, Italy, Portugal, Spain, the United Kingdom and the United States. "Solo" was the most searched song on Shazam in 2018, with 9.1 million tags worldwide. It has over 1.2 billion streams on Spotify and the music video has over 1.1 billion views on YouTube.

== Background ==
The song was first revealed when a dancer posted on her Instagram Stories that she was starring in a Clean Bandit and Demi Lovato music video. Clean Bandit teased the song on 10 May 2018, writing on Instagram and Twitter: "Really excited to announce our new single Solo with Demi Lovato will be out 18/05." The announcement came with the song's cover art. Camille Purcell also disclosed in a tweet that she has been involved in the making of "Solo".

Grace Chatto of Clean Bandit told the London Evening Standard that "Solo" was based on her own experience with a "difficult break-up". She also revealed that the song was recorded over FaceTime because the band was unable to schedule a studio session with Lovato. "It was crazy. She was in Alabama in a studio and we were over here. You know when the connection is bad and the speed fluctuates? We couldn't hear that well, but it turned out really well."

== Composition ==
"Solo" is an upbeat EDM song about self-love in spite of a heartbreak. It is performed in the key of B minor in common time with a tempo of 105 beats per minute, following a progression of Bm–A–F♯m–G and Bm–A–D–G, and Lovato's vocals span from A_{3} to D_{5}. Described as a "summer anthem", it opens with a "buoyant production". The chorus consists of a mix of synth and vocoder effects.

== Commercial performance ==
"Solo" reached number one in the United Kingdom, becoming Clean Bandit's fourth UK chart-topper and Lovato's first number-one song in the nation. In Australia, the song has reached number 7, giving Clean Bandit their fourth and Lovato her second top 10 entry in the country. It additionally peaked at number one in Austria, the Czech Republic, Finland, Germany, Hungary, Ireland, Lithuania, Poland, Russia, Switzerland (Romandy) and Slovakia, as well as the top ten in Australia, Belgium, Croatia, Denmark, France, Greece, Latvia, Lebanon, Norway, Portugal, Romania, Scotland, Singapore, Slovenia, Sweden, and Switzerland (german-speaking part).

== Live performances ==
The song was added to the set list of the European leg of Lovato's Tell Me You Love Me World Tour. Clean Bandit performed the song during their set at the Capital FM Summertime Ball along with Lovato as a special guest on 9 June 2018.

== Music videos ==
The music video was released on 31 May 2018, starring the members of Clean Bandit and Demi Lovato. The video follows Clean Bandit's Grace Chatto and a "lover", actor George Todd McLachlan as they argue. As the arguments become violent, Chatto grabs her longboard and skates into town where she ends up at a laundromat. Hidden behind the washing machines in an office, she pays an attendant (Ko Hyojoo) for an unknown concoction. The video then follows Hyojoo, who skates with a longboard down the road, to retrieve this medicine which is being made for her by Jack and Luke Patterson. Before that, Luke suggests choosing the shape of a bearded dragon or a rabbit. Then they decide to choose the shape of a dog. In the end, with the help of the medicine, Chatto turns her abusive partner into a rainbow golden Labrador Retriever puppy. The video is briefly intercut with images of Chatto lying on a bed and a sun lounger with her face seemingly evaporating. Lovato briefly appears in a floral top as she sings the track's vocals. As of December 2023, the music video has garnered over 1 billion views on YouTube. A black and white acoustic version of the video was released on 15 June 2018.

On 17 August 2018, a Japanese version of the video was released. This video was filmed in Kyoto and focuses on the dichotomy of trying to break away from one's feelings and moving on from the past with the inner turmoil that comes along with it. The music video features a popular local dancer named Nana from the dance unit KiKiRara. Nana portrays the feeling of wanting to break away (dressed as a Maiko) as well as the feeling of wanting to hang on, portrayed as a lady-in-a-black costume. This music video was filmed in Japan's historical tourist sites in Kyoto, Japan. It was directed by Yutaka Obara.

== Track listing ==
- Digital download
1. "Solo" (featuring Demi Lovato) – 3:42
- Digital download – Wideboys remix
1. "Solo" (featuring Demi Lovato) (Wideboys remix) – 3:08
- Digital download – acoustic version
1. "Solo" (featuring Demi Lovato) (acoustic) – 3:45
- Digital download – Ofenbach remix
1. "Solo" (featuring Demi Lovato) (Ofenbach remix) – 3:48
- Digital download – Sofi Tukker remix
1. "Solo" (featuring Demi Lovato) (Sofi Tukker remix) – 3:24
- Digital download – M-22 remix
1. "Solo" (featuring Demi Lovato) (M-22 remix) – 5:15
- Digital download – Latin remix
1. "Solo" (featuring Demi Lovato) (Latin remix) – 3:42
- Digital download – Yxng Bane remix
1. "Solo" (featuring Demi Lovato) (Yxng Bane remix) – 3:41
- Digital download – Seeb remix
1. "Solo" (featuring Demi Lovato) (Seeb remix) – 3:14

== Credits and personnel ==
Credits adapted from Tidal and YouTube.

- Demi Lovato – vocals, songwriting
- Camille Purcell – backing vocals, songwriting
- Grace Chatto – production, songwriting, cello, mixing
- Jack Patterson – production, songwriting, guitar, mixing, synthesizer
- Fred – production, songwriting, keyboard, drum programming, synthesizer
- Mark Ralph – production, mixing
- Tom AD Fuller – mix engineering
- Stuart Hawkes – master engineering
- Mitch Allan – engineering
- Mike Horner – engineering
- Luke Patterson – percussion
- James Boyd – viola
- Beatrice Philips – violin
- Stephanie Benedetti – violin
- Scott Cutler – songwriting (acoustic version)
- Anne Preven – songwriting (acoustic version)

== Charts ==
=== Weekly charts ===
Weekly chart performance for "Solo"
Chart (2018–2026)	Peak position
Argentina Hot 100 (Billboard)	44
Australia (ARIA)	7
Australia Dance (ARIA)	1
Austria (Ö3 Austria Top 40)	1
Belarus Airplay (Eurofest)	1
Belgium (Ultratop 50 Flanders)	3
Belgium (Ultratop 50 Wallonia)	1
Bolivia Airplay (Monitor Latino)	6
Bulgaria Airlay (PROPHON)	1
Canada Hot 100 (Billboard)	14
Canada CHR/Top 40 (Billboard)	15
Colombia Airplay (National-Report)	47
Croatia International Airplay (Top lista)	2
Czech Republic Airplay (ČNS IFPI)	2
Czech Republic Singles Digital (ČNS IFPI)	1
CIS Airplay (TopHit)	1
Denmark (Tracklisten)	4
Ecuador Anglo Airplay (Monitor Latino)	3
Euro Digital Song Sales (Billboard)	1
Finland (Suomen virallinen lista)	1
France (SNEP)	4
Germany (GfK)	1
Greece Digital (IFPI Greece)	5
Hungary (Dance Top 40)	1
Hungary (Rádiós Top 40)	1
Ireland (IRMA)	1
Italy (FIMI)	16
Lebanon (Lebanese Top 20)	5
Luxembourg Digital Song Sales (Billboard)	2
Malaysia (RIM)	16
Mexico Airplay (Billboard)	16
Moldova Airplay (TopHit)	79
Netherlands (Dutch Top 40)	4
Netherlands (Single Top 100)	14
New Zealand (Recorded Music NZ)	21
Norway (VG-lista)	3
Poland Airplay (ZPAV)	1
Poland Dance (ZPAV)	2
Portugal (AFP)	5
Romania (Airplay 100)	3
Russia Airplay (TopHit)	1
Scottish Singles Sales (Official Charts)	2
Singapore (RIAS)	5
Slovakia Airplay (ČNS IFPI)	10
Slovakia Singles Digital (ČNS IFPI)	1
Spain (Promusicae)	27
Sweden (Sverigetopplistan)	2
Switzerland (Schweizer Hitparade)	2
Switzerland (Media Control Romandy)	1
Ukraine Airplay (TopHit)	10
UK Singles (Official Charts)	1
US Billboard Hot 100	58
US Adult Pop Airplay (Billboard)	40
US Dance Club Songs (Billboard)	22
US Hot Dance/Electronic Songs (Billboard)	4
US Pop Airplay (Billboard)	33
Venezuela Airplay (National-Report)	88

=== Year-end charts ===
2018 year-end chart performance for "Solo"
Chart (2018)	Position
Australia (ARIA)	67
Austria (Ö3 Austria Top 40)	4
Belgium (Ultratop Flanders)	12
Belgium (Ultratop Wallonia)	10
Bolivia (Monitor Latino)	61
Canada (Canadian Hot 100)	53
CIS (Tophit)	12
Denmark (Tracklisten)	22
Estonia (IFPI)	14
France (SNEP)	45
Germany (Official German Charts)	8
Hungary (Dance Top 40)	14
Hungary (Rádiós Top 40)	15
Iceland (Plötutíóindi)	10
Ireland (IRMA)	12
Italy (FIMI)	46
Netherlands (Dutch Top 40)	17
Netherlands (Single Top 100)	39
Poland (ZPAV)	4
Portugal (AFP)	31
Romania (Airplay 100)	39
Russia Airplay (Tophit)	13
Slovenia (SloTop50)	19
Spain (PROMUSICAE)	57
Sweden (Sverigetopplistan)	10
Switzerland (Schweizer Hitparade)	15
Ukraine Airplay (Tophit)	116
UK Singles (Official Charts Company)	16
US Hot Dance/Electronic Songs (Billboard)	9

2019 year-end chart performance for "Solo"
Chart (2019)	Position
CIS (Tophit)	143
Hungary (Dance Top 40)	8
Hungary (Rádiós Top 40)	17
Poland (ZPAV)	88
Ukraine Airplay (Tophit)	71

== Certifications ==
Certifications and sales for "Solo"
Region	Certification	Certified units/sales
Australia (ARIA)	3× Platinum	210,000^{‡}
Austria (IFPI Austria)	2× Platinum	60,000^{‡}
Belgium (BRMA)	Platinum	40,000^{‡}
Canada (Music Canada)	4× Platinum	320,000^{‡}
Denmark (IFPI Danmark)	2× Platinum	180,000^{‡}
France (SNEP)	Diamond	333,333^{‡}
Germany (BVMI)	3× Gold	600,000^{‡}
Italy (FIMI)	2× Platinum	100,000^{‡}
New Zealand (RMNZ)	2× Platinum	60,000^{‡}
Norway (IFPI Norway)	3× Platinum	180,000^{‡}
Poland (ZPAV)	Diamond	100,000^{‡}
Portugal (AFP)	2× Platinum	20,000^{‡}
Spain (Promusicae)	2× Platinum	120,000^{‡}
United Kingdom (BPI)	3× Platinum	1,800,000^{‡}
United States (RIAA)	Platinum	1,000,000^{‡}
^{‡} Sales+streaming figures based on certification alone.

== Release history ==
Release dates for "Solo"
Region	Date	Format	Version	Label	Ref.
Various	18 May 2018	Digital download; streaming	Original	Atlantic	
Italy	25 May 2018	Contemporary hit radio	Original	Warner	
United Kingdom	25 May 2018	Contemporary hit radio	Original	Warner	
Various	25 May 2018	Digital download; streaming	Wideboys remix	Atlantic	
Various	15 June 2018	Digital download; streaming	Acoustic	Atlantic	
Various	15 June 2018	Digital download; streaming	Ofenbach remix	Atlantic	
Various	15 June 2018	Digital download; streaming	Sofi Tukker remix	Atlantic	
United States	19 June 2018	Contemporary hit radio	Original	Big Beat	
United States	25 June 2018	Hot adult contemporary	Original	Big Beat	
Various	29 June 2018	Digital download; streaming	M-22 remix	Atlantic	
Various	20 July 2018	Digital download; streaming	Latin remix	Atlantic	
Various	27 July 2018	Digital download; streaming	Yxng Bane remix	Atlantic	
Various	3 August 2018	Digital download; streaming	Seeb remix	Atlantic	
