= Everything but You (Clean Bandit song) =

Single by Clean Bandit featuring A7S
- Released: 18 February 2022
- Length: 3:18
- Label: Atlantic UK
- Songwriters: Grace Chatto; Jack Patterson; Nick Gale; Alexander Tidebrink; Tom Grennan; Philip Plested
- Producers: Digital Farm Animals; Mark Ralph; Jack Patterson; Lewis Thompson

Clean Bandit singles chronology
"How Will I Know" (2021)	"Everything but You" (2022)	"Sad Girls" (2022)

A7S singles chronology
"Nirvana" (2021)	"Everything but You" (2022)	"On and On" (2022)

Music video
- "Everything but You" on YouTube

"Everything but You" is a song by English group Clean Bandit featuring Swedish producer A7S. The song was released on 18 February 2022 by label Atlantic Records UK. The song was written by Clean Bandit members Grace Chatto and Jack Patterson, alongside A7S, Digital Farm Animals, Tom Grennan and Phil Plested.

== Charts ==
=== Weekly charts ===
Weekly chart performance for "Everything but You"
Chart (2022)	Peak position
San Marino (SMRRTV Top 50)	38
Slovakia Airplay (ČNS IFPI)	53
UK Singles (OCC)	55
UK Dance (OCC)	21
US Hot Dance/Electronic Songs (Billboard)	20

=== Year-end charts ===
Year-end chart performance for "Everything but You"
Chart (2022)	Position
US Hot Dance/Electronic Songs (Billboard)	93
