= Clean Bandit =

English electronic music group

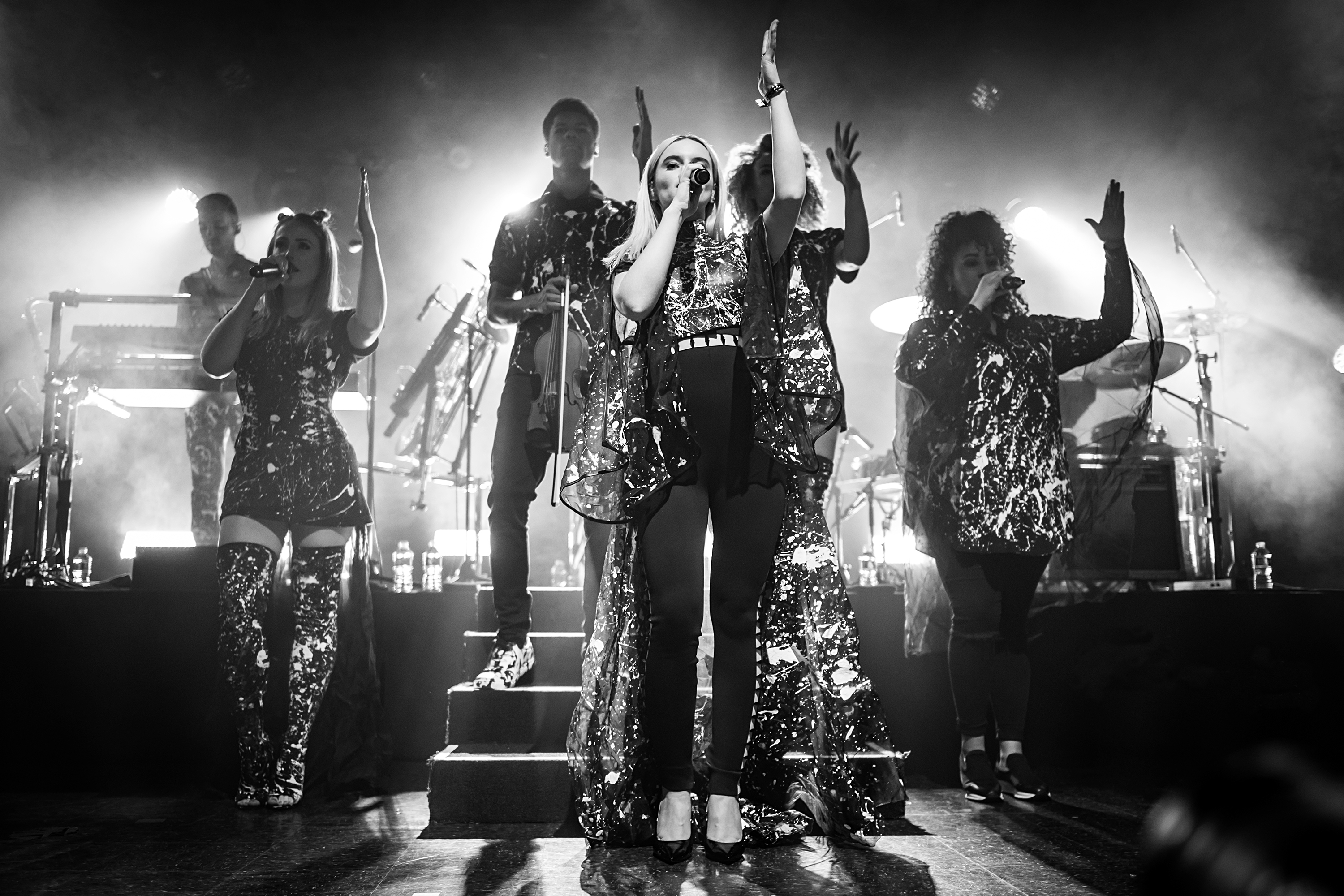
- Clean Bandit in 2016

Background information
- Origin: Cambridge, England
- Genres: Electronic; classical crossover; electropop; dance-pop
- Works: Discography
- Years active: 2008–present
- Labels: Atlantic; Big Beat; Black Butter; CB X; The Orchard; Ministry of Sound
- Spinoffs: Massive Violins
- Members: Grace Chatto; Jack Patterson; Luke Patterson
- Past members: Lydia Scadding; Shiry Rashkovsky; Ssegawa-Ssekintu Kiwanuka (Love Ssega); Neil Amin-Smith
- Website: cleanbandit.co.uk

Clean Bandit are an English electronic music group formed in Cambridge in 2008. They have achieved four number-one singles and six additional top-ten songs on the UK Official Singles Chart. The instrumental band, made up of Grace Chatto and brothers Jack and Luke Patterson, feature guest vocalists on their songs. Jack Patterson serves as the principal songwriter and music video director, while Grace co-produces the music, produces the music videos and manages the project. The group is known for blending elements of classical music and contemporary dance music, and they routinely collaborate with guest vocalists.

Clean Bandit's debut single, "A+E", was released in 2012; their second, "Mozart's House" (2013), peaked at number 17 on the UK singles chart. In 2014, they attained mainstream success with their single "Rather Be", a collaboration with Jess Glynne. It reached number one on the UK singles chart, topped the national singles charts of six other countries, and peaked at number ten on the US Billboard Hot 100. The song's accolades include a Grammy Award for Best Dance Recording and two Ivor Novello Awards for Jack Patterson. These three singles were included on the group's debut album New Eyes, released in June 2014, which received a gold certification from the BPI. Clean Bandit's 2016 single "Rockabye", which features Sean Paul and Anne-Marie, became their second number-one song in the UK and that year's UK Christmas number-one single. It peaked at number one in seven other markets and charted at number nine in the United States. In 2017, "Symphony", featuring Zara Larsson, became the group's third UK number-one song; this was followed by their fourth, "Solo", featuring Demi Lovato, in 2018. Their second album, What Is Love?, was released in November 2018 and contains all three singles. As of 2016, Clean Bandit had sold over 13 million singles and 1.6 million albums worldwide.

== History ==
=== 2008–2012: Formation and career beginnings ===
Original band members Grace Chatto and Jack Patterson met while studying as undergraduates at Jesus College, University of Cambridge. Jack was interested in Chatto’s classical string quartet, The Chatto Quartet, led at the time by violinist Neil Amin-Smith, Lydia Scadding and Shiry Rashkovsky, and began making samples using recordings of the string quartet’s concerts. Jack then enlisted his younger brother Luke Patterson on the drums. Grace and Jack’s friend Ssegawa-Ssekintu Kiwanuka (also known as Love Ssega and MC Ssegamic) joined as the original vocalist, but later left to undertake a PhD in laser analytics. In 2011, Chatto and Jack Patterson formed their own film production company, Cleanfilm, to make music videos for themselves and other artists.

The band's name, Clean Bandit, comes from a translation of a Russian phrase from Chatto's friend, describing her sister Anna Blundy as "clean bandit"; the meaning is similar to the English phrase "complete bastard", though Patterson later stated that it is actually a more affectionate term similar to "utter rascal".

=== 2012–2015: New Eyes ===
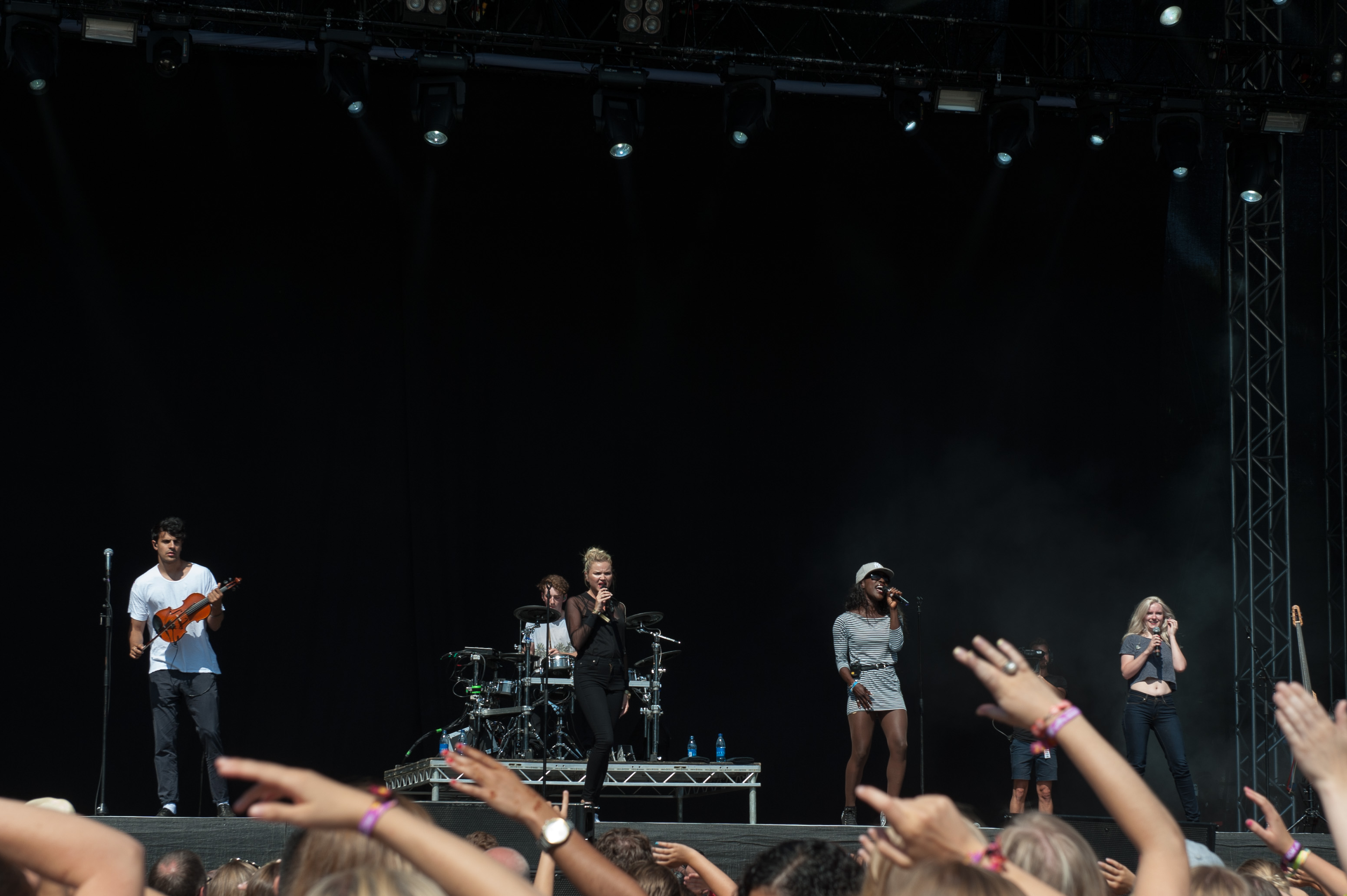
Clean Bandit, along with singers Florence Rawlings and Elisabeth Troy, at Way Out West in Gothenburg, Sweden, August 2014

In December 2012, Clean Bandit released their debut single "A+E", which peaked at number 100 on the UK Singles Chart. In March 2013, they released their second single "Mozart's House". The song peaked at number 17 on the UK Singles Chart. Their third single "Dust Clears" charted at number 43 in the UK. The band's fourth single "Rather Be" featuring Jess Glynne was released in January 2014 and topped the UK Singles Chart. It was the fastest-selling song released in January since 1996 and ended 2014 as the year's second best-selling song in the UK (behind "Happy" by Pharrell Williams), selling over 1.13 million copies. "Rather Be" also reached number one in Austria, Finland, Germany, Netherlands, Norway and Sweden, whilst charting at number ten on the US Billboard Hot 100. In April 2014, the band made their TV debut on BBC's Later... with Jools Holland. The following month, they announced a 14-date headline tour of the UK kicking off in Lancaster Library as part of the Get It Loud In Libraries campaign. The band's debut studio album New Eyes, was released in June 2014 by Atlantic Records UK. In September 2014, they performed with the BBC Philharmonic Orchestra at MediaCityUK. In November, the band collaborated again with Jess Glynne, on their single "Real Love". It reached number two on the UK Singles Chart. The same month, the band performed as part of the charity group Band Aid 30 alongside other British and Irish pop acts, recording the latest version of the track "Do They Know It's Christmas?" to raise money for the 2014 Ebola crisis in West Africa.

In February 2015, "Rather Be" won the Grammy Award for Best Dance Recording at the 57th Annual Grammy Awards. The group recorded a 30-piece orchestral version of "Rather Be" at Abbey Road Studios for Marks & Spencer's Christmas 2015 advertising campaign.

In June 2015, the group performed at the closing ceremony of the 2015 European Games in Baku, Azerbaijan, appearing among the final acts of the event’s concert programme, with vocals performed by Elisabeth Troy.

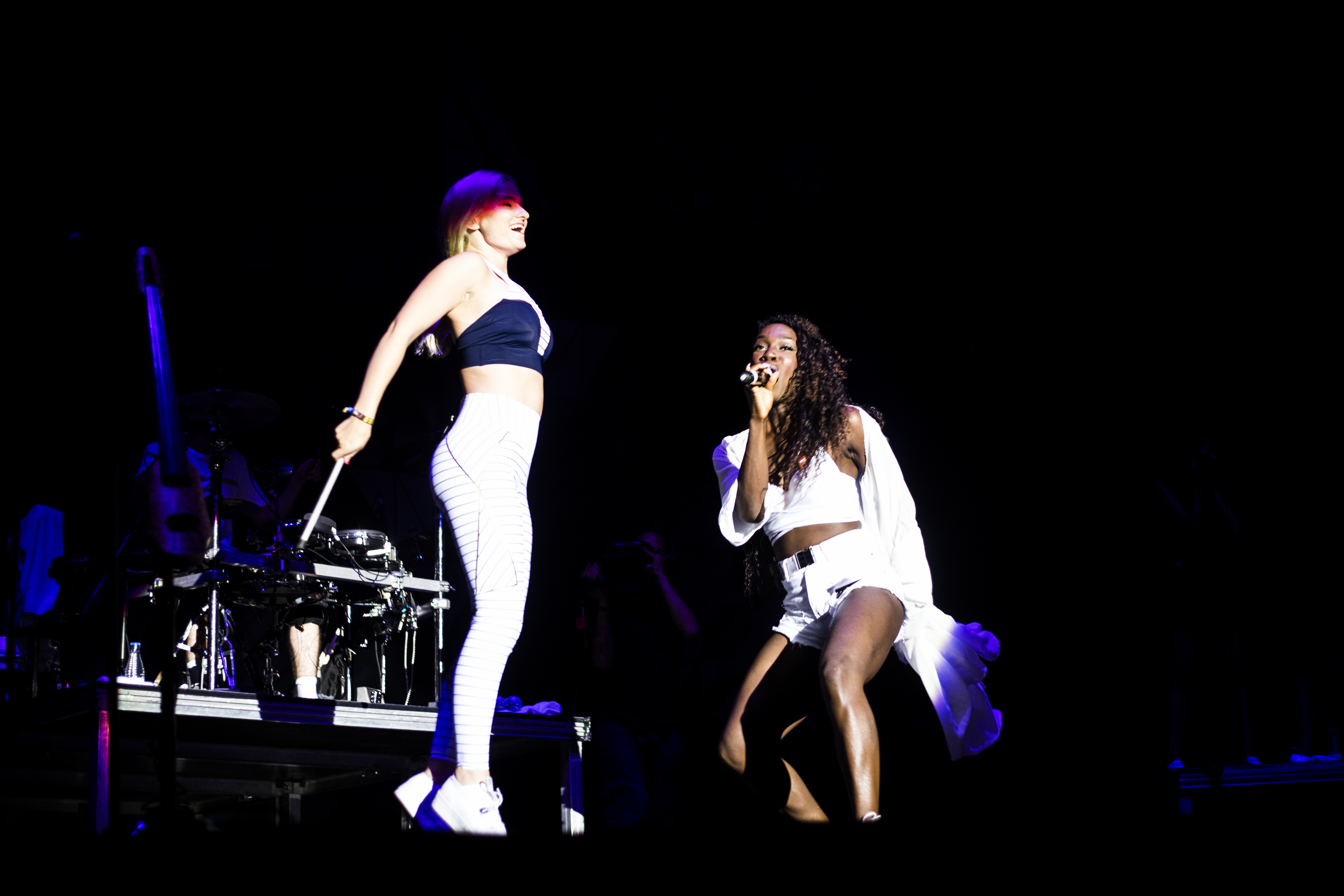
Chatto with Elisabeth Troy at FIB 2015

=== 2016–2019: What Is Love? and Neil Amin-Smith's departure ===
In May 2016, the band released the single "Tears" featuring The X Factor 2015 winner Louisa Johnson, which later appeared in their second studio album. The song peaked at number five in the UK, following a performance on Britain's Got Talent.

In October 2016, it was announced that violinist and pianist Amin-Smith had decided to leave Clean Bandit. Two days later, the group released their first song as a three-piece without Amin-Smith: "Rockabye", which features rapper Sean Paul and singer Anne-Marie. "Rockabye" became their second number one hit in the UK, and remained at the top spot for nine weeks. It went on to become the Christmas number one single for 2016. The song also reached number one in Ireland, Australia, New Zealand, Germany, Italy, Sweden and Switzerland. It additionally charted at number nine on the US Billboard Hot 100. In March 2017, the trio released "Symphony", a collaboration with Swedish singer Zara Larsson. The song topped the UK Singles Chart, becoming the group's third number one single in the country. They gave their first live performance of the song on The Voice UK. "Rockabye" was recorded at The Crypt Studio in London. In June, the band released the studio version of "Disconnect" with Marina Diamandis. The track was previously performed at the 2015 Coachella Festival.

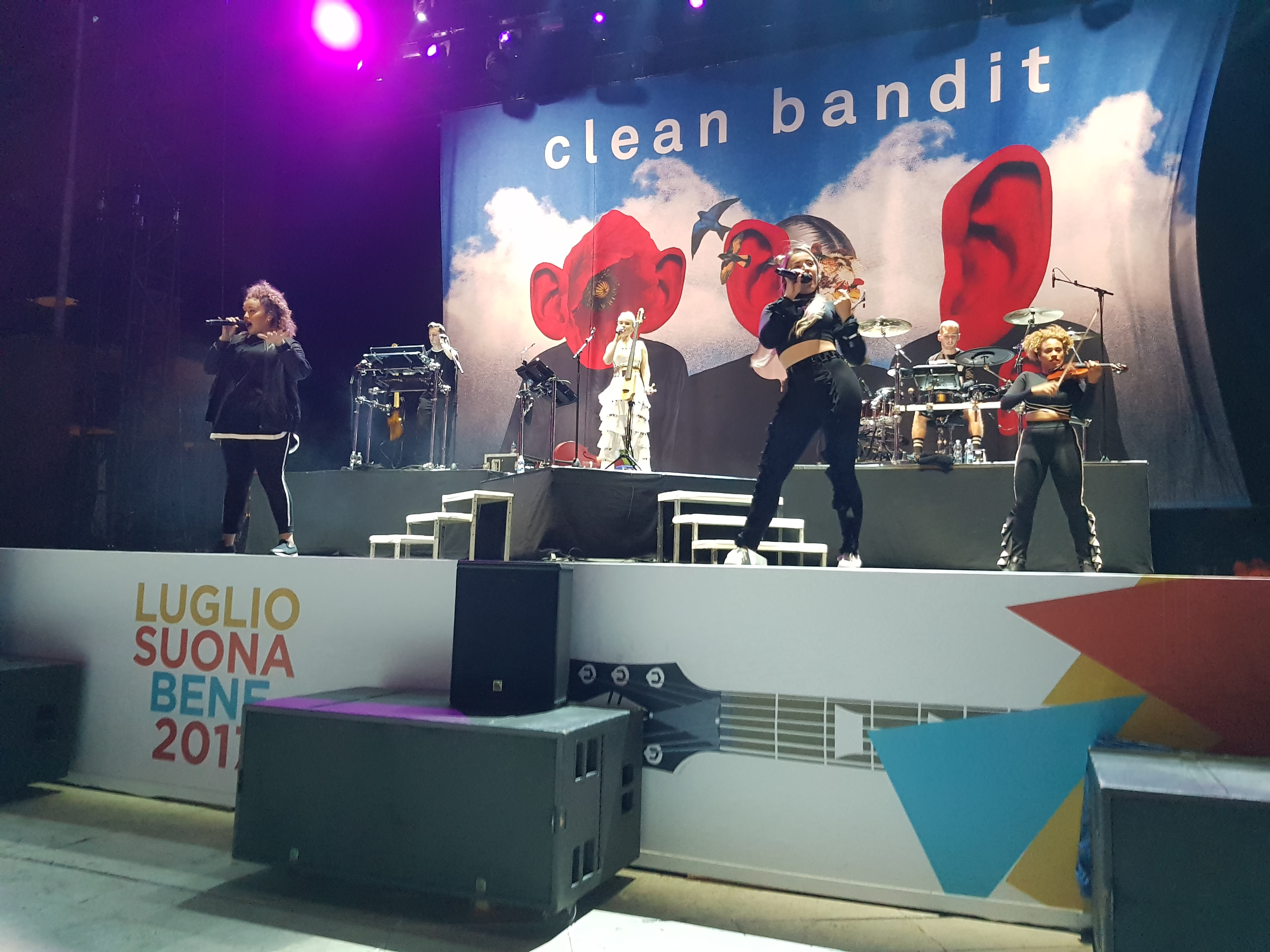
Clean Bandit on stage in Rome on 28 June 2017

In October 2017, the band announced the single "I Miss You", featuring songwriter Julia Michaels. It charted within the top five of the UK and has been certified platinum. In May 2018, the band released the second album's fifth single, "Solo", featuring vocals from Demi Lovato. It topped the charts in the UK the following month and has received a platinum certification in the country. In November 2018, sixth single "Baby" was released, featuring Marina and Luis Fonsi. Clean Bandit released their second album What Is Love? in November 2018. The album features collaborations with Rita Ora, Ellie Goulding, Craig David, Anne-Marie, and Charli XCX.

=== 2020–present: Leaving Atlantic Records, forthcoming third studio album and new projects ===
Against the backdrop of the COVID-19 pandemic, the band produced a "House Party" event fortnightly in place of the live shows which they would've performed if the pandemic had not happened. Clean Bandit produced six of these house parties in total, from April to July, many featuring vocals from their singer Yasmin Green.

In early August 2020, as their live home music performances gained credit, the band agreed with Global Citizen to host a 12-hour long "Houseparty Against Hunger" on 8 August, to raise money for the charity to help fight poverty-related hunger. The event consisted of one hour-long sets from DJs around the world. Clean Bandit hosted the event and played at the start and end of proceedings, with their set-up the same as that used in their original house parties. Kirsten Joy, one of the band's singers, performed along with Becky Hill, Joel Corry, MNEK and a guest appearance from Sean Paul.

On 17 August, Clean Bandit announced they would be releasing a new single, titled "Tick Tock" with singer Mabel and rapper 24kGoldn. It was released on 21 August 2020.

On 26 January 2021, Clean Bandit announced their new single "Higher" featuring American rapper Iann Dior. The song was released on 29 January 2021.

On 30 July 2021, Clean Bandit released their new single "Drive" with German DJ Topic featuring Wes Nelson.

On 24 September 2021, Clean Bandit released a remix of the famous 1980s hit song How Will I Know in collaboration with the late Whitney Houston.

On 18 February 2022, Clean Bandit released a new dance/electronic song featuring A7S called "Everything but You".

On 9 September 2022, Clean Bandit released a new single "Sad Girls" with rapper French the Kid featuring Rema.

On 21 October 2022, Clean Bandit released another single, "Don't Leave Me Lonely" in collaboration with the songwriter Elley Duhé.

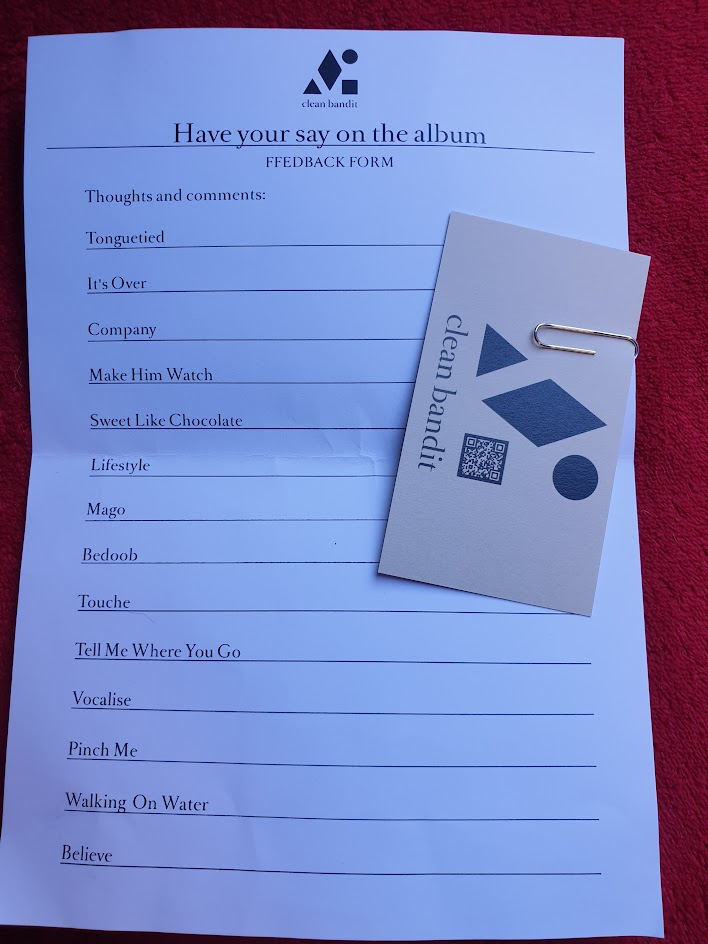
A feedback form from a 28 February 2025 Clean Bandit and Friends concert in London, UK, seeking audience members' views on new material from their forthcoming album.

On 2024, Clean Bandit parted ways with their label Atlantic Records.

On 23 July 2024, Clean Bandit announced their song with English singer-songwriter Anne-Marie and French DJ David Guetta called "Cry Baby". It was released on 9 August 2024 with B1 Records/Ministry of Sound.

On 26 April 2025, Clean Bandit released a new single, "Tell Me Where U Go", a trance inspired anthem with Tiesto and featuring German vocalist Leony. "Tell Me Where U Go" is also the first track since Tears to feature violin by former member Neil Amin-Smith.

On 4 July 2025, Clean Bandit released their first single independently called "Believe" featuring vocals from South African singer Lloyiso.

On 12 June 2026, Clean Bandit announced a new single, "I Don't Wanna Hurt You", featuring Irish rapper Biig Piig, it was released on 17 June 2026 under group independent label CB X.

On 18 September 2026, Clean Bandit released a new single, "Company", featuring American singer Chlöe and Nigerian singer Omah Lay.

On 23 October 2026, Clean Bandit released the single "La Dolce Vita", a collaboration with Palestinian-Italian singer Tära.

== Musical style ==
Clean Bandit are an electronic, electropop and dance-pop band. The band mixes electronic music with classical pieces by composers such as Mozart and Shostakovich.

== Political views ==
In May 2017, Clean Bandit endorsed the Labour Party and Jeremy Corbyn in the 2017 UK general election. In June, the band supported a Labour Party rally in Birmingham.

In June 2018, they headlined the Labour Live festival in London.

In November 2019, they endorsed the Labour Party in the 2019 UK general election. In December 2019, along with 42 other leading cultural figures, they signed a letter stating that "Labour's election manifesto under Jeremy Corbyn's leadership offers a transformative plan that prioritises the needs of people and the planet over private profit and the vested interests of a few. "

They endorsed Rebecca Long-Bailey in the 2020 Labour Party leadership election.

After leaving the band, Neil Amin-Smith joined the Institute for Fiscal Studies and in July 2024 was appointed by Labour chancellor Rachel Reeves to a government council of economic advisors.

== Members ==
Current members

- Grace Chatto – violin, cello, keyboards, percussion, vocals (2008–present)
- Jack Patterson – keyboards, vocals, piano, bass, guitar, violin, production, turntables, saxophone (2008–present)
- Luke Patterson – drums, percussion (2008–present)

Former members

- Neil Amin-Smith – violin, piano (2008–2016, 2024, 2025; on "Cry Baby" and "Tell Me Where U Go")
- Ssegawa-Ssekintu Kiwanuka (Love Ssega) – vocals (2008–2010)
- Lydia Scadding – violin (2008–2010)
- Shiry Rashkovsky – violin (2008–2010)

Current touring musicians

- Kirsten Joy – vocals (2016–present)
- Sam Skirrow – bass, keyboards, music director (2017–present)
- Molly Fletcher – violin (2018, 2025–present)
- Nate Notes – guitar, keyboards, programming (2025–present)
- Emma Fry – violin (2019–2022, 2026–present)
- Phebe Edwards – vocals (2026–present)
- Sally Potterton – violin (2026–present)

Former touring musicians

- Nikki Cislyn – vocals (2012–2013)
- Makeda Moore – vocals (2012–2013)
- Eliza Shaddad – vocals (2012–2013)
- Florence Rawlings – vocals (2013–2016)
- Elisabeth Troy – vocals (2013–2016)
- Tina Hizon – vocals, violin, piano (2013–2016)
- Ezinma – violin (2017)
- David Gane – drums, percussion (2018)
- Braimah Kanneh-Mason – violin (2016–2017, 2025)
- Kelli-Leigh – vocals (2025)
- Stephanie Benedetti – violin (2016–2026)
- Yasmin Green – vocals (2016–2026)
- Tess Burrstone – vocals, rapping, hype man (2023–2026)

== Discography ==
- New Eyes (2014)
- What Is Love? (2018)

== Awards and nominations ==
Year	Awards	Category	Recipient	Outcome
2011	UK Music Video Awards	Best Dance Video - Budget	"Mozart's House"	Nominated
2011	UK Music Video Awards	Best Pop Video - Budget	"Telephone Banking"	Nominated
2014	Urban Music Awards	Best Electronic/Dance Act	Clean Bandit	Won
2014	BBC Music Awards	Song of the Year	"Rather Be"	Nominated
2014	Los Premios 40 Principales América	Best English Language Song	"Rather Be"	Nominated
2015	Brit Awards	British Group	Clean Bandit	Nominated
2015	Brit Awards	British Single of the Year	"Rather Be"	Nominated
2015	APRA Awards	International Work of the Year	"Rather Be"	Nominated
2015	Grammy Award	Best Dance Recording	"Rather Be"	Won
2015	Ivor Novello Awards	Most Performed Work	"Rather Be"	Won
2015	Ivor Novello Awards	Best Contemporary Song	"Rather Be"	Won
2015	Billboard Music Award	Top Dance/Electronic Artist	Clean Bandit	Nominated
2015	Billboard Music Award	Top Dance/Electronic Song	"Rather Be"	Nominated
2015	Hungarian Music Awards	Modern Pop/Rock Album of the Year	New Eyes	Nominated
2017	Brit Awards	British Single of the Year	"Rockabye"	Nominated
2017	Brit Awards	British Video	"Rockabye"	Nominated
2017	MTV Europe Music Awards	Best Song	"Rockabye"	Nominated
2017	Teen Choice Awards	Best Dance/Electronic Song	"Rockabye"	Nominated
2017	Gaygalan Awards	International Song of the Year	"Rockabye"	Nominated
2017	LOS40 Music Awards	International Song of the Year	"Rockabye"	Nominated
2017	Danish Music Awards	International Hit of the Year	"Rockabye"	Nominated
2017	NRJ Music Awards	International Duo/Group of the Year	Clean Bandit	Nominated
2018	Global Awards	Best Group	Clean Bandit	Nominated
2018	Global Awards	Mass Appeal Award	Clean Bandit	Nominated
2018	Radio Disney Music Awards	Best Group	Clean Bandit	Nominated
2018	Brit Awards	British Single of the Year	"Symphony"	Nominated
2018	Brit Awards	British Video of the Year	"Symphony"	Eliminated
2018	Gaygalan Awards	Best International Song of the Year	"Symphony"	Won
2018	Danish GAFFA Awards	Best International Song of the Year	"Symphony"	Nominated
2018	Sweden GAFFA Awards	Best Swedish Song of the Year	"Symphony"	Won
2018	P3 Gold Awards	Song of the Year	"Symphony"	Nominated
2018	Scandipop Awards	Best Dance/Pop Song	"Symphony"	Won
2018	Pop Awards	Song Of The Year Award	"Symphony"	Nominated
2018	ASCAP London Awards	Winning EDM Songs	"Symphony"	Won
2018	ASCAP London Awards	Winning EDM Songs	"Rockabye"	Won
2018	ASCAP London Awards	Winning Hot 100 Songs	"Rockabye"	Won
2018	WDM Radio Awards	Best Global Track	"Rockabye"	Won
2018	Billboard Music Awards	Top Dance/Electronic Song	"Rockabye"	Nominated
2018	Teen Choice Awards	Choice Electronic/Dance Song	"Solo"	Nominated
2018	MTV Europe Music Awards	Best World Stage	Clean Bandit	Nominated
2018	BBC Radio 1's Teen Awards	Best British Group	Clean Bandit	Nominated
2019	Global Awards	Best Group	Clean Bandit	Nominated
2019	Global Awards	Best British Artist or Group	Clean Bandit	Nominated
2019	Global Awards	Best Song	"Solo"	Nominated
2019	Brit Awards	British Single of the Year	"Solo"	Nominated
2019	Brit Awards	British Video of the Year	"Solo"	Nominated
2019	Swedish GAFFA Awards	International Song of the Year	"Solo"	Nominated
2019	Billboard Music Awards	Top Dance/Electronic Album	What is Love?	Nominated
2022	Berlin Music Video Awards	Best Concept	Everything but You	Nominated
2023	British Phonographic Industry	Brits Billion Award	Clean Bandit	Won
