= Band Aid 30 =

2014 British charity supergroup

- Origin: UK
- Genre: Christmas
- Years active: 2014

Band Aid 30 is the 2014 incarnation of the charity supergroup Band Aid. The group was announced on 10 November 2014 by Bob Geldof and Midge Ure, with Geldof stating that he took the step after the United Nations had contacted him, saying help was urgently needed to prevent the 2014 Ebola crisis in Western Africa spreading throughout the world. As in previous incarnations, the group covered the track "Do They Know It's Christmas?", written in 1984 by Geldof and Ure, this time to raise money towards the Ebola crisis in Western Africa. The track re-tweaked lyrics to reflect the Ebola virus epidemic in West Africa, and all proceeds went towards battling what Geldof described as a "particularly pernicious illness because it renders humans untouchable and that is sickening".

The song was recorded by some of the biggest-selling current British and Irish pop acts, including One Direction, Sam Smith, Ed Sheeran, Emeli Sandé, Ellie Goulding and Rita Ora. Bastille and Guy Garvey of Mercury prize-winning band Elbow were also on board, along with Chris Martin (Coldplay) and Bono (U2)—the third time he has contributed to a Band Aid recording.

For the first time, different language versions were recorded, a French one titled "Noël est là" and a German one titled "Do They Know It's Christmas? (2014) [Deutsche Version]" with respective artists.

== Recording ==
The song was recorded on 15 November 2014, with all contributions going towards battling the Ebola virus epidemic in West Africa. Due to her filming commitments on The Voice UK, Rita Ora recorded her lines first thing in the morning, and was not present for the whole group chorus (although the video cuts to her singing alone along with them). The song was recorded in Sarm West Studios in Notting Hill, London, the same studio used for the original track. Organiser Bob Geldof said he addressed the participants "like the headmaster" before they sang the chorus: "I explained the situation in West Africa, I explained what the UN were saying, explained what we could do, and just geed them up."

Footage of the recording of the session was streamed live on an official app, with the footage forming the basis for the music video. The record was produced by Paul Epworth, who has worked with the likes of Adele and One Direction.

== Release ==
The official music video for Band Aid 30 was first shown on the results show of The X Factor on 16 November 2014, with Geldof suggesting that the song and video shown on The X Factor may not be the finished versions. "We'll have a rough edit on The X Factor and we'll have a rough edit of the film," he said. The video was introduced by Geldof, who described the new recording as a "bit of pop history". He said the video—which began with shots of victims of Ebola—was "harrowing and not meant for an entertainment show" but was something The X Factor audience should see.

Following this, the song was available for digital download on 17 November 2014, just 11 days short of the 30th anniversary of the release of the original version of the track. The physical version of the song will be released three weeks later on 8 December, and will feature cover artwork designed by artist Tracey Emin. The download costs 99p, while the CD single will retail for £4. The song will not be made available on Spotify and other music streaming services until January 2015.

On 15 November 2014, it was confirmed by Geldof that the Chancellor George Osborne would waive VAT on the record, with all the money raised by the track going towards the cause. He also confirmed in interviews that iTunes is not taking a cut of the 99p download cost.

On 18 November 2014, the BBC reported that the song was the fastest selling single of the year so far, with 206,000 copies sold since its release the day before. Martin Talbot, Chief executive of the Official Charts Company, said: "Everyone expected a strong start from Bob Geldof and his team, but they have outperformed expectations with a truly exceptional first day's sales." This makes it the fastest selling single since the Military Wives track "Wherever You Are" in December 2011.

== Participants ==
The line up for Band Aid 30:

=== Organisers and producers ===
- Bob Geldof – organiser
- Midge Ure – organiser
- Paul Epworth – producer

=== Instruments ===
- Roger Taylor (from Queen) – drums, keyboards
- Neil Amin-Smith (from Clean Bandit) – violin
- Grace Chatto (from Clean Bandit) – cello

=== Vocals ===
- Bono (from U2)
- Clean Bandit
- Paloma Faith
- Guy Garvey (from Elbow)
- Ellie Goulding
- Angélique Kidjo
- Chris Martin (from Coldplay)
- Sinéad O'Connor
- One Direction
- Olly Murs
- Rita Ora
- Emeli Sandé
- Seal
- Ed Sheeran
- Bastille
- Sam Smith
- Underworld
- Jessie Ware

=== Remixes ===
- High Contrast

== Lyrics ==
Unlike Band Aid II and Band Aid 20, where lyrics were almost identical to the original, the lyrics to "Do They Know It's Christmas?" for Band Aid 30 have been altered to address the current situation in Western Africa, with the ongoing Ebola epidemic. The changes include:

- "Where the only water flowing is the bitter sting of tears" replaced with "Where a kiss of love can kill you and there's death in every tear"
- "Well tonight thank God it's them instead of you" replaced with "Well tonight we're reaching out and touching you"

== Artwork ==
British artist Tracey Emin designed the cover sleeve for the physical release of the single.

== Chart performance ==
After release for download, the single went straight to number one in the UK Official Singles Chart for week ending 29 November 2014 having sold 312,000 copies. It dropped the following week. On its physical release on 8 December, it reached number three. The UK version of the song reached number 25 in France, number 2 in Germany and number 1 in Spain and Ireland.

== Critical reception ==
Initial response to the single was mixed. The Daily Telegraph noted how "technically impressive the current generation of British pop singers are.... [with the artists putting in] a hell of a lot into every over-stretched syllable", although noted that the "jump cut from distressing Third World scenes to smiling first world celebrities will always strike an awkward note". The Guardian noted that in contrast to previous versions of the track, it was "more sombre and downbeat: it features plenty of representatives from the vogueish world of pop-house but their actual sound doesn’t impact on the track at all". Finally, Digital Spy were heavily critical of the single stating that they wouldn't "be bullied into buying a mediocre record when there are plenty of other ways to donate and do your bit to help". The Independent criticised the song for retaining what was described as perpetuating the patronising and condescending perspective of the original, with rapper Fuse ODG citing this as the reason he dropped out of the project.

On 18 November, Liberian Robtel Neajai Pailey, a researcher at the School of Oriental and African Studies, argued on BBC Radio 4's Today that the question "Do They Know It's Christmas?" was meaningless, as most of the victims were Muslim. She described the song as "unoriginal and redundant" and said that it was "reinforcing stereotypes", painting the continent "as unchanging and frozen in time" and was "incredibly patronising and problematic." Arguing against Pailey, producer Harvey Goldsmith said her concerns were "ridiculous", adding "I think it's disingenuous for people to turn round and say we shouldn't do anything or sit back and watch it all happen or wait for all those countries that pledged aid and refused to give it so far." For Al Jazeera Paley wrote "It reeks of the "white saviour complex" because it negates local efforts that have come before it."

On 23 November, singer Lily Allen revealed that she had refused to appear on the record because she considered it "smug" and preferred to donate "actual money".

In December 2014, Ebola survivor, William Pooley, described the song as "cultural ignorance" and "cringeworthy". Bob Geldof responded by saying "Please. It's a pop song. Relax." He also said that those critical of the lyrics could "fuck off".

== Track listing ==
Digital download
No.	Title	Length
1.	"Do They Know It's Christmas? (2014)"	3:48

CD single
No.	Title	Length
1.	"Do They Know It's Christmas? Band Aid 30 (2014 version)"
2.	"Do They Know It's Christmas? Band Aid 20 (2004 version)"
3.	"Do They Know It's Christmas? Band Aid II (1989 version)"
4.	"Do They Know It's Christmas? Band Aid (1984 version)"

== Release history ==
The release history for the tracks is as follows:

Version	Country	Date	Format	Label
Do They Know It's Christmas? (2014)	United Kingdom	17 November 2014	Digital download	Virgin EMI Records; Universal Music
Do They Know It's Christmas? (2014)	United Kingdom	8 December 2014	CD single	Virgin EMI Records; Universal Music

== Other versions ==
Bob Geldof confirmed that there would be French and German versions of the track, with Carla Bruni leading the French and Die Toten Hosen lead vocalist Campino leading the German version.

=== German ===
The German version "Do They Know It's Christmas? (2014) [Deutsche Version]" performed well in the charts, reaching the best-seller position in the beginning of December 2014.

Involved artists and bands sorted by their appearance in the German Band Aid 30 song "Do They Know It's Christmas":
Campino of Die Toten Hosen, Philipp Poisel, Clueso, Seeed, Andreas Bourani, Ina Müller, Jan Delay, Marteria, Michi Beck of Die Fantastischen Vier, Max Herre, Cro, Sportfreunde Stiller, Silbermond, Milky Chance, Max Raabe, Wolfgang Niedecken, Udo Lindenberg, Sammy Amara of Broilers, Anna Loos, Peter Maffay, Thees Uhlmann, Joy Denalane, Gentleman, Patrice, Jan Josef Liefers, Adel Tawil, 2raumwohnung, Donots, Jennifer Rostock

Chart (2007)	Peak position
Ö3 Top 40 Austrian Singles Chart	10
German Singles Chart	1
Hitparade Swiss Singles Chart	21

=== French ===
The French version of the song, titled "Noël est là" ("Christmas is here"), features words by Carla Bruni and was released on 1 December 2014. Artists featured in the recording include Renaud, Nicola Sirkis, Benjamin Biolay, Vanessa Paradis, Joey Starr, Yannick Noah, Thomas Dutronc, Amandine Bourgeois, Louis Bertignac, Tété and Christophe Willem. It entered the French singles chart at number 58. It also charted in Belgium Wallonia Francophone market.

Chart (2007)	Peak position
Ultratop Belgian (Wallonia) Singles Chart	46
SNEP French Singles Chart	58
