= New Eyes =

Studio album by Clean Bandit
- Released: 30 May 2014
- Recorded: 2010–2014
- Length: 50:28
- Label: Atlantic
- Producer: Jack Patterson; Grace Chatto; Mark Ralph

Clean Bandit chronology
| New Eyes (2014) | What Is Love? (2018) |

Singles from New Eyes
- 1. "A+E" Released: 7 December 2012; 2. "Mozart's House" Released: 29 March 2013; 3. "Dust Clears" Released: 19 July 2013; 4. "Rather Be" Released: 17 January 2014; 5. "Extraordinary" Released: 16 May 2014; 6. "Come Over" Released: 8 August 2014

Singles from New Eyes (special edition)
- 1. "Real Love" Released: 16 November 2014; 2. "Stronger" Released: 19 April 2015

New Eyes is the debut studio album by English electronic music group Clean Bandit, released on 30 May 2014 by Atlantic Records in Germany and Ireland, and 2 June 2014 in the United Kingdom, after suffering from several setbacks. The album includes the singles "A+E", "Mozart's House", "Dust Clears", "Rather Be", "Extraordinary" and "Come Over". New Eyes was produced entirely by group members Jack Patterson and Grace Chatto. The album peaked at number three on the UK Albums Chart and was certified gold by the British Phonographic Industry (BPI) for shipments in excess of 100,000 copies. It is the band's only album to feature violinist Neil Amin-Smith, who left the band in 2016.

== Background and release ==
The album was named after Noailles, a neighbourhood of Marseille in France where band members Jack Patterson and Grace Chatto regularly visit on holiday.

== Singles ==
The album's lead single, "A+E", was released on 7 December 2012 and features vocals from Kandaka Moore and Nikki Cislyn. It was their first appearance on the UK Singles Chart, peaking at number 100. "Mozart's House" was re-released on 29 March 2013 as the album's second single. The track includes part of the String Quartet No. 21 by Wolfgang Amadeus Mozart. The third single, "Dust Clears", was released on 19 July 2013, featuring vocals from Noonie Bao.

"Rather Be", featuring vocals from Jess Glynne, was released on 17 January 2014 as the album's fourth single and spent four weeks at number one in the UK, selling over 1.1 million copies since release. The album's fifth single, "Extraordinary", features vocals from Sharna Bass and was released on 16 May 2014. The album's sixth single, released on 8 August 2014 after the album's release, was "Come Over" and features vocals from Stylo G.

A seventh single, titled "Real Love", was released on 16 November 2014 as part of the special edition re-release of New Eyes. It is a joint single with Jess Glynne.

The album's eighth and final single, "Stronger", features uncredited vocals by Alex Newell and Sean Bass and was released on 13 February 2015. It was originally released on 22 November 2014, featuring uncredited vocals from Olly Alexander, the lead singer of Years & Years. The new version of the song was included on the second re-release of New Eyes in 2015.

== Critical reception ==
Professional ratings
Aggregate scores
| Source | Rating |
|---|---|
| Metacritic | 59/100 |
Review scores
| Source | Rating |
| AllMusic | 3/5 stars |
| Clash | 3/10 |
| Digital Spy | 4/5 stars |
| The Guardian | 2/5 stars |
| Mixmag | 3/5 |
| musicOMH | 4/5 stars |
| NME | 5/10 |
| The Observer | 3/5 stars |
| Q | 4/5 stars |
| Time Out London | 4/5 stars |

Upon release, New Eyes received mixed reviews from music critics. According to Metacritic, the album received an average score of 59/100 based on 11 reviews. Lewis Corner for Digital Spy gave the album 4 out of 5 stars and praised the album, commenting that Clean Bandit have "delivered a shimmering debut that follows the cardinal rules of pop: great melodies, simple messages and plenty of hooks". The Guardian writer Alexis Petridis gave the album 2 out of 5 stars commented, "They think they can save dance music but have no hooks, songs or lyrics – just dodgy string arrangements". He also noted that the album might have worked better as an instrumental album, partly due to its "uniformly awful" lyrics and that the group could be "capable of making a far more interesting album".

Joe Zadeh for Clash magazine gave the album a 3 out of 10 and described the classical elements of the album as "independently pleasing" but also commented that its "magpie production makes for a mess of a debut album". Kate Mossoman of The Observer gave the album 3 out of 5 stars and noted that "New Eyes is proof that you can get away with pretty much anything as long as you're clever about it. Even in its more ordinary moments, it's still a classical gas." Nick Levine of Time Out London gave the album 4 out of 5 stars and described it as "classy" sounding and also "warm, inviting and frequently very catchy".

== Track listing ==
New Eyes – Standard edition
| No. | Title | Writer(s) | Producer(s) | Length |
|---|---|---|---|---|
| 1. | "Mozart's House" (featuring Love Ssega) | Jack Patterson; Grace Chatto; Ssegawa-Ssekintu Kiwanuka; Eliza Shaddad | Patterson | 3:50 |
| 2. | "Extraordinary" (featuring Sharna Bass) | Patterson; Chatto; James Napier; Gustave Rudman | Patterson; Grace Chatto; Mark Ralph^{[a]} | 4:17 |
| 3. | "Dust Clears" (featuring Noonie Bao) | Patterson; Chatto; Napier | Patterson | 4:27 |
| 4. | "Rather Be" (featuring Jess Glynne) | Patterson; Chatto; Napier; Nicole Marshall | Patterson; Chatto | 3:48 |
| 5. | "A+E" (featuring Kandaka Moore and Nikki Cislyn) | Patterson; Chatto; Marshall | Patterson | 4:07 |
| 6. | "Come Over" (featuring Stylo G) | Patterson; Chatto; Jason Andre McDermott | Patterson; Ralph^{[a]} | 3:43 |
| 7. | "Cologne" (featuring Nikki Cislyn and Javeon) | Patterson; Chatto; Marshall; Uzoechi Emenike | Patterson; Ralph^{[a]} | 4:06 |
| 8. | "Telephone Banking" (featuring Love Ssega) | Patterson; Chatto; Kiwanuka | Patterson | 3:51 |
| 9. | "Up Again" (featuring Rae Morris) | Patterson; Chatto; Rachel Morris | Patterson; Ralph^{[a]}; Andy Gangadeen^{[b]}; Nick Cohen^{[b]} | 4:21 |
| 10. | "Heart on Fire" (featuring Elisabeth Troy) | Patterson; Chatto; Yukara Weekes; Elisabeth Troy Antwi | Patterson; Ralph^{[a]} | 4:02 |
| 11. | "New Eyes" (featuring Lizzo) | Patterson; Chatto; Melissa Viviane Jefferson | Patterson; Ralph^{[a]} | 3:46 |
| 12. | "Birch" (featuring Eliza Shaddad) | Patterson; Chatto; Neil Amin-Smith; Shaddad | Patterson | 4:16 |
| 13. | "Outro Movement III" | Patterson; Chatto | Patterson | 2:01 |
| Total length: | | | | 50:28 |

New Eyes – Deluxe edition (bonus tracks)
| No. | Title | Writer(s) | Producer(s) | Length |
|---|---|---|---|---|
| 14. | "Rihanna" (featuring Noonie Bao) | Patterson; Chatto; Jonnali Parmenius | Patterson | 3:14 |
| 15. | "UK Shanty" (featuring Eliza Shaddad) | Patterson; Chatto; Shaddad | Patterson | 3:37 |
| 16. | "Nightingale" (featuring Nikki Cislyn) | Patterson; Chatto; Marshall | Patterson | 2:45 |
| 17. | "Nightingale" (Gorgon City Remix) | Patterson; Chatto; Marshall | | 5:45 |
| 18. | "Rather Be" (featuring Jess Glynne) (The Magician Remix) | Patterson; Chatto; Napier; Marshall | | 4:35 |
| Total length: | | | | 70:18 |

New Eyes – Deluxe edition (DVD)
| No. | Title | Producer(s) | Length |
|---|---|---|---|
| 1. | "Mozart's House" | Patterson |
| 2. | "Telephone Banking" (featuring Love Ssega) | Patterson; Chatto |
| 3. | "UK Shanty" (featuring Eliza Shaddad) | Patterson |
| 4. | "A+E" (featuring Kandaka Moore) | Patterson |
| 5. | "Nightingale" (featuring Nikki Cislyn) | Patterson |
| 6. | "Dust Clears" (featuring Noonie Bao) | Patterson |
| 7. | "Rather Be" (featuring Jess Glynne) | Patterson |

New Eyes – Japanese version (bonus tracks)
| No. | Title | Writer(s) | Length |
|---|---|---|---|
| 14. | "Extraordinary" (Bontan Remix) (featuring Sharna Bass) | Patterson; Chatto; Napier; Rudman |
| 15. | "Rather Be" (All About She Remix) (featuring Jess Glynne) | Patterson; Chatto; Napier; Marshall |
| 16. | "Dust Clears" (Russ Chimes Remix) (featuring Noonie Bao) | Patterson; Chatto; Napier |

=== Special edition ===
New Eyes – Special edition (bonus tracks)
| No. | Title | Writer(s) | Producer(s) | Length |
|---|---|---|---|---|
| 14. | "Real Love" (with Jess Glynne) | Patterson; Chatto; Richard Boardman; Robert Harvey; Cleo Tighe; Sarah Blanchard; Jessica Glynne; Janee Bennett | Patterson; Chatto; Starsmith^{[b]}; Wez Clarke^{[b]}; The Six^{[c]} | 3:39 |
| 15. | "Stronger" | Patterson; Chatto; Oliver Thornton; George Moore | Patterson; Clarke^{[b]} | 3:42 |
| 16. | "Show Me Love" (featuring Elisabeth Troy) | Allan George; Fred McFarlane | Patterson | 3:26 |
| 17. | "Up Again" (featuring Rae Morris) (Drumsound and Bassline Smith Remix) | Patterson; Chatto; Morris | | 3:28 |

New Eyes – Special edition (DVD)
| No. | Title | Length |
|---|---|---|
| 1. | "Outro Movement III" (featuring BBC Philharmonic Orchestra) | 3:32 |
| 2. | "Dust Clears" (featuring BBC Philharmonic Orchestra) | 3:37 |
| 3. | "Extraordinary" (featuring BBC Philharmonic Orchestra and Rae Morris) | 2:40 |
| 4. | "Up Again" (featuring BBC Philharmonic Orchestra and Rae Morris) | 4:31 |
| 5. | "A+E" (featuring BBC Philharmonic Orchestra and Nikki Cislyn) | 3:12 |
| 6. | "Birch" (featuring BBC Philharmonic Orchestra and Eliza Shaddad) | 4:18 |
| 7. | "UK Shanty" (featuring BBC Philharmonic Orchestra and Eliza Shaddad) | 3:48 |
| 8. | "Telephone Banking" (featuring BBC Philharmonic Orchestra and Love Ssega) | 4:09 |
| 9. | "New Eyes" (featuring BBC Philharmonic Orchestra) | 1:49 |
| 10. | "Rihanna" (featuring BBC Philharmonic Orchestra and Rae Morris) | 2:22 |
| 11. | "Nightingale" (featuring BBC Philharmonic Orchestra, Nikki Cislyn and Eliza Shaddad) | 5:10 |
| 12. | "Rather Be" (featuring BBC Philharmonic Orchestra and Jess Glynne) | 4:15 |

=== 2015 re-release ===
New Eyes – 2015 re-release
| No. | Title | Writer(s) | Producer(s) | Length |
|---|---|---|---|---|
| 1. | "Stronger" | Patterson; Chatto; Thornton; Moore | Patterson; Clarke^{[b]} | 3:39 |
| 2. | "Mozart's House" (featuring Love Ssega) | Patterson; Chatto; Kiwanuka | Patterson | 3:50 |
| 3. | "Extraordinary" (featuring Sharna Bass) | Patterson; Chatto; Napier; Rudman | Patterson; Chatto; Ralph^{[a]} | 4:16 |
| 4. | "Dust Clears" (featuring Noonie Bao) | Patterson; Chatto; Napier | Patterson | 4:26 |
| 5. | "Rather Be" (featuring Jess Glynne) | Patterson; Chatto; Napier; Marshall | Patterson; Chatto | 3:47 |
| 6. | "A+E" (featuring Kandaka Moore and Nikki Cislyn) | Patterson; Chatto | Patterson | 4:06 |
| 7. | "Come Over" (featuring Stylo G) | Patterson; Chatto; McDermott | Patterson; Ralph^{[a]} | 3:43 |
| 8. | "Real Love" (with Jess Glynne) | Patterson; Chatto; Boardman; Harvey; Tighe; Blanchard; Glynne; Bennett | Patterson; Chatto; Starsmith^{[b]}; Clarke^{[b]}; The Six^{[c]} | 3:39 |
| 9. | "Cologne" (featuring Nikki Cislyn and Javeon) | Patterson; Chatto; Marshall; Emenike | Patterson; Ralph^{[a]} | 4:05 |
| 10. | "Telephone Banking" (featuring Love Ssega) | Patterson; Chatto; Kiwanuka | Patterson | 3:50 |
| 11. | "Up Again" (featuring Rae Morris) | Patterson; Chatto; Morris | Patterson; Ralph^{[a]}; Gangadeen^{[b]}; Cohen^{[b]} | 4:20 |
| 12. | "Heart on Fire" (featuring Elisabeth Troy) | Patterson; Chatto; Weekes; Antwi | Patterson; Ralph^{[a]} | 4:02 |
| 13. | "New Eyes" (featuring Lizzo) | Patterson; Chatto; Jefferson | Patterson; Ralph^{[a]} | 3:46 |
| 14. | "Birch" (featuring Eliza Shaddad) | Patterson; Chatto; Amin-Smith; Shaddad | Patterson | 4:15 |
| 15. | "Outro Movement III" | Patterson; Chatto | Patterson | 2:00 |
| Total length: | | | | 57:53 |

== Personnel ==
Credits adapted from the liner notes of New Eyes.

- Noonie Bao – vocals
- Sharna Bass – vocals
- Grace Chatto – cello, producer, backing vocals, vocals
- Nikki Cislyn – vocals
- Wez Clarke – mixing, programming
- Steve Dub – mixing
- Stylo G – vocals
- Jess Glynne – vocals
- Jake Gordon – engineer
- Lewis Hopkin – mastering
- Javeon – vocals
- Matt de Jong – art direction, design
- Lizzo – vocals
- Matt Maguire – viola
- Kandaka Moore – vocals
- Benedict Morgan – photography
- Rae Morris – vocals
- Jimmy Napes – vocals
- Liam Nolan – engineer
- Jack Patterson – producer, mixing, keyboards, piano, vocals, art direction, bass, body percussion, Sega Gamegear, steel drums
- Luke Patterson – drums
- Beatrice Philips – violin
- Mark Ralph – co-producer, mixing
- Florence Rawlings – backing vocals
- Eliza Shaddad – vocals
- Brett Shaw – engineer
- Neil Amin-Smith – violin
- Love Ssega – vocals
- Anthony Strong – piano
- Elisabeth Troy – vocals
- Ian Watt – management
- John Webber – mastering
- Alistair White – management
- Asher Zaccardelli – viola

== Charts ==
=== Weekly charts ===
| Chart (2014) | Peak position |
|---|---|
| Australian Dance Albums (ARIA) | 17 |
| Australian Hitseekers Albums (ARIA) | 2 |
| Austrian Albums (Ö3 Austria) | 67 |
| Belgian Albums (Ultratop Flanders) | 39 |
| Belgian Albums (Ultratop Wallonia) | 35 |
| Dutch Albums (Album Top 100) | 22 |
| French Albums (SNEP) | 52 |
| German Albums (Offizielle Top 100) | 31 |
| Hungarian Albums (MAHASZ) | 7 |
| Irish Albums (IRMA) | 9 |
| Italian Albums (FIMI) | 57 |
| Japanese Albums (Oricon) | 45 |
| New Zealand Albums (RMNZ) | 30 |
| Scottish Albums (OCC) | 10 |
| Spanish Albums (Promusicae) | 72 |
| Swiss Albums (Schweizer Hitparade) | 8 |
| UK Albums (OCC) | 3 |
| UK Dance Albums (OCC) | 1 |
| US Billboard 200 | 180 |
| US Top Dance Albums (Billboard) | 6 |

=== Year-end charts ===
| Chart (2014) | Position |
|---|---|
| UK Albums (OCC) | 62 |

| Chart (2015) | Position |
|---|---|
| UK Albums (OCC) | 86 |

== Certifications ==
| Region | Certification | Certified units/sales |
|---|---|---|
| New Zealand (RMNZ) | Platinum | 15,000^{‡} |
| Poland (ZPAV) | Gold | 10,000^{‡} |
| Sweden (GLF) | Gold | 20,000^{‡} |
| United Kingdom (BPI) | Gold | 239,342 |
| United States (RIAA) | Gold | 500,000^{‡} |
^{‡} Sales+streaming figures based on certification alone.

== Release history ==
| Region | Date | Format(s) | Edition(s) | Label | Ref. |
|---|---|---|---|---|---|
| Germany | 30 May 2014 | CD; digital download | Standard; deluxe | Warner | |
| Ireland | 30 May 2014 | CD; CD+DVD; digital download | Standard; deluxe | Atlantic | |
| France | 2 June 2014 | CD; digital download | Standard; deluxe | Warner | |
| United Kingdom | 2 June 2014 | CD; CD+DVD; digital download | Standard; deluxe | Atlantic | |
| Italy | 3 June 2014 | Digital download | Standard; deluxe | Warner | |
| Spain | 3 June 2014 | Digital download | Standard; deluxe | Warner | |
| Japan | 11 June 2014 | CD; digital download | Standard; deluxe | Warner | |
| Canada | 17 June 2014 | CD; digital download | Standard | Warner | |
| United States | 17 June 2014 | CD; digital download | Standard | Atlantic | |
| United Kingdom | 24 November 2014 | Double CD; digital download | Special | Atlantic | |
