= Mozart's House =

2013 single by Clean Bandit

Single by Clean Bandit featuring Love Ssega

from the album New Eyes
- B-side: "UK Shanty"
- Released: 15 October 2010 (video release); 29 March 2013 (re-release)
- Recorded: 2010
- Genre: Electronic; classical crossover
- Length: 3:51
- Label: Self-released (original); Black Butter (re-released)
- Songwriters: Jack Patterson; Grace Chatto; Ssegawa-Ssekintu Kiwanuka; Eliza Shaddad
- Producer: Jack Patterson

Clean Bandit featuring Love Ssega singles chronology
"Mozart's House" (2010)	"Telephone Banking" (2012)

Clean Bandit singles chronology
"A+E" (2012)	"Mozart's House (re-release)" (2013)	"Intentions" (2013)

Music video
- "Mozart's House" on YouTube

"Mozart's House" is a song by the English electronic music group Clean Bandit. It was first released on 15 October 2010 on YouTube and later on 29 March 2013 as the second single from their first studio album, New Eyes (2014). The song peaked at number 17 on the UK Singles Chart. It includes part of the String Quartet No. 21 by Wolfgang Amadeus Mozart.

== Music video ==
A music video to accompany the release of "Mozart's House" was first released onto YouTube on 15 October 2010 at a total length of four minutes and four seconds. It has clips of the vocalist Ssegawa Ssekintu singing in various locations, along with a clip of the cellist Grace Chatto in her underwear, holding a violin across her chest. Chatto held a position teaching cello at a school when the release took place, and her appearance half naked caused her to be fired, following the complaint by a parent signaling this was indecent.

The video was filmed predominantly in Moscow, Russia, with some scenes filmed in London near Docklands Light Railway stations. Long sections of the video were filmed in slow motion then sped up to synchronise with normal speed.

== Track listing ==
Digital single (2011)
No.	Title	Writer(s)	Length
1.	"Mozart's House"	Jack Patterson; Grace Chatto; Ssegawa-Ssekintu Kiwanuka	3:51

Digital EP (2013)
No.	Title	Writer(s)	Length
1.	"Mozart's House"	Jack Patterson; Grace Chatto; Ssegawa-Ssekintu Kiwanuka	3:51
2.	"Mozart's House" (XXXY Remix)		4:16
3.	"Mozart's House" (My Nu Leng Remix)		4:30
4.	"UK Shanty"	Jack Patterson; Grace Chatto; Eliza Shaddad	3:37
Total length:			16:14

== Charts ==
Chart (2013)	Peak position
Scotland Singles (Official Charts)	17
UK Singles (Official Charts)	17
UK Dance (Official Charts)	5

== Release history ==
Region	Date	Format	Label
United Kingdom	19 December 2011	Digital single	Incredible Industries
United Kingdom	29 March 2013	Digital EP	Warner
