= Jack Patterson (songwriter) =

British musician

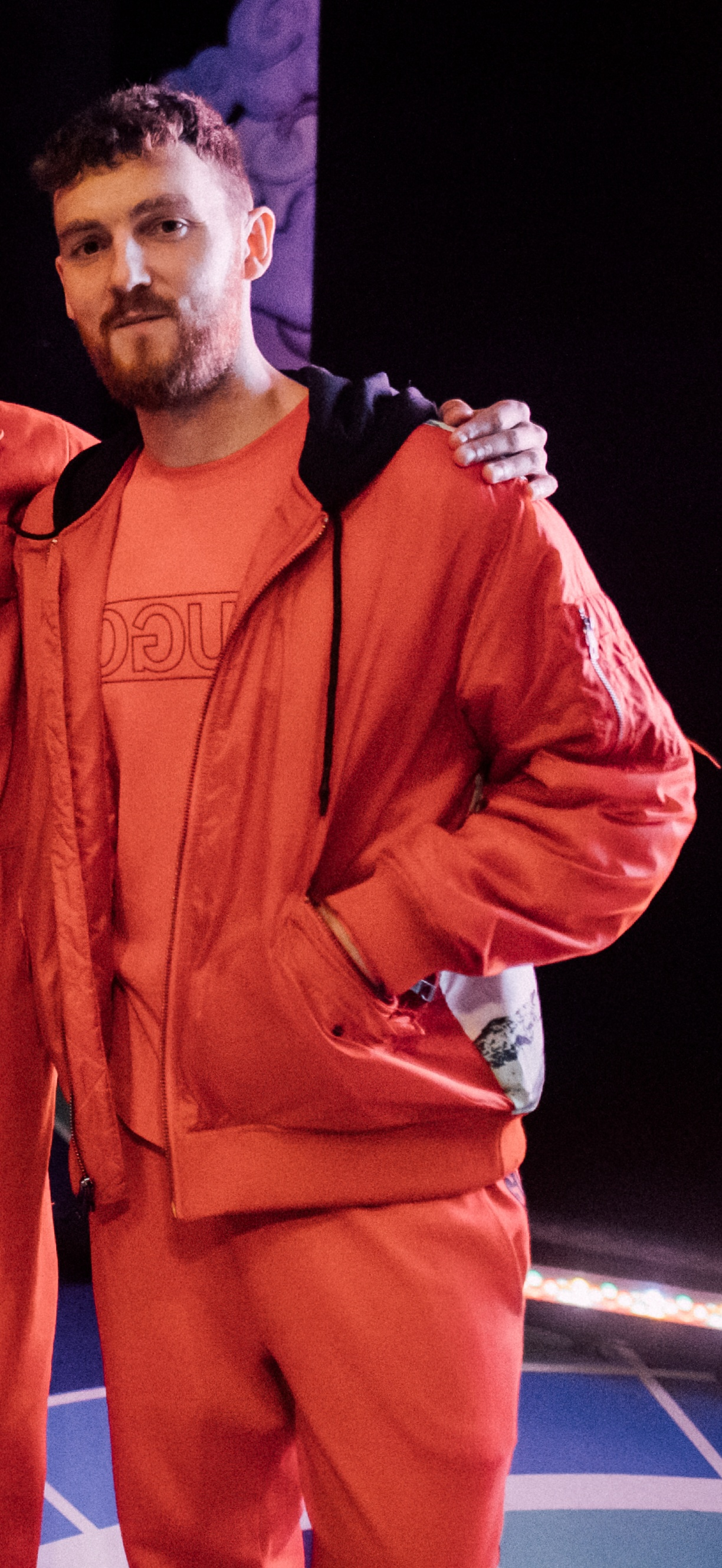
- Patterson in 2019

Background information
- Also known as: Wandeck
- Born: Jack Robert Patterson; 6 June 1986 (age 40); Birkenhead, England
- Origin: South Kilburn, England
- Genres: Pop; electropop; dance-pop
- Occupations: Musician; producer; songwriter; director
- Instruments: Keyboards; bass; guitar; saxophone; vocals
- Years active: 2008–present
- Label: CB X
- Member of: Clean Bandit

Jack Robert Patterson (born 6 June 1986) is a British musician, songwriter, producer and director who co-founded the electronic music group Clean Bandit. He produced and wrote all four of their number-one singles on the UK Official Singles Chart — "Rather Be" (featuring Jess Glynne), "Symphony" (featuring Zara Larsson), "Rockabye" (featuring Sean Paul and Anne-Marie), and "Solo" (featuring Demi Lovato).

Besides his work with Clean Bandit, Patterson has also co-written songs for other artists, including Jess Glynne's "Hold My Hand" (2015), and Shawn Mendes and Camila Cabello's "Señorita" (2019), both of which also reached number one on the chart.

== Early life ==
Patterson was born in Birkenhead, United Kingdom. He has a younger brother Luke, who is also in Clean Bandit. He attended Calday Grange Grammar School and went on to study architecture at Jesus College, Cambridge.

== Career ==
He co-founded Clean Bandit with fellow Jesus College, Cambridge undergraduate Grace Chatto in 2008, with his brother Luke Patterson joining as the drummer, Neil Amin-Smith as violinist and Love Ssega (Ssegamic) as the singer. The group's early line-up also included fellow Cambridge undergraduates violinist Lydia Scadding and Shiry Rashkovsky.

Patterson co-wrote and produced all of Clean Bandit's songs, and directed most of their music videos. Clean Bandit have received 8 Brit Award nominations, a VMA nomination, and won a Grammy for their song "Rather Be". They have released two studio albums.

Patterson has also written and produced songs for other artists, including Sean Paul, Camila Cabello, Shawn Mendes, Marina Diamandis, Becky Hill, Jess Glynne and Ellie Goulding. He has won two Ivor Novello awards.

== Personal life ==
Patterson split from his longtime girlfriend, singer Marina Diamandis, in 2021.

== Discography ==
=== Clean Bandit ===
- New Eyes (2014)
- What is Love? (2018)

=== Songwriting credits ===
Songs written or co-written by Jack Patterson
Year	Title	Album	Performer(s)
2015	Hold My Hand	I Cry When I Laugh	Jess Glynne
2018	Mad Love	Mad Love the Prequel (EP)	Sean Paul and David Guetta, featuring Becky G
2019	Señorita	Shawn Mendes (Deluxe version) and Romance	Shawn Mendes and Camila Cabello
2019	Karma	Love + Fear	Marina
2019	You	Love + Fear	Marina
2019	Lead Me On	Heavy Love	Louise
2023	Better Man	Higher Than Heaven (Deluxe edition)	Ellie Goulding
2024	True Colours	Believe Me Now?	Becky Hill featuring Self Esteem
2024	Easy	JESS	Jess Glynne
2026	Before You Know It	Non-album single	Kygo and Ava Max

== See also ==
- Clean Bandit
