= Grace Chatto =

English musician and singer

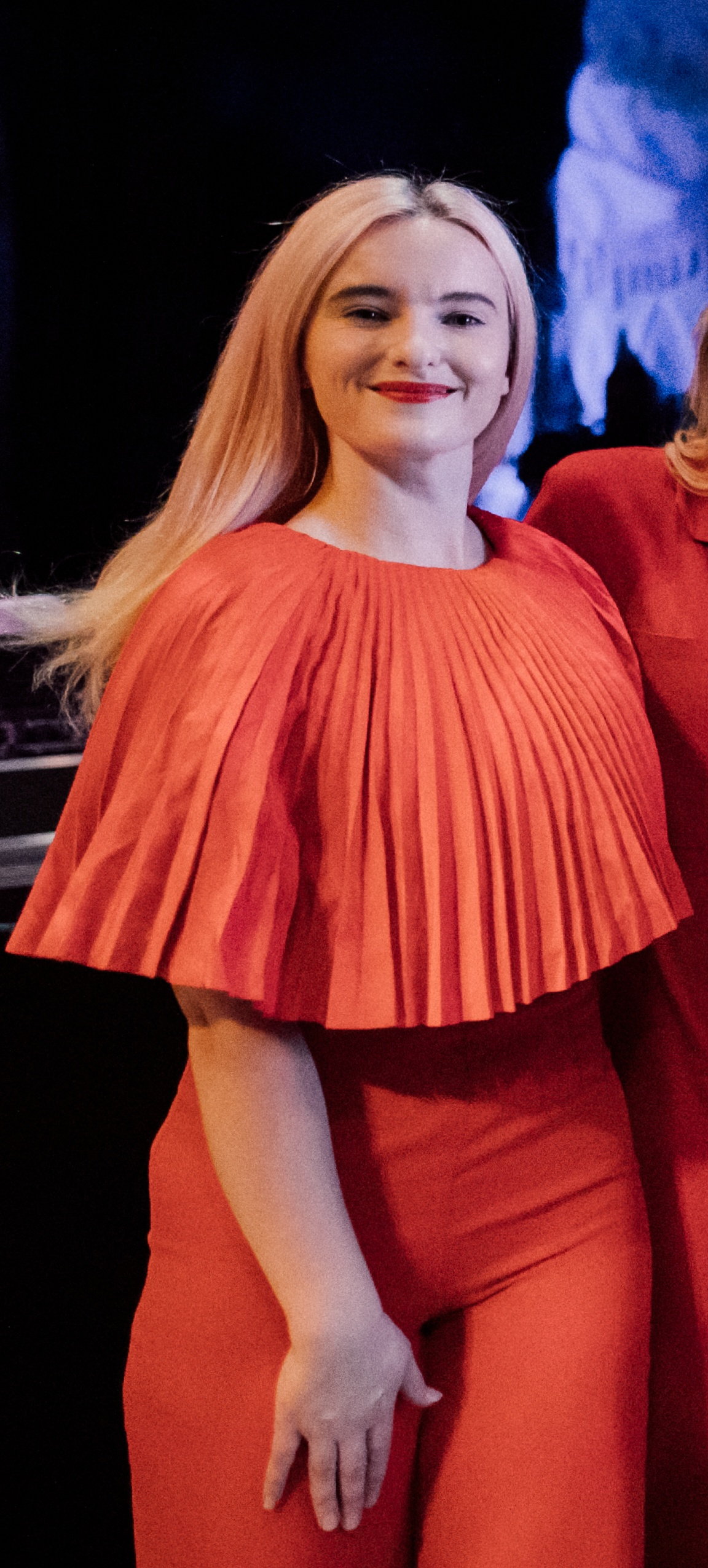
- Chatto in 2019

Background information
- Born: North London, England
- Genres: Pop; electropop; dance-pop
- Occupations: Musician; singer
- Instruments: Cello; violin; keyboards; percussion; vocals
- Years active: 1997–present
- Member of: Clean Bandit; Massive Violins

Grace Chatto is an English musician and co-founder of electronic music bands Clean Bandit and Massive Violins.

== Early life ==
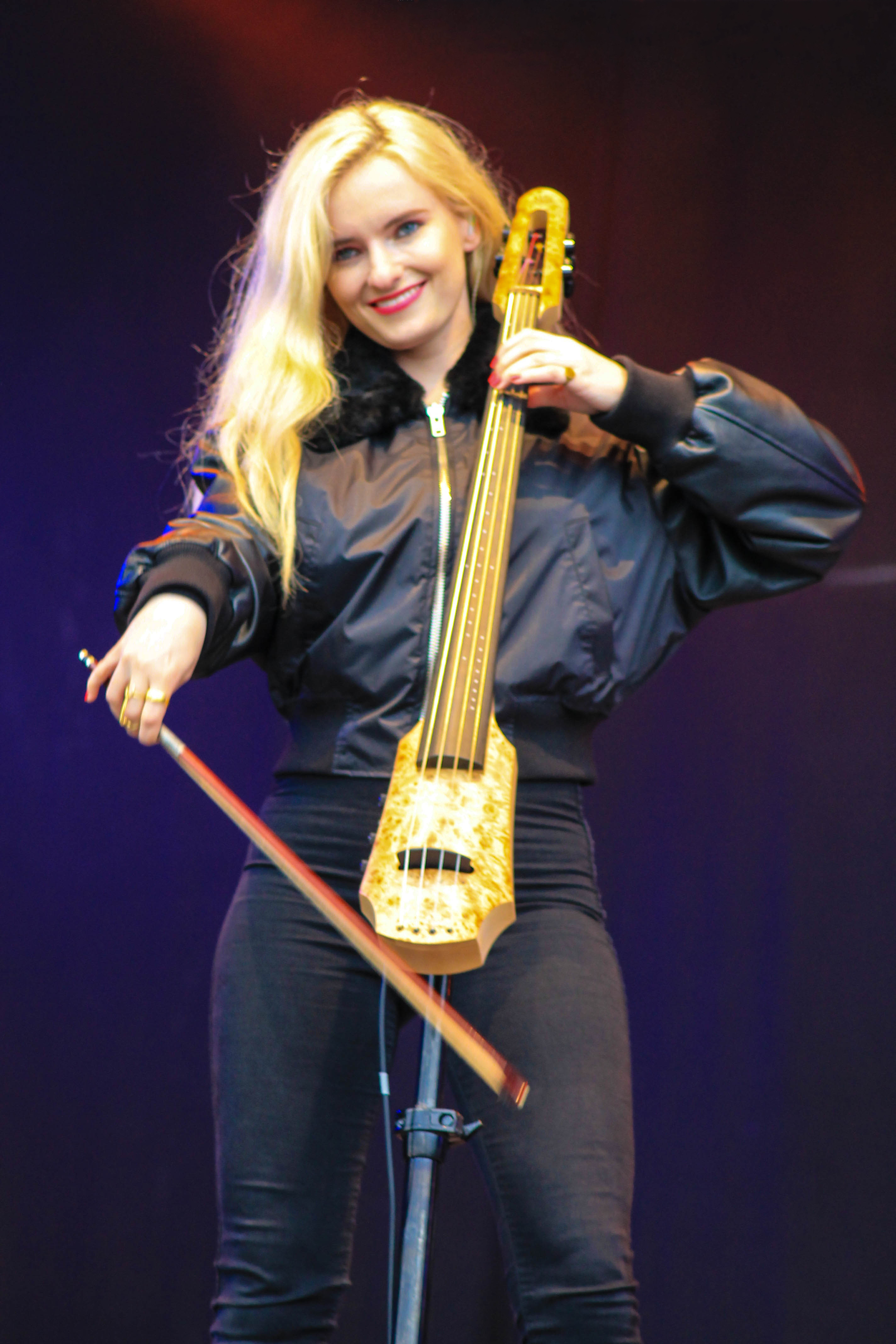
Chatto in 2014

Chatto was born in North London and grew up in Crouch End, later relocating to Shoreditch. She attended Latymer School and Westminster School, as well as the Royal Academy of Music. She studied Modern Languages at Jesus College, Cambridge.

== Career ==
Grace Chatto and Jack Patterson met while studying as undergraduates at Jesus College, Cambridge. Patterson was interested in Chatto’s classical string quartet, The Chatto Quartet, led at the time by violinist Neil Amin-Smith, and began making samples using recordings of the string quartet’s concerts. Patterson then enlisted his younger brother Luke Patterson on the drums. Grace and Jack’s friend Ssegawa-Ssekintu Kiwanuka (also known as Love Ssega) joined as the original vocalist, but later left to undertake a PhD in laser analytics. Love Ssega later appeared on Clean Bandit song "Telephone Banking" from their debut album New Eyes. Chatto also contributed vocals on the song "Come Over" featuring Stylo G.

The band's name, Clean Bandit, comes from a translation of a Russian phrase from Chatto's friend, Maria Lisogorskaya; the meaning is similar to the English phrase "complete bastard", though Patterson later stated that it is actually a more affectionate term similar to "utter rascal".

== Awards and achievements ==
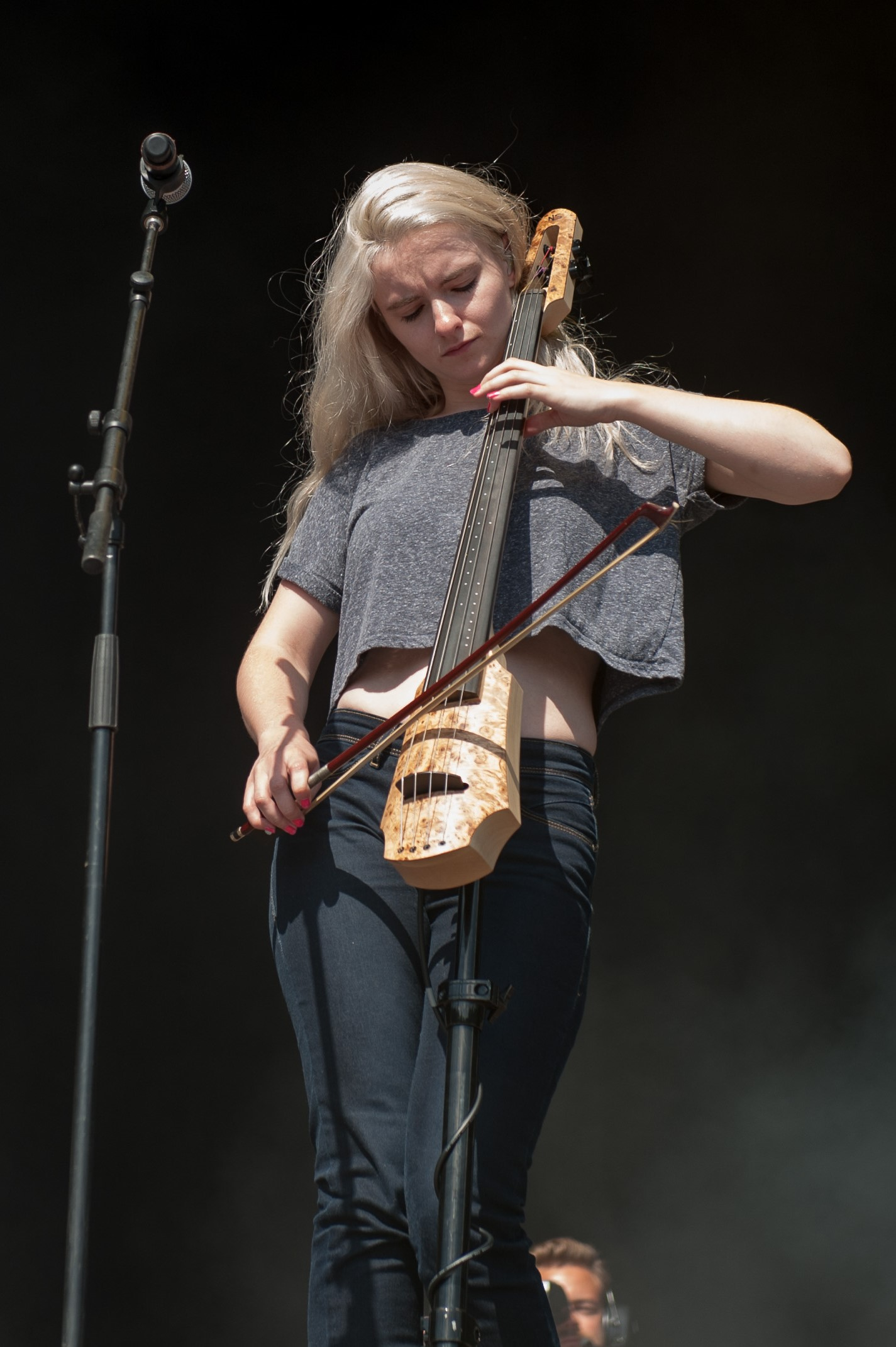
Grace Chatto at Way Out West, Sweden (2014)

Clean Bandit's 2010 single "Mozart's House" reached number 17 on the UK Singles Chart when re-released in 2013. In January 2014, they scored their first UK chart topping single with "Rather Be", a collaboration with Jess Glynne, featuring elements of both classical and dance music. The song also reached number 10 on the US Billboard Hot 100.

Together with the other members of Clean Bandit, Jack Patterson and Luke Patterson, she has won a Grammy Award for Best Dance Recording in 2015 for the track "Rather Be" and was nominated for two Brit Awards in 2015 and 2017.

Chatto directed the video for Clean Bandit's 2016 single "Rockabye", which features rapper Sean Paul and singer Anne-Marie, and became their second number-one hit in the UK, becoming the Christmas number one single for 2016 in its seventh consecutive week at number-one. Chatto also directed the video for Clean Bandit's single Symphony in March 2017, which contained an entire orchestra, with Clean Bandit members playing among them with Zara Larsson on lead vocals.

== Other projects ==
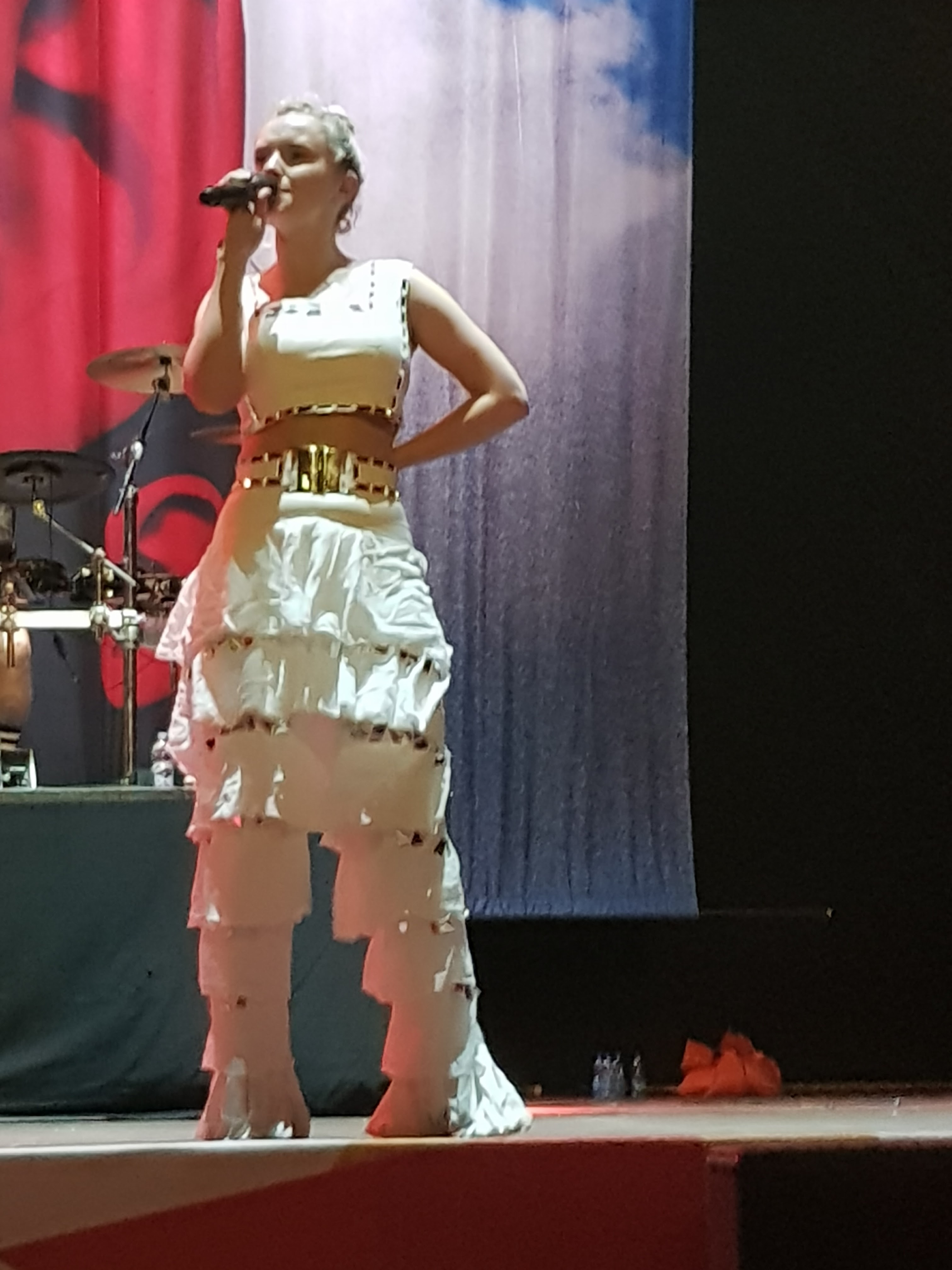
Grace Chatto with Clean Bandit in concert at Rome, Italy on 28 June 2017.

Chatto and Jack Patterson formed their own film production company, Cleanfilm, to make music videos for themselves and other artists. Chatto has produced and directed videos with Jack Patterson since the band's inception.

Chatto, with her father Ricky, formed a band of singing cellists called the Massive Violins, with whom she still performs.

On 10 November 2014, Chatto, along with Neil Amin-Smith was part of Band Aid 30 and featured on "Do They Know It's Christmas?" charity single to raise money towards the Ebola crisis in Western Africa.

On 13 November 2020, Chatto was featured on "Stop Crying Your Heart Out" as part of the BBC Radio 2's Allstars' Children in Need charity single. The single debuted at number 7 on the Official UK Singles Chart and number 1 on both the Official UK Singles Sales Chart and the Official UK Singles Download Chart.

== Personal life ==
Chatto has a degree in Russian literature, language and history. She was previously in a romantic relationship with bandmate Jack Patterson, which ended in 2014.

=== Political views ===
Chatto endorsed the Labour Party and Jeremy Corbyn in the 2017 UK general election.

In 2018, she defended Clean Bandit's decision to perform in Israel, disagreeing with the call for artists to boycott performances in the country. She said: "I’m not really sure what they hope to achieve and the suggestion that playing in a country means you support the political or foreign policy of that country is ridiculous, especially if you’re not willing to play there but play in America or the UK. Me wanting to play in Israel is not me making a statement about what’s going on there." In 2023, Chatto was listed as a co-signatory of the open letter "Music for a Ceasefire", a campaign by Corbyn's Peace & Justice Project calling for an immediate ceasefire in Gaza.

In 2020, following Keir Starmer's victory in the Labour Party leadership election, Chatto said that she respected the newly elected party leader "hugely" and hoped that the party "retain some of the left-wing policies the public did actually love". However, in 2025, she stated that she no longer supported the party under Starmer's leadership: "I voted for Labour my whole life but, when Keir Starmer became the leader and with everything that’s happened since, I do not support the party at the moment."

== Discography ==
=== Charity singles ===
Year	Title	Peak chart positions	Certifications	Notes
Year	Title	UK	Certifications	Notes
2014	"Do They Know It's Christmas?" (as part of Band Aid 30)	1	BPI: Gold	To raise money for the Ebola crisis in Western Africa.
2020	"Stop Crying Your Heart Out" (as part of BBC Radio 2's Allstars)	7		To support BBC Children in Need's 2020 appeal.

== Filmography ==
Films
Year	Title	Role	Notes
1998	Hilary and Jackie	Teena	
