= Jess Glynne discography =

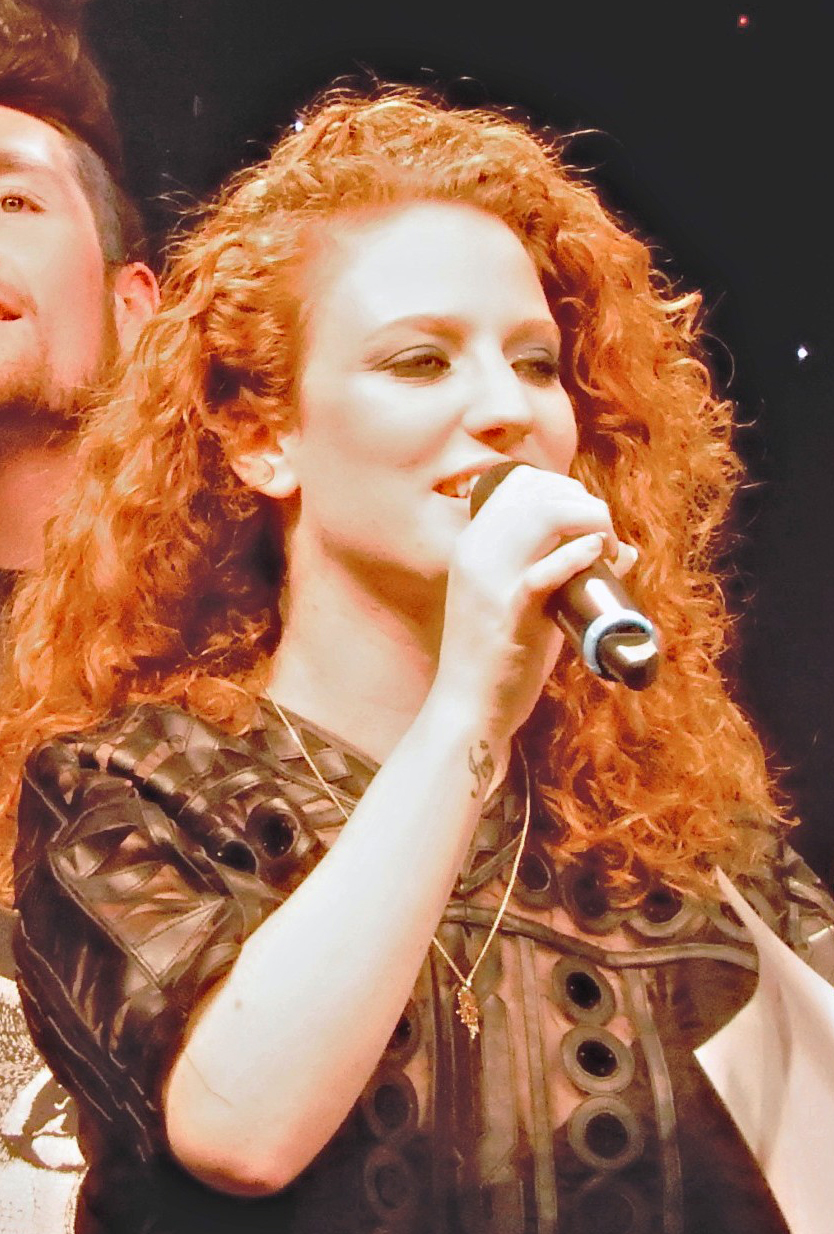
- Glynne performing at Shepherd's Bush Empire
- Studio albums: 3
- Singles: 20
- Music videos: 17

English singer Jess Glynne has released three studio albums, 20 singles (including six as a featured artist) and 17 music videos.

Glynne made her debut on Clean Bandit's single "Rather Be" in January 2014, which peaked at number one on the UK Singles Chart. The following month, she was featured on Route 94's single "My Love", which also topped the charts in the UK. Her debut solo single "Right Here" was released in July 2014 as the lead single from her debut album I Cry When I Laugh. The song peaked at number six in the UK. She again collaborated with Clean Bandit later that year on "Real Love". Further singles "Hold My Hand", "Don't Be So Hard on Yourself" and the Tinie Tempah track "Not Letting Go" also topped the UK charts, giving Glynne five number-one singles in the space of one year and making her the second British female solo artist to achieve the tally after Cheryl. The album charted atop the UK Albums Chart and has since been certified four times platinum by the British Phonographic Industry for sales exceeding 1,200,000 copies.

In January 2018, Glynne featured on the Rudimental-headed single "These Days" with Macklemore and Dan Caplen. With the single reaching number one in the UK, Glynne surpassed Cheryl to become the British female solo artist with the most chart-toppers in UK chart history. Glynne extended this lead further with the release of her second studio album's lead single "I'll Be There", which became her seventh number-one single, while additional singles "All I Am" and "Thursday" reached the top ten in the UK. Glynne released her second studio album Always In Between on 12 October 2018.

== Studio albums ==
List of studio albums, with selected chart positions and certifications
Title	Album details	Peak chart positions										Certifications
Title	Album details	UK	AUS	AUT	GER	IRE	ITA	NL	NZ	SWI	US	Certifications
I Cry When I Laugh	Released: 21 August 2015; Label: Atlantic; Formats: CD, digital download	1	7	46	27	3	10	6	36	12	25	BPI: 5× Platinum; FIMI: Gold; RIAA: Gold; RMNZ: Platinum
Always In Between	Released: 12 October 2018; Label: Atlantic; Formats: CD, digital download	1	18	58	33	4	31	40	16	32	109	BPI: 2× Platinum; RMNZ: Platinum
Jess	Released: 26 April 2024; Label: EMI; Formats: Digital download, streaming	6	—	—	—	—	—	—	—	—	—	
"—" denotes a recording that did not chart or was not released in that territory.

== Singles ==
=== As lead artist ===
List of singles as lead artist, with selected chart positions and certifications, showing year released and album name
Title	Year	Peak chart positions										Certifications	Album
Title	Year	UK	AUS	AUT	GER	IRE	ITA	NL	NZ	SWI	US	Certifications	Album
"Right Here"	2014	6	67	—	25	57	—	—	—	23	—	BPI: Platinum	I Cry When I Laugh
"Real Love" (Note: The single was featured as the lead single from the special edition of Clean Bandit's debut studio album New Eyes.) (with Clean Bandit)	2014	2	13	22	2	26	53	—	35	37	—	BPI: Platinum; ARIA: Platinum; FIMI: Gold; RMNZ: Gold	I Cry When I Laugh
"Hold My Hand"	2015	1	16	27	19	7	13	15	—	20	86	BPI: 3× Platinum; ARIA: Platinum; BVMI: Gold; FIMI: 2× Platinum; RIAA: Platinum; RMNZ: 2× Platinum	I Cry When I Laugh
"Don't Be So Hard on Yourself"	2015	1	10	65	46	13	47	—	— (Note: "Don't Be So Hard on Yourself" did not enter the New Zealand Singles Chart, but peaked at number four on the New Zealand Heatseekers chart.)	—	—	BPI: 3× Platinum; ARIA: Platinum; FIMI: Platinum; RMNZ: 2× Platinum	I Cry When I Laugh
"Take Me Home"	2015	6	98	—	66	10	5	100	—	52	—	BPI: 3× Platinum; FIMI: 3× Platinum; NVPI: Gold; RMNZ: Platinum	I Cry When I Laugh
"Ain't Got Far to Go"	2016	45	—	—	—	—	—	—	—	—	—	BPI: Silver	I Cry When I Laugh
"I'll Be There"	2018	1	23	—	92	8	—	—	28	66	—	BPI: 3× Platinum; ARIA: 3× Platinum; FIMI: Gold; RMNZ: 4× Platinum	Always In Between (Note: "One Touch" features on the digital version of Always In Between.)
"All I Am"	2018	7	92	—	—	10	78	60	— (Note: "All I Am" did not enter the NZ Top 40 Singles Chart, but peaked at number 19 on the NZ Hot Singles Chart.)	—	—	BPI: Platinum; ARIA: Platinum; FIMI: Gold; RMNZ: Gold	Always In Between
"Thursday"	2018	3	—	—	—	9	—	—	— (Note: "Thursday" did not enter the NZ Top 40 Singles Chart, but peaked at number 22 on the NZ Hot Singles Chart.)	—	—	BPI: 2× Platinum; RMNZ: Gold	Always In Between
"One Touch" (Note: "One Touch" also appears on Jax Jones' debut EP Snacks and debut album Snacks (Supersize).) (with Jax Jones)	2019	19	—	—	—	28	—	—	— (Note: "One Touch" did not enter the NZ Top 40 Singles Chart, but peaked at number 18 on the NZ Hot Singles Chart.)	88	—	BPI: Platinum; RMNZ: Gold	Always In Between
"This Christmas"	2020	3	—	—	—	—	72	—	—	—	—	BPI: Silver	Non-album single
"Silly Me"	2023	—	—	—	—	—	—	—	—	—	—		Jess
"What Do You Do?"	2023	—	—	—	—	—	—	—	—	—	—		Jess
"Friend of Mine"	2023	87	—	—	—	—	—	—	—	—	—		Jess
"Enough"	2024	—	—	—	—	—	—	—	—	—	—		Jess
"Easy"	2024	—	—	—	—	—	—	—	—	—	—		Jess
"Summer's Back" (with Alok)	2024	—	—	—	—	—	—	—	—	—	—		Non-album single
"Back to Me" (with Rudimental)	2025	42	—	—	—	—	—	—	— (Note: "Back to Me" did not enter the NZ Top 40 Singles Chart, but peaked at number 35 on the NZ Hot Singles Chart.)	—	—		Rudim3ntal
"—" denotes a recording that did not chart or was not released in that territory.

=== As featured artist ===
List of singles as featured artist, with selected chart positions and certifications, showing year released and album name
Title	Year	Peak chart positions										Certifications	Album
Title	Year	UK	AUS	AUT	GER	IRE	ITA	NL	NZ	SWI	US	Certifications	Album
"Rather Be" (Clean Bandit featuring Jess Glynne)	2014	1	2	1	1	1	2	1	2	2	10	BPI: 6× Platinum; ARIA: 6× Platinum; BVMI: 2× Platinum; FIMI: 4× Platinum; IFPI AUT: Gold; IFPI SWI: Platinum; NVPI: Platinum; RIAA: 4× Platinum; RMNZ: 6× Platinum	New Eyes
"My Love" (Route 94 featuring Jess Glynne)	2014	1	18	11	6	12	—	9	38	21	—	BPI: 3× Platinum; ARIA: Platinum; BVMI: Platinum; FIMI: Gold; RMNZ: 2× Platinum	Non-album single
"Not Letting Go" (Tinie Tempah featuring Jess Glynne)	2015	1	24	—	—	8	41	98	31	—	—	BPI: Platinum; ARIA: Gold; FIMI: Platinum; RMNZ: Platinum	Youth and I Cry When I Laugh (Deluxe)
"Kill the Lights" (Alex Newell, DJ Cassidy and Jess Glynne featuring Nile Rodgers)	2016	—	—	—	—	—	—	—	—	—	—	RIAA: Gold	Non-album singles
"I Can Feel It" (DJ Serge Wood featuring Jess Glynne)	2016	—	—	—	—	—	—	—	—	—	—		Non-album singles
"These Days" (Rudimental featuring Jess Glynne, Macklemore and Dan Caplen)	2018	1	2	1	3	2	4	10	4	2	— (Note: "These Days" did not enter the Billboard Hot 100, but peaked at number five on the Bubbling Under Hot 100 Singles chart.)	BPI: 5× Platinum; ARIA: 5× Platinum; BVMI: 3× Gold; FIMI: 3× Platinum; IFPI AUT: Platinum; RIAA: Platinum; RMNZ: 6× Platinum	Toast to Our Differences and Always In Between
"Mind on It" (Yungen featuring Jess Glynne)	2018	47	—	—	—	—	—	—	—	—	—		Non-album single
"So Real (Warriors)" (Too Many Zooz and KDA featuring Jess Glynne)	2018	—	—	—	—	—	—	—	—	—	—		Always In Between
"Times Like These" (as part of Live Lounge Allstars)	2020	1	—	—	—	64	—	—	—	—	—	BPI: Silver	Non-album singles
"Stop Crying Your Heart Out" (as BBC Radio 2's Allstars)	2020	7	—	—	—	—	—	—	—	—	—		Non-album singles
"Lie for You" (Snakehips featuring Jess Glynne, Davido and A Boogie wit da Hoodie)	2020	—	—	—	—	—	—	—	—	—	—		Non-album singles
"Wish U Well" (French Montana and Swae Lee featuring Lojay and Jess Glynne)	2023	—	—	—	—	—	—	—	—	—	—		Non-album singles
"Love Has Gone" (Alok and Alta, Robert Falcon featuring Jess Glynne)	2025	—	—	—	—	—	—	—	—	—	—		Non-album singles
"—" denotes a recording that did not chart or was not released in that territory.

=== Promotional singles ===
List of promotional singles, with selected chart positions, showing year released and album name
Title	Year	Peak chart positions			Certifications	Album
Title	Year	UK	FRA	NZ Hot	Certifications	Album
"If I Can't Have You"	2016	—	104	—		Saturday Night Fever: The Musical
"123"	2018	—	—	33		Always In Between
"No One"	2018	88	—	—	BPI: Silver	Always In Between
"—" denotes a recording that did not chart or was not released in that territory.

== Other charted and certified songs ==
List of songs, with selected chart positions and certifications, showing year released and album name
Title	Year	Peak chart positions		Certifications	Album
Title	Year	UK	NZ Hot	Certifications	Album
"Why Me"	2015	68	—		I Cry When I Laugh
"Gave Me Something"	2015	172	—		I Cry When I Laugh
"My Love" (acoustic)	2015	—	—	BPI: Silver	I Cry When I Laugh
"Broken"	2018	—	28		Always In Between
"Come Alive" (with Years & Years)	2018	80	—		The Greatest Showman: Reimagined
"—" denotes a recording that did not chart or was not released in that territory.

== Guest appearances ==
List of guest appearances, showing year released, other artists and album name
Title	Year	Other artist(s)	Album
"She Knows How to Love Me"	2018	David Guetta, Stefflon Don	7
"Come Alive"	2018	Years & Years	The Greatest Showman: Reimagined
"Dark Clouds"	2019	Rudimental, Chronixx	Toast to Our Differences
"Love Me Again" (Remix)	2019	Raye	Non-album remix

== Music videos ==
Title	Year	Director(s)	Other artist(s)
As lead artist
"Home"	2014	Jo'lene Henry	None
"Right Here"	2014	Ildikó Buckley and Jane Palmer	None
"Real Love"	2014	Jack Patterson	Clean Bandit
"Hold My Hand"	2015	Emil Nava	None
"Don't Be So Hard on Yourself"	2015	Declan Whitebloom	None
"Why Me"	2015	Jo'lene Henry	None
"Take Me Home"	2015	Declan Whitebloom	None
"Ain't Got Far to Go"	2016	Declan Whitebloom	None
"If I Can't Have You"	2016	Stéphane Jarny	None
"I'll Be There"	2018	Adriaan Louw	None
"All I Am"	2018	Declan Whitebloom	None
"Thursday"	2018	Joe Connor	None
"No One"	2019	Declan Whitebloom	None
"One Touch"	2019	Declan Whitebloom	Jax Jones
"Lie for You"	2020	Nicholas Lam	Snakehips, Davido, A Boogie wit da Hoodie
"This Christmas"	2020	Olivia Rose	None
As featured artist
Title	Year	Director(s)	Main artist(s)
"Rather Be"	2013	Jack Patterson	Clean Bandit
"My Love"	2014	Ryan Staake	Route 94
"Not Letting Go"	2015	Charlie Robins and Joe Alexander	Tinie Tempah
"These Days"	2018	Johnny Valencia	Rudimental, Macklemore, Dan Caplen
"Mind on It"	2018	Oliver Jennings	Yungen

== Songwriting credits ==
List of songs written or co-written by Glynne for other artists, showing year released and album name
Title	Year	Artist(s)	Album
"For a Minute"	2014	M.O	Non-album single
"Rumour Mill"	2015	Rudimental featuring Anne-Marie and Will Heard	We the Generation
"Grown"	2015	Little Mix	Get Weird
"I Won't"	2015	Little Mix	Get Weird
"All the Way Down"	2015	Kelela	Hallucinogen
"Lullaby"	2018	Sigala and Paloma Faith	Brighter Days
"Woman Like Me"	2018	Little Mix featuring Nicki Minaj	LM5
"Before You Know It"	2026	Kygo and Ava Max	Non-album single
