= Brit Awards 2016 =

British music awards ceremony

- Date: 24 February 2016
- Venue: The O2 Arena
- Hosted by: Ant & Dec

Highlights
- Most awards: Adele (4)
- Most nominations: Adele, James Bay and Years & Years (4)
- Website: https://www.brits.co.uk/

Television/radio coverage
- Network: ITV; YouTube

Brit Awards 2016 was held on 24 February 2016 and was the 36th edition of the British Phonographic Industry's annual pop music awards. The awards ceremony was held at The O2 Arena in London and were presented by Ant & Dec. Award nominations were revealed on 14 January 2016. British fashion designer Pam Hogg has designed the trophies for this year's ceremony, styling the BRIT statue.

The ceremony included a tribute to late British music icon David Bowie featuring an introduction by Annie Lennox, a tribute speech by Gary Oldman and a performance by Lorde backed by Bowie's long-time backing group.

== Performances ==
=== The Brits Are Coming: Nominations Launch Party ===
Laura Whitmore hosted the launch at the ITV Studios in London on Thursday 14 January.

Artist	Song	UK Singles Chart reaction	UK Albums Chart reaction
Jess Glynne	"Don't Be So Hard on Yourself"	37 (–9)	I Cry When I Laugh – 7 (–3)
Years & Years	"Eyes Shut"	17 (+/–)	Communion – 22 (–11)
Jack Garratt	"Worry"	N/A	N/A
Birdy	"Keeping Your Head Up"	N/A	N/A

=== Main show Performances ===
Artist	Song	UK Singles Chart reaction	UK Albums Chart reaction
Coldplay	"Hymn for the Weekend"	10 (+7)	A Head Full of Dreams – 5 (+/–)
Justin Bieber; James Bay	"Love Yourself" "Sorry"	5 (+2); 9 (–1)	Purpose – 4 (–1)
Jess Glynne	"Ain't Got Far to Go" "Don't Be So Hard on Yourself" "Hold My Hand"	70 (re-entry); 61 (+1); 72 (re-entry)	I Cry When I Laugh – 6 (+/–)
James Bay	"Hold Back the River"	56 (+35)	Chaos and the Calm – 7 (+10)
Rihanna; SZA; Drake	"Consideration" "Work"	88 (debut); 2 (+1)	Anti – 9 (+/–)
Little Mix	"Black Magic"	60 (+10)	Get Weird – 8 (+/–)
David Bowie's band: Earl Slick; Gail Ann Dorsey; Gerry Leonard; Mike Garson; Catherine Russell; Sterling Campbell; Lorde	Tribute to David Bowie; Instrumental Medley: contains interpolations of the following "Space Oddity" "Rebel Rebel" "Let's Dance" "Ashes to Ashes" "Ziggy Stardust" "Fame" "Under Pressure" "Heroes"; With Lorde: "Life on Mars?"	N/A	Best of Bowie – 2 (+/–); Nothing Has Changed – 13 (–3); Blackstar – 14 (–7); Hunky Dory – 37 (–8); The Rise and Fall of Ziggy Stardust and the Spiders from Mars – 41 (–6); Aladdin Sane – 80 (–26)
The Weeknd	"The Hills"	31 (+9)	Beauty Behind the Madness – 18 (+1)
Adele	"When We Were Young"	13 (+10)	25 – 1 (+/–); 21 – 26 (+7); 19 – 55 (+13)

== Winners and nominees ==
The nominations were revealed on 14 January 2016.

British Album of the Year (presented by Mark Ronson)	British Producer of the Year
Adele – 25; Coldplay – A Head Full of Dreams; Florence and the Machine – How Big, How Blue, How Beautiful; James Bay – Chaos and the Calm; Jamie xx – In Colour	Charlie Andrew; Mark Ronson; Mike Crossey; Tom Dalgety
British Single of the Year (presented by Suki Waterhouse and Simon Le Bon)	British Video of the Year (presented by Alan Carr and Lianne La Havas)
Adele – "Hello"; Calvin Harris & Disciples – "How Deep Is Your Love"; Ed Sheeran & Rudimental - "Bloodstream"; Ellie Goulding – "Love Me like You Do"; James Bay – "Hold Back the River"; Jess Glynne – "Hold My Hand"; Little Mix – "Black Magic"; Olly Murs featuring Demi Lovato – "Up"; Philip George – "Wish You Were Mine"; Years & Years – "King"	One Direction – "Drag Me Down" _{1}; Adele – "Hello"; Ed Sheeran – "Photograph"; Jessie J – "Flashlight"; Little Mix – "Black Magic" Eliminated; Calvin Harris & Disciples – "How Deep Is Your Love"; Ellie Goulding – "Love Me like You Do"; Naughty Boy featuring Beyoncé & Arrow Benjamin – "Runnin' (Lose It All)"; Sam Smith – "Writing's on the Wall"; Years & Years – "King"
British Male Solo Artist (presented by Kylie Minogue)	British Female Solo Artist (presented by Louis Tomlinson and Liam Payne)
James Bay; Aphex Twin; Calvin Harris; Jamie xx; Mark Ronson	Adele; Amy Winehouse (Posthumous); Florence and the Machine; Jess Glynne; Laura Marling
British Group (presented by Simon Pegg)	British Breakthrough Act (presented by Nick Grimshaw and Cheryl)
Coldplay; Blur; Foals; One Direction; Years & Years	Catfish and the Bottlemen; James Bay; Jess Glynne; Wolf Alice; Years & Years
International Male Solo Artist (presented by Major Lazer)	International Female Solo Artist (presented by Fleur East and Craig David)
Justin Bieber; Drake; Father John Misty; Kendrick Lamar; The Weeknd	Björk; Ariana Grande; Courtney Barnett; Lana Del Rey; Meghan Trainor
International Group (presented by Jourdan Dunn and Henry Cavill)	Critics' Choice Award
Tame Impala; Alabama Shakes; Eagles of Death Metal; Major Lazer; U2	Jack Garratt; Frances; Izzy Bizu
Global Success Award (presented by Tim Peake)	Icon Award (presented by Annie Lennox)
Adele	David Bowie (collected by Gary Oldman)

^{1} Liam Payne and Louis Tomlinson accept this award for British Video of the Year.

== Multiple nominations and awards ==
Artists that received multiple nominations
Nominations	Artist
4 (3)	Adele
4 (3)	James Bay
4 (3)	Years & Years
3 (2)	Calvin Harris
3 (2)	Jess Glynne
2 (9)	Coldplay
2 (9)	Disciples
2 (9)	Ed Sheeran
2 (9)	Ellie Goulding
2 (9)	Florence and the Machine
2 (9)	Jamie xx
2 (9)	Little Mix
2 (9)	Mark Ronson
2 (9)	One Direction

Artists that received multiple awards
Awards	Artist
4	Adele

== Brit Awards 2016 album ==
Brit Awards 2016

Compilation album / Box set by Various Artists
- Released: 12 February 2016
- Label: UMTV

Various Artists chronology
Brit Awards 2015 (2015)	''Brit Awards 2016'' (2016)	Brit Awards 2017 (2017)

The Brit Awards 2016 is a compilation and box set which includes the "62 biggest tracks from the past year". The box set has three discs with a total of sixty-two songs by various artists.

=== Track listing ===
==== CD 1 ====
No.	Title	Artist(s)	Length
1.	"What Do You Mean?"	Justin Bieber	3:26
2.	"Hold My Hand"	Jess Glynne	3:47
3.	"Writing's on the Wall"	Sam Smith	4:38
4.	"Uptown Funk"	Mark Ronson featuring Bruno Mars	4:30
5.	"King"	Years & Years	3:35
6.	"Lean On"	Major Lazer & DJ Snake featuring MØ	2:56
7.	"Drag Me Down"	One Direction	3:12
8.	"Ship to Wreck"	Florence and the Machine	3:54
9.	"Believe"	Mumford & Sons	3:41
10.	"Go Out"	Blur	4:41
11.	"Ballad of the Mighty I"	Noel Gallagher's High Flying Birds	5:15
12.	"I Wanna Get Lost with You"	Stereophonics	3:50
13.	"Kathleen"	Catfish and the Bottlemen	2:41
14.	"Giant Peach"	Wolf Alice	4:35
15.	"Pedestrian at Best"	Courtney Barnett	3:50
16.	"Don't Wanna Fight"	Alabama Shakes	3:53
17.	"Someone New"	Hozier	3:42
18.	"Breathe Life"	Jack Garratt	4:23
19.	"Mountain at My Gates"	Foals	4:02
20.	"Chateau Lobby #4 (In C for Two Virgins)"	Father John Misty	2:50
21.	"Let It Go"	James Bay	4:21

==== CD 2 ====
No.	Title	Artist(s)	Length
1.	"Can't Feel My Face"	The Weeknd	3:33
2.	"Adventure of a Lifetime"	Coldplay	4:23
3.	"Bloodstream"	Ed Sheeran & Rudimental	5:08
4.	"Love Me like You Do"	Ellie Goulding	4:12
5.	"Where Are Ü Now"	Jack Ü & Justin Bieber	4:10
6.	"How Deep Is Your Love"	Calvin Harris & Disciples	3:32
7.	"Not Letting Go"	Tinie Tempah featuring Jess Glynne	3:48
8.	"Downtown"	Macklemore & Ryan Lewis featuring Eric Nally, Melle Mel, Kool Moe Dee & Grandmaster Caz	4:52
9.	"Marvin Gaye"	Charlie Puth featuring Meghan Trainor	3:07
10.	"Real Love"	Clean Bandit & Jess Glynne	3:39
11.	"Want to Want Me"	Jason Derulo	3:27
12.	"In2"	WSTRN	4:02
13.	"Trap Queen"	Fetty Wap	3:35
14.	"Shut Up and Dance"	Walk the Moon	3:17
15.	"Hey Mama"	David Guetta featuring Nicki Minaj, Bebe Rexha & Afrojack	3:12
16.	"G.D.F.R."	Flo Rida featuring Sage the Gemini & Lookas	3:10
17.	"Preach"	Drake featuring PartyNextDoor	3:56
18.	"Runnin' (Lose It All)"	Naughty Boy featuring Beyoncé & Arrow Benjamin	3:33
19.	"Runaway (U & I)"	Galantis	3:47
20.	"Lay It All on Me"	Rudimental featuring Ed Sheeran	4:02
21.	"Gosh"	Jamie xx	4:51

==== CD 3 ====
No.	Title	Artist(s)	Length
1.	"Someone like You"	Adele	4:47
2.	"Valerie"	Mark Ronson featuring Amy Winehouse	3:39
3.	"Rock 'n' Roll Star"	Oasis	5:23
4.	""You Got the Dirtee Love""	Florence and the Machine & Dizzee Rascal	3:38
5.	"Pompeii" / "Waiting All Night"	Bastille & Rudimental featuring Ella Eyre	5:47
6.	"Make Me Smile (Come Up and See Me)"	Robbie Williams & Tom Jones	5:28
7.	"Treasure"	Bruno Mars	2:58
8.	"The Fear"	Lily Allen	3:27
9.	"Next to Me"	Emeli Sandé	3:16
10.	"She Said"	Plan B	3:31
11.	"These Days"	Take That	3:52
12.	"She's Kinda Hot"	5 Seconds of Summer	3:36
13.	"Up"	Olly Murs featuring Demi Lovato	3:44
14.	"High by the Beach"	Lana Del Rey	4:18
15.	"Wasn't Expecting That"	Jamie Lawson	3:21
16.	"Wings"	Birdy	4:12
17.	"Black Magic"	Little Mix	3:31
18.	"Cheerleader"	OMI	3:01
19.	"Elastic Heart"	Sia	4:17
20.	"Lips Are Movin"	Meghan Trainor	3:02

=== Weekly charts ===
Chart (2016)	Peak position
Irish Compilation Albums	5
UK Compilation Albums	1
