= Brit Awards 2015 =

British music awards ceremony

- Date: 25 February 2015
- Venue: The O2 Arena
- Hosted by: Ant & Dec

Highlights
- Most awards: Ed Sheeran; Sam Smith (2 each)
- Most nominations: Sam Smith (6)
- Website: http://www.brits.co.uk/

Television/radio coverage
- Network: ITV; YouTube
- Viewership: 5.8 million

Brit Awards 2015 was held on 25 February 2015. This was the 35th edition of the British Phonographic Industry's annual pop music awards. The awards ceremony was held at The O2 Arena in London, presented by Ant & Dec. This was their second time hosting, and their first since 2001. Award nominations were revealed on 15 January 2015. Tracey Emin became the fifth artist to style the BRITs statue.

== Performances ==
=== The Brits Are Coming: Nominations Launch Party ===
Reggie Yates hosted the launch show inside the ITV Studios in London on Thursday 15 January.

Artist(s)	Song(s)	UK Singles Chart reaction
Jessie Ware	"You and I (Forever)"	N/A
Clean Bandit; Jess Glynne	"Real Love" "Rather Be"	12 (–1); 39 (–9)
FKA Twigs	"Hide" "Pendulum"	N/A
James Bay	"Let It Go"	N/A

=== Main show performances ===
The first three performers were announced for the 2015 Brit Awards on 16 December 2014.

Artist(s)	Song	UK Singles Chart reaction (week ending 7 March 2015)	UK Albums Chart reaction (week ending 7 March 2015)
Taylor Swift	"Blank Space"	29 (+/–)	1989 – 5 (+3)
Sam Smith	"Lay Me Down"	15 (+73)	In the Lonely Hour – 1 (+1)
Royal Blood	"Figure It Out"	43 (re-entry)	Royal Blood – 3 (+15)
Ed Sheeran	"Bloodstream"	35 (re-entry)	x – 2 (+1) + – 25 (+21)
Kanye West; Theophilus London; Allan Kingdom	"All Day"	18 (debut)	N/A
Take That	"Let in the Sun"	did not chart	III – 18 (+3)
George Ezra	"Budapest"	18 (+12)	Wanted on Voyage – 4 (+2)
Paloma Faith	"Only Love Can Hurt Like This"	32 (re-entry)	A Perfect Contradiction – 8 (+25)
Madonna	"Living for Love"	26 (debut)	Celebration – 38 (re-entry)

== Winners and nominees ==
British Album of the Year (presented by Russell Crowe)	British Producer of the Year
Ed Sheeran – X; Sam Smith – In the Lonely Hour; Royal Blood – Royal Blood; alt-j – This Is All Yours; George Ezra – Wanted on Voyage	Paul Epworth; Alison Goldfrapp & Will Gregory; Flood; Jake Gosling
British Single of the Year (presented by Lisa Snowdon and Lionel Richie)	British Video of the Year (presented by Jimmy Carr and Karlie Kloss)
Mark Ronson featuring Bruno Mars – "Uptown Funk"; Calvin Harris – "Summer"; Clean Bandit featuring Jess Glynne – "Rather Be"; Duke Dumont featuring Jax Jones - "I Got U"; Ed Sheeran – "Thinking Out Loud"; Ella Henderson – "Ghost"; George Ezra – "Budapest"; Route 94 featuring Jess Glynne – "My Love"; Sam Smith – "Stay with Me"; Sigma – "Nobody to Love"	One Direction – "You & I"; Ed Sheeran – "Thinking Out Loud"; Mark Ronson featuring Bruno Mars – "Uptown Funk"; Sam Smith – "Stay with Me"; Calvin Harris - "Summer"; Eliminated: Charli XCX – "Boom Clap"; Duke Dumont featuring Jax Jones – "I Got U"; Rita Ora – "I Will Never Let You Down"; Route 94 featuring Jess Glynne – "My Love"; Sigma – "Nobody to Love"
British Male Solo Artist (presented by Orlando Bloom and Rita Ora)	British Female Solo Artist (presented by Mark Ronson)
Ed Sheeran; Damon Albarn; George Ezra; Paolo Nutini; Sam Smith	Paloma Faith; Ella Henderson; FKA Twigs; Jessie Ware; Lily Allen
British Group (presented by Jimmy Page)	British Breakthrough Act (presented by Fearne Cotton and Charli XCX)
Royal Blood; Alt-J; Clean Bandit; Coldplay; One Direction	Sam Smith; CHVRCHES; FKA twigs; George Ezra; Royal Blood
International Male Solo Artist (presented by Cara Delevingne)	International Female Solo Artist (presented by Lewis Hamilton and Ellie Goulding)
Pharrell Williams; Beck; Hozier; Jack White; John Legend	Taylor Swift; Beyoncé; Lana Del Rey; Sia; St. Vincent
International Group (presented by John Bishop)	Critics' Choice Award
Foo Fighters; 5 Seconds of Summer; Black Keys; First Aid Kit; The War on Drugs	James Bay; George the Poet; Years & Years

=== Global Success Award ===
- Sam Smith (presented by Kim Kardashian)

== Multiple nominations and awards ==
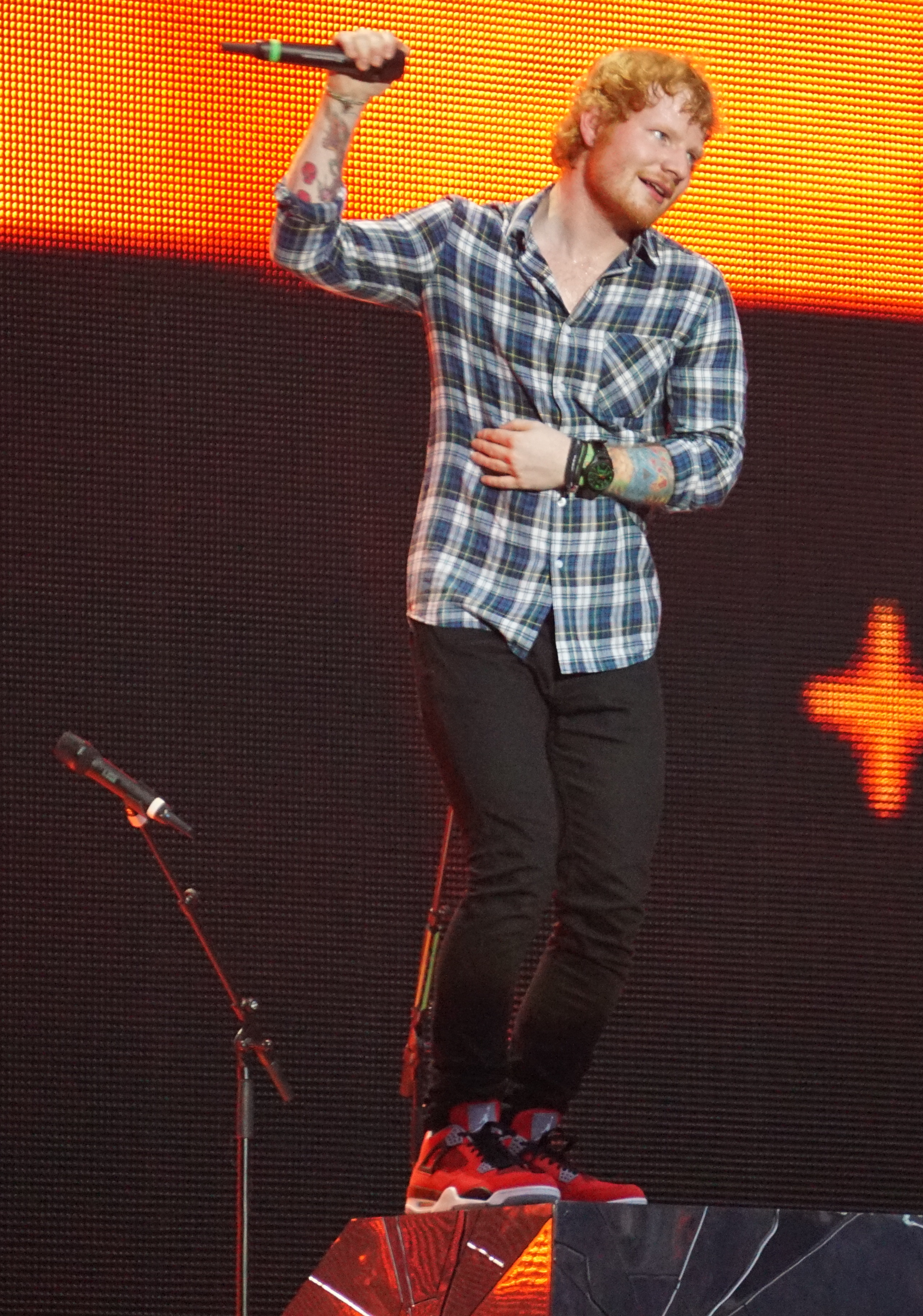
Two-time winner Ed Sheeran

Artists that received multiple nominations
Nominations	Artist
5	Sam Smith
4 (3)	Ed Sheeran
4 (3)	George Ezra
4 (3)	Royal Blood
3 (2)	alt-J
3 (2)	Jess Glynne
2 (12)	Ariana Grande
2 (12)	Bruno Mars
2 (12)	Clean Bandit
2 (12)	Duke Dumont
2 (12)	Ella Henderson
2 (12)	FKA Twigs
2 (12)	Jessie J
2 (12)	Mark Ronson
2 (12)	Nicki Minaj
2 (12)	One Direction
2 (12)	Route 94
2 (12)	Sigma

Artists that received multiple awards
Awards	Artist
2	Ed Sheeran

== Notable moments ==
=== Kanye West performance ===
Kanye West was confirmed to perform just the day before the awards took place. He performed his song "All Day" amongst a large entourage including grime musicians Skepta, Stormzy, Krept and Konan, Jammer and Novelist. The entourage held flamethrowers and wore all black. However, his performance was repeatedly muted throughout most of the track for those watching on television due to the extreme explicit language featured within the song's lyrics, with the use of "nigga" being repeatedly rapped live on ITV. The performance drew mixed reactions from the crowd, with presenters Ant & Dec joking about it afterwards, and divided opinions on social media; some criticising West's performance and some criticising how ITV dealt with the issue.

=== Madonna incident ===
Madonna was the last to perform on the night, singing a version of her song "Living for Love" to close the show and mark her first Brits performance in 20 years. Shortly into her performance, a problem with her costume caused her to be pulled down a flight of stairs that made up part of the stage.

She later took to Instagram to confirm that she was uninjured, posting "Thanks for the good wishes! I'm fine". It was later revealed that her cape was tied too tightly when her dancers attempted to remove it from her neck, causing her to crash to the floor and leaving the audience in shock. After several seconds, she continued the performance as planned.

== Brit Awards 2015 album ==
Brit Awards 2015

Compilation album / Box set by Various artists
- Released: 13 February 2015
- Label: UMTV

Various artists chronology
Brit Awards 2014 (2014)	''Brit Awards 2015'' (2015)	Brit Awards 2016 (2016)

The Brit Awards 2015 is a compilation and box set which includes the "63 biggest tracks from the past year". The box set has three discs with a total of sixty-three songs by various artists.

=== Track listing ===
==== CD 1 ====
No.	Title	Artist(s)	Length
1.	"Thinking Out Loud"	Ed Sheeran	4:41
2.	"Budapest"	George Ezra	3:21
3.	"Rather Be"	Clean Bandit featuring Jess Glynne	3:47
4.	"Ghost"	Ella Henderson	3:36
5.	"All of Me"	John Legend	4:29
6.	"Let It Go"	Idina Menzel	3:44
7.	"Magic"	Coldplay	4:45
8.	"Blame"	Calvin Harris featuring John Newman	3:34
9.	"I Will Never Let You Down"	Rita Ora	3:23
10.	"Changing"	Sigma featuring Paloma Faith	3:25
11.	"Problem"	Ariana Grande featuring Iggy Azalea	3:13
12.	"Fancy"	Iggy Azalea featuring Charli XCX	3:19
13.	"Boom Clap"	Charli XCX	2:49
14.	"West Coast"	Lana Del Rey	4:25
15.	"Superheroes"	The Script	4:03
16.	"She Looks So Perfect"	5 Seconds of Summer	3:22
17.	"Hold Back the River"	James Bay	3:59
18.	"Lazaretto"	Jack White	3:39
19.	"Red Eyes"	The War on Drugs	4:58
20.	"Everyday Robots"	Damon Albarn	3:57
21.	"Take Me to Church"	Hozier	4:02

==== CD 2 ====
No.	Title	Artist(s)	Length
1.	"Stay with Me"	Sam Smith	2:52
2.	"Steal My Girl"	One Direction	3:48
3.	"Wrapped Up"	Olly Murs featuring Travie McCoy	3:05
4.	"Bang Bang"	Jessie J, Ariana Grande and Nicki Minaj	3:19
5.	"Only Love Can Hurt Like This"	Paloma Faith	3:52
6.	"Scream (Funk My Life Up)"	Paolo Nutini	3:09
7.	"Chandelier"	Sia	3:36
8.	"All About That Bass"	Meghan Trainor	3:11
9.	"Lovers on the Sun"	David Guetta featuring Sam Martin	3:23
10.	"Right Here"	Jess Glynne	3:40
11.	"Marilyn Monroe"	Pharrell Williams	5:51
12.	"Air Balloon"	Lily Allen	3:48
13.	"My Silver Lining"	First Aid Kit	3:35
14.	"Hunger of the Pine"	Alt-J	5:00
15.	"The Miracle (Of Joey Ramone)"	U2	4:16
16.	"In the Heat of the Moment"	Noel Gallagher's High Flying Birds	3:29
17.	"Rainbow"	Robert Plant	4:18
18.	"Video Girl"	FKA Twigs	3:47
19.	"Time"	Jungle	3:33
20.	"Eez-eh"	Kasabian	3:00
21.	"Turn Blue"	The Black Keys	3:43
22.	"Figure It Out"	Royal Blood	3:04

==== CD 3 ====
No.	Title	Artist(s)	Length
1.	"Another One Bites the Dust"	Queen	3:35
2.	"One More Time"	Daft Punk featuring Romanthony	5:20
3.	"Rock Your Body"	Justin Timberlake	4:27
4.	"Heaven"	Emeli Sandé	4:12
5.	"Patience"	Take That	3:20
6.	"Angels"	Robbie Williams	4:24
7.	"I Kissed a Girl"	Katy Perry	3:00
8.	"Poker Face"	Lady Gaga	3:58
9.	"Faith"	George Michael	3:26
10.	"Your Song"	Elton John	4:03
11.	"Live and Let Die"	Paul McCartney and Wings	3:12
12.	"Maggie May"	Rod Stewart	5:15
13.	"Ironic"	Alanis Morissette	3:48
14.	"Everywhere"	Fleetwood Mac	3:43
15.	"Don't Look Back in Anger"	Oasis	4:47
16.	"Seven Nation Army"	The White Stripes	3:52
17.	"Just the Way You Are"	Bruno Mars	3:39
18.	"Life on Mars"	David Bowie	3:48
19.	"Wuthering Heights"	Kate Bush	4:28
20.	"Let's Get Ready to Rhumble"	PJ & Duncan	4:00

=== Weekly charts ===
Chart (2015)	Peak position
Irish Multi-Artist Compilations	5
UK Compilations	2

== Ratings and critical reception ==
An average of 5.3 million people tuned in to the ceremony on ITV, according to overnight ratings – rising to 5.8 million when ITV+1 viewers are added in.
