= Don't Be So Hard on Yourself =

Single by Jess Glynne

from the album I Cry When I Laugh
- Released: 14 August 2015
- Genre: Dance-pop; soul; house
- Length: 3:31
- Label: Atlantic; Warner
- Songwriters: Tom Barnes; Jessica Glynne; Wayne Hector; Peter Kelleher; Ben Kohn
- Producer: TMS

Jess Glynne singles chronology
"Not Letting Go" (2015)	"Don't Be So Hard on Yourself" (2015)	"Take Me Home" (2015)

"Don't Be So Hard on Yourself" is a song by English singer and songwriter Jess Glynne. It was released as the fourth single from her debut album I Cry When I Laugh on 14 August 2015. It was written by Glynne, Wayne Hector and TMS who also produced the song. Lyrically, the song tells about moving on from hard times and "not being hard on oneself."

The song was critically acclaimed for its lyrical content and Glynne's vocal delivery. On 14 August 2015 the song entered the UK Singles Chart at number 78 based on streams alone, reaching number one the following week. The song became Glynne's fifth UK number-one single (including her featured singles), tying Cheryl's record for the most number ones by a British female solo artist.

== Background and release ==
After the success of "Hold My Hand", Jess Glynne was featured on Tinie Tempah's single "Not Letting Go", with both songs reaching the top of the UK Singles Chart. Later, in June 2015, she went through a vocal surgery, being forced to cancel a number of shows. On 29 June 2015, she announced "Don't Be So Hard on Yourself" as the album's third single and uploaded 1:30 of the song on her SoundCloud account. It was released firstly to UK radio stations on 1 July 2015 and later received its full release on 14 August 2015, one week prior to the album's release.

== Composition and lyrics ==
"Don't Be So Hard on Yourself" was written by Jess Glynne, Wayne Hector with its producers Tom Barnes, Peter Kelleher and Ben Kohn, also known as the production team TMS. According to the sheet music published at Musicnotes.com by Universal Music Publishing Group, the song is written in the key of G major (recorded a half-step lower in F♯ major). The song moves in common time at a tempo of 120 beats per minute, with Glynne's vocal range spanning from the low-note of C♯_{3} to the high-note of C♯_{5}. Its instrumentation consists in piano, guitar and violins, filled with strings, glittery synths and emotive vocals. In its bridge, the song also features a "multi-tracked choir and military tattoo drums." It is a dance-pop song with influences of disco, house and soul-pop. Lyrically, it talks about overcoming a broken heart and to not let sadness defeat you. In the chorus, she sings: "Don’t be so hard on yourself, no / Learn to forgive, learn to let go / Everyone trips, everyone falls / So don’t be so hard on yourself, no." When asked about the story behind the song, she elaborated: "When I was meeting my publisher, managers and label and everything was happening for me, I was going through a really hard time. I had my heart broken and I was in a dark place. It was even harder because my dreams were coming true and I had to put a smile on my face every day and power through."

== Critical reception ==
The song received generally positive reviews from music critics. Rachel Sonis of Idolator named it a "massive floor-filler", while Bianca Gracie of the same publication noted that "there is a refreshingly somber tone that saves it from being too predictable." Amy Davidson of Digital Spy gave the single 4 out of 5 stars stating, "[W]ith her vocals shooting to the very perimeters of the track, 'Don't Be So Hard On Yourself' sees Glynne continue to wear her disco influences on her sleeve for a new take on the well-worn 'feel-good anthem'." Popjustice called it brilliant, praising its "great post-chorus and chorus" as well as its "strings". While recommending the song for download, Andy Gill of The Independent wrote that "[it] could be the project's mission statement, with Glynne's darkly tremulous delivery a kind of turbo-powered warble that conveys strength overcoming tribulation, a message under-scored by the rising figure of the backing vocals." Ian Gittins of Virgin Media praised her "huge, resonant voice, free of melisma [that] inhabits every crevice of the anthemic [track]."

Matthew Scott Donnelly of Pop Crush opined that the song "uses upbeat soul as a vehicle to deliver sonic-cheeriness, [...] becom[ing] a warning against self-deprecation. In other words, it's your new preferred empowerment anthem." Andy Baber of MusicOMH called it "irresistibly catchy", praising the fact that it "relies simply on a driving clapped beat and a jaunty piano riff." John Aizlewood of London Evening Standard called it "a windswept delight and bold is always more fun than mealy-mouthed." Paul MacInnes of The Guardian compared it to songs by Emeli Sandé, describing it as "a big piano pop song that invites the listener to push on through the dark days." Hazel Cills wrote for Spin noted that the album can be "relentless in this 'lift yourself up' message, citing the song as "the cream of this crop", observing that is "punctuated by swooning violins and a house-evoking piano melody fit for the club."

== Chart performance ==
In the United Kingdom, "Don't Be So Hard on Yourself" entered the UK Singles Chart at number 78 based on streams alone. The following week, after its release, the song reached the top of the charts, becoming her fifth number-one single, matching the record for a British female solo artist, held by Cheryl. Glynne has previously reached the top of the charts with Clean Bandit's "Rather Be", Route 94's "My Love", her own "Hold My Hand" and "Not Letting Go" with Tinie Tempah. In Australia, the song was Glynne's first solo top-ten hit and her highest-charting single since "Rather Be" (2014). It debuted at number 37 on the ARIA Singles Chart week ending 6 September 2015, before peaking at number 17 two weeks later. After remaining for another week at number 17, the song fell to numbers 21 and 24, the following two weeks, however it later climbed to number 12, before finally peaking at number 10, on 1 November 2015.

== Live performances ==
On 23 May 2015, Glynne performed "Don't Be So Hard on Yourself" at BBC Radio 1's Big Weekend 2015 in Norwich.

== Music video ==
A music video to accompany the release of "Don't Be So Hard on Yourself" was first released onto YouTube on 9 July 2015 at a total length of four minutes and ten seconds.

== Track listing ==
Digital download
No.	Title	Length
1.	"Don't Be So Hard on Yourself"	3:31

== Charts ==
=== Weekly charts ===
Chart (2015)	Peak position
Australia (ARIA)	10
Austria (Ö3 Austria Top 40)	65
Belgium (Ultratip Bubbling Under Flanders)	1
Belgium Dance (Ultratop Flanders)	21
Belgium (Ultratip Bubbling Under Wallonia)	26
Belgium Dance (Ultratop Wallonia)	41
Czech Republic Airplay (ČNS IFPI)	80
Euro Digital Song Sales (Billboard)	1
Germany (GfK)	46
Hungary (Rádiós Top 40)	2
Hungary (Single Top 40)	9
Iceland (RÚV)	27
Ireland (IRMA)	13
Italy (FIMI)	47
Mexico Ingles Airplay (Billboard)	14
Netherlands (Dutch Top 40 Tipparade)	1
New Zealand Heatseekers (Recorded Music NZ)	4
Poland Airplay (ZPAV)	45
Poland (Polish Airplay New)	1
Scotland Singles (Official Charts)	1
Slovakia Airplay (ČNS IFPI)	29
Slovenia (SloTop50)	35
UK Singles (Official Charts)	1
US Hot Dance/Electronic Songs (Billboard)	21

=== Year-end charts ===
Chart (2015)	Position
Hungary (Rádiós Top 40)	30
UK Singles (Official Charts Company)	39

Chart (2016)	Position
Hungary (Rádiós Top 40)	66
US Hot Dance/Electronic Songs (Billboard)	90

== Certifications ==
Region	Certification	Certified units/sales
Australia (ARIA)	Platinum	70,000^{‡}
Denmark (IFPI Danmark)	Gold	45,000^{‡}
Italy (FIMI)	Platinum	50,000^{‡}
New Zealand (RMNZ)	2× Platinum	60,000^{‡}
United Kingdom (BPI)	3× Platinum	1,800,000^{‡}
^{‡} Sales+streaming figures based on certification alone.

== Release history ==
Region	Date	Format	Label
Ireland	14 August 2015	Digital download	Atlantic
United Kingdom	14 August 2015	Digital download	Atlantic
