= Hold My Hand (Jess Glynne song) =

2015 single by Jess Glynne

Single by Jess Glynne

from the album I Cry When I Laugh
- Released: 22 March 2015
- Recorded: 2014
- Genre: Eurodance
- Length: 3:47
- Label: Atlantic; Warner
- Songwriters: Janee Bennett; Jessica Glynne; Jack Patterson; Ina Wroldsen
- Producer: Starsmith

Jess Glynne singles chronology
"Real Love" (2014)	"Hold My Hand" (2015)	"Not Letting Go" (2015)

Music video
- "Hold My Hand" on YouTube

"Hold My Hand" is a song by English singer and songwriter Jess Glynne. It was written by Jack Patterson, Janee Bennett, Ina Wroldsen and Glynne. The song was released on 22 March 2015 as her third solo single, following "Home" and "Right Here". A music video for the song was uploaded to Glynne's own YouTube channel on 23 February 2015.

The song debuted at number one on the UK Singles Chart on 29 March 2015 and held that position for three consecutive weeks. It also reached number one in Wallonia (Belgium) and Israel, number seven in the Irish Singles Chart, and became Glynne's first solo chart entry on the US Billboard Hot 100, peaking at number 86 on the chart. The song was performed by Glynne on the semi-finals of The Voice UK. Since late 2015, the song has become synonymous with adverts for the British holiday company Jet2holidays.

== Composition ==
"Hold My Hand" is written in the key of C major with a tempo of 123 beats per minute in common time. The verses follow a chord progression of C5 – C5/B – C5/A – Fsus2 – C5/G – C5, and Glynne's vocals span from G_{3} to A_{5}.

== Chart performance ==
"Hold My Hand" debuted at number one on the UK Singles Chart on 29 March 2015 with sales of 97,000. The single outsold its closest competitor, James Bay's "Hold Back the River", by over 40,000 units. The single became Glynne's first solo number one in the UK; she had previously scored two number one singles in 2014 as a featured artist, on Clean Bandit's "Rather Be" and Route 94's "My Love". The song retained the top position in its second week on the chart, with combined chart sales of just over 80,000, including 1.62 million streams. The song also retained the top position in its third week on the chart, beating Nick Jonas' "Jealous" in streaming format. In the United States, "Hold My Hand" debuted at number 88 on the Billboard Hot 100 chart, on the issue dated 3 October 2015 and has peaked at number 86.

In December 2015 the song was shortlisted for "Song of the Year" in the 2015 BBC Music Awards.

== Music video ==
The official music video for "Hold My Hand" was uploaded to Glynne's own YouTube channel on 23 February 2015 and was directed by Emil Nava. In the Californian desert, mostly at sunset, Glynne rides an SUV and sings while encircled by dirt bikes, and also on a large truck. She and her friends enjoy a campfire and dance freely.

== Usage in media ==
Since late 2015, it has been featured in advertisements for Jet2holidays, as well as being used for various in-aircraft announcements with Jet2.com. In 2025, the song's use in Jet2's advertising campaigns, featuring a voiceover by Zoë Lister, gained attention as a viral social media audio often juxtaposed in irony with clips of holiday mishaps. Glynne and Lister were interviewed by Capital, with the former describing the song's resurgence with the associated campaign a "massive surprise". On 30 July, the White House's official Twitter account posted a video showing the deportation of multiple alleged undocumented immigrants with the sound and captioned "When ICE books you a one-way Jet2 holiday to deportation. Nothing beats it!". The clip was criticised, with Glynne herself responding: "This post honestly makes me sick. My music is about love, unity, and spreading positivity – never about division or hate". Both Jet2holidays and Lister have also condemned the usage of the song as well.

The song was previously used in an advertisement for Coca-Cola in 2015, while also featured on the original soundtrack for the 2016 film Bridget Jones's Baby.

== Track listing ==
Digital download – single
No.	Title	Length
1.	"Hold My Hand"	3:47

Digital download – Remixes
No.	Title	Length
1.	"Hold My Hand" (MJ Cole Remix)	5:46
2.	"Hold My Hand" (Chris Lake Remix)	4:59
3.	"Hold My Hand" (Le Youth Remix)	3:59

== Charts ==
=== Weekly charts ===
Chart (2015–2025)	Peak position
Australia (ARIA)	16
Austria (Ö3 Austria Top 40)	27
Belgium (Ultratop 50 Flanders)	15
Belgium Dance (Ultratop Flanders)	12
Belgium (Ultratip Bubbling Under Wallonia)	1
Belgium Dance (Ultratop Wallonia)	21
Canada AC (Billboard)	34
Hot Canadian Digital Song Sales (Billboard)	10
Canada CHR/Top 40 (Billboard)	45
Canada Hot AC (Billboard)	41
Croatia International Airplay (Top lista)	1
Czech Republic Airplay (ČNS IFPI)	24
Czech Republic Singles Digital (ČNS IFPI)	22
Euro Digital Song Sales (Billboard)	1
Finland Airplay (Radiosoittolista)	26
France (SNEP)	89
Germany (GfK)	19
Hungary (Editors' Choice Top 40)	16
Hungary (Single Top 40)	35
Hungary (Stream Top 40)	29
Israel International Airplay (Media Forest)	1
Ireland (IRMA)	7
Italy (FIMI)	13
Japan Hot 100 (Billboard)	33
Mexico (Billboard Mexican Airplay)	7
Mexico (Billboard Ingles Airplay)	6
Mexico Anglo (Monitor Latino)	6
Netherlands (Dutch Top 40)	15
Netherlands (Single Top 100)	15
Poland Airplay (ZPAV)	12
Romania (Airplay 100)	42
Scottish Singles Sales (Official Charts)	1
Slovakia Airplay (ČNS IFPI)	23
Slovakia Singles Digital (ČNS IFPI)	20
Slovenia (SloTop50)	23
Spain (Promusicae)	21
Sweden (Sverigetopplistan)	56
Switzerland (Schweizer Hitparade)	20
UK Singles (Official Charts)	1
US Billboard Hot 100	86
US Adult Contemporary (Billboard)	26
US Adult Pop Airplay (Billboard)	14
US Hot Dance/Electronic Songs (Billboard)	6
US Pop Airplay (Billboard)	27

=== Year-end charts ===
Chart (2015)	Position
Belgium (Ultratop 50 Flanders)	93
Belgium Dance (Ultratop Flanders)	46
Belgium Dance (Ultratop Wallonia)	82
Israel (Media Forest)	12
Italy (FIMI)	54
Netherlands (Dutch Top 40)	58
Netherlands (Single Top 100)	65
Spain (PROMUSICAE)	94
UK Singles (Official Charts Company)	14
US Hot/Dance Electronic Songs (Billboard)	15

Chart (2016)	Position
US Hot Dance/Electronic Songs (Billboard)	39

=== Decade-end charts ===
Chart (2010–2019)	Position
UK Singles (Official Charts Company)	95

== Certifications ==
Region	Certification	Certified units/sales
Australia (ARIA)	Platinum	70,000^{^}
Canada (Music Canada)	Platinum	80,000^{‡}
Denmark (IFPI Danmark)	Gold	45,000^{‡}
Germany (BVMI)	Gold	200,000^{‡}
Italy (FIMI)	2× Platinum	100,000^{‡}
New Zealand (RMNZ)	2× Platinum	60,000^{‡}
Poland (ZPAV)	Gold	25,000^{‡}
Spain (Promusicae)	Gold	20,000^{‡}
United Kingdom (BPI)	3× Platinum	1,800,000^{‡}
United States (RIAA)	Platinum	1,000,000^{‡}
^{^} Shipments figures based on certification alone.^{‡} Sales+streaming figures based on certification alone.

== Release history ==
Region	Date	Label	Format
United Kingdom	22 March 2015	Atlantic; Warner	Digital download
