= Jess (album) =

Studio album by Jess Glynne
- Released: 26 April 2024
- Recorded: 2022–2023
- Length: 46:20
- Label: Ivy Songs; EMI
- Producer: Fred Ball; Knox Brown; Charlie Coffeen; DaHeala; Digi; Jess Glynne; Ollie Green; Emile Haynie; Jim-E Stack; Greg Kurstin; Johan Lenox; Roy Lenzo; Steve Mac; Malay; P2J; Jack Patterson; Stuart Price; Chrome Sparks; Sub Focus

Jess Glynne chronology
Always In Between (2018)	Jess (2024)

Singles from Jess
- 1. "Silly Me" Released: 28 April 2023; 2. "What Do You Do?" Released: 14 July 2023; 3. "Friend of Mine" Released: 20 October 2023; 4. "Enough" Released: 16 February 2024; 5. "Easy" Released: 26 April 2024

Jess (stylised in all caps) is the third studio album by British singer Jess Glynne. It was released on 26 April 2024 by Ivy Songs, through EMI Records, marking Glynne's first album with the company since departing long-term record label Atlantic Records. It was preceded by the release of four singles: "Silly Me", "What Do You Do?", "Friend of Mine" and "Enough". A fifth single, "Easy", was released on the same day as the album.

== Background ==
Following the release and promotion of her second album, Always In Between (2018), Glynne went on a hiatus from music. Following a disagreement with her record label about the future direction of her music, Glynne split from Atlantic Records in January 2022. When announcing her first release, "Silly Me", under EMI, she confirmed that the split with Atlantic and her management had been amicable and stemmed from Glynne wanting to explore a new sonic direction. Glynne confirmed that she had signed a new record deal with EMI and would be releasing new music in 2023. Much of the album was recorded between 2022 and 2023, while between labels. It included studio sessions with Greg Kurstin, Malay and Boots. In an interview with BBC News in January 2024, Glynne confirmed that she was "one song away from completing the album", contradicting earlier statements in 2023 that the album was "done" and suggesting that changes had been made. It was confirmed that the album would be released on 26 April 2024.

== Singles ==
"Silly Me" was released 28 April 2023, and was co-written with Knox Brown, P2J and Mike Horner. A music video directed by Vasso + Furman was shot in Serbia and released alongside "Silly Me". A second song, "What Do You Do?" was released on 14 July 2023. The music video for "What Do You Do?" was filmed in New York and was released three weeks later. The third single was "Friend of Mine" and was released on 20 October 2023. A fourth single, "Enough", was confirmed to be the album's lead single. The music video for "Easy" was released on the same day as the album, 26 April.

== Track listing ==
Jess track listing
No.	Title	Writer(s)	Producer(s)	Length
1.	"Intro"	Jess Glynne; Janée "Jin Jin" Bennett; Knox Brown	Digi; Brown	1:17
2.	"Silly Me"	Glynne; Brown; Mike Horner; P2J	Brown; Glynne; P2J; Malay; Alastair O'Donnell^{[a]}	3:19
3.	"Easy"	Glynne; Jack Patterson; Bennett; Steve Mac	Jack Patterson; Steve Mac	3:07
4.	"Say No"	Glynne; James "Malay" Ho	Malay	3:15
5.	"Enough"	Glynne; Dyo; Greg Kurstin; Bennett; Brown; P2J	Kurstin; Brown; P2J	3:00
6.	"Friend of Mine"	Glynne; Ollie Green; Bennett; Nicolaas Douwma	Sub Focus; Green	3:14
7.	"Lying"	Glynne; Bennett; Jason "DaHeala" Quenneville	Glynne; Charlie Coffeen; DaHeala; Emile Haynie	4:12
8.	"Save Your Tears"	Glynne; James Harmon "Jim-E" Stack; Bennett; John Kirby; Luke Wild	Jim-E Stack	2:55
9.	"What Do You Do?"	Glynne; Simon Wilcox; Jeremy Melvin; Stuart Price	Chrome Sparks; Price	3:10
10.	"Say It Isn't True"	Glynne; Kurstin; Maureen "Mozella" McDonald	Kurstin	3:25
11.	"Chair"	Glynne; Johan Lenox; Jamil George Chammas	Digi; Lenox	2:44
12.	"Do You Know About Love?"	Glynne; Malay	Malay	3:20
13.	"We Had Something"	Glynne; Lenox; Roy Lenzo	Fred Ball; Lenox; Lenzo	2:49
14.	"Love Me"	Glynne; Melvin; Michael Matosic; Wilcox	Chrome Sparks	2:53
15.	"Promise Me"	Glynne; Kurstin	Kurstin	3:32
Total length:				46:20

=== Notes ===
- ^{^[a]} On Tidal, Alastair O'Donnell is credited under the role "music production".

== Charts ==
Chart performance
Chart (2024)	Peak position
Australian Digital Albums (ARIA)	13
Scottish Albums (OCC)	4
UK Albums (OCC)	6
