= Jess Glynne =

British singer (born 1989)

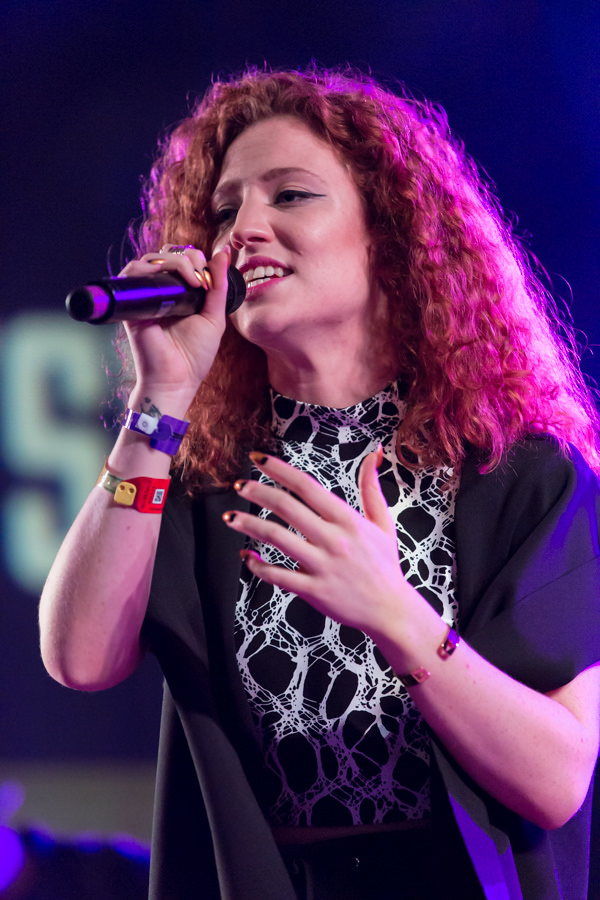
- Glynne performing at South by Southwest in 2015

Background information
- Born: Jessica Hannah Glynne; 20 October 1989 (age 37); Hampstead, London, England
- Genres: Pop; R&B; dance; soul
- Occupations: Singer; songwriter
- Works: Discography
- Years active: 2013–present
- Labels: Roc Nation; EMI; Black Butter; Atlantic
- Website: jessglynne.co.uk

Jessica Hannah Glynne (born 20 October 1989) is an English singer and songwriter. She rose to prominence with her guest performances on the 2014 singles "Rather Be" by Clean Bandit and "My Love" by Route 94, both of which peaked the UK Singles Chart. Glynne signed with Atlantic Records to release her debut studio album, I Cry When I Laugh (2015). Despite mixed critical response, it debuted atop the UK Albums Chart and spawned the successful singles "Hold My Hand" and "Don't Be So Hard on Yourself".

Glynne's second studio album, Always In Between (2018), debuted at number one in the UK and saw continued success with the singles "I'll Be There", "These Days" (with Rudimental), "All I Am", "Thursday" and "One Touch" (with Jax Jones); the first of these made Glynne the first British female solo artist to have seven number one singles on the UK Singles Chart. After parting ways with Atlantic Records, she signed with EMI Records to release her third studio album, Jess (2024).

Glynne has achieved multiple accolades throughout her career, including a Grammy Award and nine Brit Award nominations. She was considered one of the "Most Influential People Under 30" by Forbes magazine in 2019.

== Early life ==
Jessica Hannah Glynne was born in Hampstead and raised in Muswell Hill, North London, in a Jewish family. Her mother, Alexandra (née Ingram), worked in A&R in the music industry. The family name was originally Goldstein, but her grandfather changed it to Glynne.

She was requested to participate in the second season of the television show The X Factor when she was 15 years old, but dropped out of the audition process following a disagreement with the producers.

She attended Rhodes Avenue Primary School, then attended Fortismere School, where she completed her A-levels in 2008, and took various jobs at a boutique, a fitness centre and a hairdresser's.

After a period spent travelling the world, Glynne worked for a music management company in her late teens and began networking with songwriters and producers, eventually honing her artistry for four years.

== Career ==
=== 2010–2013: Career beginnings ===
Glynne completed a month-long music course at an East London college, Access to Music London, where she met her future collaborators: songwriter Jin Jin and producer Bless Beats. One of Glynne and Jin Jin's compositions caught the attention of Black Butter Records, who signed Glynne to a publishing deal and introduced her to music managers and lawyers. Black Butter co-president Joe Gossa said of Glynne, "her voice just flipped me out, there was a fierceness to it. She can talk about everyday things in this way that's just epic". She signed a contract with Atlantic Records in August 2013, consequently leaving her job at the time in brand management for a drinks company.

=== 2013–2016: I Cry When I Laugh and breakthrough ===
In 2013, deep house producer Route 94 approached Glynne about rewriting and providing vocals for his song "My Love". It was later released as a single in February 2014 and reached number one on the UK Singles Chart. It was later certified platinum by the British Phonographic Industry. British band Clean Bandit heard "My Love" and approached Glynne to feature on their song "Rather Be". Band member Jack Patterson spoke of "a real subtlety of emotion in her voice". The collaboration produced the single which also charted atop the UK charts, becoming the third fastest-selling single and most streamed song of 2014. The single attained number one and top five positions on charts across Europe and Oceania, and was a top ten hit on the US Billboard Hot 100. Both "Rather Be" and "My Love" received nominations at the BRIT Awards for Best British Single. For her work on "Rather Be", Glynne won the Grammy Award for Best Dance Recording and was nominated for Song of the Year at the inaugural BBC Music Awards.

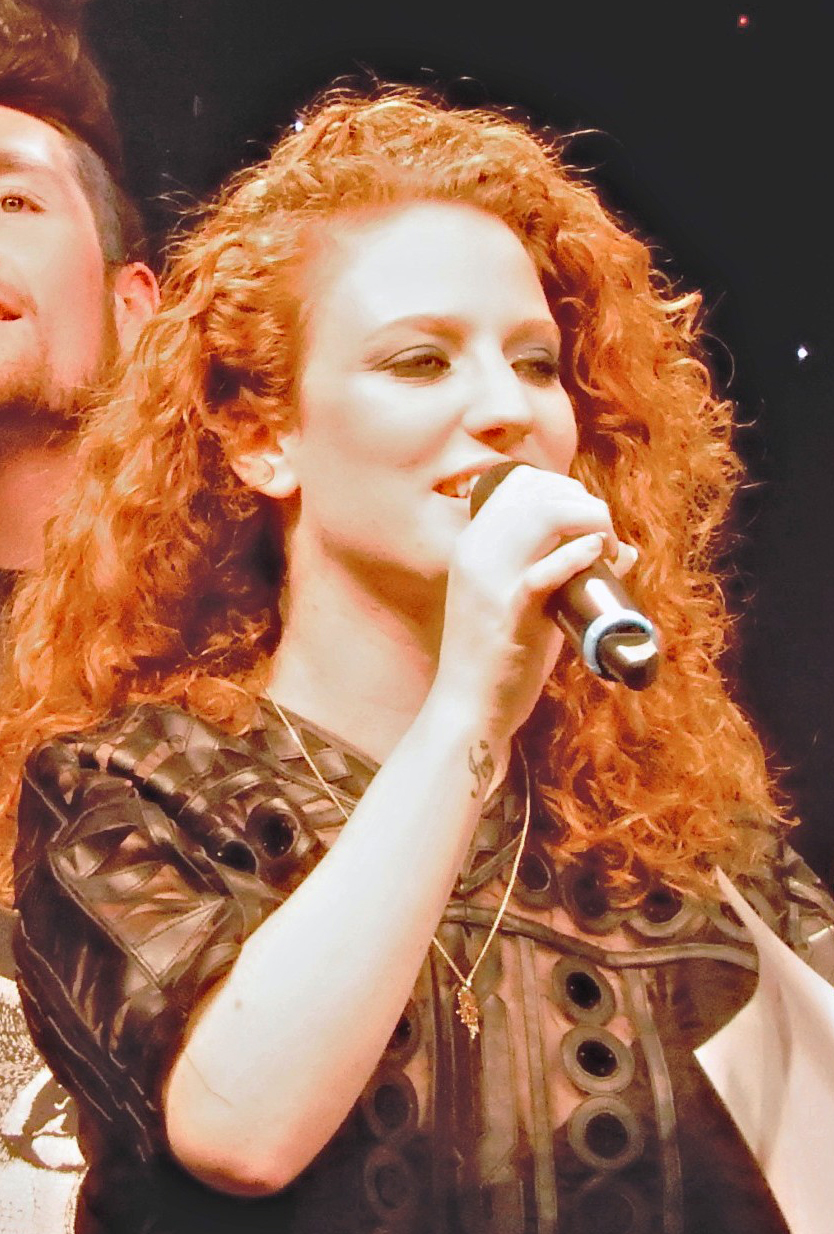
Glynne performing at Shepherd's Bush Empire in 2014

In July 2014, Glynne's debut solo single, the Gorgon City-produced "Right Here", was released. It charted in several countries, including at number six in the UK. Glynne appeared at many British music festivals during mid 2014, including Bestival, Glastonbury, Lovebox, V Festival and Wireless. She toured around the UK from October 2014, beginning in Sheffield and finishing at the Electric Brixton in London. Also during 2014, Glynne collaborated on songwriting projects with Little Mix, MO, Rudimental, and Tinie Tempah. A second collaboration with Clean Bandit, "Real Love", was released in November 2014 and reached number two in the UK.

Glynne's second solo single, "Hold My Hand", was released in March 2015. It debuted at number one in the UK, where it spent three weeks. In June 2015, Glynne was featured on "Not Letting Go", a single by English rapper Tinie Tempah. It also reached number one in the UK, bringing Glynne's total of UK number one singles to four. She underwent surgery on her vocal cords in mid-2015 and consequently cancelled several live performances, including the Glastonbury Festival. Glynne's debut album I Cry When I Laugh was released in the UK in August 2015, following the number one single "Don't Be So Hard on Yourself". It features contributions from Knox Brown, Naughty Boy, Starsmith, Talay Riley, and Switch, as well as her regular collaborators Bless Beats and Jin Jin. I Cry When I Laugh entered the UK Albums Chart at number one and later received a triple Platinum certification.

In October 2015, Glynne appeared on the twelfth series of The X Factor as a guest judge at Cheryl's Judges' Houses segment. The same month, she presented the Vice magazine-produced documentary film The Brit Invasion, which documented the rise of EDM and British dance music in the United States. Glynne's track "Take Me Home" was released as the official Children in Need 2015 charity single in November and peaked at number six in the UK, becoming Glynne's eighth overall top ten single in the country. Glynne embarked on her first UK arena tour in November, titled the Take Me Home Tour.

=== 2016–2021: Always In Between ===
In October 2016 and later in 2017, it was reported that Glynne was working with some "big" producers for her second album, including Ed Sheeran. One of the songs recorded was "Woman Like Me", which was later given to the band Little Mix for their fifth studio album LM5. In January 2018, Glynne featured on Rudimental's single "These Days" alongside American rapper Macklemore and Dan Caplen. The song was a commercial success, initially charting at number two for seven consecutive weeks behind "God's Plan" by Drake, before claiming the number one position in March. With this achievement, Glynne became the first British female solo artist in UK chart history to have six number-one singles.

In May 2018, Glynne performed at BBC Radio 1's Big Weekend in Swansea. Later that month, the lead single "I'll Be There" from her second album was released. The song later reached number one in June, becoming Glynne's seventh chart-topping single of her career. In August, second single "All I Am" was released and charted at number seven in the UK. The following month, the album Always In Between was released, becoming Glynne's second number one album. Her third single "Thursday" was released in October 2018 and peaked at number three in the UK.

Glynne embarked on her Always In Between Tour from November 2018, covering Europe, the UK and the United States, over 50 dates. Many of the tour dates on the United States leg of the tour included Leon Bridges as a featured Artist. Also in November 2018, Glynne was announced as a special guest on the Spice Girls' reunion stadium tour, held in 2019. Glynne was due to perform at BBC Radio1 Big Weekend in 2019 however dropped out at last minute.

At the 2019 Brit Awards Glynne received five nominations, including Best British Female and Best British Single with both "These Days" and "I'll Be There".

In June 2019, Glynne received a lifetime ban from the Isle of Wight Festival when she cancelled her set, giving only 10 minutes warning. The singer confessed that her reason for cancelling was after a heavy night ("It is true that I went out and celebrated the end of the Spice World tour.") and, later that month, cancelled a number of gigs "on the advice of her vocal surgeon", including a headline performance at the Rochester Castle Concerts. However, the ban was revoked less than a year later.

=== 2022–present: Career break, new label releases ===
Following a disagreement with her record label about the future direction of her music, Glynne split from Atlantic Records in January 2022. In October 2022, it was confirmed that Glynne has signed to United Talent Agency to represent her worldwide, alongside signing to the management division of Roc Nation. A month later, Glynne confirmed she had signed a new record deal with EMI and would be releasing new music in 2023.

When announcing her first release, "Silly Me", under EMI, she confirmed that the split with Atlantic and her management had been amicable and focussed on Glynne wanting to explore a new sonic direction. "Silly Me" was released 28 April 2023 and was co-written with Knox Brown, P2J Mike Horner. Glynne also confirmed other song titles for an upcoming album, including "Promise Me", "Love Is Not Enough" and "Enough". Much of the album was recorded between 2022 and 2023, while between labels. It included studio sessions with Greg Kurstin, Malay and Boots. A second song, "What Do You Do?" was released on 14 July 2023. On 26 April 2024 Glynne launched Jess, her third studio album, and was then presented with the prestigious BRIT Billion Award for achieving over 1 billion streams in the UK.

== Artistry ==
Glynne's music incorporates pop, R&B, and soul, with elements of dance.

Glynne's musical influences include Frank Ocean and Amy Winehouse. She cites Adele, Sam Cooke, Destiny's Child, Aretha Franklin, Whitney Houston and Etta James as inspirations for her vocal style and rappers such as Eminem, Jay-Z and Kendrick Lamar for her songwriting. She has also listed India Arie, Beyoncé, Mary J. Blige, Girls Aloud, Spice Girls, Mariah Carey and Mavis Staples as musical inspirations. Glynne said that Lauryn Hill's The Miseducation of Lauryn Hill was the album that motivated her to start writing songs.

== Personal life ==
Glynne was in a relationship with a woman that ended in 2013. Whilst I Cry When I Laugh was inspired by that particular break-up, Glynne has stated that she does not wish to be labelled as lesbian or bisexual. Glynne is a lifelong supporter of Arsenal and has been in a relationship with sports broadcaster and former England women's and Arsenal women's footballer Alex Scott since the summer of 2023.

In March 2021, Glynne received criticism for using the word "tranny" during an appearance on The Mo Gilligan Podcast, hosted by comedian Mo Gilligan. She subsequently apologised, stating that she was "unaware of the potency of the term until now."

== Filmography ==
=== Television ===
Year	Title	Role
2019	Neighbours	Herself
2019	The Voice Australia	Herself

== Discography ==
- I Cry When I Laugh (2015)
- Always In Between (2018)
- Jess (2024)

== Tours ==
Headlining

- Ain't Got Far to Go Tour (2015)
- Take Me Home Tour (2016–2017)
- Always In Between Tour (2018–2019)
- Summer Live Tour (2024)
- JESS: THE US TOUR (2024)
- JESS: IN EUROPE TOUR (2024)

Supporting

- Rudimental (2013)
- Beyonce (2015)
- Spice Girls – Spice World – 2019 Tour (2019)
- Maroon 5 – Love Is Like Tour (2026)

== Awards and nominations ==
Year	Awards	Category	Recipient	Outcome
2014	MOBO Awards	Best Newcomer	Herself	Nominated
2014	BBC Music Awards	Song of the Year	"Rather Be"	Nominated
2014	LOS40 Music Awards	Best English Language Song	"Rather Be"	Nominated
2015	International Dance Music Awards	Best Featured Vocalist	"Rather Be"	Nominated
2015	Billboard Music Awards	Top Dance/Electronic Song	"Rather Be"	Nominated
2015	Grammy Awards	Best Dance Recording	"Rather Be"	Won
2015	Ivor Novello Awards	Most Performed Work	"Rather Be"	Won
2015	Ivor Novello Awards	Best Contemporary Song	"Rather Be"	Won
2015	Brit Awards	British Single of the Year	"Rather Be"	Nominated
2015	Brit Awards	British Single of the Year	"My Love"	Nominated
2015	Brit Awards	British Video of the Year	"My Love"	Nominated
2015	MOBO Awards	Best Song	"Not Letting Go"	Nominated
2015	MOBO Awards	Best Female Act	Herself	Nominated
2015	Q Awards	Best New Act	Herself	Nominated
2015	MTV Japan Video Music Awards	Best New Artist International	Herself	Nominated
2015	MTV Europe Music Awards	Best New Act	Herself	Nominated
2015	MTV Europe Music Awards	Best Push Act	Herself	Nominated
2015	MTV Europe Music Awards	Best UK & Ireland Act	Herself	Nominated
2015	BBC Music Awards	Song of the Year	"Hold My Hand"	Nominated
2016	Ivor Novello Awards	PRS For Music Most Performed Work	"Hold My Hand"	Nominated
2016	Brit Awards	British Single of the Year	"Hold My Hand"	Nominated
2016	Brit Awards	British Breakthrough Act	Herself	Nominated
2016	Brit Awards	British Female Solo Artist	Herself	Nominated
2016	Silver Clef Award	Best Newcomer Award	Herself	Won
2016	Glamour Awards	Next Breakthrough	Herself	Won
2016	The A&R Awards	Breakthrough Artist Award	Herself	Won
2016	ASCAP Vanguard Award	Vanguard Award	Herself	Won
2016	ASCAP Vanguard Award	EDM Song Award	"Hold My Hand"	Won
2016	BBC Radio 1 Teen Awards	Best British Solo artist	Herself	Nominated
2016	MTV Europe Music Awards	Best World Stage Performance	Herself	Nominated
2016	BBC Music Awards	British Artist of the Year	Herself	Nominated
2018	NatWest British LGBT Awards	Music Artist of the Year	Herself	Won
2018	Attitude Awards	Music Award	Herself	Won
2019	Global Awards	Mass Appeal Award	Herself	Nominated
2019	Global Awards	Best Female	Herself	Nominated
2019	Global Awards	Best British Artist or Group	Herself	Nominated
2019	Global Awards	Best Song	"These Days"	Nominated
2019	Global Awards	Most Played Song	"These Days"	Won
2019	Brit Awards	British Video of the Year	"These Days"	Nominated
2019	Brit Awards	British Single of the Year	"These Days"	Nominated
2019	Brit Awards	British Single of the Year	"I'll Be There"	Nominated
2019	Brit Awards	British Female Solo Artist	Herself	Nominated
2019	Ivor Novello Awards	Most Performed Work	"These Days"	Won
2020	Global Awards	Best Mass Appeal Award	Herself	Nominated
2025	TikTok UK	Song of the Year	"Hold My Hand"	Won
