= Take Me Home (Jess Glynne song) =

2015 single by Jess Glynne

Single by Jess Glynne

from the album I Cry When I Laugh
- Released: 3 November 2015
- Length: 4:25 (album version); 3:30 (radio edit)
- Label: Atlantic
- Songwriter(s): Jessica Glynne; Wayne Hector; Steve McCutcheon; Nick Tsang
- Producer(s): Steve Mac

Jess Glynne singles chronology
| "Don't Be So Hard on Yourself" (2015) | "Take Me Home" (2015) | "Ain't Got Far to Go" (2016) |

Music video
- "Take Me Home" on Facebook "Take Me Home" on YouTube

"Take Me Home" is a song by English singer and songwriter Jess Glynne. It was released on 3 November 2015 as the fifth single from her debut studio album, I Cry When I Laugh (2015). A music video for the song was released on Glynne's Facebook page on 30 October. "Take Me Home" has peaked at number 4 on the Scottish Singles Chart as well as number 6 on the UK Singles Chart; it was also the BBC Children in Need single of 2015.

The song was met with highly positive critical reception, with critics commending Glynne's songwriting and vocals throughout the song further calling it as a stand-out from the album. It is Glynne's biggest solo hit in Italy, and also her second Top 5 there, being certified 3× Platinum.

== Music video ==
The official music video for the song, lasting four minutes and thirty-three seconds, was released on Glynne's Facebook page on 30 October 2015. It was given the partner rating of 15 on YouTube. Described as both "intimate" and "powerful", the video features several scenes of Glynne nude, singing to the camera and curling up in a chair. Glynne commented on the video's release, saying "Finally... I can show you all the video for "Take Me Home" – I'm so pleased and nervous that it's finally out. This is a song about the need to have someone who cares when you are at your most vulnerable. It's an emotional song for me and I have to admit it brought me to tears filming the video, not because I was sad but because I was so grateful that I had someone to get me out of the dark hole I was in."

== Track listing ==
CD single and digital download
| No. | Title | Length |
|---|---|---|
| 1. | "Take Me Home (BBC Children in Need 2015 Single)" | 3:29 |

Tiësto Remix
| No. | Title | Length |
|---|---|---|
| 1. | "Take Me Home" (Tiësto Remix) | 5:15 |

Digital download
| No. | Title | Length |
|---|---|---|
| 1. | "Take Me Home" (featuring Anthony Hamilton) | 4:23 |

== Charts ==
=== Weekly charts ===
| Chart (2015–16) | Peak position |
|---|---|
| Australia (ARIA) Tiësto remix | 98 |
| Belgium (Ultratip Bubbling Under Flanders) | 34 |
| Belgium (Ultratip Bubbling Under Wallonia) | 13 |
| Czech Republic (Rádio – Top 100) | 16 |
| Europe (Euro Digital Songs) | 5 |
| Germany (GfK) | 66 |
| Hungary (Rádiós Top 40) | 19 |
| Hungary (Single Top 40) | 40 |
| Ireland (IRMA) | 10 |
| Italy (FIMI) | 5 |
| Lebanon (Lebanese Top 20) | 20 |
| Lebanon (Lebanese Top 20) Tiësto remix | 13 |
| Mexico Ingles Airplay (Billboard) | 8 |
| Netherlands (Dutch Top 40 Tipparade) | 13 |
| Netherlands (Single Top 100) | 100 |
| Scotland (OCC) | 4 |
| Slovakia (Rádio Top 100) | 13 |
| Slovenia (SloTop50) | 26 |
| South Africa (EMA) | 6 |
| Sweden Heatseeker (Sverigetopplistan) | 16 |
| Switzerland (Schweizer Hitparade) | 52 |
| UK Singles (OCC) | 6 |

=== Year-end charts ===
| Chart (2016) | Position |
|---|---|
| Italy (FIMI) | 33 |

== Certifications ==
| Region | Certification | Certified units/sales |
|---|---|---|
| Canada (Music Canada) | Gold | 40,000^{‡} |
| Denmark (IFPI Danmark) | Platinum | 90,000^{‡} |
| Italy (FIMI) | 3× Platinum | 150,000^{‡} |
| Netherlands (NVPI) | Gold | 15,000^{‡} |
| New Zealand (RMNZ) | Platinum | 30,000^{‡} |
| Norway (IFPI Norway) | Gold | 20,000^{‡} |
| Poland (ZPAV) | Gold | 25,000^{‡} |
| United Kingdom (BPI) | 3× Platinum | 1,800,000^{‡} |
^{‡} Sales+streaming figures based on certification alone.

== Release history ==
| Region | Date | Label | Format |
|---|---|---|---|
| UK | 3 November 2015 | Atlantic | Digital download |
| UK | 13 November 2015 | Atlantic | CD single |
