= Ain't Got Far to Go =

Single by Jess Glynne

from the album I Cry When I Laugh
- Released: February 26, 2016
- Recorded: 2015
- Genre: Pop; soul
- Length: 3:39
- Label: Atlantic
- Songwriters: Janée Bennett; Knox Brown; Finlay Dow-Smith; Jessica Glynne
- Producers: Starsmith; Knox Brown

Jess Glynne singles chronology
"Take Me Home" (2015)	"Ain't Got Far to Go" (2016)	"Kill the Lights" (2016)

"Ain't Got Far to Go" is a song by English singer and songwriter Jess Glynne. It was written by Glynne along with Janée "Jin Jin" Bennett, Knox Brown, and Finlay "Starsmith" Dow-Smith for her debut studio album, I Cry When I Laugh (2015), while production was helmed by Brown and Dow-Smith. The song was released as the album's sixth single on 26 February 2016. Prior to the single's release, the song charted at number 46 on the Scottish Singles Chart and number 67 on the UK Singles Chart. After the single's release, it peaked at number 45 on the UK Singles Chart.

== Music video ==
An accompanying music video for "Ain't Got Far to Go" was directed by Declan Whitebloom, showing Glynne and her friends enjoying a day in Havana, Cuba. It marked their second collaboration following his work on previous single "Take Me Home." Commenting on the output, Glynne elaborated: "Making this video in Cuba was so fitting, the journey the colours, the people everything was so perfect. We met some amazing people who were so grateful, charming and hard-working and that's what this song is about."

== Track listing ==
Digital download
No.	Title	Length
1.	"Ain't Got Far to Go"	3:39

== Credits and personnel ==
Credits adapted from the liner notes of I Cry When I Laugh.

- Janée "Jin Jin" Bennet – writing, backing vocals
- Knox Brown – writing, production, vocal production, backing vocals, instruments
- Fin "Starsmith" Dow-Smith – writing, production, vocal production, instruments
- Serban Ghenea – mixing
- Jess Glynne – writing, lead vocals
- John Hanes – mix engineering
- Stuart Hawkes – mastering
- Liam Nolan – vocals engineering
- James Wyatt – strings, arrangement

== Charts ==
=== Weekly charts ===
Chart (2015–16)	Peak position
Belgium (Ultratip Bubbling Under Flanders)	36
Hungary (Rádiós Top 40)	11
Netherlands (Dutch Top 40 Tipparade)	7
Scotland Singles (OCC)	24
UK Singles (OCC)	45

=== Year-end charts ===
Chart (2016)	Position
Hungary (Rádiós Top 40)	70

== Certifications ==
Region	Certification	Certified units/sales
United Kingdom (BPI)	Silver	200,000^{‡}
^{‡} Sales+streaming figures based on certification alone.

== Release history ==
Region	Date	Label	Format
United Kingdom	14 February 2016	Atlantic	Digital download (Tough Love Remix)
United Kingdom	26 February 2016	Atlantic	Digital download
