= Right Here (Jess Glynne song) =

Single by Jess Glynne

from the album I Cry When I Laugh
- Released: 6 July 2014
- Genre: Deep house; UK garage
- Length: 3:40
- Label: WMG; Atlantic
- Songwriters: Jan-ai El-Goni; Kye Gibbon; Jessica Glynne; Matthew Robson-Scott
- Producers: Gorgon City; Bless Beats

Jess Glynne singles chronology
| "My Love" (2014) | "Right Here" (2014) | "Real Love" (2014) |

"Right Here" is a song by English singer and songwriter Jess Glynne. It was written by Glynne, Jan-ai El-Goni and Matthew Robson-Scott and Kye Gibbon from electronic music duo Gorgon City, while production was handled by the latter. Inspired by 1990s dance music, the mid-tempo song fuses pop, soul and deep house. Lyrically, Glynne describes her deep satisfaction with her love life, currently having found her beloved.

It is Glynne's first solo single, following collaborations with Clean Bandit and Route 94. It was released as a digital download on 6 July 2014 in the United Kingdom.

== Background and composition ==
"Right Here" was written by Matthew Robson-Scott, Kye Gibbon, Jan-ai El-Goni and Glynne, while production was handled by Robson-Scott and Gibbon under the duo's stage name Gorgon City. Co-production came from Gareth "Bless Beats" Keane. Wez Clarke mixed and programmed the track, while Jeremy Cooper assisted in the editing of "Right Here". Glynne had worked with garage band during the early stages of writing I Cry When I Laugh, a collaboration that was arranged by her publisher, who also manages Robson-Scott and Gibbon. However, after finishing an early draft of "Right Here", it was soon "put to bed" and the team "didn't really discuss it any further". It was not until Glynne had released her collaborations with Clean Bandit, the singles "Rather Be" and "Real Love", when the song came about again, and "people started to hear and loved It". A deep house track with UK garage elements, Glynne has described it as "quite different compared to what I Cry When I Laugh sounds like".

Musically, "Right Here" is a midtempo track that fuses pop, soul, and electronic music. It is heavily influenced by the 1990s dance music, and contains elements of deep house, funk, and the UK garage genre. The song is built on a heavy laid-back programmed drumbeat. Additional instrumentation includes a horn section, and a deep driving bassline.

== Critical reception ==
Jon O'Brien from Yahoo! felt that "Right Here" was "a little more low-key than her recent collaborations, although its addictive thick bassline and subtle bursts of brass ensure that it still stands out from the increasingly popular deep house crowd." Robin Murray, writing for the Clash magazine, called the song "a stunning introduction, one that feels like a hit in waiting."

== Release and performance ==
"Right Here" was released as a digital download on 6 June 2014 in the United Kingdom. On her decision to release the song as her first solo effort following the success of collaboration singles "My Love" and "Rather Be", Glynne commented that "it was the perfect song to put out and kinda show where I'm going and where I've been, it was the perfect connecting song because, predominantly I'm not a dance artist [...] I love soul, I love R&B, I love hip-hop, I love pop and so that's the kind of stuff I've been creating and "Right Here" is really me and really different."

== Music video ==
A music video to accompany the release of "Right Here" was first released onto YouTube on 19 June 2014 at a total length of three minutes and forty-seven seconds.

== Track listing ==
Digital download – single
| No. | Title | Length |
|---|---|---|
| 1. | "Right Here" | 3:40 |

Digital download – EP
| No. | Title | Length |
|---|---|---|
| 1. | "Right Here" (Skreamix) | 8:40 |
| 2. | "Right Here" (TIEKS Remix) | 5:37 |
| 3. | "Right Here" (Perplexus Remix) | 4:09 |

Notes

- Skream also created an "Epic Mix" of the song which didn't feature on the extended play.
- An official remix by drum and bass producer TC was released for free download.

== Credits and personnel ==
Credits adapted from the liner notes of I Cry When I Laugh.

- Bless Beats — co-production
- Wez Clarke — mixing, programming
- Jeremy Cooper — editing
- Jan-Ai El-Goni — vocals, lyrics
- Kye Gibbon — production, lyrics
- Lewis Hopkin — mastering
- Matthew Robson-Scott — production, lyrics

Mark Allaway - Engineer, mixer, producer

== Charts and certifications ==
=== Weekly charts ===
| Chart (2014) | Peak position |
|---|---|
| Australia (ARIA) | 67 |
| Belgium (Ultratip Bubbling Under Flanders) | 9 |
| Belgium Dance (Ultratop Flanders) | 13 |
| Belgium (Ultratip Bubbling Under Wallonia) | 20 |
| Belgium Dance (Ultratop Wallonia) | 34 |
| Germany (Media Control Charts) | 25 |
| Hungary (Single Top 40) | 37 |
| Ireland (IRMA) | 57 |
| Netherlands (Dutch Top 40 Tipparade) | 12 |
| Poland (Polish Airplay Top 100) | 18 |
| Poland (Dance Top 50) | 21 |
| Romania (Airplay 100) | 52 |
| Scotland Singles (OCC) | 6 |
| Switzerland (Schweizer Hitparade) | 23 |
| UK Dance (OCC) | 1 |
| UK Singles (OCC) | 6 |

=== Year-end charts ===
| Chart (2014) | Rank |
|---|---|
| UK Singles (Official Charts Company) | 65 |

=== Certifications ===
| Region | Certification | Certified units/sales |
|---|---|---|
| United Kingdom (BPI) | Platinum | 600,000^{‡} |
^{‡} Sales+streaming figures based on certification alone.

== Release history ==
| Region | Date | Format | Label |
|---|---|---|---|
| United Kingdom | 6 July 2014 | Digital download | WMG; Atlantic |
| Italy | 18 July 2014 | Contemporary hit radio | WMG; Atlantic |
| Austria | 5 September 2014 | CD; digital download | WMG; Atlantic |
| Germany | 5 September 2014 | CD; digital download | WMG; Atlantic |
| Switzerland | 5 September 2014 | CD; digital download | WMG; Atlantic |
