= I Cry When I Laugh =

Studio album by Jess Glynne
- Released: 21 August 2015
- Recorded: 2013–2015
- Genres: Pop; dance; R&B
- Length: 49:52
- Labels: Atlantic; Warner
- Producers: Starsmith; Knox Brown; Big Shizz; Bless Beats; Clean Bandit; Gorgon City; Rowan Jones; Naughty Boy; Jack Patterson; The Six; Steve Mac; TMS

Jess Glynne chronology
I Cry When I Laugh (2015)	Always In Between (2018)

Singles from I Cry When I Laugh
- 1. "Right Here" Released: 6 July 2014; 2. "Real Love" Released: 16 November 2014; 3. "Hold My Hand" Released: 22 March 2015; 4. "Don't Be So Hard on Yourself" Released: 14 August 2015; 5. "Take Me Home" Released: 3 November 2015; 6. "Ain't Got Far to Go" Released: 26 February 2016

I Cry When I Laugh is the debut studio album by British singer Jess Glynne. It was released on 21 August 2015 in the United Kingdom and 11 September 2015 in the United States by Atlantic Records and Warner Music Group. I Cry When I Laugh was recorded over three years, with Glynne working with several record producers on it.

Upon release, the album received mixed reviews from music critics, but had a positive commercial performance, with it peaking at number one in the United Kingdom, and reaching the top ten in Australia, the Netherlands, Ireland, and Italy. In the United States, the album peaked at number 25 on the Billboard 200, where it spent 12 weeks on the chart.

The album was preceded by the UK top-ten singles "Right Here" and "Real Love", as well as the UK number-one singles "Hold My Hand" and "Don't Be So Hard on Yourself". The album's fifth single, "Take Me Home", was released on 3 November 2015 as the official BBC Children in Need single of 2015. The deluxe edition also includes the collaborative singles "Rather Be" (with Clean Bandit), "My Love" (with Route 94) and "Not Letting Go" (with Tinie Tempah), all of which reached number one in the UK. The album was also promoted with the Ain't Got Far to Go Tour, lasting from September to November 2015 with concerts taking place in both North America and the United Kingdom.

== Background ==
In August 2013, the singer signed a contract with Atlantic Records, consequently leaving her job at the time in brand management for a drinks company. The same year, deep house producer Route 94 approached Glynne about rewriting and providing vocals for a song of his, called "My Love", which at the time contained a sample that he was prohibited from using. It was released on DJ Annie Mac's compilation album Annie Mac Presents in October 2013 and led to Glynne’s discovery by British electronic group Clean Bandit who approached her to feature on their song "Rather Be". Released as a single in January 2014, "Rather Be" debuted at number one on the UK Singles Chart, becoming the third fastest-selling single and the most streamed song of 2014. The track attained number-one and top-five positions on charts across Europe and Oceania, and was a top ten hit on the US Billboard Hot 100. In February 2014, Route 94's "My Love" was released as a single; it also debuted at number one in the UK. Prior to writing the songs for the album, Glynne had broken up with her girlfriend.

== Critical reception ==
Professional ratings
Aggregate scores
Source	Rating
Metacritic	53/100
Review scores
Source	Rating
Boston Globe	(favourable)
Digital Spy	5/5 stars
Evening Standard	3/5 stars
The Guardian	2/5 stars
The Independent	3/5 stars
musicOMH	3/5 stars
Spin	5/10 stars

I Cry When I Laugh received mixed reviews from music critics. On Metacritic, which assigns a rated mean out of 100 from mainstream critics, it currently holds a score of 53, based on six reviews, indicating "mixed or average reviews". The Independent writer Andy Gill found that Glynne's "recent chart-topper "Hold My Hand" provides a fairly accurate template for her debut album, as regards both methods and themes. It’s a record of heartbreak cauterised by hope, so alongside the routine tears and recrimination is a recurrent element of recovery and optimism that sets it apart from most other soul-diva offerings." John Aizlewood from Evening Standard wrote that "it’s a relentless listen, probably best served in single exhilarating portions rather than as a whole, but the kitchen sink production on "Don’t Be So Hard on Yourself" is a windswept delight and bold is always more fun than mealy-mouthed". Digital Spy called I Cry When I Laugh a "mix of emotions, blending heartbroken lyrics with uplifting melodies. The overall formula isn't particularly forward-thinking, neither is it pushing the fringes of pop, but somehow it comes across as strikingly distinct I Cry When I Laugh is [...] an accomplished and uplifting debut album."

Paul MacInnes from The Guardian rated the album two out of five stars and wrote that "Glynne is now being launched in her own right, with this lengthy collection intended to showcase her talents. It’s unclear quite what those are, however – not so much because Glynne lacks a distinctive voice, but more because the variety of producers and arrangements here mean it’s difficult to tell quite what her thing is." Similarly, musicOMH's Andy Baber felt that "I Cry When I Laugh never really manages to become more than just a collection of singles. Admittedly, the singles are all of the highest quality [...] but there is no getting away from the fact that the album as a whole is rather underwhelming. It is great as something to dip in and out of, but I Cry When I Laugh is proof that Glynne is far from the finished article." Hazel Cills, writing for Spin magazine, added that while "you’ve probably heard Glynne’s voice before you even knew who the English singer was, you might not know who she is even after hearing her debut record." She felt that the album was plagued by "scatterbrained production", "neck-deep clichés", and "relentless self-help tracks, all of which begin to blend together."

Despite the mixed reception, I Cry When I Laugh was named the 16th and 10th best pop album of 2015 by Rolling Stone and Entertainment Weekly, respectively. The New York Observer placed the album at number 5 in their list of best debut albums of 2015.

== Commercial performance ==
I Cry When I Laugh debuted at number one on the UK Albums Chart with combined sales of just under 60,000, giving Glynne the second fastest-selling debut album of 2015 behind James Bay's Chaos and the Calm. The album has reached the top 10 in the Republic of Ireland, Australia, Italy and the Netherlands. It has also peaked at number 25 on the US Billboard 200.

The album had been certified Platinum by the British Phonographic Industry (BPI) for sales of over 300,000 copies and sold 583,000 copies in the UK during 2015. It has since been certified 5× Platinum for sales of over 1,500,000 copies. The album also received the gold certification by RIAA for sales over 500,000 copies in the United States.

== Singles ==
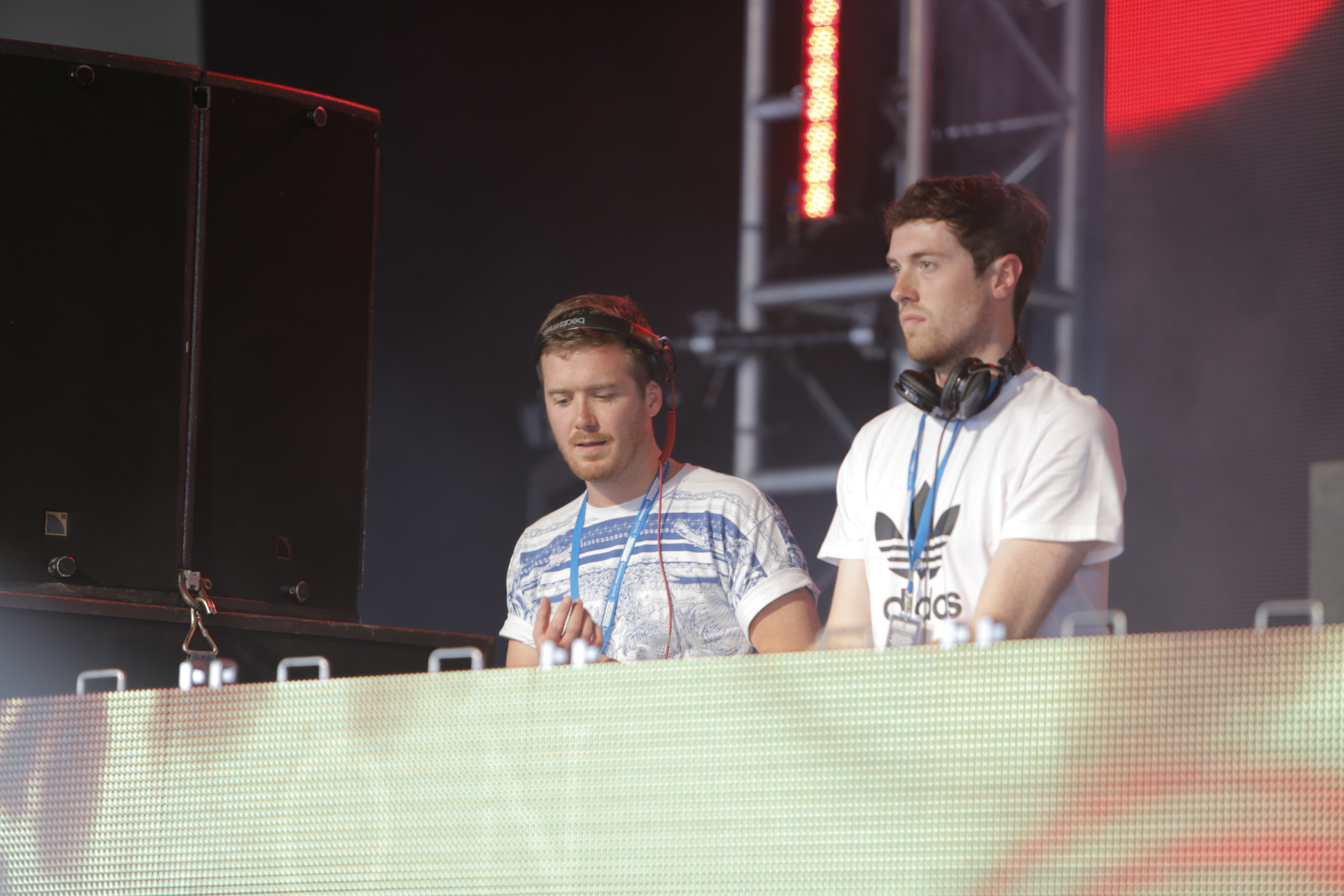
Critics praised the collaboration between Glynne and Gorgon City on the lead single, "Right Here".

Selected as the first single from I Cry When I Laugh, "Right Here" was released on 6 July 2014. It received a positive from critics who called it "a little more low-key" than Glynne's previous collaborations on Clean Bandit's "Rather Be" and Route 94's "My Love", both of which had reached the top of the UK Singles Chart in early 2014. The song peaked at number six on the UK Singles Chart and reached the top ten in Belgium and Scotland. It was eventually certified silver by the British Phonographic Industry (BPI). "Real Love", another collaboration with Clean Bandit, was released as the second single on 16 November 2014. It reached number two on the UK Singles Chart and peaked at number two on the German Singles Chart.

"Hold My Hand" was released as the album's third single on 22 March 2015. The song debuted at number one in the United Kingdom, where it became Glynne's first solo number one. While it charted within the top twenty on most charts in appeared on, "Hold My Hand" also peaked at the top position in Belgium and Scotland. "Don't Be So Hard on Yourself" was released as the fourth single to precede I Cry When I Laugh. Released on 14 August 2015, it gave Glynne her fifth number-one single following the number-one success of her Tinie Tempah collaboration "Not Letting Go", making her the second British female solo artist to do this after Cheryl Cole, overtaking then current record sharers Geri Halliwell and Rita Ora. A music video for "Take Me Home", the album's sixth single, was released on 30 October 2015 on Glynne's official Facebook page. The song is also the official BBC Children in Need 2015 single. "Ain't Got Far to Go" was released as the album's sixth single on 4 January 2016.

=== Other songs ===
- "Rather Be" was released on 17 January 2014 as a single from Clean Bandit's debut album, New Eyes. The song reached number one on the UK Singles Chart and was the second best-selling song of 2014.
- "My Love" is Route 94's debut single. It was released on 28 February 2014 and reached number one on the UK Singles Chart. "My Love" (Acoustic) was made available to download on 27 May 2015.
- "Not Letting Go" was released on 19 June 2015 as the first single from Tinie Tempah's third studio album, Youth. The single debuted at number one on the UK Singles Chart, becoming Glynne's fourth number one.
- "Why Me" was made available to download on 31 July 2015.

== Promotion ==
=== Tour ===
Glynne went on her Ain't Got Far to Go Tour across the United States and United Kingdom which started on 14 September 2015 and ended on 11 November 2015.

Tour dates
Tour dates
Date	City	Country	Venue
North America
14 September 2015	Washington, D.C.	United States	U Street Music Hall
15 September 2015	Boston, Massachusetts	United States	Brighton Music Hall
17 September 2015	New York City, New York	United States	Bowery Ballroom
19 September 2015	Montreal, Quebec	Canada	Le Belmont
21 September 2015	Toronto, Ontario	Canada	Adelaide Hall
23 September 2015	Chicago, Illinois	United States	Subterranean
24 September 2015	Minneapolis, Minnesota	United States	Fine Line Music Cafe
26 September 2015	Seattle, Washington	United States	Barboza
27 September 2015	Portland, Oregon	United States	Doug Fir Lounge
29 September 2015	San Francisco, California	United States	The Independent
30 September 2015	West Hollywood, California	United States	Troubadour
United Kingdom
31 October 2015	Cardiff	Wales	The Great Hall
1 November 2015	Birmingham	England	O2 Academy Birmingham
2 November 2015	Nottingham	England	Rock City
4 November 2015	London	England	The Roundhouse
5 November 2015	Bournemouth	England	O2 Academy Bournemouth
6 November 2015	Glasgow	Scotland	O2 Academy Glasgow
10 November 2015	Newcastle	England	O2 Academy Newcastle
11 November 2015	Manchester	England	Academy Manchester

=== Live performances ===
On 23 May 2015, Glynne performed at Radio 1's Big Weekend 2015, where she sang "Ain't Got Far to Go", "Right Here", "Real Love", "Gave Me Something", "My Love", "Rather Be", "Don't Be So Hard on Yourself", "Not Letting Go" with Tinie Tempah and "Hold My Hand".

On 28 May 2016 she performed at Radio 1's Big Weekend 2016. She played "Don't Be So Hard on Yourself", "Rather Be", "Ain't Got Far to Go", "My Love", "Take Me Home", "Right Here" and "Hold My Hand".

She also performed at Glastonbury in 2016 where she sang "Don't Be So Hard on Yourself", "Rather Be", "No Rights No Wrongs", "Gave Me Something", "Not Letting Go", "My Love", "Ain't Got Far to Go", "Love Me", "Right Here", "Why Me", "Take Me Home", "You Can Find Me", "I Feel For You" and "Hold My Hand".

== Track listing ==
I Cry When I Laugh – UK and Irish standard edition
No.	Title	Writer(s)	Producer(s)	Length
1.	"Strawberry Fields (Intro)"	Jessica Glynne; Knox Brown	Knox Brown	1:21
2.	"Gave Me Something"	Glynne; Brown; Fin Dow-Smith; Janée "Jin Jin" Bennett	Starsmith; Brown	3:27
3.	"Hold My Hand"	Glynne; Bennett; Jack Patterson; Ina Wroldsen	Starsmith; Patterson^{[a]}	3:47
4.	"Real Love" (with Clean Bandit)	Glynne; Bennett; Patterson; Grace Chatto; Robert Harvey; Richard Boardman; Cleo Tighe; Sarah Blanchard	Clean Bandit; Starsmith^{[a]}; The Six^{[c]}	3:55
5.	"Ain't Got Far to Go"	Glynne; Brown; Bennett; Dow-Smith	Starsmith; Brown	3:23
6.	"Take Me Home"	Glynne; Steve Mac; Wayne Hector; Nick Tsang	Steve Mac	4:25
7.	"Don't Be So Hard on Yourself"	Glynne; Hector; Tom Barnes; Pete Kelleher; Ben Kohn	TMS	3:31
8.	"You Can Find Me"	Glynne; Talay Riley; Dow-Smith	Starsmith	3:27
9.	"Why Me"	Glynne; Brown	Knox Brown	3:31
10.	"Love Me"	Glynne; Brown; Bennett	Knox Brown	3:37
11.	"It Ain't Right"	Glynne; Dow-Smith; James Newman	Starsmith	4:01
12.	"No Rights No Wrongs"	Glynne; Brown; Bennett; Dow-Smith; Jonny Coffer; Newman	Brown; Starsmith	4:02
13.	"Saddest Vanilla" (featuring Emeli Sandé)	Glynne; Emeli Sandé; Shahid Khan	Naughty Boy	4:01
14.	"Right Here"	Glynne; Matthew Robson-Scott; Kye Gibbon; Bennett	Gorgon City	3:40
Total length:				49:52

I Cry When I Laugh – UK and Irish deluxe edition (bonus tracks)
No.	Title	Writer(s)	Producer(s)	Length
15.	"Home"	Glynne; Bennett; Bless Beats	Bless Beats	3:39
16.	"Bad Blood"	Glynne; Bennett; Bless Beats; Big Shizz	Bless Beats; Big Shizz	3:09
17.	"My Love" (acoustic)	Glynne; Mac; Rowan Jones	Mac	3:02
18.	"Not Letting Go" (Tinie Tempah featuring Jess Glynne)	Glynne; Patrick Okogwu; Jermaine Jackson; Bless Beats; Bennett; Krishane Murray; Lewis Jankel	Bless Beats; Shift K3Y^{[b]}	3:51
19.	"Rather Be" (Clean Bandit featuring Jess Glynne)	Patterson; James Napier; Nicole Marshall; Chatto	Chatto; Patterson	3:47
20.	"My Love" (Route 94 featuring Jess Glynne)	Glynne; Jones	Jones	4:22
Total length:				71:42

I Cry When I Laugh – North American edition
No.	Title	Writer(s)	Producer(s)	Length
1.	"Gave Me Something"	Glynne; Brown; Smith; Bennett	Starsmith; Brown	3:27
2.	"Hold My Hand"	Glynne; Bennett; Patterson; Wroldsen	Starsmith; Patterson^{[a]}	3:47
3.	"Ain't Got Far to Go"	Glynne; Brown; Bennett; Dow-Smith	Starsmith; Knox Brown	3:23
4.	"Take Me Home"	Glynne; Mac; Hector; Tsang	Mac	4:25
5.	"Don't Be So Hard on Yourself"	Glynne; Hector; Barnes; Kelleher; Kohn	TMS	3:31
6.	"No Rights No Wrongs"	Glynne; Brown; Bennett; Dow-Smith; Coffer; Newman	Brown; Starsmith	4:02
7.	"You Can Find Me"	Glynne; Riley; Dow-Smith	Starsmith	3:27
8.	"My Love" (acoustic)	Glynne; Mac; Jones	Mac	3:02
9.	"Rather Be" (Clean Bandit featuring Jess Glynne)	Patterson; Napier; Marshall; Chatto	Chatto; Patterson	3:47
10.	"Saddest Vanilla" (featuring Emeli Sandé)	Glynne; Sandé; Khan	Naughty Boy	4:01
11.	"Why Me"	Glynne; Brown	Brown	3:31
Total length:				40:23

I Cry When I Laugh – International edition
No.	Title	Writer(s)	Producer(s)	Length
12.	"Real Love" (with Clean Bandit)	Glynne; Bennett; Patterson; Chatto; Harvery; Boardman; Tighe; Blanchard	Clean Bandit; Starsmith^{[a]}; The Six^{[c]}	3:39
13.	"Not Letting Go" (Tinie Tempah featuring Jess Glynne)	Glynne; Okogwu; Jackson; Bless Beats; Bennett; Murray; Jankel	Bless Beats; Shift K3Y^{[b]}	3:51
Total length:				47:53

I Cry When I Laugh – Japanese edition
No.	Title	Writer(s)	Producer(s)	Length
14.	"It Ain't Right"	Glynne; Dow-Smith; Newman	Starsmith	4:01
15.	"Right Here"	Glynne; Robson-Scott; Gibbon; Bennett	Gorgon City	3:40
16.	"My Love" (Route 94 featuring Jess Glynne)	Glynne; Jones	Jones	4:22
Total length:				59:56

Notes

- ^{^[a]} signifies a co-producer
- ^{^[b]} signifies an additional producer
- ^{^[c]} signifies an original producer
- The deluxe edition is repackaged into a digipak

== Charts ==
=== Weekly charts ===
Weekly chart performance for I Cry When I Laugh
Chart (2015–2016)	Peak position
Australian Albums (ARIA)	7
Austrian Albums (Ö3 Austria)	46
Belgian Albums (Ultratop Flanders)	22
Belgian Albums (Ultratop Wallonia)	63
Canadian Albums (Billboard)	84
Dutch Albums (Album Top 100)	6
French Albums (SNEP)	106
German Albums (Offizielle Top 100)	27
Hungarian Albums (MAHASZ)	26
Irish Albums (IRMA)	3
Italian Albums (FIMI)	10
Japanese Albums (Oricon)	63
New Zealand Albums (RMNZ)	36
Polish Albums (ZPAV)	34
Scottish Albums (Official Charts)	1
Spanish Albums (Promusicae)	63
Swiss Albums (Schweizer Hitparade)	12
UK Albums (Official Charts)	1
US Billboard 200	25

=== Year-end charts ===
Year-end chart performance for I Cry When I Laugh
Chart	Year	Position
UK Albums (OCC)	2015	7
UK Albums (OCC)	2016	9
UK Albums (OCC)	2017	75
UK Albums (OCC)	2018	53
UK Albums (OCC)	2019	64
UK Albums (OCC)	2020	88
UK Albums (OCC)	2021	95

=== Decade-end charts ===
Decade-end chart performance for I Cry When I Laugh
Chart (2010–2019)	Position
UK Albums (OCC)	29

== Certifications ==
Certifications for I Cry When I Laugh
Region	Certification	Certified units/sales
Canada (Music Canada)	Gold	40,000^{‡}
Denmark (IFPI Danmark)	Gold	10,000^{‡}
Italy (FIMI)	Gold	25,000^{‡}
New Zealand (RMNZ)	Platinum	15,000^{‡}
United Kingdom (BPI)	5× Platinum	1,500,000^{‡}
United States (RIAA)	Gold	500,000^{‡}
^{‡} Sales+streaming figures based on certification alone.

== Release history ==
Release history and formats for I Cry When I Laugh
Region	Date	Format(s)	Edition(s)	Label	Ref.
Ireland	21 August 2015	CD; digital download	Standard; deluxe	Atlantic; Warner	
United Kingdom	21 August 2015	CD; digital download	Standard; deluxe	Atlantic; Warner	
Canada	11 September 2015	CD; digital download	Standard	Atlantic; Warner	
United States	11 September 2015	CD; digital download	Standard	Atlantic; Warner	
Australia	18 September 2015	CD; digital download	Standard	Atlantic; Warner	
Germany	16 October 2015	CD; digital download	Standard	Atlantic; Warner	
France	23 October 2015	CD; digital download	Standard	Atlantic; Warner	

== See also ==
- List of 2015 albums
- List of albums which have spent the most weeks on the UK Albums Chart
- List of UK Albums Chart number ones of the 2010s
