= Real Love (Clean Bandit and Jess Glynne song) =

2014 single by Clean Bandit

Single by Clean Bandit and Jess Glynne

from the album New Eyes (Special edition) and I Cry When I Laugh
- Released: 16 November 2014
- Genre: EDM; house; disco
- Length: 3:39
- Label: Atlantic; Warner
- Songwriters: Richard Boardman; Robert Harvey; Sarah Blanchard; Jessica Glynne; Janée Bennett; Jack Patterson; Grace Chatto
- Producers: Clean Bandit; Starsmith; The Six

Clean Bandit singles chronology
"Come Over" (2014)	"Real Love" (2014)	"Stronger" (2015)

Jess Glynne singles chronology
"Right Here" (2014)	"Real Love" (2014)	"Hold My Hand" (2015)

Music video
- "Real Love" on YouTube

"Real Love" is a song by English electronic group Clean Bandit and English singer and songwriter Jess Glynne. It was released on 16 November 2014 as a joint single, taken from the special edition of the group's album New Eyes and Glynne's album I Cry When I Laugh. The two previously collaborated on "Rather Be". "Real Love" reached number one in Israel and number two in the United Kingdom and Germany.

== Background ==
After the huge success of Clean Bandit's song "Rather Be", which Glynne featured on, they decided to collaborate again after the writing collective The Six presented them with "Real Love". It was released on 16 November 2014 as a digital download.

== Commercial performance ==
On the UK Singles Chart, the song debuted at number two, becoming Clean Bandit's third UK top 10 hit and Glynne's fourth. As of November 2016, its UK sales stand at over 682,000. The song made the top 40 in several European countries, managing to reach a height of number two in Germany. It also reached number 13 in Australia. In 2015, it was released on US dance radio and peaked at number 20 on the Dance Club Songs chart.

== Music video ==
The music video was made by Clean Bandit and features some of their fans kissing, interspersed with clips of Clean Bandit and Glynne performing the song in a studio and in concert. The video was released on 20 October 2014 and has since then received nearly 80 million views on YouTube as of March 2018.

== Cover versions ==
- In 2015, Lower Than Atlantis released a Live Lounge performance of the song on the 2015 reissue of their self-titled album. For a short time, a bootleg from producer 5erg was released on iTunes without permission from Clean Bandit. It was later taken down.

== Track listing ==
Digital download – single
No.	Title	Length
1.	"Real Love"	3:39

Digital download – EP
No.	Title	Length
1.	"Real Love" (Tough Love Remix)	5:38
2.	"Real Love" (Henry Krinkle Remix)	4:59
3.	"Real Love" (DJ S.K.T Remix)	5:07
4.	"Real Love" (Extended)	5:00

== Charts ==
=== Weekly charts ===
Chart (2014–15)	Peak position
Australia (ARIA)	13
Austria (Ö3 Austria Top 40)	22
Belgium (Ultratip Bubbling Under Flanders)	9
Belgium Dance (Ultratop Flanders)	16
Belgium (Ultratip Bubbling Under Wallonia)	12
Belgium Dance (Ultratop Wallonia)	18
Brazil (Billboard Hot 100)	70
France (SNEP)	131
Germany (GfK)	2
Hungary (Dance Top 40)	22
Hungary (Rádiós Top 40)	36
Ireland (IRMA)	26
Israel International Airplay (Media Forest)	1
Italy (FIMI)	53
Mexico (Billboard Mexican Airplay)	23
Mexico Anglo (Monitor Latino)	15
New Zealand (Recorded Music NZ)	35
Poland Dance (ZPAV)	19
Scotland Singles (Official Charts)	3
Slovenia (SloTop50)	32
Switzerland (Schweizer Hitparade)	37
UK Singles (Official Charts)	2
UK Dance (Official Charts)	1
US Hot Dance/Electronic Songs (Billboard)	18
US Dance Club Songs (Billboard)	20

=== Year-end charts ===
Chart (2014)	Position
UK Singles (Official Charts Company)	89

Chart (2015)	Position
Hungary (Dance Top 40)	75
UK Singles (Official Charts Company)	80
US Hot Dance/Electronic Songs (Billboard)	65

== Certifications ==
Region	Certification	Certified units/sales
Australia (ARIA)	Platinum	70,000^{^}
Italy (FIMI)	Gold	25,000^{‡}
New Zealand (RMNZ)	Gold	15,000^{‡}
United Kingdom (BPI)	Platinum	689,508
^{^} Shipments figures based on certification alone.^{‡} Sales+streaming figures based on certification alone.

== Release history ==
Region	Date	Format	Label
Italy	3 October 2014	Contemporary hit radio	Warner
United Kingdom	16 November 2014	Digital download	Atlantic; Warner
United States	27 January 2015	Dance radio	Big Beat
