= Route 94 (musician) =

English record producer (born 1993)

- Also known as: Dream
- Born: Rowan Tyler Jones; 21 May 1993 (age 33)
- Origin: Richmond, London, England
- Genres: Deep house; tech house; dubstep
- Occupations: Record producer; remixer
- Years active: 2013–present
- Labels: Routine; Defected; Crosstown Rebels; Hot Creations; Rinse; Owsla; Weapons; H.E.N.C.H; Heavy Artillery; X147; Bassclash; Prime Audio
- Website: www.route94.co.uk

Rowan Tyler Jones (born 21 May 1993), known by his stage name Route 94, is an English record producer and remixer from Richmond, London. Initially producing dubstep as Dream, Jones worked with the likes of Skream, Benga and Katy B. He then began producing house music. His single "My Love" was a commercial success, reaching number one in three charts.

== Music career ==
=== 2010–2012: Dream and early career ===
In 2010, Jones began to produce dubstep as Dream. Three of his songs were uploaded by UKF Dubstep, and his songs were supported by several big names including Chase & Status and Skrillex who released the Dream EP This Isn't House on his label Owsla.

=== 2012–present: Route 94 and commercial breakthrough ===
On 26 July 2012, Jones created social network accounts under the name Route 94 after getting his dubplates played on Skream and Benga's Radio 1 show. He explained that the moniker Route 94 came from the name of the road that runs from Chicago to Detroit, which is the birthplace of house and techno music. The Dream accounts were subsequently deleted at the time. He denied rumours of being Dream, using simply a logo and not revealing his name or face. This sparked interest from music blogs such as Fact, who made guesses as to his identity. It has since emerged that they are the same person; Jones has revealed the face of Route 94 and has been credited on albums. Throughout 2013 he produced remixes for Katy B, Skream, Storm Queen and an unreleased remix for Example as well as co-producing "Smile" from Benga's third studio album Chapter II, which featured vocals from Charli XCX.

The debut EP under the new alias, titled Fly 4 Life, was released on 17 June 2013 on his eponymous record label. He later signed to Rinse. In September 2013, BBC Radio 1 and BBC Radio 1Xtra began to play his debut single "My Love", featuring Jess Glynne. MistaJam added it to his Inbox:Fresh feature and it featured on Annie Mac's 2013 mix compilation. Its release date was announced as 2 March 2014, and it became added to Radio 1's A List for frequent airplay. Jones produced "Everything", a track from Katy B's second studio album, Little Red.

Glynne found her commercial breakthrough in 2014 with the Clean Bandit song "Rather Be", which topped the UK Singles Chart. This helped "My Love" gain exposure, and the song topped the UK Singles Chart, UK Dance Chart and Scottish Singles Chart upon entering the charts.

Following the success of "My Love", Jones released his second Route 94 EP Misunderstood on 23 July 2014.

== Discography ==
=== Extended plays ===
Title	EP details
Come On (as Dream)	Released: 31 January 2011; Label: Bassclash; Format: Digital download
Go Hard / Most High (as Dream)	Released: 22 September 2011; Self-released; Format: Free digital download
I Am Dream (as Dream)	Released: 13 October 2011; Label: X147 / Heavy Artillery; Format: Digital download
This Isn't House (as Dream)	Released: 31 July 2012; Label: Owsla; Format: Digital download
Fly 4 Life	Released: 17 June 2013; Label: Route 94 Records; Format: Digital download
Misunderstood	Released: 23 July 2014; Label: Leftroom Records; Format: Digital download
A Brand New Day	Released: 7 June 2016; Label: Fabric; Format: Free digital download
Mind, Body & Soul	Released: 31 March 2017; Label: Crosstown Rebels; Format: Digital download
House & Pressure	Released: 9 June 2017; Label: Hot Creations; Format: Digital download

=== Singles ===
==== As lead artist ====
Year	Title	Peak chart positions										Certifications	Album
Year	Title	UK	AUS	BEL (FL)	FRA	GER	IRE	NLD	NZ	SCO	SWI	Certifications	Album
2014	"My Love" (Note: "My Love" also features on the deluxe edition of Jess Glynne's debut studio album I Cry When I Laugh.) (featuring Jess Glynne)	1	18	4	35	6	12	9	38	1	21	BPI: 3× Platinum; ARIA: Platinum; RMNZ: Platinum	Non-album singles
2019	"Forget the Girl"	—	—	—	—	—	—	—	—	—	—		Non-album singles
2019	"Fever" (featuring Eda Eren)	—	—	—	—	—	—	—	—	—	—		Non-album singles
2019	"Bada / HT Conundrum"	—	—	—	—	—	—	—	—	—	—		Non-album singles
2019	"Close"	—	—	—	—	—	—	—	—	—	—		Non-album singles
2019	"Pre Mexico Pill" / "Straight Up"	—	—	—	—	—	—	—	—	—	—		Non-album singles
2020	"Sad Songs" (featuring L Devine)	—	—	—	—	—	—	—	—	—	—		Non-album singles
"—" denotes a recording that did not chart or was not released.

==== Promotional singles ====
Year	Title	Label
2011	"Don't Stop" (as Dream)	Self-released
2012	"Pornstar" / "X Rated" (Dream featuring Beezy)	H.E.N.C.H
2012	"Who Cares" (Dream and Archie Cane)	Self-released
2012	"Forget the Girl"	Self-released
2013	"Freak" (with SecondCity)	Self-released

=== Other appearances ===
Year	Song	Release	Label
2013	"Dama Blanca" (Dubfreq featuring Dream)	Dama Blanca EP	Prime Audio

=== Remixes ===
Year	Song	Artist
2011	"Run This Town" (as Dream)	Oh My! featuring OG'z
2011	"This Town is Ours" (as Dream)	Marco Del Horno featuring Emi Green
2011	"Move On" (as Dream)	Vandera
2011	"Take My Breath Away" (as Dream)	Stadium featuring Blue Pearl
2012	"Dubsteppin'" (as Dream)	P Money
2013	"Ms. Jackson" (Route 94 'SMJ' Bootleg)	Outkast
2013	"Jack" (Route 94 Bootleg)	Breach
2013	"5 AM"	Katy B
2013	"Rollercoaster"	Skream featuring Sam Frank
2013	"Look Right Through"	Storm Queen
2013	"Always"	MK featuring Alana
2015	"Perfect Picture"	Ali Love
2017	"Back To the Music"	Sooney
2020	"I Want It All"	Casper Cole featuring Elderbrook
2021	"Last Time"	Becky Hill

=== Production credits ===
Year	Title	Artist	Release
2013	"Smile"	Benga (featuring Charli XCX)	Chapter II
2014	"Everything"	Katy B	Little Red
