= My Love (Route 94 song) =

Single by Route 94 featuring Jess Glynne

from the album I Cry When I Laugh (Deluxe edition)
- Released: 28 February 2014
- Recorded: 2013
- Genre: Deep house, Eurodance
- Length: 4:22
- Label: Rinse; 4th & B'way
- Songwriters: Jess Glynne; Rowan Jones
- Producer: Rowan Jones

Route 94 singles chronology
"Freak" (2013)	"My Love" (2014)	"Forget the Girl" (2019)

Jess Glynne singles chronology
"Rather Be" (2014)	"My Love" (2014)	"Right Here" (2014)

Music video
- "My Love" on YouTube

"My Love" is the first single by British DJ and record producer Route 94, featuring vocals by British singer Jess Glynne. It was released in the United Kingdom on 27 January 2014, through Rinse Recordings. The song topped the UK Singles Chart, peaked at number 12 on the Irish Singles Chart and also charted in Belgium. The song was written by Glynne and Route 94, and produced by Route 94.

Glynne's previous single, "Rather Be" with Clean Bandit, topped the UK chart the previous month. The song and an acoustic version appear on the deluxe edition of her album I Cry When I Laugh. The Route 94 version has since become a 3× Platinum record in the UK and the acoustic version has separately received a silver certification.

The song was sampled by rapper Lil Keed on "Proud of Me", featuring Young Thug, released in 2019. The track was also sampled by rapper Yo Gotti on "Fuck Em", which was released in 2015.

== Composition ==
"My Love" is a deep house song heavily influenced by 1990s Eurodance.

== Critical reception ==
Robert Copsey of Digital Spy gave the song a positive review, stating:

"The latest producer-turned-frontman poised to take over the charts seemingly out of nowhere is Route 94; a Rinse FM-signed wonderkid who has shot through the ranks after receiving praise from Radio 1's Annie Mac as well as D'n'B DJs Skream and Benga. What's more, his mysterious alias actually holds meaning: it's the US highway that links Chicago – the home of house music – and Detroit, the birthplace of techno. Naturally, what will almost certainly be his breakthrough hit 'My Love' lands somewhere in the middle on the deep house pH spectrum, its heady piano thuds and gauzy electro glow offset by the radio friendly vocals of Jess Glynne, who featured on Clean Bandit's recent chart topper 'Rather Be'. And while you'd think the latter's recent success would have satisfied the public's appetite for chart-friendly house, we suspect its reign is far from over yet."

== Chart performance ==
The song debuted at number one for one week on the UK Singles Chart, dethroning Pharrell Williams's single "Happy" and also was number one on the UK Dance Chart, dethroning Clean Bandit's single "Rather Be", which also features Glynne, from that position with first-week sales of 120,770. It was also successful in mainland Europe, peaking within the top ten in five other countries, peaking at number two on the Euro Digital Songs chart, behind Pharrell Williams, for one week.

== Music video ==
A music video directed by Ryan Staake to accompany the release of "My Love" was first released onto YouTube on 27 January 2014 at a total length of three minutes and eleven seconds and was filmed in infrared. It follows a young man Richard Harmon as he enters a club, dances with a young woman Genevieve Buechner, leaves with her, they embrace in the rain and later at her house it is implied that they have sex. She then showers and he leaves. Just before the video ends, it turns back to normal colour and the young man is shown walking out in the rain. The video was taken down after more than 363 million views. As of January 2022, the video is now back online.

== Track listing ==
Digital download – single
No.	Title	Length
1.	"My Love" (featuring Jess Glynne)	4:22

Digital download – EP
No.	Title	Length
1.	"My Love" (Sigma remix)	4:30
2.	"My Love" (Maison Sky remix)	6:13
3.	"My Love" (Billon remix)	4:54
4.	"My Love" (Royal-T remix)	5:03

German CD single
No.	Title	Length
1.	"My Love"	4:21
2.	"My Love" (Royal-T remix)	5:03

== Charts ==
=== Weekly charts ===
Weekly chart performance for "My Love"
Chart (2014)	Peak position
Australia (ARIA)	18
Austria (Ö3 Austria Top 40)	11
Belgium (Ultratop 50 Flanders)	4
Belgium (Ultratop 50 Wallonia)	9
Czech Republic Airplay (ČNS IFPI)	15
Czech Republic Singles Digital (ČNS IFPI)	20
Euro Digital Song Sales (Billboard)	2
France (SNEP)	35
Germany (GfK)	6
Hungary (Rádiós Top 40)	40
Ireland (IRMA)	12
Luxembourg Digital Song Sales (Billboard)	8
Netherlands (Dutch Top 40)	5
Netherlands (Single Top 100)	9
New Zealand (Recorded Music NZ)	38
Poland Airplay (ZPAV)	7
Poland Dance (ZPAV)	5
Romania (Romanian Top 100)	43
Scottish Singles Sales (Official Charts)	1
Slovakia Airplay (ČNS IFPI)	67
Slovakia Singles Digital (ČNS IFPI)	15
South Africa Airplay (EMA)	5
Sweden (Sverigetopplistan)	43
Switzerland (Schweizer Hitparade)	21
UK Dance (Official Charts)	1
UK Singles (Official Charts)	1
US Hot Dance/Electronic Songs (Billboard)	23

Weekly chart performance for "My Love (2024)"
Chart (2025)	Peak position
Greece International (IFPI)	37

=== Year-end charts ===
Chart (2014)	Position
Belgium (Ultratop Flanders)	25
Belgium (Ultratop Wallonia)	53
France (SNEP)	153
Germany (Official German Charts)	30
Netherlands (Dutch Top 40)	22
Netherlands (Single Top 100)	50
Poland (ZPAV)	18
UK Singles (Official Charts Company)	16
US Hot Dance/Electronic Songs (Billboard)	59

== Certifications ==
Region	Certification	Certified units/sales
Australia (ARIA)	Platinum	70,000^{^}
Belgium (BRMA)	Gold	15,000^{*}
Brazil (Pro-Música Brasil)	Platinum	60,000^{‡}
Denmark (IFPI Danmark)	Platinum	90,000^{‡}
Germany (BVMI)	Platinum	300,000^{‡}
Italy (FIMI)	Gold	15,000^{‡}
New Zealand (RMNZ)	2× Platinum	60,000^{‡}
Sweden (GLF)	Platinum	40,000^{‡}
United Kingdom (BPI)	3× Platinum	1,800,000^{‡}
Streaming
Denmark (IFPI Danmark)	Gold	1,300,000^{†}
Greece (IFPI Greece) 2024 version	Gold	1,000,000^{†}
^{*} Sales figures based on certification alone.^{^} Shipments figures based on certification alone.^{‡} Sales+streaming figures based on certification alone.^{†} Streaming-only figures based on certification alone.

== Release history ==
Region	Date	Format	Label
United Kingdom	28 February 2014	Digital download	Rinse
United States	14 April 2014	Dance radio	4th & B'way
