= Rather Be =

2014 single by Clean Bandit feat Jess Glynne

Single by Clean Bandit featuring Jess Glynne

from the album New Eyes
- Released: 17 January 2014
- Recorded: 2013
- Studio: 123 (London, England); Metropolis (London, England)
- Genre: Classical crossover; house; dance-pop; Euro house; deep house
- Length: 3:47
- Label: Atlantic
- Songwriters: Jack Patterson; James Napier; Nicole Marshall; Grace Chatto
- Producers: Grace Chatto; Jack Patterson

Clean Bandit singles chronology
"Dust Clears" (2013)	"Rather Be" (2014)	"Extraordinary" (2014)

Jess Glynne singles chronology
"Rather Be" (2014)	"My Love" (2014)

Music video
- "Rather Be" on YouTube

"Rather Be" is a song by English electronic music group Clean Bandit, featuring vocals by English singer Jess Glynne. It was released on 17 January 2014 as the fourth single from the group's debut studio album, New Eyes (2014). It also appears on the deluxe version of Glynne's debut album, I Cry When I Laugh (2015). It was co-written by band members Jack Patterson and Grace Chatto, along with Jimmy Napes and Nicole Marshall, and produced by Patterson and Chatto.

The song debuted at number one on the UK Singles Chart and was the third fastest-selling single of 2014, and the highest-selling January single since "Spaceman" by Babylon Zoo in 1996. The song spent four weeks at number one, selling over one million copies since release and becoming only the seventh single to go 3× platinum. "Rather Be" also reached number one in eleven additional countries including Austria, Finland, Germany, Norway and Sweden. It was the best selling single of 2014 in the Netherlands, was the tenth highest-selling single of the 2010s decade in the UK, and is certified platinum or higher in eleven countries. In the United States, the song peaked at number ten on the Billboard Hot 100. It was placed at number four on Billboard's 10 Best Songs of 2014 list.

"Rather Be" has also become an international hit in part due to the song's video becoming a viral hit on YouTube. Filmed in Tokyo and featuring Haruka Abe, it has over 800 million views. It won the Best Dance Recording category at the 2015 Grammy Awards in the United States.

== Background and composition ==
"Rather Be" was written by Clean Bandit keyboardist Jack Patterson, Nicole Marshall and James Napier (frequent collaborator of Disclosure), and was produced by Clean Bandit cellist Grace Chatto and Patterson.

"Rather Be" is recorded in the key of G-sharp minor (although is frequently notated in sheet music in the easier to play key of A minor due to the song's popularity), in common time and at a light tempo of 120 beats per minute. The track's instrumentation includes a violin, chiptune-style synth blips, a slow bass, piano and vocals. According to Pandora.com, the song features a "vocal counterpoint", a subtle "buildup/breakdown", use of "modal harmonies", the use of "chordal patterning" and "staccato synths".

== Release and critical reception ==
Professional ratings
Review scores
Source	Rating
Contactmusic.com	4/5 stars
Digital Spy	4/5 stars

"Rather Be" received its first play on 4 December 2013, when it featured as BBC Radio 1 DJ Zane Lowe's Hottest Record in the World. The song's digital release date was originally planned to be 19 January 2014, but was moved to 17 January. The single was issued by Warner Music, and is the third to be taken from Clean Bandit's debut studio album. Warner Music Group also released a number of official remixes released for download, with DJs such as All About She and Cash Cash.

The song was met with critical acclaim in the music press, with both positive reviews from contactmusic and Digital Spy, who commented, "Co-penned with Disclosure hitmaker Jimmy Napes, 'Rather Be' blends classical-inspired violin with uplifting house beats and a vocal that sounds suspiciously like Natasha Bedingfield. The result is an infectious sound that feels fresh and exciting.". The song was placed at number four on Billboard's 10 Best Songs of 2014 list. In December 2014, the song received a nomination for Grammy Award for Best Dance Recording, which it would go on to win in early 2015.

== Commercial performance ==
The song debuted at number one on the UK Singles Chart, selling 163,000 copies in the first week. It was the third fastest-selling single of 2014 (behind Band Aid 30's "Do They Know It's Christmas?" and Ben Haenow's "Something I Need"), and the highest-selling January single since "Spaceman" by Babylon Zoo in 1996. It stayed there for four weeks, the longest UK number one for three years. It is the second best-selling song of 2014 in the UK, selling over 1.13 million copies by the end of the year. On the US Billboard Hot 100, the song peaked at number ten, marking Clean Bandit's and Glynne's first US top 10. The song was a remarkable success worldwide, topping the charts in 13 different countries.

Upon its release, "Rather Be" held the record for the most streams in a single week on Spotify in the United Kingdom. The track received 1.09 million plays over seven days in February 2014, surpassing the record previously held by Daft Punk's "Get Lucky", although this record has now been surpassed.

In August 2015, the British Phonographic Industry certified the song 3× platinum (the sixth song of the century to achieve this). It stayed in the top 75 for 73 weeks, setting the record for the longest unbroken run (since equalled by "Thinking Out Loud" by Ed Sheeran). As of September 2017, the song has sold in the UK 1,283,000 copies in pure sales, it also gained 93 million in streams, making a total of 2,219,000 in combined units.

== Music video ==
The music video was directed by the group and was uploaded to YouTube on 5 December 2013. It has since received more than 842 million views. The video was filmed in Tokyo, Japan, and features Haruka Abe as a Japanese fan. During the video, Abe lip-syncs to Jess Glynne's vocals. Jess Glynne herself also appears in the video. The band comments:

"The video is about a Japanese fan of the band who becomes delirious and has hallucinations of band members and our logo appearing unexpectedly in her daily life as a chef. Filming in Tokyo was an amazing experience: we spent almost a week there and everyone was so helpful. We made it ourselves as always, which was quite scary as we've never produced anything so far away before. We had a bit of trouble filming the scene on the train though. Turns out it's considered incredibly rude to make noise on a train so when we started dancing around to the track in the carriage with the extras, it didn't go down well! Got shouted at."

The video begins with the girl waking up and petting her cat, she then goes to her desk and turns on her tape recorder and begins to lip sync the song as she draws in her sketch book. She then leaves her home, rides her scooter in the city, goes to a fish market and her job as a chef, during these times, she has hallucinations about seeing the Clean Bandit members and other people dancing around her everywhere she goes. She goes home and lays down on her bed and suddenly hallucinates about being at a Clean Bandit concert, she then walks in the city and encounters a keyboardist playing in the streets and notices his eye being weird and she begins to run away and she gets on the subway and sees people dancing to the song and she faints. She is then seen in a mental hospital as her father visits her as she struggles to wake up and still lip-syncing to the song. The video ends with her father taking off a mask revealing to be Jack Patterson.

== Live performances ==
On 16 January 2014, the group performed "Rather Be" in BBC Radio 1's Live Lounge, together with a cover version of Lorde's "Royals". They performed it as part of their sets at the Summertime Ball, Glastonbury and T in the Park. They also performed at the 2015 Brit Awards nomination launch party along with their new single "Real Love".

== In popular culture ==
- In April 2014, the 1975 covered the song while at the BBC Radio 1 Live Lounge.
- From September 2014 to December 2016, the instrumental of the song was used in Marks & Spencer food adverts, until January 2017 when the music was changed to "Shape of You" by Ed Sheeran.
- In September 2014, Coca-Cola released a commercial in the United States featuring the chorus of the song.
- In September 2014, YES Network featured the song in the closing credits montage of Derek Jeter's final season of playing Major League Baseball.
- The song was featured in the season 6 episode of Glee entitled "The Rise and Fall of Sue Sylvester". The song is performed by the members of The New Directions.
- The song was used in the Konami game, Pro Evolution Soccer 2016 as third track.
- The song is the backing music in 2016 for ads for Graton Resort and Casino in northern California.
- Mazda has used the song in an Australian commercial for the Mazda2 vehicle.
- The Australian singer Jessica Mauboy covered the song on her album The Secret Daughter Season Two: Songs from the Original 7 Series (2017).
- A cover version by Marc Scibilia was featured in the 2018 Sony Pictures Animation film Peter Rabbit.
- The song was featured over the closing credits to the final episode of Sense8, "Amor Vincit Omnia", with behind-the-scenes clips of the production of the show.
- The instrumental version of the song was used in Amphibiland, the pilot version of Amphibia.
- The song is featured on the 2022 dance rhythm game Just Dance 2023 Edition.

== Track listing ==
Digital download
No.	Title	Length
1.	"Rather Be" (featuring Jess Glynne)	3:49

Digital download — remixes
No.	Title	Length
1.	"Rather Be" (featuring Jess Glynne) (The Magician remix)	4:34
2.	"Rather Be" (featuring Jess Glynne) (All About She remix)	3:49
3.	"Rather Be" (featuring Jess Glynne) (Walter Ego remix)	5:57
4.	"Rather Be" (featuring Jess Glynne) (Affelaye remix)	6:01

Digital download — remixes (Pt. 2)
No.	Title	Length
1.	"Rather Be" (featuring Jess Glynne) (Cash Cash x Valley remix)	4:52
2.	"Rather Be" (featuring Jess Glynne) (OVERWERK remix)	6:16
3.	"Rather Be" (featuring Jess Glynne) (JackLNDN remix)	5:07

German, Swiss and Austrian CD single
No.	Title	Length
1.	"Rather Be" (featuring Jess Glynne)	3:48
2.	"Rather Be" (featuring Jess Glynne) (The Magician remix)	4:34
3.	"Rather Be" (featuring Jess Glynne) (All About She remix)	3:49
4.	"Rather Be" (featuring Jess Glynne) (Walter Ego remix)	5:57
5.	"Rather Be" (featuring Jess Glynne) (Affelaye remix)	6:01

== Credits and personnel ==
Credits adapted from "Rather Be" CD single liner notes.

=== Musicians ===
- Jack Patterson – keyboards, piano
- Grace Chatto – cello
- Luke Patterson – drums
- Anthony Strong – piano
- Asher Zaccardelli – viola
- Beatrice Philips – violin
- Neil Amin-Smith – violin
- Florence Rawlings – vocals
- Jess Glynne – vocals

=== Technical ===
- Jack Patterson – producer, mixer
- Grace Chatto – producer
- Lewis Hopkin – mastering
- Wez Clarke – mixer
- Liam Nolan – engineer
- Brett Shaw – engineer (album version, mistakenly uncredited on single version)

== Accolades ==
Year	Award	Nominated work	Category	Result
2014	Billboard's Best of 2014 Edition	"Rather Be"	10 Best Songs of 2014	No. 4
2015	57th Annual Grammy Awards	"Rather Be"	Best Dance Recording	Won

== Charts ==
=== Weekly charts ===
Chart (2014–2015)	Peak position
Australia (ARIA)	2
Austria (Ö3 Austria Top 40)	1
Belgium (Ultratop 50 Flanders)	2
Belgium (Ultratop 50 Wallonia)	3
Canada Hot 100 (Billboard)	13
Canada AC (Billboard)	25
Hot Canadian Digital Song Sales (Billboard)	12
Canada CHR/Top 40 (Billboard)	10
Canada Hot AC (Billboard)	16
CIS Airplay (TopHit)	11
Croatia International Airplay (HRT)	1
Czech Republic Airplay (ČNS IFPI)	1
Czech Republic Singles Digital (ČNS IFPI)	1
Denmark (Tracklisten)	5
Europe (Euro Digital Songs)	1
Finland (Suomen virallinen lista)	1
France (SNEP)	2
Germany (GfK)	1
Hungary (Dance Top 40)	2
Hungary (Rádiós Top 40)	1
Hungary (Single Top 40)	2
Ireland (IRMA)	1
Israel International Airplay (Media Forest)	1
Italy (FIMI)	2
Italy Airplay (EarOne)	1
Japan Hot 100 (Billboard)	38
Lebanon (OLT20)	8
Luxembourg Digital Song Sales (Billboard)	2
Mexico (Billboard Mexican Airplay)	4
Mexico Anglo (Monitor Latino)	8
Netherlands (Dutch Top 40)	1
Netherlands (Single Top 100)	1
New Zealand (Recorded Music NZ)	2
Norway (VG-lista)	1
Romania (Airplay 100)	9
Poland Airplay (ZPAV)	1
Portugal Digital Song Sales (Billboard)	4
Russia Airplay (TopHit)	8
Scottish Singles Sales (Official Charts)	1
Slovakia Airplay (ČNS IFPI)	3
Slovakia Singles Digital (ČNS IFPI)	7
Slovenia (SloTop50)	5
South Africa Airplay (EMA)	7
Spain (Promusicae)	5
Sweden (Sverigetopplistan)	1
Switzerland (Schweizer Hitparade)	2
UK Singles (Official Charts)	1
UK Dance (Official Charts)	1
Ukraine Airplay (TopHit)	56
US Billboard Hot 100	10
US Adult Contemporary (Billboard)	21
US Adult Pop Airplay (Billboard)	10
US Hot Dance/Electronic Songs (Billboard)	1
US Dance Club Songs (Billboard)	24
US Pop Airplay (Billboard)	6
US Rhythmic Airplay (Billboard)	24

=== Year-end charts ===
Chart (2014)	Position
Australia (ARIA)	14
Austria (Ö3 Austria Top 40)	13
Belgium (Ultratop 50 Flanders)	6
Belgium Dance (Ultratop Flanders)	1
Belgium (Ultratop 50 Wallonia)	7
Belgium Dance (Ultratop Wallonia)	4
Brazil (Crowley)	48
Canada (Canadian Hot 100)	47
Denmark (Tracklisten)	8
France (SNEP)	11
Germany (Official German Charts)	7
Hungary (Dance Top 40)	4
Hungary (Rádiós Top 40)	7
Hungary (Single Top 40)	5
Israel (Media Forest)	2
Italy (FIMI)	4
Italy Airplay (EarOne)	4
Ireland (IRMA)	5
Japan Adult Contemporary (Billboard)	10
New Zealand (Recorded Music NZ)	17
Netherlands (Dutch Top 40)	1
Netherlands (Single Top 100)	3
Poland (Poland Top 100 Airplay)	7
Romania (Airplay 100)	43
Russia Airplay (TopHit)	19
Slovenia (SloTop50)	15
Spain (PROMUSICAE)	18
Sweden (Sverigetopplistan)	4
Switzerland (Schweizer Hitparade)	7
UK Singles (OCC)	2
Ukraine Airplay (TopHit)	62
US Billboard Hot 100	41
US Adult Top 40 (Billboard)	47
US Hot Dance/Electronic Songs (Billboard)	4
US Mainstream Top 40 (Billboard)	29

Chart (2015)	Position
France (SNEP)	138
Hungary (Dance Top 40)	34
UK Singles (OCC)	86
US Hot Dance/Electronic Songs (Billboard)	11

=== Decade-end charts ===
Chart (2010–2019)	Position
Netherlands (Single Top 100)	18
UK Singles (OCC)	10
US Hot Dance/Electronic Songs (Billboard)	15

=== All-time charts ===
Chart	Position
UK Singles (OCC)	72

== Certifications ==
Region	Certification	Certified units/sales
Australia (ARIA)	6× Platinum	420,000^{‡}
Austria (IFPI Austria)	Platinum	30,000^{*}
Belgium (BRMA)	2× Platinum	40,000^{‡}
Canada (Music Canada)	5× Platinum	400,000^{‡}
France (SNEP)	Platinum	150,000^{*}
Germany (BVMI)	2× Platinum	1,200,000^{‡}
Italy (FIMI)	4× Platinum	120,000^{‡}
Japan (RIAJ)	Gold	100,000^{*}
Mexico (AMPROFON)	Platinum	60,000^{*}
Netherlands (NVPI)	Platinum	20,000^{^}
New Zealand (RMNZ)	6× Platinum	180,000^{‡}
Portugal (AFP)	Gold	10,000^{‡}
Spain (Promusicae)	2× Platinum	80,000^{‡}
Sweden (GLF)	2× Platinum	80,000^{‡}
Switzerland (IFPI Switzerland)	Platinum	30,000^{^}
United Kingdom (BPI)	6× Platinum	3,600,000^{‡}
United States (RIAA)	4× Platinum	4,000,000^{‡}
Streaming
Denmark (IFPI Danmark)	3× Platinum	7,800,000^{†}
Japan (RIAJ)	Gold	50,000,000^{†}
Spain (Promusicae)	2× Platinum	16,000,000^{†}
^{*} Sales figures based on certification alone.^{^} Shipments figures based on certification alone.^{‡} Sales+streaming figures based on certification alone.^{†} Streaming-only figures based on certification alone.

== Release history ==
Region	Date	Format	Label
United Kingdom	4 December 2013	Radio airplay	WMG
Worldwide	17 January 2014	Digital download	WMG
Canada	19 January 2014	Digital download – remixes	WMG
United Kingdom	19 January 2014	Digital download – remixes	WMG
United States	19 January 2014	Digital download – remixes	WMG
United States	18 March 2014	Contemporary hit radio	Big Beat
Canada	19 May 2014	Digital download – remixes: Part 2	WMG
United States	19 May 2014	Digital download – remixes: Part 2	WMG
