= List of UK top-ten singles in 2014 =

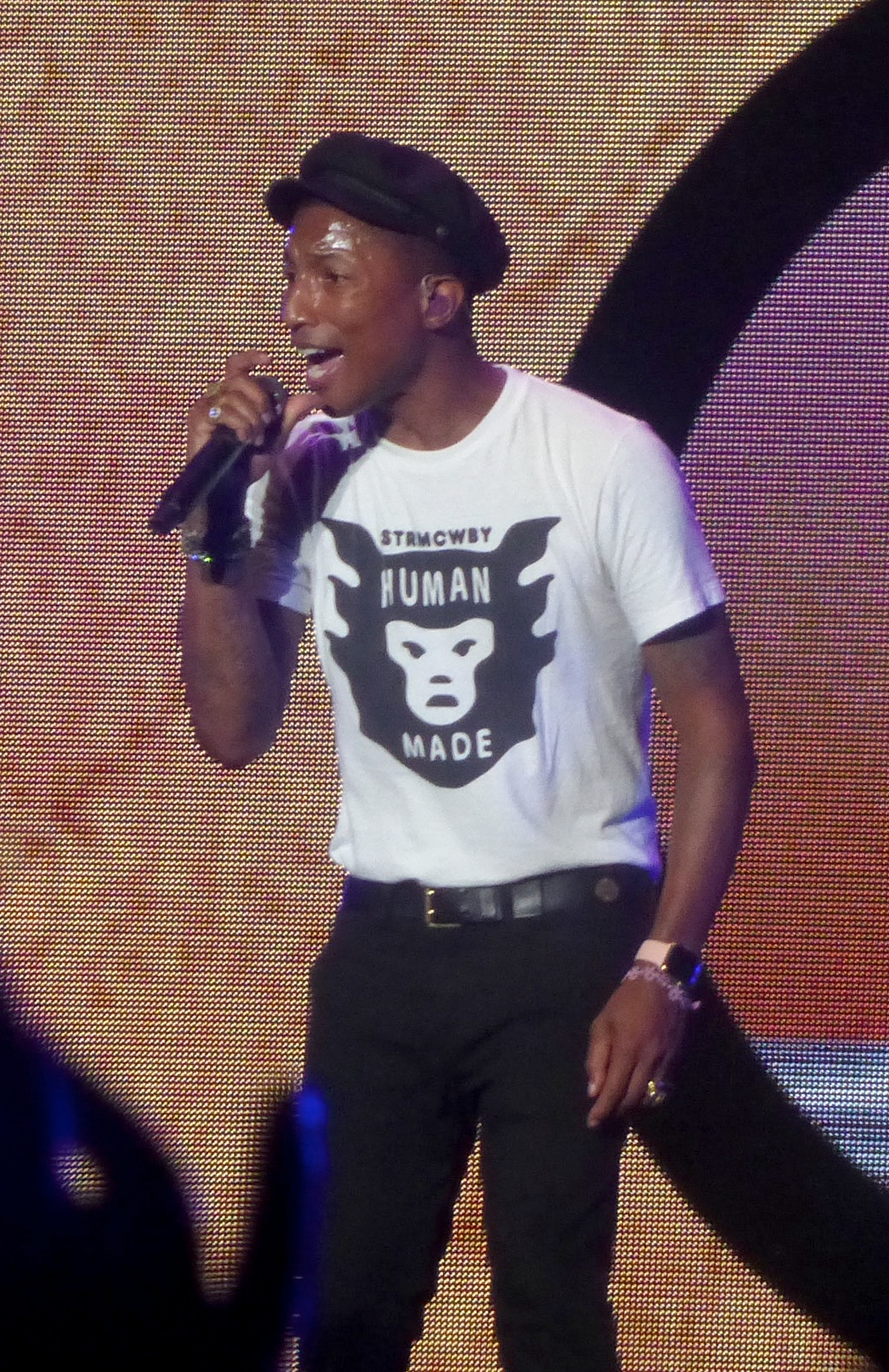
Pharrell Williams had the best-selling single of 2014 with "Happy", taken from the soundtrack of Despicable Me 2, which first entered the top 10 in December 2013, peaked at number-one on 4 January 2014, and spent 20 weeks in the top 10 altogether.

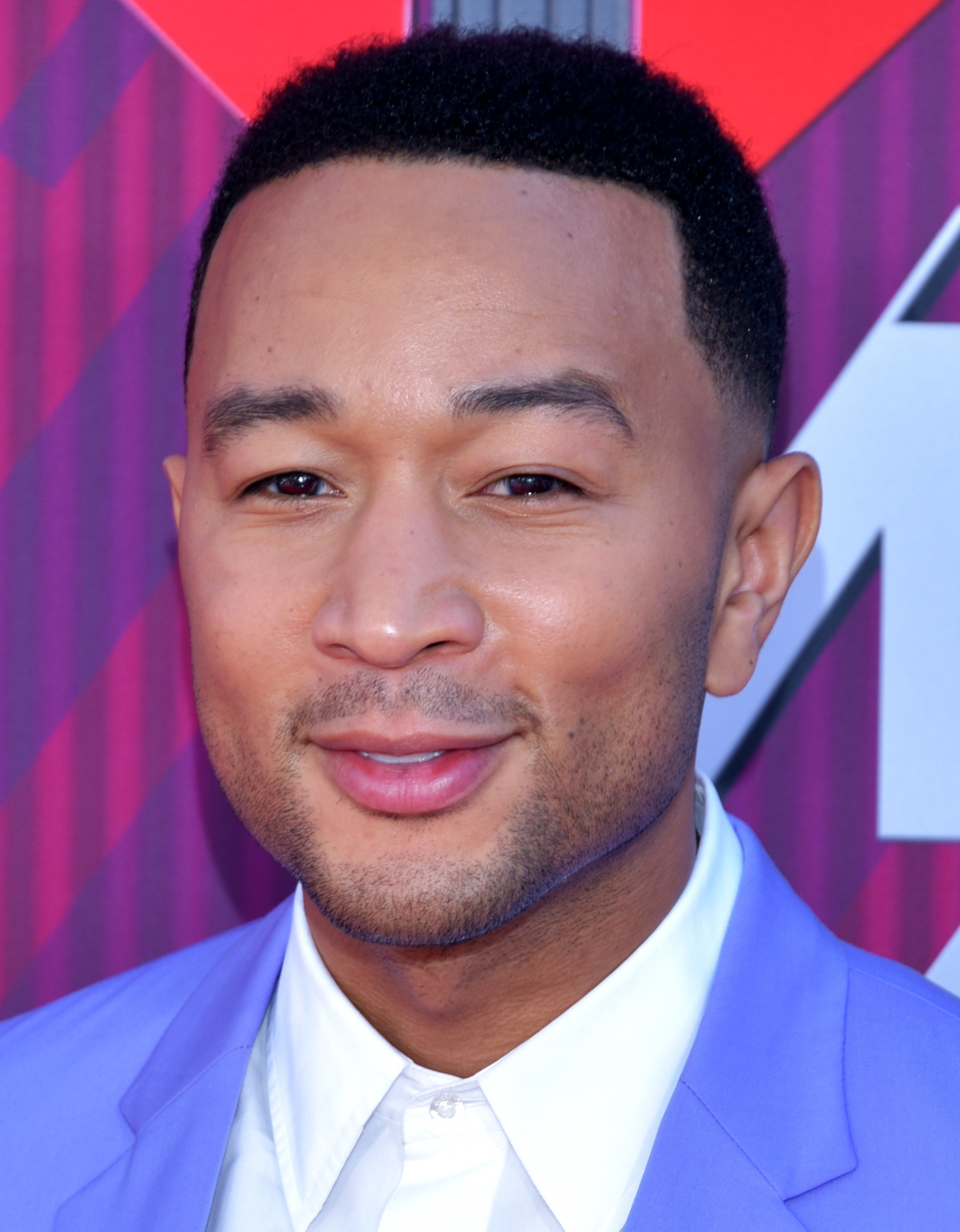
John Legend spent 19 non-consecutive weeks in the UK top 10 this year with "All of Me", which peaked at number two in April and became the third best selling single of the year.

The UK Singles Chart is one of many music charts compiled by the Official Charts Company that calculates the best-selling singles of the week in the United Kingdom. Since 2004 the chart has been based on the sales of both physical singles and digital downloads, with airplay figures excluded from the official chart. From 6 July, streaming figures became incorporated into the singles chart which means that a song will count as a sale, if streamed 100 times. This list shows singles that peaked in the Top 10 of the UK Singles Chart during 2014, as well as singles which peaked in 2013 but were in the top 10 in 2014. The entry date is when the single appeared in the top 10 for the first time (week ending, as published by the Official Charts Company, which is six days after the chart is announced).

One-hundred and fifty-five singles were in the top ten in 2014. Seven singles from 2013 remained in the top 10 for several weeks at the beginning of the year. "Happy" by Pharrell Williams" (from the Despicable Me 2 soundtrack) and "Trumpets" by Jason Derulo were the singles from 2013 to reach their peak in 2014. Fifty-eight artists scored multiple entries in the top 10 in 2014. Ariana Grande, Clean Bandit, George Ezra, Jess Glynne, Meghan Trainor and Shawn Mendes were among the many artists who achieved their first UK charting top 10 single in 2014.

The first number-one single of the year was "Happy", which spent four non-consecutive weeks on top of the chart. The song vacated number-one for a week on 11 January 2014, being replaced by "Timber" by Kesha and Pitbull before returning to the top spot. Overall, thirty-eight different singles peaked at number-one in 2014, with Ed Sheeran and Sam Smith (3) having the joint most singles hit that position (including artist's participation on the Band Aid 30 charity single).

== Background ==
=== Multiple entries ===
One-hundred and fifty-two singles charted in the top 10 in 2014, with one-hundred and forty-three singles reaching their peak this year.

Fifty-eight artists scored multiple entries in the top 10 in 2014. Sam Smith secured the record for most top 10 hits in 2014 with five hit singles.

=== Chart debuts ===
Ninety-four artists achieved their first top 10 single in 2014, either as a lead or featured artist. This includes the charity group Band Aid 30 (made up of chart acts but charting together for the first time) and Gareth Malone's All Star Choir. Of these, ten went on to record another hit single that year: Ariana Grande, Ella Henderson, George Ezra, Gorgon City, Kiesza, Melissa Steel, Neon Jungle, Robin Schulz, Sam Martin and Tiësto. 5 Seconds of Summer and Clean Bandit achieved two more chart hits in 2014. Jess Glynne had three other entries in her breakthrough year.

The following table (collapsed on desktop site) does not include acts who had previously charted as part of a group and secured their first top 10 solo single.

Artist	Number of top 10s	First entry	Chart position	Other entries
Matrix & Futurebound	1	"Control"	7	—
Max Marshall	1	"Control"	7	—
Elyar Fox	1	"Do It All Over Again"	5	—
Clean Bandit	3	"Rather Be"	1	"Extraordinary" (5), "Real Love" (2)
Jess Glynne	3	"Rather Be"	1	"My Love" (1), "Right Here" (6), "Real Love" (2)
Neon Jungle	2	"Braveheart"	4	"Welcome to the Jungle" (7)
Vance Joy	1	"Riptide"	10	—
French Montana	1	"Feelin' Myself"	2	—
DJ Mustard	1	"Feelin' Myself"	2	—
Gorgon City	2	"Ready for Your Love"	4	"Here for You" (7)
MNEK	1	"Ready for Your Love"	4	—
Jay Fay	1	"Dibby Dibby Sound"	3	—
Alesso	1	"If I Lose Myself"	8	—
Zedd	1	"Stay the Night"	2	—
Juicy J	1	"Dark Horse"	4	—
A Great Big World	1	"Say Something (A Great Big World song)"	4	—
Tiësto	2	"Red Lights"	6	"Wasted" (3)
Foxes	1	"Let Go for Tonight"	7	—
Route 94	1	"My Love"	1	—
DVBBS	1	"Tsunami (Jump)"	1	—
Borgeous	1	"Tsunami (Jump)"	1	—
Jax Jones	1	"I Got U"	1	—
5 Seconds of Summer	3	"She Looks So Perfect"	1	"Don't Stop" (2), "Amnesia" (7)
Faul & Wad Ad	1	"Changes"	3	—
Pnau	1	"Changes"	3	—
Jay Hardway	1	"Wizard"	7	—
Sigma	1	"Nobody to Love"	1	"Changing" (1)
Kiesza	2	"Hideaway"	1	"Giant in My Heart" (4)
Shift K3Y	1	"Touch"	3	—
Tove Lo	1	"Stay High"	6	—
Hippie Sabotage	1	"Stay High"	6	—
Mr. Probz	1	"Waves"	1	—
Cash Cash	1	"Take Me Home"	5	—
Bebe Rexha	1	"Take Me Home"	5	—
DJ Cassidy	1	"Calling All Hearts"	6	—
G.R.L.	1	"Wild Wild Love"	6	—
The Common Linnets	1	"Calm After the Storm"	9	—
Sharna Bass	1	"Extraordinary"	5	—
SecondCity	1	"I Wanna Feel"	1	—
Klingande	1	"Jubel"	3	—
Ella Henderson	1	"Ghost"	1	"Glow" (7)
Matthew Koma	1	"Wasted"	3	—
Rik Mayall	1	"Noble England"	7	—
George Ezra	2	"Budapest"	3	"Blame It on Me" (6)
Laura Welsh	1	"Here for You"	7	—
Oliver Heldens	1	"Gecko (Overdrive)"	1	—
Becky Hill	1	"Gecko (Overdrive)"	1	—
Ariana Grande	2	"Problem"	1	"Bang Bang" (1)
TC	1	"Make U Bounce"	10	—
Little Nikki	1	"Make U Bounce"	10	—
Cody Wise	1	"It's My Birthday"	1	—
Rixton	1	"Me and My Broken Heart"	1	—
Magic!	1	"Rude"	1	—
Zhu	1	"Faded"	3	—
Bars and Melody	1	"Hopeful"	5	—
Melissa Steel	2	"Kisses for Breakfast"	10	"I Loved You" (7)
Popcaan	1	"Kisses for Breakfast"	10	—
Nico & Vinz	1	"Am I Wrong"	1	—
Sam Martin	2	"Lovers on the Sun"	1	"Dangerous" (5)
Wankelmut	1	"My Head Is a Jungle"	5	—
Emma Louise	1	"My Head Is a Jungle"	5	—
Lilly Wood and the Prick	1	"Prayer in C"	1	—
Robin Schulz	1	"Prayer in C"	1	—
Ten Walls	1	"Walking with Elephants"	6	—
Rick Ross	1	"New Flame"	10	—
Tori Kelly	1	"Lullaby"	4	—
Meghan Trainor	1	"All About That Bass"	1	—
The Magician	1	"Sunlight"	7	—
Years & Years	1	"Sunlight"	7	—
Jeremih	1	"Don't Tell 'Em"	5	—
YG	1	"Don't Tell 'Em"	5	—
Shawn Mendes	1	"Oh Cecilia (Breaking My Heart)"	9	—
Waze & Odyssey	1	"Bump & Grind 2014"	3	—
Parra for Cuva	1	"Wicked Games"	6	—
Anna Naklab	1	"Wicked Games"	6	—
Gareth Malone's All Star Choir	1	"Wake Me Up"	1	—
Alice Levine	1	"Wake Me Up"	1	—
Alison Steadman	1	"Wake Me Up"	1	—
Craig Revel Horwood	1	"Wake Me Up"	1	—
Fabrice Muamba	1	"Wake Me Up"	1	—
Jo Brand	1	"Wake Me Up"	1	—
John Craven	1	"Wake Me Up"	1	—
Larry Lamb	1	"Wake Me Up"	1	—
Linda Robson	1	"Wake Me Up"	1	—
Margaret Alphonsi	1	"Wake Me Up"	1	—
Mel Giedroyc	1	"Wake Me Up"	1	—
Nitin Ganatra	1	"Wake Me Up"	1	—
Radzi Chinyanganya	1	"Wake Me Up"	1	—
Band Aid 30	1	"Do They Know It's Christmas?"	1	—
Jessie Ware	1	"Do They Know It's Christmas?"	1	—
Blonde	1	"I Loved You"	7	—
KStewart	1	"Last All Night (Koala)"	5	—
Ben Haenow	1	"Something I Need"	1	—
The Wealdstone Raider	1	"Got No Fans"	5	—

Notes

French Montana was featured on the East/West coast version of Chris Brown's "Loyal" but not credited on the UK release. Becky Hill previously sang uncredited vocals on the Wilkinson song "Afterglow" in 2013. Clean Bandit officially had three singles as a group this year, but their members Grace Chatto and Jack and Luke Patterson featured on the Band Aid 30 charity single "Do They Know It's Christmas?".

=== Songs from films ===
Original songs from various films entered the top 10 throughout the year. These included "Happy" (from Despicable Me 2), "Boom Clap" (The Fault in Our Stars), "Wasted" (22 Jump Street) and "Beating Heart" (Divergent).

=== Best-selling singles ===
Pharrell Williams had the best-selling single of the year with "Happy. The song spent 20 weeks in the top 10 (including four weeks at number one), sold around 1.85 million copies (including streams) and was certified 4× platinum by the BPI. "Rather Be" by Clean Bandit featuring Jess Glynne came in second place, selling more than 1.52 million and losing out by around 330,000 sales. John Legend's "All of Me", "Waves" from Mr Probz and "Thinking Out Loud" by Ed Sheeran made up the top five. Singles by Ella Henderson, Sam Smith, Meghan Trainor, Pitbull and George Ezra were also in the top 10 best-selling singles of 2014.

"Happy" also stands as the 9th biggest-selling single of all time in the UK (as of December 2017).

== Top-ten singles ==
Key

Symbol	Meaning
‡	Single peaked in 2013 but still in chart in 2014.
(#)	Year-end top-ten single position and rank
Entered	The date that the single first appeared in the chart.
Peak	Highest position that the single reached in the UK Singles Chart.

Entered (week ending)	Weeks in top 10	Single	Artist	Peak	Peak reached (week ending)	Weeks at peak
Singles in 2013
14 September 2013	10	"Roar" ‡ ^{[A]}	Katy Perry	1	14 September 2013	2
21 September 2013	11	"Counting Stars" ‡ ^{[B]}	OneRepublic	1	12 October 2013	2
9 November 2013	12	"The Monster" ‡	Eminem featuring Rihanna	1	9 November 2013	1
9 November 2013	10	"Story of My Life" ‡	One Direction	2	14 December 2013	1
23 November 2013	6	"Animals" ‡ ^{[C]}	Martin Garrix	1	23 November 2013	1
23 November 2013	7	"Somewhere Only We Know" ‡	Lily Allen	1	30 November 2013	3
23 November 2013	10	"How Long Will I Love You?" ‡	Ellie Goulding	3	23 November 2013	1
14 December 2013	10	"Hey Brother" ‡	Avicii	2	21 December 2013	1
21 December 2013	20	"Happy" (#1)	Pharrell Williams	1	4 January 2014	4
21 December 2013	8	"Trumpets"	Jason Derulo	4	4 January 2014	4
28 December 2013	3	"Skyscraper" ‡	Sam Bailey	1	28 December 2013	1
Singles in 2014
11 January 2014	8	"Timber" (#9)	Pitbull featuring Kesha	1	11 January 2014	1
18 January 2014	3	"Million Pound Girl (Badder Than Bad)"	Fuse ODG	5	18 January 2014	1
18 January 2014	3	"Control"	Matrix & Futurebound featuring Max Marshall	7	18 January 2014	1
18 January 2014	2	"Drunk in Love" ^{[D]}	Beyoncé featuring Jay-Z	9	8 February 2014	1
25 January 2014	1	"Do It All Over Again"	Elyar Fox	5	25 January 2014	1
25 January 2014	1	"Turn Back Time"	Sub Focus	10	25 January 2014	1
1 February 2014	12	"Rather Be" (#2)	Clean Bandit featuring Jess Glynne	1	1 February 2014	4
1 February 2014	1	"Wild Heart"	The Vamps	3	1 February 2014	1
1 February 2014	3	"Braveheart"	Neon Jungle	4	1 February 2014	1
1 February 2014	1	"Riptide"	Vance Joy	10	1 February 2014	1
8 February 2014	3	"Feelin' Myself"	will.i.am featuring Miley Cyrus, French Montana, Wiz Khalifa, & DJ Mustard	2	8 February 2014	1
8 February 2014	3	"Ready for Your Love"	Gorgon City featuring MNEK	4	8 February 2014	1
8 February 2014	4	"Crying for No Reason"	Katy B	5	8 February 2014	2
15 February 2014	3	"Dibby Dibby Sound"	DJ Fresh vs. Jay Fay featuring Ms. Dynamite	3	15 February 2014	1
15 February 2014	1	"If I Lose Myself"	Alesso vs. OneRepublic	8	15 February 2014	1
22 February 2014	3	"Stay the Night"	Zedd featuring Hayley Williams	2	22 February 2014	1
22 February 2014	2	"Shot Me Down"	David Guetta featuring Skylar Grey	4	22 February 2014	1
22 February 2014	8	"Dark Horse" ^{[E]}	Katy Perry featuring Juicy J	4	8 March 2014	2
1 March 2014	5	"Money on My Mind"	Sam Smith	1	1 March 2014	1
1 March 2014	3	"Say Something"	A Great Big World & Christina Aguilera	4	1 March 2014	1
8 March 2014	2	"Red Lights"	Tiësto	6	8 March 2014	1
8 March 2014	1	"Let Go for Tonight"	Foxes	7	8 March 2014	1
8 March 2014	19	"All of Me" (#3) ^{[F]}	John Legend	2	12 April 2014	1
8 March 2014	1	"Can't Rely on You"	Paloma Faith	10	8 March 2014	1
15 March 2014	7	"My Love"	Route 94 featuring Jess Glynne	1	15 March 2014	1
15 March 2014	1	"Air Balloon"	Lily Allen	7	15 March 2014	1
15 March 2014	1	"Magic"	Coldplay	10	15 March 2014	1
22 March 2014	3	"Tsunami (Jump)"	DVBBS & Borgeous featuring Tinie Tempah	1	22 March 2014	1
22 March 2014	3	"I'm a Freak" ^{[G]}	Enrique Iglesias featuring Pitbull	4	22 March 2014	1
22 March 2014	1	"How I Feel"	Flo Rida	8	22 March 2014	1
22 March 2014	1	"Nasty"	Pixie Lott	9	22 March 2014	1
29 March 2014	5	"I Got U"	Duke Dumont featuring Jax Jones	1	29 March 2014	1
29 March 2014	1	"Word Up!" ^{[H]}	Little Mix	6	29 March 2014	1
5 April 2014	2	"She Looks So Perfect"	5 Seconds of Summer	1	5 April 2014	1
5 April 2014	2	"Changes"	Faul & Wad Ad vs. Pnau	3	5 April 2014	1
5 April 2014	1	"Wizard"	Martin Garrix & Jay Hardway	7	5 April 2014	1
12 April 2014	3	"The Man"	Aloe Blacc	1	12 April 2014	1
12 April 2014	1	"Anywhere for You"	John Martin	7	12 April 2014	1
19 April 2014	6	"Nobody to Love"	Sigma	1	19 April 2014	1
19 April 2014	1	"Last Night"	The Vamps	2	19 April 2014	1
19 April 2014	5	"Fancy" ^{[I]}	Iggy Azalea featuring Charli XCX	5	19 April 2014	1
26 April 2014	6	"Hideaway"	Kiesza	1	26 April 2014	1
26 April 2014	3	"Touch"	Shift K3y	3	26 April 2014	1
26 April 2014	4	"Stay High"	Tove Lo featuring Hippie Sabotage	6	26 April 2014	1
3 May 2014	11	"Waves" (#4)	Mr. Probz	1	3 May 2014	2
3 May 2014	3	"Take Me Home"	Cash Cash featuring Bebe Rexha	5	3 May 2014	1
3 May 2014	1	"Calling All Hearts"	DJ Cassidy featuring Robin Thicke & Jessie J	6	3 May 2014	1
3 May 2014	1	"Welcome to the Jungle"	Neon Jungle	7	3 May 2014	1
10 May 2014	5	"Summer"	Calvin Harris	1	10 May 2014	1
10 May 2014	1	"Loyal"	Chris Brown featuring Lil Wayne & Tyga	10	10 May 2014	1
17 May 2014	1	"Wild Wild Love"	Pitbull featuring G.R.L.	6	17 May 2014	1
17 May 2014	5	"Only Love Can Hurt Like This"	Paloma Faith	6	24 May 2014	1
24 May 2014	4	"I Will Never Let You Down"	Rita Ora	1	24 May 2014	1
24 May 2014	2	"Love Never Felt So Good"	Michael Jackson featuring Justin Timberlake	8	24 May 2014	1
24 May 2014	1	"Calm After the Storm"	The Common Linnets	9	24 May 2014	1
31 May 2014	9	"Stay with Me" (#7)	Sam Smith	1	31 May 2014	1
31 May 2014	3	"Dangerous Love"	Fuse ODG featuring Sean Paul	3	31 May 2014	1
31 May 2014	1	"Extraordinary"	Clean Bandit featuring Sharna Bass	5	31 May 2014	1
7 June 2014	3	"I Wanna Feel"	SecondCity	1	7 June 2014	1
7 June 2014	2	"Jubel"	Klingande	3	7 June 2014	1
7 June 2014	1	"Beating Heart"	Ellie Goulding	9	7 June 2014	1
14 June 2014	8	"Sing"	Ed Sheeran	1	14 June 2014	1
14 June 2014	4	"Wiggle"	Jason Derulo featuring Snoop Dogg	8	21 June 2014	3
21 June 2014	11	"Ghost" (#6)	Ella Henderson	1	21 June 2014	2
21 June 2014	2	"Wasted"	Tiësto featuring Matthew Koma	3	21 June 2014	1
21 June 2014	1	"Salute"	Little Mix	6	21 June 2014	1
21 June 2014	1	"Noble England" ^{[J]}	Rik Mayall	7	21 June 2014	1
28 June 2014	1	"Don't Stop"	5 Seconds of Summer	2	28 June 2014	1
28 June 2014	11	"Budapest" (#10) ^{[K]}	George Ezra	3	12 July 2014	1
28 June 2014	1	"Here for You"	Gorgon City featuring Laura Welsh	7	28 June 2014	1
5 July 2014	4	"Gecko (Overdrive)"	Oliver Heldens & Becky Hill	1	5 July 2014	1
5 July 2014	1	"One More Day (Stay with Me)"	Example	4	5 July 2014	1
5 July 2014	1	"Good Kisser"	Usher	10	5 July 2014	1
12 July 2014	7	"Problem"	Ariana Grande featuring Iggy Azalea	1	12 July 2014	1
12 July 2014	2	"Chandelier"	Sia	6	12 July 2014	1
12 July 2014	1	"A Sky Full of Stars"	Coldplay	9	12 July 2014	1
12 July 2014	1	"Make U Bounce"	DJ Fresh vs. TC featuring Little Nikki	10	12 July 2014	1
19 July 2014	5	"It's My Birthday"	will.i.am & Cody Wise	1	19 July 2014	1
19 July 2014	1	"Somebody to You"	The Vamps featuring Demi Lovato	4	19 July 2014	1
19 July 2014	3	"Right Here"	Jess Glynne	6	19 July 2014	1
26 July 2014	2	"Me and My Broken Heart"	Rixton	1	26 July 2014	1
26 July 2014	1	"Your Love"	Nicole Scherzinger	6	26 July 2014	1
2 August 2014	4	"Crazy Stupid Love"	Cheryl Cole featuring Tinie Tempah	1	2 August 2014	1
2 August 2014	10	"Rude"	Magic!	1	9 August 2014	1
2 August 2014	4	"Boom Clap"	Charli XCX	6	2 August 2014	1
9 August 2014	3	"Faded"	Zhu	3	9 August 2014	1
9 August 2014	1	"Hopeful"	Bars and Melody	5	9 August 2014	1
9 August 2014	1	"Kisses for Breakfast"	Melissa Steel featuring Popcaan	10	9 August 2014	1
16 August 2014	5	"Am I Wrong"	Nico & Vinz	1	16 August 2014	2
16 August 2014	3	"Love Runs Out"	OneRepublic	3	16 August 2014	2
23 August 2014	1	"Giant in My Heart"	Kiesza	4	23 August 2014	1
30 August 2014	3	"Lovers on the Sun"	David Guetta featuring Sam Martin	1	30 August 2014	1
30 August 2014	12	"Shake It Off"	Taylor Swift	2	25 October 2014	1
30 August 2014	2	"My Head Is a Jungle"	Wankelmut & Emma Louise	5	30 August 2014	1
30 August 2014	2	"Don't"	Ed Sheeran	8	30 August 2014	2
30 August 2014	1	"Tonight (We Live Forever)"	Union J	9	30 August 2014	1
6 September 2014	6	"Prayer in C"	Lilly Wood and the Prick & Robin Schulz	1	6 September 2014	2
6 September 2014	2	"Maps"	Maroon 5	2	6 September 2014	1
6 September 2014	5	"Black Widow"	Iggy Azalea featuring Rita Ora	4	13 September 2014	1
6 September 2014	10	"I'm Not the Only One" ^{[L]}	Sam Smith	3	20 September 2014	1
13 September 2014	1	"Won't Look Back"	Duke Dumont	2	13 September 2014	1
13 September 2014	3	"Superheroes"	The Script	3	13 September 2014	1
20 September 2014	8	"Blame"	Calvin Harris featuring John Newman	1	20 September 2014	1
20 September 2014	1	"Walking with Elephants"	Ten Walls	6	20 September 2014	1
20 September 2014	1	"Amnesia"	5 Seconds of Summer	7	20 September 2014	1
20 September 2014	1	"New Flame"	Chris Brown featuring Usher & Rick Ross	10	20 September 2014	1
27 September 2014	6	"Changing"	Sigma featuring Paloma Faith	1	27 September 2014	1
27 September 2014	2	"Lullaby"	Professor Green featuring Tori Kelly	4	27 September 2014	1
27 September 2014	4	"Blame It on Me"	George Ezra	6	11 October 2014	1
4 October 2014	7	"Bang Bang"	Jessie J, Ariana Grande & Nicki Minaj	1	4 October 2014	1
11 October 2014	12	"All About That Bass" (#8) ^{[M]}	Meghan Trainor	1	11 October 2014	4
11 October 2014	1	"Sunlight"	The Magician featuring Years & Years	7	11 October 2014	1
18 October 2014	1	"Anaconda"	Nicki Minaj	3	18 October 2014	1
18 October 2014	5	"Don't Tell 'Em"	Jeremih featuring YG	5	18 October 2014	2
18 October 2014	1	"Glow"	Ella Henderson	7	18 October 2014	1
18 October 2014	20	"Thinking Out Loud" (#5)	Ed Sheeran	1	8 November 2014	2
25 October 2014	7	"Steal My Girl" ^{[N]}	One Direction	3	25 October 2014	2
25 October 2014	1	"Oh Cecilia (Breaking My Heart)"	The Vamps featuring Shawn Mendes	9	25 October 2014	1
25 October 2014	1	"Guts Over Fear"	Eminem featuring Sia	10	25 October 2014	1
1 November 2014	2	"Bump & Grind 2014"	Waze & Odyssey vs. R. Kelly	3	1 November 2014	1
1 November 2014	1	"T.I.N.A."	Fuse ODG featuring Angel	9	1 November 2014	1
8 November 2014	1	"Wicked Games"	Parra for Cuva featuring Anna Naklab	6	8 November 2014	1
15 November 2014	2	"I Don't Care"	Cheryl	1	15 November 2014	1
15 November 2014	7	"Outside" ^{[O]}	Calvin Harris featuring Ellie Goulding	6	15 November 2014	2
22 November 2014	2	"Wake Me Up" ^{[P]}	Gareth Malone's All-Star Choir	1	22 November 2014	1
22 November 2014	1	"Real Love" ^{[Q]}^{[R]}	Tom Odell	7	22 November 2014	1
22 November 2014	1	"You Ruin Me"	The Veronicas	8	22 November 2014	1
22 November 2014	2	"Like I Can"	Sam Smith	9	22 November 2014	1
29 November 2014	3	"Do They Know It's Christmas?" ^{[S]}^{[T]}	Band Aid 30	1	29 November 2014	1
29 November 2014	4	"Real Love"	Clean Bandit & Jess Glynne	2	29 November 2014	1
29 November 2014	5	"Wrapped Up"	Olly Murs featuring Travie McCoy	3	29 November 2014	2
29 November 2014	3	"Dangerous"	David Guetta featuring Sam Martin	5	29 November 2014	1
29 November 2014	1	"6 Words"	Wretch 32	8	29 November 2014	1
29 November 2014	10	"Blank Space"	Taylor Swift	4	13 December 2014	2
6 December 2014	5	"These Days"	Take That	1	6 December 2014	1
6 December 2014	1	"Jealous"	Labrinth	7	6 December 2014	1
13 December 2014	1	"You Got It All"	Union J	2	13 December 2014	1
13 December 2014	1	"I Loved You"	Blonde featuring Melissa Steel	7	13 December 2014	1
20 December 2014	18	"Uptown Funk"	Mark Ronson featuring Bruno Mars	1	20 December 2014	7
20 December 2014	1	"Last All Night (Koala)"	Oliver Heldens featuring KStewart	5	20 December 2014	1
20 December 2014	2	"Night Changes"	One Direction	7	20 December 2014	1
27 December 2014	6	"Something I Need"	Ben Haenow	1	27 December 2014	1
27 December 2014	7	"Up"	Olly Murs featuring Demi Lovato	4	27 December 2014	1
27 December 2014	1	"Got No Fans"	The Wealdstone Raider	5	27 December 2014	1

== Entries by artist ==
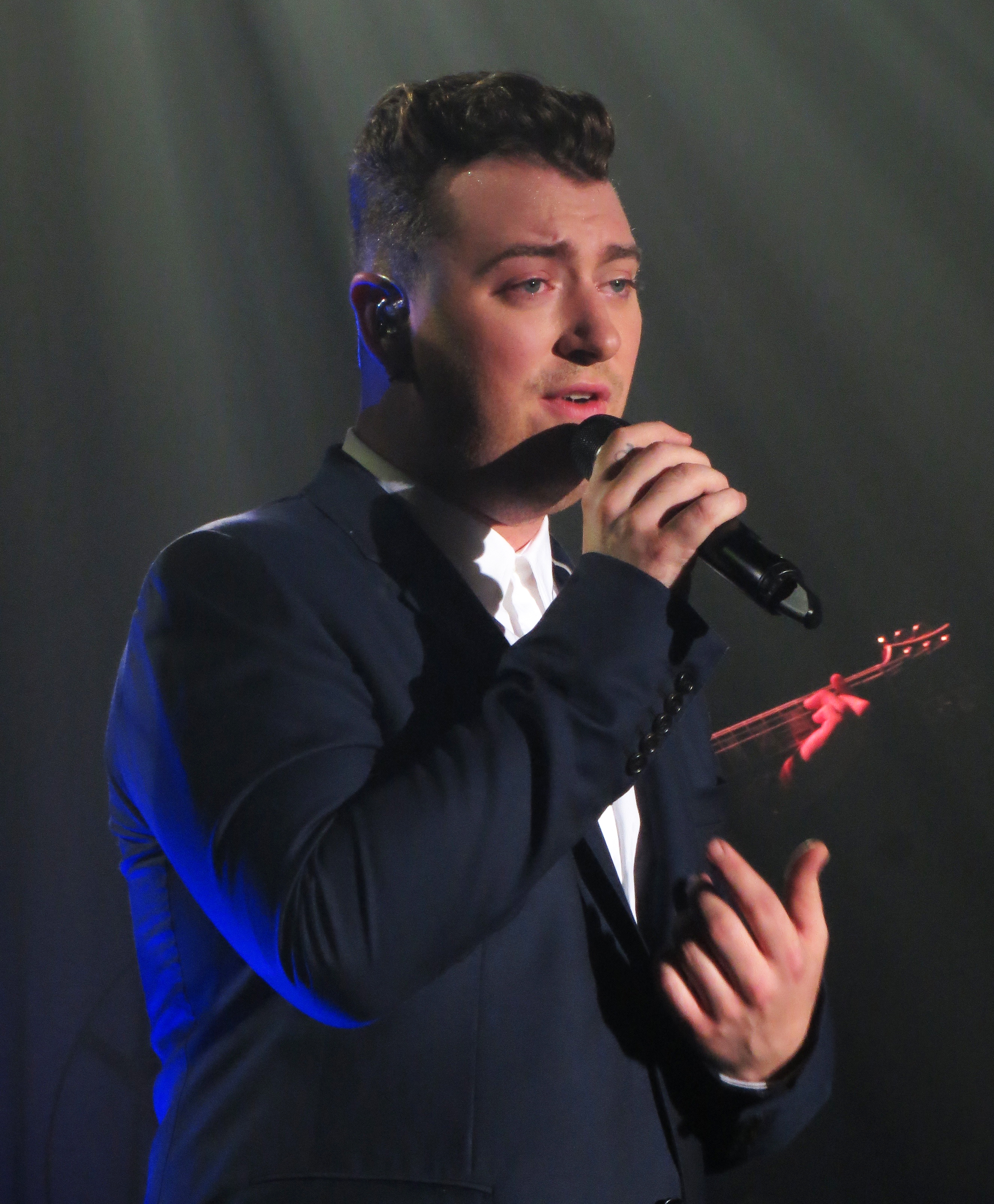
Sam Smith had five UK top 10 singles in 2014, the most of any artist. These included the number-one solo hits "Money on My Mind" and "Stay with Me" (which became the year's fourth best seller), as well as a guest appearance on "Do They Know It's Christmas?" with Band Aid 30.

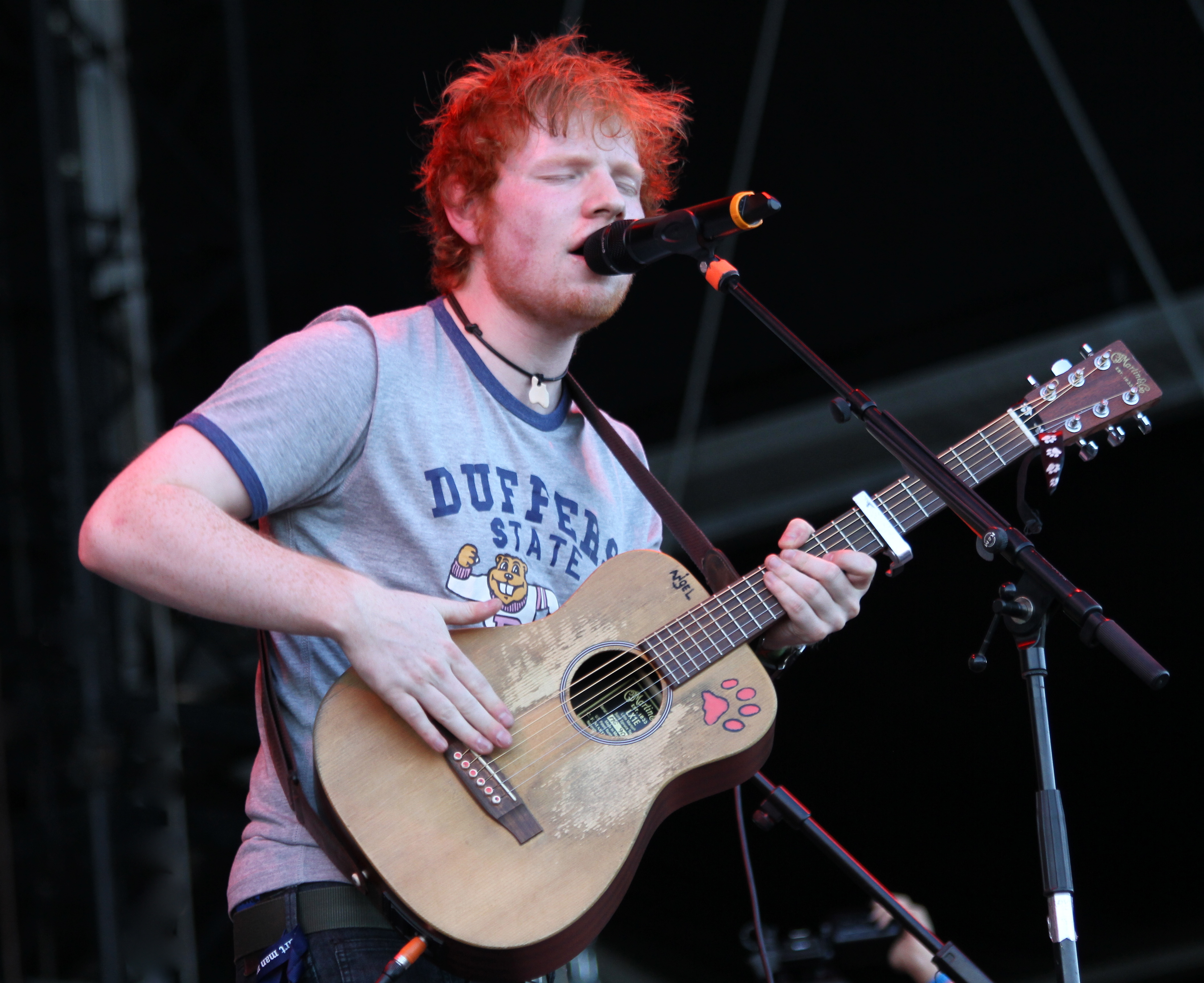
Ed Sheeran had four UK top 10 singles this year. These included his number-one solo hits "Sing" and "Thinking Out Loud" (which became the fifth best seller of 2014), as well as a guest appearance on "Do They Know It's Christmas?" with Band Aid 30.

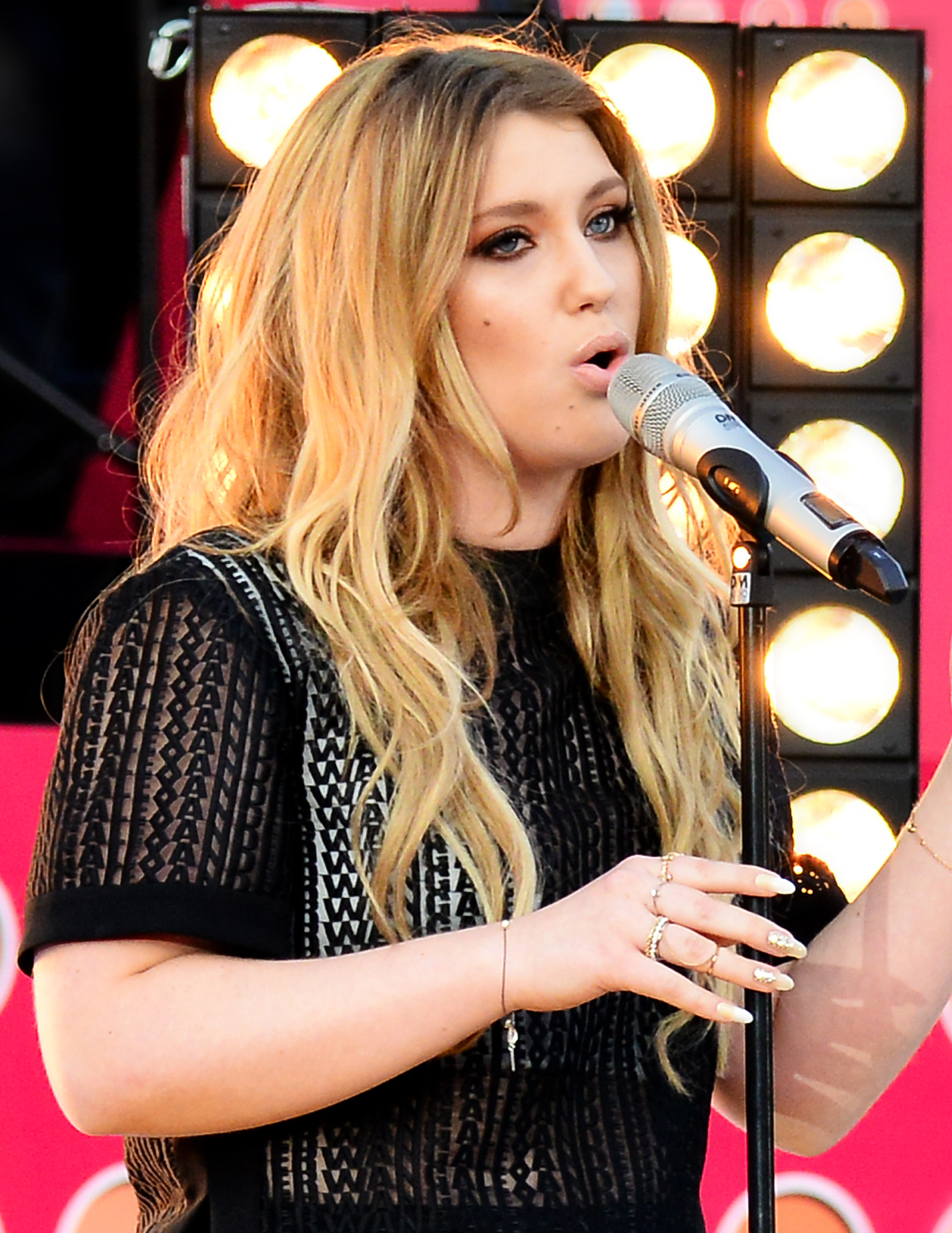
Ella Henderson, who finished in sixth place in the ninth series of The X Factor, achieved two top 10 hits in 2014, including her debut single "Ghost", which debuted at number-one in June and became the year's sixth best selling single.

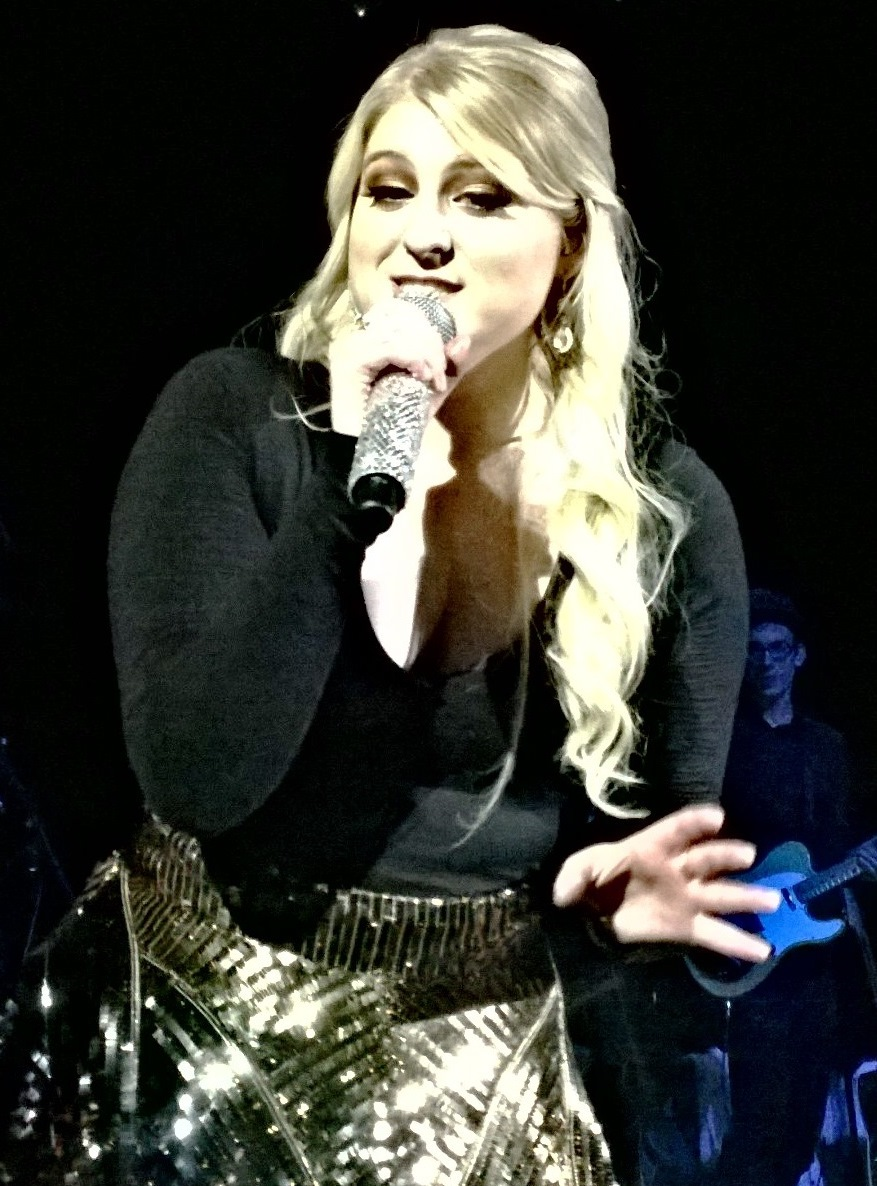
Meghan Trainor made her UK top 10 debut in October of this year with "All About That Bass", which spent four weeks at number-one and became one of the biggest selling singles of the year.

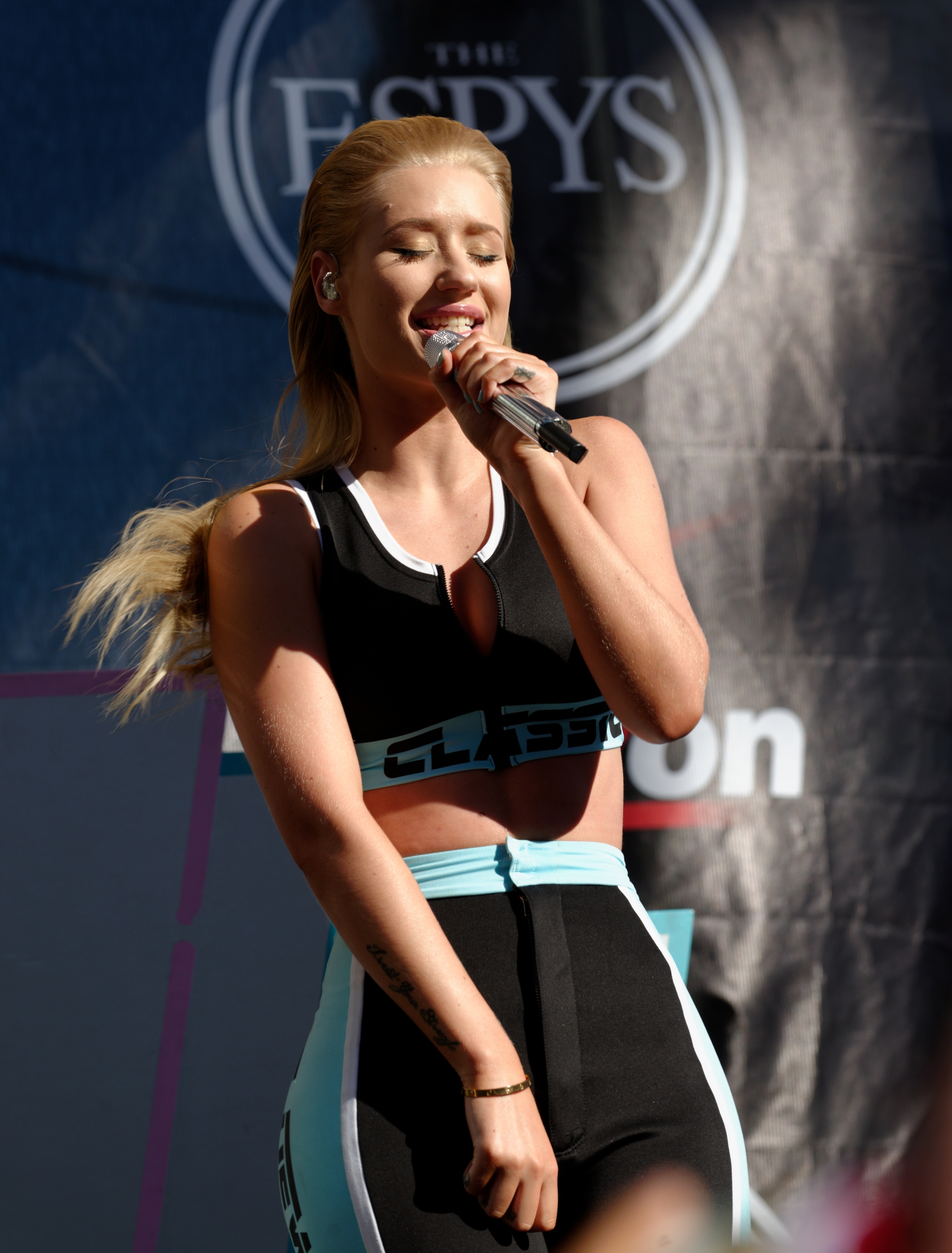
Australian rapper Iggy Azalea scored three UK top singles in 2014, including "Problem", a collaboration with American singer Ariana Grande, which reached number-one for one week in July.

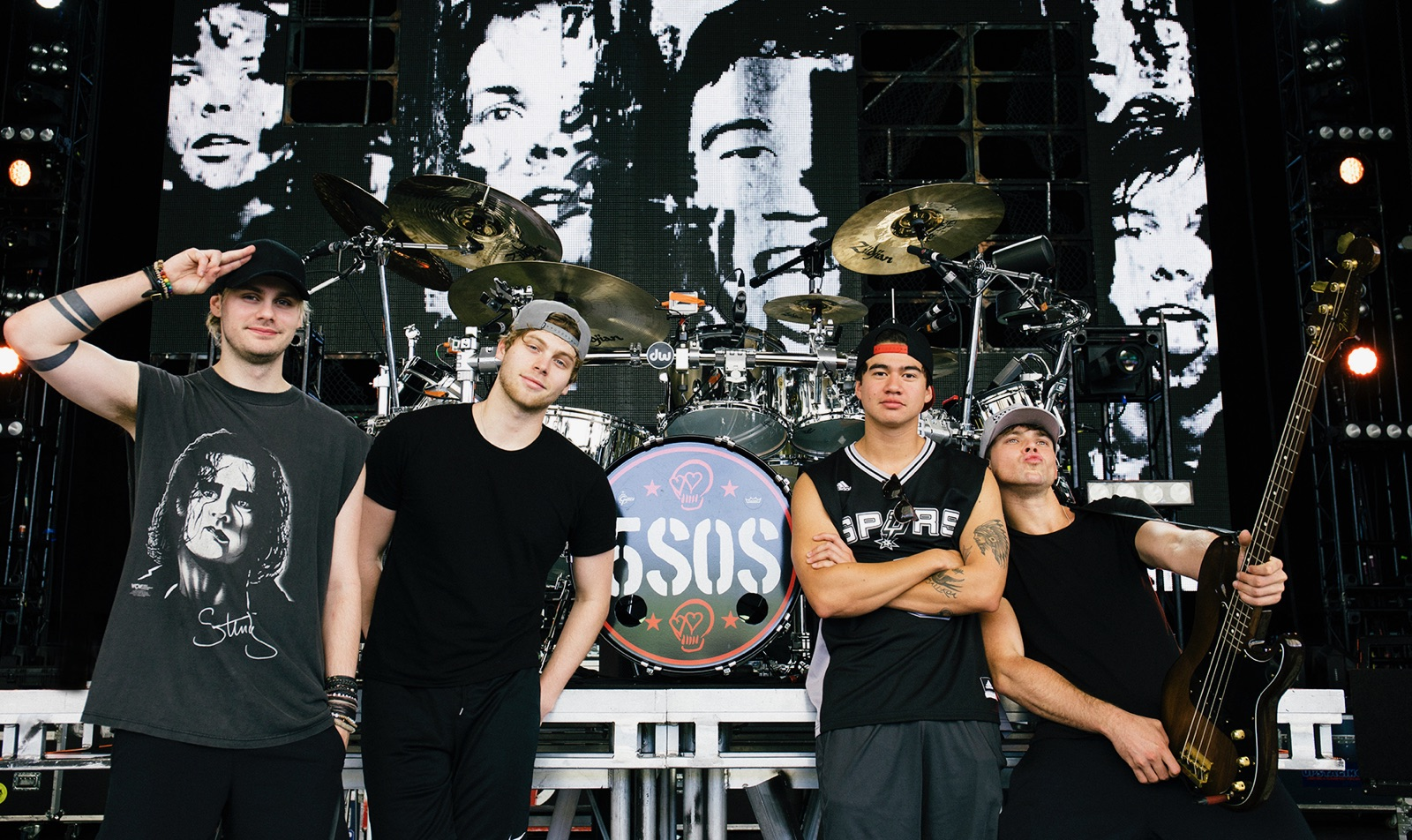
Another Australian act who made it big this year was 5 Seconds of Summer, who achieved three UK top 10 entries, including the number-one hit "She Looks So Perfect".

The following table shows artists who achieved two or more top 10 entries in 2014, including singles that reached their peak in 2013. The figures include both main artists and featured artists, while appearances on ensemble charity records are also counted for each artist. The total number of weeks an artist spent in the top ten in 2014 is also shown.

Entries	Artist	Weeks	Singles
5	Sam Smith ^{[U]}	29	"Do They Know It's Christmas?", "I'm Not the Only One", "Like I Can", "Money on My Mind", "Stay with Me"
4	Ed Sheeran ^{[U]}	33	"Do They Know It's Christmas?", "Don't", "Sing", "Thinking Out Loud"
4	Ellie Goulding ^{[U]}^{[V]}^{[W]}	21	"Beating Heart", "Do They Know It's Christmas?", "How Long Will I Love You?", "Outside"
4	Grace Chatto ^{[U]}^{[X]}	20	"Do They Know It's Christmas?", "Extraordinary", "Rather Be", "Real Love"
4	Harry Styles ^{[U]}^{[W]}^{[Y]}	22	"Do They Know It's Christmas?", "Night Changes", "Steal My Girl", "Story of My Life"
4	Jack Patterson ^{[U]}^{[X]}	20	"Do They Know It's Christmas?", "Extraordinary", "Rather Be", "Real Love"
4	Jess Glynne ^{[Z]}	26	"My Love", "Rather Be", "Real Love", "Right Here"
4	Jack Patterson ^{[U]}^{[X]}	20	"Do They Know It's Christmas?", "Extraordinary", "Rather Be", "Real Love"
4	Liam Payne ^{[U]}^{[W]}^{[Y]}	22	"Do They Know It's Christmas?", "Night Changes", "Steal My Girl", "Story of My Life"
4	Louis Tomlinson ^{[P]}^{[W]}^{[Y]}	22	"Do They Know It's Christmas?", "Night Changes", "Steal My Girl", "Story of My Life"
4	Niall Horan ^{[U]}^{[W]}^{[Y]}	22	"Do They Know It's Christmas?", "Night Changes", "Steal My Girl", "Story of My Life"
4	Paloma Faith ^{[U]}^{[AA]}	15	"Can't Rely on You", "Changing", "Do They Know It's Christmas?", "Only Love Can Hurt Like This"
4	The Vamps	4	"Last Night", "Oh Cecilia (Breaking My Heart)", "Somebody to You", "Wild Heart"
4	Zayn Malik ^{[U]}^{[W]}^{[Y]}	22	"Do They Know It's Christmas?", "Night Changes", "Steal My Girl", "Story of My Life"
3	5 Seconds of Summer	4	"Amnesia", "Don't Stop, "She Looks So Perfect"
3	Calvin Harris	19	"Blame", "Outside", "Summer"
3	Chris Martin ^{[U]}^{[BB]}	5	"A Sky Full of Stars", "Do They Know It's Christmas?", "Magic"
3	Clean Bandit	17	"Extraordinary", "Rather Be", "Real Love"
3	David Guetta	8	"Dangerous", "Lovers on the Sun", "Shot Me Down"
3	Fuse ODG	7	"Dangerous Love", "Million Pound Girl (Badder Than Bad)", "T.I.N.A."
3	Iggy Azalea ^{[CC]}	17	"Black Widow", "Fancy", "Problem"
3	Olly Murs ^{[U]}	15	"Do They Know It's Christmas?", "Up", "Wrapped Up"
3	One Direction ^{[U]}^{[W]}	19	"Night Changes", "Steal My Girl", "Story of My Life"
3	OneRepublic ^{[W]}	6	"Counting Stars", "If I Lose Myself", "Love Runs Out"
3	Pitbull ^{[DD]}	12	"I'm a Freak", "Timber", "Wild Wild Love"
3	Rita Ora ^{[U]}^{[EE]}	12	"Black Widow", "Do They Know It's Christmas?", "I Will Never Let You Down"
2	Ariana Grande	14	"Bang Bang", "Problem"
2	Charli XCX ^{[FF]}	9	"Boom Clap", "Fancy"
2	Cheryl	6	"Crazy Stupid Love", "I Don't Care"
2	Chris Brown	2	"Loyal", "New Flame"
2	Coldplay	2	"A Sky Full of Stars", "Magic"
2	Demi Lovato ^{[GG]}	8	"Somebody to You", "Up"
2	DJ Fresh	4	"Dibby Dibby Sound", "Make U Bounce"
2	Duke Dumont	6	"I Got U", "Won't Look Back"
2	Ella Henderson	12	"Ghost", "Glow"
2	Eminem ^{[W]}	5	"Guts Over Fear", "The Monster"
2	George Ezra	15	"Blame It on Me", "Budapest"
2	Gorgon City	4	"Here for You", "Ready for Your Love"
2	Jason Derulo ^{[HH]}	12	"Trumpets", "Wiggle"
2	Jessie J ^{[II]}	8	"Bang Bang", "Calling All Hearts"
2	Katy Perry ^{[W]}	9	"Dark Horse", "Roar"
2	Kiesza	7	"Giant in My Heart", "Hideaway"
2	Lily Allen ^{[W]}	2	"Air Balloon", "Somewhere Only We Know"
2	Little Mix	2	"Salute", "Word Up!"
2	Martin Garrix ^{[W]}	3	"Animals", "Wizard"
2	Melissa Steel ^{[JJ]}	2	"I Loved You", "Kisses for Breakfast"
2	Neon Jungle	4	"Braveheart", "Welcome to the Jungle"
2	Nicki Minaj	8	"Anaconda", "Bang Bang"
2	Oliver Heldens	5	"Gecko (Overdrive)", "Last All Night (Koala)"
2	Sam Martin ^{[KK]}	6	"Dangerous", "Lovers on the Sun"
2	Sia ^{[LL]}	3	"Chandelier", "Guts Over Fear"
2	Sigma	12	"Changing", "Nobody to Love"
2	Taylor Swift	17	"Blank Space", "Shake It Off"
2	Tiësto	4	"Red Lights", "Wasted"
2	Tinie Tempah ^{[MM]}	7	"Crazy Stupid Love", "Tsunami (Jump)"
2	Union J	2	"Tonight (We Live Forever)", "You Got It All"
2	Usher ^{[NN]}	2	"Good Kisser", "New Flame"
2	will.i.am	8	"Feelin' Myself", "It's My Birthday"

== Notes ==
- ^{a} "Roar" re-entered the top 10 at number 8 on 4 January 2014 (week ending).
- ^{b} "Counting Stars" re-entered the top 10 at number 10 on 4 January 2014 (week ending).
- ^{c} "Animals" re-entered the top 10 at number 8 on 11 January 2014 (week ending).
- ^{d} "Drunk in Love" re-entered the top 10 at number 9 on 8 February 2014 (week ending).
- ^{e} "Dark Horse" re-entered the top 10 at number 10 on 19 April 2014 (week ending).
- ^{f} "All of Me" re-entered the top 10 at number 4 on 15 November 2014 (week ending).
- ^{g} "I'm a Freak" re-entered the top 10 at number 9 on 12 April 2014 (week ending).
- ^{h} Released as the official single for Sport Relief.
- ^{i} "Fancy" re-entered the top 10 at number 9 on 10 May 2014 (week ending).
- ^{j} "Noble England" was originally released in 2010, but charted at number 7 following Mayall's death on 9 June 2014 (week ending).
- ^{k} "Budapest" re-entered the top 10 at number 10 on 11 October 2014 (week ending).
- ^{l} "I'm Not the Only One" re-entered the top 10 at number 10 on 1 November 2014 (week ending).
- ^{m} "All About That Bass" re-entered the top 10 at number 10 on 6 December 2014 (week ending) and again at number 10 on 27 December 2014 (week ending).
- ^{n} "Steal My Girl" re-entered the top 10 at number 7 on 8 November 2014 (week ending).
- ^{o} "Outside" re-entered the top 10 at number 10 on 13 December 2014 (week ending).
- ^{p} Released as the official single for Children in Need.
- ^{q} “Real Love” was used by ‘’John Lewis’’ in their Christmas television advertising campaign.
- ^{r} “Real Love” was a cover of the last single officially released by The Beatles.
- ^{s} "Do They Know It's Christmas??" re-entered the top 10 at number 3 on 20 December 2014 (week ending).
- ^{t} Released as a charity single by Band Aid 30 to aid the Ebola crisis in Western Africa.
- ^{u} Figure includes an appearance on the "Do They Know It's Christmas?" charity single by Band Aid.
- ^{v} Figure includes appearance on Calvin Harris' "Outside".
- ^{w} Figure includes song that peaked in 2013.
- ^{x} Figure includes three top 10 hits with the group Clean Bandit.
- ^{y} Figure includes three top 10 hits with the group One Direction.
- ^{z} Figure includes appearances on Route 94's "My Love" and Clean Bandit's "Rather Be".
- ^{aa} Figure includes appearance on Sigma's "Changing".
- ^{bb} Figure includes two top 10 singles with the group Coldplay.
- ^{cc} Figure includes appearance on Ariana Grande's "Problem".
- ^{dd} Figure includes appearance on Enrique Iglesias' "I'm a Freak".
- ^{ee} Figure includes appearance on Iggy Azalea's "Black Widow".
- ^{ff} Figure includes appearance on Iggy Azalea's "Fancy".
- ^{gg} Figure includes appearances on The Vamps' "Somebody to You" and Olly Murs' "Up".
- ^{hh} Figure includes single that first charted in 2013 but peaked in 2014.
- ^{ii} Figure includes appearance on DJ Cassidy's "Calling All Hearts".
- ^{jj} Figure includes appearance on Blonde's "I Loved You".
- ^{kk} Figure includes appearances on David Guetta's "Dangerous" and "Lovers on the Sun".
- ^{ll} Figure includes appearance on Eminem's "Guts Over Fear".
- ^{mm} Figure includes appearance on DVBBS and Borgeous' "Tsunami (Jump)".
- ^{nn} Figure includes appearance on Chris Brown's "New Flame".

== See also ==
- 2014 in British music
- List of number-one singles from the 2010s (UK)
