= 2014 in British music charts =

This is a summary of the year 2014 in British music charts.

The UK Singles Chart and UK Albums Chart are two of many music charts compiled by the Official Charts Company (OCC) that calculates the best-selling singles/albums of the week in the United Kingdom. Since 2004 the chart has been based on the sales of both physical singles/albums and digital downloads, with airplay figures excluded from the official chart. From 6 July (chart dated week ending 12 July covering the sales in the first week of July), audio streaming became incorporated into the singles chart which means that a song gets the equivalent of one 'chart sale' if it is streamed 100 times. The OCC continues to compile a sales (only) chart and a streaming (only) chart. A total of 38 singles (the most since 2000) and 32 albums have claimed the top spot in 2014.

== Number one artists ==
In the singles chart, Pharrell Williams, Clean Bandit, Sam Smith, Route 94, DVBBS, Borgeous, 5 Seconds of Summer, Aloe Blacc, Sigma, Kiesza, Mr Probz, Secondcity, Ed Sheeran, Ella Henderson, Oliver Heldens, Ariana Grande, Rixton, Magic!, Nico & Vinz, Lilly Wood, Nicki Minaj, Meghan Trainor, Gareth Malone's All Star Choir, Band Aid 30, Mark Ronson and Ben Haenow have all claimed their first number 1 single as a lead artist. Williams (with "Get Lucky" and "Blurred Lines"), Smith (with "La La La"), and Blacc (not credited; with "Wake Me Up") had all reached number one as featured artists prior to 2014.

In the albums chart, Robbie Williams and Bastille returned to the top of the charts, having reached number 1 in 2013 with Swings Both Ways and Bad Blood. You Me at Six, Bombay Bicycle Club, Katy B, Pharrell Williams, Elbow, Sam Bailey, Sam Smith, Collabro, Royal Blood, alt-J, George Ezra, Ella Henderson and Ben Howard have all claimed their first number 1 album.

"Rather Be" by Clean Bandit featuring Jess Glynne, "Happy" by Pharrell Williams and "All About That Bass" by Meghan Trainor have all spent the most weeks at number 1 in the singles chart with four and x by Ed Sheeran has spent the most weeks at number 1 in the albums chart with eleven.

== Notable events and records ==
"Happy" by Pharrell Williams became the first song released in the 2010s to be certified triple platinum based on sales of more than 1.55 million and 25 million streams by July. With "Happy", Williams is the only act apart from The Beatles to achieve three million-selling singles in a 12-month period. "Happy" also became only the third single in chart history, and the first for over 50 years, to return to number 1 more than once.

Cheryl broke the record for the most number one singles for a British female solo artist on 2 November with the release of "I Don't Care". The single sold over 82,000 copies in its first week and gave Cheryl her fifth UK number one. The record was previously jointly held by Rita Ora and Geri Halliwell.

"All About That Bass" by Meghan Trainor became the first single ever to reach the top 40 on streams alone.

"Thinking Out Loud" by Ed Sheeran broke a record for the longest climb to number 1 within the top 40, having taken 19 weeks to reach the summit. On its return to number 1 on 13 December, it became the first song ever to peak at number 1 due to streaming, having sold less than the number 2.

The top 10 best-selling albums of the year were all by British artists.

== Number ones ==
=== Number-one singles ===
The 'sales' figures since the chart week ending 12 July include a proportion for audio streams and cannot be compared to previous weeks. See separate 'Singles sales chart' below.

Key
†	Best-selling single of the year

Chart date (week ending)	Song	Artist(s)	Sales / chart sales	References (Note: 1st ref: chart position; 2nd: chart sales (sales + streams/100))
4 January	"Happy" †	Pharrell Williams	106,904	
11 January	"Timber"	Pitbull featuring Kesha	138,891	
18 January	"Happy" †	Pharrell Williams	107,427	
25 January	"Happy" †	Pharrell Williams	117,643	
1 February	"Rather Be"	Clean Bandit featuring Jess Glynne	162,801	
8 February	"Rather Be"	Clean Bandit featuring Jess Glynne	136,952	
15 February	"Rather Be"	Clean Bandit featuring Jess Glynne	102,542	
22 February	"Rather Be"	Clean Bandit featuring Jess Glynne	79,050	
1 March	"Money on My Mind"	Sam Smith	108,013	
8 March	"Happy" †	Pharrell Williams	83,982	
15 March	"My Love"	Route 94 featuring Jess Glynne	120,770	
22 March	"Tsunami (Jump)"	DVBBS & Borgeous featuring Tinie Tempah	80,476	
29 March	"I Got U"	Duke Dumont featuring Jax Jones	112,082	
5 April	"She Looks So Perfect"	5 Seconds of Summer	94,270	
12 April	"The Man"	Aloe Blacc	88,369	
19 April	"Nobody to Love"	Sigma	121,176	
26 April	"Hideaway"	Kiesza	136,286	
3 May	"Waves"	Mr Probz	126,702	
10 May	"Summer"	Calvin Harris	100,168	
17 May	"Waves"	Mr Probz	75,537	
24 May	"I Will Never Let You Down"	Rita Ora	105,095	
31 May	"Stay with Me"	Sam Smith	108,898	
7 June	"I Wanna Feel"	Secondcity	82,050	
14 June	"Sing"	Ed Sheeran	123,864	
21 June	"Ghost"	Ella Henderson	132,360	
28 June	"Ghost"	Ella Henderson	83,022	
5 July	"Gecko (Overdrive)"	Oliver Heldens & Becky Hill	76,517	
12 July	"Problem"	Ariana Grande featuring Iggy Azalea	112,903	
19 July	"It's My Birthday"	will.i.am & Cody Wise	74,034	
26 July	"Me and My Broken Heart"	Rixton	63,478	
2 August	"Crazy Stupid Love"	Cheryl featuring Tinie Tempah	118,145	
9 August	"Rude"	Magic!	85,169	
16 August	"Am I Wrong"	Nico & Vinz	106,370	
23 August	"Am I Wrong"	Nico & Vinz	62,750	
30 August	"Lovers on the Sun"	David Guetta featuring Sam Martin	71,165	
6 September	"Prayer in C"	Lilly Wood & Robin Schulz	85,169	
13 September	"Prayer in C"	Lilly Wood & Robin Schulz	68,958	
20 September	"Blame"	Calvin Harris featuring John Newman	70,312	
27 September	"Changing"	Sigma featuring Paloma Faith	104,191	
4 October	"Bang Bang"	Jessie J, Ariana Grande & Nicki Minaj	99,837	
11 October	"All About That Bass"	Meghan Trainor	143,750	
18 October	"All About That Bass"	Meghan Trainor	100,942	
25 October	"All About That Bass"	Meghan Trainor	108,857	
1 November	"All About That Bass"	Meghan Trainor	82,163	
8 November	"Thinking Out Loud"	Ed Sheeran	89,475	
15 November	"I Don't Care"	Cheryl	82,346	
22 November	"Wake Me Up"	Gareth Malone's All Star Choir	120,312	
29 November	"Do They Know It's Christmas?"	Band Aid 30	312,928	
6 December	"These Days"	Take That	63,998	
13 December	"Thinking Out Loud"	Ed Sheeran	58,503	
20 December	"Uptown Funk"	Mark Ronson featuring Bruno Mars	118,117	
27 December	"Something I Need"	Ben Haenow	214,239	

=== Number-one albums ===
Key
†	Best-selling album of the year

Chart date (week ending)	Album	Artist	Sales	References (Note: 1st ref: chart position; 2nd: sales)
4 January	Swings Both Ways	Robbie Williams	90,938	
11 January	Halcyon	Ellie Goulding	37,507	
18 January	Halcyon	Ellie Goulding	26,456	
25 January	High Hopes	Bruce Springsteen	48,620	
1 February	Halcyon	Ellie Goulding	20,928	
8 February	Cavalier Youth	You Me at Six	32,426	
15 February	So Long, See You Tomorrow	Bombay Bicycle Club	19,646	
22 February	Little Red	Katy B	22,892	
1 March	Bad Blood	Bastille	18,334	
8 March	Bad Blood	Bastille	16,548	
15 March	Girl	Pharrell Williams	69,213	
22 March	The Take Off and Landing of Everything	Elbow	46,211	
29 March	Symphonica	George Michael	49,989	
5 April	The Power Of Love	Sam Bailey	72,644	
12 April	Education, Education, Education & War	Kaiser Chiefs	23,767	
19 April	Education, Education, Education & War	Kaiser Chiefs	16,086	
26 April	Caustic Love	Paolo Nutini	109,011	
3 May	Caustic Love	Paolo Nutini	52,651	
10 May	Caustic Love	Paolo Nutini	36,859	
17 May	Sheezus	Lily Allen	35,414	
24 May	Xscape	Michael Jackson	47,764	
31 May	Ghost Stories	Coldplay	168,048	
7 June	In the Lonely Hour	Sam Smith	101,752	
14 June	In the Lonely Hour	Sam Smith	48,538	
21 June	48:13	Kasabian	70,339	
28 June	Ultraviolence	Lana Del Rey	48,028	
5 July	x †	Ed Sheeran	182,427	
12 July	x †	Ed Sheeran	93,270	
19 July	x †	Ed Sheeran	52,152	
26 July	x †	Ed Sheeran	39,375	
2 August	x †	Ed Sheeran	33,283	
9 August	x †	Ed Sheeran	31,229	
16 August	x †	Ed Sheeran	29,741	
23 August	x †	Ed Sheeran	27,208	
30 August	Stars	Collabro	48,749	
6 September	Royal Blood	Royal Blood	65,812	
13 September	In the Lonely Hour	Sam Smith	30,081	
20 September	In the Lonely Hour	Sam Smith	30,398	
27 September	No Sound Without Silence	The Script	42,546	
4 October	This Is All Yours	alt-J	30,947	
11 October	Wanted on Voyage	George Ezra	30,061	
18 October	Wanted on Voyage	George Ezra	25,948	
25 October	Chapter One	Ella Henderson	43,824	
1 November	I Forget Where We Were	Ben Howard	44,993	
8 November	1989	Taylor Swift	90,336	
15 November	x †	Ed Sheeran	45,431	
22 November	The Endless River	Pink Floyd	139,351	
29 November	Four	One Direction	141,780	
6 December	Never Been Better	Olly Murs	92,597	
13 December	III	Take That	144,538	
20 December	x †	Ed Sheeran	152,262	
27 December	x †	Ed Sheeran	214,451	

=== Number-one compilation albums ===
Key
†	Best-selling compilation of the year

Chart date (week ending)	Album	References
4 January	Now 86	
11 January	Now 86	
18 January	Now 86	
25 January	The Trevor Nelson Collection 2	
1 February	The Trevor Nelson Collection 2	
8 February	The Trevor Nelson Collection 2	
15 February	Frozen	
22 February	I'm Every Woman	
1 March	Brit Awards 2014	
8 March	Eat Sleep Rave Repeat	
15 March	Frozen	
22 March	Now Running 2014	
29 March	Now Feel Good	
5 April	Your Songs 2014	
12 April	Frozen	
19 April	Now 87	
26 April	Now 87	
3 May	Now 87	
10 May	Now 87	
17 May	Now 87	
24 May	Now 87	
31 May	Frozen	
7 June	Frozen	
14 June	Frozen	
21 June	Eddie Stobart Trucking Songs - Trucking All Over The World	
28 June	Frozen	
5 July	Now Summer	
12 July	Now Summer	
19 July	The Nation's Favourite Motown Songs	
26 July	Frozen	
2 August	Now 88	
9 August	Now 88	
16 August	Now 88	
23 August	Now 88	
30 August	Now 88	
6 September	Now 88	
13 September	Now 88	
20 September	Now 88	
27 September	Keep Calm and Chillout	
4 October	Keep Calm and Chillout	
11 October	Keep Calm and Chillout	
18 October	Keep Calm and Chillout	
25 October	Keep Calm and Chillout	
1 November	Keep Calm and Chillout	
8 November	BBC Radio 1's Live Lounge 2014	
15 November	BBC Radio 1's Live Lounge 2014	
22 November	BBC Radio 1's Live Lounge 2014	
29 November	BBC Radio 1's Live Lounge 2014	
6 December	Now 89 †	
13 December	Now 89 †	
20 December	Now 89 †	
27 December	Now 89 †	

== Year end charts ==
=== Biggest singles ===
This chart published by the Official Charts Company on 31 December 2014 is based on sales and streams for the whole of 2014.

Position	Sales position	Title	Artist	Peak position	Sales	Streams	Combined sales (Note: Sales plus (streams divided by 100))
1	1	"Happy"	Pharrell Williams	1	1,500,000	35,000,000	1,850,000
2	2	"Rather Be"	Clean Bandit featuring Jess Glynne	1	1,130,000	39,700,000	1,527,000
3	3	"All of Me"	John Legend	2	851,000	34,900,000	1,200,000
4	4	"Waves"	Mr Probz	1	815,000	32,100,000	1,136,000
5	7	"Thinking Out Loud"	Ed Sheeran	1	735,000	27,500,000	1,010,000
6	5	"Ghost"	Ella Henderson	1	757,000		
7	8	"Stay with Me"	Sam Smith	1		29,100,000	
8	9	"All About That Bass"	Meghan Trainor	1	651,000		
9	6	"Timber"	Pitbull featuring Kesha	1	744,000		
10	13	"Budapest"	George Ezra	3			
11	12	"Sing"	Ed Sheeran	1			
12	16	"Rude"	Magic!	1			
13	10	"Let It Go"	Idina Menzel	11	636,000		
14	11	"Shake It Off"	Taylor Swift	2		0	
15	17	"Hideaway"	Kiesza	1			
16	14	"My Love"	Route 94 featuring Jess Glynne	1			
17	15	"Nobody to Love"	Sigma	1			
18	19	"Money on My Mind"	Sam Smith	1			
19	22	"Summer"	Calvin Harris	1			600,000
20	18	"Dark Horse"	Katy Perry featuring Juicy J	4			
21	29	"Am I Wrong"	Nico & Vinz	1			
22	26	"Prayer in C"	Lilly Wood & Robin Schulz	1			
23	27	"Problem"	Ariana Grande featuring Iggy Azalea	1			
24	30	"I'm Not the Only One"	Sam Smith	3			
25	25	"Bang Bang"	Jessie J, Ariana Grande & Nicki Minaj	1			
26	21	"I Got U"	Duke Dumont	1			
27		"Don't"	Ed Sheeran	8			
28	37	"Blame"	Calvin Harris featuring John Newman	1			
29	20	"Do They Know It's Christmas?"	Band Aid 30	1			
30	23	"Uptown Funk"	Mark Ronson featuring Bruno Mars	1		6,000,000	
31	33	"Fancy"	Iggy Azalea featuring Charli XCX	5			
32		"Chandelier"	Sia	6			
33	24	"Hey Brother"	Avicii	3 (Note: Reached number 2 in 2013)			
34	34	"Changing"	Sigma featuring Paloma Faith	1			
35	40	"Gecko (Overdrive)"	Oliver Heldens & Becky Hill	1			
36	28	"I Will Never Let You Down"	Rita Ora	1			
37	32	"Only Love Can Hurt Like This"	Paloma Faith	6			
38		"Blame It on Me"	George Ezra	6			
39	31	"Say Something"	A Great Big World & Christina Aguilera	4			
40		"A Sky Full of Stars"	Coldplay	8			
41	38	"Loyal"	Chris Brown featuring Lil Wayne & Tyga	10			
42		"Riptide"	Vance Joy	10			
43		"Steal My Girl"	One Direction	3			
44		"Counting Stars"	OneRepublic	10 (Note: Reached number 1 in 2013)			
45	35	"How Long Will I Love You"	Ellie Goulding	5 (Note: Reached number 3 in 2013)			
46		"Crazy Stupid Love"	Cheryl featuring Tinie Tempah	1			
47		"Black Widow"	Iggy Azalea featuring Rita Ora	4			
48		"Wiggle"	Jason Derulo featuring Snoop Dogg	8			
49	36	"Feelin' Myself"	will.i.am featuring French Montana, Wiz Khalifa & Miley Cyrus	2			
50		"She Looks So Perfect"	5 Seconds of Summer	1			

Note: figures without a reference must always be deduced from the two others according to these operations: Sales + (Streams/100) = Chart sales / (Chart sales - Sales)*100 = Streams / Chart sales - (Streams/100) = Sales

=== Biggest-selling albums ===
Position	Title	Artist	Peak position	Sales
1	x	Ed Sheeran	1	1,689,000
2	In the Lonely Hour	Sam Smith	1	1,248,000
3	Wanted on Voyage	George Ezra	1	678,000
4	Caustic Love	Paolo Nutini	1	545,000
5	Ghost Stories	Coldplay	1	544,000
6	A Perfect Contradiction	Paloma Faith	2	
7	Four	One Direction	1	
8	Never Been Better	Olly Murs	1	
9	The Endless River	Pink Floyd	1	
10	III	Take That	1	
11	1989	Taylor Swift	1	
12	Halcyon/Halcyon Days	Ellie Goulding	1	
13	Blue Smoke	Dolly Parton	2	
14	Partners	Barbra Streisand	2	
15	GIRL	Pharrell Williams	1	
16	Love in the Future	John Legend	2	
17	If You Wait	London Grammar	3 (Note: Reached number 2 in 2013)	
18	AM	Arctic Monkeys	2 (Note: Reached number 1 in 2013)	
19	Chapter One	Ella Henderson	1	
20	Bad Blood	Bastille	1	
21	No Sound Without Silence	The Script	1	
22	Royal Blood	Royal Blood	1	
23	Meet the Vamps	The Vamps	2	
24	Beyoncé	Beyoncé	2	
25	Rock or Bust	AC/DC	3	
26	Sonic Highways	Foo Fighters	2	
27	48:13	Kasabian	1	
28	Since I Saw You Last	Gary Barlow	2	
29	5 Seconds of Summer	5 Seconds of Summer	2	
30	Christmas	Michael Bublé	1	
31	True	Avicii	2	
32	The Take Off and Landing of Everything	Elbow	1	
33	The 1975	The 1975	1	
34	Love in Venice	André Rieu	4	
35	Symphonica	George Michael	1	
36	Stars	Collabro	1	
37	It's the Girls!	Bette Midler	4	
38	Night Visions	Imagine Dragons	9 (Note: Reached number 2 in 2013)	
39	Midnight Memories	One Direction	3 (Note: Reached number 1 in 2013)	
40	Melody Road	Neil Diamond	4	
41	The Power of Love	Sam Bailey	1	
42	Motion	Calvin Harris	2	
43	Home	Rudimental	5 (Note: Reached number 1 in 2013)	
44	Xscape	Michael Jackson	1	
45	Tribute	John Newman	4 (Note: Reached number 1 in 2013)	
46	Native	OneRepublic	9	
47	Moon Landing	James Blunt	6 (Note: Reached number 2 in 2013)	
48	Pure Heroine	Lorde	8 (Note: Reached number 4 in 2013)	
49	Going Back Home	Wilko Johnson and Roger Daltrey	3	
50	Queen Forever	Queen	5	

=== Biggest-selling compilation albums ===
Position	Title	Peak position	Sales
1	Now 89	1	954,000
2	Frozen	1	937,000
3	Now 88	1	701,000
4	Now 87	1	645,000
5	Disney Sing Along - Frozen	2	405,000
6	BBC Radio 1's Live Lounge 2014	1	
7	Now Christmas	2	
8	Keep Calm and Chillout	1	
9	Now Disney	4	
10	Now 21st Century	2	

== See also ==
- 2014 in British music
- List of 2014 albums
- List of UK top 10 singles in 2014
