= Sharna =

Sharna is a feminine given name. Notable people with the name include:

- Sharna Bass (born 1997), English singer
- Sharna Burgess (born 1985), Australian ballroom dancer
- Sharna Fernandez (1959–2025), South African politician
