= No Ground No Fans =

2013 song

Single by Wakes featuring The Wealdstone Raider
- Released: 18 May 2013
- Genre: Electronic, dance
- Length: 3:01
- Label: Ditto Music
- Songwriter(s): Gordon Hill

Music video
- Wakes featuring The Wealdstone Raider "No Fans No Ground" on YouTube

"No Ground No Fans" is a song by Wakes featuring British Internet celebrity The Wealdstone Raider (real name Gordon Hill). The song stems from a YouTube video of Hill taunting opposition fans at a Whitehawk F.C. v. Wealdstone F.C. football match in March 2013.

== Baptiste Saunier remix ==
French producer Baptiste Saunier remade Wakes' original track combining it with his alternative production style creating a more electronic based version, released 14 December 2014 the remix was titled "Wealdstone Raider - You Wansum" ( "Wealdstone Raider - You Wansum" on YouTube)
