= Got No Fans =

Single by The Wealdstone Raider
- Released: 14 December 2014
- Recorded: 11 December 2014
- Studio: Kiss Fm Studios
- Genre: Pop; UK house
- Length: 3:09
- Label: Wealdstone
- Songwriter: Gordon Hill

Music video
- Wealdstone Raider "Got No Fans" on YouTube

"Got No Fans" is a song by the English Internet celebrity The Wealdstone Raider (real name Gordon Hill). The song stems from a YouTube video of Hill taunting opposition fans at a Whitehawk F.C. v. Wealdstone F.C. association football match in March 2013.

Released as a charity single on 14 December 2014, "Got No Fans" entered the 2014 race for Christmas number one in the United Kingdom and charted at No. 5 in the UK singles chart on 22 December 2014, with Ben Haenow, Mark Ronson feat. Bruno Mars, Olly Murs feat. Demi Lovato, and Ed Sheeran being the only artists to chart higher.

== Chart performance ==
Chart (2014)	Peak position
UK Singles (Official Charts Company)	5
UK Indie (Official Charts Company)	1
Ireland (IRMA)	85
Scotland (Official Charts Company)	13
The Vodafone Big Top 40	3
