= Noble England =

Single by Rik Mayall
- Released: 26 April 2010
- Length: 4:12
- Label: Motivation Records
- Songwriters: Shakespeare, Peter Andrew Hall, Dave Loughran
- Producer: Dave Loughran

"Noble England" is a song by Rik Mayall. It was released in April 2010 ahead of the 2010 FIFA World Cup. The song peaked at number 7 on the UK Singles Chart and was number 1 in the UK independent charts in 2014, following Mayall's death.

== Composition ==
In April 2010, Motivation Records released Mayall's England Football anthem "Noble England" for the 2010 FIFA World Cup which he recorded with producer Dave Loughran at Brick Lane Studios in London. The release, on 26 April, was designed to coincide with St George's Day and the baptism of Shakespeare. On the track, Mayall performs an adapted speech from Shakespeare's Henry V.

== Chart performance ==
In June 2010, the official BBC Match of the Day compilation CD (2010 Edition) was released by Sony/Universal featuring Noble England. After Mayall's death in 2014, a campaign led by Jon Morter began with the aim to get "Noble England" to No. 1 during the 2014 FIFA World Cup. It rapidly climbed the official charts in the United Kingdom and reached No. 7.

== Charts ==
| Chart (2014) | Peak position |
|---|---|
| UK Singles (Official Charts) | 7 |
| UK Indie (Official Charts) | 1 |
