= Walking with Elephants =

Single by Ten Walls
- Released: 13 April 2014
- Genre: Progressive house; deep house; instrumental
- Length: 5:25
- Label: Warner Bros.; BOSO
- Songwriter: Ten Walls
- Producer: Ten Walls

Ten Walls singles chronology
"Requiem" (2013)	"Walking with Elephants" (2014)

"Walking with Elephants" is a song by Lithuanian producer Ten Walls. It was released as a digital download on 13 April 2014 by German record label BOSO and on 28 April 2014 in the United Kingdom. The song peaked to number 6 on the UK Singles Chart and also charted in Belgium. It was one of the most popular songs in Ibiza in 2014.

== Music video ==
A music video to accompany the release of "Walking with Elephants" was first released onto YouTube on 3 September 2014 at a total length of three minutes and two seconds.

== Track listing ==
Digital download
No.	Title	Length
1.	"Walking with Elephants"	5:25
2.	"Nochnoy Dozor"	6:09

== Chart performance ==
=== Weekly charts ===
Chart (2014)	Peak position
Belgium (Ultratop 50 Flanders)	4
Belgium (Ultratip Bubbling Under Wallonia)	20
France (SNEP)	130
Poland Dance (ZPAV)	20
Scotland Singles (OCC)	8
UK Singles (OCC)	6
UK Dance (OCC)	3

=== Year-end charts ===
Chart (2014)	Position
Belgium (Ultratop Flanders)	74

== Release history ==
Region	Date	Format	Label
Beatport	13 April 2014	Digital download	Boso
United Kingdom	28 April 2014	Digital download	Warner Bros. Records
