= The Wealdstone Raider =

English builder and football fan who went viral online

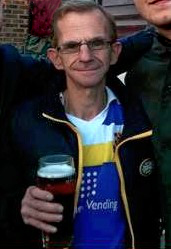
- Born: Gordon Parmar Hill; 31 January 1966 (age 60); Harrow, London, England
- Occupations: Roofer; builder; charity fundraiser; novelty singer
- Years active: 2013–present
- Height: 1.57 m (5 ft 2 in)
- Website: wealdstoneraider.net

Gordon Parmar Hill (born 31 January 1966), better known as The Wealdstone Raider, is an English builder who gained prominence as an Internet meme. A long-time supporter of Wealdstone F.C., he gained attention due to a viral video of him heckling opposing supporters of Whitehawk F.C. at a football match in March 2013, which ultimately ended in a 1–1 draw, with phrases such as "If you want some, I'll give it ya" and "You've got no fans". However, the video did not peak in popularity until December 2014.

An online article by BBC News included The Wealdstone Raider in the 'top memes and viral videos' of December 2014. The nickname "Wealdstone Raider" came from the title of the original video uploaded by YouTube user dazman21. Coincidentally, Hill claimed his brother had the nickname of "Raider" ten years prior to the upload.

== Personal life ==
A builder by trade, Hill now has over 70,000 followers on X where he has gained a reputation for light-heartedly insulting celebrities comically using his catchphrases, including Arsenal F.C. supporter Piers Morgan. He is passionate about sport.

Hill as a figure has been used as the face of various T-shirts and banners at public events such as football matches, one of which was spotted at a match between PEC Zwolle and ADO Den Haag in The Netherlands.

Following England's victory over Ukraine in the quarter-final of Euro 2020 (July 2021), Hill was arrested on suspicion of being "drunk and disorderly" and taken to Caledonian Road Police Station. No charges were made.

=== Charity work ===
For the majority of Hill's childhood and adolescence, he was treated by Great Ormond Street Hospital for toxoplasmosis. Hill has since showed his gratitude to the hospital by donating the royalties from his song "Got No Fans" to them, among other charities.

Hill apparently has already raised £500,000 for charity, including by charging fans £2 for a photo with him, and through the promotion of his charity single. Hill has an agent who takes bookings for him to appear at nightclubs and events.

== Original video ==
The original 33-second YouTube video entitled The Wealdstone Raider was uploaded to the video-sharing website on 10 March 2013, having been filmed the previous day. It features Hill at The Enclosed Ground of Whitehawk F.C., Brighton. At the start of the video Hill is shown wearing a Wealdstone F.C. football shirt and an oversized leather jacket; holding a cigarette in his right hand and a pint of beer in the other, he was being discreetly filmed at a football match by opposing supporter Darren Ward. During the early moments of the video Hill appears to become aware he is being filmed and is seen taking a number of glances towards the camera before saying a number of phrases, which he has now become renowned for, including "If you want some, I'll give it ya" and "You've got no fans". During the altercation Hill claimed that Whitehawk F.C. were "playing shit" due to the fact that they had "no fans" and were a "load of wankers". Other videos on the original uploader's YouTube channel "dazman21" depict further disputes between Hill, Ward and "Jeff", as well as other bystanders of the match.

Hill claims to have been mildly drunk whilst heckling opposing supporters at the match. He says he lost his temper due to suffering 20 minutes of personal abuse from the opposing supporters filming him at the time, who he claims were mocking his speech impediment and "funny" appearance. However, the original uploader of the viral video, Darren Ward, claims this is not the case and that he was simply filming Hill whilst he himself was under the influence of alcohol because he thought it was amusing. In an interview about the video, Ward said:

"What happened was, we saw this little bloke getting a bit rowdy at the football. So I turned to my mate Jeff and said 'We'll wind him up and video him'. I had no idea it'd go this big – everyone's gone mad for it."

As the original video gained more attention, Hill initially did not engage with it. The publicity came while his sister (now deceased) was seriously ill in America.

=== Subsequent videos ===
In April 2016, a new video of Hill being restrained by stewards at a subsequent match at The Enclosed Ground between Whitehawk F.C. and Wealdstone F.C. was uploaded to YouTube, and appeared to be part of a larger disagreement between Whitehawk and Wealdstone fans at the ground. Reasons for the exchange seem to be widely disputed, with some claiming Hill was deliberately targeted and provoked because of the success of the original video. In April 2017, another video was uploaded of Hill having an altercation outside of a Wetherspoons pub with two doormen, and it appeared Hill was in a drunken state. These videos have attracted some viewership, though they are not as widely circulated or known about as the 2013 original.

A further video, purportedly filmed during the UEFA Euro 2020 match between England and Ukraine on 3 July 2021, appears to show Hill running from police before being arrested.

== Music career ==
Various parodies, remakes and songs have since been created from the original video, this in turn influenced Hill's decision on releasing a charity single based on the viral video, saying:

"Everybody else is making money out of me, so I thought; why don't I make a few pounds for charity."

In 2014, the Daily Mirror started a campaign to get The Raider to Christmas number one, to which he obliged by recording a charity single called "Got No Fans", the royalties of which all go to the charities Great Ormond Street Hospital, Wealdstone Youth FC and the Northamptonshire-based charity Autism Concern. On 21 December 2014, the Raider charted at number 5 in the Christmas charts, led by X Factor winner Ben Haenow. However, he topped the week's UK Indie Chart. Hill dropped down to 46 in the following week's chart, the final week of the year.

== Discography ==
=== Singles ===
==== As lead artist ====
List of singles, with selected chart positions, showing year released and album name
Title	Year	Peak chart positions				Album
Title	Year	UK	UK Indie Chart	IRE	SCO	Album
"Got No Fans"	2014	5	1	85	13	Non-album single
"—" denotes a recording that did not chart.

==== As featured artist ====
List of singles, with selected chart positions, showing year released and album name
Title	Year	Peak chart positions			Album
Title	Year	UK	IRE	SCO	Album
"No Ground No Fans" (feat. The Wealdstone Raider)	2013	–	—	—	Non-album single
"—" denotes a recording that did not chart.

== Filmography ==
The media attention of which Hill has gained from the viral video and his charity single has led to an array of television appearances and interviews. In addition, stock footage of the Raider has been used by various filmmakers for several YouTube poop mash-up videos, as well as for the dubbing of a number of popular television programmes and films, including Lord Sugar's The Apprentice and the Academy Award-winning blockbuster Oliver!.

Television
Year	TV programme	Role	Network	Note(s)	Ref(s)
2013	Rude Tube	Himself	Channel 4	Series 7, episode 1 Episode aired 8 September 2013; Featured original video and a guest interview	
2014	Matchday Live with Fletch and Sav	Himself	BT Sport	Episode aired 28 December 2014 Guest appearance	
2015	Britain Sees Red: Caught on Camera	Himself	ITV	Series 1, episode 1. Featured original video and a guest interview	
