= Ten Walls =

Lithuanian musician and producer (born 1983)

- Born: Marijus Adomaitis; 19 January 1983 (age 43); Vilnius, Lithuania
- Genres: Progressive House, Deep House, Tech House
- Occupations: Record producer; DJ; Composer
- Years active: 2009–present
- Label: Runemark Records

Marijus Adomaitis (born 19 January 1983), better known by his stage names Ten Walls or Mario Basanov, is a Lithuanian producer who is best known for his 2014 single "Walking with Elephants", which peaked at number 6 on the UK Singles Chart.

In June 2015, Ten Walls was dropped from several festivals and by his booking agency after making controversial comments comparing gay people to pedophiles in a Facebook post, and referring to the LGBT community as a "different breed".

== Career ==
=== 2009–12: Mario Basanov ===
In 2012 under the name Mario Basanov Adomaitis won Best Electronic Act at Lithuanian M.A.M.A. music awards.

=== 2013–15: Breakthrough ===
On 10 May 2013 Ten Walls released his debut EP Gotham. On 9 December 2013 he released his debut single "Requiem". On 7 September 2014 he released the single "Walking with Elephants". On 10 September 2014 the song was at number 3 on The Official Chart Update in the UK. On 14 September 2014 the song entered the UK Singles Chart at number 6. The song also peaked at number 3 on the UK Dance Chart and number 8 on the Scottish Singles Chart.

== Homophobia controversy ==
In June 2015, Ten Walls posted a rant on his Facebook pages condemning homosexuality and comparing it to pedophilia. As a result of his comments, he was dropped from several festival line-ups. His booking agency, Coda Music Agency, announced that they no longer represented him. Fort Romeau pulled his support for him at London club venue Koko. Ten Walls' posts were later deleted after a backlash, and he put out an apology claiming that he cancelled the festival dates himself. Organizers of Dutch festival Pitch, Belgian festival Pukkelpop, the German festival Dockville, British festival Creamfields, and Spanish festival Sónar publicly confirmed that they cancelled Ten Walls performances due to his homophobic statements. Ten Walls also received criticism from Lithuanian LGBT activists.

Three months after his post, in September 2015, Ten Walls issued a formal apology for the incident, calling it "completely out of character".

== Discography ==
=== Studio albums ===
Title	Album details
Queen	Release: 27 March 2017; Labels: Runemark; Formats: Digital download

=== Extended plays ===
Title	Album details
Gotham	Release: 10 May 2013; Labels: Innervisions; Formats: Digital download

=== Singles ===
Year	Title	Peak chart positions					Album
Year	Title	UK	UK Dance	SCO	BEL (Vl)	FR	Album
2013	"Requiem"	—	—	—	60^{[A]}	—	Non-albums singles
2014	"Walking with Elephants"	6	3	8	4	130	Non-albums singles
2015	"Sparta"	—	—	—	72^{[A]}	—	Non-albums singles
"—" denotes a single that did not chart or was not released.

== Awards ==
On 30 January 2015 at M.A.M.A. awards Ten Walls won awards for best electronic act and best music video ("Walking with Elephants").
