= Extraordinary (Clean Bandit song) =

Single by Clean Bandit featuring Sharna Bass

from the album New Eyes
- Released: 16 May 2014
- Recorded: 2013
- Genre: Tropical house, dance-pop
- Length: 4:16
- Label: Warner; Big Beat; Atlantic
- Songwriters: Jack Patterson; Grace Chatto; Gustave Rudman; James Napier
- Producers: Jack Patterson; Mark Ralph

Clean Bandit singles chronology
"Rather Be" (2014)	"Extraordinary" (2014)	"Come Over" (2014)

Sharna Bass singles chronology
"Extraordinary" (2014)	"Buss A 9" (2018)

Music video
- "Extraordinary" on YouTube

"Extraordinary" is a song by British electronic group Clean Bandit, featuring vocals from Sharna Bass. It was written by Jack Patterson, Jimmy Napes, Grace Chatto and Gustave Rudman.

The song was issued as the fifth single from Clean Bandit's debut studio album, New Eyes (2014). The single and its remix EP were first released in Ireland on 16 May 2014, and was released in the United Kingdom on 18 May 2014.

== Music video ==
The music video was filmed in Cuba. Cellist Grace Chatto told Capital FM: "[Cuba's] an incredible country – unlike anywhere else we have ever been to. We wanted to capture the euphoric feeling of the music in sunshine and dancing. We made the video ourselves… with help from two Russian friends and some wonderful people we met out in Havana."

The video was released onto YouTube on 2 April 2014 at a total length of four minutes and seventeen seconds. The video was made by the group and features Sharna Bass, who provides vocals for the track. As of April 2018, the video has received more than 34 million views.

== Critical reception ==
The Guardian said that "there's a lot going on in the recent single Extraordinary – steel drums, pizzicato strings, rumbling timpani, cut-up vocal samples, chattering electronics – but you'd never notice, partly because the production is so polite and anaemic that it saps the constant musical shifts of their power, and partly because it's all buried underneath another rotten song, this time a kind of uplifting Emile Sandé-esque ballad: the result is about as extraordinary as branch of Tesco Express".

== Track listing ==
Digital download – single
No.	Title	Length
1.	"Extraordinary" (featuring Sharna Bass)	4:16

Digital download – EP
No.	Title	Length
1.	"Extraordinary" (Sigma Remix)	4:40
2.	"Extraordinary" (Zinc Remix)	4:47
3.	"Extraordinary" (Bontan Remix)	6:18
4.	"Extraordinary" (Klingande Remix)	5:06

== Charts and certifications ==
=== Charts ===
Weekly chart performance for "Extraordinary"
Chart (2014)	Peak position
Belgium (Ultratip Bubbling Under Flanders)	4
Belgium Dance (Ultratop Flanders)	34
Belgium Dance Bubbling Under (Ultratop Flanders)	1
Belgium (Ultratip Bubbling Under Wallonia)	17
Belgium Dance (Ultratop Wallonia)	41
Belgium Dance Bubbling Under (Ultratop Wallonia)	3
Europe (Euro Digital Songs)	12
Hungary (Stream Top 40)	33
Ireland (IRMA)	21
Italy (FIMI)	17
Netherlands (Dutch Top 40)	37
Netherlands (Single Top 100)	66
Poland Dance (ZPAV)	39
Scotland Singles (Official Charts)	7
Slovakia (IFPI)	81
Slovakia Singles Digital (ČNS IFPI)	100
UK Dance (Official Charts)	2
UK Singles (Official Charts)	5
UK Singles Downloads (Official Charts)	6

Annual chart rankings for "Extraordinary"
Chart (2014)	Position
Italy (Musica e dischi)	86

=== Certifications ===
Region	Certification	Certified units/sales
Italy (FIMI)	Gold	15,000^{‡}
United Kingdom (BPI)	Silver	200,000^{‡}
^{‡} Sales+streaming figures based on certification alone.

== Release history ==
Country	Date	Format (Version)	Label
Ireland	16 May 2014	Digital download	Warner; Big Beat; Atlantic
Ireland	16 May 2014	Digital download – remixes	Warner; Big Beat; Atlantic
United Kingdom	18 May 2014	Digital download	Warner; Big Beat; Atlantic
United Kingdom	18 May 2014	Digital download – remixes	Warner; Big Beat; Atlantic
