= Elyar =

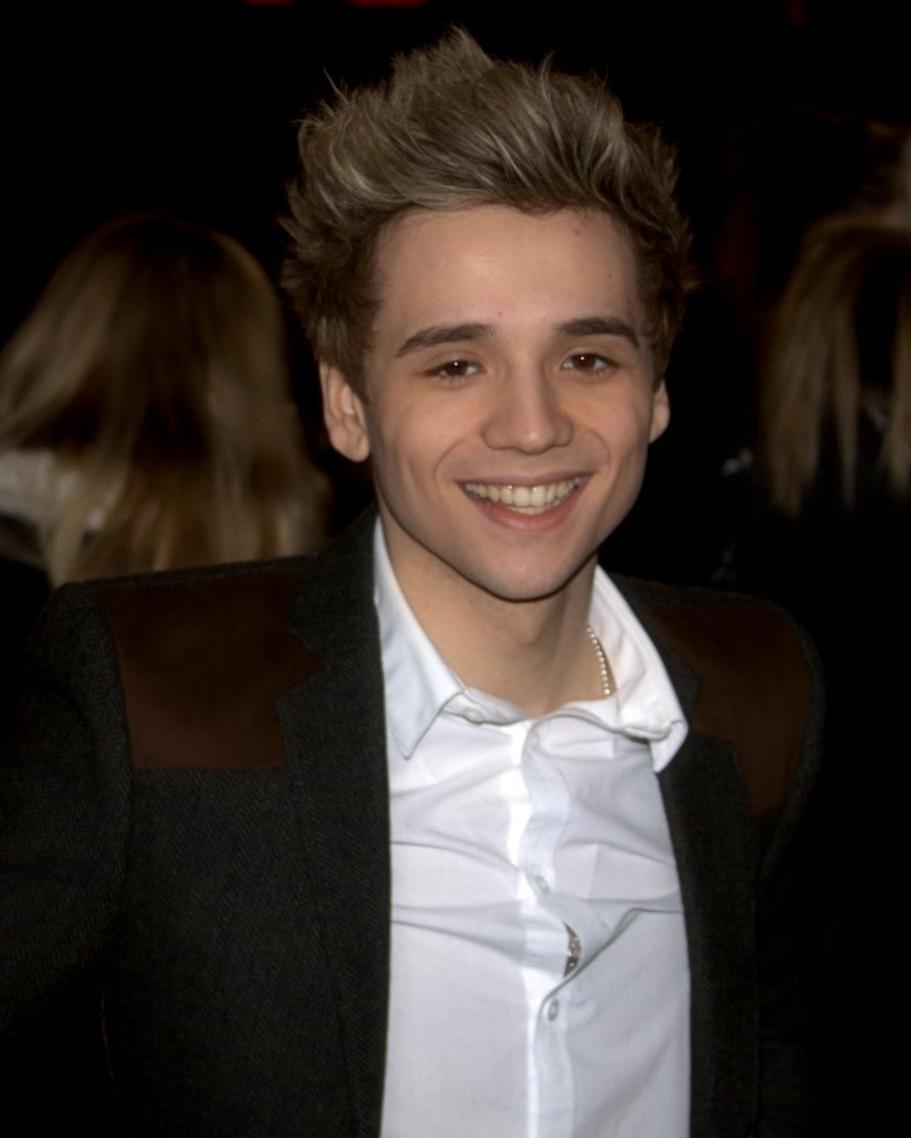
- Elyar at the premiere of Jack Ryan: Shadow Recruit in January 2014

Background information
- Born: Elyar Afshari; 15 July 1995 (age 31); London, England
- Genres: Pop; R&B; Hip hop
- Occupations: Singer; songwriter; record producer
- Years active: 2012–present
- Labels: RCA Records; Sony Music
- Website: elyar.co

Elyar Afshari (Azerbaijani: Elyar Əfşari; born 15 July 1995), known mononymously as Elyar (previously Elyar Fox) is a British-Azerbaijani pop singer. His debut single "Do It All Over Again" was released in January 2014, peaking at number 5 in the UK Singles Chart.

== Early life ==
Elyar Afshari was born in Ealing, London, to an English mother and an Azerbaijani father. He was brought up in Greenford, London, and was educated at Costons Primary School and Queensmead School. He has one older brother named Iden.

== Career ==
=== 2005–2011: Early beginnings ===
"In 2005 I got a guitar and I started to just play, and then I started to write songs," Afshari stated in an interview regarding the beginning of his career. Whilst still at school he fronted the band 'Just Me Again', and performed for the first time at The Garage in Islington in 2009. After completing his GCSEs, Afshari and his bandmates took a year off studies to focus on music. They supported You Me at Six on their British tour, including a performance at The O2 Arena.

=== 2012–present: Debut album / Debut EP ===
At the age of 16 he decided to go solo, and changed his name to Elyar Fox. He began posting videos of song covers to YouTube under the name eldoode, generating attention from people including Ryan Seacrest. With the addition of his Vevo channel, Fox has gained over 27 million views (as of October 2014). In 2012 he signed with Polydor. He spent a year in the studio, but as Polydor were not interested in releasing, he left them and soon after was signed by RCA.

On 28 October 2013, Fox supported boy band Union J at a free gig in London's Westfield shopping centre. He went on to support Union J on their tour from December 2013 to January 2014. Fox came second in MTV's Brand New for 2014, having performed at the launch at London's Drury Club.

Capital FM previewed his debut single, "Do It All Over Again", in November 2013, and premiered the single's official video in December. Fox was a surprise guest at the Jingle Bell Ball in December 2013 where he performed his debut single in front of 16,000 people. On 12 January 2014, the official release date for "Do It All Over Again", Fox was a guest on The Matt Edmondson Show on BBC Radio 1. He performed a live acoustic version of "Do It All Over Again" on BBC's Blue Peter on 16 January 2014, and a recorded duet with presenter Barney Harwood singing One Direction's "Story of My Life." Fox performed "Do It All Over Again" live on CBBC's Sam & Mark's Big Friday Wind-Up on 24 January 2014. The song peaked at number five on the UK Singles Chart and number 83 on the Irish Singles Chart.

Fox's second single, "A Billion Girls", was announced on 14 February 2014. Released on 13 April 2014, it was first played on Capital FM on 20 February 2014. A lyric video was released on Vevo on 7 March 2014, followed on the same channel by the full video on 25 March 2014.

Fox was the opening support act for The Wanted on their Word of Mouth Tour from 1 March to 14 April 2014. He was a supporting act for McBusted at an open-air concert in Hyde Park, London on 6 July 2014.

In March 2017, he returned from his long hiatus, having shortened his name to 'Elyar', and released a new single called "Beautiful Human" on Apple Music, SoundCloud and YouTube. He explained on Twitter that he had taken a long break to look for the sound that would suit him, but in order to do that he had to be independent, so he had left his management and label and started producing music from scratch in a studio built by him and his brother in their garden.

In April 2017, Elyar released his first independent debut EP called "SVFARI". This EP contains 4 songs along with his previously released song, "Beautiful Human".

== Personal life ==
Elyar has been in a relationship with fellow singer-songwriter Leadley since February 2017.

== Discography ==
=== Extended plays ===
- The 'Good Friends' Acoustic (2014)
- SVFARI (2017)
- Sappy (2018)

=== Singles ===
Title	Year	Peak chart positions			Album
Title	Year	UK	IRE	SCO	Album
"Do It All Over Again"	2014	5	83	5	TBA
"A Billion Girls"	2014	11	46	—	TBA
