= Do It All Over Again =

Single by Elyar Fox
- Released: 10 January 2014
- Recorded: 2013
- Genre: Dance-pop
- Length: 3:26
- Label: RCA Records; Global Talent Music; Sony
- Songwriter(s): Elyar Fox, Chris Young
- Producer(s): Chris Young

Elyar Fox singles chronology
"Do It All Over Again" (2014)	"A Billion Girls" (2014)

"Do It All Over Again" is the debut single by British-Azerbaijani pop singer Elyar Fox. The song was released in the United Kingdom as a digital download on 10 January 2014 as the lead single from his now shelved debut studio album.

== Music video ==
A music video to accompany the release of "Do It All Over Again" was first released onto YouTube on 10 December 2013 at a total length of three minutes and thirty-three seconds. The video shows Elyar performing the track in a massive aircraft hangar, while fans upload videos of themselves to YouTube dancing to the song. It references his own journey from performing covers on YouTube from his bedroom to filming a major label music video.

== Background ==
Talking to Digital Spy about the premiere of his song he said, "I was a little bit nervous, Obviously I was confident about it because I like the song because I wrote it, but I was like, 'What is everyone going to think?'". Talking about the song he said, "It's pop with a bit of the club element, but it still has guitars in as that's my roots. The rest of the album has different sides to it as such. There's an acoustic reggae side and then there's a slightly edgier rock side to it."

== Critical reception ==
Alexandra Pattinson of Fortitude Magazine gave the song a positive review:

"A bouncing bassline and innocent pop vocals are the main focus of the track but there is a strong beat behind it provided by synths and electronics. 'Do It All Over Again' is a great catchy pop track that will no doubt be the first big club smash of next year. With a bit more of an urban edge than other artists in his age range, Elyar Fox could have just enough individuality to survive the tough industry."

Robert Copsey of Digital Spy gave the song a negative review stating:

"18-year-old rising star Elyar Fox has been on our radar for quite some time now, but if we're honest, we're not entirely sure about his prospects as 2013's breakout act. It could be because there are already plenty of other above-average male artists already dominating the charts, or maybe it's because he's yet another new artist to be discovered via the medium of YouTube; a backstory that feels a little too '2012' for our liking. Then again, based on his debut single, it could be his incessant over-eagerness to present himself as the perfect pop package. Between its clichéd lyrics ("Let's go to a place we've never been before/ I wanna see it all"), the slick but dated electro whirring production and toe-curling music video that charts his rise from bedroom singer to selfie-obsessed popstar, 'Do It All Over Again' is the last thing we want to do at the start of 2014."

== Track listing ==
Digital download
No.	Title	Length
1.	"Do It All Over Again"	3:26

== Chart performance ==
The song has peaked at number 5 on the UK Singles Chart and number 83 on the Irish Singles Chart.

== Charts ==
Chart (2014)	Peak position
Ireland (IRMA)	83
Scotland (OCC)	5
UK Singles (OCC)	5

== Release history ==
Region	Date	Format	Label
United Kingdom	10 January 2014	Digital download	RCA Records, Global Talent Music
