= Problem (Ariana Grande song) =

2014 single by Ariana Grande featuring Iggy Azalea

Single by Ariana Grande featuring Iggy Azalea

from the album My Everything
- B-side: "Only 1"
- Released: April 28, 2014
- Recorded: 2013
- Studio: Conway (Los Angeles); Wolf Cousins (Stockholm)
- Genre: Dance-pop; R&B
- Length: 3:14
- Label: Republic
- Songwriters: Ilya Salmanzadeh; Max Martin; Savan Kotecha; Iggy Azalea; Ariana Grande
- Producers: Martin; Ilya; Shellback

Ariana Grande singles chronology
"Santa Baby" (2013)	"Problem" (2014)	"Break Free" (2014)

Iggy Azalea singles chronology
"Fancy" (2014)	"Problem" (2014)	"No Mediocre" (2014)

Music video
- "Problem" on YouTube

"Problem" is a song by American singer-songwriter Ariana Grande, featuring Australian rapper Iggy Azalea. It was released by Republic Records on April 28, 2014 as the lead single from Grande's second studio album, My Everything (2014). It was written by both alongside Ilya Salmanzadeh, Max Martin, and Savan Kotecha, being produced by the former two with Shellback, with Peter Carlsson serving as a vocal producer. "Problem" is an uptempo dance-pop and R&B song with influences of funk music, which comprises a melody based on drums, saxophone loops, and trumpets. The chorus features uncredited background vocals from American hip-hop artist Big Sean. Lyrically, Grande has stated that the song is about "the feeling of being absolutely terrified to re-approach a relationship that's gone sour – but you want to more than anything."

The song debuted at number three on the Billboard Hot 100 and sold 438,000 copies in its first week, earning Grande her biggest digital song sales week ever. The song later peaked at number two, becoming Grande's highest-charting single and Azalea's second-highest after "Fancy", which blocked "Problem" from the top spot. The song remained in the top ten of the Hot 100 for sixteen weeks and topped the US Mainstream Top 40 and Rhythmic charts. Internationally, the single debuted at the top of the charts in Ireland, New Zealand, and the United Kingdom, while peaking within the top ten of the charts in most other territories, including Australia, Canada, Mexico, Sweden, Denmark, and Greece. "Problem" became the first song to top the UK Singles Chart based on both sales and streaming.

To promote the song, Grande performed it first at the 2014 Radio Disney Music Awards, followed by the 2014 iHeartRadio Music Awards, on The Ellen DeGeneres Show and at the 2014 Billboard Music Awards. The song's accompanying music video was directed by Nev Todorovic and premiered on Vevo on May 30, 2014. It won "Best Pop Video" at the 2014 MTV Video Music Awards and has been viewed more than 1.4 billion times on YouTube as of January 2025. The song itself won "Best Song" at the 2014 MTV Europe Music Awards. As of 2024, the single has sold 3.7 million copies in the US and has been certified octuple platinum by the Recording Industry Association of America (RIAA). It ultimately reached combined sales and track-equivalent streams of 9 million units worldwide, becoming one of the best-selling singles ever.

== Background ==
Following the release of Grande's debut studio album Yours Truly in September 2013, which was met with critical acclaim, Grande announced in October 2013 that she had already begun writing and working on her second studio album with previous producers from her debut album, including Harmony Samuels, Babyface, The Rascals and Tommy Brown. Grande was initially aiming at releasing the album around February 2014. In January 2014, recording sessions for the album officially began and Grande confirmed she was working with new producers Ryan Tedder, Savan Kotecha, Benny Blanco and Max Martin. It was announced on March 3, 2014, that Grande would be featured on the fifth single from Chris Brown's upcoming sixth studio album X titled "Don't Be Gone Too Long". The single was originally set for release on March 25, 2014, but it was postponed due to Brown being sent to jail awaiting trial on assault charges. Grande announced the song's delay on March 17, 2014, via Twitter, stating "My loves... so obviously some things have changed recently... So we have to delay the dbgtl countdown, some things are out of our control". That same night she held a live stream to make up for the single's delay, where she previewed four new songs from her second album. Two days later, Grande revealed that due to the song's delay, she would be releasing the first single from her upcoming sophomore studio album earlier instead.

"I fell in love with Iggy when I saw this video of her performing 'Work' live, and I just thought she was so original and I loved the way she pronounced her words... I thought we would make the perfect girl-power duo for 'Problem', so I'm very grateful that she did it with me."

— Grande, on her collaboration with Azalea.

Grande and Azalea had originally planned for Azalea to appear on Grande's debut album in September 2013, however, it never panned out. Once Grande began working on "Problem" she thought Azalea would be the perfect fit for the track to create "the perfect girl-power duo" for the song. Azalea agreed to appear on the song and went in with producer Max Martin to write her own verse before recording it for the song. The line "one less problem without you" was inspired by an article from Cosmopolitan. Big Sean, who is featured in Grande's previous single "Right There", also appears on the song uncredited as a background vocalist in which he provides the whisper-like vocals of the chorus although he is not a featured artist. Initially while recording songs for the album, after Grande had recorded "Problem" she "fell out of love" with the song and didn't want it to appear on her second album. However, following an album listening session with her management and record label, when "Problem" came on Grande said "What the hell is wrong with me? Holy shit!", realizing her love for the song and decided to keep it for the album. Lyrically, the song is about "the feeling of being absolutely terrified to re-approach a relationship that's gone sour – but you want to more than anything."

== Release and remixes ==
After recording multiple songs for the album, Grande stated that she had chosen the first single from her album. On April 15, 2014, it was officially announced that "Problem" would be the title of the lead single from the album. Grande later hinted that Australian rapper Iggy Azalea would accompany her on the track. She created online buzz in the weeks leading up to her single's release through social media, first released promotional images from the single's photo shoot all throughout March 2014. On April 10, 2014, Grande asked her fans to choose between two new possible images to be used for the single's artwork release. After the votes were tallied, she revealed the winning cover artwork through her Instagram account the next day with the hashtag #10daystilproblem, and revealed that Iggy Azalea would be assisting her on the track. The winning image, the more seductive image of the pair, shows Grande leaning back in a foldout chair, dressed in a black camisole, white thigh-highs, and metal-tipped stilettos. Grande is also shown flipping through her hair while looking directly into the camera. The song was released at midnight to iTunes on April 28, 2014. The single was made available for pre-order on April 21, 2014. The single made its world radio premiere on On Air with Ryan Seacrest on April 28, 2014. A remix of the song was released on May 16, 2014, entitled the "Young California Remix" and features an additional rap verse from American rapper Problem. A Spanglish version of the song was also released featuring Colombian rapper J Balvin for the Hispanophone market, making it the second collaboration between the two artists. On August 11, a remix version by DJ Boss in Drama was released in Brazil featuring Brazilian pop singer Gretchen.

== Composition ==
Musically, "Problem" is an uptempo dance-pop and R&B song that incorporates elements of jazz, contemporary '90s R&B, hip hop and funk which comprises the instruments like drums, saxophones and trumpets. It runs for a duration of three minutes and 14 seconds. The song was written by Grande, Azalea, Savan Kotecha, Ilya Salmanzadeh and Max Martin, and produced by the latter two along with Shellback. Musicnotes published this song in the key of G♯ minor in common time at a moderate tempo of 103 beats per minute. The melody spans the tonal range of G♯_{3} to G♯_{5} belt and D♯_{6} in falsetto, while the music follows the chord progression of Emaj_{7}–F♯–B– Emaj_{7}–F♯–G♯m.

"Problem"
A 19-second sample of "Problem", an uptempo dance-pop song with influences of R&B subgenres that lyrically, revolves around an on-again-off-again relationship.

The track opens with a dose of "jazzy saxophones" before the more modern "horn-heavy" "drum-filled beat drops". The song's melody constantly builds toward something that "should be explosive", before Azalea brings it back down with her verse "Smart money bettin' I'll be better off without you/ In no time I'll be forgettin' all about you/ You sayin' that you know but I really, really doubt you/understand my life is easy when I ain't around you." Azalea also makes a reference to the Jay-Z song "99 Problems" at the end of her verse "There's a million yous baby boo, so don't be dumb/ I got 99 problems but you won't be one." Additionally, Grande's notes serve as a metaphor for what the song is about. She can't get rid of her crush, who she knows isn't good for her and can't help but fall in love quickly. As her "heart gets lighter and lighter", Grande sings "Head in the clouds/ got no weight on my shoulders/ I should be wiser and realize that I've got/ One less problem without you." A writer from Rap-Up describes the track as an "infectious horn-heavy jam" which features a "carefree" Ariana "declaring her independence" which also includes "an empowering verse from Iggy Azalea and a whispering Big Sean on the hook." Several critics noted a similarity between the jazzy saxophone breakdown in "Problem" and Jason Derulo's 2013 single "Talk Dirty."

== Critical reception ==
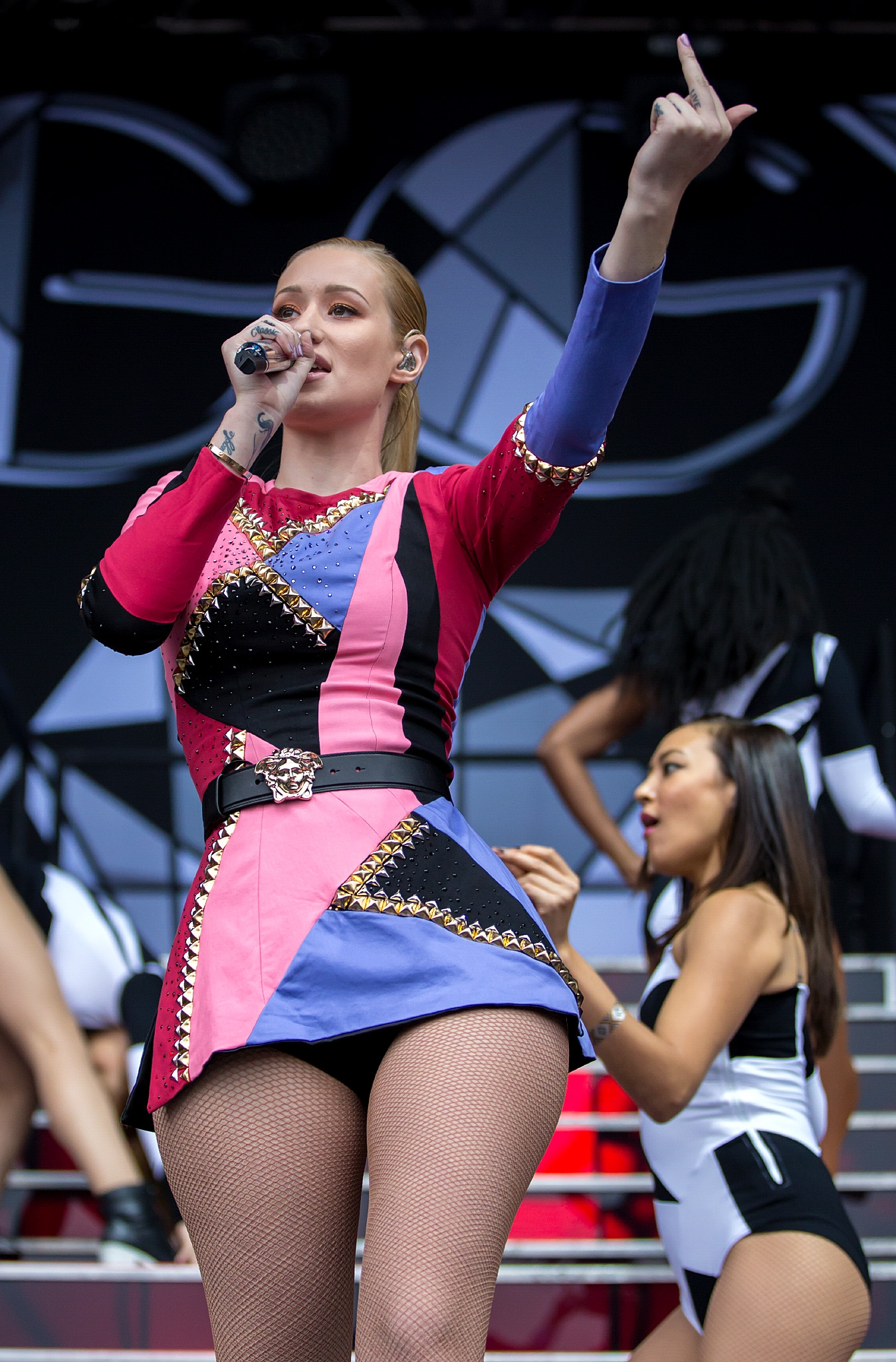
Iggy Azalea contributed a verse to "Problem".

Entertainment Weekly called the song a "dramatic reinvention," and also notes, "The idea that Grande was collaborating with bad girl du jour Iggy Azalea prompted all kinds of speculation, and the result is more or less what everybody expected: Grande's enviable pipes are still the centerpiece, but she also invites a sax-drunk loop, sexy whisper tracks, and Azalea's Jay Z-referencing high-speed verse to the party as well." Music Times commented that "the saxophone-filled track continues the pattern set by Grande's 2013 debut album Yours Truly by being heavily influenced by the '90s R&B scene. This time, 'Problem' pulls from the funky, funky streets with a jazz-influenced riff. An overwhelming (but welcome) dose of saxophone leads the song before the more modern drum-filled beat drops." In addition, 4Music said "Ariana's sweet-sounding vocals contrast brilliantly with Problem's sexy sax and Iggy's gritty rap."

Pitchfork named it "Best New Track", saying that it "bears all the hallmarks of a future smash, as if the future wasn't actually right now." Writing for MTV, Emilee Lindner praised the song's throwback sound, which Grande admits to striving for, while still keeping it fresh and modern, stating: "The song is so excitingly new but also decidedly so retro... The cranky sax, the whispered chorus, the airy harmonies and Iggy's snarky feature all tied in with a juicy modern beat." Lindner continued by calling it "the freshest pop song of the moment", commending the song's production for its "more than a few unexpected throwbacks", comparing the saxophone loops to Jennifer Lopez's 2004 single "Get Right" saying "It's the same notes over and over, but its attitude doesn't let you zone out", while the whispers in the chorus echoes to the Ying Yang Twins' 2005 single "Wait." In July 2014, Billboard listed the song as one of the "10 Best Songs of 2014 (so far)" saying that "the snappy R&B of Ariana Grande's breakout hit 'The Way' feels minimalist compared to the multi-faceted bubblegum of 'Problem'". Meanwhile, Pitchfork named it the 33rd best song of 2014. At the time of the single's release, Problem became Grande's highest-charting song on the Billboard Hot 100, peaking at the number 2 spot.

== Accolades ==
Year	Organization	Award	Result	Ref.
2014	MTV Europe Music Awards	Best Song	Won	
2014	MTV Millennial Awards	International Hit of The Year	Nominated	
2014	MTV Video Music Awards	Best Female Video	Nominated	
2014	MTV Video Music Awards	Best Pop	Won	
2014	MTV Video Music Awards	Best Collaboration	Nominated	
2014	MTV Video Music Awards	Best Lyric Video	Nominated	
2014	NRJ Music Awards	International Song of the Year	Nominated	
2014	Teen Choice Awards	Choice Music Single: Female Artist	Won	
2014	Young Hollywood Awards	Song of the Summer/DJ Replay	Nominated	
2015	iHeartRadio Music Awards	Best Collaboration	Nominated	
2015	MTV Video Music Awards Japan	Best Female Video	Won	
2015	Nickelodeon Kids' Choice Awards	Song of The Year	Nominated	
2015	Radio Disney Music Awards	Song of the Year	Won	

== Commercial performance ==
=== North America ===
Upon its release, "Problem" reached the top position on the iTunes singles chart in over 40 countries and the top ten in over 60 countries, including the United States, where it reached the summit in 37 minutes, hence breaking the previous record held by Taylor Swift, whose single, "We Are Never Ever Getting Back Together" (2012), reached the top spot on the iTunes singles chart with a record of 37 minutes, making "Problem" the fastest selling single in digital history. On April 29, 2014, Billboard reported that "Problem" would most likely sell more than 300,000 copies by the end of its first week of availability in the United States, as well as that the song could easily debut within the top 10 of the Billboard Hot 100 chart regardless of any added airplay or streaming points. In addition to its sales, which accounted for the majority of its debut chart points on the Hot 100, "Problem" began receiving early radio support. The song drew 293 first-day plays on 87 stations on the day of its release, according to Nielsen BDS. Pop Songs reporter KIIS Los Angeles led all stations with 17 first-day plays. Among all stations, "Problem" garnered 3.8 million in opening-day radio audience.

"Problem" officially debuted at number three on the Billboard Hot 100 chart on the week ending on May 7, 2014, becoming Grande's second single to debut in the top ten, and her second top ten overall at the time, the other being "The Way". It became the highest debuting song of 2014 at the time, and the highest debuting song since Eminem's "The Monster," featuring Rihanna. "Problem" boasted just 1.3% less points than John Legend's "All of Me", which claimed the Hot 100 top spot. In its second week, "Problem" fell one spot to number four despite gains in airplay and streaming, while Iggy Azalea's "Fancy" replaced it as number three. "Problem" returned to its number three peak the following week before moving to a new peak at number two in its fourth week on the chart; Azalea's "Fancy" moved to the top of both the Digital and Hot 100 charts, boasting 28% more overall chart points than "Problem". "Problem" remained in the runner-up spot the following week, holding that position for five consecutive weeks. The song stayed in the Hot 100's top 10 for the first 16 weeks of its chart run, making its number three debut on May 7, 2014, and dropping out of the top 10 on August 27, 2014.

On Billboard Pop Songs, the song debuted at number 28 and reached number 21 in its second week on the chart. It debuted at number 24 on Billboard Rhythmic Songs chart, it moved up eight places to number 16 in its second week on the chart and peaked at number one. It eventually reached number one on both the Billboard Pop Songs and Rhythmic Songs charts, becoming Grande's first number one single on both charts. "Problem" just missed the entry into the Billboard Radio Songs chart in its first week of availability. It officially entered in at number 30 on the chart, up 70% in audience impressions from 24 million to 41 million. It rocketed 14 spots to number 16 in its second week, granting it the Hot 100's top Airplay Gainer award. It reached the top 10 of the Radio Songs chart at number 10 in its third week on the chart, up 30% in audience impressions from 56 million to 73 million. The song reached a peak of Number 2 in its 7th week and remained there for 3 weeks. In addition to this, the track also debuted on the Streaming Songs chart at number nine in its first week and moved five spots to number four in its second week, with a weekly peak of 4.4 million and 6.5 million, respectively. It has since peaked at number two in its third week on the chart.

"Problem" debuted atop the Billboard Hot Digital Songs chart at number one, selling 438,000 copies in its opening week, thus earning Grande the highest first-week sales numbers of 2014 at the time and also her biggest digital song sales week ever, breaking her previous record held by "The Way", which sold 219,000 digital copies for the week ending April 5, 2013. It is Grande's first number-one single on that chart. It is the overall 9th biggest debut for a digital song and is the 5th largest by a female artist, behind Taylor Swift's "We Are Never Ever Getting Back Together" (2012), Katy Perry's "Roar" (2013), Swift's "Shake It Off" (2014) and Lady Gaga's "Born This Way" (2011). Further, at 20 years old, Grande became the youngest woman to debut with more than 400,000 downloads. "Problem" also became the highest debut for a collaboration of only female soloists since "Give Me All Your Luvin'" by Madonna, Nicki Minaj and M.I.A. debuted at number 13 on the chart following Madonna's Super Bowl XLVI Halftime Show performance in February 2012. "Problem" spent a second week at number one on the Digital Songs chart with an additional 235,000 units sold, despite a 46% drop. The song topped the chart again in its third week selling 248,000 units, before slipping one spot to number two in its fourth week on the chart, despite a 15% growth of 284,000 units. The song reached its first million sales mark in the United States on May 28, 2014. On May 29, 2014, it was certified platinum by the Recording Industry Association of America, becoming Grande's second song to be certified platinum. As of June 2020, "Problem" has sold 3.7 million copies in the United States.

In Canada, "Problem" debuted at number three on the Canadian Hot 100 on May 17, 2014, becoming her first top 10 single in that country. In its second week on the chart the song dropped 12 places to number 15. In its 3rd week the song rose back to the top 10 at number six. In its fourth week the song rose even higher to number 4. "Problem" was the first song to top the weekly Billboard Twitter Top Tracks chart on June 12, 2014.

=== Europe and Oceania ===
The song achieved global acclaim and contributed to Grande's worldwide breakthrough, reaching the summit and the top ten in several nations in the world.

In the United Kingdom, "Problem" debuted at number one on the UK Singles Chart on July 6, 2014 ― for the week ending date July 12, 2014 ― becoming Grande's fourth charting single and first chart-topper in Britain and Azalea's seventh and first respectively. According to the Official Charts Company, "Problem" made British chart history upon its debut as the first song to top the charts in Britain based on both sales and streaming, with a combined 'chart sales' figure of 113,000. In the Belgian Ultratop 50, "Problem" peaked at number 26 in Flanders and number 40 in Wallonia. It also debuted at number 22 in Switzerland, becoming Grande's first charting single in that country. It also appeared in the Netherlands at number 10, in Spain at number 11, in France at number 14, in Austria at number 31, in Germany at number 25 and in Brazil at number 87.

In New Zealand, "Problem" made its first chart appearance on the New Zealand Singles Chart on the issue dated May 5, 2014. It debuted at the number-one spot on the chart, becoming the highest debut of the week, making it Grande's first single to top the charts in New Zealand, first top debut and her second top forty single. In its second week on the chart, the song dropped two spots to number three being replaced by the songs featured artist Iggy Azalea, whose single "Fancy" featuring Charli XCX took over the top spot. In Azalea's native Australia, "Problem" gave Grande her first top 10 hit after it debuted at number four on the Australian Singles Chart, and eventually ascended to number two in its second week on the chart. It stayed in the top two for two consecutive weeks, Grande's previous best effort on the chart was "The Way" which peaked at number 37 in April 2013 and also became her second top 40 effort there. According to the International Federation of the Phonographic Industry (IFPI), "Problem" has achieved global sales of 9 millions of units (combined sales plus streaming data) as of 2015, ranking as the eighth best-selling single of 2014 and making it one of the best-selling singles worldwide.

== Music video ==
=== Lyric video ===
Grande and Iggy Azalea filmed the lyric video for "Problem" on April 10, 2014, with Jones Crow as the director. Grande assisted Crow in editing the video and completed it on April 13, 2014 and it premiered on Vevo on May 1, 2014. The video features Grande and Azalea performing in a noir black-and-white clip behind pinwheel go-go filters.

=== Official music video ===
Grande and Azalea over a colorful backdrop during the music video, which incorporates elements from 1960s art

The official music video was filmed on April 29, 2014, just one day after the single's release, and was directed by The Young Astronauts who had previously worked with Grande on videos for her singles "Right There" and "Almost Is Never Enough". Kaz James makes an appearance in the video. The video was inspired in Sweet Charity (1969), set with a retro style from 1960s art movement containing a black, white, and old-fashioned aesthetic. The video opens on a sparkling figure where Grande appears in a sequined minidress and white go go boots with her dancers backed by a spiral backdrop. Iggy Azalea is shown in front of a colorful background, and, as Jason Lipzshuts from Billboard noted, her hairstyle is reminiscent of Barbarella, while Chima Simone of E! compared her hair to Nancy Sinatra's in her "These Boots Are Made for Walkin'" (1966) video. The video contains intercepted scenes of Grande lying atop a giant spiral on a pink floor wearing a white sweater and high socks. Lia Beck from the website Bustle compared the scene to Britney Spears's "Oops!... I Did It Again" music video (2000).

=== Accolades ===
The video was released on May 30, 2014, and it surpassed 100 million views on July 28, consequently making it Grande's second Vevo-certified music video after "The Way". As of September 2024, the music video has over 1.4 billion views on YouTube. The lyric video was nominated at the 2014 MTV Video Music Awards in the Best Lyric Video category. The official music video was nominated in the Best Collaboration, Best Female Video, and Best Pop Video categories, and it ultimately won the award for Best Pop Video. It was Grande's and Azalea's first time winning a VMA.

== Live performances ==
"Problem" was first performed by Grande at the 2014 Radio Disney Music Awards on April 26, 2014, which were aired a day later on April 27, 2014. It was later performed at Jeffrey Sanker's annual White Party in Palm Springs. Grande has since also performed "Problem" at the 2014 iHeartRadio Music Awards on May 1, 2014, on The Ellen DeGeneres Show on May 6, 2014, and at the Born Free Africa Mother's Day Family Carnival on May 11. Grande has also performed the song at various concerts including the 2014 KIIS-FM's 102.7 Wango Tango annual concert alongside Azalea, for the first time performed with her on May 10, the annual Kiss 108 fm's 2014 Kiss Concert on May 31, 2014, and at the 2014 New York 103.5 KTU concert KTUphoria on June 29, 2014. Grande performed the song at the 2014 Billboard Music Awards alongside Azalea on May 18, 2014. Later, Grande performed on the season 18 finale of Dancing with the Stars on May 20, 2014 and at the 2014 MuchMusic Video Awards on June 15. She performed "Problem" at the 2014 iHeartRadio Ultimate Pool Party, and a piano version on the one-day revival of Total Request Live. On August 28, Grande performed the song at the program Today Show and also during a pocket show held at the Honda Stage at the iHeartRadio Theatre in LA. She also performed "Problem" along with "Bang Bang" and "Break Free" on The X Factor Australia on September 8, 2014. Still on September 8, Ariana performed the song at the Australian TV Show Sunrise along with Break Free. On September 12 she performed a medley version of Problem and Break Free in the Japanese TV Show Music Station. She also performed "Problem" at the iHeartRadio Music Festival on September 19, 2014. Ariana performed the song along with "Break Free" at the 2014 MTV Europe Music Awards on November 9, 2014. Ariana performed the song along with "Break Free" and "Love Me Harder" at the American Music Awards on November 23, 2014. The song was also performed at the 2014 Victoria's Secret Fashion Show, which was held at Earls Court in London on December 2, 2014. "Problem" was included on the setlist for Grande's 2015 The Honeymoon Tour as a closing song with the lyric video playing in the background. In 2017, Grande performed a remixed version of the song during the Dangerous Woman Tour.

== Cover versions ==
In July of the same year, English band Rixton released a cover of "Problem". Idolator wrote they "replaced the brass-heavy original with soulful harmonies, snaps and nasty guitar licks. No Iggy section to be found here, but with lead singer Jake's powerful chops at the forefront, the rap is hardly missed." The a cappella group Pentatonix covered the song on their album PTX Vol. 3, released on September 23, 2014. Entertainment Weekly noted the cover was more "low-key" than the original version. Billboard said it was "catchy".

== Formats and track listings ==
- CD
1. "Problem" – 3:14
2. "Problem" (Dawin remix) – 3:25
3. "Problem" (Noodles & Devastator remix) – 3:12
4. "Problem" (Kassiano remix) – 4:21
- Digital download
1. "Problem" – 3:13
- Digital download
1. "Problem" (featuring Iggy Azalea and J Balvin) – 3:13
- Digital download (the remixes)
1. "Problem" (Dawin remix) – 3:25
2. "Problem" (Noodles & Devastator remix) – 3:12
3. "Problem" (Kassiano remix) – 4:21
- 7-inch vinyl
1. "Problem" - 3:13
2. "Only 1" - 3:13

== Credits and personnel ==
Credits adapted from My Everything liner notes.

Recording

- Recorded at Conway Recording Studios (Los Angeles, California) and Wolf Cousins Studio (Stockholm, Sweden)
- Mixed at MixStar Studios (Virginia Beach, Virginia)
- Mastered at Sterling Sound (New York City, New York)

Management

- Wolf Cousins (STIM), Warner Chappell Music Scandinavia, AB (STIM), MXM (administered by Kobalt), Grand Hustle Publishing, Grandarimusic Publishing (ASCAP), MXM (administered by Kobalt) (ASCAP)
- Iggy Azalea appears courtesy of Virgin EMI Records, under exclusive license in the United States to Def Jam Recordings
- Big Sean appears courtesy of Def Jam Recordings

Personnel

- Ariana Grande – lead vocals, songwriting
- Iggy Azalea – featured vocals, songwriting
- Big Sean – backing vocals
- Max Martin – songwriting, production for MXM Productions, vocal production, keys, programming
- Ilya – songwriting, production for Wolf Cousins Productions, guitar, bass, keys, programming, backing vocals
- Savan Kotecha – songwriting, backing vocals
- Shellback – production for Wolf Cousins Productions, keys, programming
- Peter Carlsson – vocal production, engineering
- Sam Holland – engineering
- Serban Ghenea – mixing
- John Hanes – mixing engineering
- Tom Coyne – mastering
- Aya Merrill – mastering
- Leon Silva – saxophone

== Charts ==
=== Weekly charts ===
Chart (2014–15)	Peak position
Australia (ARIA)	2
Austria (Ö3 Austria Top 40)	16
Belgium (Ultratop 50 Flanders)	15
Belgium Urban (Ultratop Flanders)	2
Belgium (Ultratop 50 Wallonia)	11
Brazil (Billboard Brasil Hot 100)	79
Canada Hot 100 (Billboard)	3
Canada AC (Billboard)	33
Canada CHR/Top 40 (Billboard)	1
Canada Hot AC (Billboard)	5
Czech Republic Airplay (ČNS IFPI)	17
Czech Republic Singles Digital (ČNS IFPI)	5
Denmark (Tracklisten)	5
Euro Digital Song Sales (Billboard)	1
Finland (Suomen virallinen lista)	6
France (SNEP)	14
France Airplay (SNEP)	4
Germany (GfK)	19
Greece Digital Songs (Billboard)	3
Hong Kong (HKRIA)	29
Hungary (Rádiós Top 40)	26
Hungary (Single Top 40)	31
Hungary (Stream Top 40)	2
Indonesia (ASIRI)	5
Ireland (IRMA)	1
Israel International Airplay (Media Forest)	1
Italy (FIMI)	12
Japan Hot 100 (Billboard)	16
Lebanon (OLT20)	2
Mexico (Billboard Mexican Airplay)	4
Mexico Anglo (Monitor Latino)	2
Netherlands (Dutch Top 40)	5
Netherlands (Single Top 100)	10
New Zealand (Recorded Music NZ)	1
Norway (VG-lista)	6
Poland Airplay (ZPAV)	6
Romania Airplay (Media Forest)	10
Scottish Singles Sales (Official Charts)	1
Slovakia Airplay (ČNS IFPI)	25
Slovakia Singles Digital (ČNS IFPI)	8
Slovenia (SloTop50)	40
South Africa Airplay (EMA)	7
South Korea (Gaon)	4
Spain (Promusicae)	11
Sweden (Sverigetopplistan)	5
Switzerland (Schweizer Hitparade)	8
UK Singles (Official Charts)	1
US Billboard Hot 100	2
US Adult Contemporary (Billboard)	15
US Adult Pop Airplay (Billboard)	8
US Dance Airplay (Billboard)	2
US Dance Club Songs (Billboard)	12
US Latin Pop Airplay (Billboard)	32
US Pop Airplay (Billboard)	1
US Rhythmic Airplay (Billboard)	1
Venezuela (Record Report)	87

=== Year-end charts ===
Chart (2014)	Position
Australia (ARIA)	18
Austria (Ö3 Austria Top 40)	59
Belgium (Ultratop 50 Flanders)	52
Belgium Urban (Ultratop Flanders)	9
Belgium (Ultratop 50 Wallonia)	71
Brazil (Hot 100 Brasil)	27
Canada (Canadian Hot 100)	18
Denmark (Tracklisten)	25
France (SNEP)	69
Germany (Official German Charts)	65
Italy (FIMI)	35
Japan (Japan Hot 100)	45
Japan Adult Contemporary (Billboard)	9
Netherlands (Dutch Top 40)	29
Netherlands (Single Top 100)	22
New Zealand (Recorded Music NZ)	19
Sweden (Sverigetopplistan)	30
Switzerland (Schweizer Hitparade)	47
South Korea (Gaon Chart International)	6
Taiwan (Hito Radio)	14
UK Singles (Official Charts Company)	23
US Billboard Hot 100	9
US Adult Contemporary (Billboard)	41
US Adult Top 40 (Billboard)	34
US Dance/Mix Show Airplay (Billboard)	37
US Mainstream Top 40 (Billboard)	10
US Rhythmic (Billboard)	10
Chart (2015)	Position
Belgium Urban (Ultratop Flanders)	42
South Korea (Gaon Chart)	58
South Korea (Gaon Chart International)	5
Chart (2016)	Position
South Korea (Gaon Chart International)	25
Chart (2017)	Position
South Korea (Gaon Chart International)	41
Chart (2018)	Position
South Korea (Gaon Chart International)	65

== Certifications and sales ==
Region	Certification	Certified units/sales
Australia (ARIA)	6× Platinum	420,000^{‡}
Austria (IFPI Austria)	Platinum	30,000^{*}
Brazil (Pro-Música Brasil)	2× Diamond	500,000^{‡}
Canada (Music Canada)	4× Platinum	320,000^{‡}
Germany (BVMI)	Platinum	300,000^{‡}
Italy (FIMI)	2× Platinum	60,000^{‡}
Japan (RIAJ)	Platinum	250,000^{*}
Mexico (AMPROFON)	Gold	30,000^{*}
Netherlands (NVPI)	2× Platinum	40,000^{^}
New Zealand (RMNZ)	3× Platinum	90,000^{‡}
Norway (IFPI Norway)	4× Platinum	240,000^{‡}
Portugal (AFP)	Gold	5,000^{‡}
South Korea	—	2,018,511
Spain (Promusicae)	Platinum	40,000^{‡}
Sweden (GLF)	3× Platinum	120,000^{‡}
Switzerland (IFPI Switzerland)	Gold	15,000^{‡}
United Kingdom (BPI)	2× Platinum	1,200,000^{‡}
United States (RIAA)	8× Platinum	8,000,000
Streaming
Denmark (IFPI Danmark)	2× Platinum	5,200,000^{†}
Japan (RIAJ)	Platinum	100,000,000^{†}
Spain (Promusicae)	Platinum	8,000,000^{†}
Summaries
Worldwide (IFPI)	—	9,000,000
^{*} Sales figures based on certification alone.^{^} Shipments figures based on certification alone.^{‡} Sales+streaming figures based on certification alone.^{†} Streaming-only figures based on certification alone.

== Release history ==
"Problem" release history
Region	Date	Format(s)	Label	Ref.
Canada	April 28, 2014	Digital download	Universal	
United States	April 28, 2014	Contemporary hit radio; digital download; rhythmic contemporary radio	Republic	
Australia	April 29, 2014	Digital download	Universal	
Belgium	April 29, 2014	Digital download	Universal	
Denmark	April 29, 2014	Digital download	Universal	
Finland	April 29, 2014	Digital download	Universal	
France	April 29, 2014	Digital download	Universal	
Germany	April 29, 2014	Digital download	Universal	
Italy	April 29, 2014	Digital download	Universal	
Netherlands	April 29, 2014	Digital download	Universal	
New Zealand	April 29, 2014	Digital download	Universal	
Norway	April 29, 2014	Digital download	Universal	
Sweden	April 29, 2014	Digital download	Universal	
Italy	May 30, 2014	Radio airplay	Universal	
United States	June 10, 2014	Urban contemporary radio	Republic	
United Kingdom	June 29, 2014	Digital download	Republic	
United Kingdom	June 30, 2014	CD; radio airplay	Universal	
Germany	July 11, 2014	CD	Universal	
Various	December 6, 2024	7-inch vinyl	Republic	

== See also ==
- List of best-selling singles
- List of best-selling singles in Australia
- List of best-selling singles in the United States
- List of number-one singles from the 2010s (New Zealand)
- List of top 10 singles in 2014 (France)
- List of UK top 10 singles in 2014
- List of Billboard Hot 100 top 10 singles in 2014
- List of Mainstream Top 40 number-one hits of 2014 (U.S.)
- List of number-one dance airplay hits of 2014 (U.S.)
- List of most-viewed YouTube videos
