= Sharna Bass =

- Born: 21 May 1997 (age 29); London, England
- Genres: R&B, dance
- Occupation: Singer
- Years active: 2013–present

Sharna Bass (born 21 May 1997) is an English singer. She is featured on the Clean Bandit single "Extraordinary". Bass also has a twin brother, Sean Bass, in the industry who was also spotted by Clean Bandit and sings the vocals in their song "Stronger".

Clean Bandit found Bass when she was very young through their music production scheme; they operated out of South Kilburn Studios, and the studios had a scheme in which artists could use the studios for free if a trainee was taken on.

In 2019, Bass supported Summer Walker on her European tour. She released her debut EP, Beautiful Chaos, in February 2020.

Her influences include Frank Sinatra and The Notorious B.I.G.. She was included on Amazon Music's "Ones to Watch 2021" list.

== Discography ==
=== Singles ===
As featured artist

Title	Year	Peak chart positions								Album
Title	Year	BEL	BEL (F)	BEL (W)	EUR	IRE	SCO	UKD	UK	Album
"Extraordinary" (Clean Bandit featuring Sharna Bass)	2014	47	49	18	12	21	7	2	5	New Eyes
"Sparks" (Gramercy featuring Sharna Bass)	2017	—	—	—	—	—	—	—	—	Non-album single
"Sparks" (Marnz Malone featuring Sharna Bass)	2025	—	—	—	—	—	—	—	—	Non-album single
"—" denotes singles that did not chart or were not released.
