= Matt Terry discography =

- Studio albums: 1
- EPs: 2
- Singles: 10
- Music videos: 4

The discography of Matt Terry, an English singer and songwriter. Terry's debut studio album, Trouble, was released in November 2017. The album peaked at number twenty-nine on the UK Albums Chart. The album includes the singles "Sucker for You" and "Try".

== Albums ==
| Title | Details | Peak chart positions | |
| Title | Details | UK | SCO |
|---|---|---|---|
| Trouble | Released: 24 November 2017; Label: Syco, RCA; Formats: CD, digital download | 29 | 39 |

== Extended plays ==
| Title | Details |
|---|---|
| Closure | Released: 29 November 2024; Label: Future x MT13; Formats: Digital download, streaming |
| Party In My Room | Released: 22 May 2026; Label: Self-released; Formats: Digital download, streaming |

== Singles ==
=== As lead artist ===
| Title | Year | Peak chart positions | | | | Certifications | Album |
| Title | Year | UK | FIN (DL) | IRE | SCO | Certifications | Album |
|---|---|---|---|---|---|---|---|
| "When Christmas Comes Around" | 2016 | 3 | 14 | 28 | 2 | BPI: Silver | Non-album single |
| "Sucker for You" | 2017 | 51 | — | 83 | 52 | | Trouble |
| "Try" | 2018 | — | — | — | — | | Trouble |
| "You Don’t Know Nothing" | 2023 | — (Note: "You don’t know nothing" did not enter the Official Singles Chart, but peaked at number 22 on the Official Singles Downloads Chart.) | — | — | — | | Closure |
| "Ghost of me" | 2024 | — | — | — | — | | Closure |
| "His car" | 2024 | — | — | — | — | | Closure |
| "Boujee" | 2024 | — | — | — | — | | Non-album single |
| "Superglue" | 2025 | — | — | — | — | | Party In My Room |
| "Skittles" | 2026 | — | — | — | — | | Party In My Room |
| "Karma" | 2026 | — | — | — | — | | Party In My Room |
"—" denotes a recording that did not chart or was not released in that territory.

=== As featured artist ===
| Title | Year | Peak chart positions | | | | Certifications | Album |
| Title | Year | UK | FIN (DL) | IRE | SCO | Certifications | Album |
|---|---|---|---|---|---|---|---|
| "Bridge over Troubled Water" (as part of Artists for Grenfell) | 2017 | 1 | 25 | 25 | 1 | BPI: Silver | Non-album single |
| "Súbeme La Radio (Remix)" (Enrique Iglesias featuring Sean Paul and Matt Terry) | 2017 | 10 | — | 51 | 3 | BPI: Silver | Trouble |
"—" denotes a recording that did not chart or was not released in that territory.

=== Promotional singles ===
| Title | Year | Peak chart positions | | Album |
| Title | Year | UK | SCO | Album |
|---|---|---|---|---|
| "The Thing About Love" | 2017 | 51 | 24 | Trouble |

== Songwriting credits ==
| Title | Year | Artist(s) | Album | Credits | Written with |
|---|---|---|---|---|---|
| "Please" | 2018 | Samantha Harvey | Please EP | Background vocals; co-writer | Samuel Preston, George Tizzard, Richard Parkhouse |

== Music videos ==
| Year | Title | Album |
|---|---|---|
| 2016 | "When Christmas Comes Around" | —N/a |
| 2017 | "Sucker For You" | Trouble |
| 2018 | "Try" | Trouble |
| 2023 | "You Don't Know Nothing" | Closure |
