= The X Factor (British TV series) series 13 =

British TV competition

The X Factor
- Series 13
- Hosted by: Dermot O'Leary (ITV); Matt Edmondson (ITV2); Rylan (ITV2)
- Judges: Simon Cowell; Nicole Scherzinger; Sharon Osbourne; Louis Walsh; Mel B (guest)
- Winner: Matt Terry
- Winning mentor: Nicole Scherzinger
- Runner-up: Saara Aalto
- Finals venue: The SSE Arena, Wembley

Release
- Original network: ITV; ITV2 (The Xtra Factor)
- Original release: 27 August – 11 December 2016

Series chronology
- ← Previous; Series 12 Next → Series 14

The X Factor is a British television music competition to find new singing talent. The thirteenth series began airing on ITV on Saturday 27 August 2016 and ended on Sunday 11 December 2016. Dermot O'Leary returned to present the main show on ITV for the ninth time to replace Olly Murs and Caroline Flack, who left after series 12. Simon Cowell was the only judge from the 12th series to return; Nicole Scherzinger, Sharon Osbourne and Louis Walsh all returned, replacing Rita Ora, Cheryl Fernandez-Versini and Nick Grimshaw. Matt Edmondson and Rylan Clark-Neal replaced Rochelle Humes and Melvin Odoom as hosts of The Xtra Factor, which was rebranded as The Xtra Factor Live and was broadcast live twice every week, with Roman Kemp making appearances as a digital presenter and social media reporter. Matt Terry was announced the winner on 11 December 2016, making Scherzinger the winning mentor for the second time. Saara Aalto finished second.

== Judges and presenters ==
Judges and Presenter(s) for The X Factor Series 13

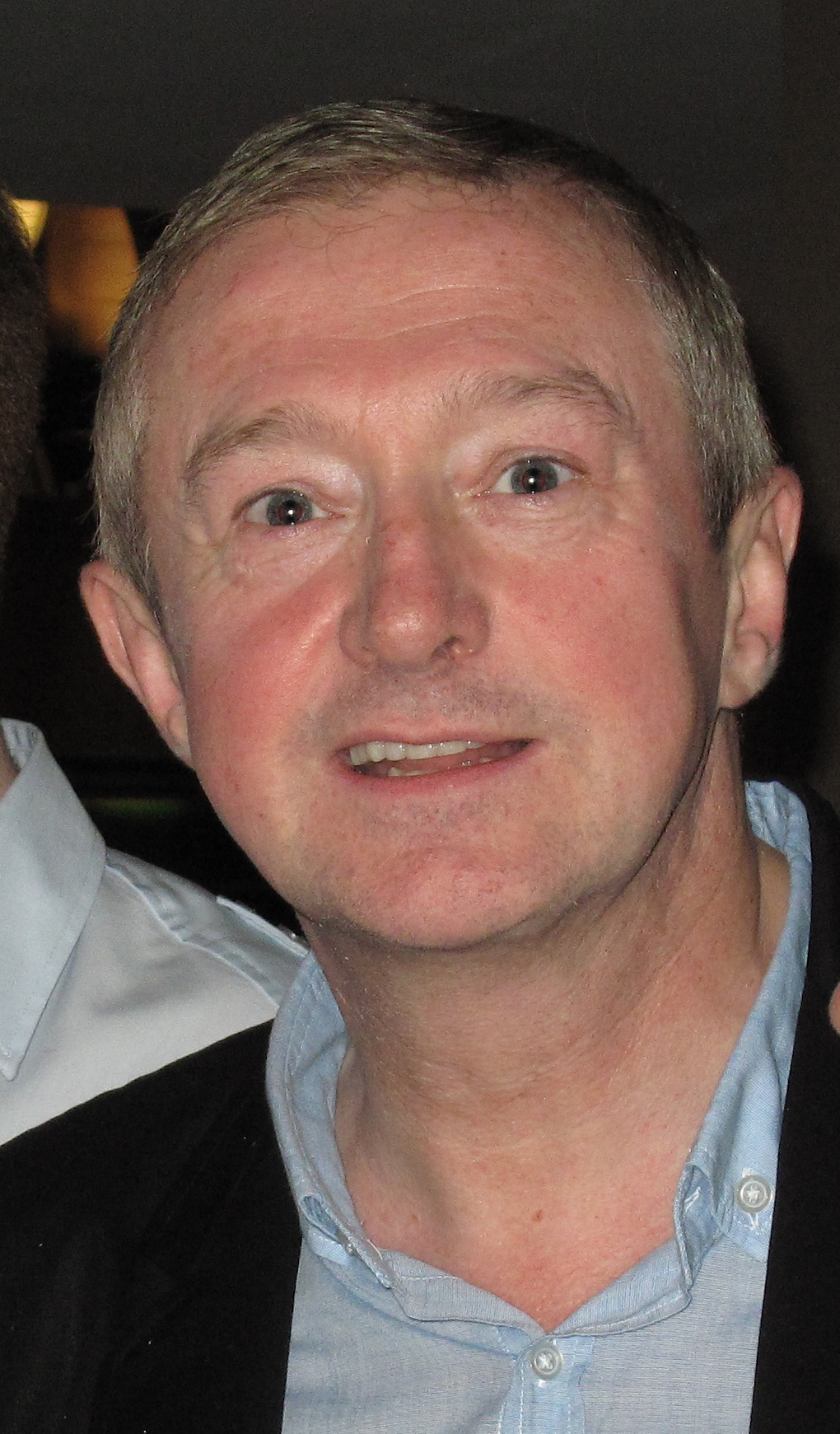
Louis Walsh

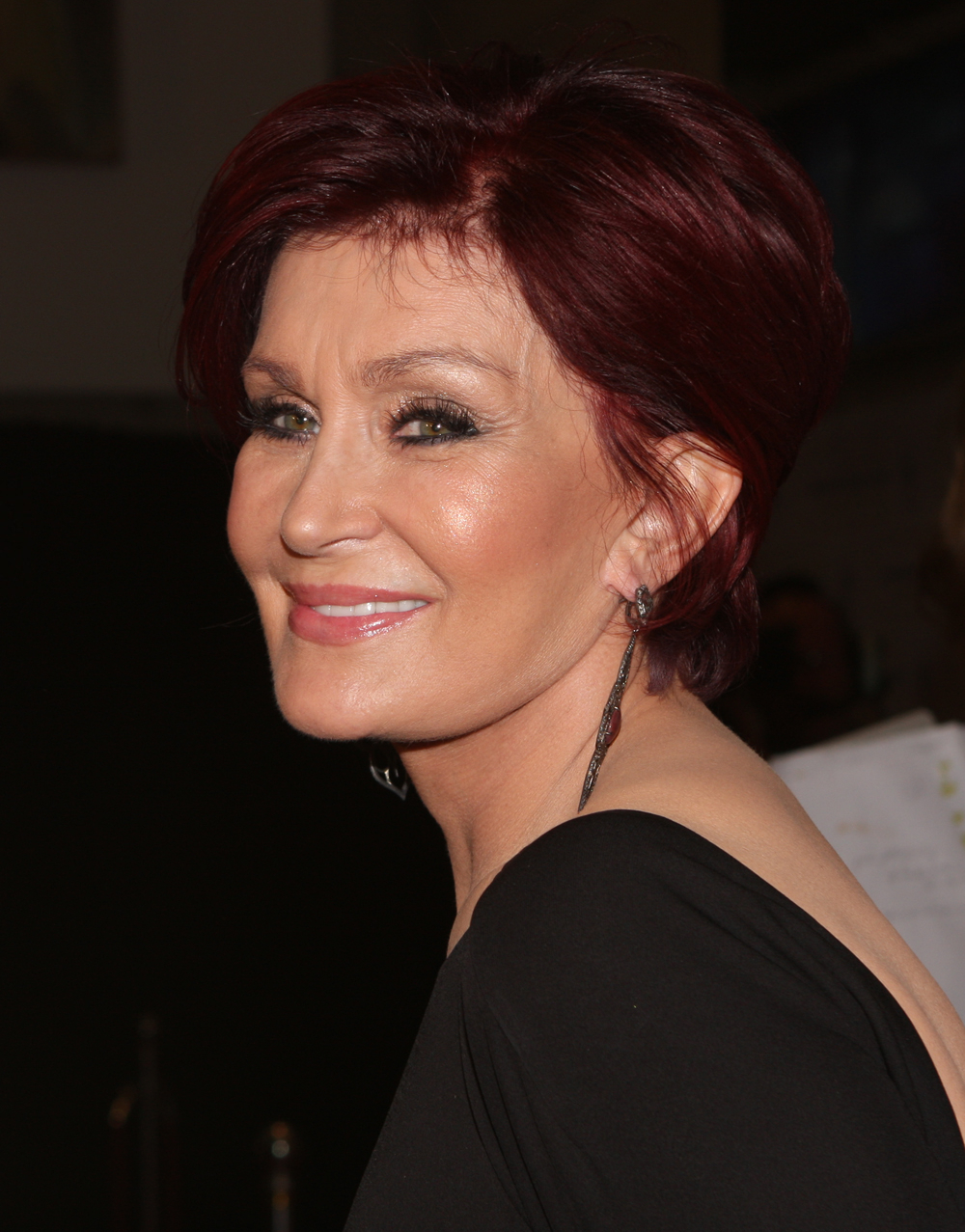
Sharon Osbourne

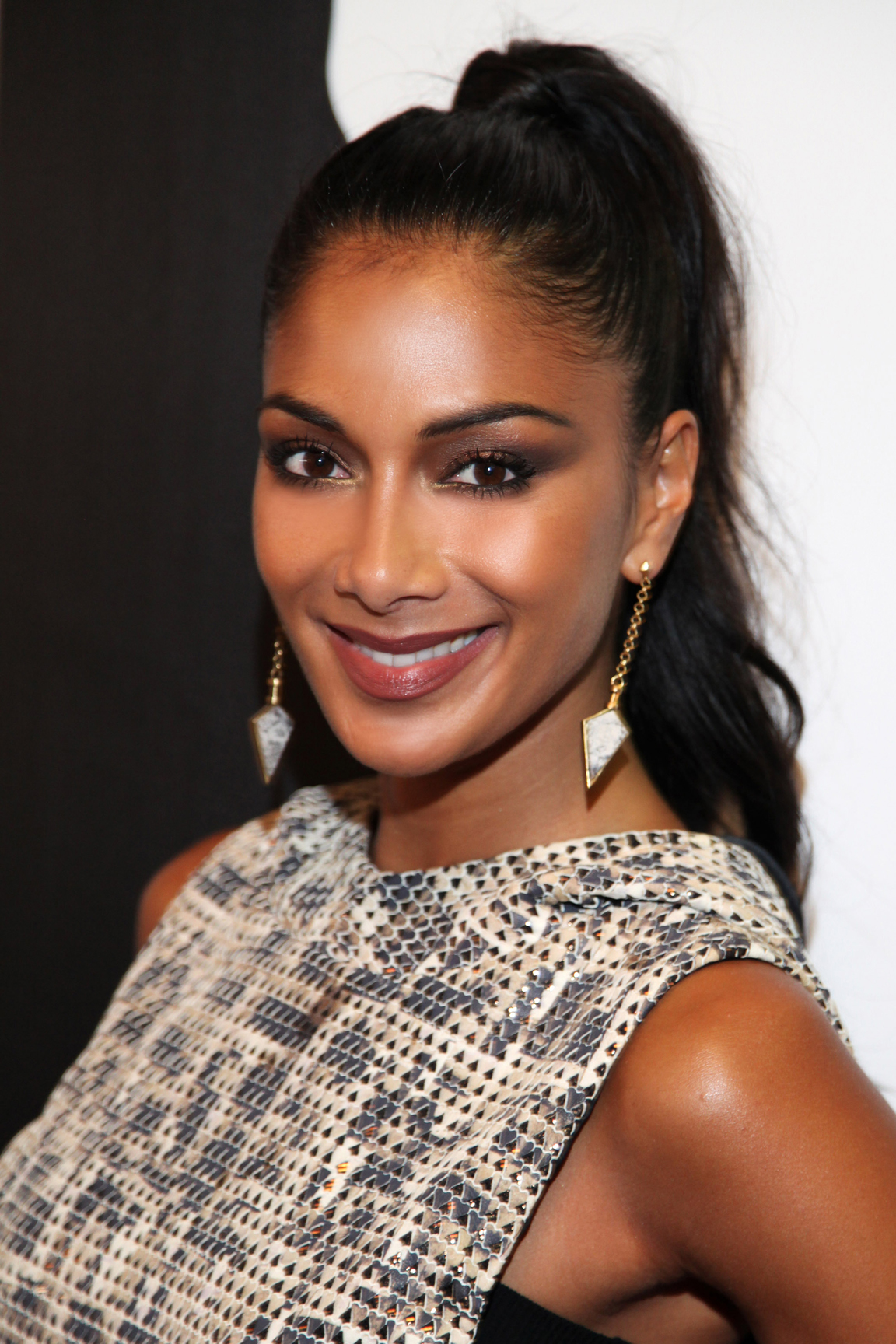
Nicole Scherzinger

Simon Cowell

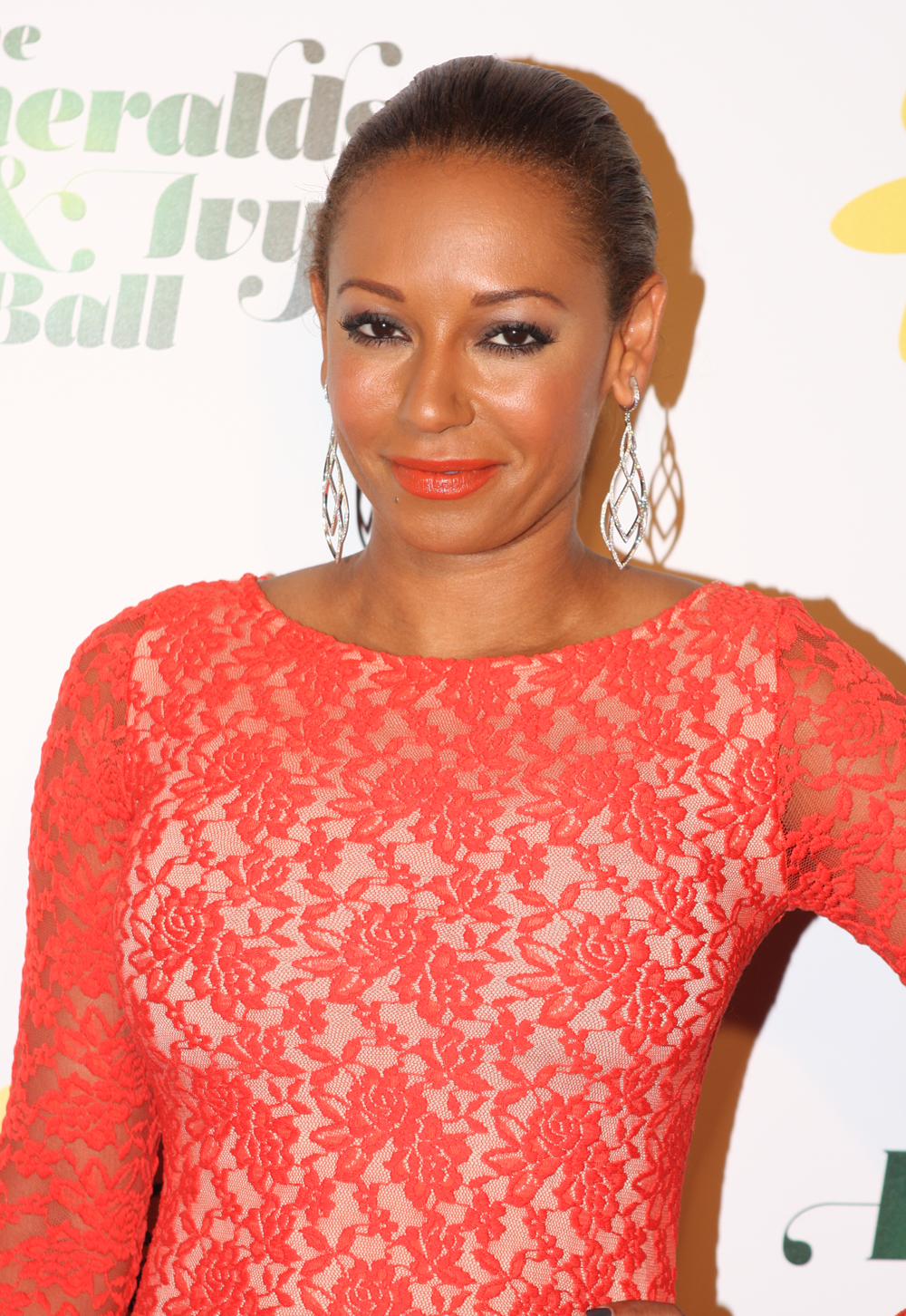
Mel B (Guest)

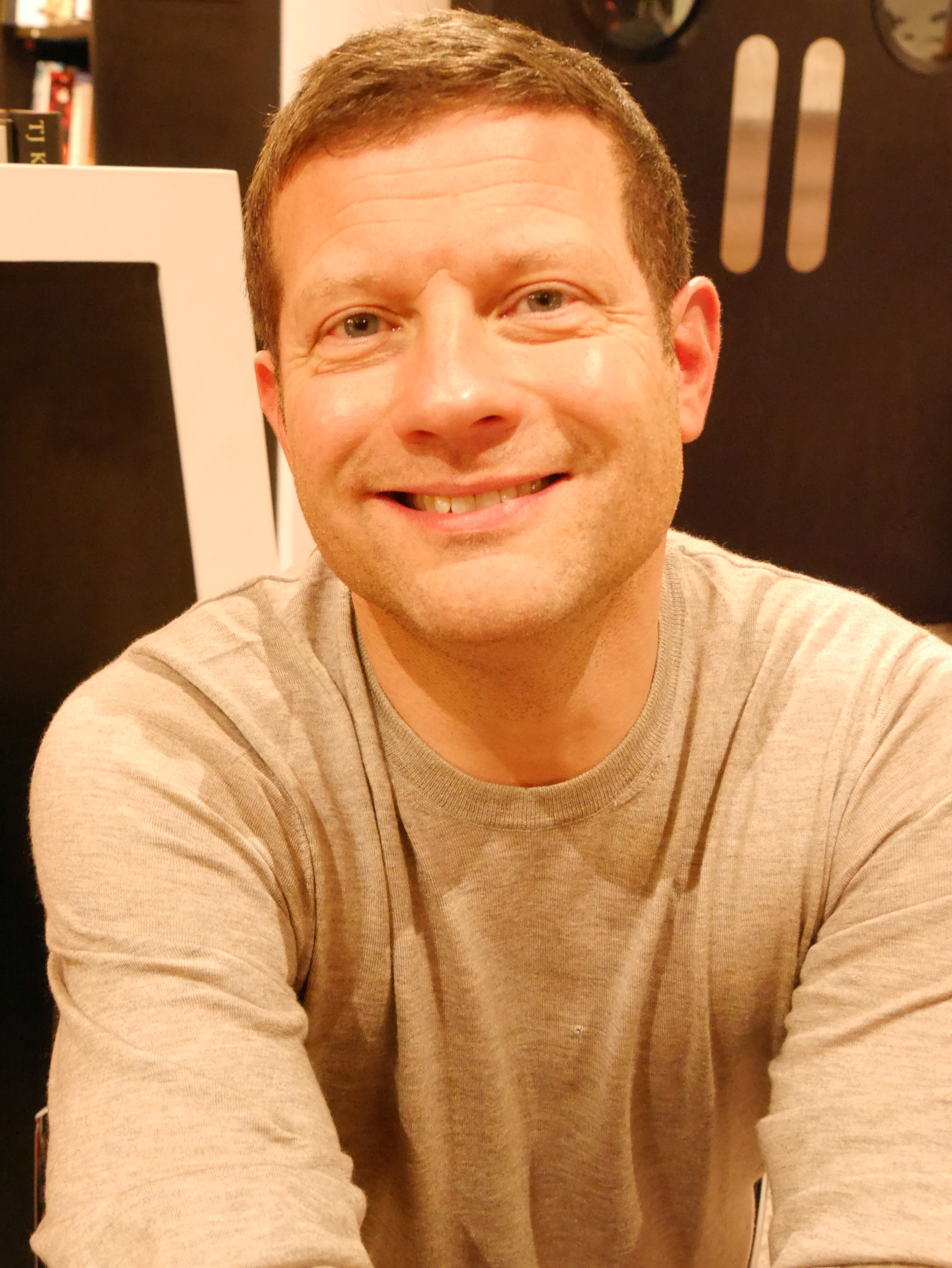
Dermot O'Leary (ITV1)

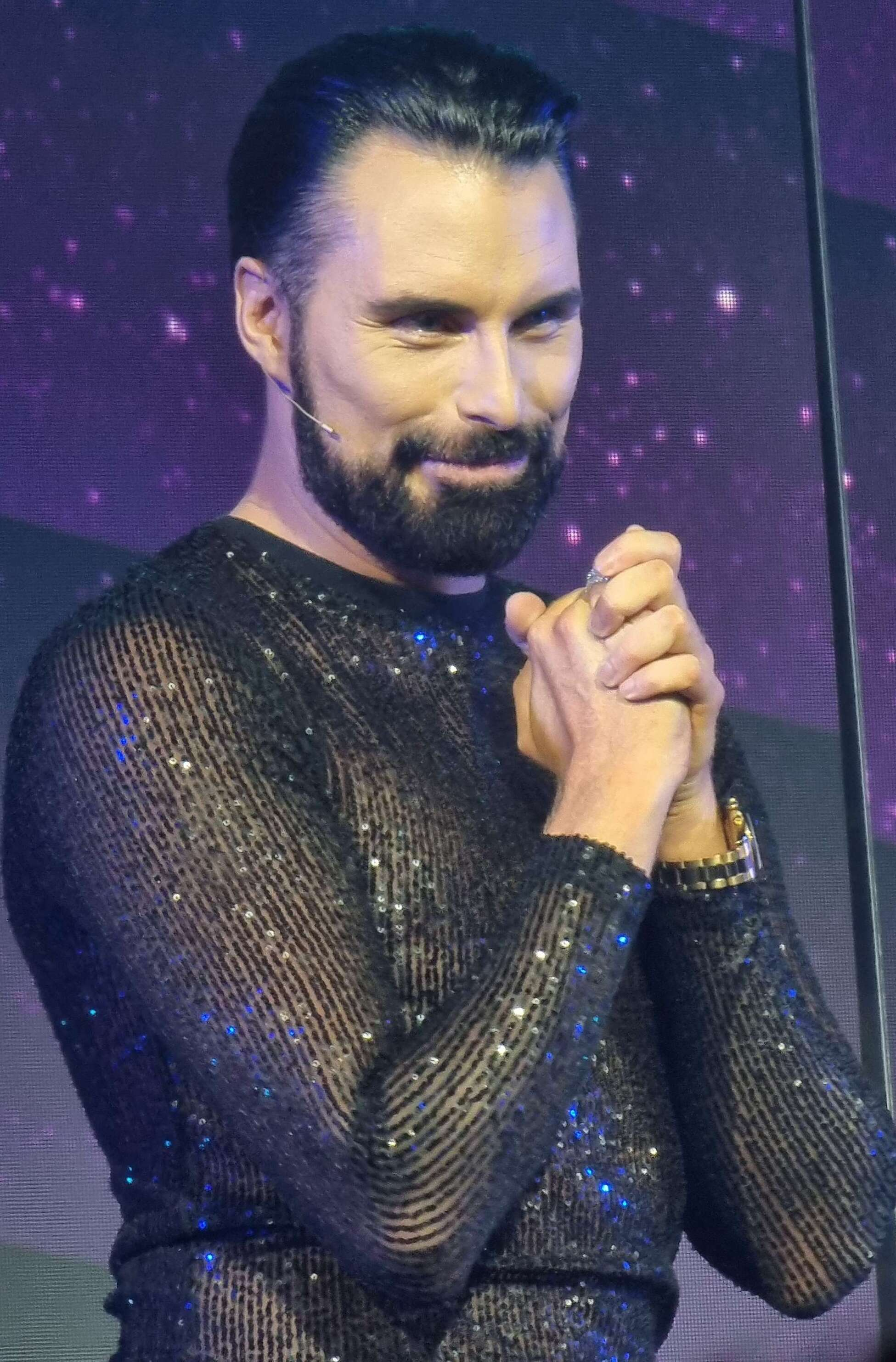
Rylan Clark (ITV2)

On 18 February 2016, series 12 judge Nick Grimshaw announced that he would not come back for another series on the judging panel. On 5 April 2016, it was confirmed that Cheryl would not return as a judge. Rita Ora confirmed she was leaving the judging panel on 10 May 2016. On the same day, it was reported that former judges Nicole Scherzinger, Sharon Osbourne and Louis Walsh may return to join Simon Cowell on the judging panel to collectively replace Ora, Cheryl and Grimshaw. Walsh confirmed he had signed a contract on 15 May 2016. The judging line-up was officially confirmed as Cowell, Walsh, Osbourne and Scherzinger on 1 June 2016.

Beginning in November 2015, it was reported Cowell was unhappy with Flack & Murs as hosts, and began the process to replace them with The Voice UK host Emma Willis for upcoming series.On 22 February 2016, during an interview with The Sun, Olly Murs, who had co-hosted the previous series with Caroline Flack, confirmed his decision to quit the series to focus on his music. In a statement, Murs stated, "This was an incredibly hard decision to make and one I didn't take lightly as I've really enjoyed co-hosting The X Factor." Following Murs' decision to exit the series, Flack confirmed she would exit as well, stating, "I have had a brilliant time working on The X Factor over the last few years, and hosting the main show was just fantastic – I made some amazing friends." On 29 March 2016, it was confirmed that Dermot O'Leary would return to present The X Factor on ITV for the ninth time, after having quit the previous year, and said he was "very flattered to be asked back". For series 12, O'Leary was replaced by Murs and Flack, but the viewing numbers fell and O'Leary was asked back. Richard Holloway, boss of Thames, said he was "a much-loved part of The X Factor and one of the best presenters in the business", while Kevin Lygo, ITV's Director of TV, said he was "an important part of the ITV family". On 27 June 2016, it was confirmed that Matt Edmondson will be the new host of The Xtra Factor replacing Rochelle Humes and Melvin Odoom. On 1 July 2016, it was confirmed that Rylan Clark-Neal will co-host alongside Edmondson, and that Capital FM DJ Roman Kemp would be a digital presenter and social media reporter. Mel B joined the panel for one day of London auditions in lieu of Scherzinger. Osbourne was absent in the Edinburgh auditions and was not replaced by a guest judge.

== Selection process ==
=== Auditions ===
The minimum age to audition this year was 16. Contestants needed three or more 'yeses' from the four judges to progress to Bootcamp.

==== Mobile auditions ====
In addition to the producers' auditions, the "Mobile Audition Tour" took place throughout the UK and Ireland. Auditions ran between 7 March and 30 April 2016, and visited Skegness, Sheffield, Aberdeen, Peterborough, Telford, Edinburgh, Cambridge, Sunderland, Nottingham, Middlesbrough, Leicester, Coventry, Ipswich, Scarborough, Chelmsford, Northampton, Southend-on-Sea, Hull, Milton Keynes, Essex, York, Isle of Man, Swindon, Portsmouth, Bognor Regis, Bristol, Blackpool, Preston, Weston-Super-Mare, Brighton, Newquay, Wigan, Truro, Hastings, Exeter, Margate, Yeovil and Maidstone.

==== Open auditions ====
Producers auditions commenced on 7 April in Glasgow and ended on 14 May in Liverpool.

Audition city	Open audition date	Open audition venue
Glasgow	7 April 2016	Hampden Park
Birmingham	9–10 April 2016	St Andrew's
Cardiff	17 April 2016	Holland House
Dublin	24 April 2016	RDS Arena
Newcastle upon Tyne	27 April 2016	St James' Park
London	1 May 2016	ExCeL London
Manchester	7 May 2016	EventCity
Liverpool	14 May 2016	ACC Liverpool

==== Judges' auditions ====
Cities in the United Kingdom where the judges' auditions were held.
Cities in Ireland where the judges' auditions were held.

Originally, the format for auditions was announced to return to that of series 10 and 11, with both room auditions and consequent arena auditions before bootcamp. However, the arena auditions were scrapped at the end of June, towards the end of the filming of the room auditions. The auditions started on 10 June in Leicester and continued in Manchester on 13 June. The next auditions took place on 17 June in London where Mel B was a guest judge in place of Scherzinger, while Scherzinger had other commitments. Contestant Philip Hadlow did not progress to Bootcamp, but judged one audition in Walsh's place. Subsequent auditions were held in London on 19 June, with Scherzinger returning, before moving to Edinburgh on 23 June and Dublin on 1 July. Selected auditions were broadcast over seven episodes, between 27 August and 17 September 2016.

Notable auditionees this series included Rebekah Ryan, who had UK chart success in the 1990s as an independent artist and previously auditioned in series 4, reaching bootcamp, Saara Aalto, who was the runner-up on series 1 of The Voice of Finland, and actor Will Rush.

Summary of judges' auditions
City	Date(s)	Venue	Changes to judging line-up
Leicester	10 June 2016	King Power Stadium	—N/a
Manchester	13–14 June 2016	Old Trafford Cricket Ground	—N/a
London	17 June 2016	ExCeL London	Mel B (in lieu of Nicole Scherzinger)
London	18–19 June 2016	ExCeL London	—N/a
Edinburgh	23 June 2016	Assembly Rooms	Sharon Osbourne absent
Dublin	1 July 2016	Croke Park	—N/a
London	6 July 2016	Alexandra Palace	—N/a

=== Bootcamp ===
Bootcamp took place at Alexandra Palace from 6 to 8 July 2016. It was broadcast in a single episode on 18 September 2016. The contestants all chose a song from a wall with sheets of paper attached. Each song appeared three times and the three acts who picked the same song would perform that song as a group. Immediately after each performance, the judges would either put the acts through or eliminate them immediately. 121 acts were successful in this part, and the judges then deliberated to cut the number of contestants down further, to decide who would reach the six-chair challenge. At the end of Bootcamp, the judges discovered which categories they would mentor: Scherzinger was given the Boys, Cowell was given the Girls, Osbourne was given the Over 25s and Walsh was given the Groups.

=== Six-chair challenge ===
The six-chair challenge took place from 9 to 12 July, at The SSE Arena, Wembley. It was broadcast over two episodes on 24 and 25 September. Scherzinger and Cowell chose their top six acts during Saturday's show, while Osbourne and Walsh picked their acts during Sunday's show.

=== Judges' houses ===
Filming for judges' houses took place in late August and early/mid September. The locations and guest judges were officially confirmed on 21 September 2016. Walsh was assisted in Ibiza by Fleur East and Alesha Dixon, Cowell went to Malibu with Mel B and Emma Bunton, Osbourne went to her Los Angeles home where she was joined by Robbie Williams, and Scherzinger went to Nice with Calvin Harris. Ivy Grace Paredes, who was originally selected as one of Osbourne's over-25s at the six-chair challenge, withdrew from the competition because her visa would not be issued in time, and she was replaced by Honey G. Four more acts were chosen as wildcards to go to judges' houses. Walsh chose Samantha Lavery for Cowell, Cowell chose Ryan Lawrie for Scherzinger, Scherzinger chose Saara Aalto for Osbourne and Osbourne chose Yes Lad for Walsh.

The judges houses episodes were broadcast on 1 and 2 October 2016.

Judges Houses Performances

Boys:

- Matt: "She's Out of My Life"
- James H: "Ain't No Mountain High Enough"
- Freddy: "Love Me Like You Do"
- Niall: "2 Become 1"
- Ryan: "You Make My Dreams"
- Christian: "How to Save a Life"
- Nate: "Summertime"

Girls:

- Emily: "Ex's and Oh's"
- Samantha L: "Make It Rain"
- Gifty: "This Girl"
- Kayleigh: "Who You Are"
- Caitlyn: "Praying for Time"
- Soheila: "Genie in a Bottle"
- Olivia: "Sometimes"

Groups:

- 5AM: "She's Got That Vibe"
- Tom & Laura: "Up Where We Belong"
- Bradley & Ottavio: "Candyman"
- Yes Lad: "Don't Stop 'Til You Get Enough"
- Four of Diamonds: "Royals" (wildcard)
- The Brooks: "Just a Dream"
- Skarl3t: "Hey Ya!"

Over 25s

- Saara: "The Winner Takes It All"
- Honey G: "Gangsta's Paradise"
- Relley C: "Up to the Mountain"
- Peyton: "Movin' On Up"
- Samantha A: "Tears"
- James W: "Make You Feel My Love"
- Janet: "Ordinary World"

Summary of judges' houses
Judge	Category	Location	Assistants	Acts Eliminated
Simon Cowell	Girls	Malibu	Mel B and Emma Bunton	Soheila Clifford, Olivia Garcia, Kayleigh Marie Morgan, Caitlyn Vanbeck
Sharon Osbourne	Over 25s	Los Angeles	Robbie Williams	Samantha Atkinson, Janet Grogan, Christopher Peyton, James Wilson
Nicole Scherzinger	Boys	Southern France	Calvin Harris	Christian Burrows, James Hughes, Niall Sexton, Nate Simpson
Louis Walsh	Groups	Ibiza	Fleur East and Alesha Dixon	Skarl3t, Tom and Laura, Yes Lad

== Acts ==
Key:

– Winner
– Runner-Up
– Withdrew

Act	Age(s)	Hometown	Category (mentor)	Result
Matt Terry	23	Kent	Boys (Scherzinger)	Winner
Saara Aalto	29	Oulunsalo, Finland	Over 25s (Osbourne)	Runner-Up
5 After Midnight	20–23	East London	Groups (Walsh)	3rd Place
Emily Middlemas	18	Glasgow	Girls (Cowell)	4th Place
Honey G	35	Harrow	Over 25s (Osbourne)	5th Place
Ryan Lawrie	20	Coatbridge	Boys (Scherzinger)	6th Place
Sam Lavery	17	County Durham	Girls (Cowell)	7th Place
Four of Diamonds	17–22	Southampton	Groups (Walsh)	8th Place
Gifty Louise	20	Ghana / London	Girls (Cowell)	9th Place
Relley C	27	Birmingham	Over 25s (Osbourne)	10th Place
Freddy Parker	18	Ashford	Boys (Scherzinger)	11th Place
Brooks Way	17	Cardiff	Groups (Walsh)	12th Place
Bratavio	23 & 25	Leamington Spa & Southampton	Groups (Walsh)	13th Place

== Live shows ==
The live shows began on 8 October 2016, with the performance shows taking place on Saturday night and the results show airing on Sunday night. On 1 October, it was revealed that all the groups would undergo name changes. The new names were revealed as Bratavio (Bradley & Ottavio), Brooks Way (The Brooks) and 5 After Midnight (5AM). The live shows were all filmed at Fountain Studios in London, apart from the live final and final results show, which were filmed at Wembley Arena. This was the last series to be filmed at Fountain Studios, and the semi-final results show and the following episode of The Xtra Factor were the last programmes to be recorded in the studios before its demolition.

New for this series, the first five results shows revealed the acts in the bottom three of the votes, and there was then a second round of 'flash votes' which lasted approximately four minutes, with voting only available via the official The X Factor mobile app. The act who topped this vote avoided the sing-off. Also new, the theme for each week, excluding week 1, is randomly selected via a "jukebox wheel" at the end of the previous week's show, which is spun by O'Leary (apart from week 6, when it was spun by Ant & Dec, during a live link-up from Australia). Themes include "Disco", "Movies", "Fright Night", "80s", "Divas", "Motown", "Girlband vs Boyband" and "Louis loves"—named after Louis Walsh. During the sixth live show, it was revealed that viewers would have a chance to suggest a theme for the jukebox. During the seventh live results show, the new theme was revealed as "Christmas".

On 10 October 2016, Brooks Way confirmed that they would not be taking part in the show after being absent from the first live show. In a statement released by the official website to confirm their exit, Josh Brooks said, "Due to events in my personal life I've decided that it's best not to be on the show at this time. While not everything that has been claimed is true I would like to apologise to everyone involved." A spokesperson for the show added, "Following the allegations relating to Josh Brooks, we have decided by mutual consent that Brooks Way should leave the competition." The same day, it was confirmed that Four of Diamonds, who previously made Judges' Houses, would be replacing Brooks Way. Speaking of their second chance in the competition, the girls said that they "are so excited to be back" and "looking forward to performing live, working hard and showing everyone what they are made of". Speaking about why he brought the girl group back, groups mentor Walsh stated that he was "impressed with the girls" but only had "three spots in the live shows". At the time of the episode airing, many viewers were disappointed that they were not chosen and he stated that he'd "listened to the fans" and was "delighted to be bringing the girls back."

=== Musical guests ===
Each results show features guest performances, with some guests performing during the main performance show. Performers included 2012 The X Factor winner James Arthur on the first results show, the cast of Motown: The Musical on the second live show, OneRepublic and 2011 winners Little Mix on the second results show, Busted, Shawn Mendes and John Legend on the third live results show, 2015 winner Louisa Johnson and Bruno Mars on the fourth live results show, Emeli Sandé and Robbie Williams on the fifth live results show, Sister Sledge on the sixth live show, 2009 runner up Olly Murs and Nathan Sykes on the sixth live results show, the cast of School of Rock, Craig David and Alicia Keys on the seventh live results show, and Busted Clean Bandit featuring Sean Paul and Anne-Marie on the eighth live results show, Zara Larsson and Lady Gaga on the semi-final live results show, The Weeknd, Louis Tomlinson featuring Steve Aoki and Honey G in the first final performances show, and Kylie Minogue, Madness and Little Mix featuring Charlie Puth in the final results show.

=== Results summary ===
Colour key

Act in Boys

Act in Girls

Act in Over 25s

Act in Groups

–	Act was in the bottom two/three and had to perform again in the sing-off
–	Act was in the bottom three but was saved by voters in the lifeline vote and did not have to perform in the sing-off
–	Act received the fewest public votes and was immediately eliminated (no survival)
–	Act received the most public votes
–	Act was ejected from performing but remained in the competition

Weekly results per act
Act		Week 1	Week 2	Week 3	Week 4	Week 5	Week 6	Week 7	Quarter-Final	Semi-Final	Final	
Act		Week 1	Week 2	Week 3	Week 4	Week 5	Week 6	Week 7	Quarter-Final	Semi-Final	Saturday Vote	Sunday Vote
	Matt Terry	1st 22.2%	1st 19.5%	1st 17.8%	2nd 18.7%	1st 16.7%	3rd 16.7%	1st 21.1%	3rd 21.2%	3rd 22.5%	2nd 33.4%	Winner; 48.5%^{3}
	Saara Aalto	9th 5.3%	9th 6.4%	2nd 13.7%	3rd 11.3%	6th 9.4%	2nd 18.4%	2nd 20.1%	1st 23.7%	1st 28.8%	1st 35.3%	Runner-up; 40.4%^{3}
	5 After Midnight	2nd 13.3%	2nd 15.6%	4th 11.5%	4th 10.6%	2nd 15.5%	1st 19.0%	3rd 17.5%	4th 20.3%	2nd 26.6%	3rd 31.3%	Eliminated (final)
	Emily Middlemas	3rd 11.9%	3rd 11.0%	3rd 11.9%	1st 18.7%	3rd 15.3%	4th 13.4%	4th 16.8%	2nd 22.6%	4th 22.1%	Eliminated (semi-final)	
	Honey G	4th 10.9%	4th 9.3%	5th 9.4%	6th 9.2%	5th 11.6%	5th 11.7%	6th 11.2%	5th 12.2%	Eliminated (quarter-final)		
	Ryan Lawrie	8th 6.2%	10th 4.6%	8th 7.4%	7th 8.7%	4th 14.1%	6th 11.1%	5th 13.3%	Eliminated (week 7)			
	Sam Lavery	5th 9.8%	5th 8.8%	6th 8.1%	5th 10.1%	8th 8.5%	7th 9.7%	Eliminated (week 6)				
	Four of Diamonds	Eliminated (judges’ houses)^{2}	6th 7.3%	10th 6.1%	9th 6.1%	7th 8.9%	Eliminated (week 5)					
	Gifty Louise	7th 6.6%	8th 6.4%	7th 7.9%	8th 6.6%	Eliminated (week 4)						
	Relley C	6th 7.8%	7th 6.6%	9th 6.2%	Eliminated (week 3)							
	Freddy Parker	10th 3.4%	11th 4.5%	Eliminated (week 2)								
	Brooks Way	Ejected	Withdrew (week 2)									
	Bratavio	11th 2.6%	Eliminated (week 1)									
Lifeline Vote	1st	Parker; 52.0%	Lawrie; 37.9%	Lawrie; 37.9%	Lawrie; 41.2%	Lavery; 46.1%	No Lifeline Vote					
Lifeline Vote	2nd	Aalto; 38.5%	Aalto; 32.0%	Relley C 36.0%	Louise; 35.0%	Four of Diamonds; 27.3%	No Lifeline Vote					
Lifeline Vote	3rd	Bratavio; 9.5%	Parker; 30.0%	Four of Diamonds; 26.1%	Four of Diamonds; 23.8%	Aalto; 26.6%	No Lifeline Vote					
Sing-off		Aalto, Bratavio	Aalto, Parker	Four of Diamonds, Relley C	Four of Diamonds, Louise	Aalto, Four of Diamonds	Lavery, Lawrie	Honey G, Lawrie	5 After Midnight, Honey G	Middlemas, Terry	No sing-off or judges' votes: results were based on public votes alone	
Judges voted to		Eliminate								Send Through	No sing-off or judges' votes: results were based on public votes alone	
Walsh's vote (Groups)		Aalto	Parker	Relley C	Louise	Aalto	Lawrie	Lawrie	Honey G	Terry	No sing-off or judges' votes: results were based on public votes alone	
Osbourne's vote (Over 25s)		Bratavio	Parker	Four of Diamonds	Louise	Four of Diamonds	Lavery	Lawrie	5 After Midnight	Terry	No sing-off or judges' votes: results were based on public votes alone	
Scherzinger's vote (Boys)		Bratavio	Aalto	Relley C	Louise	Four of Diamonds	Lavery	Honey G	Honey G	Terry	No sing-off or judges' votes: results were based on public votes alone	
Cowell's vote (Girls)		Bratavio	Aalto	Relley C	Four of Diamonds	Four of Diamonds	Lawrie	Lawrie	Honey G	Middlemas	No sing-off or judges' votes: results were based on public votes alone	
Eliminated		Bratavio; 3 of 4 votes Majority	Freddy Parker; 2 of 4 votes Deadlock	Relley C 3 of 4 votes Majority	Gifty Louise; 3 of 4 votes Majority	Four of Diamonds; 3 of 4 votes Majority	Sam Lavery; 2 of 4 votes Deadlock	Ryan Lawrie; 3 of 4 votes Majority	Honey G 3 of 4 votes Majority	Emily Middlemas; 1 of 4 votes Minority	5 After Midnight; 31.3% to save	Saara Aalto; 40.4% to win
Reference(s)												

- ^1 Brooks Way were ejected from performing in week 1 and withdrew before week 2.
- ^2 Four of Diamonds were originally eliminated at the Judges Houses stage but returned for the live shows after week 1 to replace Brooks Way who withdrew.
- ^3 The voting percentages in the Final for the Sunday Vote do not add up to 100%, owing to the freezing of votes. 5 After Midnight received 11.1% of the final vote.

=== Live show details ===
==== Week 1 (8/9 October) ====
- Theme: "Express yourself" (songs to showcase who they are)
- Group performance: "Sax"
- Musical guest: James Arthur ("Say You Won't Let Go")

It was announced at the beginning of Saturday's live show that Brooks Way would not be performing. A spokesperson for the show said: "Due to circumstances that have arisen, Brooks Way will not be appearing on tonight's show."

Acts' performances on the first live show
Act	Category (mentor)	Order	Song	Result
5 After Midnight	Groups (Walsh)	1	"Can't Stop the Feeling!"	Safe
Sam Lavery	Girls (Cowell)	2	"Impossible"	Safe
Saara Aalto	Over 25s (Osbourne)	3	"Let It Go"	Bottom Three
Ryan Lawrie	Boys (Scherzinger)	4	"Perfect"	Safe
Gifty Louise	Girls (Cowell)	5	"That's My Girl"	Safe
Relley C	Over 25s (Osbourne)	6	"Shackles (Praise You)"	Safe
Matt Terry	Boys (Scherzinger)	7	"You Don't Own Me"	Safe (Highest Votes)
Freddy Parker	Boys (Scherzinger)	8	"Killing Me Softly"	Bottom Three; Saved By Lifeline Vote
Bratavio	Groups (Walsh)	9	"Boom, Boom, Boom, Boom!!"/"Barbie Girl"	Bottom Three
Emily Middlemas	Girls (Cowell)	10	"Closer"	Safe
Honey G	Over 25s (Osbourne)	11	"California Love"	Safe
Brooks Way	Groups (Walsh)	Did not perform^{1}	"Cake by the Ocean"	Ejected
Sing-off details
Saara Aalto	Over 25s (Osbourne)	1	"Alive"	Saved
Bratavio	Groups (Walsh)	2	"The Only Way Is Up"	Eliminated

^1 Brooks Way were ejected from performing on the first week of the live shows, and withdrew the day after the first results show. Brooks Way were then later replaced by Four of Diamonds.

Judges' votes to eliminate

- Walsh: Saara Aalto – backed his own act, Bratavio.
- Osbourne: Bratavio – effectively backed her own act, Saara Aalto.
- Scherzinger: Bratavio – based on the sing-off performances.
- Cowell: Bratavio – based on the sing-off performances.

==== Week 2 (15/16 October) ====
- Theme: "Motown"
- Musical guests:
  - Saturday: Cast of Motown: The Musical ("Dancing in the Street")
  - Sunday: OneRepublic ("Kids") and Little Mix ("Shout Out to My Ex")
- Best bits song: "Let Her Go"

On 10 October 2016, Brooks Way confirmed that they would no longer be taking part in the show after being absent from the first live show. It was later confirmed that Four of Diamonds, who were eliminated at Judges' Houses, would replace them.

Acts' performances on the second live show
Act	Category (mentor)	Order	Song	Motown Artist	Result
Freddy Parker	Boys (Scherzinger)	1	"Ain't No Mountain High Enough"	Marvin Gaye & Tammi Terrell	Bottom Three
Emily Middlemas	Girls (Cowell)	2	"Stop! In the Name of Love"	The Supremes	Safe
Matt Terry	Boys (Scherzinger)	3	"I Heard It Through the Grapevine"	Marvin Gaye	Safe (Highest Votes)
Relley C	Over 25s (Osbourne)	4	"Ain't No Sunshine"	Bill Withers	Safe
Sam Lavery	Girls (Cowell)	5	"Hello"	Lionel Richie	Safe
5 After Midnight	Groups (Walsh)	6	"Get Ready"/"Reach Out I'll Be There"	The Temptations	Safe
Ryan Lawrie	Boys (Scherzinger)	7	"Superstition"	Stevie Wonder	Bottom Three; Saved By Lifeline Vote
Honey G	Over 25s (Osbourne)	8	"Mo Money Mo Problems"	The Notorious B.I.G.	Safe
Gifty Louise	Girls (Cowell)	9	"Rockin' Robin"	Jackson 5	Safe
Saara Aalto	Over 25s (Osbourne)	10	"River Deep – Mountain High"	Tina Turner	Bottom Three
Four of Diamonds	Groups (Walsh)	11	"You Keep Me Hangin' On"	The Supremes	Safe
Sing-off details
Freddy Parker	Boys (Scherzinger)	1	"Stay"		Eliminated
Saara Aalto	Over 25s (Osbourne)	2	"Run"		Saved

Judges' votes to eliminate

- Scherzinger: Saara Aalto – gave no reason but effectively backed her own act, Freddy Parker.
- Osbourne: Freddy Parker – backed her own act, Saara Aalto.
- Walsh: Freddy Parker – gave no reason.
- Cowell: Saara Aalto – said the decision was harder than last week and chose to go with his gut.

With the acts in the sing-off receiving two votes each, the result went to deadlock and reverted to the earlier public vote. Freddy Parker was eliminated as the act with the fewest public votes.

==== Week 3 (22/23 October) ====
- Theme: "Divas"
- Guest mentor: John Legend
- Group performance: "Year 3000" (with Busted)
- Musical guests:
  - Saturday: Nicole Scherzinger ("I'm Every Woman"/"Respect")
  - Sunday: Busted ("Year 3000"; with finalists), Shawn Mendes ("Mercy") and John Legend ("Love Me Now")

Acts' performances on the third live show
Act	Category (mentor)	Order	Song	Diva	Result
Ryan Lawrie	Boys (Scherzinger)	1	"Rolling in the Deep"	Adele	Bottom Three; Saved By Lifeline Vote
Gifty Louise	Girls (Cowell)	2	"Lay Me Down"	Sam Smith	Safe
5 After Midnight	Groups (Walsh)	3	"Valerie"	Amy Winehouse	Safe
Sam Lavery	Girls (Cowell)	4	"Earth Song"	Michael Jackson	Safe
Matt Terry	Boys (Scherzinger)	5	"I'll Be There"	The Jackson 5	Safe (Highest Votes)
Honey G	Over 25s (Osbourne)	6	"Ice Ice Baby"/"Under Pressure"	Queen/David Bowie/Vanilla Ice	Safe
Relley C	Over 25s (Osbourne)	7	"(You Make Me Feel Like) A Natural Woman"	Aretha Franklin	Bottom Three
Emily Middlemas	Girls (Cowell)	8	"How Will I Know"	Whitney Houston	Safe
Four of Diamonds	Groups (Walsh)	9	"Lady Marmalade"/"Bang Bang"	Labelle/Jessie J/Ariana Grande/Nicki Minaj	Bottom Three
Saara Aalto	Over 25s (Osbourne)	10	"It's Oh So Quiet"	Björk	Safe
Sing-off
Relley C	Over 25s (Osbourne)	1	"I Can't Make You Love Me"		Eliminated
Four of Diamonds	Groups (Walsh)	2	"Who Are You"		Saved

Judges' votes to eliminate

- Walsh: Relley C – backed his own act, Four of Diamonds, who he said had more potential.
- Osbourne: Four of Diamonds – gave no reason but effectively backed her own act, Relley C.
- Scherzinger: Relley C – based on the sing-off performances.
- Cowell: Relley C – said that Four of Diamonds had more potential.

However, voting statistics revealed that Relley C received more votes than Four of Diamonds which meant that if Cowell sent the result to deadlock, Relley C would have been saved.

==== Week 4 (29/30 October) ====
- Theme: Fright Night
- Group performance: "Cake by the Ocean"
- Musical guests: Louisa Johnson ("So Good") and Bruno Mars ("24K Magic")

Acts' performances on the fourth live show
Act	Category (mentor)	Order	Song	Result
Gifty Louise	Girls (Cowell)	1	"I'm in Love with a Monster"	Bottom Three
Matt Terry	Boys (Scherzinger)	2	"I Put a Spell on You"	Safe
5 After Midnight	Groups (Walsh)	3	"Thriller"	Safe
Honey G	Over 25s (Osbourne)	4	"Men in Black"	Safe
Ryan Lawrie	Boys (Scherzinger)	5	"Everybody (Backstreet's Back)"	Bottom Three; Saved By Lifeline Vote
Sam Lavery	Girls (Cowell)	6	"Total Eclipse of the Heart"	Safe
Saara Aalto	Over 25s (Osbourne)	7	"Bad Romance"	Safe
Four of Diamonds	Groups (Walsh)	8	"Ghost"	Bottom Three
Emily Middlemas	Girls (Cowell)	9	"Creep"	Safe (Highest Votes)
Sing-off
Gifty Louise	Girls (Cowell)	1	"A Song for You"	Eliminated
Four of Diamonds	Groups (Walsh)	2	"The Voice Within"	Saved

Judges' votes to eliminate

- Cowell: Four of Diamonds – gave no reason but effectively backed his own act, Gifty Louise. However, he did initially say Louise's name in response, before backtracking.
- Walsh: Gifty Louise – backed his own act, Four of Diamonds, who he said had more potential.
- Scherzinger: Gifty Louise – gave no reason.
- Osbourne: Gifty Louise – gave no reason.

However, voting statistics revealed that Louise received more votes than Four of Diamonds which meant that if Osbourne sent the result to deadlock, Louise would have been saved.

==== Week 5 (5/6 November) ====
- Theme: "Girlband vs Boyband"
- Group performance: "Keep on Movin'"
- Musical guests: Emeli Sandé ("Breathing Underwater") and Robbie Williams ("Love My Life")

During the fifth live results show, O'Leary confirmed that the final 8 would be part of The X Factor UK Live Tour 2017.

Acts' performances on the fifth live show
Act	Category (mentor)	Order	Song	Band	Result
Matt Terry	Boys (Scherzinger)	1	"I'm Your Man"	Wham!	Safe (Highest Votes)
Sam Lavery	Girls (Cowell)	2	"I'll Stand by You"	The Pretenders	Bottom Three, Saved By Lifeline Vote
Honey G	Over 25s (Osbourne)	3	"Jump"	Kris Kross	Safe
Ryan Lawrie	Boys (Scherzinger)	4	"Twist and Shout"	The Beatles	Safe
Four of Diamonds	Groups (Walsh)	5	"Hold On"	Wilson Phillips	Bottom Three
Saara Aalto	Over 25s (Osbourne)	6	"Sound of the Underground"	Girls Aloud	Bottom Three
Emily Middlemas	Girls (Cowell)	7	"What Makes You Beautiful"	One Direction	Safe
5 After Midnight	Groups (Walsh)	8	"Say You'll Be There"	Spice Girls	Safe
Sing-off
Four of Diamonds	Groups (Walsh)	1	"When You Believe"		Eliminated
Saara Aalto	Over 25s (Osbourne)	2	"Who You Are"		Saved

Judges' votes to eliminate

- Walsh: Saara Aalto – gave no reason but effectively backed his own act, Four of Diamonds.
- Osbourne: Four of Diamonds – gave no reason but effectively backed her own act, Saara Aalto.
- Scherzinger: Four of Diamonds – based on the sing-off performances.
- Cowell: Four of Diamonds – said he thought Four of Diamonds would be safe based on their first performance but concluded that Aalto was more likely to consistently improve following a bad week.

However, voting statistics revealed that Aalto and Four of Diamonds received more votes than Lavery which meant that if Aalto won the lifeline vote, Lavery would have faced Four of Diamonds in the sing-off and in that scenario, if the result went to deadlock, Lavery would have been eliminated. In addition, if Four of Diamonds won the lifeline vote, Lavery would have faced Aalto in the sing-off and in that scenario, if the result went to deadlock, Lavery would have been eliminated.

==== Week 6 (12/13 November) ====
- Theme: "Disco"
- Group performance: "Rise Up"
- Musical guests:
  - Saturday: Sister Sledge ("We Are Family")
  - Sunday: Nathan Sykes ("Famous") and Olly Murs ("Grow Up")

It was revealed during the sixth live show that the lifeline vote would not return for the remainder of the series.

Acts' performances on the sixth live show
Act	Category (mentor)	Order	Song	Result
Saara Aalto	Over 25s (Osbourne)	1	"No More Tears (Enough Is Enough)"	Safe
Sam Lavery	Girls (Cowell)	2	"I Will Survive"	Bottom Two
Ryan Lawrie	Boys (Scherzinger)	3	"Play That Funky Music"	Bottom Two
5 After Midnight	Groups (Walsh)	4	"Boogie Wonderland"/"September"	Safe (Highest Votes)
Matt Terry	Boys (Scherzinger)	5	"Best of My Love"	Safe
Emily Middlemas	Girls (Cowell)	6	"Wishing on a Star"	Safe
Honey G	Over 25s (Osbourne)	7	"Stayin' Alive"	Safe
Sing-off
Sam Lavery	Girls (Cowell)	1	"No More Drama"	Eliminated
Ryan Lawrie	Boys (Scherzinger)	2	"Stop Crying Your Heart Out"	Saved

Judges' votes to eliminate

- Cowell: Ryan Lawrie – gave no reason, but effectively backed his own act, Sam Lavery.
- Scherzinger: Sam Lavery – gave no reason, but effectively backed her own act, Ryan Lawrie.
- Walsh: Ryan Lawrie – stated that Lavery was who he picked as Cowell's wildcard.
- Osbourne: Sam Lavery – could not decide and sent the result to deadlock; although while deliberating, she appeared as though she was going to vote against Lawrie due to him being in the bottom three three times prior; but she eventually said Lavery's name, indicating she was voting to eliminate Lavery.

With the acts in the sing-off receiving two votes each, the result went to deadlock and reverted to the earlier public vote. Sam Lavery was eliminated as the act with the fewest public votes.

==== Week 7 (19/20 November) ====
- Theme: "Movies" (songs from films)
- Musical guests: Cast of School of Rock ("Teacher's Pet"), Craig David ("Change My Love") and Alicia Keys ("Blended Family (What You Do for Love)")

Acts' performances on the seventh live show
Act	Category (mentor)	Order	Song	Film	Result
Ryan Lawrie	Boys (Scherzinger)	1	"Jailhouse Rock"	Jailhouse Rock	Bottom Two
5 After Midnight	Groups (Walsh)	2	"Try a Little Tenderness"	The Commitments	Safe
Saara Aalto	Over 25s (Osbourne)	3	"My Heart Will Go On"	Titanic	Safe
Matt Terry	Boys (Scherzinger)	4	"Writing's on the Wall"	Spectre	Safe (Highest Votes)
Honey G	Over 25s (Osbourne)	5	"It's Like That"/"Gettin' Jiggy wit It"	Keith Lemon: The Film/The Last Days of Disco	Bottom Two
Emily Middlemas	Girls (Cowell)	6	"It Must Have Been Love"	Pretty Woman	Safe
Sing-off
Ryan Lawrie	Boys (Scherzinger)	1	"Lego House"		Eliminated
Honey G	Over 25s (Osbourne)	2	"Get Ur Freak On"/"Work It"		Saved

Judges' votes to eliminate

- Cowell: Ryan Lawrie – despite Lawrie being his wildcard choice for Scherzinger, he felt that Honey G wanted to stay in the competition more. He did however say that he thought the result should have gone to a deadlock.
- Osbourne: Ryan Lawrie – backed her own act, Honey G.
- Scherzinger: Honey G – backed her own act, Ryan Lawrie.
- Walsh: Ryan Lawrie – gave no reason.

However, voting statistics revealed that Lawrie received more votes than Honey G which meant that if Walsh sent the result to deadlock, Lawrie would have advanced to the quarter-final and Honey G would have been eliminated.

==== Week 8: Quarter-Final (26/27 November) ====
- Theme: "Louis Loves" (songs chosen by Walsh); acts' own choice (no theme)
- Group performance: "Saturday Night's Alright for Fighting"
- Musical guests: Busted ("On What You're On") and Clean Bandit featuring Anne-Marie and Sean Paul ("Rockabye")

For the first time this series, the acts performed two songs.

Acts' performances in the quarter-final
Act	Category (mentor)	Order	First song ("Louis Loves")	Order	Second song (own choice)	Result
Matt Terry	Boys (Scherzinger)	1	"Secret Love Song, Pt II"	6	"Alive"	Safe
Saara Aalto	Over 25s (Osbourne)	2	"The Winner Takes It All"	10	"Diamonds Are Forever"/"Diamonds Are a Girl's Best Friend"	Safe (Highest Votes)
Honey G	Over 25s (Osbourne)	3	"U Can't Touch This"/"Super Freak"	8	"Push It"/"Black Beatles"	Bottom Two
5 After Midnight	Groups (Walsh)	4	"Uptown Funk"	7	"Sorry"/"One Dance"	Bottom Two
Emily Middlemas	Girls (Cowell)	5	"Toxic"	9	"Human"	Safe
Sing-off
Honey G	Over 25s (Osbourne)	1	"California Love"			Eliminated
5 After Midnight	Groups (Walsh)	2	"Beneath Your Beautiful"			Saved

Judges' votes to eliminate

- Walsh: Honey G – backed his own act, 5 After Midnight, saying they were better than Honey G.
- Osbourne: 5 After Midnight – gave no reason but effectively backed her own act, Honey G.
- Scherzinger: Honey G – gave no reason.
- Cowell: Honey G – said that he had to do what the public would expect, and that Honey G had gone as far as she could in the competition; and although he expected 5 After Midnight to be in the sing-off, he believed that they would continue to improve in the competition.

==== Week 9: Semi-Final (3/4 December) ====
- Theme: "Christmas"; "Get Me to the Final"
- Group performance: "Do They Know It's Christmas? (2014)"
- Musical guests: Zara Larsson ("I Would Like"/"Lush Life") and Lady Gaga ("Million Reasons")

Acts' performances in the semi-final
Act	Category (mentor)	Order	Christmas Song	Order	Song To Get into The Final	Result
Matt Terry	Boys (Scherzinger)	1	"Silent Night"	6	"Say You Love Me"	Bottom Two
5 After Midnight	Groups (Walsh)	2	"Stay Another Day"	8	"Signed, Sealed, Delivered I'm Yours"	Safe
Emily Middlemas	Girls (Cowell)	3	"Happy Xmas (War Is Over)"	5	"Mad World"	Bottom Two
Saara Aalto	Over 25s (Osbourne)	4	"White Christmas"/"All I Want for Christmas Is You"	7	"Chandelier"	Safe (Highest Votes)
Sing-off
Matt Terry	Boys (Scherzinger)	1	"Hurt"			Saved
Emily Middlemas	Girls (Cowell)	2	"Wings"			Eliminated

Judges' votes to send through to the final

- Cowell: Emily Middlemas – gave no reason but effectively backed his own act, Emily Middlemas.
- Scherzinger: Matt Terry – gave no reason but effectively backed her own act, Matt Terry.
- Walsh: Matt Terry – gave no reason.
- Osbourne: Matt Terry – gave no reason.

==== Week 10: Final (10/11 December) ====
10 December

- Themes: New song (no theme); celebrity duets
- Group performance: "Final Night"/"Shout Out to My Ex"/"Cake by the Ocean"/"Can't Stop the Feeling!" (all finalists except Brooks Way, and Beck Martin, who reached bootcamp singing his own song, "Friday Night")
- Musical guests: Louis Tomlinson and Steve Aoki ("Just Hold On"), Honey G ("Men in Black"/"Ice Ice Baby"/"Jump"/"The Honey G Show") and The Weeknd ("Can't Feel My Face"/"Starboy")

Acts' performances on the Saturday Final
Act	Category (mentor)	Order	First song	Order	Second song (duet)	Result
5 After Midnight	Groups (Walsh)	1	"Crazy in Love"	4	"Tears" (with Clean Bandit and Louisa Johnson)	Eliminated
Matt Terry	Boys (Scherzinger)	2	"Take Me Home"	5	"Purple Rain" (with Nicole Scherzinger)	Safe
Saara Aalto	Over 25s (Osbourne)	3	"Everybody Wants to Rule the World"	6	"Bohemian Rhapsody" (with Adam Lambert)	Safe (Highest Votes)

5 After Midnight received the fewest public votes and was automatically eliminated.

11 December

- Themes: Song of the series; no theme
- Group performance: "Everybody's Free (To Feel Good)" (Final 2 with Kylie Minogue)
- Musical guests: Kylie Minogue with Final 2 ("Everybody's Free (To Feel Good)"), Madness ("Mr Apples"/"Our House"/"It Must Be Love"), auditionees ("Nothing's Gonna Stop Us Now") and Little Mix featuring Charlie Puth ("Oops"/"Touch")

Acts' performances on the Sunday Final
Act	Category (mentor)	Order	Song of the series	Originally Performed in..	Order	Song to win	Result
Saara Aalto	Over 25s (Osbourne)	1	"It's Oh So Quiet"	Live Show 3	3	"I Didn't Know My Own Strength"	Runner-up
Matt Terry	Boys (Scherzinger)	2	"Writing's on the Wall"	Live Show 7	4	"One Day I'll Fly Away"	Winner

Following the announcement that Terry had won, he performed his winner's single, "When Christmas Comes Around".

== Winner's single ==
On 4 December 2016, it was announced that all VAT from the winner's single would be donated to charity, meaning that the charities Together for Short Lives and Shooting Star Chase would receive 100% of all profits from sales of the single. It is the sixth year running that the Chancellor of the Exchequer has waived VAT on The X Factor's winner's single.

== Reception ==
=== Ratings ===
Episode	Air date	Duration (minutes)^{1}	Official rating (millions inc. HD & +1)^{,2}	Weekly rank^{,3}
Auditions 1	27 August	90	8.52	2
Auditions 2	28 August	60	7.93	4
Auditions 3	3 September	60	10.05	3
Auditions 4	4 September	60	9.07	4
Auditions 5	10 September	60	9.02	2
Auditions 6	11 September	60	8.51	3
Auditions 7	17 September	60	9.21	2
Bootcamp	18 September	90	8.17	3
Six-chair challenge 1	24 September	110	8.73	4
Six-chair challenge 2	25 September	120	8.52	5
Judges' houses 1	1 October	110	8.59	4
Judges' houses 2	2 October	90	7.83	5
Live show 1	8 October	120	7.57	7
Live results 1	9 October	60	7.39	8
Live show 2	15 October	120	7.01	14
Live results 2	16 October	60	7.34	11
Live show 3	22 October	110	7.12	18
Live results 3	23 October	60	7.22	15
Live show 4	29 October	110	7.04	13
Live results 4	30 October	60	6.92	19
Live show 5	5 November	100	6.72	24
Live results 5	6 November	60	7.13	12
Live show 6	12 November	90	7.18	15
Live results 6	13 November	60	6.91	18
Live show 7	19 November	85	7.10	17
Live results 7	20 November	60	6.73	23
Live show 8	26 November	110	6.63	27
Live results 8	27 November	60	6.55	28
Live show 9	3 December	90	6.67	22
Live results 9	4 December	60	6.70	21
Live final	10 December	125	6.35	24
Live final results	11 December	125	7.56	9
Series average	2016	—N/a	7.62	—N/a

^{1} Includes advert breaks
^{2} The ratings over a 7-day period, including the broadcasts on ITV, ITV HD, ITV+1 and streaming through ITV Hub.
^{3} The rank for the combined ITV, ITV HD and ITV+1 broadcasts, compared with all channels for that week, from Monday to Sunday.

=== Controversy and criticism ===
==== Brooks Way's withdrawal ====
Just hours before the first live show, duo Brooks Way, consisting of twin brothers Kyle and Josh Brooks, were suspended from the competition, over allegations that Josh had been violent with his ex-girlfriend Amelia Clark, allegedly breaking her nose and kicking her in the face during a New Year Eve party earlier in the year. It was reported throughout the weekend that Josh was regularly beating up Kyle. Kyle and Amelia came to Josh's defence, saying respectively that the allegations were false and that they were written by a friend and fan who chose to exploit from the show. During the broadcast, presenter Dermot O'Leary acknowledged the brothers' absence stating that it was due to "circumstances that have arisen".

The following Monday, the duo released a statement saying that they were withdrawing from the competition, from "mutual consent" with the producers, whilst denying the "false allegations" and saying that "truth always wins". They were replaced by girl group, Four of Diamonds later that week.

==== Fix claims ====
The X Factor were forced to deny that the competition was fixed when nightclub Kittys & Kandy, in Kirkcaldy, posted on Facebook that Honey G would be performing there on 10 December 2016, the same night as the show's final. The post was deleted and the venue said they had secured the date in case Honey G was eliminated before that date, but a spokesperson for The X Factor said, "This story is not true and there is no foundation to any fix claims. The club was mistaken in their post that she would be there on 10 December and the post has since been removed."

Several viewers suspected that the jukebox wheel was rigged after it selected "Fright Night" for the theme for week 4, two days before Halloween. O'Leary insisted the wheel was not rigged, calling it "the most rudimentary hamster wheel you've ever seen in your life". Scherzinger also said she thought it was not fixed because, "I can't pick my songs until we know what theme we're doing—and the producers aren't picking anything as well." Contestant Middlemas said of the wheel: "It's not computerised, it's an old-fashioned wheel. We can see it at the side and there's no-one else around apart from Dermot [O'Leary] pulling the wheel. We do it at rehearsals and it lands on something different each time. All of the producers knew people would say it was fixed. But we know how it works."

==== Voting ====
At the start of the third live show, O'Leary announced that the voting lines were open for all contestants before they had performed, instead of after they performed as it had been in the first two live shows. Isobel Mohan from The Daily Telegraph claimed this was unfair and gave an advantage to those performing first and turned it into a popularity contest instead of a talent show.

During the fifth results show, many viewers claimed that they were unable to vote via the mobile app. This also led to claims of a fix.

==== Swearing ====
Ofcom received five complaints from viewers after Gifty Louise was heard swearing when she said, "I fucking told you" during the third live results show, when Sam Lavery was announced as the first act through to the following week. Gifty issued an apology after the results. Ofcom confirmed that they were assessing the complaints before deciding whether to investigate. Gifty left the show the following week admitting that her f-bomb had been her most embarrassing moment.
