= 5 After Midnight =

British boy band

- Origin: East London, United Kingdom
- Genres: R&B; pop; hip hop; soul
- Years active: 2016–2018
- Label: Syco
- Members: Jordan Bruce Lee; Nathan Lewis
- Past members: Kieran Alleyne

5 After Midnight, also known as 5AM, were a British boy band formed in 2016 during the thirteenth series of The X Factor, were the last contestant eliminated. Their debut single, "Up in Here" peaked at 51 on the UK Singles Chart.

== Career ==
=== 2016: The X Factor ===
The group took part in the thirteenth series of the UK version of The X Factor. They competed in the "Groups" category mentored by Louis Walsh. In the finals, the group duetted with Louisa Johnson, where they performed hit single Tears. Eventually, they were the last contestant eliminated, being defeated by Matt Terry and Saara Aalto.

The X Factor performances and results 2016
| Episode | Theme | Song | Result |
|---|---|---|---|
| Auditions | —N/a | "One Dance" – Drake feat. Wizkid & Kyla | Through to Bootcamp |
| Bootcamp | —N/a | "Without You" – David Guetta feat. Usher | Through to six-chair challenge |
| Six-chair challenge | —N/a | "How Deep is Your Love" – Calvin Harris | Through to judges' houses |
| Judges' houses | —N/a | "She's Got That Vibe" – R. Kelly feat. Public Announcement | Through to live shows |
| Live show 1 | Express Yourself | "Can't Stop the Feeling!" – Justin Timberlake | Safe (2nd) |
| Live show 2 | Motown | "Get Ready"/ "Reach Out I'll Be There" – The Temptations/ Four Tops | Safe (2nd) |
| Live show 3 | Divas & Legends | "Valerie" – Mark Ronson feat. Amy Winehouse | Safe (4th) |
| Live show 4 | Fright Night | "Thriller" – Michael Jackson | Safe (4th) |
| Live show 5 | Girlband vs Boyband | "Say You'll Be There" – Spice Girls | Safe (2nd) |
| Live show 6 | Disco | "Boogie Wonderland"/"September" – Earth, Wind & Fire & The Emotions/ Earth, Wind & Fire | Safe (1st) |
| Live show 7 | Movies | "Try a Little Tenderness" – Otis Redding | Safe (3rd) |
| Quarter-Final | Louis Loves | "Uptown Funk" – Mark Ronson feat. Bruno Mars | Bottom two (4th) |
| Quarter-Final | Contestant's Choice | "Sorry"/ "One Dance" – Justin Bieber/ Drake feat. Wizkid & Kyla | Bottom two (4th) |
| Quarter-Final | Sing-off | "Beneath Your Beautiful" – Labrinth feat. Emeli Sandé | Safe (majority vote) |
| Semi-Final | Christmas | "Stay Another Day" – East 17 | Safe (2nd) |
| Semi-Final | Contestant's Choice | "Signed, Sealed, Delivered I'm Yours" – Stevie Wonder | Safe (2nd) |
| Final | New song | "Crazy in Love" – Beyoncé feat. Jay Z | Eliminated (third place) |
| Final | Celebrity duet | "Tears" (with Louisa Johnson & Clean Bandit) | Eliminated (third place) |

=== 2017: "Up in Here", The Sauce ===
In 2017, they released their debut single "Up in Here". Subsequently, the trio released their first extended play, The Sauce, featuring a total of 4 tracks.

=== 2018–present: Dropped by Syco, Alleyne's departure ===
With the limited success that the band had, they were dropped by Simon Cowell's record label Syco.

In January 2018, Kieran Alleyne left the group to pursue a solo music career.

== Discography ==
=== Extended plays ===
| Title | Details |
|---|---|
| The Sauce | Released: 25 November 2017; Label: Syco; Formats: Digital download; Track listing: 1. "Taste"; 2. "Talk"; 3. "City Lights"; 4. "Flowers" |

=== Singles ===
==== As lead artist ====
| Title | Year | UK | Album |
|---|---|---|---|
| "Up in Here" | 2017 | 51 | Non-album single |

==== As featured artist ====
| Title | Year | Peak chart positions | | | | Certifications | Album |
| Title | Year | UK | FIN (DL) | IRE | SCO | Certifications | Album |
|---|---|---|---|---|---|---|---|
| "Bridge over Troubled Water" (as part of Artists for Grenfell) | 2017 | 1 | 25 | 25 | 1 | BPI: Silver | Non-album single |

== Tours ==
- The X Factor Live Tour (2017)
