= Best Behaviour =

Best Behaviour may refer to:

- "Best Behaviour" (N-Dubz song), 2010
- "Best Behaviour" (Louisa Johnson song), 2017
- "Best Behaviour" (Doctors), a 2003 television episode
