= Sucker for You =

Single by Matt Terry

from the album Trouble
- Released: 13 October 2017
- Recorded: June 2017
- Length: 3:23
- Label: Syco
- Songwriters: Matt Terry; Anton Hård af Segerstad; Sara Hjellström
- Producer: The Family

Matt Terry singles chronology
"Súbeme la Radio" (2017)	"Sucker for You" (2017)	"Try" (2018)

"Sucker for You" is a song by British singer and songwriter Matt Terry. It was released on 13 October 2017, as the lead single from his debut studio album, Trouble. The song peaked at number 51 on the UK Singles Chart.

== Background ==
On 9 October 2017, Terry announced the song's release date on social media. Describing the song as being about "the darker side of love", he said: "We've all been in that position when we know a relationship is toxic and not good for us, but sometimes we ignore it and refuse to let go. I wrote this song when I was going through exactly that. The lyrics tell a tale of heartbreak, but the melody isn't sad or depressing – because I've come out the other side and I'm happy now." In an interview with Official Charts Company, Terry revealed that he wrote the song in June 2017 with the songwriting and music production team The Family in Sweden. He said of the song: "It's about knowing you love someone more than they love you. Even though they're f**king up and not being a great partner, you're sticking with them and basically being a bit of a loser." They weighed up a total of seven songs for the lead single, and decided that "Sucker for You" will not be the closing track on the album.

== Critical reception ==
Rob Casey of Official Charts Company regarded it as "a proper radio-friendly pop song that wouldn't sound out of place on a Charlie Puth or Nick Jonas record".

== Music video ==
An official music video to accompany the release of "Sucker for You" was first released onto YouTube on 27 October 2017, at a total length of three minutes and forty-eight seconds.

== Track listing ==
Digital download
No.	Title	Length
1.	"Sucker for You"	3:23

Digital download – acoustic
No.	Title	Length
1.	"Sucker for You" (acoustic)	3:26

Digital download – John Gibbons remix
No.	Title	Length
1.	"Sucker for You" (John Gibbons remix)	4:59

== Charts ==
Chart (2017–2018)	Peak position
Czech Republic (Singles Digitál Top 100)	61
Ireland (IRMA)	83
Latvia (DigiTop100)	82
Scotland Singles (OCC)	52
Slovakia (Singles Digitál Top 100)	66
UK Singles (OCC)	51

== Certifications ==
Region	Certification	Certified units/sales
United Kingdom (BPI)	Silver	200,000^{‡}
Streaming
Japan (RIAJ)	Gold	50,000,000^{†}
^{‡} Sales+streaming figures based on certification alone.^{†} Streaming-only figures based on certification alone.

== Release history ==
Region	Date	Format	Version	Label	Ref.
United Kingdom	13 October 2017	Digital download	Original	Syco	
United Kingdom	10 November 2017	Digital download	John Gibbons remix	Syco	
United Kingdom	15 December 2017	Digital download	Acoustic	Syco	
