= When Christmas Comes Around =

When Christmas Comes Around may refer to:

- "When Christmas Comes Around" (song), 2015 Matt Terry song
- When Christmas Comes Around..., 2021 Kelly Clarkson album
  - When Christmas Comes Around... Again, a 2024 reissue album
