= Trouble (Matt Terry album) =

Studio album by Matt Terry
- Released: 24 November 2017
- Genre: Pop
- Length: 42:54
- Label: RCA
- Producer: Steve Robson; Rayito; The Family; Freedo; Josh Wilkinson; Sky Adams; Red Triangle; RedOne; T. I. Jakke; Duck Blackwell; Pablo Fierro; Ronny Svendsen; The Beast; Future Cut

Singles from Trouble
- 1. "Sucker for You" Released: 13 October 2017; 2. "Try" Released: 10 February 2018

Trouble is the debut and only studio album by British singer Matt Terry. It was released on 24 November 2017 and it debuted at No. 29 on the charts. This is the first time that an X Factor UK winner has released their first album with another label instead of with Cowell's label, Syco.

== Background ==
On 11 December 2016, he was crowned as the winner of The X Factor 2016, beating Saara Aalto. He immediately released his winner's single, "When Christmas Comes Around", an original song written by Ed Sheeran, which was not included on Trouble. Following his win, Terry signed with RCA Records.

== Singles ==
"Sucker for You" was released as the album's lead single on 13 October 2017. "The Thing About Love" was released as the first promotional single from the album on 17 November 2017. In February 2018 a music video for "Try" was released.

=== Other songs ===
Terry also features on the remix of Enrique Iglesias' song "Súbeme la Radio" alongside Sean Paul. The song is included on the album.

== Track listing ==
Trouble
No.	Title	Writer(s)	Producer(s)	Length
1.	"Sucker for You"	Matt Terry; Anton Hård af Segerstad; Sara Hjellström	The Family	3:23
2.	"Got You"	Terry; Steve Robson; Ed Drewett	Robson; Freedo	2:43
3.	"Trouble"	Terry; Josh Wilkinson; Rachel Furner	Wilkinson	3:01
4.	"The Thing About Love"	Terry; Robson; Iain Farquharson; Andrew Bullimore	Robson	3:16
5.	"Try"	Terry; Sky Adams; Danny Shah; Tom Aspaul	Adams	3:14
6.	"Re-Writing History"	Terry; Samuel Preston; George Tizzard; Rick Parkhouse	Red Triangle	3:18
7.	"Original" (with RedOne)	Nadir Khayat; Sean Douglas; T. I. Jakke; Daniel Bedingfield	RedOne; Jakke	3:18
8.	"Don't Ask"	Terry; Duck Blackwell; Andrew Jackson; Jacob Manson	Blackwell	3:45
9.	"Mama" (featuring Ana Mena)	Terry; Antonio Rayo; Rafa Vergara; Pablo Fierro; Alberto Martinez-Liop	Rayito; Fierro	3:22
10.	"Weigh Me Down"	Terry; Anne Judith Wik; Nermin Harambasic; Ronny Svendsen; Justin Stein	Ronny Svendsen	3:42
11.	"Not You"	Terry; Björn Djupström; Tobias Frelin	The Beast	3:11
12.	"Romeo y Juliet"	Terry; Rayo; Vergara; Leroy Sanchez; Martinez-Liop	Rayito	4:33
13.	"Heartless"	Terry; Darren Lewis; Iyiola Babalola; Preston	Future Cut	3:04
14.	"Súbeme la Radio" (Remix) (Enrique Iglesias featuring Sean Paul and Matt Terry)	Enrique Iglesias; Felix Ortiz; Gabriel Pizarro; Descemer Bueno	Luis Ortiz; Gaby Music; Chris Jeday; Carlos Paucar	3:27

== Charts ==
Chart (2017)	Peak position
Scottish Albums (OCC)	39
UK Albums (OCC)	29

== Certifications ==
Region	Certification	Certified units/sales
Poland (ZPAV)	Gold	10,000^{‡}
^{‡} Sales+streaming figures based on certification alone.
