= Rebekah Ryan =

- Born: 21 June 1976 (age 50)
- Occupations: Singer; songwriter
- Years active: 1996–present
- Musical career
- Genres: R&B; Pop; soul
- Labels: MCA Records; Independent

Rebecca Jane Ryan (born 21 June 1976), also known as Rebekah Ryan, is an English female pop singer and songwriter from Tamworth.

== Career ==
In 1996, she signed to MCA Records, her debut single, "You Lift Me Up" was released and was well reviewed, and a big national club hit in the UK. The single also reached the Top 40 in the UK Singles Chart.

The follow-up, "Just A Little Bit of Love" was not so well received by critics. Of note, Smash Hits, reviewing the single, declared that "Rebekah may be as cute as a box of Andrex puppies, but even that shouldn't help this duffer of a dance single into the charts". Nevertheless, it was a sizeable club success, and like its predecessor, was produced by the popular dance outfit, K-Klass. However, the single failed to reach the Top 40, peaking at number 51 in the UK. Celine Dion also sang the song. Rebekah performed this song on her support act slot, with Boyzone, on their concurrent tour.

Early in 1997, "Woman in Love" was released to mixed reviews. It was a cover version of the Barbra Streisand hit. "Woman in Love" was essentially a ballad with hip hop and R&B undertones. The track did not sell well, entering the charts at number 64 and disappearing from the chart the following week. Ryan did have an album in the pipeline and said to be forthcoming in the media around the time of this single's release. It was due for release in mid-1997 However, it was decided not to release it, due to Ryan's previous two singles failing to emulate the success of her debut. It is known that (as well as the three singles), the following tracks were recorded for this album: "Fallen" (produced by Steve Anderson of Brothers in Rhythm (who has actually seemingly himself posted the track on YouTube, to enthusiastic praise from viewers); "Swept Away" (a mid-tempo love song), "The Feeling Is Right Now" (produced, like "Fallen", by Steve Anderson, and written by Lulu), and "Nothing in This World", written by none other than Burt Bacharach and 1990s pop-R&B luminary Nigel Lowis (who worked extensively with Eternal, Dina Carroll and Michelle Gayle). These tracks remain virtually unheard and totally unreleased. Additionally, on the B-Side to "You Lift Me Up" was a cover of "Have I Told You Lately", which may or may not have appeared on Ryan's LP. Three other tracks, "Somewhere In Us", "Love's Comin' Right On Through" and "Just Can't Learn To Say Goodbye" from this unreleased album, have appeared on the music website SoundCloud.

In 2001, with a new recording contract, Ryan re-emerged with a totally different sound, style and image. Whereas before, her material had been dance-pop/soul, it was now rock-pop. Her album, Big Trouble (Lots of Fun) was released by Jive Records, despite the absence of a hit single to promote it. The album sold poorly. The lead single, "You Think You Got The Right", benefited from good reviews and promotion, but did not reach the UK Singles Chart. In 2002, still on Jive Records, Ryan released a re-edited version of the album, this time entitled I'll Live, and featuring another new single, "Can I Depend on You?"; neither release charted. The album, complete with new artwork, also omitted a few of the prior LP's tracks, yet added some more ones.

In 2007, Ryan was selected as one of the 12 finalists in the Over 25s category group on the ITV show, The X Factor. She returned to the programme in 2016, the judges put her through to boot camp. Personal life. She has had two babies, one of them deceased and she has been married and now divorced and plans to release new music in the future.

== Discography ==
=== Singles ===
List of singles
Year	Title	Peak chart positions
Year	Title	UK
1996	"You Lift Me Up"	26
1996	"Just A Little Bit of Love"	51
1997	"Woman in Love"	64
2001	"You Think You Got The Right"	109
2002	"Can I Depend on You?"	—
2016	"What I Need"	—

=== Albums ===
- Introduction, 1996, MCA Records (Limited-distribution 5-track EP from the debut unreleased album, which was given to DJs and music reviewers only.)
- Big Trouble (Lots of Fun), 2001, Jive Records
- I'll Live, 2002, Jive Records

== Filmography ==
Year	Title	Role
2016	The X Factor (UK, series 13)	Contestant
2002	Charmed	Herself
