= Here We Go Again (Sigma song) =

2019 song by Sigma featuring Louisa

Single by Sigma featuring Louisa

from the album Hope
- Released: 29 March 2019
- Recorded: 2018
- Length: 2:42
- Label: 3Beat
- Songwriters: Joe Lenzie; Annika Wells; Gang Wolf

Sigma singles chronology
"Say It" (2019)	"Here We Go Again" (2019)	"Dilemma" (2019)

Audio video
- "Here We Go Again" on YouTube

"Here We Go Again" is a song by English drum and bass duo Sigma, featuring vocals from English singer Louisa. It was released on 29 March 2019 by 3 Beat Records as the third single from the duo's second studio album, Hope. The song peaked at number 98 on the UK Singles Chart.

== Charts ==
Chart (2019)	Peak position
UK Singles (Official Charts)	98
