= Tears (Clean Bandit song) =

2016 single by Clean Bandit

Single by Clean Bandit featuring Louisa Johnson

from the album What Is Love?
- Released: 27 May 2016
- Recorded: 2016
- Genre: Electronic; dance-pop; house; classical crossover
- Length: 3:45
- Label: Atlantic; Warner
- Songwriters: Jack Patterson; Sam Romans
- Producers: Clean Bandit; Mark Ralph

Clean Bandit singles chronology
"Stronger" (2015)	"Tears" (2016)	"Rockabye" (2016)

Louisa Johnson singles chronology
"Forever Young" (2015)	"Tears" (2016)	"So Good" (2016)

Music video
- "Tears" on YouTube

"Tears" is a song by English electronic group Clean Bandit, featuring English singer Louisa Johnson. It was released on 27 May 2016. It is the last single to feature Neil Amin-Smith as violinist after his departure. Clean Bandit and Johnson performed the song with 5 After Midnight during the finals of The X Factor on 10 December 2016. It was included on the deluxe edition of the band's second studio album, What Is Love?

== Background ==
Jack Patterson said: "Tears is an epic trap-2step breakup ballad. I wrote it with Sam Romans at the piano, and over the course of a year, it has transformed from a simple piano tune into a mad beast of changing time signatures and feels. To me, Tears feels like a 1990s vision of a future breakup song."

== Music video ==
Directed by band member Jack Patterson, the music video features Johnson and the band in a room with burning instruments with water on the floor. The video also features a snowy owl that was one of several who had previously played Hedwig in the Harry Potter films. The video also features two dancers, Rhys Dennis and Kandaka Moore, which previously features on A+E.

== Track listing ==
Digital download
No.	Title	Length
1.	"Tears" (featuring Louisa Johnson)	3:45

Digital download - Acoustic Piano Version
No.	Title	Length
1.	"Tears" (featuring Louisa Johnson)	3:43

Digital download - Acoustic Piano Version [Instrumental]
No.	Title	Length
1.	"Tears" (featuring Louisa Johnson)	4:01

Digital download - 99 Souls Remix
No.	Title	Length
1.	"Tears" (featuring Louisa Johnson)	3:38

Digital download - Cedric Gervais Remix
No.	Title	Length
1.	"Tears" (featuring Louisa Johnson)	6:03

Digital download - Wideboys Remix
No.	Title	Length
1.	"Tears" (featuring Louisa Johnson)	4:46
2.	"Tears (featuring Louisa Johnson)" (Radio Edit)	3:14
3.	"Tears (featuring Louisa Johnson)" (Dub)	4:58

== Charts and certifications ==
=== Weekly charts ===
Chart (2016)	Peak position
Argentina (Monitor Latino)	12
Belgium (Ultratip Bubbling Under Flanders)	24
Belgium (Ultratip Bubbling Under Wallonia)	32
Belgium Dance (Ultratop Flanders)	19
Belgium Dance (Ultratop Wallonia)	38
Czech Republic Airplay (ČNS IFPI)	15
Czech Republic Singles Digital (ČNS IFPI)	74
Germany (GfK)	95
Hungary (Dance Top 40)	11
Hungary (Rádiós Top 40)	21
Hungary (Single Top 40)	6
Ireland (IRMA)	21
Israel International Airplay (Media Forest)	1
Latvia (Latvijas Top 40)	6
Netherlands (Dutch Top 40)	26
Netherlands (Single Top 100)	36
Mexico Airplay (Billboard)	8
New Zealand Heatseekers (Recorded Music NZ)	10
Poland Airplay (ZPAV)	45
Romania (Airplay 100)	37
Scotland Singles (OCC)	3
Slovakia Singles Digital (ČNS IFPI)	68
Sweden (Sverigetopplistan)	45
UK Dance (OCC)	3
UK Singles (OCC)	5
US Hot Dance/Electronic Songs (Billboard)	17

=== Year-end charts ===
Chart (2016)	Position
Argentina (Monitor Latino)	64
Hungary (Dance Top 40)	63
Hungary (Single Top 40)	55
UK Singles (Official Charts Company)	33
US Hot Dance/Electronic Songs (Billboard)	46

=== Certifications ===
Region	Certification	Certified units/sales
Italy (FIMI)	Gold	25,000^{‡}
New Zealand (RMNZ)	Gold	15,000^{‡}
Poland (ZPAV)	Platinum	50,000^{‡}
United Kingdom (BPI)	2× Platinum	1,200,000^{‡}
^{‡} Sales+streaming figures based on certification alone.
