= So Good (Louisa Johnson song) =

Single by Louisa Johnson
- Released: 28 October 2016
- Genre: Pop
- Length: 3:10
- Label: Syco
- Songwriter(s): Steve Mac; Chelcee Grimes; Ed Drewett
- Producer(s): Steve Mac

Louisa Johnson singles chronology
"Tears" (2016)	"So Good" (2016)	"Best Behaviour" (2017)

"So Good" is a song recorded by English singer Louisa Johnson. It was released on 28 October 2016, through Syco. It was written and produced by Steve Mac with additional writing from Chelcee Grimes and Ed Drewett.

== Track listing ==
Digital download
No.	Title	Length
1.	"So Good"	3:10

Digital download
No.	Title	Length
1.	"So Good" (Acoustic)	3:06

Digital download
No.	Title	Length
1.	"So Good" (Alex Adair Remix)	3:29

== Live performances ==
Johnson performed the song for the first time on The X Factor on 30 October 2016. Other major performances of the single include her performance during the Jingle Bell Ball 2016 & 2017, as well as the Summertime Ball 2017.

== Charts and certifications ==
=== Charts ===
Chart (2016)	Peak position
Hungary (Rádiós Top 40)	33
Ireland (IRMA)	37
Poland (Polish Airplay Top 100)	77
Scotland (OCC)	8
UK Singles (OCC)	13

=== Certifications ===
Region	Certification	Certified units/sales
United Kingdom (BPI)	Gold	400,000^{‡}
^{‡} Sales+streaming figures based on certification alone.
