= Louisa Johnson =

English singer (born 1998)

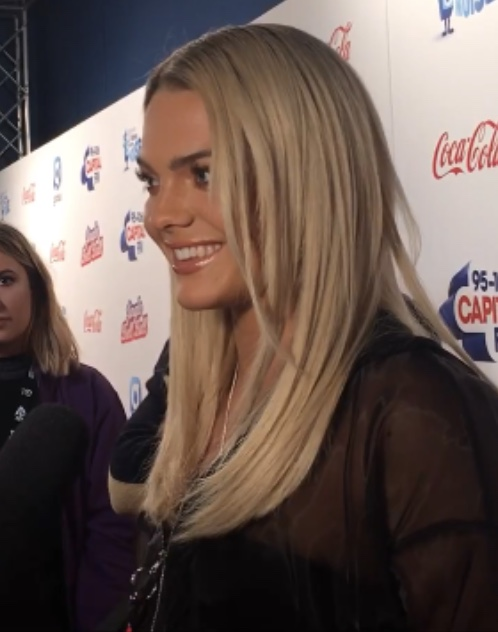
- Johnson in 2017

Background information
- Born: Louisa Johnson; 11 January 1998 (age 28); Thurrock, Essex, England
- Genres: Pop; R&B; dance-pop; soul
- Occupation: Singer
- Instrument: Vocals
- Years active: 2015–present
- Labels: Syco; Funky Frog
- Website: www.louisa-johnson.com

Louisa Johnson (born 11 January 1998) is an English singer. In 2015, she won the twelfth series of The X Factor. She subsequently released her winner's single "Forever Young", which peaked at number nine on the UK Singles Chart. In 2016, she was featured on Clean Bandit's UK top five single "Tears".

== Early life ==
Louisa Johnson was born on 11 January 1998 in Thurrock, Essex to David Johnson and Lisa Hawkyard. Her father is a construction worker from Essex and her mother is a driving instructor from Chafford Hundred. She was raised in Thurrock. Johnson attended St. Thomas of Canterbury primary school in Grays, Essex and The Harris Academy secondary school in Chafford Hundred.

== Career ==
=== 2015: The X Factor ===
In 2015, Johnson auditioned for the twelfth series of the UK series of The X Factor, singing American soul music family group The Jackson 5's "Who's Lovin' You". She picked this record because "it is a really really hard song to sing, but I wanted to make a good impression". She received a standing ovation from all four judges and the audience afterwards and progressed through to "bootcamp". At the first challenge at "bootcamp", she sang "Proud Mary" with 4th Impact (formerly known as 4th Power), Sherilyn Hamilton-Shaw, Neneth Lyons, Jasmine Leigh Morris and Andre Batchelor, and was sent through to the next challenge. She sang "Lay Me Down" in the second challenge and made it through to the six-chair challenge.

Johnson competed in the "girls" category at "bootcamp" and was mentored, at the decision of the public, by Rita Ora. She successfully made it past the six-chair challenge to "judges' houses", singing "And I Am Telling You I'm Not Going" by Jennifer Hudson; when Johnson arrived, all six chairs had been filled, and Ora described the atmosphere as "like a zoo". At judges' houses, she sang "Respect" by Aretha Franklin in front of Ora and American musician Meghan Trainor in Los Angeles; this performance gained media attention, as Johnson wore two separate pairs of shoes, with some viewers inferring some sort of faking. Two weeks after that performance was recorded, she was chosen by Ora for the live shows, along with Lauren Murray and Kiera Weathers; that category's Monica Michael later returned as a wildcard entry.

Following the eliminations of Weathers in the second week, Michael in the third week and Murray in the semi-final, Johnson advanced to the final along with Reggie 'n' Bollie and Ché Chesterman singing a cover version of "I Believe I Can Fly" by R Kelly; additionally becoming the final female in the competition. On 12 December, she duetted with her mentor, Ora. The following night, she sang her winner's single, a cover of "Forever Young" by Bob Dylan. On 13 December 2015, she won The X Factor, becoming the first winner in the Girls category since Alexandra Burke in 2008, and also the youngest winner of the UK version, overtaking Joe McElderry, who was 18 years old when he won in 2009.

The X Factor performances and results (2015)
Show	Song choice	Theme	Result
Auditions	"Who's Lovin' You"	—N/a	Through to bootcamp
Bootcamp – challenge 1	"Proud Mary" (with 4th Power, Sherilyn Hamilton-Shaw, Neneth Lyons, Jasmine Leigh Morris and Andre Batchelor)	—N/a	Through to challenge 2
Bootcamp – challenge 2	"Lay Me Down"	—N/a	Through to six-chair challenge
Six-chair challenge	"And I Am Telling You I'm Not Going"	—N/a	Through to judges' houses
Judges' houses	"Respect"	—N/a	Through to live shows
Live show 1	"God Only Knows"	This Is Me	Safe
Live show 2	"Billie Jean"	Reinvention	Safe
Live show 3	"Everybody's Free (To Feel Good)"	Movie week	Safe
Live show 4	"Let It Go"	Love & Heartbreak	Safe
Quarter-Final	"Love Yourself"	Jukebox	Safe
Quarter-Final	"Jealous"	Judges' choice	Safe
Semi-Final	"The Power of Love"	Songs to get me to the final	Safe
Semi-Final	"It's a Man's Man's Man's World"	Songs to get me to the final	Safe
Final	"I Believe I Can Fly"	New song	Safe
Final	"And I Am Telling You I'm Not Going" (with Rita Ora)	Celebrity duet	Safe
Final	"It's a Man's Man's Man's World"	Favourite performance	Winner
Final	"Forever Young"	Winner's single	Winner

After winning The X Factor, Johnson released "Forever Young". The day after her victory, she plugged the single on The X Factor judge Nick Grimshaw's radio show, Good Morning Britain, Lorraine and This Morning, consecutively. Her version of the song entered the UK Singles Chart on 18 December 2015 at number 9, and became the lowest ever position on entry for a debut single from an X Factor winner. This can be attributed, in part, to the movement of the chart day from Sunday, when she was announced as the winner, to Friday, resulting in her single only receiving four days' sales. The single dropped to number twelve the following week becoming the lowest ranking X Factor winner's song ever on the Christmas Day chart. Overall, the single is the lowest charting X Factor winner's single to date as all other winner's singles managed to top the chart or at least reach the top five. On 18 December 2015, Johnson performed "Forever Young" on the 2015 Text Santa broadcast.

=== 2016–present: Collaborations and label change ===
There were indications that her debut studio album would be released as quickly as possible, maybe as early as February 2016, and would include her debut single "Forever Young". However, the singer later declared: "If I don't like it, no way is it going out. People are going to know me through that album – so it needs to be perfect."

In May 2016, Johnson released a single with British band Clean Bandit called "Tears". The song was a commercial success, reaching the top five in Scotland and the UK, and charting in many other European countries. It was also certified platinum by the British Phonographic Industry (BPI). In June, she performed "Tears" with Clean Bandit and a new version of the song "Over and Over Again" with Nathan Sykes at the Summertime Ball. She co-headlined the concert the following year, and appeared as a guest performer in 2018.

Johnson released her second solo single, "So Good", in November 2016. The single peaked at number 13 in the UK, and received a gold certification from BPI. The following month, Johnson co-headlined both nights of the annual Jingle Bell Ball at London's O2 Arena; she co-headlined the concert for second consecutive year in 2017. Her third single, "Best Behaviour" was released in March 2017. It charted at number 48 in the UK, and was certified silver by BPI. In 2017, she also featured on Olly Murs' single "Unpredictable", which reached number 32 on the official UK singles chart and received a silver certification from BPI. In March 2018, Johnson released her fourth single, "Yes", a collaboration with the American rapper 2 Chainz, which peaked at number 65 in the UK.

On 13 July 2018, Johnson announced via social media that she had left Syco. She also announced the release of her new single for early August with Ministry of Sound. The single "Between You & Me", recorded in collaboration with One Bit, was released on 10 August 2018. Later that month, she was featured on Mars Moniz's single "999". In 2019, she collaborated with Sigma on the single "Here We Go Again" which charted in the UK at number 98. She also featured on Kream and Eden Prince's single "Ain't Thinkin Bout You", and released "Ain't Got You" with Steve Void in 2019.

In January 2020, Johnson announced a collaboration with fitness clothing brand USA Pro. Following the announcement, she released "Like I Love Me" to promote the collaboration. For the artwork of the single, Johnson posed completely nude, being photographed sitting down in front of a plain backdrop, with one leg raised towards her and the other one spread out.

In September 2022, she released a collaboration with Jonas Blue titled "Always Be There".

== Personal life ==
In 2017, Johnson spoke about her friendship with former X Factor mentor Rita Ora, stating that she was "still in touch with Rita".

In 2018, Johnson faced backlash for multiple homophobic tweets she had made as a schoolgirl in 2013, which included the repeated use of the homophobic slur "faggot". She apologised for the tweets, saying, "I was young and foolish, and hanging around with the wrong crowd & didn’t know any better."

== Discography ==
=== Singles ===
==== As lead artist ====
Title	Year	Peak chart positions			Certifications	Album
Title	Year	UK	IRE	SCO	Certifications	Album
"Forever Young"	2015	9	5	2		Non-album singles
"So Good"	2016	13	37	8	BPI: Gold	Non-album singles
"Best Behaviour"	2017	48	71	22	BPI: Silver	Non-album singles
"Unpredictable" (with Olly Murs)	2017	32	65	20	BPI: Gold	24 Hrs
"Yes" (featuring 2 Chainz)	2018	65	72	27		Non-album singles
"Between You & Me" (with One Bit)	2018	—	—	—		Non-album singles
"Ain't Got You" (with Steve Void)	2019	—	—	—		Non-album singles
"Like I Love Me"	2020	—	—	—		Non-album singles
"Always Be There" (with Jonas Blue)	2022	—	—	—		Together
"Who You Are" (with Toby Gad)	2024	—	—	—		Piano Dairies
"—" denotes items which were not released in that country or failed to chart.

==== As featured artist ====
Title	Year	Peak chart positions									Certifications	Album
Title	Year	UK	BEL (FL) Tip	GER	IRE	NLD	NZ Heat.	SCO	SWE	US Dance	Certifications	Album
"Tears" (Clean Bandit featuring Louisa Johnson)	2016	5	24	95	21	26	10	3	45	17	BPI: 2× Platinum; FIMI: Gold; IRMA: Gold; RMNZ: Gold	What Is Love?
"Weak (Stay Strong Mix)" (AJR featuring Louisa Johnson)	2017	58	—	—	—	—	—	23	—	—		Non-album singles
"Bridge over Troubled Water" (as part of Artists for Grenfell)	2017	1	26	—	25	—	4	1	—	—	BPI: Silver	Non-album singles
"With a Little Help from My Friends" (as part of NHS Voices)	2018	89	—	—	—	—	—	26	—	—		Non-album singles
"999" (Mars Moniz featuring Wusu and Louisa)	2018	—	—	—	—	—	—	—	—	—		Non-album singles
"Here We Go Again" (Sigma featuring Louisa)	2019	98	—	—	—	—	—	—	—	—		Hope
"Ain't Thinkin Bout You" (Kream and Eden Prince featuring Louisa)	2019	—	—	—	—	—	—	—	—	—		Non-album single
"—" denotes items which were not released in that country or failed to chart.

=== Guest appearances ===
List of guest appearances, showing year released and album name
Title	Year	Other Artist	Album
"Leave the Light On"	2025	Craig David	Commitment

== Concert tours ==
Co-headliner

- The X Factor Live Tour (2016)

Supporting

- Olly Murs's Summer Tour (2017 – Leg 2)
- Little Mix's The Glory Days Tour (2017)
- Westlife's The Wild Dreams Tour (2022)

Awards and achievements
Preceded by Ben Haenow	Winner of The X Factor; 2015	Succeeded by Matt Terry
Preceded by Something I Need	Winner's singles of The X Factor; Forever Young	Succeeded by When Christmas Comes Around
