= Best Behaviour (Louisa Johnson song) =

Single by Louisa Johnson
- Released: 3 March 2017
- Genre: Dance-pop
- Length: 3:35
- Label: Syco
- Songwriters: TMS; Shungudzo Kuyimba; Danny Parker
- Producer: TMS

Louisa Johnson singles chronology
| "So Good" (2016) | "Best Behaviour" (2017) | "Weak (Stay Strong Mix)" (2017) |

"Best Behaviour" is a song by British singer Louisa Johnson. It was released as a single on 3 March 2017. The track was written by TMS, Shungudzo Kuyimba, and Danny Parker. A remix featuring English rapper Stefflon Don was released on April 14, 2017.

== Music video ==
The music video for "Best Behaviour" was filmed in the desert of Los Angeles. It was directed by Sarah Chatfield, who also directed the music video for Little Mix's "Shout Out to My Ex". Johnson described the video as "quite flirty and very fun at the same time. It's quite up tempo so you can dance to it."

== Track listing ==
Taken from iTunes.

| No. | Title | Length |
|---|---|---|
| 1. | "Best Behaviour" | 3:35 |

== Commercial performance ==
"Best Behaviour" debuted and peaked at number 48 in the UK, spending a total of twelve weeks on the chart. In Scotland, it debuted and peaked at number 22, while reaching number 71 in Ireland.

== Charts and certifications ==
=== Charts ===
| Chart (2017) | Peak position |
|---|---|
| Bulgaria (PROPHON) | 3 |
| Ireland (IRMA) | 71 |
| Scotland (Official Charts Company) | 22 |
| UK Singles (OCC) | 48 |

=== Certifications ===
| Region | Certification | Certified units/sales |
|---|---|---|
| United Kingdom (BPI) | Silver | 200,000^{‡} |
^{‡} Sales+streaming figures based on certification alone.
