= Matt Terry =

English singer and songwriter (born 1993)

- Born: Matthew James Terry; 20 May 1993 (age 33); London, England
- Occupations: Singer; songwriter
- Instrument: Vocals
- Years active: 2016–present
- Labels: Syco; RCA

Matthew James Terry (born 20 May 1993) is an English singer, songwriter and actor. In 2016, he was crowned as the winner of the thirteenth series of The X Factor. His debut single, "When Christmas Comes Around", which was released on 11 December 2016, peaked at number three on the UK Singles Chart. His debut album, Trouble was released on 24 November 2017 and charted at 29 on the UK Albums Chart.

== Career ==
=== 2016: The X Factor ===
Terry auditioned for the thirteenth series of The X Factor in 2016, singing a cover of Ben E. King's "Stand by Me", which earned him four yes votes from the judges.

Terry was placed in the "boys" category and reached the live shows, where he was mentored by Nicole Scherzinger. Following the eliminations of Freddy Parker in week 2 and Ryan Lawrie in week 7, Terry became Scherzinger's last act left in the competition. In the semi-final, he ended up in the bottom two and faced the sing-off against Emily Middlemas. Scherzinger, Louis Walsh and Sharon Osbourne voted to send him through to the final.

On 11 December 2016, he was crowned as the winner of The X Factor 2016, over Saara Aalto, making him the second winner, after James Arthur, to be in the bottom two at any given stage of the competition. He immediately released his winner's single, "When Christmas Comes Around", an original song written by Ed Sheeran. It is the second time that the winner has released an original winner's song, the first being the second series winner Shayne Ward, who released his debut single "That's My Goal". Following his win, Terry signed with RCA Records.

The X Factor performances and results
Show	Song choice	Theme	Result
Auditions	"Stand by Me" – Ben E. King	—N/a	Through to bootcamp
Bootcamp	"See You Again" – Charlie Puth (with Tom and Laura, and Aeron Smith)	—N/a	Through to six-chair challenge
Six-chair challenge	"When I Was Your Man" – Bruno Mars/"Secret Love Song" – Little Mix (sing-off song against Christian Burrows)	—N/a	Through to judges' houses
Judges' houses	"She's Out of My Life" – Michael Jackson	—N/a	Through to live shows
Live show 1	"You Don't Own Me" – Grace	Express Yourself	Safe (1st)
Live show 2	"I Heard It Through the Grapevine" – Marvin Gaye	Motown	Safe (1st)
Live show 3	"I'll Be There" – The Jackson 5	Divas & Legends	Safe (1st)
Live show 4	"I Put a Spell on You" – Screamin' Jay Hawkins	Fright Night	Safe (2nd)
Live show 5	"I'm Your Man" – Wham!	Girlband vs Boyband	Safe (1st)
Live show 6	"Best of My Love" – The Emotions	Disco	Safe (3rd)
Live show 7	"Writing's on the Wall" – Sam Smith	Movies	Safe (1st)
Quarter-final	"Secret Love Song, Pt. II" – Little Mix	Louis Loves	Safe (2nd)
Quarter-final	"Alive" – Sia	Contestant's Choice	Safe (2nd)
Semi-final	"Silent Night" – traditional	Christmas	Bottom two (3rd)
Semi-final	"Say You Love Me" – Jessie Ware	Contestant's Choice	Bottom two (3rd)
Semi-final	"Hurt" – Christina Aguilera	Sing-off	Safe (majority vote)
Final	"Take Me Home" – Jess Glynne	New song	Safe (2nd)
Final	"Purple Rain" with Nicole Scherzinger	Celebrity duet	Safe (2nd)
Final	"Writing's on the Wall" – Sam Smith	Song of the Series	Winner
Final	"One Day I'll Fly Away" – Randy Crawford	No theme	Winner
Final	"When Christmas Comes Around"	Winner's Single	Winner

=== 2017-2019: Trouble and dropped by RCA ===
In 2017, Terry featured in a new version of "Súbeme la Radio", with Enrique Iglesias and Sean Paul. The single peaked at number 10 on the UK Singles Chart, and sold 200,000 certified units, scoring a Silver BPI certification.

Following that, he released the first single from his debut album, "Sucker For You". The single peaked at 51 on the UK Singles Chart. A second single, a ballad called "The Thing About Love" was released afterwards. He performed the single on The X Factor as a guest performer. After the performance, he confirmed that the album would be released on 24 November 2017. The single peaked at 51 on the UK Singles Chart. Upon release, Terry's album peaked at 29 on the UK Albums Chart.

In June 2018, Terry was dropped by RCA Records. The next month, he made his acting debut in the UK production of Madagascar – The Musical.

In 2019, he returned to the Madagascar musical, portraying the role of Alex the Lion.

=== 2023–present: Returning music ===
On 1 October 2023, Terry announced his first single in over 4 years titled "You Don't Know Nothing" available on 13 October 2023 on all platforms. On 9 February 2024, Terry released his new song "Ghost of me". His single, "His Car", was released on 22 March 2024. The single dealt with the singer opening up about being gay.

== Personal life ==
On 22 March 2024, Terry revealed he is gay.

== Discography ==
- Trouble (2017)

== Tours ==
- The X Factor Live Tour (2017)

=== Stage ===
- Madagascar – The Musical (2018–2019)
- How The Grinch Stole Christmas - The Musical (2019)
- Cinderella Panto Crewe Lyceum Theatre (2023)

Awards and achievements
Preceded by Louisa Johnson	Winner of The X Factor; 2016	Succeeded by Rak-Su
Preceded by Forever Young	Winner's singles of The X Factor; When Christmas Comes Around	Succeeded by Dimelo
