= When Christmas Comes Around (song) =

Single by Matt Terry
- Released: 11 December 2016
- Recorded: 6 December 2016
- Genre: Christmas; pop
- Length: 3:20
- Label: Syco
- Songwriters: Ed Sheeran; Amy Wadge
- Producer: Julian Bunetta

Matt Terry singles chronology
"When Christmas Comes Around" (2016)	"Súbeme la Radio" (2017)

"When Christmas Comes Around" is the debut single by English singer Matt Terry. The song was written by Ed Sheeran and Amy Wadge and was released as the winner's single of thirteenth series of The X Factor on 11 December 2016. All the record company profits from Terry's single were shared equally between two charities: Together for Short Lives and Shooting Star CHASE. It was the sixth year running that the UK's Chancellor of the Exchequer waived VAT on The X Factor's winner's single.

It is the second time in the show's history that a UK X Factor winner has released an original winner's single. The only other original was that of second series winner Shayne Ward and his debut single "That's My Goal". It was also the first winner's single that was not performed by the winner or runner-up until the results were unveiled.

== Chart performance ==
On 16 December 2016, the song debuted at Number 31 on the Irish Singles Chart. The same day, it debuted at Number 2 on the Scottish Singles Chart and Number 3 on the UK Singles Chart. The song, however, was the most downloaded and top selling single throughout the five-days since the release in the UK with the lack of streams and three-days-disadvantage (the chart starts counting sales and streams on Friday, but this song was released on Sunday night) influencing the overall chart position to be lower.

The song eventually peaked at Number 28 in Ireland on 23 December, but fell to Number 8 in the UK that same week. On 30 December, the song fell further to Number 20 in the UK and dropped to Number 50 in Ireland in the same week. The song dropped out of the Irish Charts on 7 January, while falling 76 places to Number 96 in the UK that same week.

== Track listing ==
Digital download
No.	Title	Length
1.	"When Christmas Comes Around"	3:20

== Charts ==
=== Weekly charts ===
Chart (2016–17)	Peak position
Finland Download (Latauslista)	14
Ireland (IRMA)	28
Scotland Singles (OCC)	2
UK Singles (OCC)	3

== Certifications ==
Certifications for When Christmas Comes Around
Region	Certification	Certified units/sales
United Kingdom (BPI)	Silver	200,000^{‡}
^{‡} Sales+streaming figures based on certification alone.

== Release history ==
Region	Date	Format	Label
United Kingdom	11 December 2016	Digital download	Syco; Sony
