= Súbeme la Radio =

Single by Enrique Iglesias featuring Descemer Bueno and Zion & Lennox

from the album Final (Vol. 1)
- Language: Spanish
- English title: "Turn Up the Radio"
- Released: 24 February 2017
- Genre: Latin Pop, Reggaeton
- Length: 3:28
- Label: RCA; Sony Latin
- Songwriters: Enrique Iglesias; Descemer Bueno; Carlos Ortiz; Felix Ortiz; Gabriel Pizarro; Juan Rivera; Luis Ortiz
- Producers: Chris Jedi; Carlos Paucar; Gaby Music

Enrique Iglesias singles chronology
"Don't You Need Somebody" (2016)	"Súbeme la Radio" (2017)	"El Baño" (2018)

Zion & Lennox singles chronology
"Otra Vez" (2016)	"Súbeme La Radio" (2017)	"Mi Tesoro" (2017)

Music video
- "Súbeme la Radio" on YouTube

"Súbeme la Radio" (Spanish pronunciation: [ˈsuβeme la ˈraðjo]; transl. "Turn Up the Radio for Me") is a song by Spanish singer Enrique Iglesias featuring Cuban singer Descemer Bueno and Puerto Rican reggaeton duo Zion & Lennox. The song was released by RCA Records and Sony Music Latin on 24 February 2017. It was written by Iglesias, Zion & Lennox, Bueno, Chris Jedi, Juan Rivera and Luis Ortiz, and produced by Jeday, Carlos Paucar and Gaby Music. "Súbeme la Radio" peaked at number two in Spain and on the US Hot Latin Songs chart.

== Background ==
Several remixes were commissioned for the release of "Súbeme la Radio", including one with Cuban singer Jacob Forever instead of Zion & Lennox, one featuring Latin American pop boy band CNCO and a salsa version of the song was recorded with Puerto Rican singer Gilberto Santa Rosa. A Spanglish remix, featuring Jamaican singer Sean Paul, replacing Descemer Bueno and Zion & Lennox, was also released. It was sent to US contemporary hit radio on 25 July 2017.

Another Spanglish version of the song was released on 21 July 2017, featuring Paul and English singer Matt Terry who sings the second verse, instead of Iglesias. This version reached the top 10 on the UK Singles Chart.

== Music video ==
On his official Facebook page, Iglesias teased that the single would be released on 24 February 2017, along with the music video, which was filmed in Cuba. The video features Iglesias with the guest artists inside and on top of a bus at different scenes. It shows Enrique falling in love with a Cuban woman and he follows her through the streets. It also features a big crowd participation surrounding the performers as they sing and dance along with them. The music video was directed by Alejandro Pérez and was produced by Yasha Malekzad and Kasra Pezeshki. As of April 2026, the video has received over 1.6 billion views on YouTube.

== Track listing ==
Digital download
No.	Title	Length
1.	"Súbeme La Radio" (featuring Descemer Bueno and Zion & Lennox)	3:28

Digital download – Remix
No.	Title	Length
1.	"Súbeme La Radio" (featuring Descemer Bueno and Jacob Forever)	3:27

Digital download – Remix
No.	Title	Length
1.	"Súbeme La Radio" (featuring Descemer Bueno, zion & lennox and CNCO)	3:24

Digital download – Remix
No.	Title	Length
1.	"Súbeme La Radio" (featuring Sean Paul)	3:27

Digital download – Remix
No.	Title	Length
1.	"Súbeme La Radio" (featuring Sean Paul and Matt Terry)	3:27

Digital download – Salsa version
No.	Title	Length
1.	"Súbeme La Radio" (featuring Descemer Bueno, Zion & Lennox and Gilberto Santa Rosa)	3:59

Digital download – Portuguese remix
No.	Title	Length
1.	"Súbeme La Radio" (featuring Descemer Bueno, Anselmo Ralph, Zé Felipe and Ender Thomas)	3:27

Digital download – Hebrew remix
No.	Title	Length
1.	"Súbeme La Radio" (featuring Descemer Bueno, Rotem Cohen, Zion & Lennox)	3:27

== Charts ==
=== Weekly charts ===
Chart (2017–2018)	Peak position
Australia (ARIA)	141
Argentina (Monitor Latino)	3
Austria (Ö3 Austria Top 40)	7
Belgium (Ultratop 50 Flanders)	12
Belgium (Ultratop 50 Wallonia)	2
Bulgaria (PROPHON)	5
Bolivia (Monitor Latino)	2
Brazil Pop Airplay (Billboard Brasil)	2
Canada Hot 100 (Billboard)	71
Chile (Monitor Latino)	7
Colombia (National-Report)	17
Croatia (HRT)	1
Czech Republic Airplay (ČNS IFPI)	1
Czech Republic Singles Digital (ČNS IFPI)	18
Ecuador (National-Report)	6
France (SNEP)	8
Germany (GfK)	15
Guatemala (Monitor Latino)	2
Hungary (Dance Top 40)	18
Hungary (Rádiós Top 40)	7
Hungary (Single Top 40)	4
Hungary (Stream Top 40)	17
Ireland (IRMA)	51
Italy (FIMI)	3
Lebanon (Lebanese Top 20)	6
Mexico (Monitor Latino)	4
Mexico (Billboard Mexican Airplay)	1
Netherlands (Dutch Top 40)	10
Netherlands (Single Top 100)	25
Norway (VG-lista)	12
Panama (Monitor Latino)	9
Paraguay (Monitor Latino)	1
Peru (Monitor Latino)	10
Poland Airplay (ZPAV)	6
Portugal (AFP)	9
Romania (Media Forest)	1
Scotland Singles (Official Charts)	3
Slovakia Airplay (ČNS IFPI)	4
Slovakia Singles Digital (ČNS IFPI)	16
Slovenia (SloTop50)	1
Spain (Promusicae)	2
Sweden (Sverigetopplistan)	14
Switzerland (Schweizer Hitparade)	3
UK Singles (Official Charts)	10
Ukraine Airplay (Tophit)	65
Uruguay (Monitor Latino)	4
US Billboard Hot 100	81
US Dance Club Songs (Billboard)	17
US Hot Latin Songs (Billboard)	2
US Latin Airplay (Billboard)	1

=== Year-end charts ===
Chart (2017)	Position
Argentina (Monitor Latino)	6
Austria (Ö3 Austria Top 40)	22
Belgium (Ultratop Flanders)	35
Belgium (Ultratop Wallonia)	12
France (SNEP)	79
Germany (Official German Charts)	33
Hungary (Dance Top 40)	47
Hungary (Rádiós Top 40)	25
Hungary (Single Top 40)	11
Hungary (Stream Top 40)	38
Italy (FIMI)	7
Netherlands (Dutch Top 40)	32
Netherlands (Single Top 100)	61
Poland (ZPAV)	49
Romania (Airplay 100)	23
Slovenia (SloTop50)	7
Spain (PROMUSICAE)	5
Sweden (Sverigetopplistan)	50
Switzerland (Schweizer Hitparade)	6
US Hot Latin Songs (Billboard)	7
US Latin Airplay (Billboard)	3

Chart (2018)	Position
Hungary (Single Top 40)	84

== Certifications ==
Region	Certification	Certified units/sales
Austria (IFPI Austria)	Platinum	30,000^{‡}
Belgium (BRMA)	Platinum	20,000^{‡}
Brazil (Pro-Música Brasil)	3× Platinum	180,000^{‡}
Canada (Music Canada)	2× Platinum	160,000^{‡}
Denmark (IFPI Danmark)	Platinum	90,000^{‡}
France (SNEP)	Diamond	333,333^{‡}
Germany (BVMI)	Platinum	400,000^{‡}
Italy (FIMI)	5× Platinum	250,000^{‡}
Mexico (AMPROFON)	Diamond+Gold	330,000^{‡}
Norway (IFPI Norway)	Platinum	40,000^{‡}
Poland (ZPAV)	4× Platinum	80,000^{‡}
Portugal (AFP)	Platinum	10,000^{‡}
Spain (Promusicae)	5× Platinum	200,000^{‡}
Sweden (GLF)	2× Platinum	80,000^{‡}
Switzerland (IFPI Switzerland)	4× Platinum	80,000^{‡}
United Kingdom (BPI)	Platinum	600,000^{‡}
United States (RIAA)	4× Platinum (Latin)	240,000^{‡}
^{‡} Sales+streaming figures based on certification alone.

== See also ==
- List of Billboard number-one Latin songs of 2017
