= List of artists who reached number one on the UK Singles Downloads Chart =

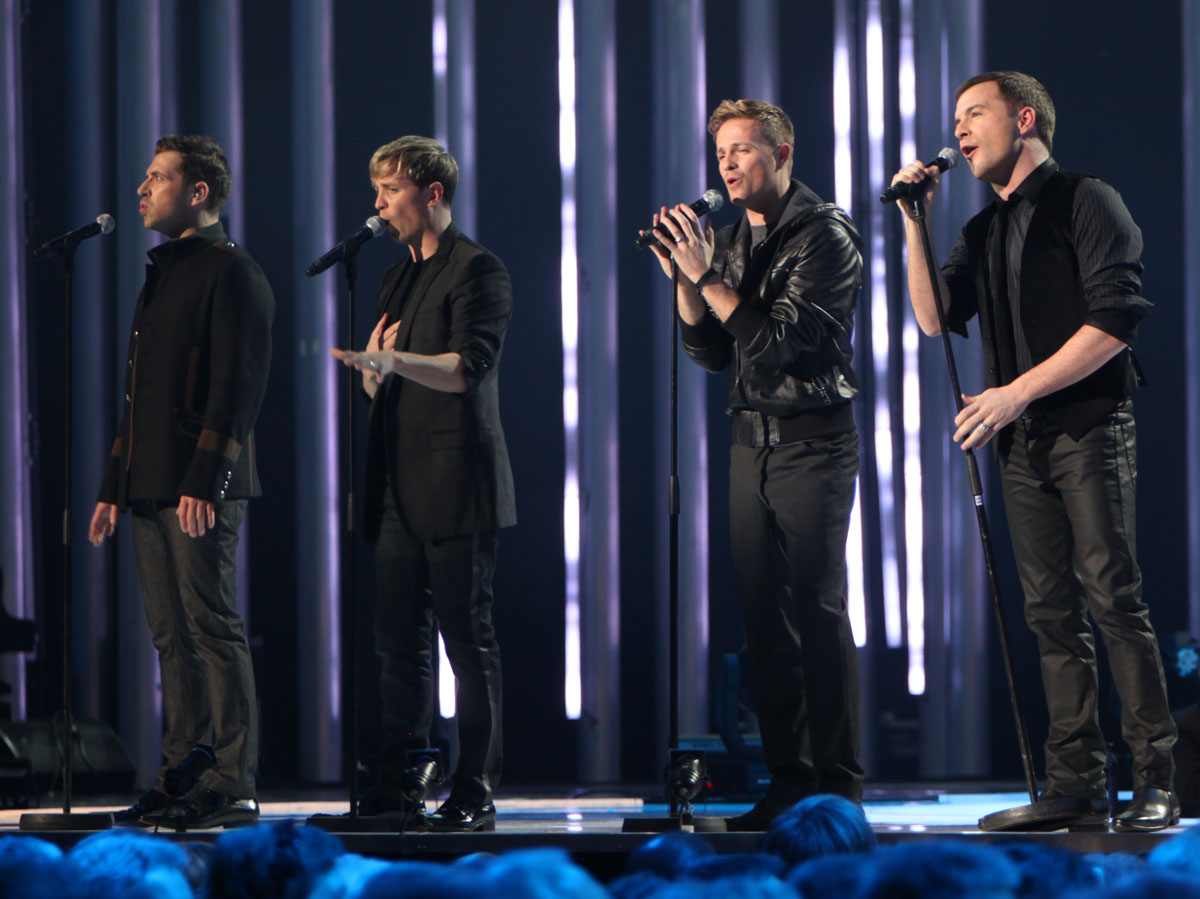
Irish boy band Westlife were the first ever artist to top the UK Singles Downloads Chart.

The UK Singles Downloads Chart is a weekly music chart that ranks most-downloaded songs in the United Kingdom over the past seven days. It is compiled by the Official Charts Company on behalf of the British music industry, and is based solely on non-subscription downloads of songs from official music retailers. The chart was founded in 2004 and was first published on 1 September that year. The first ever number one was "Flying Without Wings" by Irish boy band Westlife. Since then, as of 30 August 2024, 500 different tracks have reached number-one on the UK Singles Downloads Chart. The following table lists those artists. The totals do not include non-credited appearances (such as those on multiple-artist charity ensembles), although they are listed below.

== Artists ==
Key
[x]	Indicates that, with this single, the artist became the first act to have six number one singles
†	Christmas number one

Artist	Single(s)	Record label(s)	Reached number one	Weeks at number one	Notes
2 Chainz	"Talk Dirty"	Warner	22 September 2013	2	Featured artist
5 Seconds of Summer	"She Looks So Perfect"	Capitol	24 March 2014	1	
220 Kid	"Wellerman"	Polydor	29 January 2021	6	
Artist	Singles	Record labels	Reached number one	Weeks at number one	Notes
Adele	"Chasing Pavements"	Beggars	6 February 2008	1	
Adele	"Someone Like You"	Beggars	23 February 2011	5	As of 9 April 2013, the most-downloaded single in the UK
Adele	"Hello"	Beggars	5 November 2015	5	
Adele	"Easy on Me"	Columbia	22 October 2021	2	
Afrojack	"Give Me Everything"	Sony	25 May 2011	3	Featured artist
Akon	"Sexy Chick"	EMI	26 August 2009	2	Featured artist
Alexandra Burke (Note: Also featured as part of the 2008 X Factor Finalists on the number-one single "Hero".) (Note: Also featured as part of Helping Haiti on the number-one single "Everybody Hurts".)	"Hallelujah" †	Sony	24 December 2008	3	2008 Christmas number one
Alexandra Burke	"Bad Boys"	Sony	21 October 2009	1	
Alexandra Burke	"Start Without You"	Sony	15 September 2010	2	
Alex Warren	"Ordinary"	Atlantic	3 April 2025	7	
Alex Warren	"Fever Dream"	Atlantic	6 March 2026	2	
All Saints	"Rock Steady"	EMI	15 November 2006	1	
Aloe Blacc	"The Man"	Universal	6 April 2014	1	Aloe Blacc was also the uncredited singer on "Wake Me Up" by Avicii
A*M*E	"Need U (100%)"	Ministry of Sound	7 April 2013	2	One-hit wonder
Amelle Berrabah (Note: Also featured as part of Sugababes on the number-one single "About You Now".)	"Never Leave You"	Universal	12 August 2009	1	Featured artist
Andriy Khlyvnyuk	"Hey, Hey, Rise Up!"	Rhino	15 April 2022	1	Featured artist; one-hit wonder
Andy Pipkin	"I'm Gonna Be (500 Miles)"	EMI	21 March 2007	3	Featured artist; one-hit wonder
André Rieu and Johann Strauss Orchestra	"Ode To Joy"	Decca	6 February 2020	1	one-hit wonder
Anne-Marie	"Don't Play"	Atlantic	22 January 2021	1	
Anne-Marie	"Our Song"	Atlantic	17 June 2021	1	
Anne-Marie	"Everywhere"	Atlantic	2 December 2021	1	
Ariana Grande	"Problem"	Universal	6 July 2014	1	
Ariana Grande	"Bang Bang"	Universal	28 September 2014	1	Co-credit with Jessie J and Nicki Minaj
Ariana Grande	"One Last Time"	Universal	9 June 2017	1	
Ariana Grande	"No Tears Left to Cry"	Universal	27 April 2018	1	
Ariana Grande	"Thank U, Next"	Universal	9 November 2018	6	
Ariana Grande	"7 Rings"	Universal	25 January 2019	4	
Ariana Grande	"Don't Call Me Angel"	Universal	20 September 2019	1	Co-credit with Miley Cyrus and Lana Del Rey
Ariana Grande	"Rain on Me"	Universal	29 May 2020	4	Co-credit with Lady Gaga
Ariana Grande	"Yes, And?"	Universal	19 January 2024	1	
Ariana Grande	"Hate That I Made You Love Me"	Republic	5 June 2026	1	
Armand Van Helden	"Bonkers"	Dirtee Stank	27 May 2009	2	Co-credit with Dizzee Rascal
Artists From Grenfell	"Bridge Over Troubled Water"	Sony	23 June 2017	2	
Asian Dub Foundation	"Comin' Over Here"	Xray	2 January 2021	1	
Ava Max	"Sweet But Psycho"	Universal	6 December 2018	4	
Avery Storm	"Nasty Girl"	Warner	25 January 2006	2	Featured artist; one-hit wonder
Avicii	"I Could Be the One"	Universal	17 February 2013	1	Co-credit with Nicky Romero
Avicii	"Wake Me Up!"	Universal	21 July 2013	3	Aloe Blacc is the uncredited singer on this song
Avicii	"Hey Brother"	Universal	15 December 2013	1	
Avril Lavigne	"Girlfriend"	Sony	11 April 2007	1	
Artist	Singles	Record label	Reached number one	Weeks at number one	Notes
Band Aid 20	"Do They Know It's Christmas?" †	Universal	8 December 2004	4	Multiple-artist ensemble; one-hit wonder; 2004 Christmas number one
Band Aid 30	"Do They Know It's Christmas?"	EMI	29 November 2014	2	
Basshunter	"Now You're Gone"	Hard2Beat	16 January 2008	3	Featuring DJ Mental Theo's Bazzheadz
Bastille	"Of the Night"	Universal	24 November 2013	1	Cover of the Corona's "The Rhythm of the Night"
BBC Radio 2 Allstars	"Stop Crying Your Heart Out"	Decca	20 November 2020	1	For Children in Need 2020
The Beatles	"Now and Then"	Apple	3 November 2023	1	
Bebe Rexha	"I'm Good (Blue)"	Parlophone	9 September 2022	7	
Bebe Rexha	"New Religion"	Bebe Rexha Music/Empire	20 March 2026	1	
Becky Hill	"Gecko (Overdrive)"	Universal	5 July 2014	1	Co-credit with Oliver Heldens
Ben Haenow	"Something I Need"	Sony	27 December 2014	1	2014 Christmas number one
Beyoncé	"Beautiful Liar"	Sony	25 April 2007	3	Co-credit with Shakira
Beyoncé	"If I Were a Boy"	Sony	26 November 2008	1	
Beyoncé	"Telephone"	Universal	31 March 2010	1	Featured artist
Beyoncé	"Break My Soul"	Columbia/Parkwood	5 August 2022	1	
Beyoncé	"Texas Hold 'Em"	Columbia/Parkwood	16 February 2024	7	
Billen Ted	"Wellerman"	Polydor	29 January 2021	6	
Billie Eilish	"No Time to Die"	Interscope	27 February 2020	1	
Bingo Players	"Get Up (Rattle)"	Ministry of Sound	27 January 2013	2	
The Black Eyed Peas	"Don't Phunk with My Heart"	Universal	18 May 2005	2	
The Black Eyed Peas	"Boom Boom Pow"	Universal	20 May 2009	2	
The Black Eyed Peas	"I Gotta Feeling"	Universal	5 August 2009	2	
The Black Eyed Peas	"Meet Me Halfway"	Universal	18 November 2009	1	
The Black Eyed Peas	"The Time (Dirty Bit)"	Universal	15 December 2010	1	
B.o.B	"Nothin' on You"	Warner	26 May 2010	1	
B.o.B	"Airplanes"	Warner	28 July 2010	1	
B.o.B	"Price Tag"	Universal	9 February 2011	2	Featured artist
Borgeous	"Tsunami (Jump)"	Ministry of Sound	16 March 2014	1	
Bradley Cooper	"Shallow"	Universal	18 October 2018	4	
Britney Spears	"Scream & Shout"	Universal	13 January 2013	3	Featured artist
Britney Spears	"Hold Me Closer"	RCA	2 September 2022	1	
Bruce Springsteen	"Streets of Minneapolis"	Columbia	6 February 2026	1	
Bruno Mars	"Nothin' on You"	Columbia	26 May 2010	1	Featured artist
Bruno Mars	"Just the Way You Are"	Warner	29 September 2010	3	
Bruno Mars	"Grenade"	Warner	19 January 2011	2	
Bruno Mars	"The Lazy Song"	Warner	18 May 2011	1	
Bruno Mars	"Uptown Funk"	Warner	20 December 2014	7	as featuring
Bruno Mars	"Die with a Smile"	Atlantic/Interscope	23 August 2024	3	Co-credit with Lady Gaga
Bruno Mars	"Apt."	Atlantic	25 October 2024	5	Co-credit with Rosé
Bruno Mars	"I Just Might"	Atlantic	16 January 2026	1	
BTS	"On"	Big Hit	5 March 2020	1	
BTS	"Dynamite"	Big Hit	3 September 2020	1	
BTS	"Life Goes On"	Big Hit	27 November 2020	1	
BTS	"Butter"	Big Hit	28 May 2021	2	
BTS	"My Universe"	Parlophone	1 October 2021	1	
BTS	"Swim"	Big Hit	27 March 2026	4	
BTS	"Come Over"	Big Hit	20 June 2026	1	
BTS	"Normal"	Big Hit	24 July 2026	1	
Busta Rhymes	"Don't Cha"	Universal	14 September 2005	3	as featuring
Artist	Singles	Record label	Reached number one	Weeks at number one	Notes
Calum Scott	"Dancing on My Own"	Universal	28 July 2016	1	
Calum Scott	"Where Are You Now"	Insanity	21 January 2022	2	With Lost Frequencies
Calvin Harris	"Dance wiv Me"	Dirtee Stank	9 July 2008	4	Featured artist
Calvin Harris	"I'm Not Alone"	Sony	15 April 2009	2	
Calvin Harris	"We Found Love"	Universal	9 October 2011	6	Featured artist
Calvin Harris	"Sweet Nothing"	Sony	21 October 2012	1	
Calvin Harris	"Under Control"	Sony	1 December 2013	1	
Calvin Harris	"Summer"	Sony	10 May 2014	1	
Calvin Harris	"Blame"	Sony	20 September 2014	1	
Calvin Harris	"This Is What You Came For"	Sony	12 May 2016	2	
Calvin Harris	"One Kiss"	Sony	26 April 2018	5	
Calvin Harris	"Promises"	Sony	30 August 2018	7	
Calvin Harris	"Giant"	Sony	14 March 2019	7	
Calvin Harris	"Miracle"	Columbia	17 March 2023	2	
Calvin Harris	"Desire"	Columbia	17 March 2023	3	
Calvin Harris	"Blessings"	Columbia	16 May 2025	1	
Camila Cabello	"Havana"	Sony	19 October 2017	5	
Camila Cabello	"Señorita"	Universal	4 July 2019	6	
Camila Cabello	"Bam Bam"	Columbia	1 April 2022	1	
Caroline Redman Lusher	"Keeping the Dream Alive"	Rock	24 December 2020	1	
Carly Rae Jepsen	"Call Me Maybe"	Universal	8 April 2012	4	
Cascada	"Evacuate the Dancefloor"	Universal	8 July 2009	2	
Cassö	"Prada"	Ministry of Sound	29 September 2023	3	
Cee Lo Green (Note: Also featured as part of Gnarls Barkley on the number-one single "Crazy".)	"Forget You"	Warner	13 October 2010	1	
The Chainsmokers	"Closer"	Sony	8 September 2013	3	
Chance the Rapper	"I'm the One"	Universal	11 May 2017	1	as featuring
Charli XCX	"I Love It"	Warner	30 June 2013	1	Featured artist
Charlie Puth	"See You Again"	Warner	25 April 2015	3	as featuring
Charlie Puth	"Marvin Gaye"	Warner	20 August 2015	1	
Chase & Status	"Backbone"	EMI	16 August 2024	1	
The Chemical Brothers	"Galvanize"	EMI	2 February 2005	4	
The Chemical Brothers	"Go	Virgin	8 May 2026	4	
Cher Lloyd (Note: Also featured as part of the 2010 X Factor Finalists on the number-one single "Heroes".)	"Swagger Jagger"	Sony	7 August 2011	1	
Cheryl (Note: Also featured as part of Girls Aloud on the number-one single "The Promise".)	"Fight for This Love"	Universal	28 October 2009	2	
Cheryl	"Promise This"	Universal	3 November 2010	1	
Cheryl	"Call My Name"	Universal	17 June 2012	1	
Chipmunk	"Oopsy Daisy"	Sony	14 October 2009	1	
Chris Brown	"Turn Up the Music"	Sony	1 April 2012	1	
Chris Brown	"Five More Hours"	Warner	27 June 2015	1	
Chris Willis	"Gettin' Over You"	EMI	9 June 2010	1	Co-credit with David Guetta
Christina Aguilera	"Moves Like Jagger"	Universal	4 September 2011	2	Featured artist; as of 9 April 2013, the second most-downloaded single in the UK
Chrome (Note: Also featured on the Dizzee Rascal single "Holiday".)	"Dance wiv Me"	Dirtee Stank	9 July 2008	4	Featured artist
Clean Bandit	"Rather Be"	Warner	26 January 2014	4	
Clean Bandit	"Rockabye"	Warner	17 November 2016	6	
Clean Bandit	"Symphony"	Warner	6 April 2017	3	
Clean Bandit	"Solo"	Warner	28 June 2018	1	
Clementine Douglas	"Blessings"	Columbia	16 May 2025	1	as featuring
Cody Wise	"It's My Birthday"	Universal	19 July 2014	1	Featured artist
Colby O'Donis	"Just Dance"	Warner	9 January 2009	3	Featured artist
Coldplay	"Speed of Sound"	EMI	27 April 2005	3	
Coldplay	"Viva la Vida"	EMI	25 June 2008	2	
Coldplay	"Paradise"	EMI	1 January 2012	1	
Coldplay	"My Universe"	Parlophone	1 October 2021	1	
Coldplay	"We Pray"	Parlophone	30 August 2024	1	Became the 500th number one
The Commonwealth Band	"Sing"	Universal	10 June 2012	1	Featured artist; one-hit wonder
Cookin' on 3 Burners	"This Girl"	3 Beat	23 June 2016	4	
Corinne Bailey Rae	"Put Your Records On"	EMI	1 March 2006	2	
Cover Drive	"Twilight"	Universal	29 January 2012	1	
Craig David	"Really Love"	BMG	5 November 2020	1	as featuring
Creator Universe	"I Wish It Could Be Christmas Everyday"	We Create Popular	22 December 2023	1	2023 Christmas number one
Artist	Singles	Record label	Reached number one	Weeks at number one	Notes
Daddy Yankee	"Despacito"(remix)	Def Jam/RBMG/Republic/UMLE	18 June 2017	11	as featuring
Daft Punk	"Get Lucky"	Sony	28 April 2013	4	
Dalton Harris	"The Power of Love"	Sony	13 December 2018	1	with James Arthur
Dan Caplen	"These Days"	Warner	15 February 2018	6	as featuring
Daniel Merriweather	"Stop Me"	Sony	18 April 2007	1	Featured artist
Daniel Powter	"Bad Day"	Warner	10 August 2005	5	
Dappy	"No Regrets"	Universal	25 September 2011	1	
David Baddiel	"Three Lions"	Sony	19 July 2018	1	
David Guetta	"When Love Takes Over"	EMI	24 June 2009	1	
David Guetta	"Sexy Chick"	EMI	26 August 2009	2	
David Guetta	"Gettin' Over You"	EMI	9 June 2010	1	Co-credit with Chris Willis
David Guetta	"Club Can't Handle Me"	Warner	18 August 2010	1	Featured artist
David Guetta	"Titanium"	EMI	5 February 2012	1	
David Guetta	"Bed"	Asylum/Perfect Havoc	9 April 2021	1	
David Guetta	"I'm Good (Blue)"	Parlophone	9 September 2022	7	
David Zowie	"House Every Weekend"	Universal	16 July 2015	1	one-hit wonder
D-Block Europe	"Prada"	Ministry of Sound	29 September 2023	3	
DCUP	"We No Speak Americano"	Universal	28 July 2010	1	Co-credit with Yolanda Be Cool; one-hit wonder
Demi Lovato	"Solo"	Warner	28 June 2018	1	as featuring
Deorro	"Five More Hours"	Warner	27 June 2015	1	
Dev	"She Makes Me Wanna"	Sony	31 July 2011	1	Featured artist
Diana Vickers	"Once"	Sony	28 April 2010	1	
Diddy	"Nasty Girl"	Warner	25 January 2006	2	Featured artist
Digital Farm Animals	"Really Love"	BMG	5 November 2020	1	
Digital Farm Animals	"Don't Play"	Atlantic	22 January 2021	1	
Dizzee Rascal (Note: Also featured as part of Band Aid 20 on the number-one single "Do They Know It's Christmas?".)	"Dance wiv Me"	Dirtee Stank	9 July 2008	4	
Dizzee Rascal	"Bonkers"	Dirtee Stank	27 May 2009	2	Co-credit with Armand van Helden
Dizzee Rascal	"Holiday"	Dirtee Stank	2 September 2009	1	produced by Calvin Harris
Dizzee Rascal	"You Got the Dirtee Love"	Dirtee Stank/Universal	24 February 2010	1	Co-credit with Florence and the Machine
Dizzee Rascal	"Dirtee Disco"	Dirtee Stank	2 June 2010	1	
Dizzee Rascal	"Shout" [6]	Sony	16 June 2010	2	Featured artist
DJ Fresh	"Louder"	Ministry of Sound	10 July 2011	1	
DJ Fresh	"Hot Right Now"	Ministry of Sound	19 February 2012	1	
DJ Fresh	"Say You Do"	Ministry of Sound	31 March 2016	1	
DJ Khaled	"I'm the One"	Universal	11 May 2017	1	
DJ Mental Theo's Bazzheadz	"Now You're Gone"	Hard2Beat	16 January 2008	3	this featured artist (on Basshunter's number one) is a one-hit wonder
Doechii	"Anxiety"	Capitol	27 March 2025	1	
Drake	"What's My Name?"	Universal	5 January 2011	2	Featured artist
Drake	"One Dance"	Universal	14 April 2016	3	
Drake	"In My Feelings"	Cash Money/Republic	16 August 2018	1	
Dua Lipa	"One Kiss"	Sony	26 April 2018	5	
Dua Lipa	"Cold Heart (Pnau remix)"	EMI	16 September 2021	7	
Duffy	"Mercy"	Universal	20 February 2008	5	
Duke Dumont	"Need U (100%)"	Ministry of Sound	7 April 2013	2	
Duke Dumont	"I Got U"	Blasé Boys Club	23 March 2014	2	
Dvbbs	"Tsunami (Jump)"	Ministry of Sound	16 March 2014	1	
Artist	Singles	Record label	Reached number one	Weeks at number one	Notes
Ed Sheeran	"Sing"	Warner	14 June 2014	1	
Ed Sheeran	"Thinking Out Loud"	Warner	8 November 2014	1	
Ed Sheeran	"Shape of You"	Atlantic	13 January 2017	9	
Ed Sheeran	"How Would You Feel (Paean)"	Atlantic	24 February 2017	1	
Ed Sheeran	"Galway Girl"	Atlantic	24 March 2017	1	
Ed Sheeran	"Perfect"	Atlantic	14 December 2017	6	2017 Christmas number one
Ed Sheeran	"River"	Interscope	25 January 2018	1	with Eminem
Ed Sheeran	"I Don't Care"	Warner	23 May 2019	6	
Ed Sheeran	"Bad Habits"	Asylum	2 July 2021	10	
Ed Sheeran	"Shivers"	Asylum	5 November 2021	2	
Ed Sheeran	"Merry Christmas"	Atlantic	10 December 2021	2	
Ed Sheeran	"Sausage Rolls for Everyone"	FrtyFve	30 December 2020	2	2021 Christmas number one
Ed Sheeran	"The Joker and the Queen"	Asylum	18 February 2022	5	
Ed Sheeran	"Bam Bam"	Asylum	1 April 2022	1	
Ed Sheeran	"Azizam"	Asylum	11 April 2025	2	
Ed Sheeran	"Sapphire"	Asylum	13 June 2025	3	
Ella Eyre	"Waiting All Night"	Warner	21 April 2013	1	Featured artist
Ella Henderson	"Ghost"	Sony	21 June 2014	2	
Ella Henderson	"Glitterball"	Universal	6 August 2015	1	as featuring
Ella Henderson	"Let's Go Home Together"	Atlantic	4 March 2021	2	Duet with Tom Grennan
Ella Langley	"Choosin' Texas"	Columbia	4 September 2026	1	
Ellie Goulding	"Your Song"	Universal	8 December 2010	1	Cover of the Elton John song of the same name.
Ellie Goulding	"Burn"	Universal	18 August 2013	3	
Ellie Goulding	"Love Me Like You Do"	Universal	14 February 2015	4	from the film Fifty Shades of Grey
Ellie Goulding	"Miracle"	Columbia	17 March 2023	2	
Elton John	"Electricity"	Universal	20 July 2005	1	From Billy Elliot the Musical.
Elton John	"Cold Heart (Pnau remix)"	EMI	16 September 2021	7	
Elton John	"Merry Christmas"	Atlantic	10 December 2021	2	
Elton John	"Sausage Rolls for Everyone"	FrtyFve	30 December 2021	2	2021 Christmas number one
Elton John	"Hold Me Closer"	EMI	2 September 2022	1	
Emeli Sandé	"Read All About It"	EMI	30 October 2011	2	Featured artist
Emeli Sandé	"Beneath Your Beautiful"	Sony	28 October 2012	1	Featured artist
Eminem	"The Monster"	Universal	3 November 2013	1	
Eminem	"River"	Interscope	25 January 2018	1	
Eminem	"Houdini"	Interscope	7 June 2024	1	
Eric Turner	"Written in the Stars"	EMI	6 October 2010	1	Featured artist; one-hit wonder
Estelle	"American Boy"	Warner	26 March 2008	4	
Eva Simons	"This Is Love"	Universal	1 July 2012	1	Featured artist
Everton F.C.	"Spirit of the Blues"	13th Moon	8 October 2020	1	
Example	"Changed the Way You Kiss Me"	Ministry of Sound	15 June 2011	2	
Artist	Singles	Record label	Reached number one	Weeks at number one	Notes
Faithless	"New Religion"	Bebe Rexha Music/Empire	20 March 2026	1	
Far East Movement	"Get Up (Rattle)"	Ministry of Sound	27 January 2013	2	Featured artist
Faithless	Fedde le Grand	"Put Your Hands Up 4 Detroit"	Ministry of Sound	8 November 2006	1
Fergie (Note: Also featured as part of The Black Eyed Peas on five number-one singles.)	"Gettin' Over You"	EMI	9 June 2010	1	Featured artist
Flo Rida	"Right Round"	Universal	11 March 2009	2	
Flo Rida	"Bad Boys"	Sony	21 October 2009	1	Featured artist
Flo Rida	"Club Can't Handle Me"	Warner	18 August 2010	1	
Flo Rida	"Good Feeling"	Warner	8 January 2012	1	
Flo Rida	"Troublemaker"	Sony	25 November 2012	3	Featured artist
Florence & The Machine	"You Got the Dirtee Love"	Dirtee Stank/Universal	24 February 2010	1	Co-credit with Dizzee Rascal
Florence & The Machine	"Spectrum"	Universal	22 July 2012	2	
Florence & The Machine	"Sweet Nothing"	Sony	21 October 2012	1	Featured artist
Skinner	"Three Lions"	Sony	19 July 2018	1	
Fred Again	"Adore U"	Atlantic	22 September 2023	1	
fun.	"We Are Young"	Warner	27 May 2012	1	
Artist	Singles	Record label	Reached number one	Weeks at number one	Notes
Gaeko	"Neuron"	Big Hit	5 April 2024	1	
Gareth Malone	"Wherever You Are" †	Universal	25 December 2011	1	Featured artist; 2011 Christmas number one
Gareth Malone	"Wake Me Up"	Universal	22 November 2014	1	
Gary Barlow (Note: Also featured as part of Take That on the number-one singles "Patience" and "Greatest Day".)	"Sing"	Universal	10 June 2012	1	
Gayle	"ABCDEFU"	Atlantic	7 January 2022	2	
George Ezra	"Paradise"	Sony	29 March 2018	2	
George Ezra	"Shotgun"	Sony	5 July 2018	6	
Girls Aloud	"The Promise"	Universal	29 October 2008	1	
Gnarls Barkley	"Crazy"	Warner	22 March 2006	11	As of 28 July 2013, most ever weeks at number one for a single
GoonRock	"Party Rock Anthem"	Universal	20 April 2011	4	Featured artist; one-hit wonder
GloRilla	"Killin' It Girl"	Big Hit	26 June 2025	1	
Gorillaz	"Feel Good Inc."	EMI	1 June 2005	3	
Gotye	"Somebody That I Used to Know"	Universal	12 February 2012	5	One-hit wonder; as of 9 April 2013, the third most-downloaded single in the UK
Green Day	"Boulevard of Broken Dreams"	Warner	26 January 2005	1	
Gwen Stefani	"What You Waiting For"	Universal	12 January 2005	2	
Gym Class Heroes	"Cupid's Chokehold"	Warner	16 May 2007	1	
Artist	Singles	Record label	Reached number one	Weeks at number one	Notes
Halsey	"Closer"	Sony	8 September 2013	3	as featuring
Harry Styles	"Sign of the Times"	Sony	20 April 2017	1	
Harry Styles	"As It Was"	Columbia	8 April 2022	3	
Harry Styles	"Aperture"	Columbia	30 January 2026	1	
Harry Styles	"American Girls"	Columbia	13 March 2026	1	
Hayley Williams	"Airplanes"	Warner	28 July 2010	1	Featured artist
Helping Haiti	"Everybody Hurts"	Sony	17 February 2010	1	Multiple-artist ensemble; one-hit wonder
The Hoosiers	"Route 66"	FrtyFve	18 June 2021	1	
Hozier	"Too Sweet"	Island	26 April 2024	2	
Hugel	"Movin' to the Sun"	Make the Girls Dance	26 June 2026	10	
Huntrix	"Golden"	Republic	14 August 2025	8	
Artist	Singles	Record labels	Reached number one	Weeks at number one	Notes
Icona Pop	"I Love It"	Warner	30 June 2013	1	
Imael Angel	"Movin' to the Sun"	Make the Girls Dance	26 June 2026	10	
Iyaz	"Replay"	Warner	13 January 2010	2	
Artist	Singles	Record labels	Reached number one	Weeks at number one	Notes
J-Hope	"Neuron"	Big Hit	5 April 2024	1	
J-Hope	"Sweet Dreams"	Big Hit	14 March 2025	1	
J-Hope	"Mona Lisa"	Big Hit	3 April 2025	1	
J-Hope	"Killin' It Girl"	Big Hit	26 June 2025	1	
Jack Harlow	"3D"	Big Hit	6 October 2023	1	as featuring
Jack Harlow	"Lovin on Me"	Atlantic	24 November 2023	2	
Jagged Edge	"Nasty Girl"	Warner	25 January 2006	2	as featuring
James Arthur	"Impossible"	Sony	16 December 2012	2	
James Arthur	"Say You Won't Let Go"	Sony	29 September 2016	4	
James Arthur	"The Power of Love"	Sony	13 December 2018	1	with Dalton Harris
James Arthur	"Lasting Lover"	Ministry of Sound	1 October 2020	1	as featuring
James Blunt	"You're Beautiful"	Warner	22 June 2005	5	
James Corden	"Shout"	Sony	16 June 2010	2	Featured artist; one-hit wonder
James Marriott	"I Don't Want to Live Like This"	Independent	7 February 2025	1	one-hit wonder
Jamie Lawson	"Wasn't Expecting That"	Warner	22 October 2015	1	one-hit wonder
Jamie Miller	"Babydoll"	Republic	16 October 2026	5	
Janelle Monáe	"We Are Young"	Warner	27 May 2012	1	Featured artist; one-hit wonder
Jason Derulo	"Whatcha Say"	Warner	2 December 2009	1	
Jason Derulo	"In My Head"	Warner	3 March 2010	1	
Jason Derulo	"Don't Wanna Go Home"	Warner	26 June 2011	2	
Jason Derulo	"Talk Dirty"	Warner	22 September 2013	2	
Jason Derulo	"Want to Want Me"	Warner	6 June 2015	3	
Jason Derulo	"Savage Love (Laxed – Siren Beat)"	RCA	2 July 2020	4	produced by Jawsh 685
Jax Jones	"I Got U"	Blasé Boys Club	23 March 2014	2	as featuring with Duke Dumont
Jax Jones	"Where Did You Go?"	Polydor	25 March 2022	1	
Jay-Z	"Umbrella"	Universal	23 May 2007	8	Featured artist
Jay-Z	"Run This Town"	Sony	9 September 2009	1	
Jennie	"You & Me"	Interscope	13 October 2023	1	
Jennifer Lopez	"On the Floor"	Universal	6 April 2011	2	
Jess Glynne	"Rather Be"	Warner	26 January 2014	4	Featured artist
Jess Glynne	"My Love"	Rinse	9 March 2014	1	
Jess Glynne	"Hold My Hand"	Warner	4 April 2015	2	
Jess Glynne	"Not Letting Go"	Parlophone	25 April 2015	3	with Tinie Tempah
Jess Glynne	"Don't Be So Hard on Yourself"	Warner	27 August 2015	1	
Jess Glynne	"These Days"	Warner	14 February 2018	6	as featuring
Jess Glynne	"I'll Be There"	Warner	2 June 2018	2	
Jessie J	"Price Tag"	Universal	9 February 2011	2	
Jessie J	"Domino"	Universal	15 January 2012	1	
Jessie J	"Bang Bang"	Universal	4 November 2014	2	with Ariana Grande & Nicki Minaj
Jimin	"Set Me Free Pt. 2"	Big Hit	24 March 2023	1	
Jimin	"Like Crazy"	Big Hit	31 March 2023	2	
Jimin	"Smeraldo Garden Marching Band"	Big Hit	5 June 2024	1	
Jimin	"Who"	Big Hit	26 July 2024	3	
Jin	"I'll Be There"	Big Hit	1 November 2024	1	
Jin	"Running Wild"	Big Hit	22 November 2024	1	
Jin	"Don't Say You Love Me"	Big Hit	23 May 2025	1	
JLS	"Beat Again"	Sony	22 July 2009	2	
JLS	"Everybody in Love"	Sony	11 November 2009	1	
JLS	"The Club Is Alive"	Sony	14 July 2010	1	
JLS	"Love You More"	Sony	24 November 2010	1	
JLS	"She Makes Me Wanna"	Sony	31 July 2011	1	
Jodie Connor	"Good Times"	EMI	12 May 2010	2	Featured artist
Joel Corry	"Head & Heart"	Asylum/Perfect Havoc	30 July 2020	5	
Joel Corry	"Bed"	Asylum/Perfect Havoc	9 April 2021	1	
Joel Corry	"Lionheart (Fearless)"	Atlantic	8 December 2022	1	
John Legend	"Lay Me Down"	Universal	21 March 2015	2	with Sam Smith
John Martin	"Don't You Worry Child"	Universal	14 October 2012	1	Featured artist
John Newman	"Feel the Love"	Warner	3 June 2012	1	Featured artist
John Newman	"Love Me Again"	Universal	7 July 2013	1	
John Newman	"Blame"	Universal	20 September 2014	1	
Jonas Blue	"Fast Car"	Universal	4 February 2016	1	
Jonas Blue	"Perfect Strangers"	Universal	21 July 2016	1	
Josh Kumra	"Don't Go"	Ministry of Sound	21 August 2011	1	Featured artist; one-hit wonder
Joss Stone	"Golden"	ITV Studios	18 November 2023	1	
JP Cooper	"Perfect Strangers"	Universal	21 July 2016	1	As featuring
Jungkook	"Seven"	Big Hit	21 July 2023	1	
Jungkook	"3D"	Big Hit	6 October 2023	1	
Jungkook	"Standing Next to You"	Big Hit	10 November 2023	1	
Jungkook	"Never Let Go"	Big Hit	14 June 2024	1	
The Justice Collective	"He Ain't Heavy, He's My Brother" †	Metropolis	23 December 2012	1	Multiple-artist ensemble; one-hit wonder; 2012 Christmas number one
Justin Bieber	"What Do You Mean?"	Universal	10 September 2015	2	
Justin Bieber	"Love Yourself"	Universal	10 December 2015	5	
Justin Bieber	"Cold Water"	Because Music	5 August 2016	2	Featured Artist
Justin Bieber	"Let Me Love You"	Universal	19 August 2016	3	Featured artist
Justin Bieber	"I'm the One"	Universal	11 May 2017	1	Featured artist
Justin Bieber	"Despacito Remix"	Universal	18 May 2017	11	Featured artist
Justin Bieber	"I Don't Care"	Warner	23 May 2017	5	with Ed Sheeran
Justin Timberlake	"SexyBack"	Sony	9 August 2006	1	
Justin Timberlake	"4 Minutes"	Warner	23 April 2008	4	Featured artist
Justin Timberlake	"Mirrors"	Sony	3 March 2013	3	
Justin Timberlake	"Can't Stop the Feeling!"	Sony	26 May 2016	4	from the film Trolls
Artist	Singles	Record label	Reached number one	Weeks at number one	Notes
Kaiser Chiefs	"Ruby"	Universal	28 February 2007	3	
Kanye West	"Stronger"	Universal	15 August 2007	2	
Kanye West	"American Boy"	Warner	26 March 2008	4	Featured artist
Kanye West	"Run This Town"	Sony	9 September 2009	1	Featured artist
Kate Bush	"Running Up That Hill"	Fish People	10 June 2022	3	
Kate Nash	"Foundations"	Universal	25 July 2007	2	
Katy B	"Turn the Music Louder (Rumble)"	Ministry of Sound	29 October 2015	1	as featuring
Katy Perry	"I Kissed a Girl"	EMI	13 August 2008	5	
Katy Perry	"California Gurls"	EMI	30 June 2010	2	
Katy Perry	"Part of Me"	EMI	25 March 2012	1	
Katy Perry	"Roar"	Universal	8 September 2013	2	
KDA	"Turn the Music Louder (Rumble)"	Ministry of Sound	29 October 2015	1	
Keala Settle	"This Is Me"	Warner	12 April 2018	1	
Kelly Clarkson	"My Life Would Suck Without You"	Sony	4 March 2009	1	
Kelly Rowland	"When Love Takes Over"	EMI	24 June 2009	1	Featured artist
Keri Hilson	"The Way I Are"	Universal	18 July 2007	2	Featured artist
Kesha	"Right Round"	Universal	11 March 2009	2	Featured artist
Kesha	"We R Who We R"	Sony	2 February 2011	1	
Kesha	"Timber"	Sony	5 January 2014	1	Featured artist
Kid Rock	"All Summer Long"	Warner	6 August 2008	1	One-hit wonder
Kiesza	"Hideaway"	Universal	20 April 2014	1	
Kimbra	"Somebody That I Used to Know"	Universal	12 February 2012	5	Featured artist; one-hit wonder; as of 9 April 2013, the third most-downloaded single in the UK
Kings of Leon	"Sex on Fire"	Sony	17 September 2008	3	The second most-downloaded single of the 2000s
Kirsty MacColl	"Fairytale of New York"	Pogue Malone	8 December 2023	1	with The Pogues
KSI	"Lighter"	Atlantic	6 August 2020	1	as featuring
KSI	"Really Love"	BMG	5 November 2020	1	
KSI	"Don't Play"	Atlantic	22 January 2021	1	
KSI	"Patience"	BMG/Interscope	26 March 2021	1	
KSI	"Holiday"	BMG	1 July 2021	1	
KSI	"Not Over Yet"	Atlantic	12 August 2022	1	
The Krackpots	"Proper Christmas"	Official Kulture	15 December 2023	1	
Kungs	"This Girl"	3 Beat	23 June 2016	4	
The Kunts	"Prince Andrew Is a Sweaty Nonce"	Radical Rudeness	3 June 2022	1	
The Krown Jewelz	"Scrap the Monarchy"	Pegging Prince	3 June 2022	1	
Kygo	"Higher Love"	Sony/Kygo	22 August 2019	5	
Kylie Minogue	"Padam Padam"	BMG	26 May 2023	7	
Kylie Minogue	"Tension"	BMG	8 September 2023	1	
Kylie Minogue	"Lights Camera Action"	BMG	4 October 2024	1	
Kylie Minogue	"Love Sensation"	Warner	14 August 2026	1	with Madonna
Artist	Singles	Record label	Reached number one	Weeks at number one	Notes
La Roux	"Bulletproof"	EMI	1 July 2009	1	
Labrinth	"Beneath Your Beautiful"	Sony	28 October 2012	1	
LadBaby	"We Built This City"	FrtyFve	27 December 2018	3	2018 Christmas number one
LadBaby	"I Love Sausage Rolls"	FrtyFve	26 December 2019	1	2019 Christmas number one
LadBaby	"Don't Stop Me Eatin'"	FrtyFve	31 December 2020	1	2020 Christmas number one
LadBaby	"Sausage Rolls for Everyone"	FrtyFve	30 December 2021	2	2021 Christmas number one
LadBaby	"Food Aid"	BMG	23 December 2022	1	2022 Christmas number one
Lady Gaga	"Just Dance"	Warner	14 January 2009	3	The third most-downloaded single of the 2000s
Lady Gaga	"Poker Face"	Warner	25 March 2009	3	The most-downloaded single of the 2000s
Lady Gaga	"Bad Romance"	Warner	16 December 2009	2	
Lady Gaga	"Telephone"	Universal	31 March 2010	1	
Lady Gaga	"Shallow"	Universal	18 October 2018	4	
Lady Gaga	"Stupid Love"	Interscope	12 March 2020	1	
Lady Gaga	"Rain on Me"	Universal	29 May 2020	4	Co-credit with Ariana Grande
Lady Gaga	"Die with a Smile"	Atlantic/Interscope	23 August 2024	3	Co-credit with Bruno Mars
Lana Del Rey	"Don't Call Me Angel"	Universal	20 September 2019	1	Co-credit with Miley Cyrus and Ariana Grande
Latto	"Seven"	Big Hit	21 July 2023	1	as featuring
Lauren Bennett	"Party Rock Anthem"	Universal	20 April 2011	4	Featured artist; one-hit wonder
Laza Morgan	"Start Without You"	Sony	15 September 2010	2	Featured artist; one-hit wonder
Leo Sayer	"Thunder in My Heart Again"	Universal	15 February 2006	2	Featured artist; one-hit wonder
Leon Jackson	"When You Believe"	Sony	26 December 2007	2	Cover of the Whitney Houston/Mariah Carey duet of the same name.
Leona Lewis	"A Moment Like This"	Sony	27 December 2006	2	Cover of the Kelly Clarkson song and was her winner's single when she won American Idol.
Leona Lewis	"Bleeding Love"	Sony	31 October 2007	7	
Leona Lewis	"Run"	Sony	10 December 2008	2	
Lewis Capaldi	"Someone You Loved"	Universal	11 April 2019	4	
Lewis Capaldi	"Hold Me While You Wait"	Universal	16 June 2019	1	
Lewis Capaldi	"Before You Go"	Universal	9 January 2020	1	
Lewis Capaldi	"Forget Me"	Vertigo	16 September 2022	1	
Lewis Capaldi	"Pointless"	Vertigo	9 December 2022	3	
Lewis Capaldi	"Wish You the Best"	Vertigo	21 April 2023	3	
Lewis Capaldi	"Survive"	Polydor	4 July 2025	2	
Lewis Capaldi	"Something in the Heavens"	Polydor	26 September 2025	2	
Lewisham and Greenwich NHS Choir	"A Bridge over You"	Emu Bands	31 December 2015	1	2015 Christmas number one
LF System	"Afraid to Feel"	Warner	1 July 2022	7	
Liam Gallagher	"All You're Dreaming Of"	Warner	4 December 2020	1	
Liam Gallagher	"Everything's Electric"	Warner	11 February 2022	1	
The Lightning Seeds	"Three Lions"	Sony	19 July 2018	1	
Lil Nas X	"Old Town Road"	Lil Nas X	11 July 2019	1	
Lily Allen	"The Fear"	EMI	4 February 2009	4	
Lilly Wood	"Prayer in C"	Warner	6 September 2014	1	
Linkin Park	"The Emptiness Machine"	Warner	13 September 2024	1	
Lisa	"Moonlit Floor"	RCA	13 October 2024	1	
Little Mix (Note: Also featured as part of the 2011 X Factor Finalists on the number-one single "Wishing on a Star".)	"Cannonball"	Sony	18 December 2011	1	Cover of the Damien Rice song.
Little Mix	"Wings"	Sony	2 September 2012	1	
Little Mix	"Black Magic"	Sony	23 July 2015	2	
Little Mix	"Shout Out to My Ex"	Sony	27 October 2016	3	
Little Mix	"Sweet Melody"	RCA	8 January 2021	1	
Little Mix	"Confetti"	RCA	13 May 2021	1	First Release since departure of Jesy Nelson
Live Lounge Allstars	"Times Like These"	BBC/Columbia	7 May 2020	2	Response to COVID-19 pandemic in aid of Children in Need and Comic Relief.
Lizzo	"About Damn Time"	Atlantic	13 May 2022	1	
LMFAO	"Gettin' Over You"	EMI	9 June 2010	1	Featured artist
LMFAO	"Party Rock Anthem"	Universal	20 April 2011	4	
Loco	"Smeraldo Garden Marching Band"	Big Hit	5 June 2024	1	as featuring
Lola Young	"Messy"	Island	30 January 2025	6	
Lorde	"Royals"	Universal	27 October 2013	1	
Loreen	"Tattoo"	UMG International	19 May 2023	1	
Lost Frequencies	"Are You with Me"	Universal	9 July 2015	1	
Lost Frequencies	"Where Are You Now"	Insanity	21 January 2022	2	
Luis Fonsi	"Despacito"(remix)	Def Jam/RBMG/Republic/UMLE	18 June 2017	11	
Lukas Graham	"7 Years"	Warner	18 February 2016	5	
LunchMoney Lewis	"Bills"	Sony	23 May 2015	1	
Artist	Singles	Record label	Reached number one	Weeks at number one	Notes
Macklemore	"Thrift Shop"	Macklemore	10 February 2013	1	
Macklemore	"These Days"	Warner	15 February 2018	6	
Madonna	"Hung Up"	Warner	2 November 2005	7	
Madonna	"4 Minutes"	Warner	23 April 2008	4	
Madonna	"Love Sensation"	Warner	14 August 2026	1	
Magic!	"Rude"	Sony	9 August 2014	1	
Mariah Carey	"All I Want for Christmas Is You" †	Sony	19 December 2007	1	2007 Christmas number one
Maroon 5	"Moves Like Jagger"	Universal	4 September 2011	2	As of 9 April 2013, the second most-downloaded single in the UK
Maroon 5	"Payphone"	Universal	24 June 2012	3	
Mark Ronson	"Stop Me"	Sony	18 April 2007	1	
Mark Ronson	"Uptown Funk"	Sony	20 December 2014	7	
Mark Ronson	"Nothing Breaks Like a Heart"	Sony	20 December 2018	1	
Martin Garrix	"Animals"	Universal	17 November 2013	1	
Marti Pellow	"Love Is All Around"	ITV Studios	24 October 2024	1	
Matt Cardle	"When We Collide" †	Sony	22 December 2010	2	2010 Christmas number one
Matt Lucas	"Thank You Baked Potato"	Loudmouth	16 April 2020	1	
Matt Terry	"When Christmas Comes Around"	Sony	22 December 2016	1	
McFly	"All About You"	Universal	16 March 2005	2	
McFly	"Star Girl" [2]	Universal	1 November 2006	1	
Meat Loaf	"Bat Out of Hell"	Epic	28 January 2022	1	
Meck	"Thunder in My Heart Again"	Universal	15 February 2006	2	
Meghan Trainor	"All About That Bass"	Sony	11 October 2014	4	
Meghan Trainor	"Marvin Gaye"	Warner	20 August 2015	1	
Meghan Trainor	"Made You Look"	Epic	25 November 2022	2	
Mental As Anything	"Live It Up"	Crimson	17 December 2020	1	
Michael Ball, Captain Tom and The NHS Voices of Care Choir	"You'll Never Walk Alone"	Decca	30 April 2020	1	Charity record in aid of NHS Charities Together during the COVID-19 pandemic.
Miguel	"Sweet Dreams"	Big Hit	20 March 2025	1	as featuring
Mike Posner	"I Took a Pill in Ibiza"	Warner	24 March 2016	3	
Miley Cyrus	"We Can't Stop"	Sony	11 August 2013	1	
Miley Cyrus	"Wrecking Ball"	Sony	13 October 2013	1	
Miley Cyrus	"Nothing Breaks Like a Heart"	Sony	20 December 2018	1	
Miley Cyrus	"Don't Call Me Angel"	Universal	20 September 2019	1	Co-credit with Ariana Grande and Lana Del Rey
Miley Cyrus	"Midnight Sky"	RCA	17 September 2020	4	
Miley Cyrus	"Flowers"	Columbia	20 January 2023	8	
Miley Cyrus	"Used to Be Young"	Columbia	1 September 2023	1	
Military Wives	"Wherever You Are" †	Universal	25 December 2011	1	2011 Christmas number one
Mika	"Grace Kelly"	Universal	17 January 2007	6	
Mint Royale	"Singin' in the Rain"	Sony	11 June 2008	2	One-hit wonder
MNEK	"Head & Heart"	Asylum/Perfect Havoc	30 July 2020	5	as featuring
MNEK	"Where Did You Go?"	Polydor	25 March 2022	1	
MØ	"Cold Water"	Universal	5 August 2016	2	as featuring
Mouldy Lookin' Stain	"Dogz Don't Kill People Wabbits Do"	Warner	27 October 2004	1	One-hit wonder
Mr Probz	"Waves"	Left Lane	3 May 2014	2	
Ms D (Note: Also featured on the Chipmunk single "Oopsy Daisy".)	"Heatwave"	Warner	5 August 2012	2	
Mufasa & Hypeman	"Friday"	Ministry of Sound	23 April 2021	1	
Myles Smith	"Nice to Meet You"	Sony Music	17 January 2025	1	
Artist	Singles	Record label	Reached number one	Weeks at number one	Notes
Natasha Bedingfield	"These Words"	Sony	8 September 2004	4	
Nathan Dawe	"Lighter"	Atlantic	6 August 2020	1	
Nathan Evans	"Wellerman"	Polydor	29 January 2021	6	
Naughty Boy	"La La La"	Universal	26 May 2013	1	
Nayer	"Give Me Everything"	Sony	22 May 2011	3	Featured artist; one-hit wonder
N-Dubz	"Number 1"	Universal	29 April 2009	3	Featured artist
Nelly	"Nasty Girl"	Warner	25 January 2006	2	Featured artist
Nelly Furtado	"Maneater"	Universal	14 June 2006	4	
Nero	"Promises"	MTA	14 August 2011	1	
Ne-Yo	"Beautiful Monster"	Universal	8 August 2010	1	
Ne-Yo	"Give Me Everything"	Sony	22 May 2011	3	Featured artist
Ne-Yo	"Let Me Love You (Until You Learn to Love Yourself)"	Universal	9 September 2012	1	
Niall Horan	"Our Song"	Atlantic	17 June 2021	1	
Niall Horan	"Everywhere"	Atlantic	2 December 2021	1	
Nickelback	"Rockstar"	Warner	13 February 2008	1	
Nick Jonas	"Jealous"	Warner	18 April 2015	1	
Nicki Minaj	"Bang Bang"	Universal	4 November 2014	2	with Ariana Grande & Jessie J
Nicky Romero	"I Could Be the One"	Universal	17 February 2013	1	Co-credit with Avicii
Nico & Vinz	"Am I Wrong"	Universal	16 August 2014	2	
Nicole Scherzinger (Note: Also featured as part of the Pussycat Dolls on the number-one single "Don't Cha".)	"Don't Hold Your Breath"	Universal	20 March 2011	1	
Nightcrawlers	"Friday"	Ministry of Sound	23 April 2021	1	
Nizlopi	"JCB" †	FDM	21 December 2005	3	One-hit wonder; 2005 Christmas number one
Noah Kahan	"Stick Season"	Republic	5 January 2024	1	
Normani	"Dancing with a Stranger"	Universal	7 February 2019	1	with Sam Smith
The Notorious B.I.G.	"Nasty Girl"	Warner	25 January 2006	2	One-hit wonder
Artist	Singles	Record label	Reached number one	Weeks at number one	Notes
Oliver Anthony	"Rich Men North of Richmond"	DistroKid	15 January 2021	1	
Oliver Heldens	"Gecko (Overdrive)"	Universal	5 July 2014	1	
Olivia Dean	"Rein Me In"	Polydor	27 February 2026	3	
Olivia Rodrigo	"Drivers License"	Interscope	15 January 2021	1	
Olivia Rodrigo	"Drop Dead"	Geffen	24 April 2026	1	
Olly Murs (Note: Also featured as part of the 2009 X Factor Finalists on the number-one single "You Are Not Alone".)	"Please Don't Let Me Go"	Sony	5 September 2010	1	
Olly Murs	"Heart Skips a Beat"	Sony	28 August 2011	1	
Olly Murs	"Dance with Me Tonight"	Sony	11 December 2011	1	
Olly Murs	"Troublemaker"	Sony	25 November 2012	3	
OMI	"Cheerleader"	Sony	16 May 2015	2	
One Direction	"What Makes You Beautiful"	Sony	18 September 2011	1	
One Direction	"Little Things"	Sony	18 November 2012	1	
One Direction	"One Way or Another (Teenage Kicks)"	Sony	24 February 2013	1	Mash up of the Blondie song and The Undertones song of the same name.
One Direction	"Story of My Life"	Sony	8 December 2013	1	
One Direction	"Drag Me Down"	Sony	13 August 2015	1	
OneRepublic	"Apologize"	Universal	9 January 2008	1	Co-credit with Timbaland
OneRepublic	"Counting Stars"	Universal	6 October 2013	2	
The Ordinary Boys	"Boys Will Be Boys"	Warner	8 February 2006	1	
Orson	"No Tomorrow"	Universal	15 March 2006	1	
Owl City	"Fireflies"	Universal	27 January 2010	3	
Artist	Singles	Record label	Reached number one	Weeks at number one	Notes
Paloma Faith	"Changing"	Universal	27 September 2014	1	
Park Hyo-shin	"Winter Ahead"	Big Hit	6 December 2024	1	
Paul Harvey	"Four Notes – Paul's Tune"	Redrocca	6 November 2020	2	
Paul McCartney	"Sgt. Pepper's Lonely Hearts Club Band"	Universal	13 July 2005	1	Co-credit with U2
Perrie	"Forget About Us"	Columbia	19 April 2024	1	
Peter Kay	"Is This the Way to Amarillo"	Universal	30 March 2005	4	Featured artist
Peter Kay	"I'm Gonna Be (500 Miles)"	EMI	21 March 2007	3	Featured artist; credited as Brian Potter
Pharrell Williams	"Get Lucky"	Sony	28 April 2013	4	Featured artist
Pharrell Williams	"Blurred Lines"	Universal	2 June 2013	5	Featured artist
Pharrell Williams	"Happy"	Sony	29 December 2013	4	
Philip George	"Alone No More"	3 Beat	15 October 2015	1	
Pink	"So What"	Sony	8 October 2008	3	
Pink	"What About Us"	Sony	24 August 2017	2	
Pink	"A Million Dreams"	Sony	29 November 2018	1	
Pink	"Walk Me Home"	Sony	7 March 2019	1	
Pink	"Anywhere Away from Here"	Columbia	16 April 2021	4	With Rag'n'Bone Man
Pink Floyd	"Hey, Hey, Rise Up!"	Rhino	15 April 2022	1	
Pitbull	"On the Floor"	Universal	3 April 2011	2	Featured artist
Pitbull	"Give Me Everything"	Sony	22 May 2011	3	
Pitbull	"Timber"	Sony	5 January 2014	1	
Pixie Lott	"Mama Do (Uh Oh, Uh Oh)"	Universal	17 June 2009	1	
Pixie Lott	"All About Tonight"	Universal	11 September 2011	1	
PJ & Duncan	"Let's Get Ready to Rhumble"	Demon	31 March 2013	1	One-hit wonder
Plain White T's	"Hey There Delilah"	EMI	12 September 2007	1	
The Pogues	"Fairytale of New York"	Pogue Malone	8 December 2023	1	
Polo G	"Patience"	BMG/Interscope	26 March 2021	1	
The Proclaimers	"I'm Gonna Be (500 Miles)"	EMI	21 March 2007	3	One-hit wonder
Professor Green	"Read All About It"	EMI	30 October 2011	2	
Psy	"Gangnam Style"	Universal	30 September 2012	1	
Pussycat Dolls	"Don't Cha"	Universal	14 September 2005	3	
Artist	Singles	Record label	Reached number one	Weeks at number one	Notes
Quavo	"I'm the One"	Universal	11 May 2017	1	as featuring
Artist	Singles	Record label	Reached number one	Weeks at number one	Notes
Rachel Platten	"Fight Song"	Sony	3 September 2015	1	One-hit wonder
Rag'n'Bone Man	"Human"	Sony	29 December 2016	2	2016 Christmas number one
Rag'n'Bone Man	"Giant"	Warner	14 February 2019	3	
Rag'n'Bone Man	"All You Ever Wanted"	Best Laid Plans/Columbia	5 March 2021	1	
Rag'n'Bone Man	"Anywhere Away from Here"	Best Laid Plans/Columbia	16 April 2021	4	
Rage Against the Machine	"Killing in the Name" †	Sony	23 December 2009	2	One-hit wonder; 2009 Christmas number one
Raye	"Bed"	Asylum/Perfect Havoc	9 April 2021	1	
Raye	"Prada"	Ministry of Sound	29 September 2023	3	
Raye	"Where Is My Husband!"	Human Re Sources	3 October 2025	4	
Razorlight	"America"	Universal	11 October 2006	3	
Regard	"Ride It"	Ministry of Sound	27 September 2019	1	
Rihanna	"Umbrella"	Universal	23 May 2007	8	
Rihanna	"Take a Bow"	Universal	21 May 2008	2	
Rihanna	"Live Your Life" [3]	Warner	19 November 2008	1	Featured artist
Rihanna	"Run This Town" [4]	Sony	9 September 2009	1	Featured artist
Rihanna	"Russian Roulette" [5]	Universal	9 December 2009	1	
Rihanna	"Only Girl (In the World)"	Universal	10 November 2010	2	
Rihanna	"What's My Name?" [7]	Universal	5 January 2011	2	
Rihanna	"We Found Love" [8]	Universal	9 October 2011	6	
Rihanna	"Diamonds" [9]	Universal	7 October 2012	1	
Rihanna	"The Monster" [10]	Universal	3 November 2013	1	Featured artist
Rihanna	"This Is What You Came For" [11]	Sony	12 May 2016	2	Featured artist
Rihanna	"Lift Me Up" [12]	Def Jam	4 November 2022	1	
Rita Ora	"Hot Right Now"	Ministry of Sound	19 February 2012	1	Featured artist
Rita Ora	"R.I.P."	Sony	13 May 2012	2	
Rita Ora	"How We Do (Party)"	Sony	19 August 2012	1	
Rita Ora	"I Will Never Let You Down"	Universal	24 May 2014	1	
Rita Ora	"Anywhere"	Sony	23 November 2017	3	
Riton	"Friday"	Ministry of Sound	23 April 2021	1	
Rixton	"Me and My Broken Heart"	Sony	26 July 2014	1	
Rizzle Kicks	"Heart Skips a Beat"	Sony	28 August 2011	1	Featured artist
RM	"Come Back to Me"	Big Hit	17 May 2024	1	
RM	"Lost"	Big Hit	31 May 2024	1	
Robbie Williams	"Candy"	Universal	4 November 2012	2	
Robin Schulz	"Prayer in C"	Warner	6 September 2014	1	
Robin Thicke	"Blurred Lines"	Universal	2 June 2013	5	
Rock Choir	"Keeping the Dream Alive"	Rock	24 December 2020	1	
Roll Deep	"Good Times"	EMI	9 May 2010	2	
Roll Deep	"Green Light"	EMI	22 August 2010	1	
Rosé	"Apt."	Atlantic	25 October 2024	5	
Route 94	"My Love"	Rinse	9 March 2014	1	One-hit wonder
RSPB	"Let Nature Sing"	The RSPB	9 May 2019	1	In aid of Royal Society for the Protection of Birds.
Rudimental	"Feel the Love"	Warner	3 June 2012	1	
Rudimental	"Waiting All Night"	Warner	21 April 2013	1	
Rudimental	"These Days"	Warner	15 February 2018	6	
Ruti Olajugbagbe	"Dreams"	Universal	19 April 2018	1	
Ryan Lewis	"Thrift Shop"	Macklemore	10 February 2013	1	Featured artist
Artist	Singles	Record label	Reached number one	Weeks at number one	Notes
Sam Bailey	"Skyscraper"	Sony	22 December 2013	1	2013 Christmas number one
Sam Clegg	"Send Me a Sign"	Sam Clegg Music	30 November 2024	1	
Sam Fender	"Rein Me In"	Polydor	27 February 2026	3	
Sam Martin	"Lovers on the Sun"	Warner	30 August 2014	1	as featuring
Sam Ryder	"Space Man"	Parlophone	20 May 2022	2	
Sam Ryder	"You're Christmas To Me"	East West/Rhino	4 January 2024	1	
Sam Smith	"La La La"	Universal	26 May 2013	1	Featured artist
Sam Smith	"Money on My Mind"	Universal	23 February 2014	1	
Sam Smith	"Stay With Me"	Universal	31 May 2014	1	
Sam Smith	"Lay Me Down"	Universal	21 March 2015	2	
Sam Smith	"Too Good at Goodbyes"	Universal	21 September 2017	4	
Sam Smith	"Promises"	Universal	30 August 2018	7	with Calvin Harris
Sam Smith	"Dancing with a Stranger"	Universal	7 February 2019	1	with Normani
Sam Smith	"Desire"	Columbia	4 August 2023	3	with Calvin Harris
Sam and the Womp	"Bom Bom"	Stiff	26 August 2012	1	One-hit wonder
Sandi Thom	"I Wish I Was a Punk Rocker (With Flowers in My Hair)"	Sony	7 June 2006	1	
The Saturdays	"What About Us"	Universal	24 March 2013	1	
Scissor Sisters	"I Don't Feel Like Dancin'"	Universal	23 August 2006	7	
Scouting for Girls	"This Ain't a Love Song"	Sony	4 April 2010	2	
The Script	"Hall of Fame"	Sony	16 September 2012	2	
The Script	"Superheroes"	Sony	13 September 2014	1	
Sean Kingston	"Beautiful Girls"	Sony	29 August 2007	2	
Sean Paul	"What About Us"	Universal	24 March 2013	1	Featured artist
Secondcity	"I Wanna Feel"	Ministry of Sound	7 June 2014	1	
Shaboozey	"A Bar Song (Tipsy)"	Dogwood/Empire	25 May 2024	5	
Shakira	"Hips Don't Lie"	Sony	12 July 2006	5	
Shakira	"Beautiful Liar"	Sony	25 April 2007	3	Co-credit with Beyoncé
Shayne Ward	"That's My Goal"	Sony	28 December 2005	2	
Shawn Mendes	"Stitches"	Warner	21 January 2016	2	
Shawn Mendes	"Señorita"	Universal	4 July 2019	6	
Shout For England	"Shout"	Sony	13 June 2010	2	Multiple-artist ensemble; one-hit wonder
Sia	"Titanium"	EMI	5 February 2012	1	Featured artist
Sian Evans	"Louder"	Ministry of Sound	10 July 2011	1	Featured artist
The Sidemen	"Christmas Drillings"	The Sidemen	30 December 2022	1	
Sigala	"Easy Love"	Ministry of Sound	17 September 2015	1	
Sigala	"Say You Do"	Ministry of Sound	31 March 2016	1	
Sigala	"Lasting Lover"	Ministry of Sound	1 November 2020	1	
Sigma	"Nobody to Love"	Universal	13 April 2014	1	
Sigma	"Changing"	Universal	27 September 2014	1	
Sigma	"Glitterball"	Universal	6 August 2015	1	
Sigrid	"Strangers"	Universal	1 February 2018}	2	
Sinéad O'Connor	"Nothing Compares 2 U"	Chrysalis	28 July 2023}	1	
Snoop Dogg	"California Gurls"	EMI	30 June 2010	2	Featured artist
Sir Starmer and Granny Harmers	"Freezing This Christmas" †	IMusician Dissident Brit	13 December 2024	3	2024 Christmas Number One
Stereophonics	"Dakota"	V2	2 March 2005	2	
Stephen Sanchez	"Until I Found You"	Republic	6 July 2023	1	
Storm Queen	"Look Right Through"	Ministry of Sound	10 November 2013	1	One-hit wonder
Stormzy	"Backbone"	0207/Merky	16 August 2024	1	
Sugababes	"Push the Button"	Universal	5 October 2005	4	
Sugababes	"About You Now"	Universal	3 October 2007	4	
Swedish House Mafia	"Don't You Worry Child"	Universal	14 October 2012	1	
Artist	Singles	Record label	Reached number one	Weeks at number one	Notes
Taio Cruz	"Break Your Heart"	Universal	23 September 2009	3	The 100th single ever to reach number one on the UK Official Download Chart
Taio Cruz	"Dynamite"	Universal	29 August 2010	1	
Take That	"Patience" †	Universal	22 November 2006	6	2006 Christmas number one
Take That	"Greatest Day"	Warner	3 December 2008	1	
Tania Foster	"Green Light"	EMI	22 August 2010	1	Featured artist; one-hit wonder
Taylor Swift	"Blank Space"	EMI	13 December 2014	1	
Taylor Swift	"Look What You Made Me Do"	Big Machine	7 September 2017	2	
Taylor Swift	"Anti-Hero"	EMI	17 November 2022	2	
Taylor Swift	"The Fate of Ophelia"	EMI	17 October 2025	7	
Taylor Swift	"Opalite"	EMI	20 February 2026	1	
Taylor Swift	"I Knew It, I Knew You"	EMI	12 June 2026	1	
Taylor Swift	"Patient Zero"	EMI	2 October 2026	1	
Teddy Swims	"Lose Control"	Warner	12 January 2024	5	
Teddy Swims	"Bad Dreams"	Atlantic	20 September 2024	1	
T.I.	"Live Your Life"	Warner	19 November 2008	1	
T.I.	"Blurred Lines"	Universal	2 June 2013	5	Featured artist
The Ting Tings	"That's Not My Name"	Sony	28 May 2008	1	
Timbaland	"The Way I Are"	Universal	18 July 2007	2	
Timbaland	"Apologize"	Universal	9 January 2008	1	
Tinchy Stryder	"Number 1"	Universal	29 April 2009	3	
Tinchy Stryder	"Never Leave You"	Universal	12 August 2009	1	
Tinie Tempah	"Pass Out"	EMI	10 March 2010	3	
Tinie Tempah	"Written in the Stars"	EMI	3 October 2010	1	
Tinie Tempah	"R.I.P."	Sony	13 May 2012	2	Featured artist
Tinie Tempah	"Tsunami (Jump)"	Ministry of Sound	16 March 2014	1	featured artist
Tinie Tempah	"Crazy Stupid Love"	Universal	2 August 2014	1	with Cheryl
Tinie Tempah	"Not Letting Go"	Parlophone	4 July 2015	1	with Jess Glynne
Together for Palestine	"Lullaby" †	T4P	19 December 2025	2	2025 Christmas number one
Tom Grennan	"Let's Go Home Together"	Atlantic	4 March 2021	2	Duet with Ella Henderson
Tom Grennan	"Not Over Yet"	Atlantic	12 August 2022	1	
Tom Grennan	"Lionheart (Fearless)"	Atlantic	8 December 2022	1	
Tom Walker	"Leave a Light On"	Relentless	21 June 2018	1	
Tones and I	"Dance Monkey"	Bad Batch	4 November 2019	12	
Tony Christie	"Is This the Way to Amarillo"	Universal	30 March 2005	4	
Tulisa	"Young"	Universal	7 May 2012	1	
Two Connors	"Familiar Faces"	Isekai Broke	13 February 2026	1	
Artist	Singles	Record label	Reached number one	Weeks at number one	Notes
Ultra Naté	"Movin' to the Sun"	Make the Girls Dance	26 June 2026	10	
Usher	"OMG"	Sony	18 April 2010	2	
U2	"Vertigo"	Universal	6 October 2004	9	
U2	"Sgt. Pepper's Lonely Hearts Club Band"	Universal	13 July 2005	1	Co-credit with Paul McCartney
Artist	Singles	Record label	Reached number one	Weeks at number one	Notes
V	"Slow Dancing"	Big Hit	15 September 2023	1	
V	"Fri(end)s"	Big Hit	22 March 2024	1	
V	"Winter Ahead"	Big Hit	6 December 2024	1	
Victoria Beckham	"Not Such an Innocent Girl"	Virgin	23 January 2026	1	
Artist	Singles	Record label	Reached number one	Weeks at number one	Notes
The Wanted	"Glad You Came"	Universal	17 July 2011	2	
The Wanted	"Gold Forever"	Geffen	5 May 2022	1	
Wanz	"Thrift Shop"	Macklemore	10 February 2013	1	Featured artist; one-hit wonder
The Weeknd	"Blinding Lights"	Republic	23 January 2020	11	
Westlife	"Flying Without Wings" [1]	Sony	1 September 2004	1	The first single ever to reach number one on the UK Official Download Chart
Whitney Houston	"Higher Love"	Sony/Kygo	22 August 2019	5	
Wiley	"Heatwave"	Warner	5 August 2012	2	
will.i.am	"OMG"	Sony	18 April 2010	2	Featured artist
will.i.am	"This Is Love"	Universal	1 July 2012	1	
will.i.am	"Hall of Fame"	Sony	16 September 2012	2	Featured artist; the 200th single ever to reach number one on the UK Official Download Chart
will.i.am	"Scream & Shout"	Universal	13 January 2013	3	
will.i.am	"It's My Birthday"	Universal	19 July 2014	1	
Wiz Khalifa	"Payphone"	Universal	24 June 2012	3	Featured artist
Wiz Khalifa	"See You Again"	Warner	25 April 2015	3	
Wizkid	"One Dance"	Universal/Cash Mooney	17 September 2016	3	as featuring
Woody & Kleiny	"Route 66"	FrtyFve	18 June 2021	1	
Wretch 32	"Don't Go"	Ministry of Sound	21 August 2011	1	
Wyclef Jean	"Hips Don't Lie"	Sony	12 July 2006	4	Featured artist; one-hit wonder
Artist	Singles	Record label	Reached number one	Weeks at number one	Notes
The X Factor Finalists	"Hero"	Sony	5 November 2008	2	Multiple-artist ensemble
The X Factor Finalists	"You Are Not Alone"	Sony	25 November 2009	1	Multiple-artist ensemble
The X Factor Finalists	"Heroes"	Sony	1 December 2010	1	Multiple-artist ensemble
The X Factor Finalists	"Wishing on a Star"	Sony	4 December 2011	1	This record features JLS and One Direction, though the Official Charts Company have decided not to credit them.
X Factor Celebrities 2019	"Run"	Sony	12 December 2019	1	In aid of Shooting Star Children's Hospices.
Artist	Singles	Record label	Reached number one	Weeks at number one	Notes
Years & Years	"King"	Universal	14 March 2015	1	
Yolanda Be Cool	"We No Speak Americano"	Universal	25 July 2010	1	Co-credit with DCUP; one-hit wonder
Yoon Mi-rae	"Neuron"	Big Hit	5 April 2024	1	
Yungblud	"Patience"	BMG/Interscope	26 March 2021	1	
Yungblud	"Changes"	Capitol	25 July 2025	1	
Young Thug	"Havana"	Universal	19 October 2017	5	as featuring
Artist	Singles	Record label	Reached number one	Weeks at number one	Notes
Zara Larsson	"Symphony"	Warner	6 April 2017	3	as featuring
Zayn Malik	"Pillowtalk"	Sony	11 February 2016	1	

== Most number ones ==
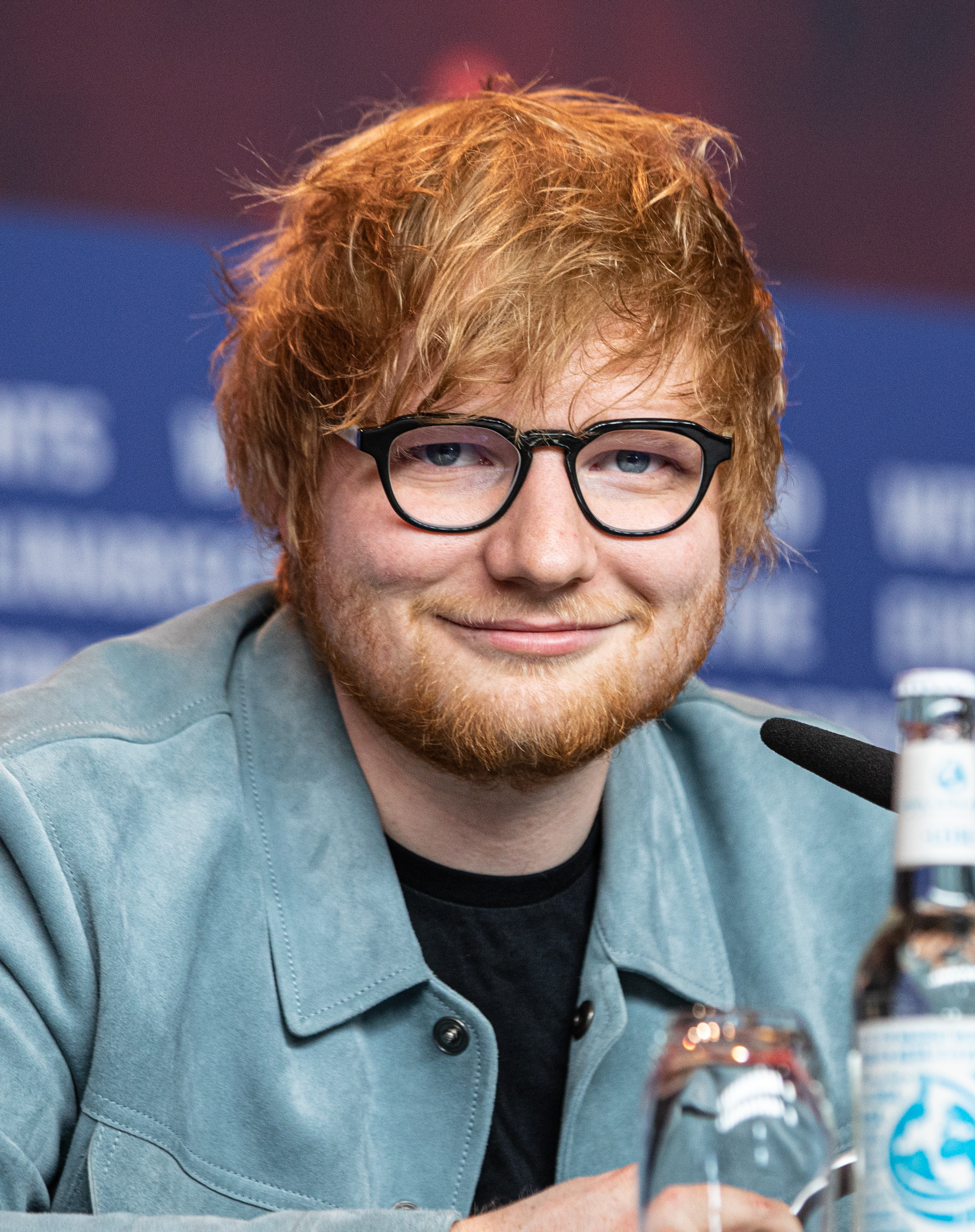
Ed Sheeran has featured on 16 different number-one singles, more than any other artist.

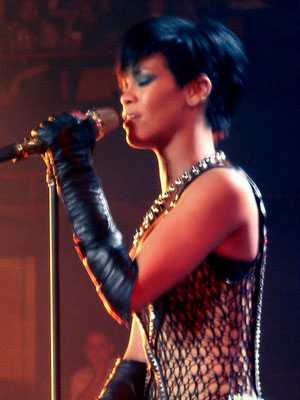
Rihanna was the first ever act to have ten singles top the download chart.

Since its inception in 2004, Seven different artists have reached number-one on the UK Singles Downloads Chart with eight or more singles. To qualify for entry on this list, the act must have been credited as an artist on eight or more number one singles, as recognised by the Official Charts Company. The list does not include credits on multiple-artist charity ensembles. The most successful artist is Ed Sheeran, who has been credited on 16 different number-one singles on the download chart.

Artist	Number ones	Singles	Record label	Reached number one	Weeks at number one
Ed Sheeran	16	"Sing"	Warner	14 June 2014	1
Ed Sheeran	16	"Thinking Out Loud"	Warner	8 November 2014	1
Ed Sheeran	16	"Shape of You"	Atlantic	13 January 2017	9
Ed Sheeran	16	"How Would You Feel (Paean)"	Atlantic	24 February 2017	1
Ed Sheeran	16	"Galway Girl"	Atlantic	24 March 2017	1
Ed Sheeran	16	"Perfect"	Atlantic	14 December 2017	6
Ed Sheeran	16	"River"	Interscope	25 January 2018	1
Ed Sheeran	16	"I Don't Care"	Warner	23 May 2019	6
Ed Sheeran	16	"Bad Habits"	Asylum	2 July 2021	10
Ed Sheeran	16	"Shivers"	Asylum	5 November 2021	2
Ed Sheeran	16	"Merry Christmas"	Atlantic	10 December 2021	2
Ed Sheeran	16	"Sausage Rolls for Everyone"	FrtyFve	24 December 2021	2
Ed Sheeran	16	"The Joker and the Queen"	Asylum	18 February 2022	5
Ed Sheeran	16	"Bam Bam"	Asylum	1 April 2022	1
Ed Sheeran	16	"Azizam"	Asylum	11 April 2025	2
Ed Sheeran	16	"Sapphire"	Asylum	13 June 2025	3
Calvin Harris	14	"Dance wiv Me"	Dirtee Stank	9 July 2008	4
Calvin Harris	14	"I'm Not Alone"	Sony	15 April 2009	2
Calvin Harris	14	"We Found Love"	Sony	15 October 2011	6
Calvin Harris	14	"Sweet Nothing"	Sony	27 October 2012	1
Calvin Harris	14	"Under Control"	Sony	7 December 2013	1
Calvin Harris	14	"Summer"	Sony	10 May 2014	1
Calvin Harris	14	"Blame"	Sony	20 September 2014	1
Calvin Harris	14	"This Is What You Came For"	Sony	12 June 2016	2
Calvin Harris	14	"One Kiss"	Sony	26 April 2018	5
Calvin Harris	14	"Promises"	Sony	30 August 2018	7
Calvin Harris	14	"Giant"	Warner	14 February 2019	7
Calvin Harris	14	"Miracle"	Columbia	23 March 2023	2
Calvin Harris	14	"Desire"	Columbia	4 August 2023	3
Calvin Harris	14	"Blessings"	Columbia	22 May 2025	1
Rihanna	12	"Umbrella"	Universal	23 May 2007	8
Rihanna	12	"Take a Bow"	Universal	21 May 2008	2
Rihanna	12	"Live Your Life"	Warner	19 November 2008	1
Rihanna	12	"Run This Town"	Sony	9 September 2009	1
Rihanna	12	"Russian Roulette"	Universal	9 December 2009	1
Rihanna	12	"Only Girl (In the World)"	Universal	10 November 2010	2
Rihanna	12	"What's My Name?"	Universal	5 January 2011	2
Rihanna	12	"We Found Love"	Universal	9 October 2011	6
Rihanna	12	"Diamonds"	Universal	7 October 2012	1
Rihanna	12	"The Monster"	Universal	3 November 2013	1
Rihanna	12	"This Is What You Came For"	Universal	12 May 2016	2
Rihanna	12	"Lift Me Up"	Def Jam	4 November 2022	1
Ariana Grande	10	"Problem"	Universal	6 July 2014	1
Ariana Grande	10	"Bang Bang"	Universal	28 September 2014	1
Ariana Grande	10	"One Last Time"	Universal	9 June 2017	1
Ariana Grande	10	"No Tears Left to Cry"	Universal	27 April 2018	1
Ariana Grande	10	"Thank U, Next"	Universal	9 November 2018	6
Ariana Grande	10	"7 Rings"	Universal	25 January 2019	4
Ariana Grande	10	"Don't Call Me Angel"	Universal	20 September 2019	1
Ariana Grande	10	"Rain on Me"	Universal	29 May 2020	4
Ariana Grande	10	"Yes, And?"	Universal	19 January 2024	1
Ariana Grande	10	"Hate That I Made You Love Me"	Universal	5 June 2026	1
Sam Smith	8	"La La La"	Universal	26 May 2013	1
Sam Smith	8	"Money On My Mind"	Universal	23 February 2014	1
Sam Smith	8	"Stay With Me"	Universal	31 May 2014	1
Sam Smith	8	"Lay Me Down"	Universal	21 March 2015	1
Sam Smith	8	"Too Good At Goodbyes"	Universal	21 September 2017	1
Sam Smith	8	"Promises"	Universal	30 August 2018	1
Sam Smith	8	"Dancing with a Stranger"	Universal	7 February 2019	1
Sam Smith	8	"Desire"	Universal	4 August 2023	3
Lady Gaga	8	"Just Dance"	Interscope	14 January 2009	3
Lady Gaga	8	"Poker Face"	Interscope	25 March 2009	3
Lady Gaga	8	"Bad Romance"	Interscope	16 December 2009	2
Lady Gaga	8	"Telephone"	Interscope	31 March 2010	1
Lady Gaga	8	"Shallow"	Interscope	18 October 2018	4
Lady Gaga	8	"Stupid Love"	Interscope	12 March 2020	1
Lady Gaga	8	"Rain on Me"	Interscope	7 February 2020	4
Lady Gaga	8	"Die with a Smile"	Interscope	23 August 2024	3
BTS	8	"On"	Big Hit	5 March 2020	1
BTS	8	"Dynamite"	Big Hit	3 September 2020	1
BTS	8	"Life Goes On"	Big Hit	27 November 2020	1
BTS	8	"Butter"	Big Hit	28 May 2021	2
BTS	8	"My Universe"	Parlophone	1 October 2021	1
BTS	8	"Swim"	Big Hit	27 March 2026	4
BTS	8	"Come Over"	Big Hit	20 June 2026	1
BTS	8	"Normal"	Big Hit	24 July 2026	1

== Songs with most weeks at number one ==
This is a list of most weeks at number one by song main artist(s) only.

Artist(s)	Singles	Record label	Reached number one	Weeks at number one
Tones and I	"Dance Monkey"	Bad Batch	4 October 2019	12
Gnarls Barkley	"Crazy"	Warner	22 March 2006	11
Luis Fonsi	"Despacito"	Def Jam	18 May 2017	11
The Weeknd	"Blinding Lights"	Universal	23 January 2020	11
Ed Sheeran	"Bad Habits"	Asylum	2 July 2021	10
Hugel, Imael Angel and Ultra Naté	"Movin' to the Sun"	Make the Girls Dance	25 June 2026	10
U2	"Vertigo"	Universal	6 October 2004	9
Ed Sheeran	"Shape of You"	Warner	19 January 2017	9
Rihanna	"Umbrella"	Universal	23 May 2007	8
Miley Cyrus	"Flowers"	Columbia	20 January 2023	8
Madonna	"Hung Up"	Warner	2 November 2005	7
Scissor Sisters	"I Don't Feel Like Dancin'"	Universal	23 August 2006	7
Leona Lewis	"Bleeding Love"	Sony	31 October 2007	7
Elton John and Dua Lipa	"Cold Heart"	EMI	16 September 2021	7
LF System	"Afraid to Feel"	Warner	7 July 2022	7
David Guetta and Bebe Rexha	"I'm Good (Blue)"	Parlophone	9 September 2022	7
Kylie Minogue	"Padam Padam"	BMG	26 May 2023	7

== One-hit wonders ==
For the purposes of this list, a one-hit wonder is defined as an act that has reached number one on the UK Official Download Chart but has not charted with any other single either before or since artists that have charted previously with a band or exempt.

Artist	Single	Record label	Reached number one	Weeks at number one	Notes
Mouldy Lookin' Stain	"Dogz Don't Kill People Wabbits Do"	Warner	27 October 2004	1	A parody of Goldie Lookin' Chain's single "Guns Don't Kill People Rappers Do" by BBC Radio 1 DJ Chris Moyles.
Nizlopi	"JCB"	FDM	21 December 2005	1	Two school friends John Parker and Luke Concannon had a surprise #1 hit, but failed to chart again.
The Notorious B.I.G.	"Nasty Girl"	Bad Boy	25 January 2006	2	had most of his hits before the download chart first published.
The Proclaimers	"I'm Gonna Be (500 Miles)"	EMI	21 March 2007	3	Re-released in 2007 with vocals by Peter Kay and Matt Lucas in aid of Comic Relief.
Mint Royale	"Singin' in the Rain"	Faith & Hope	11 June 2008	2	Re-released in 2008 after George Sampson used the track in his winning dance on the second series of Britain's Got Talent with the one-time duo having a number of Top 40 hits before this chart was first published. In 2020, member Neil Claxton returned to releasing music under the Mint Royale name without success
Kid Rock	"All Summer Long"	Warner	6 August 2008	1	Follow-up singles failed to chart and had hits before the download chart existed.
Rage Against the Machine	"Killing in the Name"	Sony	23 December 2009	2	Reached number one after an online campaign pushed it to the top. The band had charting singles before the download chart existed.
Yolanda Be Cool & DCUP	"We No Speak Americano"	Universal	25 July 2010	1	These Australian dance music acts had a follow-up hit in their native country with a version of Rodriguez's "Sugar Man" but the record failed to chart in the UK
Gotye	"Somebody That I Used to Know"	Universal	12 February 2012	5	This record features New Zealand singer Kimbra
Sam and the Womp	"Bom Bom"	Stiff	26 August 2012	1	Follow-up singles failed to chart.
Storm Queen	"Look Right Through"	Ministry of Sound	10 November 2013	1	DJ Morgan Geist released "For A Fool" under the Storm Queen name in 2021 without success
Route 94	"My Love"	Rinse	15 March 2014	1	This single is by Route 94 featuring Jess Glynne, with the latter artist having seven 'Official' number ones in the main chart.
Borgeous	"Tsunami (Jump)"	Ministry of Sound	22 March 2014	1	This single is by Dvbbs and Borgeous featuring Tinie Tempah
Deorro	"Five More Hours"	Warner	27 June 2015	1	Deorro is known in the United States for his song "Bailar" with Pitbull and Elvis Crespo, though this Billboard Top 40 hit did not chart in the UK.
David Zowie	"House Every Weekend"	Universal	16 July 2015	1	First number one when the charts were changed from Sunday to Friday.
Rachel Platten	"Fight Song"	Universal	3 September 2015	1	Follow-up singles failed to chart.
Jamie Lawson	"Wasn't Expecting That"	Warner	22 October 2015	1	Follow-up singles failed to chart.
Kungs	"This Girl"	3 Beat	23 June 2016	4	The Follow-up reached no.172 outside chart.
Dalton Harris	"The Power of Love"	Sony	13 December 2018	1	The winner of X-Factor 2018 follow-up single "Cry" did not chart.
RSPB	"Let Nature Sing"	RSPB	9 May 2019	1	The track was mixed by Adrian Thomas, Sam Lee and Bill Barclay, and released by the RSPB through Horus Music. The single was created to raise awareness of threats to birds and its release was timed to coincide with International Dawn Chorus Day on 5 May 2019. It reached number 18 on the UK Singles Chart, marking the first time a recording solely of birds had entered the charts,
André Rieu and Johann Strauss Orchestra	"Ode to Joy"	Decca	6 February 2020	1	This recording was picked as a protest song against Brexit.
Michael Ball, Captain Tom and The NHS Voices of Care Choir	"You'll Never Walk Alone"	Decca	30 April 2020	1	Charity record in aid of NHS Charities Together during the COVID-19 pandemic. The oldest man to get a number one hit, Captain Sir Thomas Moore died in February 2021, whilst Michael Ball has had three number ones in the albums chart with Alfie Boe.
Jawsh 685	"Savage Love (Laxed – Siren Beat)"	RCA	2 July 2020	4	Jawsh 685's instrumental song "Laxed (Siren Beat)" was used by singer Jason Derulo for his song "Savage Love", which resulted in both artists getting a credit for the latter's single, which was re-titled "Savage Love (Laxed – Siren Beat)" by the time it was a hit.
Everton F.C.	"Spirit of the Blues"	13th Moon	8 October 2020	1	This football club have had many hits in the national charts with different team line-ups and variations on the Everton FC name
Paul Harvey & BBC Philharmonic	"Four Notes – Paul's Tune"	Redrocca	6 November 2020	2	A charity record for the Alzheimer's Society and Music for Dementia
Mental As Anything	"Live It Up"	Crimson	17 December 2020	1	Similar to Ant & Dec's recordings, Edsel/Demon have picked up the rights to this band's back catalogue, with this song (their only UK hit from 1987) being purchased by football fans after becoming an unofficial anthem of Glasgow-based team Rangers FC.
Asian Dub Foundation	"Comin' Over Here"	Xray	2 January 2021	1	This act have had six hit singles on the national charts before this chart began including a Top 40 hit ("Buzzin'"), while this release features comedian Stewart Lee.
Woody & Kleiny	"Route 66"	FrtyFve	18 June 2021	1	This is a song by former Britain's Got Talent contestants and YouTubers Woody & Kleiny, who recorded this Euro 2020 tie-in with The Hoosiers, a band who had four Top 40 hits on the main singles chart between 2007 and 2010.
Gayle	"ABCDEFU"	Atlantic	7 January 2022	2	"ABCDEFU" (stylized in all lowercase, also known by its radio edited title "ABC") was the major-label debut single by American singer reaching number one however she never charted again despite releasing a string of follow-up singles.
Stephen Sanchez	"Until I Found You"	Republic	7 June 2023	1	released in 2021 since today this is the only entry to chart and it only peaked at No.1 due to the leaking of the Rosé cover.
Cassö	"Prada"	Ministry of Sound	5 October 2023	3	

=== As a featured artist ===
Artist	Single	Main artist credit	Record label	Reached number one	Weeks at number one
Jagged Edge	"Nasty Girl"	The Notorious B.I.G.	Bad Boy	21 January 2006	2
Avery Storm	"Nasty Girl"	The Notorious B.I.G.	Bad Boy	21 January 2006	2
Leo Sayer	"Thunder in My Heart Again"	Meck	Universal	11 February 2006	2
DJ Mental Theo's Bazzheadz	"Now You're Gone"	Basshunter	Hard2Beat	12 January 2008	3
Laza Morgan	"Start Without You"	Alexandra Burke	Sony	11 September 2010	2
Eric Turner	"Written in the Stars"	Tinie Tempah	EMI	2 October 2010	1
Lauren Bennett	"Party Rock Anthem"	LMFAO	Universal	17 April 2011	4
GoonRock	"Party Rock Anthem"	LMFAO	Universal	17 April 2011	4
Nayer	"Give Me Everything"	Pitbull	Sony	22 May 2011	3
Sian Evans	"Louder"	DJ Fresh	Ministry of Sound	10 July 2011	1
Josh Kumra	"Don't Go"	Wretch 32	Ministry of Sound	21 August 2011	1
Kimbra	"Somebody That I Used to Know"	Gotye	Universal	12 February 2012	5
Wanz	"Thrift Shop"	Macklemore and Ryan Lewis	Macklemore LLC	10 February 2013	1
A*M*E	"Need U (100%)"	Duke Dumont	Ministry of Sound	7 April 2013	2
Cody Wise	"It's My Birthday"	Will.i.am	Universal	19 July 2014	1
Cookin' on 3 Burners	"This Girl"	Kungs	3 Beat	23 June 2016	4
Dan Caplen	"These Days"	Rudimental	Warner	15 February 2018	6
Stewart Lee	"Comin' Over Here"	Asian Dub Foundation	Xray	2 January 2021	1
Mufasa & Hypeman	"Friday"	Riton and Nightcrawlers	Ministry of Sound	23 April 2021	1
Andriy Khlyvnyuk	"Hey, Hey, Rise Up!"	Pink Floyd	Rhino	15 April 2022	1
Kirsty MacColl	"Fairytale of New York"	The Pogues	Pogue Malone	8 December 2023	1
Loco	"Smeraldo Garden Marching Band"	Jimin	Big Hit Music	5 June 2024	1

=== Ensemble groups ===
Artist	Single	Record label	Reached number one	Weeks at number one	Notes
Band Aid 20	"Do They Know It's Christmas?"	Universal	8 December 2004	4	Released in aid of Band Aid.
Helping Haiti	"Everybody Hurts"	Sony	17 February 2010	1	Released in aid of victims of the 2010 Haiti earthquake.
Shout For England	"Shout"	Sony	13 June 2010	2	Unofficial anthem of the England national football team's 2010 FIFA World Cup campaign in South Africa.
The Justice Collective	"He Ain't Heavy, He's My Brother"	Metropolis	23 December 2012	1	Released in honour of the victims of the Hillsborough disaster, with The Farm associated Collective charity project also having hits on the national charts under the names The Liverpool Collective and The Peace Collective.
Gareth Malone's All Star Choir	"Wake Me Up"	Universal	22 November 2014	1	released in aid of Children in Need.
Band Aid 30	"Do They Know It's Christmas?"	EMI	29 November 2014	2	Released in aid of Band Aid.
Lewisham and Greenwich NHS Choir	"A Bridge over You"	Emu Bands	31 December 2015	1	Re-released due a Christmas number one campaign, with profits in aid of the Lewisham and Greenwich NHS Trust. The Lewisham and Greenwich NHS Choir have also featured on charity versions of Justin Bieber's "Holy" and the number one download hit "Anywhere Away From Here" by Rag‘n’Bone Man and P!nk, but both songs were combined with the already charting originals by the Official Charts Company, with no additional credits for the choir.
Artists For Grenfell	"Bridge over Troubled Water"	Sony	23 June 2017	2	In aid of the Grenfell Tower fire.
X Factor Celebrities 2019	"Run"	Sony	12 December 2019	1	In aid of Shooting Star Children's Hospices.
Live Lounge Allstars	"Times Like These"	BBC/Columbia	7 May 2020	2	Response to COVID-19 pandemic in aid of Children in Need and Comic Relief.
BBC Radio 2 Allstars	"Stop Crying Your Heart Out"	Decca	20 November 2020	1	For Children in Need 2020
Rock Choir/Vocal Group/Caroline Redman Lusher	"Keeping the Dream Alive"	Rock	24 December 2020	1	In Support of Mental Health Foundation
Joss Stone/Change/Check Choir	"Golden"	ITV Studios	18 November 2023	1	In Support of Breast Cancer Research
Creator Universe	"I Wish It Could Be Christmas Everyday"	We Create Popular	22 December 2023	1	In Support of The Trussell Trust
Marti Pellow/Change/Check Choir	"Love Is All Around"	ITV Studios	18 October 2024	1	In Support of Breast Cancer Research
Together for Palestine	"Lullaby"	T4P	19 December 2025	2	in aid of Choose Love

== See also ==
- Lists of one-hit wonders
