= List of UK Singles Downloads Chart number ones of the 2000s =

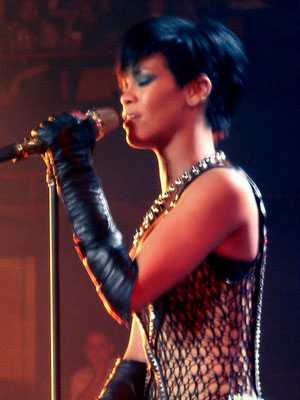
Barbadian singer Rihanna featured on five different number-one singles during the 2000s, more than any other artist.

The UK Singles Downloads Chart is a weekly music chart that ranks the most-downloaded singles in the United Kingdom. During the 2000s, the chart was compiled by The Official UK Charts Company (OCC) on behalf of the British music industry, and was based solely on non-subscription music downloads from selected online music stores. It was compiled using weekly sales from Sunday to Saturday, and was published each Wednesday afternoon, so as not to clash with the Sunday evening announcement of the UK Singles Chart.

The chart was founded in September 2004 as the UK Official Download Chart, with the first single to top the chart being a live version of "Flying Without Wings" by Irish boy band Westlife. By the end of the decade, 109 further singles had topped the chart. The most downloaded single of the 2000s was "Poker Face" by Lady Gaga. Released in 2009, the song was downloaded 779,000 times, and topped the chart for three weeks. "Just Dance", also by Gaga, and "Sex on Fire" by Kings of Leon were the third and second highest selling downloads of the decade respectively. The single that spent the longest time at number one was "Crazy" by Gnarls Barkley, which spent 11 weeks at the top and became the UK's 18th best-selling download of the 2000s.

The most successful artist of the decade was Barbadian singer Rihanna, who featured on five different number-one singles for a total of 13 weeks. The most successful record label was Universal Music Group; with an artist roster that included Rihanna, The Black Eyed Peas and U2, Universal spent 110 weeks at number one with 40 different singles. The final number one of the 2000s was "Killing in the Name", a 1993 single by American rap metal band Rage Against the Machine, which was pushed to the top of the chart as a result of an online campaign to prevent Joe McElderry, the 2009 winner of The X Factor, from reaching number one. "Killing in the Name" sold over 500,000 copies in one week, making it the UK's fastest-selling digital download of all time.

== Chart history ==
Before the inauguration of the download chart, only sales of physical formats—such as CD, vinyl and cassette tape—contributed towards a single's position on the UK music charts. From the late 1990s onwards, these sales began to significantly decline. By the start of 2004, they had dropped to their lowest level in over 35 years, with singles needing to sell only 35,000 copies to reach number one. One year later, a limited edition re-release of "One Night" / "I Got Stung" by Elvis Presley topped the chart with 22,000 copies, making it the lowest selling number-one single at that time. Conversely, the music download market was growing considerably: during the same 2004–05 period, sales of downloads grew by 743%, and overtook physical sales in December 2004. The following year, the UK's online music revenue reached €42.1 million.

"The [first download chart] proved that for the moment online purchases need to exist in their own separate bubble, if only until stunts such as Westlife releasing a live version of a five year old song as an online exclusive cease to have any meaningful impact."

— UK chart commentator James Masterton

As a result of this growth, the OCC were commissioned in 2004 to compile a new music chart based solely on the UK's download sales, which was initially sponsored by Coca-Cola. A "sample" download chart was trialled for 10 weeks, with the first number one being "Bam Thwok" by American rock band Pixies. After this ten-week period, the UK Official Download Chart was launched on 1 September 2004, with Westlife achieving the first official number one. The group topped the chart with a live version of their 1999 single "Flying Without Wings", a move that UK chart commentator James Masterton branded a "stunt".

By 2007 the UK had become Europe's largest consumer of online music, with almost 78 million tracks being downloaded that year – by the end of the decade this figure had nearly doubled. Sales of downloaded singles were finally incorporated into the UK Singles Chart in April 2005 – as of February 2015, the UK Official Download Chart continues to be published each week by the OCC, under the name the UK Singles Downloads Chart.

== Number ones ==
Key
No.	nth single to top the UK Official Download Chart
N/A	Reached number one on an unofficial, "sample" download chart
re	Return of a single to number one
‡	Most-downloaded single of the decade

No.	Artist (Note: The artist, single, record label, date of reaching number one and number of weeks at number one are those given by the OCC.)	Single	Record label	Reached number one	Weeks at number one
2004
N/A	Pixies	"Bam Thwok"	Not on label (Note: "Bam Thwok" by Pixies was distributed exclusively on iTunes.)	23 June 2004	1
N/A	Maroon 5	"This Love"	Sony	30 June 2004	1
N/A	The Streets	"Dry Your Eyes"	Warner	7 July 2004	5
N/A	Shapeshifters	"Lola's Theme"	EMI	11 August 2004	3
1	Westlife	"Flying Without Wings" (Live)	Sony	1 September 2004	1
2	Natasha Bedingfield	"These Words"	Sony	8 September 2004	4
3	U2	"Vertigo"	Universal	6 October 2004	3
4	Mouldy Lookin' Stain	"Dogz Don't Kill People Wabbits Do"	Warner	27 October 2004	1
re	U2	"Vertigo"	Universal	3 November 2004	5
5	Band Aid 20	"Do They Know It's Christmas?"	Universal	8 December 2004	4
2005
re	U2	"Vertigo"	Universal	5 January 2005	1
6	Gwen Stefani	"What You Waiting For?"	Universal	12 January 2005	2
7	Green Day	"Boulevard of Broken Dreams"	Warner	26 January 2005	1
8	The Chemical Brothers	"Galvanize"	EMI	2 February 2005	4
9	Stereophonics	"Dakota"	V2	2 March 2005	2
10	McFly	"All About You"	Universal	16 March 2005	2
11	Tony Christie featuring Peter Kay	"Is This the Way to Amarillo"	Universal	30 March 2005	4
12	Coldplay	"Speed of Sound"	EMI	27 April 2005	3
13	The Black Eyed Peas	"Don't Phunk with My Heart"	Universal	18 May 2005	2
14	Gorillaz	"Feel Good Inc."	EMI	1 June 2005	3
15	James Blunt	"You're Beautiful"	Warner	22 June 2005	3
16	Paul McCartney and U2	"Sgt. Pepper's Lonely Hearts Club Band"	Universal	13 July 2005	1
17	Elton John	"Electricity"	Universal	20 July 2005	1
re	James Blunt	"You're Beautiful"	Warner	27 July 2005	2
18	Daniel Powter	"Bad Day"	Warner	10 August 2005	5
19	The Pussycat Dolls featuring Busta Rhymes	"Don't Cha"	Universal	14 September 2005	3
20	Sugababes	"Push the Button"	Universal	5 October 2005	4
21	Madonna	"Hung Up"	Warner	2 November 2005	7
22	Nizlopi	"JCB"	FDM	21 December 2005	1
23	Shayne Ward	"That's My Goal"	Sony	28 December 2005	2
2006
re	Nizlopi	"JCB"	FDM	11 January 2006	2
24	The Notorious B.I.G. featuring Diddy, Nelly, Jagged Edge and Avery Storm	"Nasty Girl"	Warner	25 January 2006	2
25	The Ordinary Boys	"Boys Will Be Boys"	Warner	8 February 2006	1
26	Meck featuring Leo Sayer	"Thunder in My Heart Again"	Universal	15 February 2006	2
27	Corinne Bailey Rae	"Put Your Records On"	EMI	1 March 2006	2
28	Orson	"No Tomorrow"	Universal	15 March 2006	1
29	Gnarls Barkley	"Crazy"	Warner	22 March 2006	11
30	Sandi Thom	"I Wish I Was a Punk Rocker (With Flowers in My Hair)"	Sony	7 June 2006	1
31	Nelly Furtado	"Maneater"	Universal	14 June 2006	4
32	Shakira featuring Wyclef Jean	"Hips Don't Lie"	Sony	12 July 2006	4
33	Justin Timberlake	"SexyBack"	Sony	9 August 2006	1
re	Shakira featuring Wyclef Jean	"Hips Don't Lie"	Sony	16 August 2006	1
34	Scissor Sisters	"I Don't Feel Like Dancin'"	Universal	23 August 2006	7
35	Razorlight	"America"	Universal	11 October 2006	3
36	McFly	"Star Girl"	Universal	1 November 2006	1
37	Fedde le Grand	"Put Your Hands Up 4 Detroit"	Ministry of Sound	8 November 2006	1
38	All Saints	"Rock Steady"	EMI	15 November 2006	1
39	Take That	"Patience"	Universal	22 November 2006	5
40	Leona Lewis	"A Moment Like This"	Sony	27 December 2006	2
2007
re	Take That	"Patience"	Universal	10 January 2007	1
41	Mika	"Grace Kelly"	Universal	17 January 2007	6
42	Kaiser Chiefs	"Ruby"	Universal	28 February 2007	3
43	The Proclaimers featuring Brian Potter and Andy Pipkin	"I'm Gonna Be (500 Miles)"	EMI	21 March 2007	3
44	Avril Lavigne	"Girlfriend"	Sony	11 April 2007	1
45	Mark Ronson featuring Daniel Merriweather	"Stop Me"	Sony	18 April 2007	1
46	Beyoncé and Shakira	"Beautiful Liar"	Sony	25 April 2007	3
47	Gym Class Heroes	"Cupid's Chokehold"	Warner	16 May 2007	1
48	Rihanna featuring Jay-Z	"Umbrella"	Universal	23 May 2007	8
49	Timbaland featuring Keri Hilson and D.O.E.	"The Way I Are"	Universal	18 July 2007	2
50	Kate Nash	"Foundations"	Universal	25 July 2007	2
51	Kanye West	"Stronger"	Universal	15 August 2007	2
52	Sean Kingston	"Beautiful Girls"	Sony	29 August 2007	2
53	Plain White T's	"Hey There Delilah"	EMI	12 September 2007	3
54	Sugababes	"About You Now"	Universal	3 October 2007	4
55	Leona Lewis	"Bleeding Love"	Sony	31 October 2007	7
56	Mariah Carey	"All I Want for Christmas Is You"	Sony	19 December 2007	1
57	Leon Jackson	"When You Believe"	Sony	26 December 2007	2
2008
58	Timbaland presents OneRepublic	"Apologize"	Universal	9 January 2008	1
59	Basshunter featuring DJ Mental Theo's Bazzheadz	"Now You're Gone"	Ministry of Sound	16 January 2008	3
60	Adele	"Chasing Pavements"	Beggars	6 February 2008	1
61	Nickelback	"Rockstar"	Warner	13 February 2008	1
62	Duffy	"Mercy"	Universal	20 February 2008	5
63	Estelle featuring Kanye West	"American Boy"	Warner	26 March 2008	4
64	Madonna featuring Justin Timberlake	"4 Minutes"	Warner	23 April 2008	4
65	Rihanna	"Take a Bow"	Universal	21 May 2008	1
66	The Ting Tings	"That's Not My Name"	Sony	28 May 2008	1
re	Rihanna	"Take a Bow"	Universal	4 June 2008	1
67	Mint Royale	"Singin' in the Rain"	Sony	11 June 2008	2
68	Coldplay	"Viva la Vida"	EMI	25 June 2008	2
69	Dizzee Rascal featuring Calvin Harris and Chrome	"Dance wiv Me"	Dirtee Stank	9 July 2008	4
70	Kid Rock	"All Summer Long"	Warner	6 August 2008	1
71	Katy Perry	"I Kissed a Girl"	EMI	13 August 2008	5
72	Kings of Leon	"Sex on Fire"	Sony	17 September 2008	3
73	Pink	"So What"	Sony	8 October 2008	3
74	Girls Aloud	"The Promise"	Universal	29 October 2008	1
75	The X Factor Finalists	"Hero"	Sony	5 November 2008	2
76	T.I. featuring Rihanna	"Live Your Life"	Warner	19 November 2008	1
77	Beyoncé	"If I Were a Boy"	Sony	26 November 2008	1
78	Take That	"Greatest Day"	Universal	3 December 2008	1
79	Leona Lewis	"Run"	Sony	10 December 2008	2
80	Alexandra Burke	"Hallelujah"	Sony	24 December 2008	3
2009
81	Lady Gaga	"Just Dance"	Warner	14 January 2009	3
82	Lily Allen	"The Fear"	EMI	4 February 2009	4
83	Kelly Clarkson	"My Life Would Suck Without You"	Sony	4 March 2009	1
84	Flo Rida featuring Kesha	"Right Round"	Universal	11 March 2009	2
85	Lady Gaga	"Poker Face" ‡	Warner	25 March 2009	3
86	Calvin Harris	"I'm Not Alone"	Sony	15 April 2009	2
87	Tinchy Stryder featuring N-Dubz	"Number 1"	Universal	29 April 2009	3
88	The Black Eyed Peas	"Boom Boom Pow"	Universal	20 May 2009	1
89	Dizzee Rascal and Armand Van Helden	"Bonkers"	Dirtee Stank	27 May 2009	2
re	The Black Eyed Peas	"Boom Boom Pow"	Universal	10 June 2009	1
90	Pixie Lott	"Mama Do (Uh Oh, Uh Oh)"	Universal	17 June 2009	1
91	David Guetta featuring Kelly Rowland	"When Love Takes Over"	EMI	24 June 2009	1
92	La Roux	"Bulletproof"	Warner	1 July 2009	1
93	Cascada	"Evacuate the Dancefloor"	Universal	8 July 2009	2
94	JLS	"Beat Again"	Sony	22 July 2009	2
95	The Black Eyed Peas	"I Gotta Feeling"	Universal	5 August 2009	1
96	Tinchy Stryder featuring Amelle Berrabah	"Never Leave You"	Universal	12 August 2009	1
re	The Black Eyed Peas	"I Gotta Feeling"	Universal	19 August 2009	1
97	David Guetta featuring Akon	"Sexy Chick"	EMI	26 August 2009	1
98	Dizzee Rascal	"Holiday"	Dirtee Stank	2 September 2009	1
99	Jay-Z featuring Rihanna and Kanye West	"Run This Town"	Sony	9 September 2009	1
re	David Guetta featuring Akon	"Sexy Chick"	EMI	16 September 2009	1
100	Taio Cruz	"Break Your Heart"	Universal	23 September 2009	3
101	Chipmunk	"Oopsy Daisy"	Sony	14 October 2009	1
102	Alexandra Burke featuring Flo Rida	"Bad Boys"	Sony	21 October 2009	1
103	Cheryl Cole	"Fight for This Love"	Universal	28 October 2009	2
104	JLS	"Everybody in Love"	Sony	11 November 2009	1
105	The Black Eyed Peas	"Meet Me Halfway"	Universal	18 November 2009	1
106	The X Factor Finalists 2009	"You Are Not Alone"	Sony	25 November 2009	1
107	Jason Derülo	"Whatcha Say"	Warner	2 December 2009	1
108	Rihanna	"Russian Roulette"	Universal	9 December 2009	1
109	Lady Gaga	"Bad Romance"	Warner	16 December 2009	1
110	Rage Against the Machine	"Killing in the Name"	Sony	23 December 2009	2

=== By artist ===
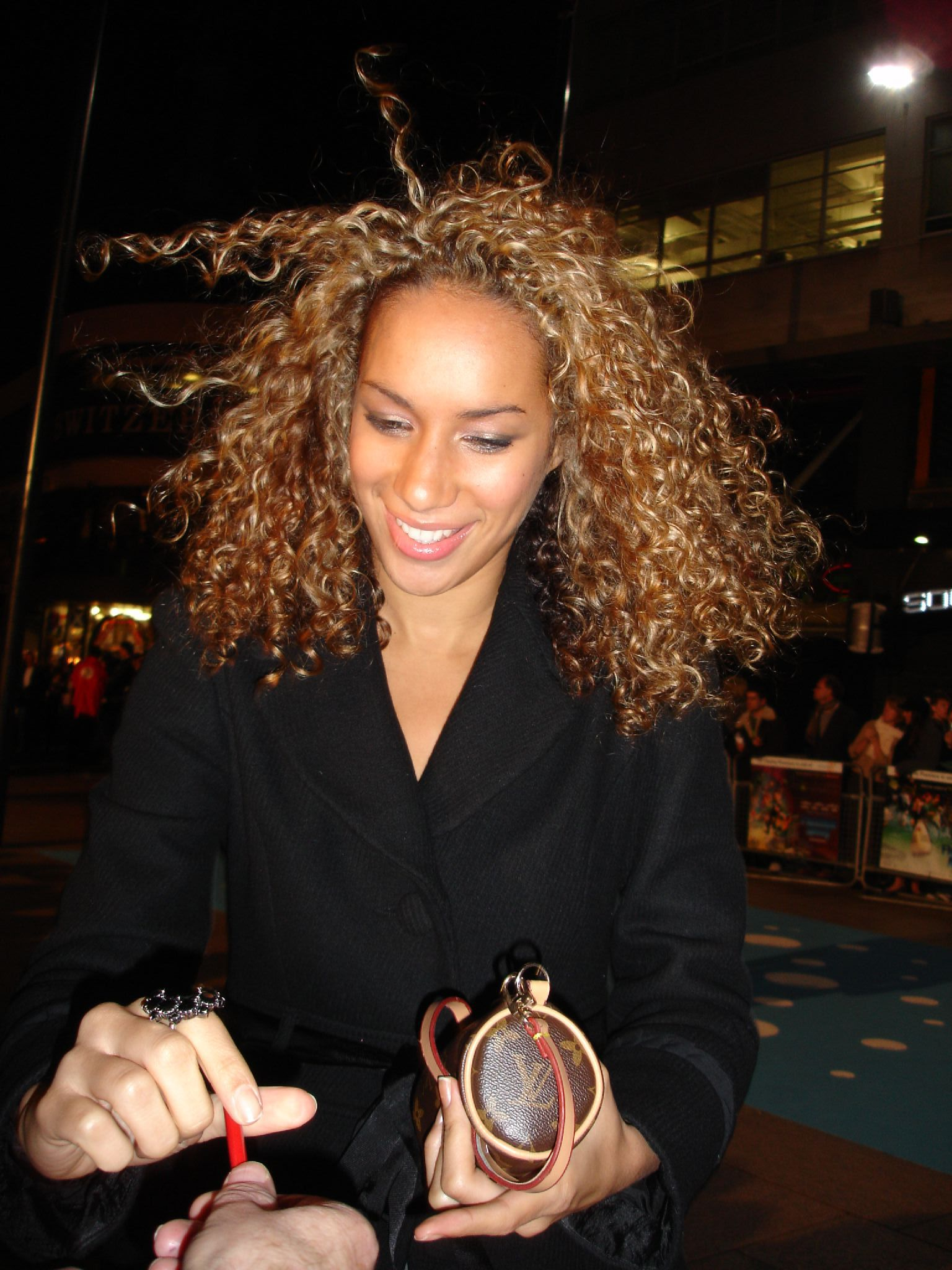
Singer Leona Lewis topped the UK Official Download Chart three times during the 2000s.

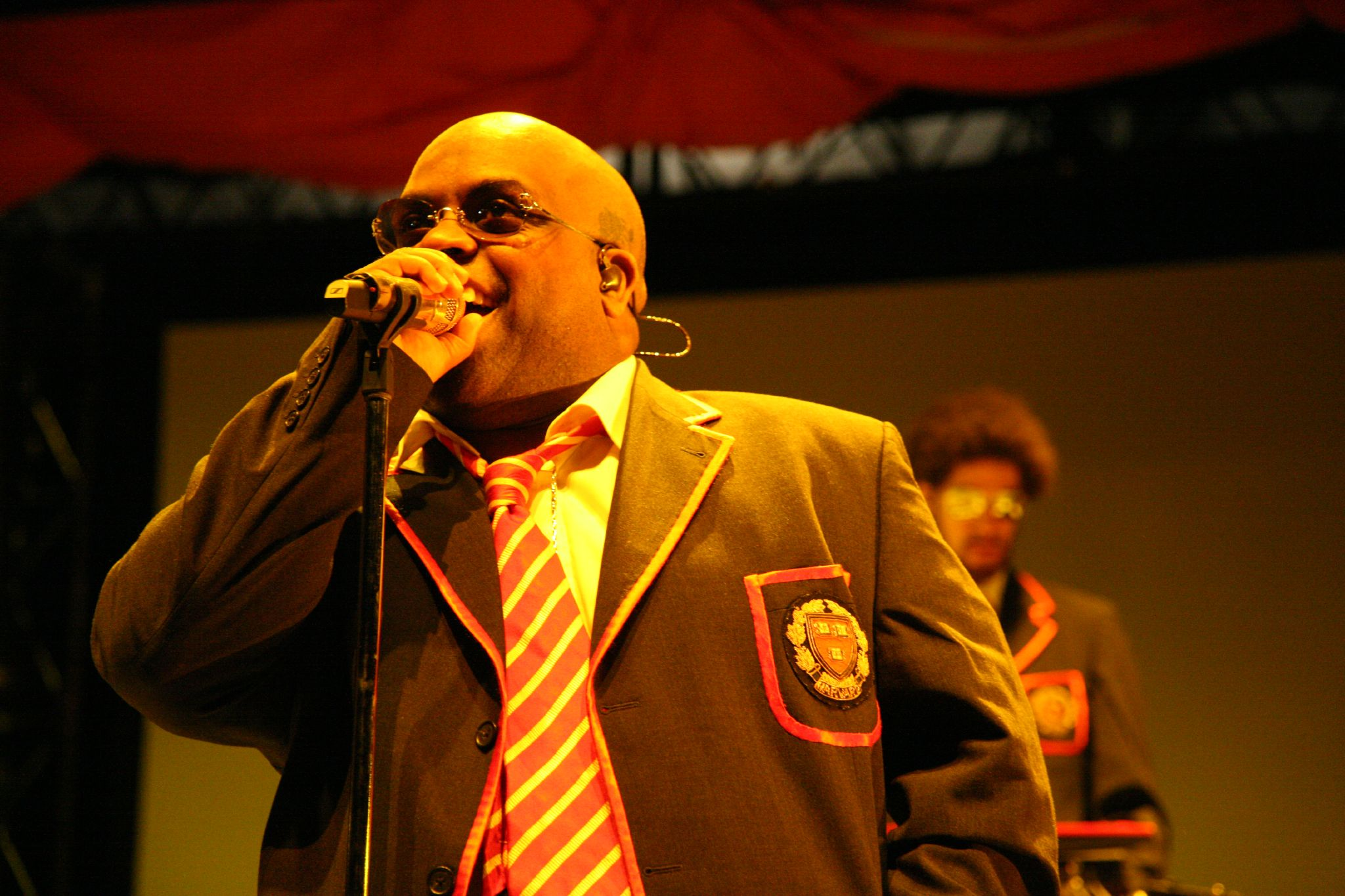
"Crazy" by Gnarls Barkley spent eleven weeks at the top of the chart, longer than any other single.

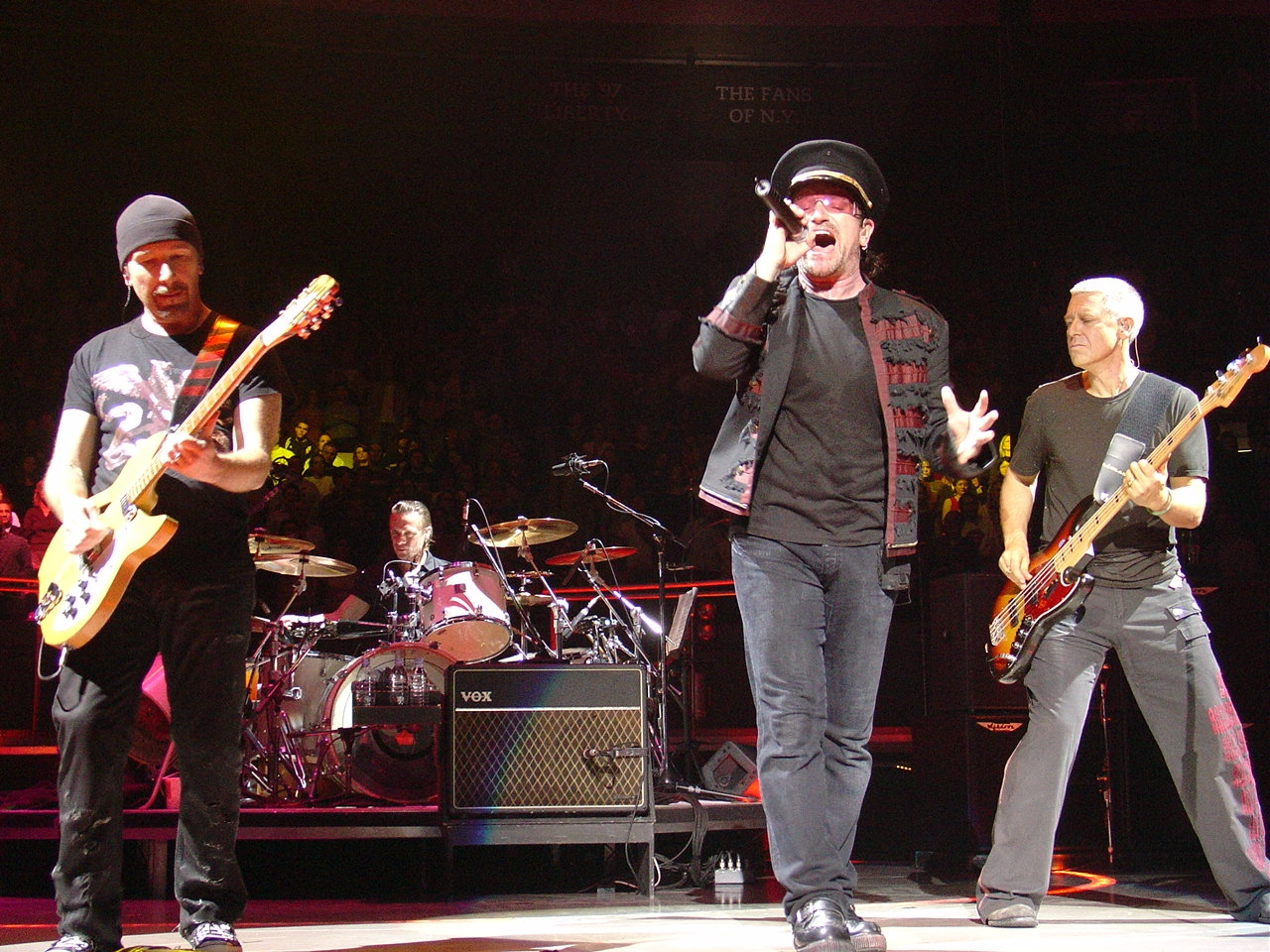
U2 were one of the first acts to top the official download chart, with their single "Vertigo".

Fifteen different artists spent seven or more weeks at the top of the UK Official Download Chart during the 2000s. The totals below include only credited performances, and do not include appearances on charity ensembles such as Band Aid 20 or The X Factor Finalists.

Artist	Number-one singles (Note: The totals count only singles that reached number one on or after 1 September 2004.)	Weeks at number one
The Black Eyed Peas	4	7
Dizzee Rascal	3	7
Gnarls Barkley	1	11
Jay-Z	2	9
Peter Kay (Note: The totals for Peter Kay include a credit as Brian Potter.)	2	7
Lady Gaga	3	7
Leona Lewis	3	11
Madonna	2	11
Rihanna	5	13
Scissor Sisters	1	7
Shakira	2	8
Sugababes	2	8
Take That	2	7
U2	2	10
Kanye West	3	7

=== By record label ===
Nine different record labels released chart-topping singles during the 2000s.

Record label	Number-one singles	Weeks at number one
Beggars Group	1	1
Dirtee Stank	3	7
EMI	12	34
FDM Records	1	3
Ministry of Sound	2	4
Sony BMG	31	65
Universal Music Group	40	110
V2 Records	1	2
Warner Music Group	19	53

== Download sites ==
During the 2000s, the UK Official Download Chart was compiled by the OCC using data from the following music download websites:

- 7digital
- Big Noise Music
- Bleep
- City 16
- easyMusic
- HMV
- iTunes
- KarmaDownload
- Metacharge
- MSN Music
- The Music Engine Service
- MyCokeMusic
- Napster
- OD2
- Playlouder
- Recordstore
- Sonic Selector
- Tesco
- Tiscali Music
- Virgin
- Wanadoo
- Wippit
- Woolworths
