= Charly Lownoise and Mental Theo =

Dutch DJ duo

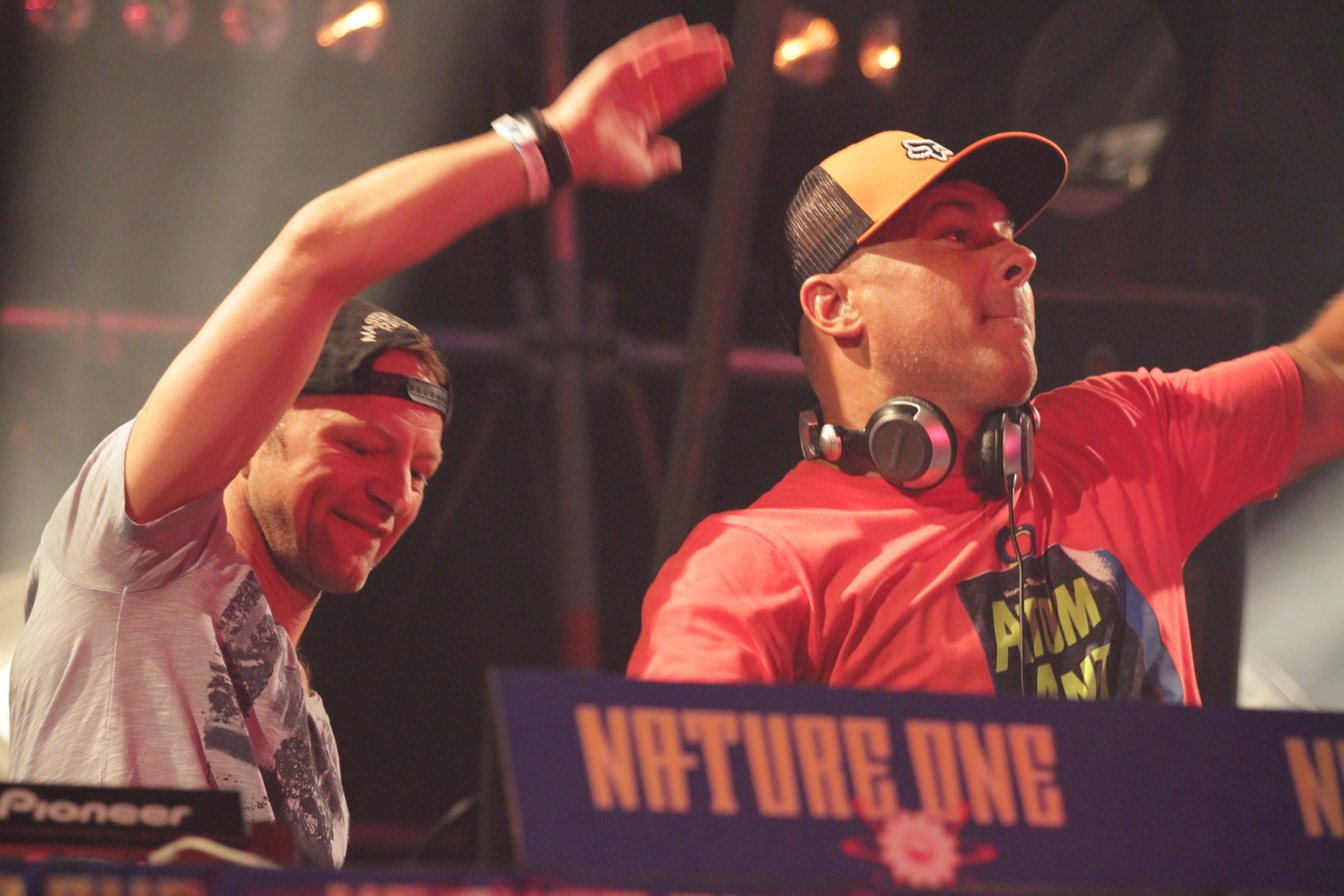
- Charlie Lownoise and Mental Theo during Nature One (2013)

Background information
- Origin: Netherlands
- Genres: Happy hardcore, Gabber, Hardcore Techno, Hardstyle, Eurodance
- Years active: 1993–2022
- Labels: Master Maximum, Polydor Records, VIP Records
- Past members: Charly Lownoise; Mental Theo

Charly Lownoise & Mental Theo were a DJ duo from the Netherlands. They are best known for their successful happy hardcore songs, but have also produced gabber & Eurodance records.

== History ==
Charly Lownoise was born as Ramon Roelofs on June 16, 1968, in The Hague in South Holland and was later member of Starsplash. Mental Theo was born Theo Nabuurs on February 14, 1965, in 's-Hertogenbosch, North Brabant. Their more popular tracks include "Wonderful Days" (which samples Help Get Me Some Help by Tony Ronald), "Stars" and "Live At London". The song "Revolution" is played after AZ scores a goal at home. They played their final show together on July 30, 2022, at the Ziggo Dome in Amsterdam.

== Discography ==
=== Albums ===
- Charlottenburg (1995) - Urban
- Old School Hardcore (1996) - Polydor
- On Air (1996) - Polydor
- Thank You Ravers (CD + DVD) (2005) - EMI Music (Netherlands)
- Speedcity - The Greatest Hits (2006) - Sony BMG Music Entertainment (Netherlands)

=== Compilations ===
- Kiss Your Sweet Ears Goodbye!! (1998) - Master Maximum Records
- Speedcity (2xCD + DVD) (2003) - BMG (Netherlands)

=== Singles ===
- "Flight to Frankfurt" (1993) - Master Maximum Records
- "Holland" (1993) - Master Maximum Records
- "Tiroler Kaboemsch" (1993) - Total Recall
- "The Bird" (1993)- Hard Stuff Records
- "Kiss the Ground" (1994) - Master Maximum Records
- "Live at London" (1994) - Master Maximum Records
- "Wonderful Days" (1994) - Polydor (Gold in Netherlands)
- "Stars" (1995) - Urban
- "The Bird" (1995) - ZYX Music
- "This Christmas" (1995) - Urban
- "Together in Wonderland" (1995) - Polydor
- "Fantasy World" (1996) - Polydor
- "Hardcore Feelings" (1996) - Polydor
- "Fantasy World / Stars" (1996) - Polydor
- "In the Mix" (1996) - Warner Special Marketing GmbH
- "Party" (1996) - Urban
- "Streetkids" (1996) - Urban
- "Your Smile" (1996) - Polydor
- "Just Can't Get Enough" (1997) - Polydor
- "Next 2 Me" (1998) - Polydor
- "Girls" (2000) - Polydor
- "Wonderful Days" (2001) - Kontor Records
- "Wonderfull Days / Is There Anybody Out There" (2001) - Bang On!
- "Speedcity Megamix" (2004) - BMG (Netherlands)
- "All I Wanna Do Is F*ck with the DJ" (2007) - Master Maximum Records
- "DJ Fuck / Tiroler Kaboemsch / Ultimate Sextrack / Verrotted" (2007) - VIP Records
- "Live at London / 1,2,3 for Germany / The Bird / Rebel" (2007) - VIP Records
- "Wonderful Days 2.08" (2007) - Master Maximum Records
- "Wonderfull Days / Wonderfull Days / Motherfuck / Speedcity" (2007) - VIP Records
- "Koning voetbal dit ek" (feat. Wesley Sneijder) (2021) - Cloud 9 Recordings
- "Last Goodbye" (2022) - Collect! Music Publishers

=== EPs ===
- Blast EP (1993) - Master Maximum Records
- Tears EP (1993) - Master Maximum Records
- Party EP (1996) - Master Maximum Trance Traxx
