= Spirit of the Blues =

Single
- B-side: "Forever Ever-ton"
- Released: 1984
- Label: Direct
- Songwriters: Billy Kinsley; Kenny Parry

"Spirit of the Blues" is a song recorded by Kinsley Music. It was released in April 1984 by Liverpool-based Direct Records ahead of the 1984 FA Cup Final.

In September 2020, the song became popular having been featured in social media memes. The origin of the meme was posted on 2 September 2020 on Twitter by user adamsg1878; it contained footage from the music video of Coldplay's "Adventure of a Lifetime" featuring chimpanzees dancing around and enjoying themselves while "Spirit of the Blues" music played. It was accompanied with the text "We're actually signing James, Allan and Doucoure".

The song reached #65 in the Official Singles Chart Top 100 and #1 in the downloads chart for 2-8 October 2020. It was re-released on vinyl on 2 October 2020 by Everton F.C. in conjunction with Cherry Red Records, with a piano version of "Z-Cars" on the B-side.

No.	Title	Writer(s)	Length
1.	"Spirit of the Blues"	Kinsley Music (Billy Kinsley, Kenny Parry)
2.	"Forever Ever-ton"	Graham Gouldman
