= List of most-downloaded songs in the United Kingdom =

Most-downloaded songs in the United Kingdom

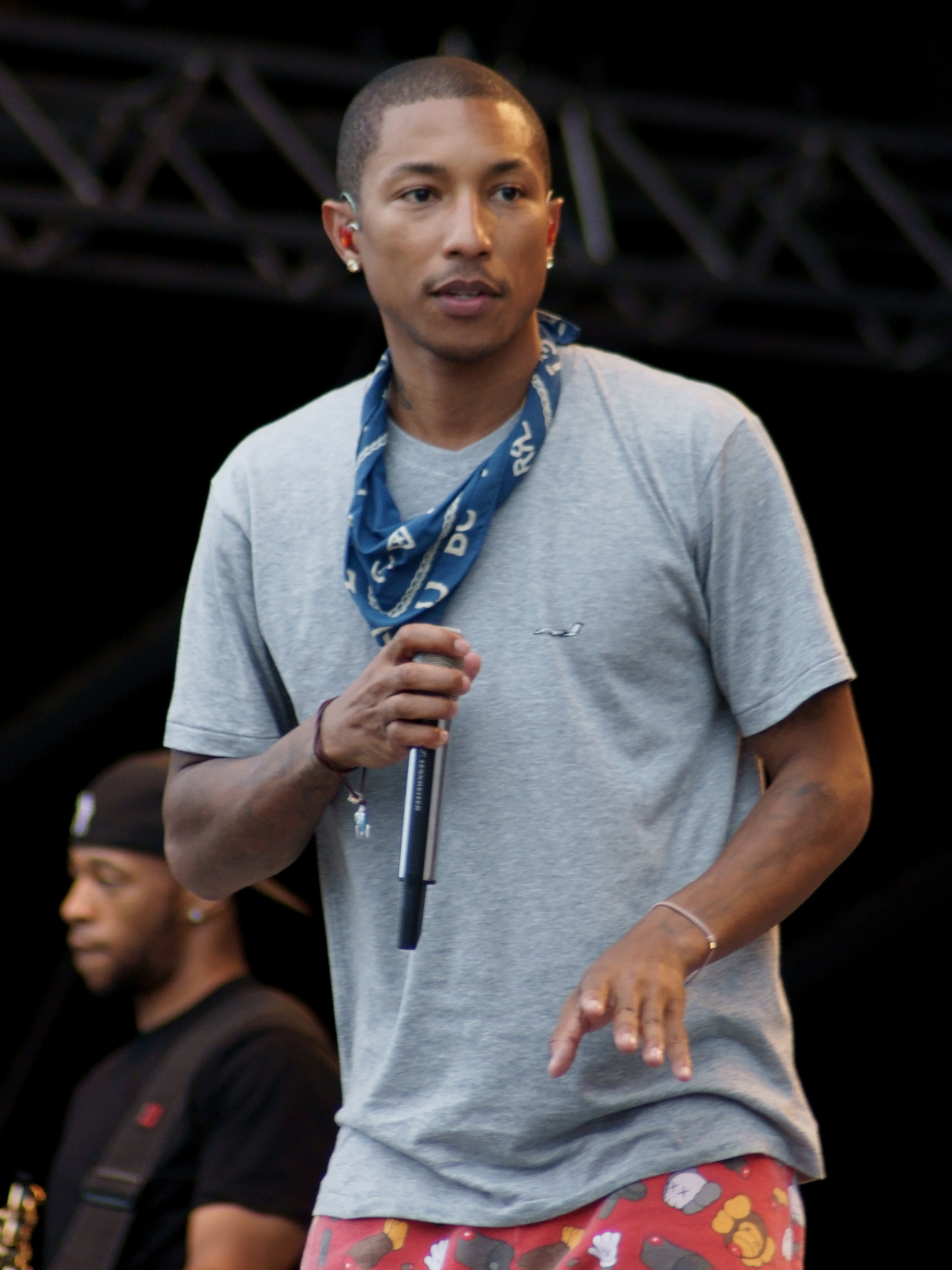
"Happy" by Pharrell Williams is the most-downloaded single in the UK

A music download is the transfer of music as a digital file from a provider (such as iTunes) to a device capable of playing it; legal sales of music downloads have been monitored and charted in the United Kingdom since 2004. As of 19 September 2017, the UK's most-downloaded song of all time is "Happy" by Pharrell Williams, which topped both the UK Singles Downloads Chart and UK Singles Chart.

The first single to sell one million downloads in the UK was "I Gotta Feeling" by The Black Eyed Peas and "Someone like You" and "Set Fire to the Rain" by Adele are the best-selling downloads by a female artist. The best-selling song not to top the UK Singles Chart is "Moves Like Jagger" by Maroon 5 featuring Christina Aguilera, whilst the best-selling song not to top the Download Chart is "Love the Way You Lie" by Eminem featuring Rihanna, which peaked at number two.

== Most-downloaded songs ==
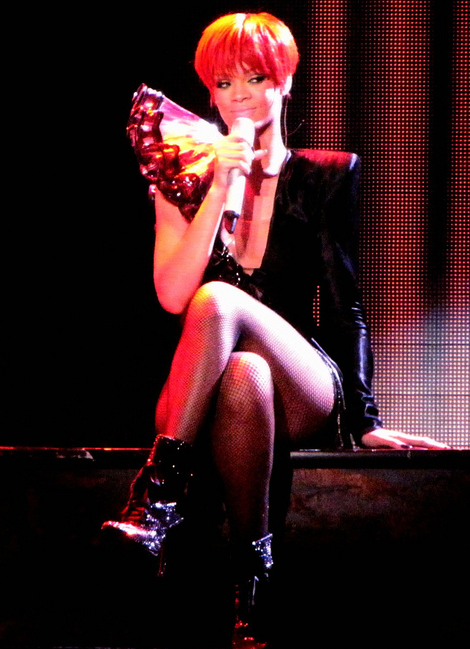
Rihanna

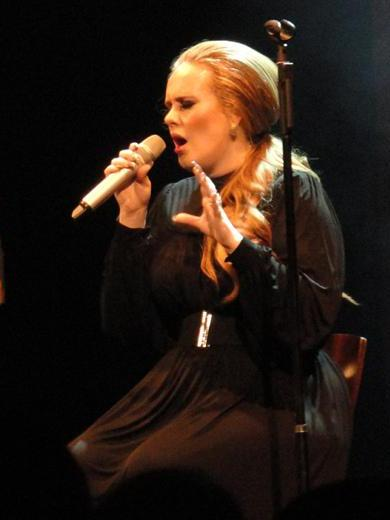
Adele

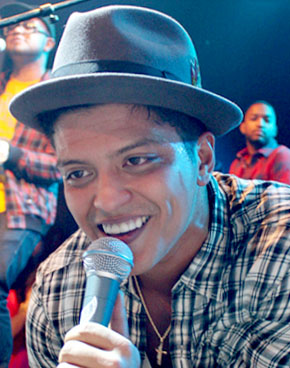
Bruno Mars

No.	Artist	Song	Record label	Year	Peak position	Copies sold (Note: As of 2017)
1	Pharrell Williams	"Happy"	Sony	2013	1	1,921,000+
2	Robin Thicke featuring T.I. and Pharrell Williams	"Blurred Lines"	Universal	2013	1	1,667,000+
3	Mark Ronson featuring Bruno Mars	"Uptown Funk"	Sony	2014	1	1,647,000+
4	Adele	"Someone Like You"	Beggars	2011	1	1,644,000+
5	Maroon 5 featuring Christina Aguilera	"Moves Like Jagger"	Universal	2011	2	1,536,000+
6	Gotye featuring Kimbra	"Somebody That I Used to Know"	Universal	2012	1	1,515,000+
7	Avicii	"Wake Me Up"	Universal	2013	1	1,483,000+
8	The Black Eyed Peas	"I Gotta Feeling"	Universal	2009	1	1,477,000+
9	Daft Punk featuring Pharrell Williams	"Get Lucky"	Sony	2013	1	1,471,000+
10	Rihanna featuring Calvin Harris	"We Found Love"	Universal	2011	1	1,415,000+
11	Kings of Leon	"Sex on Fire"	Sony BMG	2008	1	1,386,000+
12	Carly Rae Jepsen	"Call Me Maybe"	Universal	2012	1	1,358,000+
13	Bruno Mars	"Just the Way You Are"	Warner	2010	1	1,331,000+
14	Psy	"Gangnam Style"	Universal	2012	1	1,304,000+
