= Breast Cancer Research =

- Discipline: Oncology
- Language: English
- Edited by: Lewis Chodosh

Publication details
- History: 1999-present
- Publisher: BioMed Central
- Frequency: Bimonthly
- Open access: Yes
- License: Creative Commons Attribution License 4.0
- Impact factor: 8.4 (2021)

Standard abbreviations
- ISO 4: Breast Cancer Res.

Indexing
- CODEN: BCRRCT
- ISSN: 1465-5411 (print); 1465-542X (web)
- LCCN: 00-243252
- OCLC no.: 48668710

Links
- Journal homepage; Online access

Breast Cancer Research is a bimonthly peer-reviewed medical journal covering research into breast cancer. The journal was established in 1999 and is published by BioMed Central. The editor-in-chief is Lewis Chodosh (University of Pennsylvania).

== Abstracting and indexing ==
The journal is abstracted and indexed in:

- CAS
- CINAHL
- Current Contents/Clinical Medicine
- Embase
- Global Health
- MEDLINE/PubMed
- Science Citation Index
- Scopus

According to the Journal Citation Reports, the journal has a 2021 impact factor of 8.4.
