= List of best-selling music downloads of the 2000s in the United Kingdom =

Sales of music downloads in the United Kingdom have been monitored since 2004; during the 2000s, these sales were collated by the Official Charts Company and compiled weekly into the UK Official Download Chart, a record chart of the biggest-selling downloads in the UK.

In September 2009, The Daily Telegraph published a chart of what were the best-selling music downloads of the decade to that point. American singer Lady Gaga was number one with her 2009 single "Poker Face".

Several songs sold a significant amount in the final four months of the decade, after The Daily Telegraph's list was published. These songs include "Bad Boys" by Alexandra Burke, "Fight for This Love" by Cheryl Cole, and "Killing in the Name" by Rage Against the Machine, which sold more than half a million copies in one week to become the 2009 Christmas number one.

== Best-selling music downloads ==
As of 7 September 2009:

Best-selling music downloads of the 2000s in the UK
No.	Artist	Song	Record label	Year	Chart peak
1	Lady Gaga	"Poker Face"	Warner	2009	1
2	Kings of Leon	"Sex on Fire"	Sony	2008	1
3	Lady Gaga	"Just Dance"	Warner	2009	1
4	Kings of Leon	"Use Somebody"	Sony	2008	2
5	La Roux	"In for the Kill"	Warner	2009	2
6	Leona Lewis	"Run"	Sony	2008	1
7	Alexandra Burke	"Hallelujah"	Sony	2008	1
8	Leona Lewis	"Bleeding Love"	Sony	2007	1
9	Snow Patrol	"Chasing Cars"	Universal	2006	2
10	Nickelback	"Rockstar"	Warner	2007	1
11	Katy Perry	"I Kissed a Girl"	EMI	2008	1
12	Beyoncé	"If I Were a Boy"	Sony	2008	1
13	Rihanna featuring Jay-Z	"Umbrella"	Universal	2007	1
14	Take That	"Rule the World"	Universal	2007	2
15	James Morrison featuring Nelly Furtado	"Broken Strings"	Universal	2008	2
16	The Black Eyed Peas	"Boom Boom Pow"	Universal	2009	1
17	Duffy	"Mercy"	Universal	2008	1
18	Gnarls Barkley	"Crazy"	Warner	2006	1
19	Katy Perry	"Hot n Cold"	EMI	2008	4
20	Dizzee Rascal featuring Calvin Harris and Chrome	"Dance wiv Me"	Dirtee Stank	2008	1
21	Tinchy Stryder featuring N-Dubz	"Number 1"	Universal	2009	1
22	The Killers	"Human"	Universal	2008	2
23	Pink	"So What"	Sony	2008	1
24	Lily Allen	"The Fear"	EMI	2009	1
25	Estelle featuring Kanye West	"American Boy"	Warner	2008	1
26	Flo Rida featuring T-Pain	"Low"	Warner	2008	2
27	Sam Sparro	"Black and Gold"	Universal	2008	2
28	Timbaland presents OneRepublic	"Apologize"	Universal	2007	1
29	Girls Aloud	"The Promise"	Universal	2008	1
30	Mika	"Grace Kelly"	Universal	2007	1
31	The Black Eyed Peas	"I Gotta Feeling"	Universal	2009	1
32	Mark Ronson featuring Amy Winehouse	"Valerie"	Sony	2007	2
33	Rihanna	"Disturbia"	Universal	2008	2
34	Coldplay	"Viva la Vida"	EMI	2008	1
35	Dizzee Rascal & Armand Van Helden	"Bonkers"	Dirtee Stank	2009	1
36	Flo Rida featuring Ke$ha	"Right Round"	Universal	2009	1
37	Madonna featuring Justin Timberlake	"4 Minutes"	Warner	2008	1
38	Sugababes	"About You Now"	Universal	2007	1
39	A. R. Rahman and The Pussycat Dolls featuring Nicole Scherzinger	"Jai Ho! (You Are My Destiny)"	Universal	2009	3
40	Calvin Harris	"I'm Not Alone"	Sony	2009	1
