= Mental Theo =

Dutch DJ and producer (born 1965)

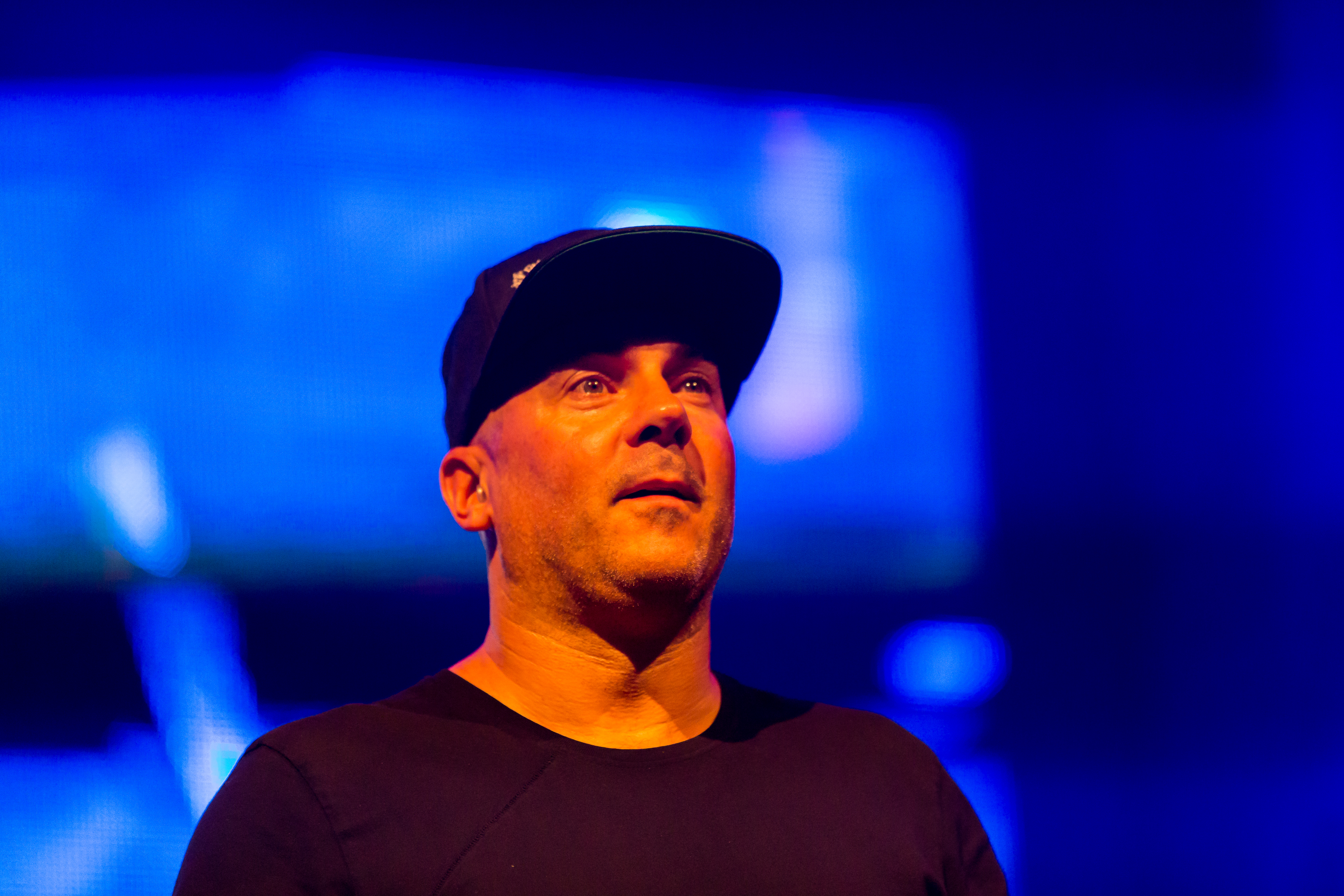
- Mental Theo performing in Mannheim on 29 November 2015

Background information
- Born: Theodorus Josephus Jan Nabuurs; 14 February 1965 (age 61) 's-Hertogenbosch, Netherlands
- Genres: Electronic dance music
- Occupations: Record producer; DJ

Theodorus Josephus Jan Nabuurs (born 14 February 1965), better known by his stage name Mental Theo is a Dutch record producer and DJ. He has recorded two studio albums: Back Once Again (2005) and Jumpstyle Madness (2007). He also performs in duo with Charly Lownoise.

== Career ==
Mental Theo was born in 's-Hertogenbosch, Netherlands. In 2005 his first solo studio album Back Once Again was released. The album peaked at number 61 on the Dutch albums chart. In 2006 Mental Theo re-recorded "Boten Anna" by Basshunter and it was released under the name "Now You're Gone" and alias Bazzheadz. The single charted at number 18 on the Danish singles chart. Initially Basshunter tried to translate "Boten Anna" to English for few times but it was impossible to translate so in 2007 he made his version of "Now You're Gone" featuring DJ Mental Theo. Single was released on 29 December 2007. It was the initial release for Hard2Beat Records label (later Dance Nation). The single charted at number 1 in the United Kingdom, where it stayed at the top for five weeks. It was the first Swedish song at number one on British list since "Dancing Queen" by ABBA. It sold an excess 667,000 copies in the United Kingdom and was certified platinum. It also charted on UK Top 100 Songs of the Decade. "Now You're Gone" also stayed at the top for five weeks in Ireland, made it to number 2 on the Swedish chart, and number 3 in New Zealand (single was certified platinum). On the French singles chart, "Now You're Gone" peaked at number 6. "Now You're Gone" also charted at number 4 on the European Hot 100 Singles. His 2007 second solo studio album Jumpstyle Madness charted at number 51 on the Dutch albums chart. The next single "Say You'll Stay" with Bazzheadz alias was released in 2008 and reached number 21 on the Dutch singles chart.

== Discography ==
=== Albums ===
==== Studio albums ====
List of studio albums with selected chart positions
Title	Album details	Peak chart positions
Title	Album details	NLD
Back Once Again	Released: 2005; Label: BMG The Netherlands; Format: CD	61
Jumpstyle Madness	Released: 2007; Label: Sony BMG Music Entertainment; Format: CD	51

==== Compilation albums ====
List of compilation albums with selected chart positions
Title	Album details	Peak chart positions
Title	Album details	NLD
On the Road	Released: 2004; Label: BMG Netherlands; Format: CD	18

=== Singles ===
==== As lead artist ====
List of singles as lead artist with selected chart positions
Title	Year	Peak chart positions		
Title	Year	NLD	DEN	GER
"Air" (vs. DJ C7)	2000	—	—	—
"Revolution / Pump My Eardrumz"	2001	—	—	—
"Stars 2001"	2001	—	—	—
"Stars 2002"	2002	49	—	44
"Revolution"	2002	57	—	71
"Think of You"	2005	53	—	—
"Revolution 2005 / Every Step"	2005	42	—	—
"Now You're Gone" (Note: As Bazzheadz.)	2006	—	18	—
"Jawzz"	2007	82	—	—
"Say You'll Stay" (presents Bazzheadz feat. Sebastian Westwood)	2008	21	—	—
"This Is Vegas Baby"	2013	—	—	—
"Sunburn"	2013	—	—	—
"We Kick a Hole in Your Speaker"	2013	—	—	—
"I'm Gonna Live Tonight"	2014	—	—	—
"Raving Beats" (& DJ Paul Elstak feat. Gin Dutch)	2014	74	—	—
"La puta madre"	2014	—	—	—
"Brain Confusion"	2015	—	—	—
"Woow"	2015	—	—	—
"Bonzai"	2016	—	—	—
"Overrule Stay Alive"	2017	—	—	—
"Party Hard"	2017	—	—	—
"Hard Punch" (& Matt Lucker)	2018	—	—	—
"Koning van het feest" (& Nigel Sean)	2018	—	—	—
"Bau Shi Bau" (& Nigel Sean)	2018	—	—	—
"Bella ciao"	2018	—	—	—
"Tonight" (& Zany)	2018	—	—	—
"Shallow"	2019	—	—	—
"Bella ciao (Remix)"	2019	—	—	—
"DJ Rebel Live at London" (Dr. Peacock)	2019	—	—	—
"Your Smile (Kane Scott Remix)"	2020	—	—	—
"Pink Soldiers"	2021	—	—	—
"—" denotes a recording that did not chart or was not released in that country.

=== As featured artist ===
List of singles as featured artist, with selected chart positions, certifications and album name
Title	Year	Peak chart positions										Sales	Certifications	Album
Title	Year	SWE	AUT	DEN	FIN	FRA	GER	IRL	NOR	NZL	UK	Sales	Certifications	Album
"Now You're Gone" (Basshunter)	2007	2	14	14	8	6	18	1	10	3	1	UK: 667,000	BPI: 2× Platinum; IFPI DEN: Gold; RMNZ: Platinum	Now You're Gone – The Album
