= List of UK top-ten singles in 2015 =

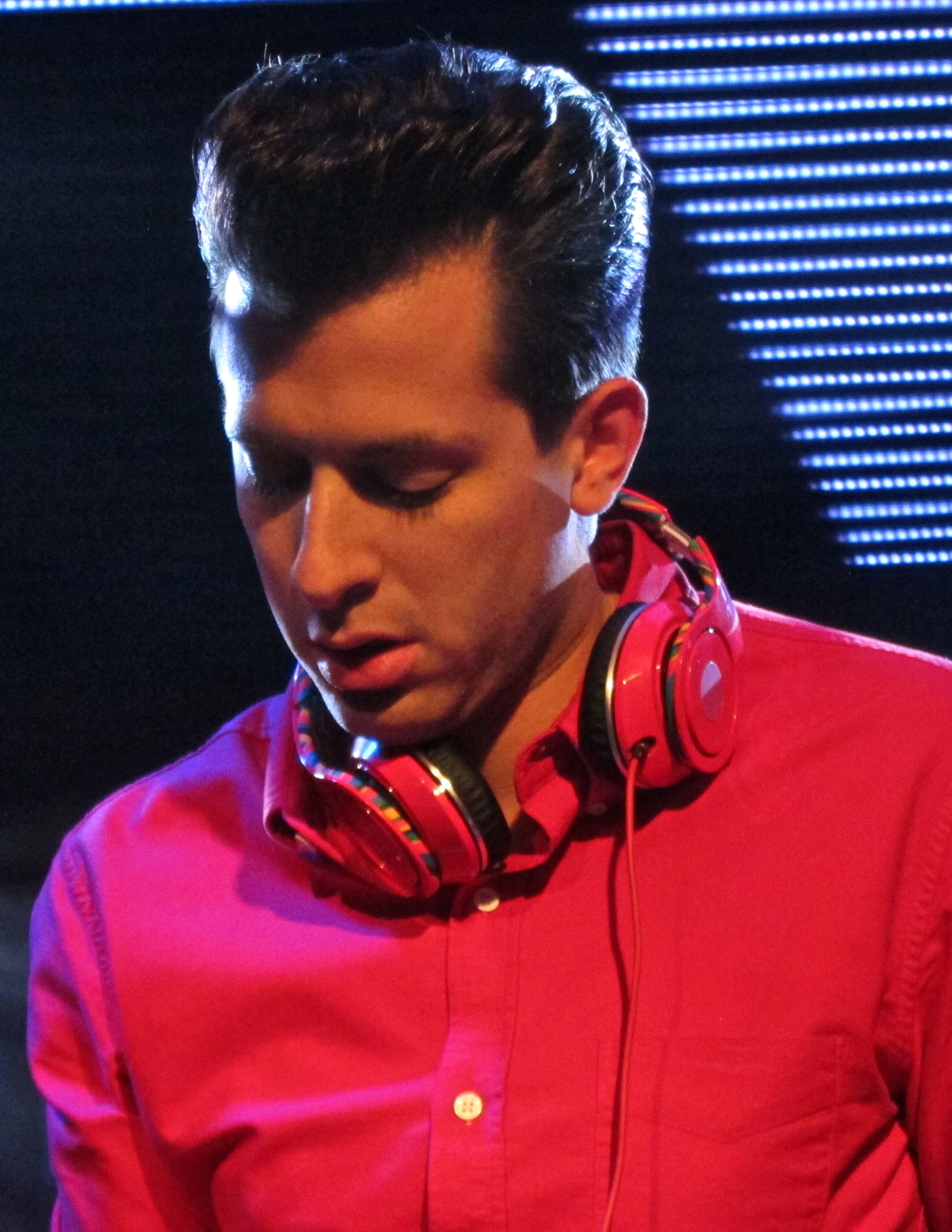
Mark Ronson's "Uptown Funk", a collaboration with Bruno Mars, became the best-selling single of 2015. The song entered the charts at number-one in December 2014 and lasted 18 weeks in the top 10, seven of which were at the top spot.

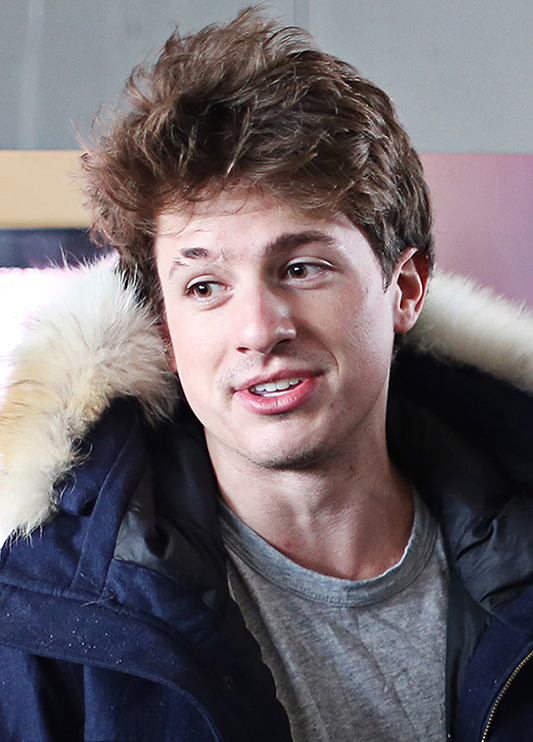
Charlie Puth made his UK top 10 debut this year, achieving two number-one singles: "See You Again" (with Wiz Khalifa) and "Marvin Gaye" (with Meghan Trainor). "See You Again" was recorded as a tribute to actor Paul Walker, who died in a car accident in November 2013, and featured on the soundtrack of the movie Furious 7, in which Walker posthumously appeared.

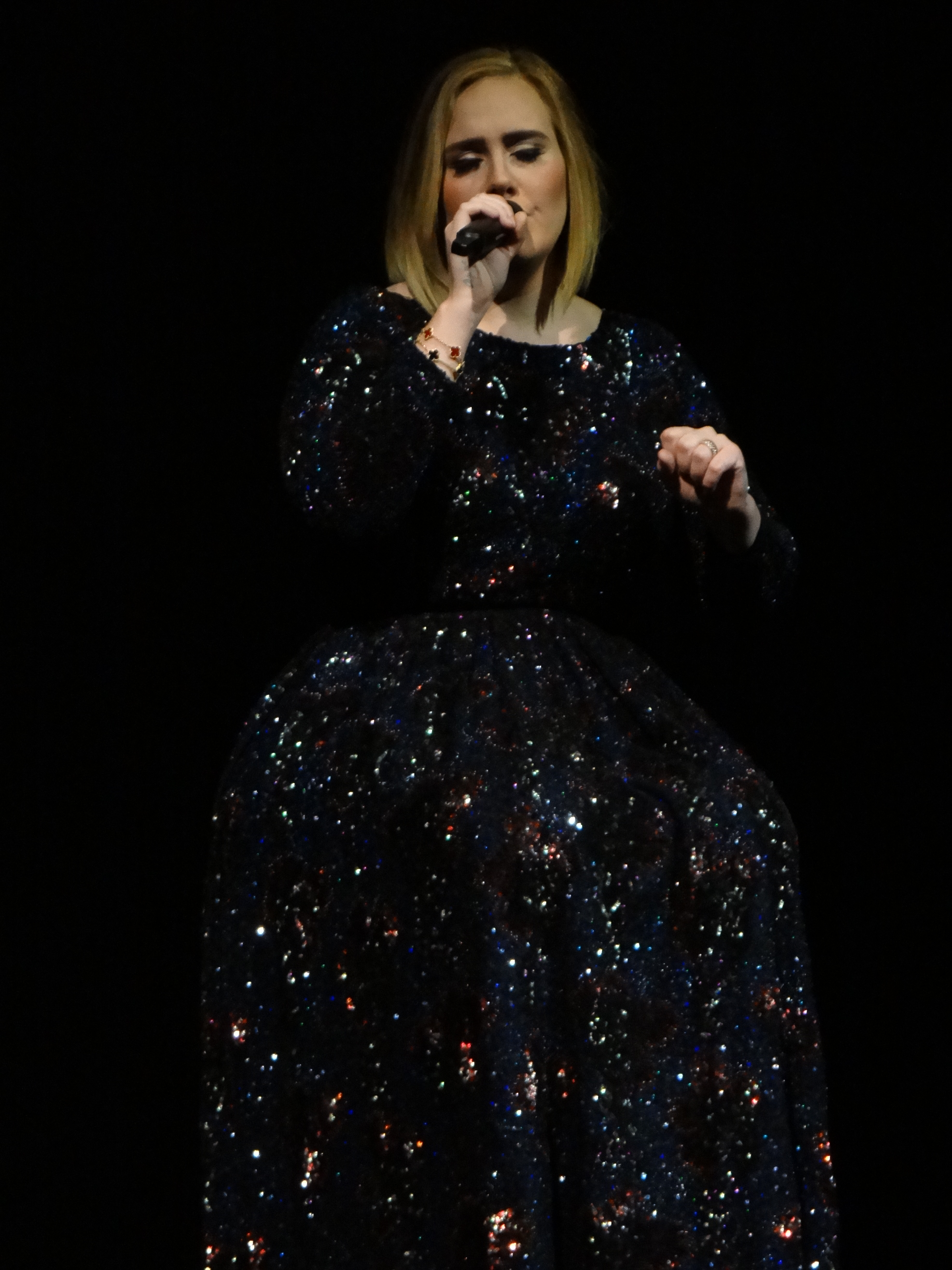
Adele returned to the UK charts in 2015 with "Hello", which spent three weeks at number-one and lasted 14 weeks in the top 10. It ended up as the year's sixth best selling single.

The UK Singles Chart is one of many music charts compiled by the Official Charts Company that calculates the best-selling singles of the week in the United Kingdom. Since 2004, the chart has been based on the sales of both physical singles and digital downloads, with airplay figures excluded from the official chart. From 6 July 2014, streaming figures became incorporated into the singles chart which means that a song will count as a sale, if streamed 100 times. This list shows singles that peaked in the Top 10 of the UK Singles Chart during 2015, as well as singles which peaked in 2014 and 2016 but were in the top 10 in 2015. The entry date is when the song appeared in the top 10 for the first time (week ending, as published by the Official Charts Company, which is six days after the chart is announced).

One-hundred and fifteen singles were in the top ten in 2015. Eight singles from 2014 remained in the top 10 for several weeks at the beginning of the year, while "History" by One Direction was released in 2015 but did not reach its peak until 2016. Eighteen artists scored multiple entries in the top 10 in 2015. Charlie Puth, Fifth Harmony, Hozier, Kygo, Lost Frequencies, The Weeknd and Zara Larsson were among the many artists who achieved their first UK charting top 10 single in 2015.

The Christmas number one – "A Bridge Over You" by the Lewisham and Greenwich NHS Choir – set the record for the biggest drop from number-one, falling to number 29 on its second week on the chart, and only the fourth number-one single in history to leave the top 10 after one week.

"Uptown Funk" by British record producer Mark Ronson and American singer-songwriter Bruno Mars returned to number-one for the first six weeks of 2015, giving the song a total of seven weeks on top of the chart. The song had vacated the top spot for one week as the X Factor series 11 winner Ben Haenow secured the 2014 Christmas number one with "Something I Need". The first new number-one single of the year was "Love Me like You Do" by British singer Ellie Goulding, taken from the soundtrack of the film Fifty Shades of Grey. Overall, twenty-four different singles peaked at number-one in 2015, with Jess Glynne and Justin Bieber (3) having the joint most singles hit that position.

== Background ==
=== Multiple entries ===
One-hundred and fifteen singles charted in the top 10 in 2015, with one-hundred and four singles reaching their peak this year.

Eighteen artists scored multiple entries in the top 10 in 2009. Jess Glynne and Justin Bieber shared the record for most top 10 hits in 2015 with four hit singles each.

=== Sharpest fall from number-one ===
“A Bridge Over You” by Lewisham and Greenwich NHS Choir - 2015's Christmas number-one - set an unwanted record as it suffered the steepest drop from the top spot in chart history. The week after topping the chart it fell to number 29, making way for Justin Bieber's "Love Yourself" to reclaim the number-one position. It remained a record until July 2018, when “Three Lions” by Baddiel, Skinner & The Lightning Seeds fell 96 places from the number-one position. It was also the first single to suffer this fate since "Baby's Coming Back"/"Transylvania" by McFly in 2007.

=== Chart debuts ===
Sixty-seven artists achieved their first top 10 single in 2015, either as a lead or featured artist. Of these, five went on to record another hit single that year: Charlie Puth, Galantis, James Bay, Philip George and Sigala. The Weeknd had two other entries in his breakthrough year.

The following table (collapsed on desktop site) does not include acts who had previously charted as part of a group and secured their first top 10 solo single.

| Artist | Number of top 10s | First entry | Chart position | Other entries |
|---|---|---|---|---|
| Philip George | 2 | "Wish You Were Mine" | 2 | "Alone No More" (4) |
| Hozier | 1 | "Take Me to Church" | 2 | — |
| Tchami | 1 | "Promesses" | 7 | — |
| Kaleem Taylor | 1 | "Promesses" | 7 | — |
| Karen Harding | 1 | "Say Something" | 7 | — |
| Mike Mago | 1 | "Outlines" | 8 | — |
| Dragonette | 1 | "Outlines" | 8 | — |
| The Weeknd | 3 | "Earned It" | 4 | "Can't Feel My Face" (3), "The Hills" (3) |
| James Bay | 2 | "Hold Back the River" | 2 | "Let It Go" (10) |
| Marlon Roudette | 1 | "When the Beat Drops Out" | 7 | — |
| Sage the Gemini | 1 | "G.D.F.R." | 3 | — |
| Lookas | 1 | "G.D.F.R." | 3 | — |
| Nick Jonas | 1 | "Jealous" | 2 | — |
| Stevie McCrorie | 1 | "Lost Stars" | 6 | — |
| Charlie Puth | 2 | "See You Again" | 1 | "Marvin Gaye" (1) |
| Omi | 1 | "Cheerleader" | 1 | — |
| Dr. Kucho! | 1 | "Can't Stop Playing (Makes Me High)" | 4 | — |
| Gregor Salto | 1 | "Can't Stop Playing (Makes Me High)" | 4 | — |
| Ane Brun | 1 | "Can't Stop Playing (Makes Me High)" | 4 | — |
| Kygo | 1 | "Firestone" | 8 | — |
| Conrad Sewell | 1 | "Firestone" | 8 | — |
| Major Lazer | 1 | "Lean On" | 2 | — |
| DJ Snake | 1 | "Lean On" | 2 | — |
| MØ | 1 | "Lean On" | 2 | — |
| Jennifer Hudson | 1 | "Trouble" | 7 | — |
| Roy English | 1 | "Cool" | 10 | — |
| Jack Ü | 1 | "Where Are Ü Now" | 3 | — |
| Alex Newell | 1 | "All Cried Out" | 4 | — |
| LunchMoney Lewis | 1 | "Bills" | 2 | — |
| Galantis | 2 | "Runaway (U & I)" | 4 | "Peanut Butter Jelly" (8) |
| Kendrick Lamar | 1 | "Bad Blood" | 4 | — |
| Natalie La Rose | 1 | "Somebody" | 2 | — |
| Walk the Moon | 1 | "Shut Up and Dance" | 4 | — |
| Deorro | 1 | "Five More Hours" | 4 | — |
| Fetty Wap | 1 | "Trap Queen" | 8 | — |
| Lost Frequencies | 1 | "Are You with Me" | 1 | — |
| Krept and Konan | 1 | "Freak of the Week" | 9 | — |
| David Zowie | 1 | "House Every Weekend" | 1 | — |
| Fifth Harmony | 1 | "Worth It" | 3 | — |
| Kid Ink | 1 | "Worth It" | 3 | — |
| Birdy | 1 | "Wings" | 8 | — |
| Sam Feldt | 1 | "Show Me Love" | 4 | — |
| Kimberly Anne | 1 | "Show Me Love" | 4 | — |
| Disciples | 1 | "How Deep Is Your Love" | 2 | — |
| Martin Solveig | 1 | "Intoxicated" | 5 | — |
| GTA | 1 | "Intoxicated" | 5 | — |
| Rachel Platten | 1 | "Fight Song" | 1 | — |
| Felix Jaehn | 1 | "Ain't Nobody (Loves Me Better)" | 2 | — |
| Jasmine Thompson | 1 | "Ain't Nobody (Loves Me Better)" | 2 | — |
| Sigala | 2 | "Easy Love" | 1 | "Sweet Lovin'" (3) |
| R. City | 1 | "Locked Away" | 2 | — |
| Pia Mia | 1 | "Do It Again" | 8 | — |
| Arrow Benjamin | 1 | "Runnin' (Lose It All)" | 4 | — |
| Anton Powers | 1 | "Alone No More" | 4 | — |
| Jamie Lawson | 1 | "Wasn't Expecting That" | 6 | — |
| KDA | 1 | "Turn the Music Louder (Rumble)" | 1 | — |
| Sleepy Tom | 1 | "Be Right There" | 8 | — |
| Zara Larsson | 1 | "Never Forget You" | 5 | — |
| Fleur East | 1 | "Sax" | 3 | — |
| WSTRN | 1 | "In2" | 4 | — |
| Grace | 1 | "You Don't Own Me" | 4 | — |
| G-Eazy | 1 | "You Don't Own Me" | 4 | — |
| Bryn Christopher | 1 | "Sweet Lovin'" | 3 | — |
| Stormzy | 1 | "Shut Up" | 8 | — |
| Louisa Johnson | 1 | "Forever Young" | 9 | — |
| Lewisham and Greenwich NHS Choir | 1 | "A Bridge over You" | 1 | — |

Notes

Jack Ü is made up of Skrillex and Diplo. Skrillex had not recorded a top 10 single before but Diplo was featured on "Earthquake" by DJ Fresh. Alex Newell was an uncredited vocalist on Clean Bandit's "Stronger" (charted 2 May 2015). Nick Jonas relaunched his solo career in 2014 and had his first top 10 charting single, "Jealous", outside Jonas Brothers in 2015. The group had never reached the top 10; the closest they came was with "S.O.S" in 2008 which peaked at number 13.

=== Songs from films ===
Original songs from various films entered the top 10 throughout the year. These included "Earned It" and "Love Me Like You Do" (from Fifty Shades of Grey), "See You Again" (Furious 7), "Elastic Heart" (The Hunger Games: Catching Fire), "Lost Stars" (Begin Again, covered by Stevie McCrorie) and "Writing's on the Wall" (Spectre).

=== Best-selling singles ===
Mark Ronson & Bruno Mars had the best-selling single of the year with "Uptown Funk". The song spent 18 weeks in the top 10 (including seven weeks at number 1), sold around 1.76 million copies (including streams) and was certified 4× platinum by the BPI. "Cheerleader" by Omi came in second place, selling more than 1.52 million and losing out by around 240,000 sales. Hozier's "Take Me to Church", "Love Me Like You Do from Ellie Goulding and "See You Again" by Wiz Khalifa featuring Charlie Puth made up the top five. Singles by Adele, Major Lazer & DJ Snake featuring MØ, James Bay and Justin Bieber ("What Do You Mean?" and "Sorry") were also in the top 10 best-selling singles of 2015.

== Top-ten singles ==
Key

| Symbol | Meaning |
|---|---|
| ‡ | Single peaked in 2014 but still in chart in 2015. |
| ♦ | Single released in 2015 but peaked in 2016. |
| (#) | Year-end top-ten single and rank |
| Entered | The date that the single first appeared in the chart. |
| Peak | Highest position that the single reached in the UK Singles Chart. |

| Entered (week ending) | Weeks in top 10 | Single | Artist | Peak | Peak reached (week ending) | Weeks at peak |
Singles in 2014
| 11 October 2014 | 12 | "All About That Bass" ‡ | Meghan Trainor | 1 | 11 October 2014 | 4 |
| 18 October 2014 | 20 | "Thinking Out Loud" ‡ | Ed Sheeran | 1 | 8 November 2014 | 2 |
| 15 November 2014 | 7 | "Outside" ‡ | Calvin Harris featuring Ellie Goulding | 6 | 15 November 2014 | 2 |
| 22 November 2014 | 2 | "Like I Can" ‡ ^{[A]} | Sam Smith | 9 | 22 November 2014 | 1 |
| 29 November 2014 | 5 | "Wrapped Up" ‡ ^{[B]} | Olly Murs featuring Travie McCoy | 3 | 29 November 2014 | 1 |
| 29 November 2014 | 10 | "Blank Space" ‡ | Taylor Swift | 4 | 13 December 2014 | 2 |
| 6 December 2014 | 6 | "These Days" ‡ | Take That | 1 | 6 December 2014 | 1 |
| 20 December 2014 | 18 | "Uptown Funk" ‡ (#1) | Mark Ronson featuring Bruno Mars | 1 | 20 December 2014 | 7 |
| 27 December 2014 | 6 | "Something I Need" ‡ | Ben Haenow | 1 | 27 December 2014 | 1 |
| 27 December 2014 | 7 | "Up" ‡ | Olly Murs featuring Demi Lovato | 4 | 27 December 2014 | 3 |
Singles in 2015
| 3 January 2015 | 5 | "Heroes (We Could Be)" | Alesso featuring Tove Lo | 6 | 3 January 2015 | 1 |
| 10 January 2015 | 6 | "Wish You Were Mine" | Philip George | 2 | 10 January 2015 | 3 |
| 10 January 2015 | 15 | "Take Me to Church" (#3) | Hozier | 2 | 7 February 2015 | 4 |
| 17 January 2015 | 2 | "Promesses" | Tchami featuring Kaleem Taylor | 7 | 17 January 2015 | 1 |
| 31 January 2015 | 3 | "Lips Are Movin" | Meghan Trainor | 2 | 31 January 2015 | 1 |
| 31 January 2015 | 5 | "The Nights" | Avicii | 6 | 14 February 2015 | 1 |
| 7 February 2015 | 2 | "L.A. Love (La La)" | Fergie | 3 | 7 February 2015 | 1 |
| 7 February 2015 | 11 | "FourFiveSeconds" | Rihanna, Kanye West & Paul McCartney | 3 | 14 March 2015 | 2 |
| 7 February 2015 | 1 | "Say Something" | Karen Harding | 7 | 7 February 2015 | 1 |
| 14 February 2015 | 9 | "Love Me like You Do" (#4) | Ellie Goulding | 1 | 14 February 2015 | 4 |
| 14 February 2015 | 1 | "Outlines" | Mike Mago & Dragonette | 8 | 14 February 2015 | 1 |
| 21 February 2015 | 2 | "Gravity" | DJ Fresh featuring Ella Eyre | 4 | 21 February 2015 | 1 |
| 21 February 2015 | 2 | "Ayo" ^{[C]} | Chris Brown & Tyga | 6 | 21 February 2015 | 1 |
| 21 February 2015 | 2 | "Doing It" | Charli XCX featuring Rita Ora | 8 | 21 February 2015 | 1 |
| 21 February 2015 | 7 | "Earned It" | The Weeknd | 4 | 28 February 2015 | 2 |
| 28 February 2015 | 11 | "Sugar" ^{[D]} | Maroon 5 | 7 | 28 February 2015 | 3 |
| 7 March 2015 | 1 | "What I Did for Love" | David Guetta featuring Emeli Sandé | 6 | 7 March 2015 | 1 |
| 7 March 2015 | 2 | "Heartbeat Song" | Kelly Clarkson | 7 | 7 March 2015 | 1 |
| 7 March 2015 | 8 | "Hold Back the River" (#8) | James Bay | 2 | 4 April 2015 | 1 |
| 14 March 2015 | 8 | "King" | Years & Years | 1 | 14 March 2015 | 1 |
| 14 March 2015 | 1 | "When the Beat Drops Out" | Marlon Roudette | 7 | 14 March 2015 | 1 |
| 21 March 2015 | 3 | "Lay Me Down" ^{[O]} | Sam Smith featuring John Legend | 1 | 21 March 2015 | 2 |
| 21 March 2015 | 2 | "G.D.F.R." | Flo Rida featuring Sage the Gemini & Lookas | 3 | 21 March 2015 | 1 |
| 21 March 2015 | 1 | "I Don't Mind" | Usher featuring Juicy J | 8 | 21 March 2015 | 1 |
| 4 April 2015 | 9 | "Hold My Hand" | Jess Glynne | 1 | 4 April 2015 | 3 |
| 11 April 2015 | 3 | "Bloodstream" | Ed Sheeran & Rudimental | 2 | 11 April 2015 | 1 |
| 11 April 2015 | 1 | "Elastic Heart" | Sia | 10 | 11 April 2015 | 1 |
| 18 April 2015 | 4 | "Jealous" | Nick Jonas | 2 | 18 April 2015 | 1 |
| 18 April 2015 | 1 | "Lost Stars" | Stevie McCrorie | 6 | 18 April 2015 | 1 |
| 25 April 2015 | 10 | "See You Again" (#5) | Wiz Khalifa featuring Charlie Puth | 1 | 25 April 2015 | 2 |
| 25 April 2015 | 17 | "Cheerleader" (#2) ^{[E]} | Omi | 1 | 9 May 2015 | 4 |
| 25 April 2015 | 2 | "Can't Stop Playing (Makes Me High)" | Dr Kucho! & Gregor Salto featuring Ane Brun | 4 | 25 April 2015 | 1 |
| 25 April 2015 | 5 | "Firestone" | Kygo featuring Conrad Sewell | 8 | 2 May 2015 | 3 |
| 2 May 2015 | 1 | "Stronger" | Clean Bandit | 4 | 2 May 2015 | 1 |
| 2 May 2015 | 12 | "Lean On" (#7) ^{[F]} | Major Lazer & DJ Snake featuring MØ | 2 | 27 June 2015 | 1 |
| 9 May 2015 | 4 | "I Really Like You" | Carly Rae Jepsen | 3 | 9 May 2015 | 2 |
| 9 May 2015 | 2 | "Trouble" | Iggy Azalea featuring Jennifer Hudson | 7 | 9 May 2015 | 1 |
| 9 May 2015 | 1 | "Cool" | Alesso featuring Roy English | 10 | 9 May 2015 | 1 |
| 16 May 2015 | 2 | "All Cried Out" | Blonde featuring Alex Newell | 4 | 16 May 2015 | 1 |
| 16 May 2015 | 7 | "Where Are Ü Now" | Jack Ü with Justin Bieber | 3 | 6 June 2015 | 1 |
| 23 May 2015 | 5 | "Bills" | LunchMoney Lewis | 2 | 23 May 2015 | 1 |
| 23 May 2015 | 7 | "Runaway (U & I)" | Galantis | 4 | 23 May 2015 | 1 |
| 30 May 2015 | 3 | "Bad Blood" | Taylor Swift featuring Kendrick Lamar | 4 | 30 May 2015 | 1 |
| 30 May 2015 | 5 | "Hey Mama" | David Guetta featuring Nicki Minaj, Bebe Rexha & Afrojack | 9 | 27 June 2015 | 1 |
| 6 June 2015 | 6 | "Want to Want Me" | Jason Derulo | 1 | 6 June 2015 | 4 |
| 6 June 2015 | 1 | "Don't Look Down" | Martin Garrix featuring Usher | 9 | 6 June 2015 | 1 |
| 13 June 2015 | 2 | "Somebody" | Natalie La Rose featuring Jeremih | 2 | 13 June 2015 | 1 |
| 20 June 2015 | 13 | "Shut Up and Dance" | Walk the Moon | 4 | 4 July 2015 | 2 |
| 27 June 2015 | 2 | "Five More Hours" | Deorro X Chris Brown | 4 | 27 June 2015 | 1 |
| 27 June 2015 | 3 | "Trap Queen" | Fetty Wap | 8 | 27 June 2015 | 2 |
| 4 July 2015 | 4 | "Not Letting Go" | Tinie Tempah featuring Jess Glynne | 1 | 4 July 2015 | 1 |
| 4 July 2015 | 10 | "Are You with Me" | Lost Frequencies | 1 | 9 July 2015 | 1 |
| 4 July 2015 | 2 | "I Don't Like It, I Love It" | Flo Rida featuring Robin Thicke & Verdine White | 7 | 4 July 2015 | 2 |
| 9 July 2015 | 2 | "Poison" | Rita Ora | 3 | 9 July 2015 | 1 |
| 9 July 2015 | 2 | "Freak of the Week" | Krept and Konan featuring Jeremih | 9 | 9 July 2015 | 2 |
| 16 July 2015 | 4 | "House Every Weekend" | David Zowie | 1 | 16 July 2015 | 1 |
| 16 July 2015 | 7 | "Shine" | Years & Years | 2 | 16 July 2015 | 3 |
| 16 July 2015 | 2 | "Worth It" | Fifth Harmony featuring Kid Ink | 3 | 16 July 2015 | 1 |
| 16 July 2015 | 1 | "Wings" | Birdy | 8 | 16 July 2015 | 1 |
| 16 July 2015 | 1 | "Let It Go" | James Bay | 10 | 16 July 2015 | 1 |
| 23 July 2015 | 7 | "Black Magic" | Little Mix | 1 | 23 July 2015 | 3 |
| 23 July 2015 | 4 | "Show Me Love" | Sam Feldt featuring Kimberly Anne | 4 | 23 July 2015 | 1 |
| 23 July 2015 | 2 | "Waiting for Love" | Avicii | 6 | 23 July 2015 | 1 |
| 30 July 2015 | 1 | "Come and Get It" | John Newman | 5 | 30 July 2015 | 1 |
| 30 July 2015 | 12 | "How Deep Is Your Love" | Calvin Harris & Disciples | 2 | 13 August 2015 | 2 |
| 6 August 2015 | 4 | "Glitterball" | Sigma featuring Ella Henderson | 4 | 6 August 2015 | 1 |
| 13 August 2015 | 2 | "Drag Me Down" | One Direction | 1 | 13 August 2015 | 1 |
| 13 August 2015 | 9 | "Can't Feel My Face" | The Weeknd | 3 | 20 August 2015 | 2 |
| 20 August 2015 | 6 | "Marvin Gaye" | Charlie Puth featuring Meghan Trainor | 1 | 20 August 2015 | 1 |
| 27 August 2015 | 7 | "Don't Be So Hard on Yourself" | Jess Glynne | 1 | 27 August 2015 | 1 |
| 27 August 2015 | 4 | "Intoxicated" ^{[G]} | Martin Solveig & GTA | 5 | 27 August 2015 | 1 |
| 3 September 2015 | 5 | "Fight Song" | Rachel Platten | 1 | 3 September 2015 | 1 |
| 3 September 2015 | 4 | "Ain't Nobody (Loves Me Better)" | Felix Jaehn featuring Jasmine Thompson | 2 | 3 September 2015 | 1 |
| 10 September 2015 | 22 | "What Do You Mean?" (#9) | Justin Bieber | 1 | 10 September 2015 | 5 |
| 10 September 2015 | 2 | "Cool for the Summer" | Demi Lovato | 7 | 10 September 2015 | 1 |
| 17 September 2015 | 6 | "Easy Love" | Sigala | 1 | 17 September 2015 | 1 |
| 17 September 2015 | 3 | "Peanut Butter Jelly" | Galantis | 8 | 17 September 2015 | 2 |
| 1 October 2015 | 5 | "Locked Away" | R. City featuring Adam Levine | 2 | 15 October 2015 | 2 |
| 1 October 2015 | 5 | "On My Mind" | Ellie Goulding | 5 | 15 October 2015 | 1 |
| 1 October 2015 | 4 | "Do It Again" | Pia Mia featuring Chris Brown & Tyga | 8 | 8 October 2015 | 1 |
| 8 October 2015 | 6 | "Writing's on the Wall" ^{[H]} | Sam Smith | 1 | 8 October 2015 | 1 |
| 8 October 2015 | 6 | "Runnin' (Lose It All)" | Naughty Boy featuring Beyoncé & Arrow Benjamin | 4 | 22 October 2015 | 1 |
| 15 October 2015 | 1 | "Alone No More" | Philip George & Anton Powers | 4 | 15 October 2015 | 1 |
| 15 October 2015 | 6 | "Hotline Bling" | Drake | 3 | 22 October 2015 | 2 |
| 22 October 2015 | 7 | "The Hills" ^{[J]} | The Weeknd | 3 | 29 October 2015 | 1 |
| 22 October 2015 | 3 | "Wasn't Expecting That" | Jamie Lawson | 6 | 22 October 2015 | 1 |
| 29 October 2015 | 4 | "Turn the Music Louder (Rumble)" | KDA featuring Tinie Tempah & Katy B | 1 | 29 October 2015 | 1 |
| 29 October 2015 | 4 | "Perfect" ^{[I]} | One Direction | 2 | 29 October 2015 | 1 |
| 29 October 2015 | 1 | "Be Right There" | Diplo & Sleepy Tom | 8 | 29 October 2015 | 1 |
| 5 November 2015 | 14 | "Hello" (#6) | Adele | 1 | 5 November 2015 | 3 |
| 5 November 2015 | 18 | "Sorry" (#10) | Justin Bieber | 1 | 26 November 2015 | 2 |
| 12 November 2015 | 7 | "Never Forget You" ^{[K]} | Zara Larsson & MNEK | 5 | 19 November 2015 | 1 |
| 12 November 2015 | 1 | "Focus" | Ariana Grande | 10 | 12 November 2015 | 1 |
| 19 November 2015 | 7 | "Sax" ^{[L]} | Fleur East | 3 | 19 November 2015 | 1 |
| 19 November 2015 | 4 | "In2" | WSTRN | 4 | 19 November 2015 | 1 |
| 26 November 2015 | 17 | "Love Yourself" | Justin Bieber | 1 | 10 December 2015 | 6 |
| 26 November 2015 | 4 | "Take Me Home" ^{[P]} | Jess Glynne | 6 | 26 November 2015 | 1 |
| 3 December 2015 | 1 | "Over and Over Again" | Nathan Sykes | 8 | 3 December 2015 | 1 |
| 10 December 2015 | 7 | "You Don't Own Me" | Grace featuring G-Eazy | 4 | 24 December 2015 | 1 |
| 17 December 2015 | 7 | "Sweet Lovin'" | Sigala featuring Bryn Christopher | 3 | 17 December 2015 | 1 |
| 17 December 2015 | 6 | "Adventure of a Lifetime" | Coldplay | 7 | 24 December 2015 | 1 |
| 24 December 2015 | 2 | "Shut Up" | Stormzy | 8 | 24 December 2015 | 1 |
| 24 December 2015 | 1 | "Forever Young" | Louisa Johnson | 9 | 24 December 2015 | 1 |
| 31 December 2015 | 1 | "A Bridge over You" | Lewisham and Greenwich NHS Choir | 1 | 31 December 2015 | 1 |
| 31 December 2015 | 8 | "History" ♦ | One Direction | 6 | 21 January 2016 | 3 |

== Entries by artist ==
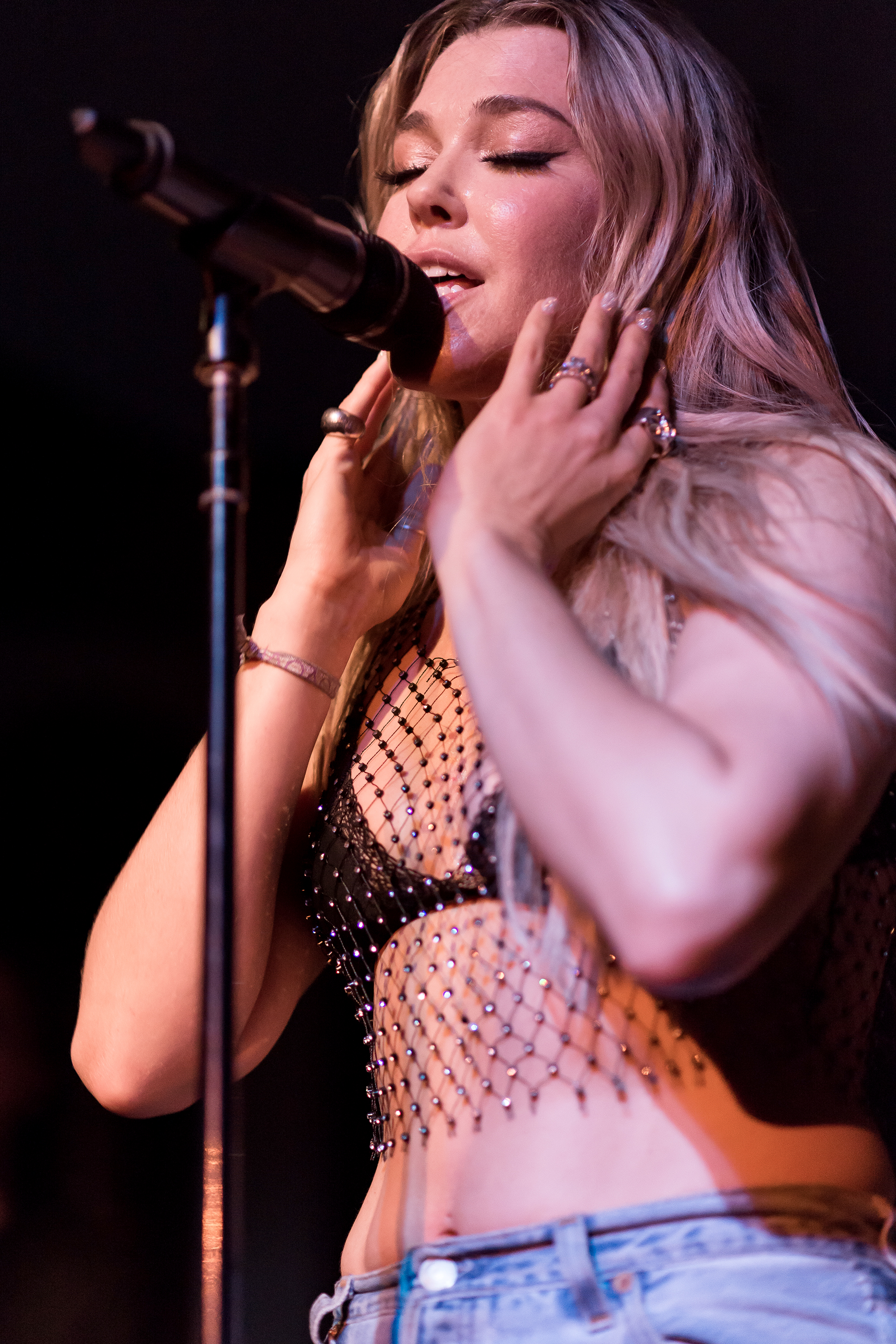
Rachel Platten became a one-hit wonder in the UK charts this year with "Fight Song", which spent one week at number-one.

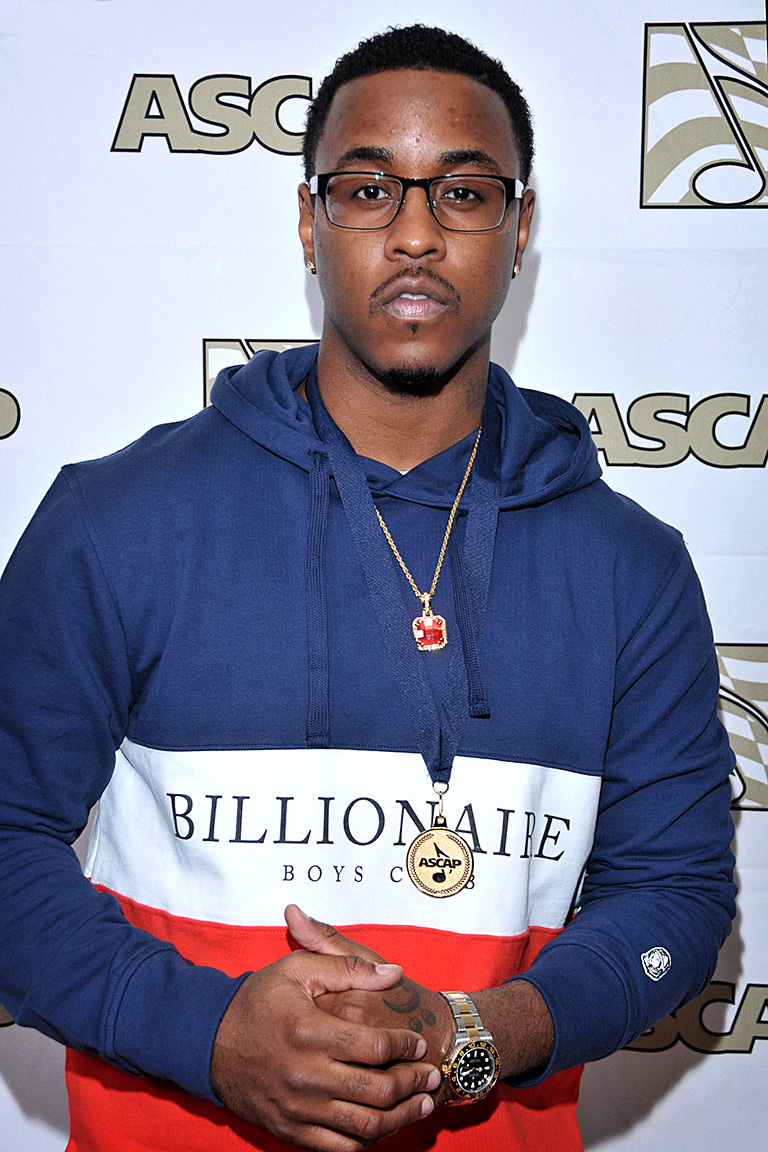
American rapper and singer Jeremih provided guest vocals on Natalie La Rose's hit single "Somebody", which reached number two in the UK in June 2015.

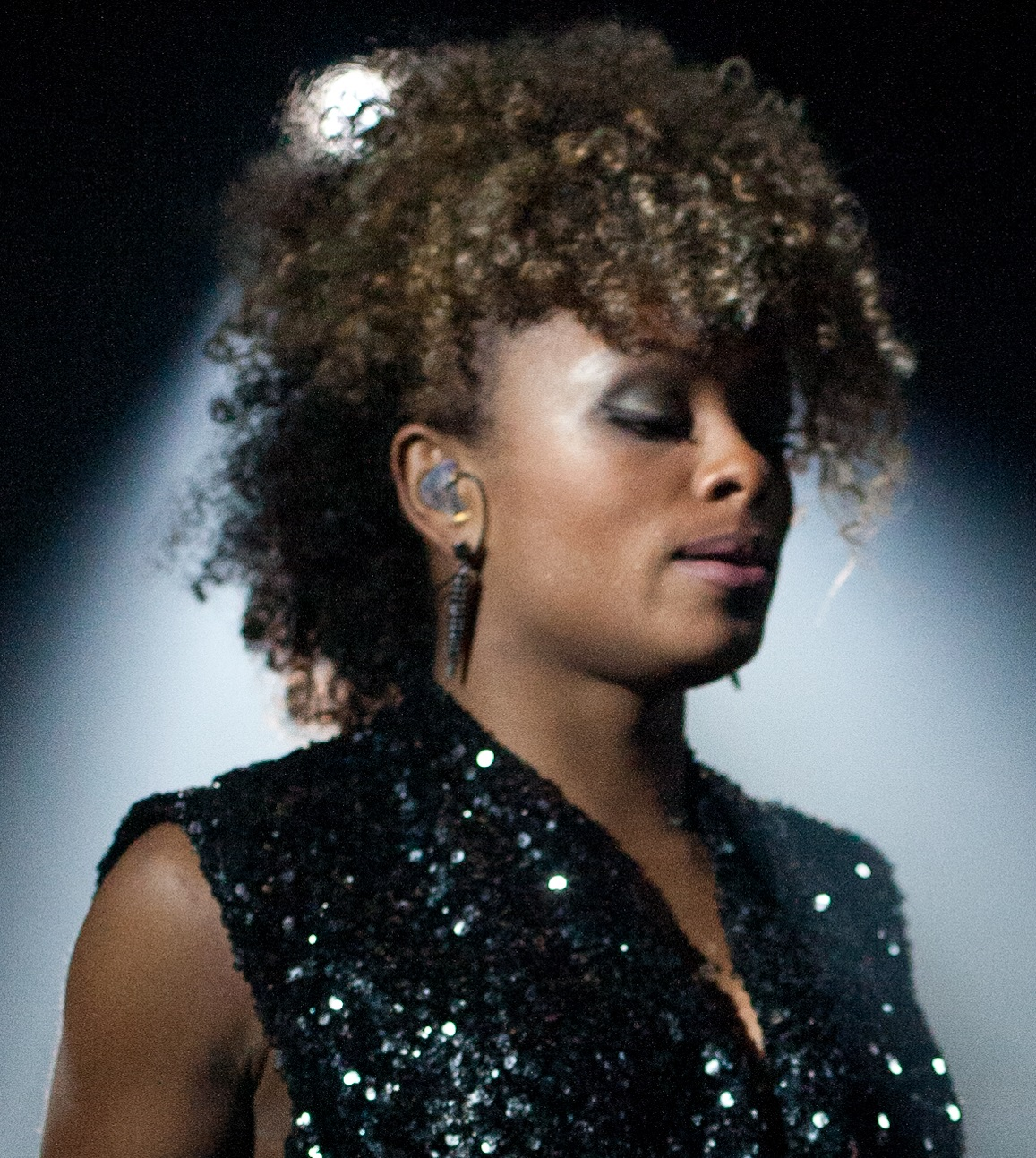
Fleur East, who finished as the runner-up of the 10th series of The X Factor, reached number three in November of this year with her debut single "Sax", which lasted six weeks in the top 10.

The following table shows artists who achieved two or more top 10 entries in 2015, including singles that reached their peak in 2014 or 2016. The figures include both main artists and featured artists, while appearances on ensemble charity records are also counted for each artist. The total number of weeks an artist spent in the top ten in 2015 is also shown.

| Entries | Artist | Weeks | Singles |
|---|---|---|---|
| 4 | Jess Glynne ^{[Q]} | 24 | "Don't Be So Hard on Yourself", "Hold My Hand", "Not Letting Go", "Take Me Home" |
| 4 | Justin Bieber | 50 | "Love Yourself", "Sorry", "What Do You Mean?", "Where Are Ü Now" |
| 3 | Chris Brown ^{[R]} | 8 | "Ayo", "Do It Again", "Five More Hours" |
| 3 | Diplo ^{[M]} | 21 | "Be Right There", "Lean On", "Where Are Ü Now" |
| 3 | Ellie Goulding ^{[AA]} | 15 | "Love Me Like You Do", "On My Mind", "Outside" |
| 3 | Meghan Trainor ^{[S]}^{[AA]} | 12 | "All About That Bass", "Lips Are Movin", "Marvin Gaye" |
| 3 | One Direction ^{[BB]} | 7 | "Drag Me Down", "History", "Perfect" |
| 3 | Sam Smith ^{[AA]} | 10 | "Lay Me Down", "Like I Can", "Writing's on the Wall" |
| 3 | The Weeknd | 24 | "Can't Feel My Face", "Earned It", "The Hills" |
| 2 | Adam Levine ^{[N]}^{[T]} | 16 | "Locked Away", "Sugar" |
| 2 | Alesso | 6 | "Cool", "Heroes (We Could Be)" |
| 2 | Avicii | 7 | "The Nights", "Waiting for Love" |
| 2 | Calvin Harris | 13 | "How Deep Is Your Love", "Outside" |
| 2 | Charlie Puth ^{[U]} | 16 | "Marvin Gaye", "See You Again" |
| 2 | David Guetta | 6 | "Hey Mama", "What I Did for Love" |
| 2 | Demi Lovato ^{[V]}^{[AA]} | 8 | "Cool for the Summer", "Up" |
| 2 | Ed Sheeran ^{[AA]} | 12 | "Bloodstream", "Thinking Out Loud" |
| 2 | Flo Rida | 4 | "G.D.F.R.", "I Don't Like It, I Love It" |
| 2 | Galantis | 10 | "Peanut Butter Jelly", "Runaway (U & I)" |
| 2 | James Bay | 9 | "Hold Back the River", "Let It Go" |
| 2 | Jeremih ^{[W]} | 4 | "Freak of the Week", "Somebody" |
| 2 | Olly Murs ^{[AA]} | 7 | "Up", "Wrapped Up" |
| 2 | Philip George | 7 | "Alone No More", "Wish You Were Mine" |
| 2 | Rita Ora ^{[X]} | 4 | "Doing It", "Poison" |
| 2 | Sigala | 10 | "Easy Love", "Sweet Lovin'" |
| 2 | Taylor Swift ^{[AA]} | 8 | "Bad Blood", "Blank Space" |
| 2 | Tinie Tempah ^{[Y]} | 8 | "Not Letting Go", "Turn the Music Louder (Rumble)" |
| 2 | Tyga ^{[R]} | 6 | "Ayo", "Do It Again" |
| 2 | Usher ^{[Z]} | 2 | "Don't Look Down", "I Don't Mind" |
| 2 | Years & Years | 15 | "King", "Shine" |

== See also ==
- 2015 in British music
- List of UK Singles Chart number ones of the 2010s
