= List of UK Singles Sales Chart number ones =

The UK Singles Sales Chart is a weekly record chart compiled by the Official Charts Company (OCC) on behalf of the British record industry. The UK Singles Sales Chart differs from the UK Singles Chart (also known as the Official Singles Chart) in that it counts "physical" sales only (including downloads), whereas the Official Chart also counts streaming. Since 10 July 2015, the chart week has run from Friday to Thursday with the chart-date given as the following Thursday; prior to this, the chart week ran from Sunday to Saturday, with the chart date given as the following Saturday.

It was announced in June 2014 that as of Sunday, 29 June, audio streams from streaming media services would be counted towards the Official Singles Chart to better reflect changes in music consumption in the United Kingdom after a year-on-year doubling from 100 million to 200 million weekly streams from the previous year. The UK Singles Sales Chart uses the previous methodology, and as a result did not face the criticism the UK Singles Chart faced in 2016 when there were no new entries in the top 49 and in 2017 when Ed Sheeran's ÷ occupied sixteen of the top twenty places in the chart.

== Number-one singles ==
Key
No.	nth single to top the UK Singles Chart
re	Return of a single to number one

No.	Artist (Note: The artist, single, date of reaching number one and number of weeks at number one are those given by the Official Charts Company.)	Single	Record label (Note: The record labels are those given by the OCC.)	Week ending date	Source(s)
2014
1	Ariana Grande featuring Iggy Azalea	"Problem"	Republic	12 July 2014	
2	will.i.am featuring Cody Wise	"It's My Birthday"	Interscope	19 July 2014	
3	Rixton	"Me and My Broken Heart"	Interscope	26 July 2014	
4	Cheryl Cole featuring Tinie Tempah	"Crazy Stupid Love"	Polydor	2 August 2014	
5	Magic!	"Rude"	RCA	9 August 2014	
6	Nico & Vinz	"Am I Wrong"	EMI, Warner Bros.	16 August 2014	
7	David Guetta featuring Sam Martin	"Lovers on the Sun"	Parlophone	30 August 2014	
8	Lilly Wood and Robin Schulz	"Prayer in C"	Warner Music	6 September 2014	
9	Calvin Harris featuring John Newman	"Blame"	Columbia	20 September 2014	
10	Sigma featuring Paloma Faith	"Changing"	3Beat	27 September 2014	
11	Jessie J, Ariana Grande and Nicki Minaj	"Bang Bang"	Republic	4 October 2014	
12	Meghan Trainor	"All About That Bass"	Epic	11 October 2014	
13	Ed Sheeran	"Thinking Out Loud"	Atlantic	8 November 2014	
14	Cheryl	"I Don't Care"	Polydor	15 November 2014	
15	Gareth Malone's All Star Choir	"Wake Me Up"	Decca	22 November 2014	
16	Band Aid 30	"Do They Know It's Christmas?"	Virgin EMI, Universal Music	29 November 2014	
17	Take That	"These Days"	Polydor	6 December 2014	
18	Union J	"You Got It All"	Epic	13 December 2014	
19	Mark Ronson featuring Bruno Mars	"Uptown Funk"	Sony	20 December 2014	
20	Ben Haenow	"Something I Need"	Syco	27 December 2014	
2015
re	Mark Ronson featuring Bruno Mars	"Uptown Funk"	Sony	3 January 2015	
21	Ellie Goulding	"Love Me like You Do"	Polydor	14 February 2015	
22	Years & Years	"King"	Polydor	14 March 2015	
23	Sam Smith featuring John Legend	"Lay Me Down"	Capitol	21 March 2015	
24	Jess Glynne	"Hold My Hand"	Warner Music	4 April 2015	
25	Nick Jonas	"Jealous"	Island	18 April 2015	
26	Wiz Khalifa featuring Charlie Puth	"See You Again"	Atlantic	25 April 2015	
27	OMI	"Cheerleader"	Oufah	16 May 2015	
28	Lunchmoney Lewis	"Bills"	Kemosabe	23 May 2015	
re	OMI	"Cheerleader"	Oufah	30 May 2015	
29	Jason Derulo	"Want to Want Me"	Warner Bros.	6 June 2015	
30	Deorro vs. Chris Brown	"Five More Hours"	Relentless	27 June 2015	
31	Tinie Tempah featuring Jess Glynne	"Not Letting Go"	Parlophone	4 July 2015	
32	Lost Frequencies	"Are You with Me"	AATW	9 July 2015	
33	David Zowie	"House Every Weekend"	Positiva	16 July 2015	
34	Little Mix	"Black Magic"	Syco	23 July 2015	
35	Sigma ft. Ella Henderson	"Glitterball"	3 Beat	6 August 2015	
36	One Direction	"Drag Me Down"	Syco	13 August 2015	
37	Charlie Puth featuring Meghan Trainor	"Marvin Gaye"	Atlantic	20 August 2015	
38	Jess Glynne	"Don't Be So Hard on Yourself"	Warner Music	27 August 2015	
39	Rachel Platten	"Fight Song"	Columbia	3 September 2015	
40	Justin Bieber	"What Do You Mean?"	Def Jam	10 September 2015	
41	Sigala	"Easy Love"	Ministry of Sound	17 September 2015	
re	Justin Bieber	"What Do You Mean?"	Def Jam	1 October 2015	
42	Sam Smith	"Writing's on the Wall"	Capitol	8 October 2015	
43	Anton Powers & Philip George	"Alone No More"	3 Beat	15 October 2015	
44	Jamie Lawson	"Wasn't Expecting That"	Gingerbread Man	22 October 2015	
45	KDA featuring Tinie Tempah and Katy B	"Turn the Music Louder (Rumble)"	Ministry of Sound	29 October 2015	
46	Adele	"Hello"	XL Recordings	5 November 2015	
47	Justin Bieber	"Love Yourself"	Def Jam	10 December 2015	
48	Lewisham and Greenwich NHS Choir	"A Bridge over You"	EmuBands	31 December 2015	
2016
re	Justin Bieber	"Love Yourself"	Def Jam	7 January 2016	
49	Shawn Mendes	"Stitches"	Island	21 January 2016	
50	Jonas Blue ft. Dakota	"Fast Car"	Positiva	4 February 2016	
51	ZAYN	"Pillowtalk"	RCA	11 February 2016	
52	Lukas Graham	"7 Years"	Warner Bros.	18 February 2016	
53	Mike Posner	"I Took a Pill in Ibiza"	Island	24 March 2016	
54	Sigala ft. DJ Fresh & Imani Williams	"Say You Do"	Ministry of Sound	31 March 2016	
re	Mike Posner	"I Took a Pill in Ibiza"	Island	7 April 2016	
55	Drake featuring Wizkid and Kyla	"One Dance"	Cash Money, Republic	21 April 2016	
56	Calvin Harris featuring Rihanna	"This Is What You Came For"	Columbia	12 May 2016	
57	Justin Timberlake	"Can't Stop the Feeling"	RCA	26 May 2016	
58	Kungs ft. Cookin' on 3 Burners	"This Girl"	3 Beat	23 June 2016	
59	Jonas Blue ft. JP Cooper	"Perfect Strangers"	Positiva	21 July 2016	
60	Calum Scott	"Dancing on My Own"	Instrumental	28 July 2016	
61	Major Lazer featuring Justin Bieber and MØ	"Cold Water"	Because Music	4 August 2016	
62	DJ Snake featuring Justin Bieber	"Let Me Love You"	Interscope	18 August 2016	
63	The Chainsmokers featuring Halsey	"Closer"	Columbia	8 September 2016	
64	James Arthur	"Say You Won't Let Go"	Columbia	29 September 2016	
65	Little Mix	"Shout Out to My Ex"	Syco	27 October 2016	
66	Clean Bandit featuring Sean Paul and Anne-Marie	"Rockabye"	Warner Music	17 November 2016	
67	Matt Terry	"When Christmas Comes Around"	Syco	22 December 2016	
68	Rag'n'Bone Man	"Human"	Columbia	29 December 2016	
2017
re	Clean Bandit ft. Anne-Marie & Sean Paul	"Rockabye"	Atlantic	5 January 2017	
re	Rag'n'Bone Man	"Human"	Columbia	12 January 2017	
69	Ed Sheeran	"Shape of You"	Atlantic	19 January 2017	
70	Ed Sheeran	"How Would You Feel (Paean)"	Atlantic	2 March 2017	
re	Ed Sheeran	"Shape of You"	Atlantic	9 March 2017	
71	Ed Sheeran	"Galway Girl"	Atlantic	30 March 2017	
72	Clean Bandit ft. Zara Larsson	"Symphony"	Atlantic, Epic	6 April 2017	
73	Harry Styles	"Sign of the Times"	Columbia	20 April 2017	
re	Clean Bandit featuring Zara Larsson	"Symphony"	Atlantic, Epic	4 May 2017	
74	DJ Khaled featuring Justin Bieber, Quavo, Chance the Rapper and Lil Wayne	"I'm the One"	We the Best, Epic	11 May 2017	
75	Luis Fonsi and Daddy Yankee featuring Justin Bieber	"Despacito (Remix)"	Republic	18 May 2017	
76	Ariana Grande	"One Last Time"	Republic	15 June 2017	
re	Luis Fonsi and Daddy Yankee featuring Justin Bieber	"Despacito (Remix)"	Republic	22 June 2017	
77	Artists for Grenfell	"Bridge over Troubled Water"	Syco	29 June 2017	
re	Luis Fonsi and Daddy Yankee featuring Justin Bieber	"Despacito (Remix)"	Republic	13 July 2017	
78	P!nk	"What About Us"	RCA	24 August 2017	
79	Taylor Swift	"Look What You Made Me Do"	Big Machine	7 September 2017	
80	Sam Smith	"Too Good at Goodbyes"	Capitol	21 September 2017	
81	Camila Cabello featuring Young Thug	"Havana"	Epic, Syco	19 October 2017	
82	Rita Ora	"Anywhere"	Atlantic	22 November 2017	
83	Ed Sheeran	"Perfect"	Asylum, Atlantic	14 December 2017	
2018
84	Eminem featuring Ed Sheeran	"River"	Asylum	25 January 2018	
85	Sigrid	"Strangers"	Island	1 February 2018	
86	Rudimental featuring Jess Glynne, Macklemore and Dan Caplen	"These Days"	Asylum	15 February 2018	
87	George Ezra	"Paradise"	Columbia	29 March 2018	
88	Keala Settle	"This Is Me"	Atlantic	12 April 2018	
89	Ruti Olajugbagbe	"Dreams"	Polydor	19 April 2018	
90	Calvin Harris and Dua Lipa	"One Kiss"	Columbia	26 April 2018	
91	Ariana Grande	"No Tears Left to Cry"	Republic	3 May 2018	
re	Calvin Harris and Dua Lipa	"One Kiss"	Columbia	10 May 2018	
92	Jess Glynne	"I'll Be There"	Warner Music	7 June 2018	
93	Tom Walker	"Leave a Light On"	Relentless	21 June 2018	
94	Clean Bandit featuring Demi Lovato	"Solo"	Atlantic	28 June 2018	
95	George Ezra	"Shotgun"	Columbia	5 July 2018	
96	Baddiel, Skinner and The Lightning Seeds	"Three Lions"	Epic	19 July 2018	
re	George Ezra	"Shotgun"	Columbia	26 July 2018	
97	Drake	"In My Feelings"	Cash Money, Republic	16 August 2018	
re	George Ezra	"Shotgun"	Columbia	23 August 2018	
98	Calvin Harris ft. Sam Smith	"Promises"	Columbia	30 August 2018	
99	Lady Gaga and Bradley Cooper	"Shallow"	Interscope	18 October 2018	
100	Ariana Grande	"Thank U, Next"	Republic	15 November 2018	
101	P!nk	"A Million Dreams"	Atlantic	29 November 2018	
102	Ava Max	"Sweet But Psycho"	Atlantic	6 December 2018	
103	Dalton Harris ft. James Arthur	"The Power of Love"	Columbia	13 December 2018	
104	Mark Ronson ft. Miley Cyrus	"Nothing Breaks Like a Heart"	Syco	20 December 2018	
105	LadBaby	"We Built This City"	Frtyfve	27 December 2018	
2019
106	Ava Max	"Sweet But Psycho"	Atlantic	10 January 2019	
107	Ariana Grande	"7 Rings"	Republic	31 January 2019	
108	Sam Smith & Normani	"Dancing With a Stranger"	Capitol	7 February 2019	
109	Calvin Harris & Rag'n'Bone Man	"Giant"	Columbia	14 February 2019	
110	P!nk	"Walk Me Home"	RCA	7 March 2019	
re	Calvin Harris & Rag'n'Bone Man	"Giant"	Columbia	14 March 2019	
111	Lewis Capaldi	"Someone You Loved"	EMI	11 April 2019	
112	RSPB	"Let Nature Sing"	RSPB	9 May 2019	
113	Lewis Capaldi	"Hold Me While You Wait"	EMI	16 May 2019	
114	Ed Sheeran & Justin Bieber	"I Don't Care"	Asylum	23 May 2019	
115	Shawn Mendes and Camila Cabello	"Señorita"	EMI	5 July 2019	
116	Lil Nas X	"Old Town Road"	Columbia	12 July 2019	
re	Shawn Mendes and Camila Cabello	"Señorita"	EMI	19 July 2019	
117	Kygo ft. Whitney Houston	"Higher Love"	Columbia	22 August 2019	
118	Ariana Grande, Miley Cyrus, Lana Del Rey	"Don't Call Me Angel"	Polydor/RCA/Republic	26 September 2019	
119	Regard	"Ride It"	Ministry of Sound	3 October 2019	
120	Tones & I	"Dance Monkey"	Bad Batch	10 October 2019	
121	The X Factor Celebrities	"Run"	Syco Music	12 December 2019	
re	Tones & I	"Dance Monkey"	Bad Batch	19 December 2019	
122	LadBaby	"I Love Sausage Rolls"	Frtyfve	26 December 2019	
2020
re	Tones & I	"Dance Monkey"	Bad Batch	2 January 2020	
123	Lewis Capaldi	"Before You Go"	EMI	9 January 2020	
re	Tones & I	"Dance Monkey"	Bad Batch	16 January 2020	
124	The Weeknd	"Blinding Lights"	Republic	23 January 2020	
re	Lewis Capaldi	"Before You Go"	EMI	6 February 2020	
re	The Weeknd	"Blinding Lights"	Republic	13 February 2020	
125	Billie Eilish	"No Time to Die"	Interscope	27 February 2020	
126	BTS	"On"	Bighit Entertainment	5 March 2020	
127	Lady Gaga	"Stupid Love"	Interscope	12 March 2020	
re	The Weeknd	"Blinding Lights"	Republic	19 March 2020	
128	Matt Lucas	"Thank You Baked Potato"	Loudmouth	16 April 2020	
re	The Weeknd	"Blinding Lights"	Republic	23 April 2020	
129	Michael Ball, Captain Tom Moore and The NHS Voices of Care Choir	"You'll Never Walk Alone"	Decca Records	30 April 2020	
130	Live Lounge Allstars	"Times Like These (BBC Radio 1 Stay At Home)"	BBC, Columbia	7 May 2020	
re	The Weeknd	"Blinding Lights"	Republic	21 May 2020	
131	Lady Gaga & Ariana Grande	"Rain on Me"	Interscope	4 June 2020	
132	Jawsh 685 & Jason Derulo	"Savage Love (Laxed – Siren Beat)"	RCA	2 July 2020	
133	Joel Corry ft. MNEK	"Head & Heart"	Asylum/Perfect Havoc	30 July 2020	
134	Nathan Dawe ft. KSI	"Lighter"	Atlantic/Warner	6 August 2020	
135	Gareth Malone's Great British Home Chorus	"You Are My Sunshine"	Decca	13 August 2020	
re	Nathan Dawe ft. KSI	"Lighter"	Atlantic/Warner	20 August 2020	
136	BTS	"Dynamite"	Big Hit Entertainment	3 September 2020	
137	Miley Cyrus	"Midnight Sky"	RCA	17 September 2020	
138	Sigala & James Arthur	"Lasting Lover"	RCA	1 October 2020	
139	Everton FC	"Spirit of the Blues"	Direct	8 October 2020	
re	Miley Cyrus	"Midnight Sky"	RCA	15 October 2020	
re	Joel Corry ft. MNEK	"Head & Heart"	Asylum/Perfect Havoc	29 October 2020	
140	KSI ft. Craig David and Digital Farm Animals	"Really Love"	BMG	5 November 2020	
141	Paul Harvey and BBC Philharmonic	"Four Notes – Paul's Tune"	Redrocca	12 November 2020	
142	BBC Children in Need	"Stop Crying Your Heart Out"	Decca	26 November 2020	
143	BTS	"Life Goes On"	Bighit Entertainment	3 December 2020	
144	Liam Gallagher	"All You're Dreaming Of"	Warner Bros.	10 December 2020	
145	Mental As Anything	"Live It Up"	Epic Records	17 December 2020	
146	Rock Choir/Vocal Group/Caroline Redman Lusher	"Keeping the Dream Alive"	Rock	24 December 2020	
147	LadBaby	"Don't Stop Me Eatin'"	Frtyfve	31 December 2020	
2021
148	Asian Dub Foundation	"Comin' Over Here"	X-Ray	7 January 2021	
149	Little Mix	"Sweet Melody"	RCA	14 January 2021	
150	Olivia Rodrigo	"Drivers License"	Interscope	21 January 2021	
151	Anne-Marie, KSI and Digital Farm Animals	"Don't Play"	Asylum	28 January 2021	
152	Nathan Evans, 220 Kid and Billen Ted	"Wellerman"	Polydor	4 February 2021	
153	Ella Henderson and Tom Grennan	"Let's Go Home Together"	Atlantic	4 March 2021	
