= Another Level =

Another Level may refer to:

- Another Level (band), an English soul and R&B influenced boy band
  - Another Level (Another Level album), 1998
- Another Level (Blackstreet album), 1996
- "Another Level", a song by Alb featuring MC Soom-T from A Bugged Out Mix
- Another Level, an album by Luther Barnes & The Sunset Jubilaires
