= Poison (Rita Ora song) =

2015 single by Rita Ora

Single by Rita Ora
- Released: 18 May 2015
- Recorded: 2014–2015
- Genre: EDM; power pop
- Length: 3:22: 3:40 (Acoustic)
- Label: Roc Nation; Columbia
- Songwriters: Kate Nash; Nolan Lambroza; Julia Michaels
- Producer: Sir Nolan

Rita Ora singles chronology
"New York Raining" (2015)	"Poison" (2015)	"Body on Me" (2015)

Music video
- "Poison" on YouTube

"Poison" is a song by British singer Rita Ora. The song was released on 18 May 2015 and peaked at number three on the UK Singles Chart, making it her eighth top-ten song in the UK.

== Composition ==
"Poison"
A 19-second sample of the chorus in "Poison" which builds in intensity with Ora belting out its lyrics over crashing production.

"Poison" is an EDM and pop number, and a modern take on a pop power ballad. It has a moderately fast tempo of 124 beats per minute. "Poison" contains elements of electronic music, combined with a "chewy" pop hook. In an interview for Vice, Ora said that she was baffled by the track being described as EDM-leaning. She felt that it was more passionate and not electronic-sounding at all, and stated "it's more of a rocky, edgy pop record made by a pop star." Aside from the track's crashing production, "Poison" is primarily melodic with soaring, stripped-down vocal performance which spans from the note of G_{3} to E♭_{5}.

Set in the key of B-flat major, "Poison" follows a basic chord progression of B♭-B♭/D-E♭_{add9}, and is drum-heavy in its instrumentation throughout. The song opens with a tender piano progression. Sharp percussion and dark string instrumentation begins playing as the chorus builds in intensity. Drums later feature most prominently during the middle eight.

Although upbeat, "Poison" is emotive in tone. Its lyrical content details pain experienced from a dysfunctional relationship with a backstabbing, toxic love interest. Ora said the track was not about any specific individual, but about "bad luck" with love in general and how love is envisaged in a period when it's poisonous.

== Critical reception ==
"Poison" has received critical acclaim. Jennifer Ruby of the London Evening Standard hailed it as Ora's "pop comeback". Writing in the Liverpool Echo, Jade Wright deemed the track "colossal and extremely addictive", and said that Ora "returned in style". Vibe called it a "dangerous" single, commending Ora's "refreshingly stripped down performance". Tom Richardson of the Gay Times highlighted its "fresh mature sound". The Irish Times named it their track of the week, with Ailbhe Malone writing, "This falls into one of our favourite musical subgenres – the emotional banger". Mark Savage of BBC News deemed it "a fiery foot-stomper". Rap-Up noted the song's "radio-friendly hook". Anne T Donahue of The Guardian opined, "Sorrowful enough to soundtrack summer nights in contemplating old flames, but fast enough to fuel nights out dancing in hope of meeting new ones, this jam could be the bridge Ora needs to secure her mainstream spot in America".

Writing in Time, Nolan Feeney said the track was "synthtastic" and "gives the singer reasons to keep trying", concluding, "This doesn't feel like the mega-smash single that will completely reverse her luck, but its you-ooo-ooh-ooh hook shows she can be a worthy vessel of solid material". Conversely, Dana Rose Falcone of Entertainment Weekly said the single "falls in line" with Ora's "poppy hits", "I Will Never Let You Down" and "How We Do (Party)" (2012). While Lewis Corner and Amy Davidson of Digital Spy commented that it lacked the "instant pull" of "I Will Never Let You Down", but had "solid chart potential nonetheless". Andrew Hampp of Billboard gave "Poison" three out of five stars, and said that it did not "match the playful aesthetic" of "I Will Never Let You Down", but its "belted, from-the-gut chorus may prove to be stickier". Stereogum's Chris DeVille said "Poison" was the "Best Rita Ora song ever", but "a second-rate redux" of Tove Lo's "Timebomb" (2015).

== Commercial performance ==
"Poison" debuted at number three in the UK singles chart with first-week sales of 55,855 units marking Ora's eighth top 10 hit. The song dropped to number seven the following week with sales of 21,530 units. It registered a sales increase in its third week selling 34,798 units, but dropped to number 13 and was present on the chart for a total of 14 weeks. On 3 February 2023, it was certified platinum by the British Phonographic Industry (BPI) for sales of over 600,000 units.

"Poison" entered the Irish Singles Chart issued for 2 July 2015 at number 21, and climbed to a peak of number 18 the following week, becoming Ora's sixth top 20 hit in Ireland. In Australia, "Poison" debuted at number 74 on the ARIA Singles Chart dated 27 June 2015, and went on to reach a peak of number 30, marking Ora's sixth top 40 hit in the country. The Australian Recording Industry Association (ARIA) certified "Poison" gold for selling 35,000 copies.

== Music video ==
A music video to accompany the release of "Poison" was first released on Vevo on 3 June 2015 at a total length of four minutes and fifty-three seconds. An additional video was released for the official remix of the song, featuring Krept and Konan, for Hunger TV.

== Live performances ==
Ora first performed "Poison" as part of her sets for Radio 1's Big Weekend 2015 on 24 May 2015, and the Summertime Ball on 7 June 2015. She then reprised "Poison" on The Graham Norton Show which aired on 26 June 2015; wearing a black bra, ripped jeans, and a large, fringed black leather jacket. Idolator's Christina Lee wrote that in a live setting, Ora's "powerful vocals [in the song] are more pronounced, to where she sounds like she's taking the subject matter to heart". Writing in the Daily Express, Becca Longmire said Ora "flashed a lot of flesh" with her "revealing" outfit which she felt "arguably overshadowed the music". Ora performed "Poison" at G-A-Y on the day of Pride London on 28 June 2015; where she draped herself in a rainbow flag during the rendition as a nod to Pride London. The same day, she performed the Zdot Remix of the song with Krept and Konan as part of her set for the Wireless Festival. Ora further promoted "Poison" with a performance on The John Bishop Show which aired on 4 July 2015.

== Track listings ==
- Digital download
1. "Poison" – 3:22
- Digital download – Acoustic
1. "Poison" (Acoustic) – 3:40
- Digital download – The Remixes
1. "Poison" (featuring Krept and Konan) [Zdot Remix] – 3:51
2. "Poison" (Perplexus Remix) – 4:07
3. "Poison" (David Zowie Remix) – 5:24
4. "Poison" (Myles James Vocal Remix) – 6:45

== Charts ==
Chart performance for "Poison"
Chart (2015)	Peak position
Australia (ARIA)	30
Belgium (Ultratip Bubbling Under Flanders)	45
Czech Republic Airplay (ČNS IFPI)	42
Czech Republic Singles Digital (ČNS IFPI)	41
Euro Digital Songs (Billboard)	5
Ireland (IRMA)	18
Mexico Inglés Airplay (Billboard)	13
Scottish Singles Sales (Official Charts)	2
Slovakia Singles Digital (ČNS IFPI)	51
South Africa Airplay (EMA)	10
Ukraine Airplay (TopHit)	117
UK Singles (Official Charts)	3

== Certifications ==
Region	Certification	Certified units/sales
Australia (ARIA)	Gold	35,000^{^}
New Zealand (RMNZ)	Gold	15,000^{‡}
United Kingdom (BPI)	Platinum	600,000^{‡}
^{^} Shipments figures based on certification alone.^{‡} Sales+streaming figures based on certification alone.

== Release history ==
Country	Date	Format	Label	Ref.
France	18 May 2015	Digital download	Roc Nation; Columbia; Sony	
Italy	18 May 2015	Digital download	Roc Nation; Columbia; Sony	
Spain	18 May 2015	Digital download	Roc Nation; Columbia; Sony	
Italy	12 June 2015	Contemporary hit radio	Roc Nation; Columbia; Sony	
United States	16 June 2015	Digital download	Roc Nation; Columbia; Sony	
France	28 June 2015	Digital download – The Remixes	Roc Nation; Columbia; Sony	
Germany	28 June 2015	Digital download – The Remixes	Roc Nation; Columbia; Sony	
Italy	28 June 2015	Digital download – The Remixes	Roc Nation; Columbia; Sony	
Spain	28 June 2015	Digital download – The Remixes	Roc Nation; Columbia; Sony	
United Kingdom	28 June 2015	Digital download	Roc Nation; Columbia; Sony	
United Kingdom	28 June 2015	Digital download – The Remixes	Roc Nation; Columbia; Sony	
United States	28 June 2015	Digital download – The Remixes	Roc Nation; Columbia; Sony	
France	30 June 2015	Digital download – Acoustic	Roc Nation; Columbia; Sony	
Germany	30 June 2015	Digital download – Acoustic	Roc Nation; Columbia; Sony	
Italy	30 June 2015	Digital download – Acoustic	Roc Nation; Columbia; Sony	
Spain	30 June 2015	Digital download – Acoustic	Roc Nation; Columbia; Sony	
United Kingdom	30 June 2015	Digital download – Acoustic	Roc Nation; Columbia; Sony	
United States	30 June 2015	Digital download – Acoustic	Roc Nation; Columbia; Sony	

== See also ==
- List of UK top 10 singles in 2015
