= Nexus (Another Level album) =

Studio album by Another Level
- Released: 13 September 1999
- Recorded: 1998–1999
- Genre: Pop; R&B
- Label: BMG; Northwestside
- Producer: Dwight "Skrapp" Reynolds; Cutfather & Joe; TQ; Jamahl Harris; Supa'Flyas; Fitzgerald Scott; Stonebridge; Bradley Spalter; Adam Kagan; Michael Norfleet; Dodge; Derrick Martin; Gerald Baillergeau; Harvey Mason Jr.; Dane Bowers; Gordon Chambers; Wayne Williams; Jon Beckford; Ivor Reid; Mark Reid; Tony Salter; Khris Kellow

Another Level chronology
Another Level (1998)	Nexus (1999)	From the Heart (2002)

Singles from Nexus
- 1. "From the Heart" Released: 31 May 1999; 2. "Summertime" Released: 23 August 1999; 3. "Bomb Diggy" Released: 1 November 1999

Nexus is the second and final studio album by English boyband Another Level, released on 13 September 1999 in the United Kingdom by Northwestside Records. The album includes the theme from Notting Hill, "From the Heart", released by the band in May 1999. The album includes the singles "Summertime" and "Bomb Diggy", which became the band's final single. The album peaked at number 7 on the UK Singles Chart. A limited-edition version of the album (limited to 10,000 copies) with a bonus disc was made available on the day of release.

== Track listing ==
No.	Title	Writer(s)	Producer(s)	Length
1.	"Nexus"	Bobak Kianoush; Dwight "Skrapp" Reynolds	Reynolds	1:40
2.	"Bomb Diggy"	Reynolds	Derrick "Lil' Redd" Martin; Reynolds; Cutfather & Joe (co.)	3:35
3.	"Summertime" (featuring TQ)	Terrance Quaites; Doug Rasheed	TQ; Jamahl Harris	3:29
4.	"We'll Meet Again"	Mark Baron; Rasmus Bille-Bähmcke; Kianoush; Rene Romborg	Supa'Flyas	3:41
5.	"I Like the Way (The Kissing Game)"	Bernard Belle; Teddy Riley; Dave Way	Fitzgerald Scott; Stonebridge	4:21
6.	"Nothing Left to See"	Dane Bowers; Adrian Clarke; Roger Drakes; Michelle Escoffery	Dodge	4:07
7.	"Ain't a Damn Thing Wrong"	Michael Norfleet; Bradley Spalter; J. Thompson; D. Weisberg	Spalter; Adam Kagan (add. vocal); Norfleet (add. vocal)	4:02
8.	"My Girl"	Baron; Kianoush; Martin; Reynolds	Da Bandits; Martin (co.); Reynolds (co.)	3:55
9.	"Ain't Nothing Going on But the Sex"	Gerald Baillergeau; Todd Brown; Jaque Maston	Baillergeau	4:34
10.	"What You Know About Me" (featuring MC Fats)	Brad Gilderman; Rodney Jerkins; Harvey Mason Jr.; Wayne Williams	Mason Jr.	5:15
11.	"That Girl Belongs to Me"	Bowers; Gordon Chambers; Williams	Bowers; Chambers; Williams	3:22
12.	"Hide"	Baron; Jon Beckford; Kianoush; Ivor Reid; Mark Reid	Beckford; I. Reid; M. Reid	4:04
13.	"Kai"	Bowers	Tony Salter	1:50
14.	"From the Heart"	Diane Warren	Khris Kellow	4:52

Japanese bonus track
No.	Title	Writer(s)	Producer(s)	Length
15.	"Summertime" (featuring TQ) (Allstar remix)	Quaites; Rasheed	TQ; Harris; Allstar (remix)	4:02

Brazil bonus track
No.	Title	Writer(s)	Producer(s)	Length
15.	"From the Heart" (K-Klass radio mix)	Warren	Kellow; K-Klass (remix)	3:36

Limited edition bonus disc
No.	Title	Writer(s)	Producer(s)	Length
1.	"Now She's Steady Callin'"	Baron; Teron Beal; Bowers; Kianoush; Cynthia Loving; Darryl "Big Baby" McClary; Williams	Big Baby	3:32
2.	"Girlfriend"	David Anthony; Baron; Beal; Bowers; Kianoush; Phillip White; Williams	Anthony	4:59
3.	"From the Heart" (Frankie Knuckles radio mix)	Warren	Kellow; Frankie Knuckles (remix)	4:25
4.	"I Want You for Myself" (Full Intention radio mix)	Baron; Bowers; Kianoush; Dakari St. Aimee; Billy "Bad" Ward; Williams	Ward; Cutfather & Joe (remix); Full Intention (remix)	3:31
5.	"Interview with Sally Stratton"		Nigel Appleton	15:13

== Charts ==
=== Weekly charts ===
Chart (1999)	Peak position
European Albums Chart	41
Scottish Albums (OCC)	32
UK Albums (OCC)	7

=== Year-end charts ===
Chart (1999)	Position
UK Albums (OCC)	91

== Certifications ==
Region	Certification	Certified units/sales
United Kingdom (BPI)	Gold	100,000^{^}
^{^} Shipments figures based on certification alone.
