= From the Heart (song) =

1999 single by Another Level

Single by Another Level

from the album Notting Hill: Music from the Motion Picture and Nexus
- Released: 31 May 1999
- Recorded: 1999
- Genre: R&B
- Songwriter: Diane Warren

Another Level singles chronology
"Be Alone No More (Remix)" / "Holding Back the Years" (1999)	"From the Heart" (1999)	"Summertime" (1999)

"From the Heart" is a 1999 single by Another Level, recorded for the soundtrack of the 1999 film Notting Hill, and subsequently included on their second album, Nexus. Written by Diane Warren, it reached #6 on the UK Singles Chart.

== Covers ==
British musical theatre actress and singer Elaine Paige recorded a version of the song in 2000, which was released on her 2004 compilation Centre Stage: The Very Best of Elaine Paige. US dance producer Frankie Knuckles remixed the song. An edit of the remix appears on the UK single.

== Charts ==
=== Weekly charts ===
Chart (1999)	Peak position
Australia (ARIA)	143
Belgium (Ultratop 50 Flanders)	28
Europe (Eurochart Hot 100)	26
Germany (GfK)	29
Ireland (IRMA)	14
Italy (Musica e dischi)	31
Netherlands (Dutch Top 40)	29
Netherlands (Single Top 100)	32
Netherlands Airplay (Music & Media)	19
New Zealand (Recorded Music NZ)	39
Sweden (Sverigetopplistan)	25
Switzerland (Schweizer Hitparade)	18
UK Singles (OCC)	6
UK Airplay (Music Week)	6

=== Year-end charts ===
Chart (1999)	Position
Netherlands (Dutch Top 40)	192
UK Singles (OCC)	129

== Certifications ==
Certifications and sales for "From the Heart"
Region	Certification	Certified units/sales
United Kingdom (BPI)	Silver	200,000^{‡}
^{‡} Sales+streaming figures based on certification alone.
