= Focus (Ariana Grande song) =

2015 single by Ariana Grande

Single by Ariana Grande
- Released: October 30, 2015
- Recorded: 2015
- Studio: MXM Studios (Los Angeles, California); Wolf Cousins Studios (Stockholm, Sweden)
- Length: 3:31
- Label: Republic
- Songwriters: Savan Kotecha; Peter Svensson; Ilya; Ariana Grande
- Producers: Max Martin; Ilya

Ariana Grande singles chronology
"E più ti penso" (2015)	"Focus" (2015)	"Boys Like You" (2015)

Music video
- "Focus" on YouTube

"Focus" is a song by American singer-songwriter Ariana Grande. It was released on October 30, 2015, by Republic Records. Originally intended to be the lead single off of Grande's third studio album, Dangerous Woman, then named Moonlight, the song was scrapped from the album with its title track serving as the official lead single. The song appears as a bonus track on the Japan standard and deluxe edition of the album. Written by Savan Kotecha, Peter Svensson, Grande and Ilya, and produced by the latter with Max Martin, the song features horns with cowbells and handclaps as percussion.

The song received mixed reviews from music critics who praised Grande's vocals and the song's brassy production but criticized its similarity to her 2014 hit "Problem". "Focus" debuted at number seven on the Billboard Hot 100 chart with 113,000 downloads in its first week. It was Grande's sixth top-ten single, and her first unaccompanied by another artist. The song also reached the top ten in Canada, Australia, Austria, Italy, Israel, the Netherlands, and the United Kingdom. By January 2016, "Focus" sold 544,000 copies in the United States and was certified double Platinum by the RIAA.

Its music video, directed by Hannah Lux Davis, premiered on October 30, 2015, on Grande's YouTube channel. Until 2019, it remained the fourth most viewed music video on Grande's YouTube channel. She performed "Focus" at the 2015 American Music Awards and at the iHeartRadio Theater Los Angeles concert, and it was on the set list of the second leg of Grande's 2017 Dangerous Woman Tour.

== Background and release ==
"Focus" was written by Savan Kotecha, Peter Svensson, Grande and Ilya. It was produced by Max Martin and Ilya. Serban Ghenea mixed the song, assisted by John Hanes. Grande began working on a new material for her third studio album in May 2015, posting details about the project on social media and in conversations with the public. The album was originally entitled Moonlight. The singer posted an unfocused picture of herself on her Instagram page in July 2015 with the caption "Focus", calling it a "hint". A video released in September 2015 by iHeartMedia Music Summit demonstrated that Grande, Republic Records CEO Monte Lipman and her manager, Charlie Walk, played the song to the approval of the Republic Records staff.

Grande announced the single during her September 15, 2015 appearance on The Tonight Show Starring Jimmy Fallon, with a release date of October 30. She began posting snippets of the song's lyrics, video and audio previews and pixelated versions of the single's cover in early October on Instagram and Twitter, and unveiled "Focus"' cover art on October 14. A week before the song's release date, A 15-second snippet of the track was used in a commercial for Ari by Ariana Grande, the singer's debut fragrance. "Focus" was digitally released worldwide on October 30, 2015, and was added to hot adult contemporary playlists in the United States on November 2. It was later released to American and Italian contemporary hit radio stations on November 3 and 6 respectively. "Focus" was released as a maxi single in Japan on December 4, with regular version containing a mini-calendar and a mini-poster, whilst deluxe edition containing a poster and an A7-sized notebook.

=== Removal from Dangerous Woman ===
The song was originally intended to be the lead single of Grande's then-named third studio album, Moonlight. Republic Records later told Billboard that the track had been removed from the album's standard edition and that the lead single will be changed to "Dangerous Woman". The song was moved to the album's Japan edition as a bonus track. Vulture editor Dee Locket explained that "Focus" was not included on the album's final cut because the song's rollout was not "remembered as a success – it was calculated to a fault, too polished for a time when pop's biggest stars, particularly its women, were letting their flaws bleed into the music."

== Music and lyrics ==
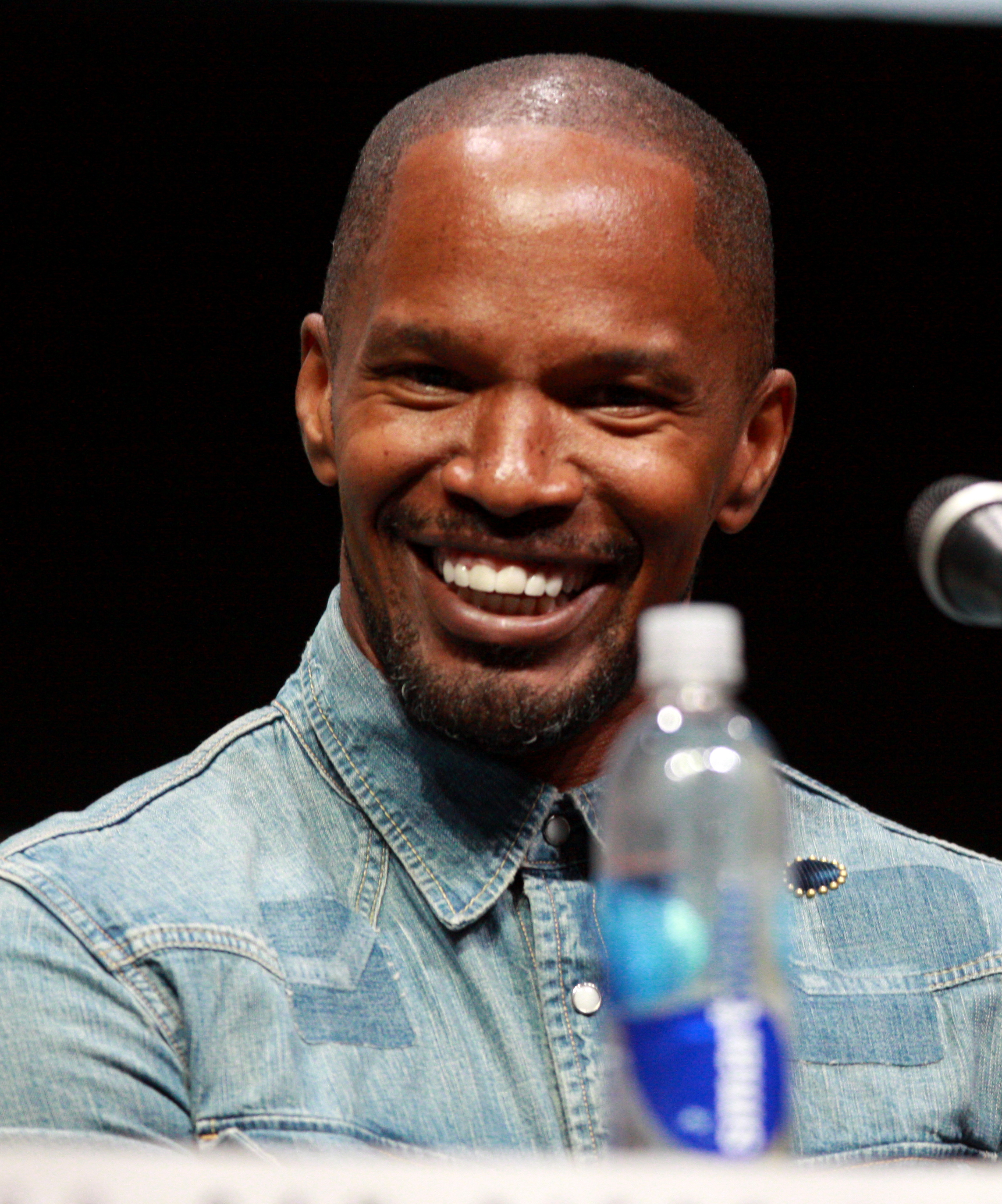
Jamie Foxx sings in the chorus of "Focus".

According to sheet music published by Kobalt Music on Musicnotes.com, "Focus" was written in the key of G♯ minor and set in 4/4 time at a moderate tempo of 100 beats per minute. Grande's voice ranges from C♯_{4} to G♯_{5}. A retro-styled song, "Focus" is based on a 1970s-inspired dance beat. According to Ryan Reed of Rolling Stone, its instrumentation features "stabbing big-band brass" (with saxophone, trumpet and a trombone), smooth synths and clanging percussion with synthesized handclaps and a cowbell. The song's horn foundation has been compared to Grande's 2014 single, "Problem" (featuring Australian rapper Iggy Azalea) from her album, My Everything. In an Entertainment Tonight interview, Grande acknowledged "Focus"' similarity to "Problem"; she thought the former would be the "perfect transition record" from her last album to her new album, because it sounds like "Problem 2.0".

Lyrically, Grande asks for attention and focus. Marcus Floyd of Renowned for Sound wrote that in the second verse, Grande "addresses her haters and insists that they address her realness". Its "funky" chorus consists of the repeated phrase, "Focus on me", sung by American actor Jamie Foxx in a bass voice. Grande explained the hook:

When I say, "Focus on me", I'm not asking to be the center of attention. I'm not asking you to focus on my face or my clothes or my body or my singing voice. By "focus on me", I literally mean focus on me. Focus on what I'm all about and what I believe in. The more we focus on each other as people and not on what we look like, what we're wearing, our gender, our hairstyle, our sexuality, the color of our skin. But focus on each other on a soul level. The more we realize how much we have in common, the more we listen to each other, the more one we become.

== Critical reception ==
Amy Davison from Digital Spy praised "Focus"' "sax-driven" beat; Kaitlyn Tiffany of The Verge called Grande a "massively talented vocalist", and "Focus" a "very pleasant" listen. Time's Nolan Feeney noted that although it was similar to "Problem", it may not have been a poor single decision. On Renowned for Sound, Marcus Floyd called "Focus" predictably "catchy and attention grabbing"; the song ticks "all the boxes of an effective lead single." Giving it four out of five stars, he wrote that "Focus" is one of Grande's "stronger single releases" to date but did not "venture out" of her "comfort zone." Steven J. Horowitz of Billboard gave the song two-and-a-half out of five stars and wrote that Grande had never released a "less-than-great" single until "Focus", which he considered a "weak" rehash of "Problem".

Time called "Focus" the fifth-worst song of 2015, calling Grande's vocal "dwarfed" by "too-big instrumentals" as it had been on "Problem" and "Break Free"; however, the latter two had a "sustaining energy" which "Focus" lacked. The singer needed a "tightly constructed, elegant hit" after her 2015 doughnut controversy, "and this isn't it". Although Brennan Carley of Spin called the song a "catchy slow-burn" and a "horn heavy piece of retro-modern fusion", Grande's vocals lacked "real excitement from a star who's got the restraint and skill to take her instrument places most other pop singers can't anymore." Carley criticized the song's "male howling" for "[getting] grating quickly" and making "Focus" too similar to "Problem".

=== Year-end lists ===
Publication	List	Rank	Ref.
Stereogum	The 50 Best Pop Songs Of 2015	42	
Time	Worst Songs of 2015	5	

== Commercial performance ==
"Focus" debuted at number seven on the Billboard Hot 100 in the United States, selling 113,000 digital downloads in its first full week, becoming Grande's sixth top-ten single and fourth top-ten debut on the chart. It was her first solo top ten in the country, unaccompanied by another artist. The song entered the Digital Songs chart at number five and was number 13 on the Streaming Songs chart, with 13.3 million domestic streams. It fell to number 13 in its second week on the Hot 100, rebounding to number 12 in its third week following Grande's performance at the 2015 American Music Awards. By April 2018, "Focus" sold over 544,000 digital downloads in the US and was certified double Platinum by the RIAA. It debuted and peaked at number eight on the Canadian Hot 100, Grande's fifth Canadian top-ten single.

The song debuted at number ten on the Official Singles Chart in the United Kingdom, Grande's third top ten after the number-one singles "Problem" and "Bang Bang". In its second week, the song fell fourteen positions placing at number 24; it spent a total of 14 weeks on the charts. "Focus" also reached the top ten in Australia, Austria, Greece, Italy, the Netherlands and Spain.

== Music video ==
=== Background and synopsis ===
Screenshot from the "Focus" video; according to Nick Maslow of People magazine, Grande appears in a "world of purple".

The music video for "Focus" was released on YouTube on October 29, 2015. Hannah Lux Davis, who directed the video, also directed the music videos for Grande's "Love Me Harder" and the singer's joint single, "Bang Bang". The video features the Samsung Galaxy Note 5.

The video begins with Grande writing the phrase "focus on me" on a Galaxy Note 5 using its S Pen. During the first verse, scenes of Grande lip-syncing the song are intercut with silhouettes of the singer dancing in a purple circle. She then performs a choreographed routine with six backing dancers on a purple set. During the second verse, she smiles and poses in a square wearing a black mini dress and high Toni Basil-style boots. For the song's bridge, the singer (in a star-print leotard, photographed in black-and-white) lies on a neon-lit set, plays a trumpet and performs with her dancers. The video ends with her right eye illuminated. Teen Vogue's Ella Cerón noted its "slightly throwback" visuals, which match the song.

=== Reception ===
Sean Fitz-Gerald of Vulture called the video's geometric look similar to the videos for Drake's "Hotline Bling" (2015) and Lil Mama's "Lip Gloss" (2007). Billboard's staff ranked the music video for "Focus" as Grande's seventh-best, describing it as "out-of-this-world" with "star-emblazoned jumpsuits and neon wigs"; they compared the clip's aesthetic to the Disney Channel Original Movie Zenon: Girl of the 21st Century (1999) and Grande's dancing to Beyoncé's in the video for "Single Ladies (Put a Ring on It)" (2008). The music video has received over 1 billion views on YouTube, becoming her eighth most-viewed upload on the site.

== Live performances ==
Prior to the release of "Focus", Grande started teasing snippets of the song during the last shows of The Honeymoon Tour in October 2015. Grande performed "Focus" live for the first time on the Honda Stage at the iHeartRadio Theater in Los Angeles on October 30, 2015. She also performed the song at the 2015 American Music Awards on November 22, ranked by Billboard as the best performance of the night. According to Bruna Nessif of E!, Grande brought some "old Hollywood glamour" to the performance. Grande performed "Focus" and a cover of "Merry Christmas (War is Over)" on Disney's Christmas Day special. The song was also performed on the Dangerous Woman Tour in 2017 starting with the second leg in Europe.

== Track listing ==
Digital download

1. "Focus" – 3:31

Japanese CD maxi single

1. "Focus" – 3:31
2. "Focus" (karaoke version) – 3:31
3. "Message in Japanese from Ariana" – 0:40

Other Versions

- 7th Heaven Club Mix - 6:20
- 7th Heaven Radio Edit - 4:15

== Credits and personnel ==
Credits adapted from the liner notes of the "Focus" CD single.

Recording

- Recorded at MXM Studios, Los Angeles, United States and Wolf Cousins Studios, Stockholm, Sweden
- Mixed at MixStar Studios, Virginia Beach, United States
- Mastered at Sterling Sound, New York City, United States

Management

- All rights administered by MXM (administered by Kobalt), Wolf Cousins (STIM), Warner Chappell Music Scand (STIM), Universal Music Corp./GRANDARIMUSIC (ASCAP)

Personnel

- Ariana Grande – lead vocals, songwriter
- Savan Kotecha – songwriter, background vocals
- Ilya Salmanzadeh – songwriter, producer, guitar, bass, keyboards, programming, background vocals
- Max Martin – producer, programming
- Jonas Thander – horn arrangement, saxophone
- Steffan Findin – trombone
- Stefan Persson – trumpet
- Jonne Bentlöv – trumpet
- Peter Carlsson – percussion
- Peter Svensson – bass
- Jamie Foxx – uncredited vocals
- Sam Holland – recording
- Serban Ghenea – mixing
- Tom Coyne – mastering
- John Hanes - mixing assistant

Photographer

- Alfredo Flores

== Charts ==
=== Weekly charts ===
Weekly chart performance for "Focus"
Chart (2015–2016)	Peak position
Australia (ARIA)	10
Austria (Ö3 Austria Top 40)	9
Belgium (Ultratop 50 Flanders)	14
Belgium (Ultratop 50 Wallonia)	33
Canada Hot 100 (Billboard)	8
Canada CHR/Top 40 (Billboard)	11
Canada Hot AC (Billboard)	23
CIS Airplay (TopHit)	143
Czech Republic Airplay (ČNS IFPI)	41
Czech Republic Singles Digital (ČNS IFPI)	8
Denmark (Tracklisten)	30
Euro Digital Song Sales (Billboard)	9
Finland Airplay (Radiosoittolista)	25
France (SNEP)	29
Germany (GfK)	18
Greece Digital Songs (Billboard)	2
Guatemala Airplay (Monitor Latino)	2
Hungary (Editors' Choice Top 40)	17
Hungary (Single Top 40)	12
Hungary (Stream Top 40)	13
Ireland (IRMA)	14
Israel International Airplay (Media Forest)	4
Italy (FIMI)	8
Japan Hot 100 (Billboard)	19
Japan (Oricon)	40
Mexico (Billboard Mexican Airplay)	18
Mexico Streaming (AMPROFON)	11
Mexico Anglo (Monitor Latino)	11
Netherlands (Dutch Top 40)	7
Netherlands (Single Top 100)	9
New Zealand (Recorded Music NZ)	16
Norway (VG-lista)	20
Portugal Digital Song Sales (Billboard)	9
Scottish Singles Sales (Official Charts)	7
Slovakia Airplay (ČNS IFPI)	69
Slovakia Singles Digital (ČNS IFPI)	10
South Korea International Chart (Gaon)	10
Spain (Promusicae)	22
Sweden (Sverigetopplistan)	14
Switzerland (Schweizer Hitparade)	16
UK Singles (Official Charts)	10
US Billboard Hot 100	7
US Adult Pop Airplay (Billboard)	38
US Dance Airplay (Billboard)	18
US Dance Club Songs (Billboard)	24
US Pop Airplay (Billboard)	13
US Rhythmic Airplay (Billboard)	11
Venezuela English (Record Report)	13
Venezuela Pop (Record Report)	25

=== Year-end charts ===
Yearly chart performance for "Focus"
Chart (2015)	Position
Netherlands (Dutch Top 40)	75
Netherlands (NPO 3FM)	87
Chart (2016)	Position
Canada (Canadian Hot 100)	87

== Certifications and sales ==
Certifications and sales for "Focus"
Region	Certification	Certified units/sales
Australia (ARIA)	Platinum	70,000^{‡}
Brazil (Pro-Música Brasil)	Diamond	250,000^{‡}
Canada (Music Canada)	Gold	40,000^{*}
Denmark (IFPI Danmark)	Gold	45,000^{‡}
Italy (FIMI)	Platinum	50,000^{‡}
New Zealand (RMNZ)	Gold	7,500^{*}
Norway (IFPI Norway)	Gold	30,000^{‡}
Poland (ZPAV)	2× Platinum	40,000^{‡}
South Korea (Gaon)	—	56,000
Spain (Promusicae)	Gold	20,000^{‡}
Sweden (GLF)	Platinum	40,000^{‡}
United Kingdom (BPI)	Gold	400,000^{‡}
United States (RIAA)	2× Platinum	490,000
^{*} Sales figures based on certification alone.^{‡} Sales+streaming figures based on certification alone.

== Release history ==
Release dates and formats for "Focus"
Region	Date	Format	Version	Label	Ref.
United Kingdom	October 30, 2015	Digital download	Original	Republic	
United States	November 2, 2015	Hot adult contemporary radio	Original	Republic	
United States	November 3, 2015	Contemporary hit radio	Original	Republic	
Italy	November 6, 2015	Radio airplay	Original	Universal	
Japan	December 4, 2015	MCD	Regular; deluxe; limited	Universal	

== See also ==
- List of Billboard Hot 100 top-ten singles in 2015
- List of UK top-ten singles in 2015
