= Baby (Anton Powers and Pixie Lott song) =

Single by Anton Powers and Pixie Lott
- Released: 31 March 2017
- Recorded: 2016
- Length: 3:09
- Label: 3Beat Productions
- Songwriter(s): Anton Powers; Matthew Humphrey; Frank Bullens; Polly S Elcoat; Rose Singleton
- Producer(s): Powers; Humphrey; Bullens

Anton Powers singles chronology
"Love You Better" (2016)	"Baby" (2017)

Pixie Lott singles chronology
"Caravan of Love" (2014)	"Baby" (2017)	"Won't Forget You" (2017)

"Baby" is a song performed by English DJ and producer Anton Powers and English singer Pixie Lott. The song was released in the United Kingdom as a digital download on 31 March 2017 through 3Beat Productions. The song peaked at number 97 on the UK Singles Chart and number 28 on the Scottish Singles Chart.

== Background ==
Talking about the single, Pixie said, "it feels like a new chapter for me. I had a lot of fun working with Anton on Baby. We first met years ago when he remixed my song "Gravity" but we bumped into each other in Ibiza last Summer and I knew he was someone I wanted to work with again."

== Live performances ==
Anton Powers and Pixie Lott gave their first live performance of the song on The Voice UK Final on 1 April 2017. Powers and Lott also performed the song on All Round to Mrs. Brown's on 8 April 2017.

== Music video ==
A music video to accompany the release of "Baby" was first released onto YouTube on 14 April 2017 at a total length of three minutes and nineteen seconds.

== Track listing ==
Digital download
No.	Title	Length
1.	"Baby"	3:09
2.	"Baby" (Extended Mix)	4:37

== Charts ==
Chart performance for "Baby"
Chart (2017)	Peak position
Scotland (OCC)	28
UK Singles (OCC)	97
UK Dance (OCC)	14

== Certifications ==
Certifications for "Baby"
Region	Certification	Certified units/sales
United Kingdom (BPI)	Silver	200,000^{‡}
^{‡} Sales+streaming figures based on certification alone.

== Release history ==
Release history for "Baby"
Region	Date	Format	Label
United Kingdom	31 March 2017	Digital download	3Beat Productions
