= Another Level (Another Level album) =

Studio album by Another Level
- Released: 9 November 1998
- Recorded: 1998
- Genres: Pop; R&B
- Labels: BMG; Northwestside
- Producers: Jason Osborne; Fitzgerald Scott; Cutfather & Joe; Gordon Chambers; D-Moet; Billy "Bad" Ward; Dane Bowers; Wayne Williams; Linslee Campbell; Joey Elias; John Robinson; The Boilerhouse Boys; D'Influence; S.P.A; Jan Kincaid; Another Level; Stephen Emmanuel

Another Level chronology
Another Level (1998)	Nexus (1999)

Singles from Another Level
- 1. "Be Alone No More" Released: 16 February 1998; 2. "Freak Me" Released: 6 July 1998; 3. "I Guess I Was a Fool" Released: 26 October 1998; 4. "I Want You for Myself" Released: 11 January 1999

Professional ratings
Review scores
Source	Rating
AllMusic	3/5 stars

Another Level is the self-titled debut studio album by English boy band Another Level, released on 9 November 1998 in the United Kingdom by Northwestside Records. It includes the number one single "Freak Me", originally sung by Silk, as well as the top 10 singles "Be Alone No More", "Guess I Was a Fool" and "I Want You for Myself". The album peaked at number thirteen in the United Kingdom, where it was certified platinum on 9 April 1999.

== Track listing ==
No.	Title	Writer(s)	Producer(s)	Length
1.	"Into Another Level"	Mark Baron; Dane Bowers; Bobak Kianoush; Wayne Williams	Jason Osborne	1:08
2.	"Freak Me" (Cutfather & Joe mix)	Roy Murray; Keith Sweat	Fitzgerald Scott; Cutfather & Joe (co.)	4:55
3.	"Rain"	Gordon Chambers; D-Moet	Chambers; D-Moet	4:10
4.	"I Want You for Myself"	Baron; Bowers; Kianoush; Dakari St. Aimee; Billy "Bad" Ward; Williams	Ward; Cutfather & Joe (remix)	5:08
5.	"I Can See You in My Mind"	Baron; Bowers; Kianoush; Williams	Bowers; Williams; Linslee Campbell (add.)	2:30
6.	"Guess I Was a Fool"	Joey Elias; Jon-John Robinson	Elias; Robinson; The Boilerhouse Boys (co.)	5:26
7.	"Girl What You Wanna Do" (featuring Shola Ama)	Shola Ama; Bowers; John Paul; S.P.A; Williams	D'Influence; S.P.A	4:22
8.	"Whatever You Want"	Williams	Williams; Campbell (co.)	4:16
9.	"Don't Cry"	Donell Jones; Kenny Tonge	Jan Kincaid	3:51
10.	"Anytime You Need Me (Just Call Me Up)"	Baron; Bowers; Stephen Emmanuel; Kianoush; Williams	Another Level; Emmanuel	4:16
11.	"Be Alone No More" (featuring Jay-Z)	Steven Dubin; Andrea Martin; Ivan Matias	Cutfather & Joe	3:58

Japanese bonus track
No.	Title	Writer(s)	Producer(s)	Length
12.	"Be Alone No More" (Blacksmith hip hop mix) (featuring Jay-Z)	Dubin; A. Martin; Matias	Cutfather & Joe; Blacksmith (remix)	5:28

US edition
No.	Title	Writer(s)	Producer(s)	Length
1.	"Be Alone No More" (Cutfather & Joe remix) (featuring Jay-Z)	Dubin; A. Martin; Matias	Cutfather & Joe	4:13
2.	"Bomb Diggy"	Dwight "Skrapp" Reynolds	Derrick "Lil' Redd" Martin; Reynolds; Cutfather & Joe (co.)	3:35
3.	"Summertime" (featuring TQ)	Terrance Quaties; Doug Rasheed	TQ; Jamahl Harris	3:29
4.	"Freak Me" (Cutfather & Joe mix)	Murray; Sweat	Scott; Cutfather & Joe (co.)	4:55
5.	"I Want You for Myself"	Baron; Bowers; Kianoush; St. Aimee; Ward; Williams	Ward; Cutfather & Joe (remix)	5:09
6.	"From the Heart"	Diane Warren	Khris Kellow	4:52
7.	"What You Know About Me" (featuring MC Fats)	Brad Gilderman; Rodney Jerkins; Harvey Mason Jr.; Williams	Mason Jr.	5:15
8.	"Ain't Nothing Going on But the Sex"	Gerald Baillergeau; Todd Brown; Jaque Maston	Baillergeau	4:34
9.	"That Girl Belongs to Me"	Bowers; Gordon Chambers; Williams	Bowers; Chambers; Williams	3:22
10.	"Ain't a Damn Thing Wrong"	Michael Norfleet; Bradley Spalter; J. Thompson; D. Weisberg	Spalter; Adam Kagan (add. vocal); Norfleet (add. vocal)	4:02
11.	"Guess I Was a Fool"	Elias; Robinson	Elias; Robinson; The Boilerhouse Boys (co.)	5:26
12.	"Whatever You Want" (remix)	Williams	Williams; Campbell (co.); Ignorants (remix)	4:17
13.	"We'll Meet Again"	Baron; Rasmus Bille-Bähmcke; Kianoush; Rene Romborg	Supa'Flyas	3:41
14.	"I Can See You in My Mind"	Baron; Bowers; Kianoush; Williams	Bowers; Williams; Campbell (add.)	2:30

=== Another Level: Remixed ===
No.	Title	Writer(s)	Producer(s)	Length
1.	"Be Alone No More" (Blacksmith R&B club mix)	Dubin; A. Martin; Matias	Cutfather & Joe; Blacksmith (remix)	6:19
2.	"Freak Me" (Club Asylum classic vocal mix)	Murray; Sweat	Scott; Cutfather & Joe (co.); Club Asylum (remix)	7:31
3.	"Guess I Was a Fool" (MJ Cole remix)	Elias; Robinson	Elias; Robinson; The Boilerhouse Boys (co.); MJ Cole (remix)	6:52
4.	"I Want You for Myself" (Cutfather & Joe remix) (featuring Ghostface Killah)	Baron; Bowers; Dennis David Coles; Kianoush; St. Aimee; Ward; Williams	Ward; Cutfather & Joe (remix)	4:59
5.	"Be Alone No More" (Full Intention radio edit)	Dubin; A. Martin; Matias	Cutfather & Joe; Full Intention (remix)	3:41
6.	"Freak Me" (Rich Boogie remix) (featuring L-Fudge)	Murray; Sweat	Scott; Cutfather & Joe (co.); Rich Boogie (remix)	4:55
7.	"Guess I Was a Fool" (Opaz remix)	Elias; Robinson	Elias; Robinson; The Boilerhouse Boys (co.); Ray Hayden (remix)	5:22
8.	"I Want You for Myself" (Full Intention remix)	Baron; Bowers; Kianoush; St. Aimee; Ward; Williams	Ward; Cutfather & Joe (remix); Full Intention (remix)	8:02
9.	"Be Alone No More" (Cutfather & Joe remix) (featuring Jay-Z)	Dubin; A. Martin; Matias	Cutfather & Joe	4:12
10.	"Freak Me" (original version) (hidden track)	Murray; Sweat	Scott; Cutfather & Joe (co.)	4:59

== Charts and certifications ==
=== Weekly charts ===
Chart (1998–99)	Peak position
Australian Albums (ARIA)	144
Belgian Albums (Ultratop Flanders)	20
Dutch Albums (MegaCharts)	26
European Albums Chart	49
Irish Albums (IRMA)	26
Scottish Albums (OCC)	56
UK Albums (OCC)	13

=== Year-end charts ===
Chart (1998)	Position
UK Albums (OCC)	87
Chart (1999)	Position
UK Albums (OCC)	97

== Certifications ==
Region	Certification	Certified units/sales
United Kingdom (BPI)	Platinum	300,000^{^}
^{^} Shipments figures based on certification alone.
