= Wish You Were Mine =

2014 single by Philip George

Single by Philip George
- Released: 26 December 2014
- Recorded: 2014
- Genre: Deep house
- Length: 2:57
- Label: 3 Beat Productions
- Songwriters: Stevie Wonder; Sylvia Moy; Henry Cosby
- Producer: Philip George

Philip George singles chronology
"Wish You Were Mine" (2014)	"Alone No More" (2015)

"Wish You Were Mine" is the debut single by English producer Philip George. It samples the Stevie Wonder song "My Cherie Amour". It was released on 26 December 2014 as a digital download in the United Kingdom through 3 Beat Productions. The song peaked at number 2 on the UK Singles Chart, remaining there for three consecutive weeks.

== Chart performance ==
"Wish You Were Mine" spent three weeks at number two on the UK Singles Chart, held off by Mark Ronson and Bruno Mars' "Uptown Funk".

== Music video ==
A music video to accompany the release of "Wish You Were Mine" was first released onto YouTube on 25 December 2014 at a total length of three minutes and twenty-five seconds. In the video, George plays a tenant, a bus driver, a policeman and a shopkeeper. The music video was filmed in Teaneck, New Jersey.

== Formats and track listings ==
Digital download – Single
No.	Title	Length
1.	"Wish You Were Mine"	2:57

Digital Download – Single (Extended Mix)
No.	Title	Length
1.	"Wish You Were Mine" (Extended Mix)	5:18

Digital download – Remixes
No.	Title	Length
1.	"Wish You Were Mine" (DJ S.K.T Remix)	4:44
2.	"Wish You Were Mine" (DJ S.K.T Dub Mix)	4:44
3.	"Wish You Were Mine" (Mandal and Forbes Remix)	5:58
4.	"Wish You Were Mine" (Wide Awake Remix)	3:46

Digital Download – Remixes Part Two
No.	Title	Length
1.	"Wish You Were Mine" (Dexcell Remix)	4:32
2.	"Wish You Were Mine" (Hollaphonic Remix)	4:37

== Charts ==
=== Weekly charts ===
Chart (2015)	Peak position
Australia (ARIA)	20
Austria (Ö3 Austria Top 40)	16
Belgium (Ultratop 50 Flanders)	47
Belgium (Ultratip Bubbling Under Wallonia)	15
Euro Digital Song Sales (Billboard)	2
France (SNEP)	67
Germany (GfK)	6
Ireland (IRMA)	8
Poland Airplay (ZPAV)	7
Poland Dance (ZPAV)	29
Poland (Video Chart)	2
Scottish Singles Sales (Official Charts)	2
Slovenia (SloTop50)	46
Sweden Heatseeker (Sverigetopplistan)	5
Switzerland (Schweizer Hitparade)	37
UK Singles (Official Charts)	2
UK Dance (Official Charts)	1
US Dance Club Songs (Billboard)	4

=== Year-end charts ===
Chart (2015)	Position
Germany (Official German Charts)	53
Poland (ZPAV)	28
UK Singles (Official Charts Company)	28

== Certifications ==
Certifications for "Wish You Were Mine"
Region	Certification	Certified units/sales
Australia (ARIA)	Gold	35,000^{‡}
Denmark (IFPI Danmark)	Gold	45,000^{‡}
Germany (BVMI)	Gold	200,000^{‡}
New Zealand (RMNZ)	Gold	15,000^{‡}
Sweden (GLF)	Gold	20,000^{‡}
United Kingdom (BPI)	2× Platinum	633,933
^{‡} Sales+streaming figures based on certification alone.

== Release history ==
Region	Date	Format	Label
Ireland	26 December 2014	Digital download	3 Beat Productions
United Kingdom	28 December 2014	Digital download	3 Beat Productions
