= Outlines (song) =

Single by Mike Mago and Dragonette
- Released: 29 August 2014
- Recorded: 2014
- Genre: Future house
- Length: 4:33
- Label: Armada Music
- Songwriters: Mike Mago; Martina Sorbara; Matt Schwartz; Paul Harris
- Producers: Mike Mago; Martina Sorbara; Matt Schwartz; Paul Harris

Mike Mago singles chronology
"Man Hands" (2014)	"Outlines" (2014)	"What a Love" (2015)

Dragonette singles chronology
"My Legs" (2013)	"Outlines" (2014)	"The Best" (2015)

"Outlines" is a song recorded by Dutch record producer and DJ Mike Mago and Canadian synth-pop group Dragonette. It was released as a single on 29 August 2014 through Armada Music (formerly Spinnin' Records).

== Music video ==
The music video for "Outlines" premiered on 15 August 2014. The video shows a blurred young woman in a leotard dancing inside an abandoned building. While the woman dances, she produces outlines of herself that show her previous dance moves.

== Track listings ==
- Digital download
1. "Outlines" – 4:33
- Digital download (Radio Edit)
1. "Outlines" (Radio Edit) – 2:56
- Canadian digital download
1. "Outlines" – 4:33
2. "Outlines" (Radio Edit) – 2:56
- Digital download (The Remixes)
1. "Outlines" (Redondo Remix) – 6:14
2. "Outlines" (Richie Romano Remix) – 4:00
3. "Outlines" (Shapes Remix) – 6:53
- Dutch digital EP (The UK Remixes)
1. "Outlines" (Chris Lorenzo Remix) – 6:16
2. "Outlines" (Cyantific Remix) – 4:28
3. "Outlines" (Steve Smart Remix) – 4:33
4. "Outlines" (Zoo Station Remix) – 5:28
- UK digital download (Radio Edit)
1. "Outlines" (Radio Edit) – 3:04
- UK digital EP (Remixes)
1. "Outlines" (Cyantific Remix) – 4:28
2. "Outlines" (Chris Lorenzo Remix) – 6:16
3. "Outlines" (Zoo Station Remix) – 5:28
4. "Outlines" (Steve Smart Remix) – 4:33
5. "Outlines" (Richie Romano Remix) – 4:00
6. "Outlines" (Extended Mix) – 4:17
- German digital EP (Remixes)
1. "Outlines" (Radio Edit) – 2:57
2. "Outlines" (Richie Romano Remix) – 3:58
3. "Outlines" (Shapes Remix) – 6:53
4. "Outlines" (Instrumental) – 4:32
- Digital download (Zonderling Remix)
1. "Outlines" (Zonderling Remix) – 3:47

== Charts ==
=== Weekly charts ===
Chart (2014–2015)	Peak position
Belgium (Ultratop 50 Flanders)	18
Belgium (Ultratip Bubbling Under Wallonia)	3
Canada (Canadian Hot 100)	47
Ireland (IRMA)	77
Netherlands (Dutch Top 40)	20
Netherlands (Single Top 100)	26
Scottish Singles Sales (Official Charts)	6
UK Singles (Official Charts)	8
UK Dance (Official Charts)	2
UK Indie (Official Charts)	1

=== Year-end charts ===
Chart (2014)	Position
Netherlands (Dutch Top 40)	76
Netherlands (Single Top 100)	76

== Certifications ==
Region	Certification	Certified units/sales
United Kingdom (BPI)	Silver	200,000^{‡}
^{‡} Sales+streaming figures based on certification alone.

== Release history ==
Region	Date	Format	Version	Label	Ref.
Netherlands	29 August 2014	Digital download	Original; Radio Edit	Spinnin'	
United States	29 August 2014	Digital download	Radio Edit	Spinnin'	
United States	1 September 2014	Digital download	Original	Spinnin'	
Canada	27 October 2014	Digital download	Original	Spinnin'	
Netherlands	9 January 2015	Digital download	The Remixes	Spinnin'	
Netherlands	9 January 2015	Digital EP	The UK Remixes	Spinnin'	
United States	9 January 2015	Digital download	The Remixes	Spinnin'	
United Kingdom	1 February 2015	Digital download	Radio Edit	Ministry of Sound	
United Kingdom	1 February 2015	Digital EP	Remixes	Ministry of Sound	
Germany	13 March 2015	Digital EP	Remixes	B1	
Netherlands	24 April 2015	Digital download	Zonderling Remix	Spinnin'	
United States	24 April 2015	Digital download	Zonderling Remix	Spinnin'	
Canada	2 June 2015	Digital download	Zonderling Remix	Spinnin'	
