= House Every Weekend =

Single by David Zowie
- Released: 3 July 2015
- Genre: Deep house
- Length: 3:02 (radio edit); 4:56 (original mix)
- Label: Virgin EMI
- Songwriters: David Zowie; Zack Toms
- Producer: David Zowie

David Zowie singles chronology
"House Every Weekend" (2015)	"The Real Don" (2017)

"House Every Weekend" is the debut single from British DJ David Zowie. It was released on 3 July 2015 by Virgin EMI Records.

== Background ==
Zowie produced the embryo of the song in his studio after finding the vocal among some a cappellas on his PC from a Nervous Records vinyl. The vocalist initially sang about being trapped in the house during the weekend; Zowie flipped the lyrics to create a more positive scenario, with the intent of writing a feel-good track. Zowie first played the track at a house party with friends. A DJ at the party asked for a copy of the record, and in turn played it in his sets. This was subsequently picked up by other DJs, who used it as a warm-up track, and it was played at clubs and events such as Egg, Defected and Audio Rehab. It was then picked up by The Magician and Alex Metric, who used it on their American tours, which in turn brought it to the attention of Pete Tong and Annie Mac, who subsequently used it on their BBC Radio 1 shows.

== Commercial performance ==
On 8 July 2015, the Official Charts Company announced that "House Every Weekend" was number one in the Official Chart Update, and was scheduled to be the Official Charts Company's first Friday number one (they moved the date the chart was announced from Sunday to Friday, giving it five days of sales that week) since 1960. Prior to being released, the song had made it to number 52 entirely on streams, debuting at number 80. On 10 July, the song topped the UK Singles Chart, beating "Shine" by Years & Years by fewer than 1,000 copies.

== Music video ==
The song's music video has been described as "a heartfelt paean to an underground scene that holds the dance as a means of expression as well as a movement". Visuals for the track were produced by CRYbaby Media.

== Track listings ==
Digital download – single
No.	Title	Length
1.	"House Every Weekend" (radio edit)	3:02

Digital download – EP
No.	Title	Length
1.	"House Every Weekend"	4:56
2.	"House Every Weekend" (LuvBug remix)	4:49
3.	"House Every Weekend" (Après remix)	6:22
4.	"House Every Weekend" (Nick Olivetti remix)	5:43

Digital download – Remixes, Pt. II
No.	Title	Length
1.	"House Every Weekend" (Nero remix)	4:44
2.	"House Every Weekend" (Mike Mago remix)	4:44
3.	"House Every Weekend" (Danny Howard remix)	5:07
4.	"House Every Weekend" (Mandal & Forbes remix)	7:08
5.	"House Every Weekend" (Louie Anderson remix)	5:51
6.	"House Every Weekend" (Loadstar remix)	3:55

== Charts and certifications ==
=== Weekly charts ===
Chart (2015)	Peak position
Australia (ARIA)	64
Belgium (Ultratip Bubbling Under Flanders)	14
Hungary (Single Top 40)	36
Ireland (IRMA)	19
Scottish Singles Sales (Official Charts)	4
UK Singles (Official Charts)	1
UK Dance (Official Charts)	1

=== Certifications ===
Region	Certification	Certified units/sales
New Zealand (RMNZ)	Platinum	30,000^{‡}
United Kingdom (BPI)	2× Platinum	1,200,000^{‡}
^{‡} Sales+streaming figures based on certification alone.

=== Year-end charts ===
Chart (2015)	position
UK Singles (Official Charts Company)	49

== Release history ==
Country	Date	Format	Label
Ireland	3 July 2015	Digital download	Virgin EMI
United Kingdom	5 July 2015	Digital download	Virgin EMI

== See also ==
- List of UK Singles Chart number ones of 2015
- List of UK Dance Singles Chart number ones of 2015
