= Be Right There =

Single by Diplo and Sleepy Tom

from the album The Warriors Gate (Original Motion Picture Soundtrack)
- Released: August 28, 2015
- Genre: Future house
- Length: 3:57
- Label: Mad Decent; Because
- Songwriters: Thomas Pentz; Cameron Tatham; Vassal Benford; Ronald Spearman
- Producers: Diplo; Sleepy Tom

Diplo singles chronology
"Doctor Pepper" (2015)	"Be Right There" (2015)	"To Ü" (2015)

Sleepy Tom singles chronology
"Be Right There" (2015)

"Be Right There" is a song recorded by producers Diplo and Sleepy Tom, featuring uncredited vocals from Priscilla Renea (now known professionally as Muni Long). It incorporates lyrics from the 1992 song "Don't Walk Away" by Jade. The song was also featured in the Chinese-French action-adventure film The Warriors Gate and in the soundtrack of the 2016 video game Forza Horizon 3.

== Music video ==
The song's accompanying music video premiered on December 17, 2015, on Mad Decent's YouTube account.

== Charts ==
=== Weekly charts ===
Chart (2015–16)	Peak position
Australia (ARIA)	34
Belgium (Ultratop 50 Flanders)	19
Belgium (Ultratop 50 Wallonia)	48
Canada Hot 100 (Billboard)	81
Czech Republic Singles Digital (ČNS IFPI)	55
France (SNEP)	123
Germany (GfK)	69
Ireland (IRMA)	31
Netherlands (Single Top 100)	83
New Zealand (Recorded Music NZ)	19
Scottish Singles Sales (Official Charts)	7
Slovakia Airplay (ČNS IFPI)	32
Slovakia Singles Digital (ČNS IFPI)	55
Sweden (Sverigetopplistan)	91
UK Singles (Official Charts)	8
UK Dance (Official Charts)	2
US Bubbling Under Hot 100 (Billboard)	7
US Dance Club Songs (Billboard)	33
US Hot Dance/Electronic Songs (Billboard)	8
US Pop Airplay (Billboard)	34
US Rhythmic Airplay (Billboard)	35

=== Year-end charts ===
Chart (2015)	Position
US Hot Dance/Electronic Songs (Billboard)	76
Chart (2016)	Position
US Hot Dance/Electronic Songs (Billboard)	32

== Certifications ==
Region	Certification	Certified units/sales
Belgium (BRMA)	Gold	10,000^{‡}
Denmark (IFPI Danmark)	Gold	45,000^{‡}
New Zealand (RMNZ)	2× Platinum	60,000^{‡}
United Kingdom (BPI)	Platinum	600,000^{‡}
United States (RIAA)	Platinum	1,000,000^{‡}
^{‡} Sales+streaming figures based on certification alone.
