= Sleepy Tom =

Canadian DJ and music producer

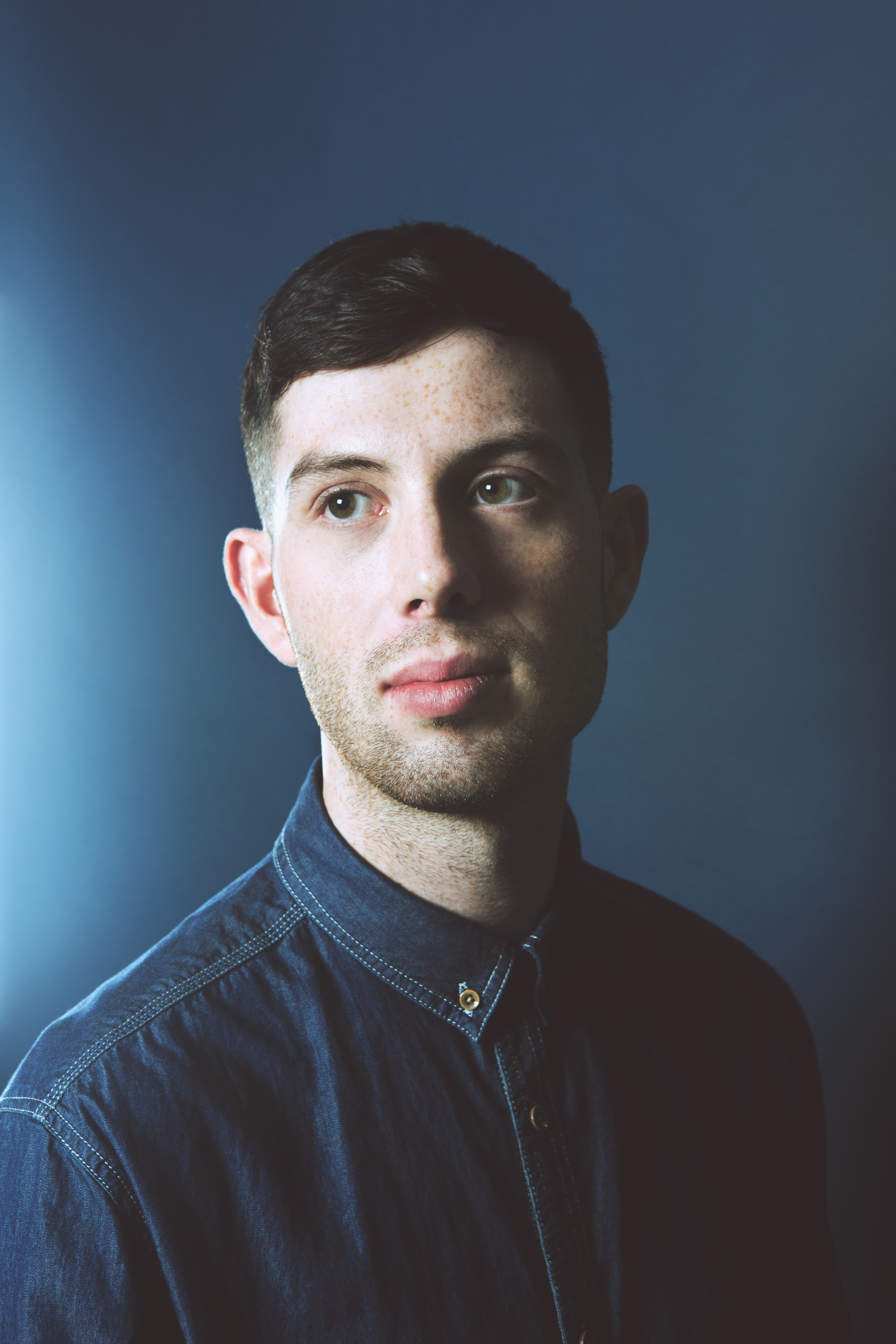

Background information
- Born: Cameron Thomas Tatham; Squamish, British Columbia, Canada
- Genres: Dance
- Occupations: DJ; music producer
- Years active: 2009–present
- Labels: Fool's Gold; Mad Decent; Spinnin'
- Website: sleepytomofficial.com

Cam Tatham, known by his stage name Sleepy Tom, is a Canadian DJ and music producer. He released his first EP The Currency on Fool's Gold Records in March 2013. The music video for lead track, "The Currency", debuted on Rolling Stone's website. In August 2014, he played at the fifth annual Squamish Valley Music Festival. The Vancouver-based producer and DJ went on to remix tracks for some of the heavier hitters of the EDM scene at that time, like Zeds Dead, Martin Solveig, and Diplo, who collaborated with Sleepy Tom to score the Platinum certified UK hit "Be Right There" in 2015.

== Discography ==
=== Extended plays ===
- The Currency (2013)
- Amateurs (2019)
- This Thing Called Life (2023)

== Awards ==
=== Much Music Video Awards ===
Year	Nominee/work	Award	Result
2017	"Seeing Double" (featuring Tonye)	Best Post-Production	Won

=== Juno Awards ===
Year	Nominee/work	Award	Result
2016	"Be Right There" (with Diplo)	Dance Recording of the Year	Nominated
