= Anton Powers =

English DJ and record producer

- Born: 30 August 1981 (age 44)
- Origin: Liverpool, England
- Genres: Dance
- Occupations: DJ; record producer; radio presenter
- Years active: 2001–present
- Labels: 3 Beat Productions, Spinnin' Records
- Member of: Cahill

Anton Powers is an English DJ, music industry executive, record producer, and radio presenter. His work includes songs "Alone No More" (a collaboration with DJ Philip George) and "Baby" (feat. Pixie Lott). Powers also played a role in founding the remix group Cahill.

== Career ==
Powers was raised in Liverpool. He began his career in 2001 manning a slot on Juice FM, before moving onto Radio City 96.7 in 2011 and Capital FM in 2015. In the interim, he formed the group Cahill (named after Everton FC player Tim Cahill) with Scott Rosser and Tim Condran. Cahill had a series of releases including "Trippin' on You" (UK #25), "Crush on You", and "Sex Shooter". They became well known for their remixes and were commissioned to remix for Lady Gaga, Rihanna, Kylie Minogue, Nicole Scherzinger, Ellie Goulding, Selena Gomez, Olly Murs, and Mariah Carey.

Powers has performed internationally at events such as Creamfields, Tomorrowland, Amnesia, Ruby Skye, and Zero Gravity. He was voted Liverpool DJ of the Year by the Liverpool Echo in 2009, 2010, and 2012, and was named the same in 2013 by the Liverpool City Council. He also runs the A&R for record label 3 Beat Productions, which includes acts such as Sigma, Kungs, Fuse ODG, Philip George, and Pixie Lott. He was responsible for their signing and the release of a number of hit singles.

In 2015, Powers collaborated with fellow DJ Philip George on his debut single "Alone No More", which peaked at No. 4 on the UK Singles Chart. It was awarded gold status in the UK in April 2017. In 2016, Powers released his second single, "Love You Better". His third single, "Baby", featuring Pixie Lott, had its first live performance on the final of the sixth series of The Voice on April 1, 2017. The song peaked at No. 97 on the UK Singles Chart. Later that year, Powers was a guest presenter of The Playlist alongside Lott. His fourth single, "Heart for Sale", was released on February 23, 2018.

In 2022, while working at Warner Music UK, Powers picked up the rights to "Afraid to Feel" by British duo LF System and "B.O.T.A (Badddest Of Them All)" by Eliza Rose and Interplanetary Criminal, with these two tracks taking the Top 2 positions on the Official Singles Chart Top 100 of August 25, 2022.

== Discography ==
=== Singles ===
Title	Year	Peak chart positions			Certifications	Album
Title	Year	UK	IRE	SCO	Certifications	Album
"Alone No More" (with Philip George)	2015	4	65	1	BPI: Platinum	Non-album singles
"Love You Better"	2016	—	—	—		Non-album singles
"Baby" (with Pixie Lott)	2017	97	—	28	BPI: Silver	Non-album singles
Heart for Sale"	2018	—	—	—		Non-album singles
Make Your Move" (with Redondo)	2019	—	—	—	BPI: Silver	Non-album singles
"—" denotes a recording that did not chart or was not released in that territory.
