= Mike Mago =

Dutch DJ

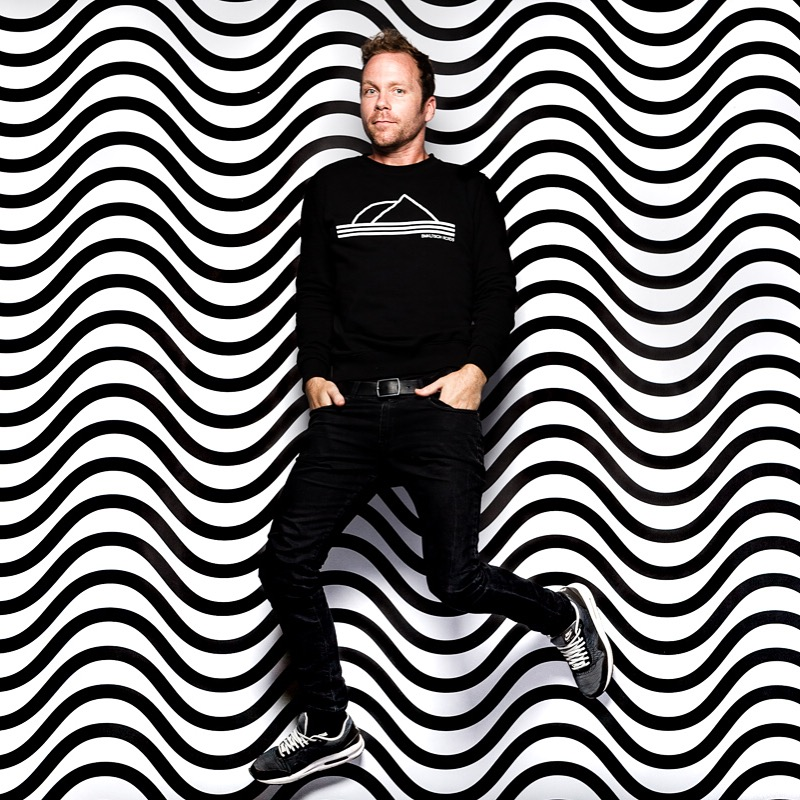

Background information
- Born: Michiel Thomassen; March 12, 1979 (age 46); Utrecht, Netherlands
- Genres: Deep house; electro house; house
- Occupations: DJ; record producer
- Years active: 2009–present
- Labels: BMKLTSCH RCRDS; Spinnin'
- Website: www.mikemago.nl

Michiel Thomassen (born March 12, 1979), known professionally as Mike Mago, is a Dutch DJ and music producer.

== Career ==
In 2010, Mago founded independent dance label BMKLTSCH RCRDS in his hometown of Utrecht, releasing EPs from electronic artists such as Mason.

In 2014, Mago collaborated with the Canadian electropop act Dragonette on the joint single "Outlines" under Spinnin' Records. The song peaked at 26th on the Dutch charts & 18th in Belgium. The song also reached number two on the UK Dance Chart. He has also released a few solo singles, including "The Show", "Man Hands", and "Hey!".

In 2015, Mago performed live at Ministry of Sound in January and Creamfields in August. He returned to Spinnin' Records in August with the single "Deeper Love". Mago currently lives in Amsterdam.

== Discography ==
=== Charting singles ===
Year	Title	Peak chart positions							Album
Year	Title	NED Single Top 100	NED Dutch Top 40	BEL (Fl)	BEL (Wa)	CAN	IRL	UK	Album
2013	"The Show"	—	—	—^{[A]}	—^{[B]}	—	—	—	Non-album singles
2014	"Man Hands"	—	—	—^{[C]}	—	—	—	—	Non-album singles
2014	"Outlines" (with Dragonette)	26	20	18	—^{[D]}	47	77	8	Non-album singles
2015	"Deeper Love"	—	—	—^{[E]}	—	—	—	—	Non-album singles
"—" denotes a recording that did not chart or was not released in that territory.

=== Singles ===
- 2010: Ready for the Action [Subdrive]
- 2010: Don't Give A [Subdrive]
- 2011: Bloem [BMKLTSCH RCRDS]
- 2011: Plant [BMKLTSCH RCRDS]
- 2012: The Power [BMKLTSCH RCRDS]
- 2012: The Soul [BMKLTSCH RCRDS]
- 2012: Galactic [BMKLTSCH RCRDS]
- 2013: Hold On [Blood Music]
- 2013: The Beat [Blood Music]
- 2013: The Show [Spinnin Deep (Spinnin)]
- 2014: Man Hands [Spinnin Deep (Spinnin)]
- 2014: Outlines (with Dragonette) [Spinnin Records]
- 2015: What a Love [BMKLTSCH RCRDS]
- 2015: Meant to Be (with Rogerseventytwo) [BMKLTSCH RCRDS]
- 2015: Deeper Love [Spinnin Records]
- 2016: Daylight (with KC Lights) [Spinnin Records]
- 2016: Higher (with Leon Lour) [Spinnin Deep (Spinnin)]
- 2016: Secret Stash (with Dragonette) [Hexagon (Spinnin)]
- 2016: Wasted So Much Of My Life [BMKLTSCH RCRDS]
- 2017: One In A Trillion (with DiRTY RADiO) [Spinnin Records]
- 2017: Remedy (with Tom Ferry, ILY) [BMKLTSCH RCRDS]
- 2018: Always On My Mind (with Dog Collective) [Spinnin Records]

=== Remixes ===
- 2009: DJ Rockid – Badmen (Mike Mago Remix) [Foktop!]
- 2009: Future Flash – Old School (Mike Mago Remix) [Idiot House Records]
- 2011: DJ Kypski – Satisfaction (Mike Mago Remix) [BMKLTSCH RCRDS]
- 2011: Electrophants – Sledgehammer (Mike Mago Remix) [BMKLTSCH RCRDS]
- 2011: Starski – Sunstruck (Mike Mago & Bart B More Remix) [BMKLTSCH]
- 2011: No Body – We Speak American (Mike Mago remix) [BMKLTSCH RCRDS]
- 2011: Bart B More, Rubix – Ari (Mike Mago Remix) [BMKLTSCH RCRDS]
- 2011: Rob Threezy, Lazy Ants – Chi To Rome (Mike Mago Remix) [BMKLTSCH RCRDS]
- 2012: Disco Of Doom – Conkers (Mike Mago Remix) [Discobelle Records]
- 2012: Hidden Cat, RipTide – Space (Mike Mago Remix) [BMKLTSCH RCRDS]
- 2013: Ben Mono, Lars Moston – Unison (Mike Mago Remix) [Tracy Recordings]
- 2013: The Kite String Tangle – Commotion (Mike Mago Remix) [October Records]
- 2013: Magic Eye – Inside My Love (Mike Mago Remix) [Strictly Rhythm]
- 2013: A.N.D.Y., Nyemiah Supreme – Pump It Up (Mike Mago Remix) [Smile]
- 2013: Hateless – It Must Be Love (Mike Mago Remix) [d:vision]
- 2014: Wilkinson – Dirty Love (Mike Mago Remix) [Virgin EMI]
- 2015: Avicii – The Nights (Mike Mago Remix) [PRMD Music]
- 2015: Kraak & Smaak – Mountain Top (Mike Mago Remix) [Spinnin' Remixes]
- 2015: Feiertag, David Dam – Damn You (Mike Mago Remix) [BMKLTSCH]
- 2015: Tai, Mike Mago, Watermat, Becky Hill – All My Love (Remix) [Spinnin' Remixes]
