= Philip George (DJ) =

English disc jockey and record producer (born 1993)

- Born: Philip George Woodhead; 13 June 1993 (age 32)
- Origin: Nottingham, England
- Genres: House; deep house
- Occupations: DJ; record producer
- Years active: 2014–present
- Labels: LazyBoy Productions

Philip George (born Philip George Woodhead on 13 June 1993) is an English DJ and record producer from Nottingham. Philip George attended a secondary school in Chilwell, Nottingham. He is best known for his 2014 single "Wish You Were Mine", which peaked at number 2 on the UK Singles Chart. A second single featuring Anton Powers entitled "Alone No More" was released on 2 October 2015. The song entered the charts at number 4, becoming George's second top 10 single in the UK.

He had his own show on KISS FM from 12 am to 1 am every Thursday, featuring primarily mixed House beats. The show stopped in 2018.

== Career ==
=== 2010–2014: Liquid drum & bass ===
Philip George first released music in 2010 under the alias Woody. These tracks first showed up on Dutch label Liquicity. In 2012, MrSuicideSheep's YouTube channel uploaded "Since Then". Around 2014, George started shifting his core genre from liquid drum and bass to house.

=== 2014–present: Breakthrough ===
On 28 December 2014, George released his debut single "Wish You Were Mine". The song samples the 1969 Stevie Wonder song "My Cherie Amour". On 4 January 2015, the song entered the UK Singles Chart at number two, held off number one by Mark Ronson & Bruno Mars' "Uptown Funk". His second single "Alone No More" was released on 2 October 2015. The song became his second top 5 single in the UK, debuting at number 4.

== Discography ==
=== Singles ===
Title	Year	Peak chart positions										Certifications	Album
Title	Year	UK	UK Dance	AUS	AUT	BEL	FRA	GER	IRE	SCO	SWI	Certifications	Album
"Wish You Were Mine"	2014	2	1	20	16	47	67	6	8	2	37	BPI: 2× Platinum; ARIA: Gold; BVMI: Gold	Non-album singles
"Alone No More" (with Anton Powers)	2015	4	1	—	—	62	—	—	65	1	—	BPI: Platinum	Non-album singles
"Feel This Way" (with Dragonette)	2016	136	30	—	—	—	—	—	—	—	—		Non-album singles
"Losing My Mind" (featuring Saint Raymond)	2017	—	—	—	—	—	—	—	—	—	—		Non-album singles
"Same Love" (with Salena Mastroianni)	2020	—	—	—	—	—	—	—	—	—	—		Non-album singles
"—" denotes a recording that did not chart or was not released in that territory.
