= David Zowie =

British DJ and producer

- Born: David Zowie Canada Batt; 30 April 1981 (age 44); Chatham, Kent, England
- Genres: Deep house
- Occupations: DJ; record producer
- Years active: 1993–present
- Labels: Positiva; Virgin EMI

David Zowie Canada Batt (born 30 April 1981), known professionally as David Zowie, is an English DJ and record producer. He is best known for his song "House Every Weekend", which topped the UK Singles Chart in July 2015.

== Biography ==
=== Early life and career beginnings ===
Zowie was born in Chatham, Kent. He has stated that he was named after David Bowie, as his father was a huge fan, and was once called "David Zowie Ziggy Stardust Aladdin Sane Thin White Duke Twig The Wonder Kid" before his mother changed his name by deed poll. Zowie started producing music at age 12, when he bought a pair of wooden decks and then SoundLabs, commencing production when he was 14. Two years later he bought a pair of Technics SL-1200 from a club he was playing at. He has also operated using an Atari ST.

=== 2015–present: breakthrough ===
Zowie is best known for his 2015 song "House Every Weekend", which topped the UK Singles Chart, having debuted at number 80 and made its way to number 52 entirely based on streams. On 8 July 2015, the Official Charts Company announced that it was number one on the Official Chart Update, and was scheduled to be the UK's first Friday number one in 55 years (they moved the date the chart was announced from Sunday to Friday, giving it five days of sales).

The song reached the top spot of the UK Singles Chart on 10 July 2015, and that same day, it debuted at number 62 on the Irish Singles Chart. The record also topped the UK Dance Singles Chart and eventually reached a peak of number 19 on the Irish Singles Chart.

== Discography ==
=== Singles ===
Year	Title	Peak chart positions				Album
Year	Title	UK	AUS	BEL	IRL	Album
2015	"House Every Weekend"	1	64	64	19	Non-album singles
2017	"The Real Don"	–	–	–	–	Non-album singles
2018	"Trippin' on Me" (with Mark Morrison)	–	–	–	–	Non-album singles
