= Be Alone No More =

1998 single by Another Level

Single by Another Level featuring Jay-Z

from the album Another Level
- Released: 16 February 1998
- Recorded: 1997
- Genre: R&B
- Length: 4:02
- Label: Northwestside
- Songwriters: Steven Dubin; Andrea Martin; Ivan Matias
- Producer: Cutfather & Joe

Another Level singles chronology
"Be Alone No More" (1998)	"Freak Me" (1998)

Jay-Z singles chronology
"The City Is Mine" (1998)	"Be Alone No More" (1998)	"Wishing on a Star" (1998)

Music video
- "Be Alone No More" on YouTube

"Be Alone No More" is the debut single by British R&B vocal quartet Another Level, released on 16 February 1998 by Northwestside Records. It is from their eponymous debut album (1998), and features American rapper Jay-Z. The song was written by Steven Dubin, Andrea Martin and Ivan Matias. In 1999, it was released a second time in remix form together with a cover of the Simply Red song "Holding Back the Years". The two releases peaked at number six and number eleven in the UK respectively. Several UK garage remixes were also released, such as the 'Dubmonsters Mix' and 'Another Groove Mix'. The latter is a mashup with Double 99's "RipGroove".

== Critical reception ==
A reviewer from Music Week gave "Be Alone No More" four out of five, writing, "This time last year, Public Demand were the new UK R&B hopefuls, but failed to make an impact. This year's contenders debut with a delicious ballad and could reach a higher level." Claudia Connell from News of the World declared it "a superb debut single which blends hip-hop and R&B with sophisticated, soulful harmonies."

== Track listing ==
1. "Be Alone No More" (C&J Radio Mix) – 4:02
2. "Be Alone No More" (Blacksmith Skate & Roll Mix) – 5:28
3. "Be Alone No More" (Another Groove Mix) – 6:10
4. "Be Alone No More" (Blacksmith's R'n'B Radio Rub) – 6:21

== Personnel ==
- Steven Dubin – songwriting
- Andrea Martin – songwriting
- Ivan Matias – songwriting
- Cutfather & Joe – production
- Joe Belmaati – keyboard, programming, engineering
- Tue Röh – Rhodes piano
- Bernard Löhr – engineering
- Ramus – engineering assistant

== Charts ==
=== Weekly charts ===
1998 weekly chart performance for "Be Alone No More"
Chart (1998)	Position
Australia (ARIA)	165
Europe (Eurochart Hot 100)	46
New Zealand (Recorded Music NZ)	27
Poland Airplay (Music & Media)	18
Scottish Singles Sales (Official Charts)	31
UK Singles (Official Charts)	6
UK Airplay (Music Week)	19
UK Hip Hop/R&B (Official Charts)	1

1999 weekly chart performance for "Be Alone No More"/"Holding Back the Years"
Chart (1999)	Position
Spain Airplay (Top 40 Radio)	40
UK Singles (OCC)	11
UK Airplay (Music Week)	36

=== Year-end charts ===
1998 year-end chart performance for "Be Alone No More"
Chart (1998)	Position
Brazil (Crowley)	64
UK Singles (OCC)	112
UK Urban (Music Week)	14

1999 year-end chart performance for "Be Alone No More"
Chart (1999)	Position
Romania (Romanian Top 100)	97
UK Singles (OCC)	165
UK Club Chart (Music Week)	26
UK Pop (Music Week)	19

== Certifications ==
Region	Certification	Certified units/sales
United Kingdom (BPI)	Silver	200,000^{‡}
^{‡} Sales+streaming figures based on certification alone.

== Philip George and Anton Powers version ==
"Alone No More"

Single by Philip George and Anton Powers
- Released: 30 September 2015
- Recorded: 2015
- Genre: Deep house
- Length: 2:53
- Label: 3 Beat Productions
- Songwriters: Steven Dubin; Andrea Martin; Ivan Matias
- Producers: Philip George; Anton Powers; Scott Rosser; Midnight City

Philip George singles chronology
"Wish You Were Mine" (2014)	"Alone No More" (2015)	"Feel This Way" (2016)

Anton Powers singles chronology
"Alone No More" (2015)	"Love You Better" (2016)

In 2015, "Be Alone No More" was covered by British producers Philip George and Anton Powers, retitled "Alone No More". It debuted at number 4 on the UK Singles Chart, number 1 on the UK Dance Singles Chart and number 1 on the Scottish Singles Chart. It was released on 2 October 2015 as a digital download in the UK through 3 Beat Records.

=== Background ===
Powers had been toying with the idea of remixing "Be Alone No More" for several years and initially started the project with fellow Liverpool producers Midnight City before taking it to 3 Beat label-mate George.

=== Music video ===
A music video to accompany the release of "Alone No More" was first released onto YouTube on 10 September 2015 at a total length of three minutes and three seconds.

=== Track listings ===
Digital download – Single
No.	Title	Length
1.	"Alone No More"	2:53

Digital download - Single (Extended Mix)
No.	Title	Length
1.	"Alone No More" (Extended Mix)	4:17

Digital download – Remixes
No.	Title	Length
1.	"Alone No More" (Danny Bond Remix)	5:39
2.	"Alone No More" (Midnight City Remix)	4:28
3.	"Alone No More" (Ferreck Dawn Remix)	5:32
4.	"Alone No More" (Ferreck Dawn Vocal Dub)	5:32
5.	"Alone No More" (DubRocca Remix)	4:58
6.	"Alone No More" (George Whyman Remix)	5:12
7.	"Alone No More" (Etherwood Remix)	5:13
8.	"Alone No More" (PBD & Jack Shizzle Remix)	4:45
9.	"Alone No More" (Tom Zanetti & K.O. Kane Remix)	4:46
10.	"Alone No More" (Distant Light Remix)	2:57
11.	"Alone No More" (Dexcell Remix)	5:06
12.	"Alone No More" (Philip George's 5am Mix)	6:27
13.	"Alone No More" (Tazer Remix)	3:35

=== Charts ===
Chart (2015)	Peak Position
Belgium (Ultratop 50 Flanders)	62
Belgium (Ultratop 50 Wallonia)	63
Ireland (IRMA)	65
Scottish Singles Sales (Official Charts)	1
UK Dance (Official Charts)	1
UK Singles (Official Charts)	4
US Dance Club Songs (Billboard)	4

=== Certifications ===
Region	Certification	Certified units/sales
United Kingdom (BPI)	Platinum	600,000^{‡}
^{‡} Sales+streaming figures based on certification alone.

=== Release history ===
Region	Date	Format	Label
Ireland	30 September 2015	Digital download	3 Beat Productions
United Kingdom	2 October 2015	Digital download	3 Beat Productions
