= List of UK Country Albums Chart number ones of 2015 =

These are the Official Charts Company's UK Country Albums Chart number ones of 2015. The chart week runs from Friday to Thursday with the chart-date given as the following Thursday. Chart positions are based the multi-metric consumption of country music in the United Kingdom, blending traditional album sales, track equivalent albums, and streaming equivalent albums. The chart contains 20 positions.

In the iteration of the chart dated 4 January, 747 by Lady Antebellum was at number one, having returned there in the last week of 2014. The album would remain at the top spot for another week, and returned in February for its ninth total week at number one. On 8 March, British duo The Shires charted at the peak with their debut album Brave and remained there for ten consecutive weeks. They would return to the top spot several times over the year, spending a minimum of four consecutive weeks there each time, and ultimately spent thirty three weeks at number one. Kacey Musgraves also spent four consecutive weeks at the chart summit with her second album Pageant Material. Carrie Underwood's Storyteller became her fourth UK country number one, and spent two nonconsecutive weeks in the top spot in October and December. Likewise, Hair Down To My Grass became Hayseed Dixie's fourth number one on the chart when it spent two consecutive weeks in January, while Steve Earle's Terraplane held the top spot for two weeks in February/March, becoming his eighth number one. The final number one of the year was Brave by The Shires.

== Chart history ==
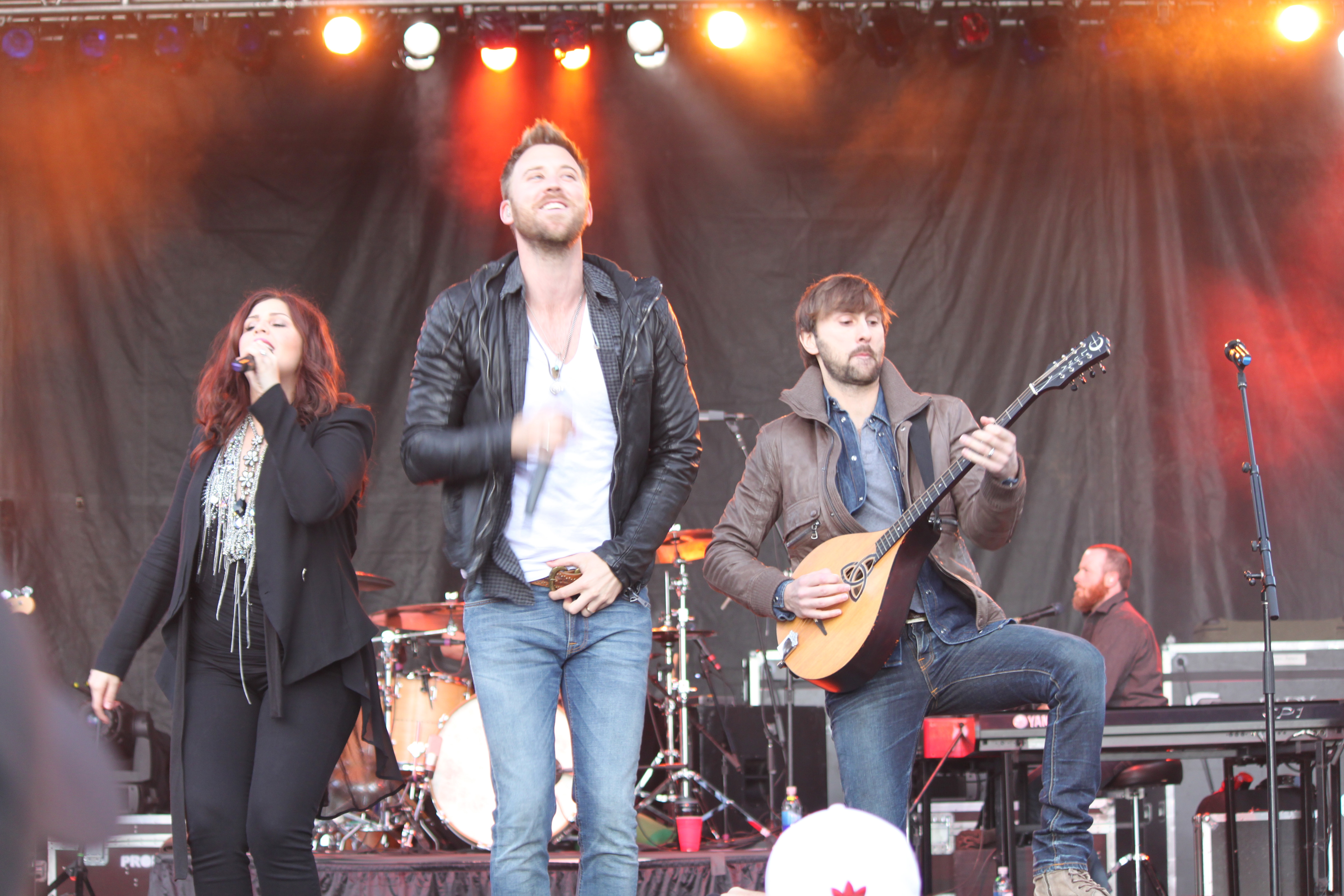
747 became Lady Antebellum's fifth UK number one, and spent three weeks in the top spot.

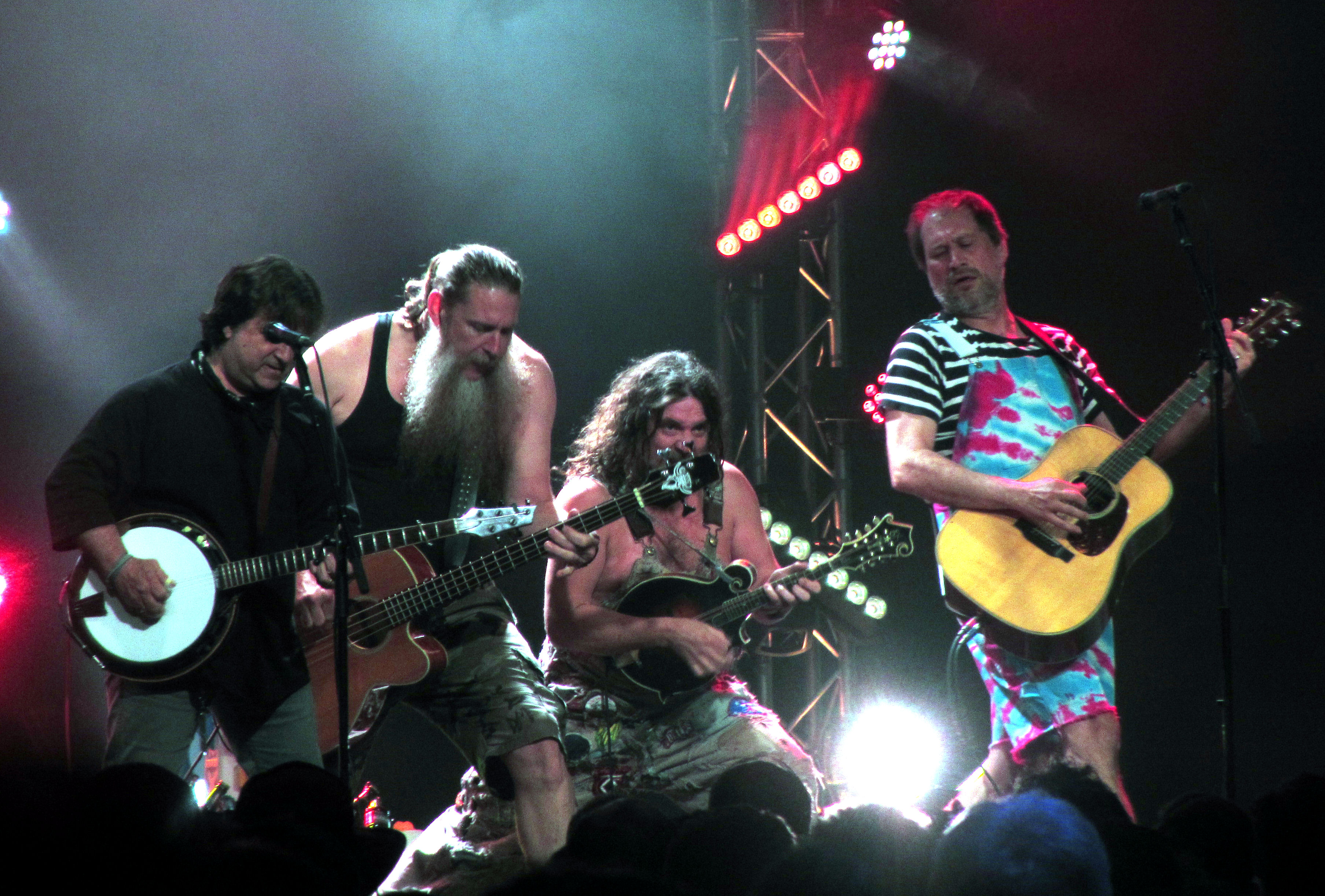
Hayseed Dixie charted at number one for two weeks.

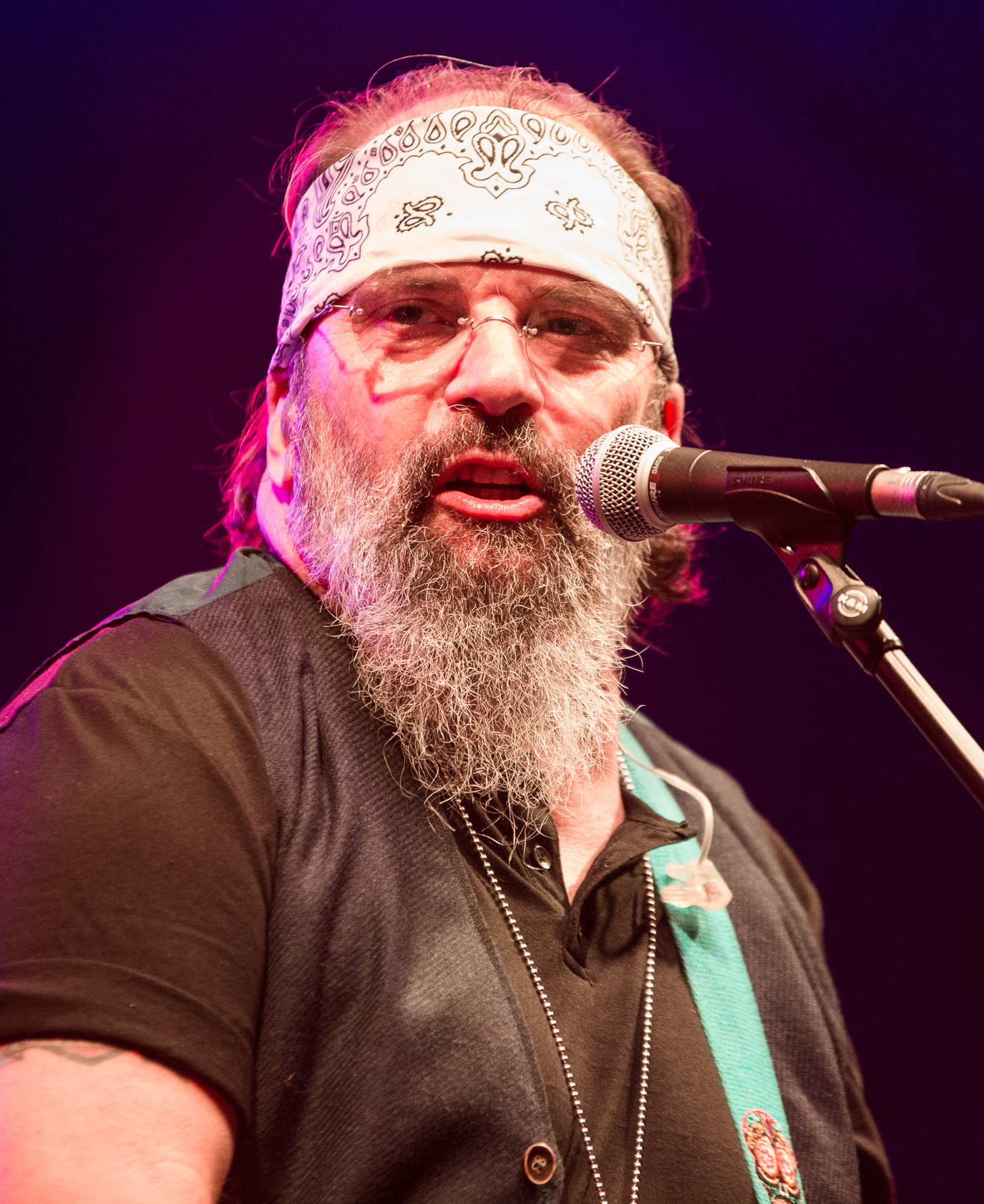
Steve Earle's Terraplane spent two weeks at number one.

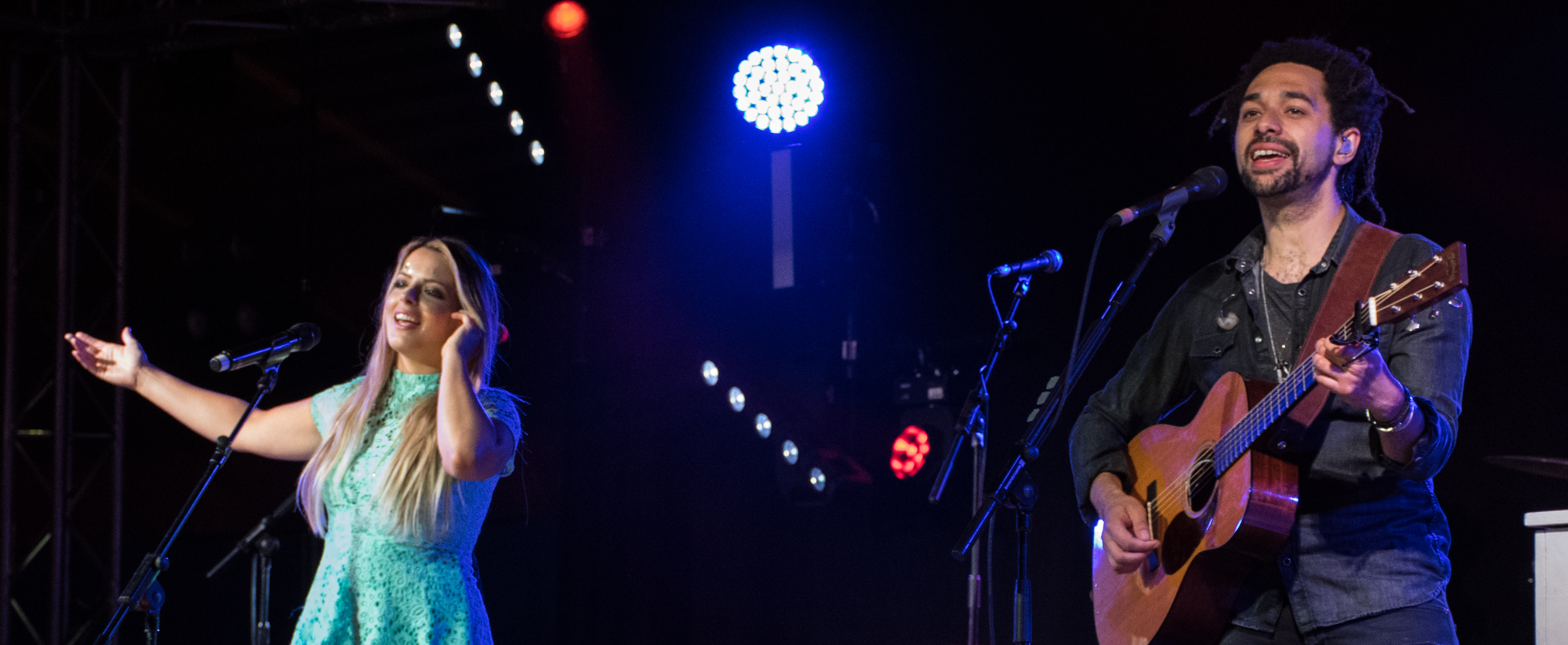
The Shires spent a total of thirty three weeks at number one in 2018 with their debut album Brave.

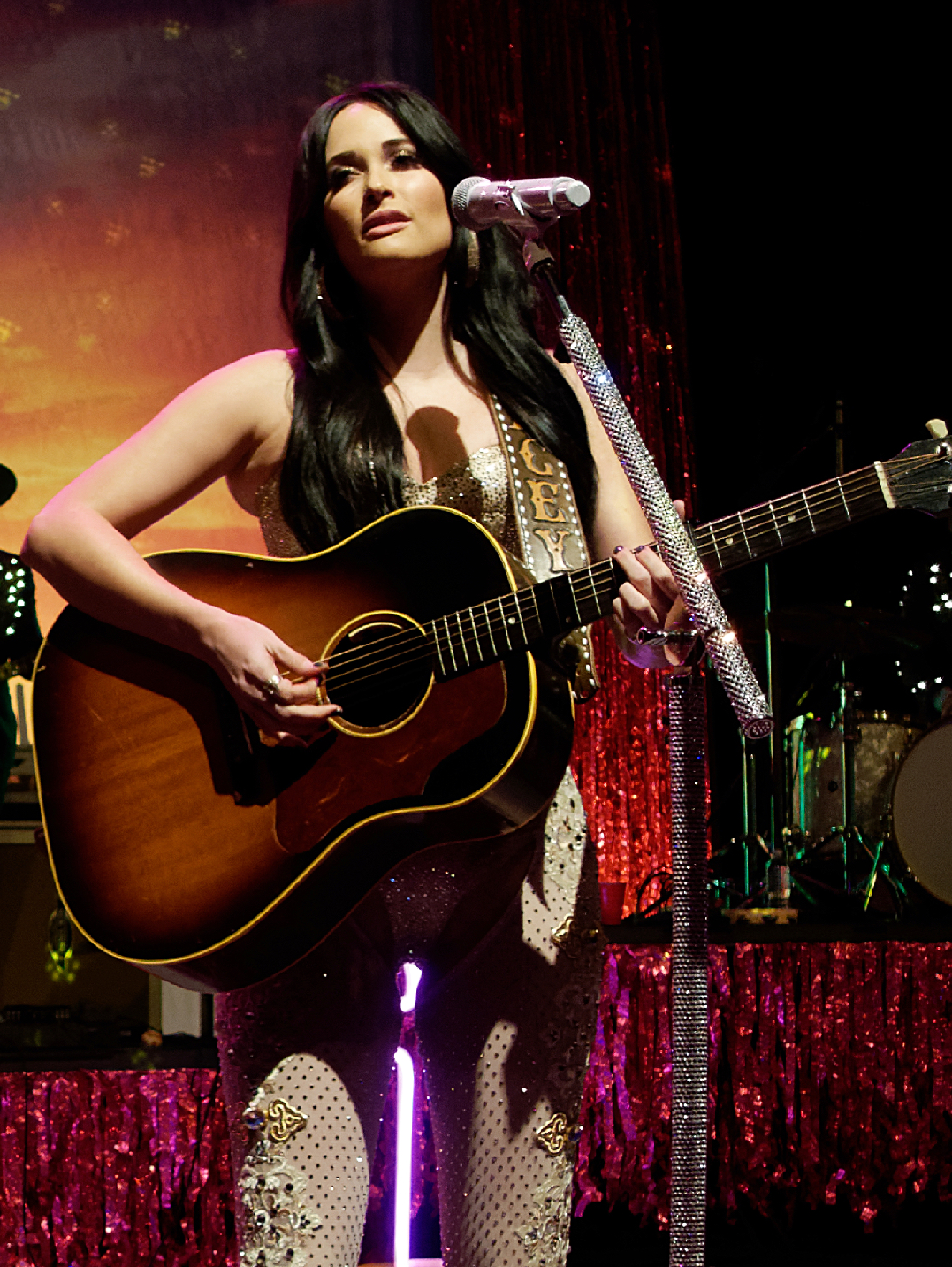
Kacey Musgraves' second studio album Pageant Material held the number one position for four consecutive weeks.

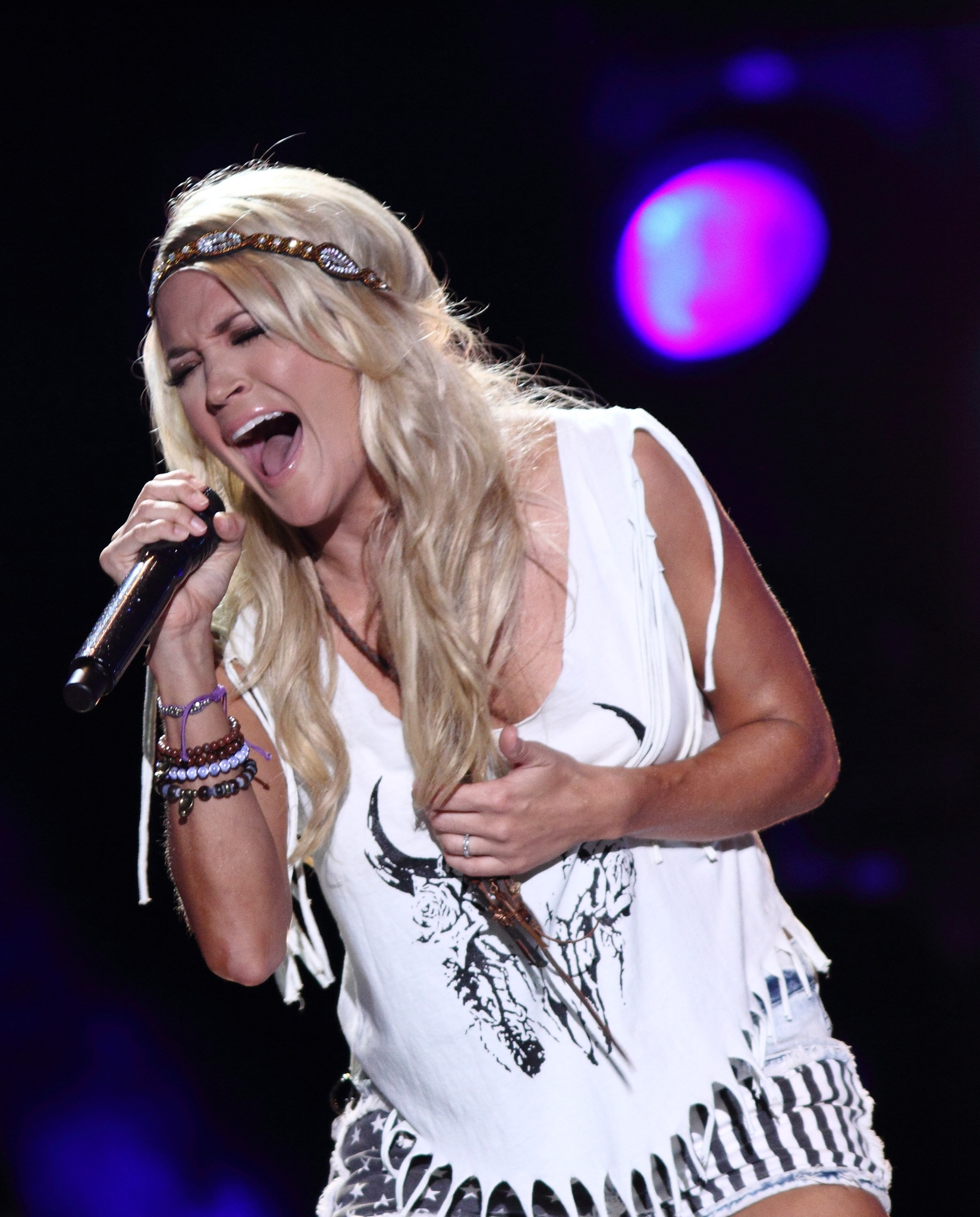
Storyteller became Carrie Underwood's fourth number one album.

Issue date	Album	Artist(s)	Record label	Ref.
4 January	Lady Antebellum	747	Decca	
11 January	Lady Antebellum	747	Decca	
18 January	Hayseed Dixie	Hair Down To My Grass	Hayseed Dixie	
25 January	Hayseed Dixie	Hair Down To My Grass	Hayseed Dixie	
1 February	Brad Paisley	Moonshine in the Trunk	Arista Nashville	
8 February	Lady Antebellum	747	Decca	
22 February	Steve Earle	Terraplane	New West	
1 March	Steve Earle	Terraplane	New West	
8 March	The Shires	Brave	Decca	
15 March	The Shires	Brave	Decca	
22 March	The Shires	Brave	Decca	
29 March	The Shires	Brave	Decca	
5 April	The Shires	Brave	Decca	
12 April	The Shires	Brave	Decca	
19 April	The Shires	Brave	Decca	
26 April	The Shires	Brave	Decca	
3 May	The Shires	Brave	Decca	
10 May	The Shires	Brave	Decca	
17 May	Nathan Carter	Beautiful Life	Decca	
24 May	The Shires	Brave	Decca	
31 May	The Shires	Brave	Decca	
7 June	The Shires	Brave	Decca	
14 June	The Shires	Brave	Decca	
28 June	Kacey Musgraves	Pageant Material	Mercury Nashville	
5 July	Kacey Musgraves	Pageant Material	Mercury Nashville	
10 July	Kacey Musgraves	Pageant Material	Mercury Nashville	
17 July	Kacey Musgraves	Pageant Material	Mercury Nashville	
24 July	Alan Jackson	Angels and Alcohol	DHump Head	
31 July	The Shires	Brave	Decca	
7 August	The Shires	Brave	Decca	
14 August	The Shires	Brave	Decca	
21 August	The Shires	Brave	Decca	
28 August	The Shires	Brave	Decca	
4 September	The Shires	Brave	Decca	
11 September	The Shires	Brave	Decca	
18 September	The Shires	Brave	Decca	
25 September	Dave Rawlings Machine	Nashville Obsolete	Acony	
2 October	The Shires	Brave	Decca	
9 October	The Shires	Brave	Decca	
16 October	The Shires	Brave	Decca	
23 October	The Shires	Brave	Decca	
30 October	Carrie Underwood	Storyteller	19/Arista	
6 November	The Shires	Brave	Decca	
13 November	The Shires	Brave	Decca	
20 November	The Shires	Brave	Decca	
27 November	The Shires	Brave	Decca	
4 December	Carrie Underwood	Storyteller	19/Arista	
11 December	The Shires	Brave	Decca	
18 December	The Shires	Brave	Decca	
25 December	The Shires	Brave	Decca	

== Most weeks at number one ==
Weeks at number one	Artist
33	The Shires
4	Kacey Musgraves
3	Lady Antebellum
2	Carrie Underwood
2	Hayseed Dixie
2	Steve Earle

== See also ==
- List of UK Albums Chart number ones of 2015
- List of UK Dance Singles Chart number ones of 2015
- List of UK Album Downloads Chart number ones of 2015
- List of UK Independent Albums Chart number ones of 2015
- List of UK R&B Albums Chart number ones of 2015
- List of UK Rock & Metal Albums Chart number ones of 2015
- List of UK Compilation Chart number ones of the 2010s
