= List of UK Independent Singles Chart number ones of 2015 =

These are the Official Charts Company's UK Indie Chart number-one singles of 2015.

== Chart history ==
Key
| † | Best-selling indie single of the year |

| Issue date | Single | Artist(s) | Record label | Ref. |
|---|---|---|---|---|
| 3 January | "Got No Fans" | Wealdstone Raider | Wealdstone Records | |
| 10 January | "6 Words" | Wretch 32 | Ministry of Sound | |
| 17 January | "Promesses" | Tchami featuring Kaleem Taylor | Ministry of Sound | |
| 24 January | "Promesses" | Tchami featuring Kaleem Taylor | Ministry of Sound | |
| 31 January | "Promesses" | Tchami featuring Kaleem Taylor | Ministry of Sound | |
| 7 February | "Promesses" | Tchami featuring Kaleem Taylor | Ministry of Sound | |
| 14 February | "Outlines" | Mike Mago featuring Dragonette | Ministry of Sound | |
| 21 February | "Gravity" | DJ Fresh featuring Ella Eyre | Ministry of Sound | |
| 28 February | "Gravity" | DJ Fresh featuring Ella Eyre | Ministry of Sound | |
| 7 March | "Gravity" | DJ Fresh featuring Ella Eyre | Ministry of Sound | |
| 14 March | "Gravity" | DJ Fresh featuring Ella Eyre | Ministry of Sound | |
| 21 March | "Gravity" | DJ Fresh featuring Ella Eyre | Ministry of Sound | |
| 28 March | "Gravity" | DJ Fresh featuring Ella Eyre | Ministry of Sound | |
| 4 April | "Gravity" | DJ Fresh featuring Ella Eyre | Ministry of Sound | |
| 11 April | "Gravity" | DJ Fresh featuring Ella Eyre | Ministry of Sound | |
| 18 April | "Lean On" | Major Lazer and DJ Snake featuring MØ | Because Music | |
| 25 April | "Can't Stop Playing (Makes Me High)" | Dr. Kucho! and Gregor Salto featuring Ane Brun | Ministry Of Sound | |
| 2 May | "Lean On" | Major Lazer and DJ Snake featuring MØ | Because Music | |
| 9 May | "Lean On" | Major Lazer and DJ Snake featuring MØ | Because Music | |
| 16 May | "Lean On" | Major Lazer and DJ Snake featuring MØ | Because Music | |
| 23 May | "Lean On" | Major Lazer and DJ Snake featuring MØ | Because Music | |
| 30 May | "Lean On" | Major Lazer and DJ Snake featuring MØ | Because Music | |
| 6 June | "Lean On" | Major Lazer and DJ Snake featuring MØ | Because Music | |
| 13 June | "Lean On" | Major Lazer and DJ Snake featuring MØ | Because Music | |
| 20 June | "Lean On" | Major Lazer and DJ Snake featuring MØ | Because Music | |
| 27 June | "Lean On" | Major Lazer and DJ Snake featuring MØ | Because Music | |
| 4 July | "Lean On" | Major Lazer and DJ Snake featuring MØ | Because Music | |
| 11 July | "Lean On" | Major Lazer and DJ Snake featuring MØ | Because Music | |
| 16 July | "Lean On" | Major Lazer and DJ Snake featuring MØ | Because Music | |
| 23 July | "Lean On" | Major Lazer and DJ Snake featuring MØ | Because Music | |
| 30 July | "Lean On" | Major Lazer and DJ Snake featuring MØ | Because Music | |
| 6 August | "Lean On" | Major Lazer and DJ Snake featuring MØ | Because Music | |
| 13 August | "Lean On" | Major Lazer and DJ Snake featuring MØ | Because Music | |
| 20 August | "Lean On" | Major Lazer and DJ Snake featuring MØ | Because Music | |
| 27 August | "Lean On" | Major Lazer and DJ Snake featuring MØ | Because Music | |
| 3 September | "Lean On" | Major Lazer and DJ Snake featuring MØ | Because Music | |
| 10 September | "Lean On" | Major Lazer and DJ Snake featuring MØ | Because Music | |
| 17 September ^{[a]} | "Easy Love" | Sigala | Ministry Of Sound | |
| 24 September | "Easy Love" | Sigala | Ministry Of Sound | |
| 1 October | "Easy Love" | Sigala | Ministry Of Sound | |
| 8 October | "Easy Love" | Sigala | Ministry Of Sound | |
| 15 October | "Easy Love" | Sigala | Ministry Of Sound | |
| 22 October | "Easy Love" | Sigala | Ministry Of Sound | |
| 29 October ^{[a]} | "Turn the Music Louder (Rumble)" | KDA featuring Tinie Tempah and Katy B | Ministry Of Sound | |
| 5 November ^{[a]} | "Hello" † | Adele | XL | |
| 12 November ^{[a]} | "Hello" † | Adele | XL | |
| 19 November ^{[a]} | "Hello" † | Adele | XL | |
| 26 November | "Hello" † | Adele | XL | |
| 3 December | "Hello" † | Adele | XL | |
| 10 December | "Sweet Lovin'" | Sigala featuring Bryn Christopher | Ministry Of Sound | |
| 17 December | "Hello" † | Adele | XL | |
| 24 December ^{[a]} | "A Bridge over You" | Lewisham and Greenwich NHS Choir | EmuBands | |

== Number-one Indie artists ==
| Position | Artist | Weeks at number one |
|---|---|---|
| 1 | Major Lazer | 21 |
| 2 | DJ Fresh | 8 |
| 3 | Adele | 7 |
| 3 | Sigala | 7 |
| 4 | Tchami | 4 |
| 5 | Ane Brun | 1 |
| 5 | Dr. Kucho! | 1 |
| 5 | Gregor Salto | 1 |
| 5 | KDA | 1 |
| 5 | Lewisham and Greenwich NHS Choir | 1 |
| 5 | Mike Mago | 1 |
| 5 | Wealdstone Raider | 1 |
| 5 | Wretch 32 | 1 |

== See also ==
- List of UK Dance Chart number-one singles of 2015
- List of UK R&B Chart number-one singles of 2015
- List of UK Rock Chart number-one singles of 2015
- List of UK Indie Chart number-one albums of 2015

== Notes ==
- ^{a} – The single was simultaneously number-one on the singles chart.
