= List of UK Dance Singles Chart number ones of 2015 =

The UK Dance Singles Chart is a weekly music chart compiled in the United Kingdom by the Official Charts Company (OCC) from sales of songs in the dance music genre (house, drum and bass, dubstep, etc.) in record stores and digital downloads. The dates listed in the menus below through 4 July 2015 represent the Saturday after the Sunday the chart was announced, as per the way the dates are given in chart publications such as the ones produced by Billboard, Guinness, and Virgin. As of 9 July 2015, the chart week runs from Friday to Thursday with the chart-date given as the following Thursday.

This is a list of the songs which were number one on the UK Dance Singles Chart during 2015.

== Chart history ==
Key
†	Best-selling dance single of the year

Chart date (week ending)	Song	Artist(s)	References
3 January	"Heroes (We Could Be)"	Alesso featuring Tove Lo	
10 January	"Wish You Were Mine"	Philip George	
17 January	"Wish You Were Mine"	Philip George	
24 January	"Wish You Were Mine"	Philip George	
31 January	"Wish You Were Mine"	Philip George	
7 February	"Wish You Were Mine"	Philip George	
14 February	"The Nights"	Avicii	
21 February	"Gravity"	DJ Fresh featuring Ella Eyre	
28 February	"Gravity"	DJ Fresh featuring Ella Eyre	
7 March	"What I Did for Love"	David Guetta featuring Emeli Sandé	
14 March	"What I Did for Love"	David Guetta featuring Emeli Sandé	
21 March	"What I Did for Love"	David Guetta featuring Emeli Sandé	
28 March	"So Freakin' Tight"	Tough Love	
4 April	"Higher"	Sigma featuring Labrinth	
11 April	"Firestone"	Kygo featuring Conrad Sewell	
18 April	"Firestone"	Kygo featuring Conrad Sewell	
25 April	"Can't Stop Playing (Makes Me High)"	Dr. Kucho! & Gregor Salto featuring Ane Brun (Oliver Heldens & Gregor Salto Remix)	
2 May	"Stronger"	Clean Bandit	
9 May	"Lean On" †	Major Lazer & DJ Snake featuring MØ	
16 May	"All Cried Out"	Blonde featuring Alex Newell	
23 May	"Runaway (U & I)"	Galantis	
30 May	"Where Are Ü Now"	Jack Ü & Justin Bieber	
6 June	"Where Are Ü Now"	Jack Ü & Justin Bieber	
13 June	"Lean On" †	Major Lazer & DJ Snake featuring MØ	
20 June	"Lean On" †	Major Lazer & DJ Snake featuring MØ	
27 June	"Lean On" †	Major Lazer & DJ Snake featuring MØ	
4 July	"Are You With Me"	Lost Frequencies	
9 July ^{[a]}	"Are You With Me"	Lost Frequencies	
16 July ^{[a]}	"House Every Weekend"	David Zowie	
23 July	"Are You With Me"	Lost Frequencies	
30 July	"Are You With Me"	Lost Frequencies	
6 August	"Are You With Me"	Lost Frequencies	
13 August	"How Deep Is Your Love"	Calvin Harris & Disciples featuring Ina Wroldsen	
20 August	"How Deep Is Your Love"	Calvin Harris & Disciples featuring Ina Wroldsen	
27 August	"How Deep Is Your Love"	Calvin Harris & Disciples featuring Ina Wroldsen	
3 September	"Ain't Nobody (Loves Me Better)"	Felix Jaehn featuring Jasmine Thompson	
10 September	"How Deep Is Your Love"	Calvin Harris & Disciples featuring Ina Wroldsen	
17 September ^{[a]}	"Easy Love"	Sigala	
24 September	"Easy Love"	Sigala	
1 October	"Easy Love"	Sigala	
8 October	"Easy Love"	Sigala	
15 October	"Alone No More"	Philip George & Anton Powers	
22 October	"Easy Love"	Sigala	
29 October ^{[a]}	"Turn the Music Louder (Rumble)"	KDA featuring Tinie Tempah & Katy B	
5 November	"Turn the Music Louder (Rumble)"	KDA featuring Tinie Tempah & Katy B	
12 November	"Never Forget You"	MNEK & Zara Larsson	
19 November	"Never Forget You"	MNEK & Zara Larsson	
26 November	"Never Forget You"	MNEK & Zara Larsson	
3 December	"Never Forget You"	MNEK & Zara Larsson	
10 December	"Never Forget You"	MNEK & Zara Larsson	
17 December	"Sweet Lovin'"	Sigala featuring Bryn Christopher	
24 December	"Sweet Lovin'"	Sigala featuring Bryn Christopher	
31 December	"Sweet Lovin'"	Sigala featuring Bryn Christopher	

- ^{a} – the single was simultaneously number-one on the singles chart.

== Number-one Dance artists ==
Position	Artist	Weeks at number one
1	Sigala	8
2	Philip George	6
3	Lost Frequencies	5
3	MNEK	5
4	Calvin Harris	4
4	Disciples	4
4	DJ Snake	4
4	Major Lazer	4
5	David Guetta	3
6	DJ Fresh	2
6	Jack Ü	2
6	KDA	2
6	Kygo	2
7	Anton Powers	1
7	Alesso	1
7	Avicii	1
7	Blonde	1
7	Clean Bandit	1
7	David Zowie	1
7	Dr. Kucho!	1
7	Felix Jaehn	1
7	Galantis	1
7	Gregor Salto	1
7	Oliver Heldens (As Remixer)	1
7	Sigma	1
7	Tough Love	1

== See also ==
- List of number-one singles of 2015 (UK)
- List of UK Dance Chart number-one albums of 2015
- List of UK Indie Chart number-one singles of 2015
- List of UK R&B Chart number-one singles of 2015
- List of UK Rock & Metal Singles Chart number ones of 2015
