= Noemí Carrión =

Spanish singer, dancer, and actress

- Also known as: Naymi; Noemí
- Born: Noemí Maria Carrión Pérez
- Origin: Alicante, Comunidad Valenciana, Spain
- Genres: Pop rock; electronica; dance; Latin; jazz
- Occupations: Singer; songwriter; actress
- Instruments: Vocals; keyboards; drums
- Years active: 1990s–present
- Labels: Sony Music; Weekend Records; Wondermark

Noemí Carrión Pérez, is a Spanish singer (soprano and mezzo-soprano), dancer, and actress, known also as Naymi and Noemí. Her work encompasses studio recording, songwriting, live performance, and television presenting.

== Biography ==
=== Background ===
Noemí Carrión, who originates from Alicante, Comunidad Valenciana, Spain, is a solo artist who has also been part of numerous groups including Nómadas and Nieva. She was a singer in the popular Spanish group La Década Prodigiosa and has also been a featured artiste with Mito and Sugar Reef. Carrión has sung with musicians from Seguirdad Social, UB40 and Revólver, and been a guest vocalist for recording artists such as Marc Antoine. She has worked with numerous members of the Spanish music industry, including award-winning record producer Antonio Escobar, Level Records (Madrid) producer David Ferrero (Mónica Naranjo, Chambao) and Universal Music producer Carlos Quintero (Chenoa, Beth), recording in many of the important recording studios of Madrid.

musical career at 16 in Alicante, by winning various musical contests in Spanish cities, recording for advertising jingles, adding her voice to the songs of other artists and acting in shows. At 21, she settled in Madrid to study music, composition, voice, guitar, percussion, violin, modern dance, dramatic art, music history and music interpretation, for theater, movies and television. As well as 3 years of study at La Strada and El Almadén stage & drama schools, she took courses in Hip Hop, Latin American, Jazz and Street dance styles, in interpretive charisma, in dubbing (with the prestigious José Padilla, and in acting interpretation with actress & casting director Rosa Estévez. In 1997, she independently released Fruta Prohibida, followed in 1998, by Pachá Alicante.

=== Commercial success ===
Carrión participated in the Televisión Española festival show Eurocanción, aired on TVE1, as Noemí, becoming a finalist in the Spanish Eurovision Contest. In the competition, she scored 63 points, with her song "Sin Rencor", reaching 4th position, above Merche (6th), Sonia & Selena (9th) and Natalia (11th). She has also sung at important festivals in Spain including The DJ Awards, Festival Freedom (Torremolinos) and El Mediatic in Alicante.

In 2002, her dance-pop track, the funky house anthem "Friday Night Forever" (Sony Music Entertainment), written by Swedish songwriters, Peder Ernerot & Gustav Lund, and recorded under the alias Naymi, hit the charts of Máxima FM and was well received in the clubs and on the radio. Distributed in Spain, Portugal, Italy, US, UK and Russia, DJ Magazine (UK) gave the record, which was recorded in English and in Spanish, top star ratings in September 2002. The Club mixes were produced by the most famous DJs and house producers in Spain – David Ferrero, Pedro Del Moral, Dr Kucho! and Wally López, who according to the same DJ Magazine article, were "the entire Spanish 'A' list" and dominated the Spanish club scene throughout the 2000s. After Naymi's release of "Friday Night Forever", the song was covered by Belgian artist, Sonny O'Brien, in 2003.

=== Solo album ===
In 2002-3, Naymi recorded her debut album for Sony Music, produced by David Ferrero, Pedro Del Moral and Wally López, with vocals produced by Dr Kucho! and Antonio Escobar, which, due to changes within Sony Europe, was not released. The album featured songs written by Carrión including Pensado En Tí and Por Tí, as well as Alma Rota, written by Escobar, and another Ernerot & Lund song, "Superwoman", sung in English and in Spanish, which was later covered by O'Brien, in 2005.

=== Theater appearances ===
Carrión has starred in various musicals including Pippi Calzaslargas in 2000 at the Teatro Real de Madrid, and We Will Rock You (a show inspired by rock group Queen) at the Teatro Calderón (Madrid), in 2003 and 2004, where she was personally selected by Brian May to interpret Meat Loaf, a co-starring role in the musical, where she made a solo interpretation of the Brian May ballad "No One But You", receiving excellent artistic criticism from the Spanish press. She then appeared on the Spanish theatrical soundtrack double CD and special edition CD of the musical.

=== Television and movie work ===
Carrión has performed voice-overs and music for advertising commercials including Santander Central Hispano (Alphaville's "Forever Young"), Caser Seguros, Canal Isabel II, IKEA, Orange, Jazztel and Viva La Resistencia, a multi-channel campaign against cervical cancer commissioned by Asociación Nacional para el desarrollo de la Salud en la Mujer, all of which aired on Spanish networks. She has also appeared on television, performing theme tunes and cover songs as a soloist, as a member of a group, and as a chorus girl for other artists. She has been the principal singer with the orchestra for the television series A La Carta, presented by Agustín Bravo, broadcast on Antena 3 throughout 2004, and has also acted in film shoots for publicity films, promotional films and short films.

=== Guest appearances ===
In 2005, she appeared in Gente de Primera, a Spanish reality TV programme on Televisión Española alongside guests Marta Sanchez, David Civera and Pastora Soler. She has also recorded with French smooth jazz guitarist Marc Antoine on his 2005 album Modern Times (Rendezvous Entertainment), appearing on Camden Town, Samba Hood, and Cantar Al Amor. Carrión was a soprano soloist on the 2005 Mexican tour of Spanish singer, Raphael , and has recorded with Pablo Moro (Carlito Records, Spain). In 2005, she appeared as a guest performer on Vuelvo, the pop single of Spanish singer, Yurena, alongside Eva Cortés and Marian Rebolleda. Also in 2005, she performed as a vocalist in the children's television series El Mundo Mágico De Brunelesky (Telecinco), directed by Javier Espiniella, appearing on the CD recording of the show.

=== Pop development ===
In 2006, Naymi's spectacular pop-dance rendition of ABBA's "Gimme! Gimme! Gimme!" (Blanco Y Negro, Spain, and Mas Label, Mexico), sung in English and also produced by David Ferrero, was released with group Mito, and like "Friday Night Forever", was well-received on the radio airwaves. Later in 2006, Carrión appeared as a main character in the series L'Alqueria Blanca (Canal 9, Valencia), for production company, Zenit TV. She also starred as a solo singer in the 2006 musical spectacle On Broadway, directed by Victor Fernandez, at the 3D Scenica in Madrid, for production company Stage Entertaimet España.

=== Stage development ===
In 2006 and 2007, Carrión performed with La Gran Orquesta Santiago in Madrid singing Joan Manuel Serrat's "Hoy Puede Ser Un Gran Día", and in 2007, at the renowned Circo Price theatre (Madrid), in the musical spectacle Charivari directed by Rob Tannion. At this time, she also taught popular music composition at the Marand School of Music and Dance, Madrid.

=== Rock launch ===
In 2004, Carrión formed the Spanish pop-rock group Nieva (meaning Snows), whose musical sound fuses electric guitars with electronica. After 3 years of development, in 2007, the duo performed concerts in Spanish cities with a full band, before writing, recording and producing their debut album. In 2011, the group began the final mixing and mastering of Sed De Mar (Sea of Thirst).

=== Later activities ===
In 2009, Carrión performed at the Reina Victoria theatre in Madrid as a singer in the cast of the musical spectacle Historia Del Pop Español: 50 años de antología del pop en España, directed by Héctor Oliveira, starring on the show tour. Carrión later performed at the 26th Jazz Festival of Madrid in November 2009. Also in 2009, French techno DJ, Ovejito Lindo, produced a bootleg mashup "Moi Lolita versus Gimme", as Alizée vs Mito & Naymi with British music magazine NME featuring the production in the NME awards 2009 section of their website.

In 2010, Italian label, Wondermark, released the pop-samba track "Rio de Janeiro" by group Sugar Reef, featuring Naymi, which was sung in Spanish and distributed digital stores in over 40 countries. The song was co-written, arranged, produced and mixed by veteran music producer Tom East (Fobian, Charlotte Roel, DJ Alligator, James Sampson, Eden, Nouveau Sisters). With vocals engineered by David Ferrero, the production was based on the 1999 hit "Rio" by Danish pop group Bluebeat (Virgin Records), also produced by East, which had reached number 4 in the MTV Europe video hit list.

== Recordings ==
=== Solo ===
- 1997 Noemí Carrión Fruta Prohibida (Independent, España) CD single
- 1998 Noemí Carrión Pachá Alicante (Independent, España) CD single
- 2002 Naymi Friday Night Forever (Sony Music Entertainment, SAMPCM 11797 2), CD single [English Album Version, Spanish Album Version, Vocal Weekend Remix (David Ferrero, Pedro Del Moral), Club Vocal Remix (Dr. Kucho)]
- 2002 Naymi Friday Night Forever – Weekend Remixes (Sony Music Media/Weekend Records, SMM 672931 6), 12" vinyl [Club Vocal Mix (Dr. Kucho), Super Weekend Mix (Wally López), Vocal Weekend Mix (David Ferrero, Pedro Del Moral), Instrumental Weekend Mix (David Ferrero, Pedro Del Moral)]
- 2003 Naymi (self-titled) (Sony Music Media, S.A., España, unreleased), CD album [Friday Night Forever (Spanglish Version), Superwoman (Spanish Version), Pensado En Tí (Thinking About You), Siente La Vida (Feeling For Real), Ojalá Tuviera Fe (I Wish I Had Faith), Abre El Corazón (Open Your Heart), Por Tí (For You), Alma Rota (Broken Soul), You're My Destiny, Déjame Respirar (Let Me Breathe), Friday Night Forever (English Version), Superwoman (English Version)]

=== Featured artist ===
- 2004 Original Cast Recording Queen: We Will Rock You (Español) (EMI Music, España, 784270), CD double album
- 2004 Original Cast Recording Queen: We Will Rock You (Español) (EMI Music, España), CD double album [includes special bonus CD featuring Short, Long and Multimedia versions of No One But You and Multimedia version of Bohemian Rhapsody (with images from the musical)]
- 2005 Various Artists El Mundo Mágico De Brunelesky (Telecinco, España), CD album
- 2006 Mito featuring Naymi Gimme Gimme Gimme (Blanco y Negro, España, MXCD 1625 (CS) CTV)), on Pasion Por El Dance, CD album + DVD album
- 2009 Sugar Reef featuring Naymi Rio de Janeiro (Wondermark, Italy), Digital Download [Radio Mix, Beach Party Mix]

=== Guest artist ===
- 2005 Yurena, Vuelvo (Trak Música, España), CD single
- 2006 Marc Antoine Modern Times (Rendezvous Entertainment, US, B000A2H9Z2), CD album

=== Video ===
- 2007 Noemí Carrión with La Gran Orquesta Santiago Hoy Puede Ser Un Gran Dia (live)
- 2009 Alizée vs Mito & Naymi (DJ Oveijto Lindo) Moi Lolita versus Gimme, NME Awards Official Website
- 2002 Nieva, Directo en el Paraninfo Universidad de Alicante (live, 29 November 2002)
- 2002 Nómadas Nadie Es Como Tu

== Shows ==
=== Theatre ===
- 2000 Pippi Calzaslargas, Teatro Real de Madrid
- 2003-4 Queen: We Will Rock You, Teatro Calderón, Madrid
- 2006 On Broadway, 3D Scenica, Madrid
- 2006–07 La Gran Orquesta Santiago, Madrid
- 2007 Charivari, Circo Price, Madrid
- 2009 Historia Del Pop Español, Reina Victoria, Madrid
- 2009 26th Jazz Festival of Madrid

=== Television ===
- 2001 Eurocanción (TVE1)
- 2004 A La Carta (Antena 3)
- 2005 Gente de Primera (Televisión Española)
- 2005 El Mundo Mágico De Brunelesky (Telecinco)
- 2006 L´Alqueria Blanca (Canal 9, Valencia)
