= List of UK Independent Albums Chart number ones of 2015 =

These are the Official Charts Company's UK Indie Chart number-one albums of 2015.

== Chart history ==
Key
†	Best-selling indie album of the year

Issue date	Album	Artist(s)	Record label	Ref.
5 January	AM	Arctic Monkeys	Domino	
12 January	Lost in the Dream	The War on Drugs	Secretly Canadian	
19 January	Lost in the Dream	The War on Drugs	Secretly Canadian	
26 January	The Mindsweep	Enter Shikari	Ambush Reality	
1 February	Modern Nature	The Charlatans	Cooking Vinyl	
8 February	Modern Nature	The Charlatans	Cooking Vinyl	
15 February	Written in Scars	Jack Savoretti	Chrysalis Group	
22 February	Texas 25	Texas	Pias	
1 March	The Race for Space	Public Service Broadcasting	Test Card	
8 March	Chasing Yesterday	Noel Gallagher's High Flying Birds	Sour Mash	
15 March	Chasing Yesterday	Noel Gallagher's High Flying Birds	Sour Mash	
22 March	Chasing Yesterday	Noel Gallagher's High Flying Birds	Sour Mash	
29 March	Chasing Yesterday	Noel Gallagher's High Flying Birds	Sour Mash	
5 April	The Day Is My Enemy	The Prodigy	Cooking Vinyl	
12 April	Future Hearts	All Time Low	Hopeless	
19 April	The Day Is My Enemy	The Prodigy	Cooking Vinyl	
26 April	Sound & Color	Alabama Shakes	Rough Trade	
3 May	Chasing Yesterday	Noel Gallagher's High Flying Birds	Sour Mash	
10 May	Integrity>	Jme	Boy Better Know	
17 May	Chasing Yesterday	Noel Gallagher's High Flying Birds	Sour Mash	
24 May	Sol Invictus	Faith No More	Reclamation Records/Ipecac	
31 May	Chasing Yesterday	Noel Gallagher's High Flying Birds	Sour Mash	
7 June	In Colour	Jamie xx	Young Turks	
14 June	Alternative Light Source	Leftfield	Infectious Records	
21 June	Chasing Yesterday	Noel Gallagher's High Flying Birds	Sour Mash	
28 June	My Love Is Cool	Wolf Alice	Dirty Hit	
5 July	Still	Richard Thompson	Proper Records	
10 July	Written in Scars	Jack Savoretti	Chrysalis Group	
17 July	Written in Scars	Jack Savoretti	Chrysalis Group	
24 July	Something More Than Free	Jason Isbell	Southeastern	
31 July	VII: Sturm und Drang	Lamb of God	Nuclear Blast	
7 August	Water for Your Soul	Joss Stone	Stone'd Records	
14 August	Written in Scars	Jack Savoretti	Chrysalis Group	
21 August	Life's Not out to Get You	Neck Deep	Hopeless	
28 August	143	Bars and Melody	143	
4 September	Bad Magic	Motörhead	UDR	
11 September	Got Your Six	Five Finger Death Punch	Eleven Seven	
18 September	Keep the Village Alive	Stereophonics	Stylus	
25 September	Keep the Village Alive	Stereophonics	Stylus	
2 October	Music Complete	New Order	Mute	
9 October	In Dream	Editors	Pias	
16 October	Grey Tickles, Black Pressure	John Grant	Bella Union	
23 October	Behind the Devil's Back	Fightstar	Fightstar	
30 October	The Hank Williams Songbook	Daniel O'Donnell	DMG TV	
6 November	Always: The Very Best of Erasure	Erasure	BMG	
13 November	Always: The Very Best of Erasure	Erasure	BMG	
20 November	Nightbird	Eva Cassidy	Blix Street	
27 November	25 †	Adele	XL	
4 December	25 †	Adele	XL	
11 December	25 †	Adele	XL	
18 December	25 †	Adele	XL	
25 December	25 †	Adele	XL	

== See also ==
- List of UK Dance Albums Chart number ones of 2015
- List of UK Album Downloads Chart number ones of the 2010s
- List of UK Independent Singles Chart number ones of 2015
- List of UK R&B Albums Chart number ones of 2015
- List of UK Independent Singles Chart number ones of 2015
