= Nieva (band) =

Spanish pop rock group

- Origin: Madrid, Spain
- Genres: Pop rock, electronica, electropop, gothic rock
- Years active: 2004-present
- Label: Antipop
- Members: Antonio Escobar; Noemí Carrión

Nieva (meaning Snows), is a Spanish pop rock group formed in the 2000s by Noemí Carrión (singer), and Antonio Escobar (producer). whose musical sound fuses electric guitars with electronica.

== Biography ==
Antonio Escobar and Noemí Carrión met during 2002, in the Madrid recording studio of Spanish House DJ and record producer Dr Kucho!, where they were recording vocals for Carrión's solo album for Sony Music. In 2004, they formed Nieva and in 2007, after 3 years of development, the duo performed concerts, in Spanish cities with a full band, before writing, recording and producing their debut album. In 2011, the group began the final mixing and mastering of Sed De Mar (Sea Of Thirst) which featured the songs De Cualquier Manera, Maldito Veneno, Rompecorazones and Sólo Me Importas Tú.

== Discography ==
- Nieva De Cualquier Manera, Maldito Veneno, Rompecorazones, Sólo Me Importas Tú (Antipop, España), EP
- Nieva Sed De Mar (Antipop, España), album

== See also ==
- Spanish rock
- Rock en Español
