= List of UK Dance Albums Chart number ones of 2015 =

These are the Official Charts Company's UK Dance Albums Chart number ones of 2015. The dates listed in the menus below through 4 July 2015 represent the Saturday after the Sunday the chart was announced, as per the way the dates are given in chart publications such as the ones produced by Billboard, Guinness, and Virgin. As of 9 July 2015, the chart week runs from Friday to Thursday with the chart-date given as the following Thursday.

== Chart history ==
| Issue date | Album | Artist(s) | Record label | Ref. |
|---|---|---|---|---|
| 3 January | Motion | Calvin Harris | Deconstruction | |
| 10 January | Motion | Calvin Harris | Deconstruction | |
| 17 January | Pure Deep House 3 | Various Artists | New State | |
| 24 January | The Weekender | Various Artists | Ministry of Sound | |
| 31 January | The Weekender | Various Artists | Ministry of Sound | |
| 7 February | The Weekender | Various Artists | Ministry of Sound | |
| 14 February | V.I.P | Various Artists | Ministry of Sound | |
| 21 February | V.I.P | Various Artists | Ministry of Sound | |
| 28 February | V.I.P | Various Artists | Ministry of Sound | |
| 7 March | BBC Radio 1's Dance Anthems 2015 | Various Artists | Ministry of Sound | |
| 14 March | BBC Radio 1's Dance Anthems 2015 | Various Artists | Ministry of Sound | |
| 21 March | Fitness Beats 2015 | Various Artists | Rhino | |
| 28 March | BBC Radio 1's Dance Anthems 2015 | Various Artists | Ministry of Sound | |
| 4 April | All Gone Pete Tong & Gorgon City: Miami 2015 | Various Artists | Defected Records | |
| 11 April | The Day Is My Enemy | The Prodigy | Cooking Vinyl/Take Me to the Hospital | |
| 18 April | Throw Back Old Skool Anthems | Various Artists | Ministry of Sound | |
| 25 April | I Love House | Various Artists | Ministry of Sound | |
| 2 May | I Love House | Various Artists | Ministry of Sound | |
| 9 May | I Love House | Various Artists | Ministry of Sound | |
| 16 May | I Love House | Various Artists | Ministry of Sound | |
| 23 May | I Love House | Various Artists | Ministry of Sound | |
| 30 May | I Love House | Various Artists | Ministry of Sound | |
| 6 June | The Fatboy Slim Collection | Various Artists | Sony Music TV | |
| 13 June | In Colour | Jamie xx | Young Turks | |
| 20 June | The Fatboy Slim Collection | Various Artists | Sony Music TV | |
| 27 June | Drive | Various Artists | Ministry of Sound | |
| 4 July | No Limits | Various Artists | U.M.T.V. | |
| 9 July | Ibiza Decades | Various Artists | U.M.T.V. | |
| 16 July | Ibiza Decades | Various Artists | U.M.T.V. | |
| 23 July | Communion | Years & Years | Polydor | |
| 30 July | Communion | Years & Years | Polydor | |
| 6 August | Born in the Echoes | The Chemical Brothers | Virgin EMI | |
| 13 August | BBC Radio 1's Dance Anthems Ibiza 20 Years | Various Artists | Ministry of Sound | |
| 20 August | Clubland 27 | Various Artists | U.M.T.V. | |
| 27 August | Clubland 27 | Various Artists | U.M.T.V. | |
| 3 September | Sunset Soul | Various Artists | Ministry of Sound | |
| 10 September | Sunset Soul | Various Artists | Ministry of Sound | |
| 17 September | I Am a Raver | Various Artists | Ministry of Sound | |
| 24 September | VIP – Vol. 2 | Various Artists | Ministry of Sound | |
| 1 October | Ministry of Sound Presents: The Running Bug 3 | Various Artists | Ministry of Sound | |
| 8 October | Caracal | Disclosure | PMR | |
| 15 October | We the Generation | Rudimental | Atlantic | |
| 22 October | Faithless 2.0 | Faithless | Sony | |
| 29 October | Electronica 1: The Time Machine | Jean Michel Jarre | Columbia | |
| 5 November | EDM 2015 | Various Artists | Sony Music | |
| 12 November | This Is Dance 2016 | Various Artists | UMTV | |
| 19 November | The Annual 2016 | Various Artists | Ministry of Sound | |
| 26 November | The Annual 2016 | Various Artists | Ministry of Sound | |
| 3 December | I Love Garage | Various Artists | Ministry of Sound | |
| 10 December | The Annual 2016 | Various Artists | Ministry of Sound | |
| 17 December | The Annual 2016 | Various Artists | Ministry of Sound | |
| 24 December | The Annual 2016 | Various Artists | Ministry of Sound | |
| 31 December | The Annual 2016 | Various Artists | Ministry of Sound | |

== See also ==
- List of UK Albums Chart number ones of the 2010s
- List of UK Dance Singles Chart number ones of 2015
- List of UK Album Downloads Chart number ones of the 2010s
- List of UK Independent Singles Chart number ones of 2015
- List of UK R&B Albums Chart number ones of 2015
- List of UK Independent Singles Chart number ones of 2015
- List of UK Compilation Chart number ones of the 2010s
