= Antonio Escobar Núñez =

Spanish musical artist (born 1976)

Antonio Escobar
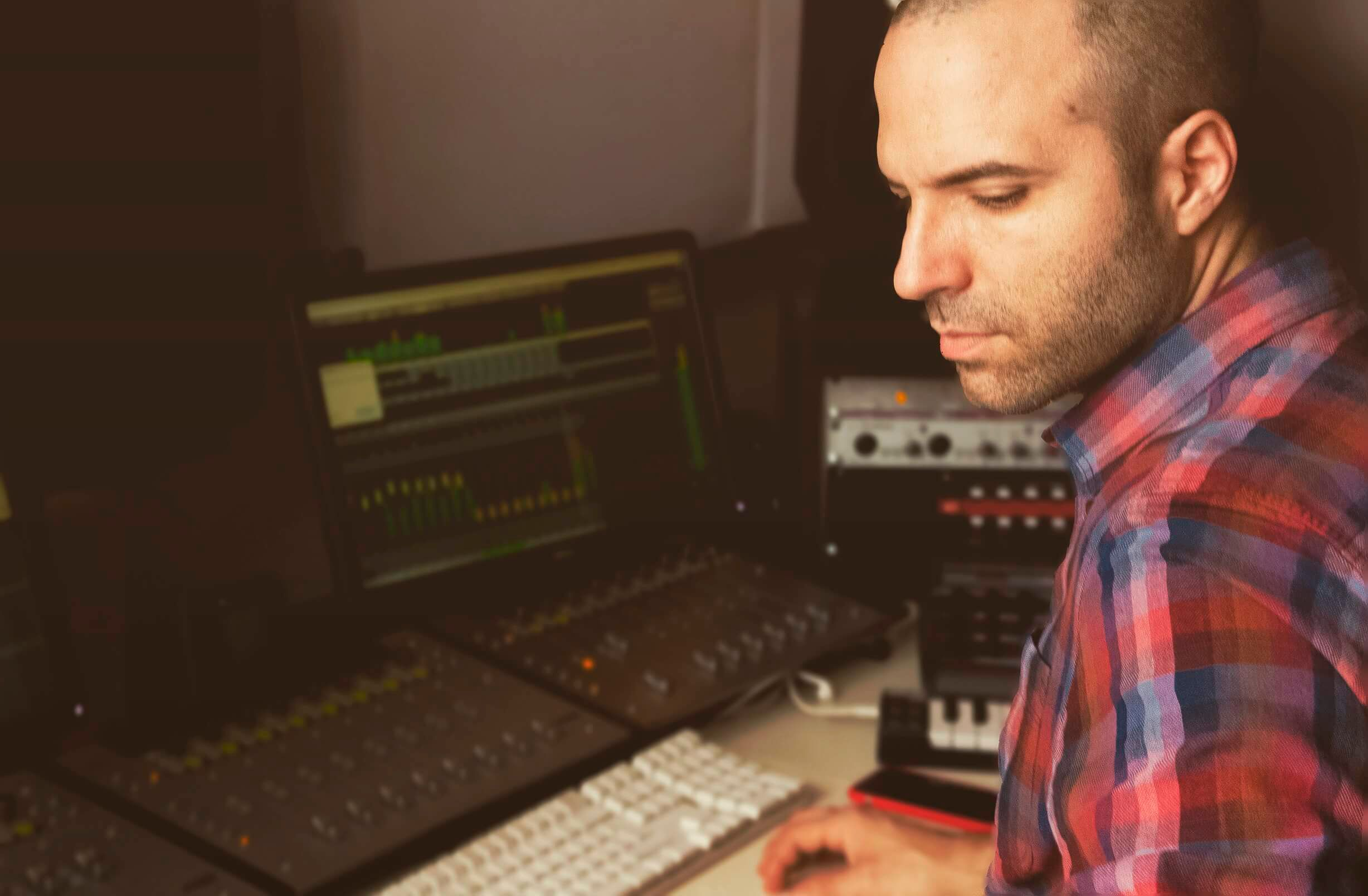
- Escobar working at the studio, 2017

Background information
- Also known as: Antonio Escobar, Alan May
- Born: Antonio Escobar Núñez; 1976 (age 49–50); Pamplona, Spain
- Origin: Spain
- Genres: Rock, electronica, pop, dance, Latin, orchestral
- Occupations: Music producer, sound designer, composer, mixing engineer, songwriter
- Instrument: keyboards
- Years active: 1990s-present
- Website: www.antonioescobar.es

Antonio Escobar Núñez (born 1976) is a Spanish musical artist who has won awards during his career as a music producer, mixing engineer, sound designer and composer for advertising, film, TV and recording artists. Escobar's music features rock, electronica, pop, dance, urban, Latin and orchestral influences.

== Biography ==
=== Background ===
Antonio Escobar was born in Pamplona, Navarre, Spain, raised in Málaga and is of Andalusian descent. He began during the late 1990s as a studio engineer and music producer for the Spanish singer Manzanita and in 1998, formed Spanish the award-winning indie band Maydrïm.

=== Productions ===
Escobar was one of the first music producers in Spain to merge rock, electronica, pop and orchestral in the late 1990s and he has been very connected with the last trends in music.

He has worked composing, arranging and producing for a series of recording artists and music groups including John Legend's A Place Called World, Zara Larsson's Invisible (Klaus movie version), Dan Croll, Carlos Rivera, Malú, Dvicio, Nena Daconte, Manzanita, Vanesa Martín, Carlos Baute, OBK, Anni B Seet, Carles Benavent, Carlos Tarque (M-Clan), Dani Reus & The Gospel Factory, De Pedro, Dr Kucho!, Garrett Wall, José Ortega, La Mari (Chambao), Salvador Beltrán, Lolita Flores, Lonely Joe (as "Alan May"), Lucas, Luis Ramiro, Marwan, Vanexxa and Zahara. He has worked with many important music companies including Columbia, EMI, Sony Music, Universal Music, Warner Music, Vale Music, Subterfuge, El Diablo, Lunar and Weekend.

=== Sonic branding ===
In 2000, Escobar was a mixing engineer and technician for live programmes at Localia Málaga, Málaga, a former television channel of the Prisa Media Group. In 2002, he moved to Madrid to become chief producer, composer and mixer for the advertising division of A.S.K., a music production company owned by the Argentinian rock producer Alejandro Stivel and one of Spain’s top 5 music production studios at that time. Escobar established the production company and record label, Antipop, to maximize his music productivity within the advertising industry, generate soundtracks for film and television, and produce music for more recording artists.

=== Advertising campaigns ===
Escobar has composed and produced music for television, cinema and commercials, including idents, and has worked on over 200 publicity campaigns on behalf of advertising agencies and media channels for Europe and USA. He has created music for the promotion of Spanish brands, including Adif, Aena, Sammontana and Caja Madrid, and has recorded with the Bratislava Symphony Orchestra and the La Orquesta de Cámara Andrés Segovia.

Escobar has also created advertising scores for international brands, including Audi, B.M.W., Carlsberg, Carrefour (broadcast in 34 countries), Coca-Cola, Ford, Nestlé, Orange, Pepsi, Peugeot, Procter & Gamble, Renault, Santander, Sony PlayStation, Telefónica, Turismo España and Visa (worldwide campaign). The commercials have been broadcast in Spain (Iberia (on Antena 3), Canal Plus, Telecinco, Televisión Española, Corporación Radiotelevisión Española, Cuatro and laSexta), as well as internationally (Europe, Asia and South America).

=== Awards ===
In recognition of his music-to-picture talents, Escobar has won various industry awards for his contributions to the sonic and visual arts. These include a Oscars Academy Awards and Cannes Film Festival nominations, BAFTA, Gold award for Best Music at the New York Film Festival, Goya Awards, Las Vegas International Film Awards, to name a few.

=== Rock launch ===
In 2003, Escobar joined forces with the singer Noemí Carrión to form the pop-rock group Nómadas and in 2004, Nieva meaning Snows, whose musical sound fuses electric guitars with electronica. In 2007, after three years of development, the duo performed concerts in Spanish cities with a full band before writing, recording and producing their debut album. In 2011, the group began the final mixing and mastering of Sed De Mar (Sea Of Thirst). Also in 2011, Escobar was the programmer of Hacia Lo Salvaje, the sixth studio album of award-winning Spanish rock group Amaral.

=== Later activities ===
Escobar's latest soundtracks credits include Klaus, Reyes de la Noche, El Cid, Santiago Of The Seas, Alex´s Strip. He has also participated in singles for the band Dvicio ( "Soy de volar")

== Awards, prizes, nominations (outdated) ==
=== Film and TV - individual (outdated) ===
- 2009 Best Soundtrack, “Miente”, III Festival Digital El Sector, Spain
- 2008 Best Soundtrack (Roel Mejor Música), “Miente”, 21st Medina del Campo Festival, Spain
- 2008 Best Soundtrack, “Miente”, III Corto Festival “Dunas” de Cine y Video, Spain
- 2006 Silver, R.T.V.E. “Comunícate”, New York Film Festival, US
- 2005 Best Music, “Buenos Compañeros”, X Festival U.E.M. Cortometrajes, Spain

=== Music - individual (outdated) ===
- 2007 Best Song, Maydrïm “Lighthouse”, II Electronic Music Contest Caja España, Spain
- 2003 Best Trip Hop Theme, Maydrïm "Inside", Hispasonic, Spain
- 2001 Best Song, Maydrïm “Drink My Eyes”, International Shock Millennium, Spain
- 2000 Best Band, Maydrïm, Muestra de Música Joven Ciudad de Málaga, Spain

=== Advertising - individual (outdated) ===
- 2004 Mejor Música (Silver), Carlsberg "Kulu Ngile", Premios Drac, Spain
- 2004 Best Sound, Coca-Cola “Musical”, Premios A.P.P.E. (Asociación de Productoras Publicitarias Españolas), Spain
- 2003 Best Music (Gold), Coca-Cola “Musical”, New York Film Festival, US

=== Film & TV - collective (outdated) ===
- 2020 Nomination Best Animation Film, Klaus (film), The Oscars Awards, US
- 2020 Best Animation Film, Klaus (film), BAFTA Awards, UK
- 2009 Best Short Film, “Miente”, III Festival Digital El Sector, Spain
- 2009 Best Script, “Impávido”, I Concurso Nacional de Proyectos Cinematográficos "Ciudad de Gijón", Spain
- 2009 Best Short Film, “Miente”, Awarded by Academia de las Artes Cinematográficas de España, XXIII Premios Goya (Mejor Cortometraje), Spain
- 2008 Best Short Film, “Miente”, III Corto Festival “Dunas” de Cine y Video, Spain
- 2008 Premio Al Mejor Cortometraje Temática De Igualdad, "Miente", VI Certamen de cortometrajes de Écija Thánatos, Spain
- 2008 Best Short Film (Roel de Oro) and Best Director (Roel), “Miente”, 21st Medina del Campo Festival, Spain
- 2008 Biznaga De Plata, “Miente”, 11º Festival de Málaga, Spain
- 2007 Best Short Film, “Impávido”, Fant-cortada, Spain
- 2007 Best Short Film, “Impávido”, Festival de cortometrajes Cortogenia, Spain
- 2005 Best Music, “Buenos Compañeros”, Universidad Europe de Madrid, Spain

=== Advertising – collective (outdated) ===
- 2006 Gold, Metro de Madrid “Transparente”, New York Film Festival, US
- 2005 Sol De Plata, Metro de Madrid “Transparente”, El Sol 2005 (San Sebastián), Spain
- 2005 Sol De Bronce, Cowboy “Dodot Etapas”, El Sol 2005 (San Sebastián), Spain
- 2005 Best Advert, Coca-Cola “Del Pita”, Premios “El Chupete”, Spain
- 2005 Best Integrated Marketing Program, Coca-Cola “Del Pita”, Marketing Excellence Awards (TCCC), UK
- 2005 Gold, Coca-Cola “Del Pita”, “Premios A.M.P.E. 2005, Spain
- 2005 Bronze, Coca-Cola “Del Pita”, New York Film Festival, US
- 2004 Gold, Coca-Cola “Del Pita”, Premios A.P.P.E. (Asociación de Productoras Publicitarias Españolas), Spain
- 2004 Finalist, Coca-Cola “Musical”, Premios El Sol B, Spain
- 2004 Finalist, Coca-Cola “Musical”, Cannes Lions, France
- 2004 Finalist, Coca-Cola “Musical”, London International Awards, UK
- 2003 Finalist, Coca-Cola “Musical”, Premios Zapping, Spain
- 2003 Best Advert, Coca-Cola “Musical”, TP de Oro, Spain

== Advertising music ==
=== International brands ===
Audi, Banco Bilbao Vizcaya Argentaria, B.M.W., Bongrain SA, Carlsberg, Carrefour, Coca-Cola, Ford, Girlguiding UK, I.B.M., IKEA, Illva Saronno, Movistar, Nestlé, Orange, Pepsi, Peugeot, Procter & Gamble, Renault, Sammontana, Santander, Sony PlayStation, Ssang Yong, Sunny Delight, Telefónica, Turismo España, Turismo Madrid, Visa

=== Spanish brands ===
Asociación Nacional para el desarrollo de la Salud en la Mujer, Adif, Aena, Amena, Antena Tres, Aviva, Barceló, Caballero, Caja Madrid, Canal Plus, Castilla La Mancha, Cerveza Mixta, Comité Olímpico Español, Comunidad de Madrid, Cuatro, El Corte Inglés, Endesa, Ferrovial, Flex, Fuerzas Armadas de España, Fundación Irene Megías, Hipotecas.Com, Jazztel, Kalise, Larios laSexta, Metro Madrid, Ministerio de Trabajo e Inmigración de España, MultiÓpticas, Once, Mútua Madrileña, Orlando, Páginas Amarillas, Real Club Celta de Vigo, RTVE, Santa Lucía, Telecinco, Televisión Española, Tesoro Público

== Film music ==
IMDB

- 2021 El rey de todo el mundo
- 2021 Reyes de la noche
- 2020 El Cid
- 2020 Santiago Of The Seas
- 2020 Relatos con-fi-na-dos
- 2020 La cinta de Alex
- 2019 Klaus
- 2019 Qué te juegas
- 2019 Qin ai de xin nian hao
- 2019 ¿Qué te juegas?
- 2019 #Abro Hilo
- 2018 La teoría del sueño
- 2018 El árbol de la sangre
- 2018 Perdida
- 2018 "Serás hombre", Director: Isabel de Ocampo
- 2018 Black Panther
- 2018 No dormirás
- 2017 Talismán
- 2017 Sólo se vive una vez
- 2017 "Toc Toc", Director: Vicente Villanueva, Lazona
- 2016 Mascotas
- 2016 Money
- 2015 All Roads Lead To Rome
- 2014 Gurba
- 2014 O21
- 2013 Al otro lado de la puerta
- 2013 Jaisalmer
- 2012 Atocha 70
- 2012 "Evelyn", Director: Isabel de Ocampo, La Voz Que Yo Amo
- 2012 “Looking For Eimish” (Buscando an Eimish), Director: Ana Rodriguez, Jana Films.
- 2012 “Impávido”, Director: Carlos Therón, Enigma Films.
- 2012 Sssh!
- 2011 La raya que me raya
- 2011 "Háztelo Mirar", TV series, Directors: Víctor Martín León & David Velduque, Antena 3 Neox.
- 2010 “The Vampire In The Hole”, Director: Sonia Escolano & Sadrac González, LaSoga/Lukantum.
- 2006 “La Máquina De Bailar”, Director: Óscar de Aibar, Amiguetes Entertainment/Ensueño Films/Chapuzas Audiovisuales.
- 2010 "The Recipient", Director: Javier Bermúdez, Fanatico Films.
- 2010 "Desalmados", TV series (online), Director: Víctor Martín León, Antena 3.
- 2009 "18RDC (Ritmo De la Calle)", Videomedia, TV series, Executive Producers: Cristina Castilla & Eva Sánchez, Antena 3.
- 2009 “Terapia”, Director: Nuria Verde (Premios Goya Award Nominee for Best Fictional Short Film 2010).
- 2009 "Sea Bed", Director: Laura M. Campos, Antipop Films.
- 2008 “Madrid 2016”, Comunidad de Madrid.
- 2008 “¡Al Cielo Con Ella!”, Director: Nicolás Pacheco, La Tapia Producciones/Secuencia Imagen y Comunicación.
- 2008 “Estrella”, Director: Belén Herrera de la Osa.
- 2008 “Miente”, Produccíones Líquídas, Director: Isabel de Ocampo, Mandil.
- 2007 “Impávido”, Mandríl, Starring Marta Torné, Director: Carlos Therón, Producciones Líquidas.
- 2007 "Never Ending", Director: Laura M. Campos, Antipop Films.
- 2005 "Good Partners" (Buenos compañeros), Director: Miguel de Priego.
- 2005 “Mrs Eriksson In Spain" (La señora Eriksson en España) (Audio Mixing), Director: Carita Boronska, Tonetailor Productions.

== Recordings (outdated) ==
=== Albums ===
- 2011 Nieva "Sed Del Mar" (pending)
- 2010 Niño Raro “Treinta y Tres”
- 2009 Maydrïm “Makeyourselfagain”
- 2009 Lucas "Palo Al Agua" (EMI España)
- 2008 Lonely Joe “Un Toque De Lonely” (Subterfuge Records)
- 2006 Vanexxa “Se Rompe O Se Raja” (Subterfuge Records)
- 2005 Lonely Joe “Songs From The Low Side” (Subterfuge Records)
- 2004 Gladston Galliza “Tocca Essa Bola” (Carlsberg)
- 2003 Lonely Joe “Dark Ghost Of Shame” (Junk Records)
- 2001 Maydrïm "#Interactive"
- 2001 José Ortega "La Rosa De Tu Piel"

=== Singles ===
- 2011 Maydrïm featuring Sara Montgomery-Campbell "Never Ending" (pending)
- 2010 Maydrïm featuring Sara Montgomery-Campbell "Something" (Pop Up Música)
- 2008 Lucas "Éste Corazón" (EMI España)
- 2006 Cycle "Mechanical"
- 2005 Mar "A Que No Me Callo" (EMI España)
- 2005 Maydrïm featuring Monica Castell "Killing Moon" (Lunar Records)
- 2005 Maydrïm featuring Carita Boronska "Shakespeare’s Sister" (El Diablo)
- 2005 Nómadas "Creer En Mí" (Vale Music)

=== Remixes ===
- 2010 Compulsion "Monsters" (Maydrïm Remix)
- 2009 Munich 72 "Cuando Dices Que No" (Maydrïm Remix)
- 2006 In Strict Confidence "Promised Land" (Maydrïm Remix) on In Strict Confidence "The Serpent's Kiss" (Minuswelt Musikfabrik)
- 2000 Digital 21 "Anymore" (Maydrïm Remix)
- 1997 In The Dark "Number One" (Maydrïm Remix)

=== Featured songs ===
- 2008 Luis Ramiro "Estrella" on "Estrella" film soundtrack
- 2008 Marwan “El Próximo Verano" on Marwan “Trapecista” album
- 2005 Maydrïm featuring Monica Castell "Killing Moon" on Various Artistes "Play the Game: Tributo a Echo and the Bunnymen" (Lunar Records)
- 2005 Maydrïm featuring Carita Boronska "Shakespeare's Sister" on Various Artistes "Una luz que nunca se apagará: Tributo a The Smiths" (El Diablo)

=== Session recordings ===
- 2011 Amaral "Hacia Lo Salvaje" album (Antártida)
- 2010 La Mari (Chambao) on Niño Raro “Treinta y Tres” album
- 2009 OBK "Tal Vez" [Antipop Version]
- 2009 Zahara on Lucas "Palo Al Agua" album (EMI España)
- 2005 Danny Reus & The Gospel Factory on Lonely Joe “Songs From The Low Side” album (Subterfuge Records)
- 2002-4 Carita Boronska, advertising campaigns
- 2001 Naymi, debut album (Sony Music Media)
- 2001 Carles Benavent on José Ortega "La Rosa De Tu Piel" album

== See also ==
- Superbrands
- Rock Español
