= FourFiveSeconds =

2015 single by Rihanna, Kanye West and Paul McCartney

Single by Rihanna, Kanye West, and Paul McCartney
- Released: January 24, 2015
- Recorded: 2014
- Studio: Jungle City (New York City); Windmark (Santa Monica); No Name Studios (Mexico)
- Genre: Folk pop; pop rock; pop soul
- Length: 3:08
- Label: Roc Nation; Westbury Road
- Songwriters: Kanye West; Paul McCartney; Kirby Lauryen; Mike Dean; Tyrone Griffin; Dave Longstreth; Robyn Fenty; Dallas Austin; Elon Rutberg; Noah Goldstein
- Producers: West; McCartney

Rihanna singles chronology
"Can't Remember to Forget You" (2014)	"FourFiveSeconds" (2015)	"Towards the Sun" (2015)

Kanye West singles chronology
"Only One" (2014)	"FourFiveSeconds" (2015)	"Blessings" (2015)

Paul McCartney singles chronology
"Only One" (2014)	"FourFiveSeconds" (2015)	"All Day" (2015)

Music video
- "FourFiveSeconds" on YouTube

"FourFiveSeconds" is a song recorded by Barbadian singer Rihanna, American rapper Kanye West, and English musician Paul McCartney. It was written and produced by McCartney, West, Mike Dean, Dave Longstreth and Noah Goldstein with additional writing from Kirby Lauryen, Ty Dolla Sign, Dallas Austin, Elon Rutberg and Rihanna. Previewed by West at the iHeartMedia Music Summit on January 21, 2015, it was digitally released on January 24. "FourFiveSeconds" is a folk-pop and soul song with an instrumentation consisting of an acoustic guitar, organ and bass guitar.

"FourFiveSeconds" received acclaim from music critics who praised Rihanna's vocals on the song. Commercially, it peaked at number four on the US Billboard Hot 100 chart. In doing so it gave Rihanna her 26th top-ten song on the chart, while McCartney set a record by ending the longest break between top-ten singles on the chart (his last song to reach the top 10 was "Spies Like Us", reaching the top 10 in early 1986, meaning that the break was around 29 years long). The song also peaked at number one on the US Billboard Hot R&B/Hip-Hop Songs chart. Internationally, "FourFiveSeconds" reached number one in Australia, Denmark, Ireland, Luxembourg, New Zealand, Norway, and Sweden, as well as the top three in Canada, France, Germany, and the United Kingdom.

To promote the song, an accompanying black-and-white music video was directed by Dutch photographer duo Inez and Vinoodh in New York City. Rihanna, McCartney, and West performed "FourFiveSeconds" for the first time at the 57th Annual Grammy Awards on February 8 held at the Staples Center in Los Angeles; the performance received highly positive reviews. "FourFiveSeconds" has been covered by various recording artists, including Canadian rapper Drake and British singer-songwriter James Bay.

== Background and release ==
On January 21, 2015, Kanye West made a surprise appearance at the iHeartMedia Music Summit, where he teased a collaboration with Rihanna that "featured acoustic guitar and a big, soaring chorus and melody with a massive hook." Earlier, on January 2, recording artist and producer Ty Dolla Sign gave an interview to Billboard magazine where it revealed that he, West, Rihanna and Paul McCartney worked on a track together, which was yet to receive its final title. On January 24, Rihanna posted the song on her official website, Rihannanow.com. The song titled "FourFiveSeconds" was released as single being made available for digital download on January 24 via the iTunes Store. In the United Kingdom it was digitally released on January 26 via Amazon. A CD single featuring "FourFiveSeconds" and its music video was released on February 27 in Germany.

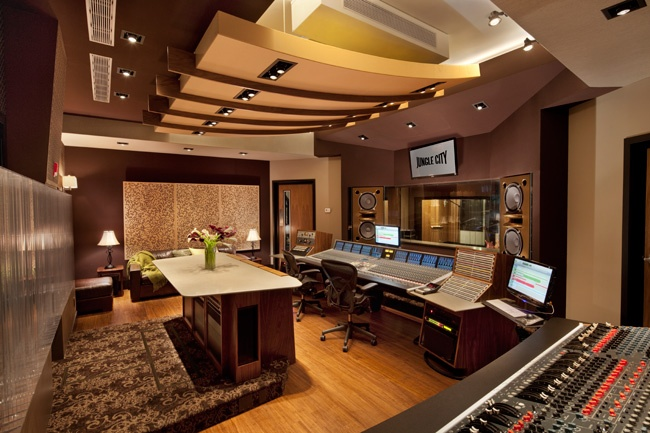
The Jungle City Studios in New York City was one of the studios where the song was recorded.

"FourFiveSeconds" was written by West, McCartney, Kirby Lauryen, Mike Dean, Sign, Dave Longstreth, Dallas Austin, Elon Rutberg, Noah Goldstein and Rihanna. It was produced by West and McCartney, co-produced by Dean, while additional production was provided by Longstreth and Goldstein. The single was recorded at the Jungle City Studios in New York City, Windmark Recording in Santa Monica, and No Name Studios in Mexico. Marcos Tovar along with Goldstein and Dean had done the recording of the vocals, while Brendan Morawski, Zeke Mishanec, Jeremy "Head" Hartney, Brandon Wood, and Jordan Heskett served as assistant recording engineers. The vocal production of the song was done by Kuk Harrell and it was mixed by Manny Marroquin at the Larabee Studios in Los Angeles. Assistant mixing was made by Chris Galland, Jeff Jackson, and Ike Schultz. McCartney played the acoustic guitar, Longstreth played the organ and Dean played the bass guitar. The three members of Wilson Phillips—Chynna Phillips, Carnie Wilson, and Wendy Wilson—provide backing vocals on the song. Carnie Wilson said the trio were invited to appear on the song by West.

On February 8, during his Grammy Awards red carpet interview, West explained how the collaboration came to fruition: "I'm executive producer of Rihanna's album, and I said I'd done a few songs with Paul McCartney and she couldn't get past this record. She had to have it on her album. ... So now we at the Grammys doing it". West further compared Rihanna's vocals on the song to that of Scottish singer Annie Lennox: "I feel like she has this type of energy in her vocals. And she even brought it to another level of like soul and heart and artistry". In an interview with V magazine, Rihanna revealed, "The thing that made me fall in love with ['FourFiveSeconds'] is the juxtaposition of the music and the lyrics. When you read the lyrics it's a completely different song than what you are hearing. The music is easygoing, but the lyrical content is very loud and in your face." Although it is a first collaboration by the trio, they have collaborated separately. West and McCartney collaborated on the 2014 single "Only One", a track dedicated to West's daughter North. Rihanna and West previously collaborated on Jay-Z's 2009 single "Run This Town"—which became a commercial success and peaked at number two on the Billboard Hot 100 chart—and West's 2011 single "All of the Lights", a track featuring backup vocals by John Legend, Fergie, and Elton John among others.

== Composition and lyrical interpretation ==
"FourFiveSeconds"
An 18-second sample of the chorus of "FourFiveSeconds", a stripped down pop acoustic song with country music influences that features minimalistic instrumentation consisting of acoustic guitar, organ, and bass guitar.

"FourFiveSeconds" is an acoustic folk-pop, pop, pop rock and soul pop song, with a length of three minutes and eight seconds. Critics noted how the song has a stripped back feel to it, and that it incorporates elements of country and folk. "FourFiveSeconds" makes use of a simple instrumentation, primarily consisting of an acoustic guitar and organ, as well as a bass guitar in the background. It has been noted that West sings his lines in the song instead of rapping them, which prompted Jim Farber of the Daily News to write that he could have done with auto-tune to smooth out his "unsteady vocals." "FourFiveSeconds" is written in the key of D major, in common time, with a tempo of 103 beats per minute. Rihanna and West's vocals span two octaves from the low note of D_{3} to the high note of D_{5}.

Billboard's Jocelyn Vena stated that the musical direction of the song represents a departure from the material present on Rihanna's most recent studio album, Unapologetic (2012), which incorporated EDM and dubstep. Hugh Mclntyre of Forbes also wrote that the song represents a change in musical direction for Rihanna and West, while noting that it is consistent with McCartney's style of music. Lanre Bakare of The Guardian described "FourFiveSeconds" as an "acoustic ballad" and the antithesis of what Rihanna and West's previous collaborations have sounded like. Writing for Vogue magazine, Alex Frank described the song as an "unplugged version" of Rihanna's 2011 single "We Found Love", and without the dance beats present on her previous singles.

The New York Post wrote that the lyrics "express emotions ranging from the flip to the resigned". Sharan Shetty of Slate stated that the song is about "heartbreak and redemption", while a Yahoo! News reviewer noted that it is about "personal travails and confusion". Nora Crotty of Elle magazine described the single as an "ode to repenting in the morning for the foolish mistakes you made the night before". Billboard's Vena stated that a "plucky acoustic guitar" accompanies Rihanna's vocals while she sings the lines, "I think I've had enough/ Might get a little drunk/ I say what's on my mind/ I might do a little time. Cause all of my kindness/ Is taken for weakness." After the first chorus West sings, "Woke up an optimist/ Sun was shining, I'm positive/ Then I heard you was talking trash/ Hold me back/ I'm about to spazz." On the second chorus, he and Rihanna harmonize as they sing, "Now I'm four, five seconds from wylin'/ And we got three more days 'till Friday/ I'm just trying to make it back home by Monday morning." McCartney's voice can be heard sped up underneath West's opening vocals. McCartney originally played his guitar part slower and in a lower key, which West later sped up for the finished release, thus causing McCartney's voice to sound much higher than its normal tone. McCartney's lyrics were improvised mid-performance and are for the most part drowned out by West's vocals except for the lines "We can run around" and "How 'bout a mystery."

== Critical reception ==
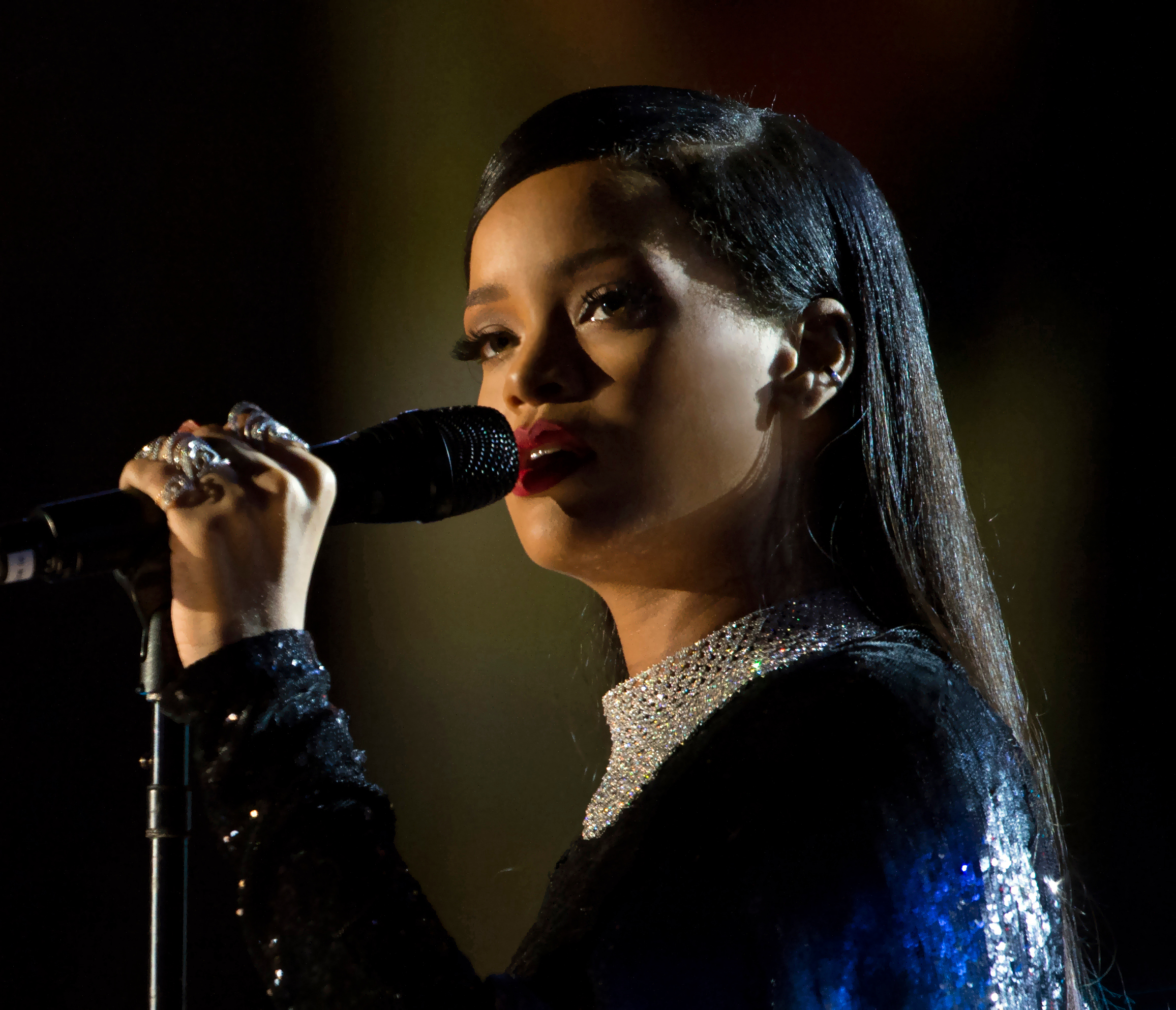
Rihanna's vocals on the song received praise from several music critics.

Peter Kandunias of Gigwise praised Rihanna's and West's vocals as well as McCartney's instrumentation. Mclntyre of Forbes noted: "The song puts the spotlight on Rihanna's vocals, highlighting them in a way that her club-ready, bombastic tunes don't usually." Jim Farber of New York Daily News stated that this collaboration is better than the previous West–McCartney collaboration. Additionally, he praised Rihanna's vocals and stated that they are a lot better than West's, "who could have used more auto-tune to firm his unsteady vocals". Farber further noted: "It's refreshing to hear Rihanna sing with so little affect, in a setting that's much less processed than most of her recordings". Vox's Kelsey McKinney noted that "Rihanna's voice shows significant growth in range and tone since her last album". She adds that Rihanna's performance in the opening of the song is "more vulnerable than we've heard Rihanna since 2012's 'Stay', and hints that her new album may contain more confessional slow jams like this one".

Spencer Kornhaber of The Atlantic wrote of Rihanna's vocals: "Listen to the ragged squeak in her voice in the first verse, and how she maintains control as she alternates between contemplative trills and gospel shouts during the bridge". According to Kornhaber, the song showcases "how distinctive her timbre and phrasing is", something that was not heard on her previous songs like the 2010 single "Only Girl (In the World)". Travis Grier of Def Pen Radio thought that the song is a good choice for Rihanna to achieve legendary status, as, "she's tackled pretty much every genre under the sun and 'FourFiveSeconds' just expands her versatility even more". Crotty of Elle wrote that the song is "awesome" and "sweet". Billboard named "FourFiveSeconds" the 21st best song of 2015.

=== Accolades ===
The song received a nomination for Collaboration of the Year at the American Music Awards of 2015. Although "FourFiveSeconds" was described by a Los Angeles Times writer as "tailor-made for multiple Grammy nominations" the song failed to receive a nomination in any category for the 2016 Grammy Awards.

Publication	Rank	List
Billboard	21	25 Best Songs of 2015
The Fader	2	107 Best Songs of 2015
Huffington Post	*	Best Songs of 2015 by Andy Parker
Rolling Stone	36	50 Best Songs of 2015
Stereogum	5	The 50 Best Pop Songs of 2015
Consequence of Sound	39	Top 50 Songs of 2015

(*) denotes an unordered list

== Chart performance ==
=== North America ===
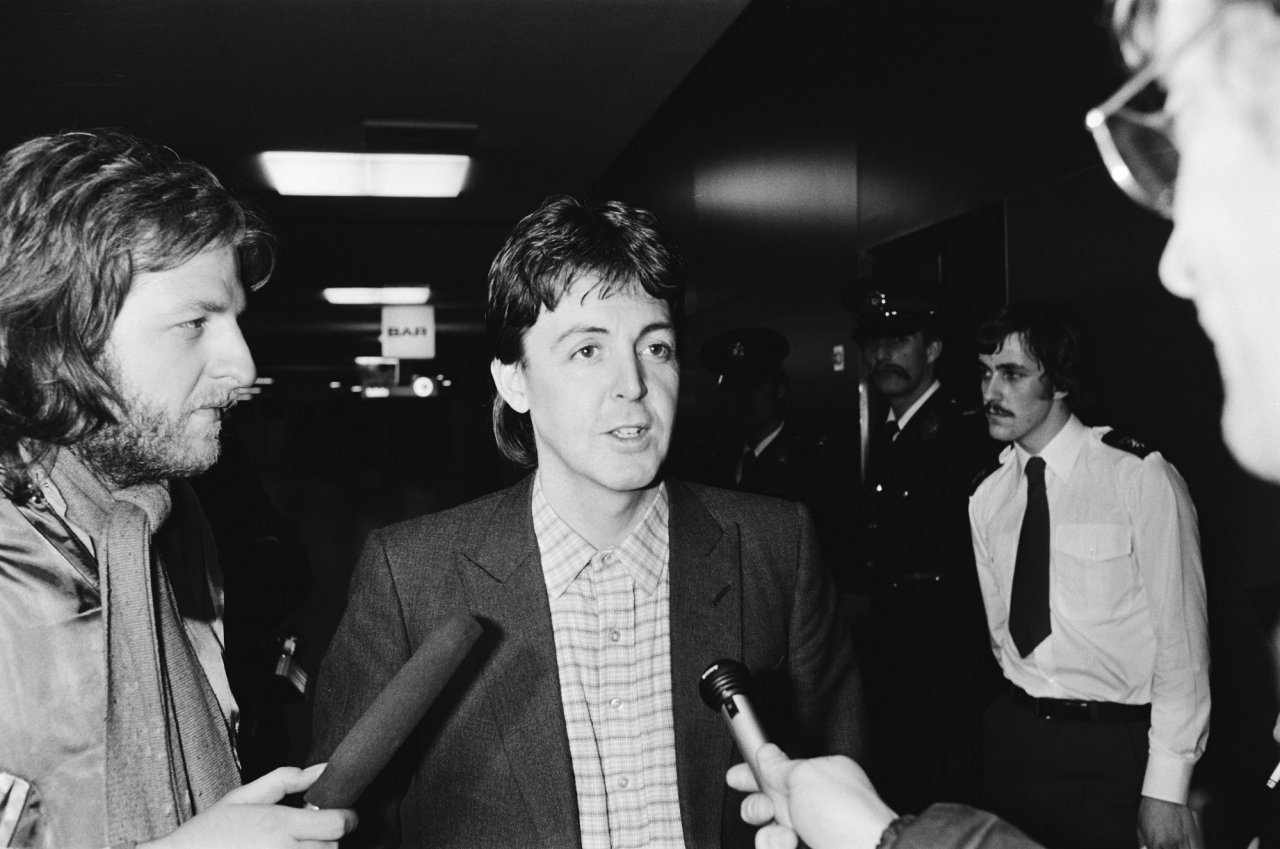
With the song's advance in the top ten on the US Billboard Hot 100, McCartney made record by ending the longest break between top-ten songs on the chart.

"FourFiveSeconds" debuted at number 37 on the US Mainstream Top 40 chart before the end of two days of airplay. Nielsen Music attributed the quick debut to hourly plays on radio stations owned by iHeartMedia. The song garnered 1,000 plays on 100 reports, with an audience reach of 7.4 million. "FourFiveSeconds" is Rihanna's 40th entry on the chart, while it is McCartney's first since the chart's launch in 1992. For the week dated January 31, 2015, the song debuted at number 54 on the US Billboard Hot 100 chart. with sales of 53,000 copies and became the chart's top new entry. Subsequently, it debuted at number 12 on the US Hot R&B/Hip-Hop Songs chart. The next week, it moved to number 25 on the Pop Songs chart, becoming its greatest gainer. Additionally, it debuted at number 34 on the US Adult Pop Songs chart and number 25 on the US Rhythmic Chart. On the Billboard Hot 100, it moved to number 15 with sales of over 138,000 digital downloads in its second week. It became McCartney's highest-charting single since 1986 when his single "Spies Like Us" reached number seven on the chart. The same week, it moved ten places from number 12 to number two on the Hot R&B/Hip Hop Songs chart.

In its third week, the song jumped to number six on the Billboard Hot 100 as a result of the digital downloads; it sold 181,000 copies for the week and peaked at number three on the Digital Songs chart. It marked McCartney's first top-ten on the Hot 100 chart after 29 years. He surpassed Santana, who recorded a span of 28 years between his top-tens from 1971 to 1999, thus ending the longest break between top-ten songs in the 56-year history of the chart. "FourFiveSeconds" became Rihanna's 26th top-ten single on the chart and West's 15th. The same week, it topped the US Hot R&B/Hip-Hop Songs chart and became Rihanna's fourth number one, while West's seventh. It was McCartney's second number-one song on the chart following his 1983 duet with Michael Jackson, "The Girl Is Mine". In the song's fourth week on the Billboard Hot 100 chart, the song moved two places and peaked at number four. The song became West's highest-charting single on the Billboard Hot 100 since "Heartless", which peaked at number two in 2009. It also became McCartney's first top-five hit in 31 years, one month, and one week; his last top-five hit was his 1983 collaboration with Jackson, "Say Say Say", which became his ninth solo number-one single. For the issue dated March 7, "FourFiveSeconds" moved to number 10 on the Pop Songs chart with an audience impression of over 70 million. With the achievement, Rihanna tied Mariah Carey for most top 10 songs on the chart; each of them has 23 top 10 singles. Although it did not chart on the US Hot Country Songs chart, it has received airplay on a number of country stations in major metropolitan areas. As of July 2015, "FourFiveSeconds" has sold 1,868,000 copies in the United States.

In Canada, "FourFiveSeconds" debuted at number 65 on the Canadian Hot 100 for the week dated February 7. The next week it jumped 56 places to number nine with the biggest gain in digital sales and radio airplay for that issue. In its third week it peaked at number four on the chart. "FourFiveSeconds" reached its peak of number three on the chart in its sixth week, for the issue date March 14. As of July 2015, "FourFiveSeconds" has sold 289,000 copies in Canada.

=== Oceania and Europe ===
In Australia, "FourFiveSeconds" debuted at number 13 on the singles chart for the week dated February 8, 2015. The next week it jumped to number three and became Rihanna's 28th top-ten song on the chart. For the week dated February 16, the song topped the chart and became Rihanna's ninth song to reach number one. It also became West's second chart-topper and McCartney's third (post Beatles). With the feat, McCartney became the oldest artist at age 72 to reach number one on the chart, a record which was previously held by American singer Cher; she was 52 when her single "Believe" topped the chart. Furthermore, "FourFiveSeconds" also peaked at number one on the Australian Urban Singles Chart. By 2020, the single was certified 7× platinum by the Australian Recording Industry Association (ARIA), denoting equivalent sales of over 490,000 units. In New Zealand, it debuted at number nine and peaked at number one for the week dated March 9. It became Rihanna's 31st top-ten single and sixth number-one on the chart. "FourFiveSeconds" topped the charts for five consecutive weeks and was certified double platinum by the Recording Industry Association of New Zealand (RIANZ) for selling over 30,000 copies in the country.

In the United Kingdom, "FourFiveSeconds" debuted at number five on the UK Singles Chart for the week ending date February 7, 2015. The next week it reached a peak of number four and sold 41,535 digital downloads. On March 8, 2015, the track reached a new peak of three on the chart. and has sold over 452,000 copies in the country, as of April 2015. As of September 2017, the song was the 311th best-selling song of all time in the UK (including streaming equivalent sales). In Ireland, the song debuted at number fourteen on the Irish Singles Chart for the week dated January 29. On March 19, in its eight-week on the chart, it reached number one. "FourFiveSeconds" attained commercial success in continental Europe too and reached the top five on over 18 national charts. It debuted at number one on the Swedish Singles Chart on March 6 and stayed on the position for two consecutive weeks. It became the fourth Swedish number-one song for Rihanna, second for McCartney, and first for West. It was certified double platinum by the Swedish Recording Industry Association (GLF) and sold over 80,000 digital copies in the country alone.

"FourFiveSeconds" debuted at number 10 on the Danish Singles Chart on March 6. The next week topped the chart and became Rihanna's sixth and McCartney and West's first number-one single on the chart. It stayed on the top of it for four consecutive weeks and was certified gold by IFPI Denmark for shipping over 30,000 copies of the song in the country. The single debuted at number 39 in the sixth week of the Norwegian Singles Chart and the next week it fell off it. In its tenth week, the song re-entered at number 11. In the twelfth week of the chart, "FourFiveSeconds" topped the chart and became Rihanna's eighth, McCartney's third, and West's first chart-topper in the country. The single reached number four in both Italy and Spain. In the former it was certified gold by the Federation of the Italian music industry (FIMI) denoting sales/streams of 25,000 copies. On the Swiss Singles Chart, the song peaked at number three and stayed on the position for seven consecutive weeks. It was certified gold by the IFPI Switzerland for selling over 15,000 copies in the country alone. "FourFiveSeconds" was also successful in France, where it peaked at number two on the singles chart after previously debuting at number 18.

== Music video ==
=== Development ===
The accompanying music video for "FourFiveSeconds" was directed by Dutch photographer duo, Inez and Vinoodh and shot in late December 2014 in New York City. Stephanie Bargas, Jeff Lepine, and Jon Barlow served as the visual's producers, while theCollectiveShift executively produced it. Jodokus Driessen was the director of photography, with Otto Arsenault serving both as editor and cinematographer. On January 30, 2015, via her official YouTube channel, Rihanna posted a behind the scenes video from the making of the clip. The video features Rihanna, West, and McCartney performing against a white background. She explained the fashion that they used for the video, "Kanye came up with the idea of doing just some real street, denim, all-American-type look. Denim never goes out of style; it's classic, it's iconic, just like the Beatles." On February 2, Rihanna posted a snippet of the clip on her official Instagram account. It shows the singer in silhouette as she sings the lyrics; she is wearing a Sean John throwback denim jacket. The video premiered on February 3 on Rihanna's official Vevo channel on YouTube. The same day, it was digitally released on the iTunes Store.

=== Analysis and reception ===
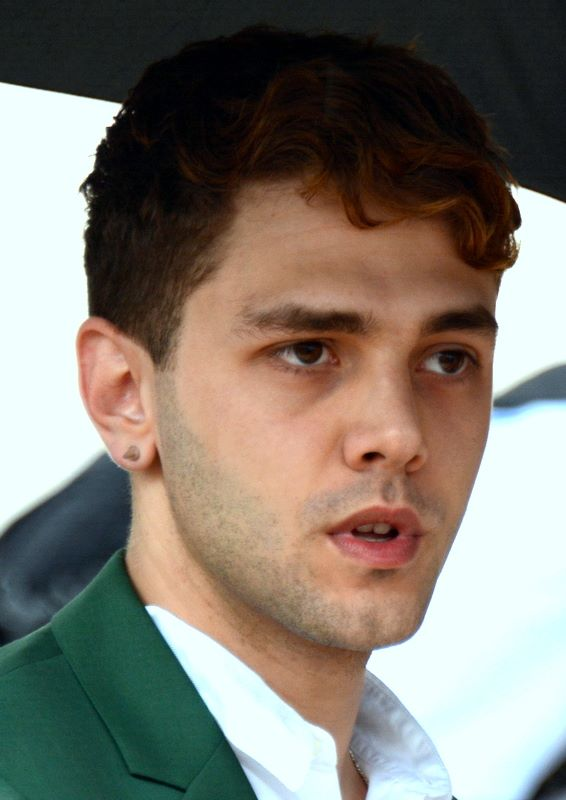
The music video for "FourFiveSeconds" was compared to the works of the photographer Herb Ritts and filmmaker Xavier Dolan (pictured).

According to Daniel Kreps of Rolling Stone, "The Herb Ritts-esque black-and-white clip finds Rihanna and West just singing their collaborative track while McCartney strums the riff on an acoustic guitar, with the real highlight coming when the three musical titans share the same frame." Steven Gottlieb of VideoStatic described it as, "vertically constrained to just the center third of the screen, the focus of this silvery black-and-white clip is Rihanna's emotional performance", while McCartney and West supported her role. According to Erin Strecker of Billboard the video allows "each of the three superstars their moment in the spotlight. The camera mostly switches between tight individual shots of each denim-clad, passionate performer, although there are also a few scenes of all three together". Jessica Goodman of The Huffington Post described the video as "simple and clean, much like the song". Similarly, Nolan Feeney of Time called the video simple, but also "surprisingly intimate" like the single. He also described Rihanna's eye-roll in the video as "epic". Additionally, Feeney noted that the video is shot in a square aspect ratio and compared it to the works of French-Canadian filmmaker Xavier Dolan.

A reviewer of MTV UK noted that the video is set in a square frame and resembles the single's artwork. Sophie Schillaci of Entertainment Tonight called the square "Instagram friendly". VH1's Alexa Tietjen called the visual "stunning" and further praised Rihanna's looks, West's attitude, and McCartney's "social media skills". Dee Locket of Slate called the visual a "performance video" in which Rihanna and West "appear to be on the verge of losing it". Billy Johnson Jr. of Yahoo! Music stated that if the visual wanted to depict Rihanna "as a fragile woman on the verge of snapping", it succeeded: "Stylistically, the black and white video finds a happy medium between the look and feel of Abercrombie & Fitch and Gap ad campaigns with Rihanna [baring] just enough cleavage to make censors nervous." Rachel Maresca of Daily News noted that West vents his aggression by kicking the camera. The video was nominated for Best International Video at the 2015 Much Music Video Awards.

== Live performances and covers ==
Rihanna, McCartney, and West performed "FourFiveSeconds" at the 57th Annual Grammy Awards held on February 8, 2015, at the Staples Center in Los Angeles. Chris Payne of Billboard named the performance as one of the best moments of the ceremony and praised Rihanna's vocals, "Let's face it – seeing this improbable collaboration in person is the main reason many tuned in. There are so many ways three huge personas can get in the way, but Rihanna, 'Ye, and Sir Paul knew how to bring this one to life". Joe Lynch of the same publication listed the performance at fourth out of the total of 23 performances that night, writing, "'FourFiveSeconds' ironically takes time to grow on you, but the presence of three disparate pop stars on stage with each other was one of the most deliriously awesome Grammy highlights". Isabella Biedenharn of Entertainment Weekly graded the performance an "A" and praised Rihanna and West's vocals and the trio's wardrobe. According to TiVo, the performance was the fifth most-viewed segment of the night. On April 4, Rihanna performed at the Final Four of the March Madness 2015 which was held in Indianapolis, Indiana. During the performance, she sang a solo version of "FourFiveSeconds", as well as, her new songs "Bitch Better Have My Money" and "American Oxygen" among others. McCartney added the song to his setlists, and was joined by Rihanna for a performance at the Desert Trip festival in October 2016.

Canadian rapper Drake covered the song during his performance at the Sprite NBA All-Star Weekend concert held at the Irving Plaza in New York City on February 14. Welsh band Punk Rock Factory recorded a cover of the song, transforming it into "a punk rock anthem". English singer-songwriter James Bay covered "FourFiveSeconds" during the BBC Radio 1 Lounge on March 3. Australian pop singer Cody Simpson performed an acoustic version of the single during his visit on SiriusXM radio. Christina Garibaldi of MTV News, regarding the performance, wrote, "The 'New Problems' singer effortlessly covers Rihanna and Kanye's verses while giving off some serious John Mayer vibes." Rihanna also performed the song on the South American dates in late September 2015. One of the shows was one of the nights of the Rock in Rio festival, held in Rio de Janeiro, Brazil. One Direction covered the song during the BBC Radio One Live Lounge on November 13.

Rihanna performed the song on the Anti World Tour. Paul McCartney regularly performed "FourFiveSeconds" on his 2016/17 One on One Tour.

Ariana Grande, with her team members Holly Forbes and Jim and Sasha Allen, performed this song on episode twenty of the 21st season of The Voice.

== Track listing ==
Digital download
No.	Title	Length
1.	"FourFiveSeconds"	3:08

CD single
No.	Title	Length
1.	"FourFiveSeconds"	3:08
2.	"FourFiveSeconds" (Music video)	3:12

== Credits and personnel ==
Credits adapted from the liner notes of the CD single of "FourFiveSeconds" and ASCAP.

Locations

- Recorded at Jungle City Studios, New York City, New York; Windmark Recording, Santa Monica, California; No Name Studios, Mexico
- Mixed at Larabee Studios, Los Angeles, California

Personnel

- Production – Kanye West, Paul McCartney
- Co-production, fuzz bass – Mike Dean
- Additional production – Dave Longstreth, Noah Goldstein
- Vocal production – Kuk Harrell
- Recording – Marcos Tovar, Noah Goldstein, Mike Dean
- Assistant recording engineer – Brendan Morawski, Zeke Mishanec, Jeremy "Head" Hartney, Brandon Wood, Jordan Heskett
- Mixing – Manny Marroquin
- Assistant mixing – Chris Galland, Jeff Jackson, Ike Schultz
- Acoustic guitar – Paul McCartney
- Organ – Dave Longstreth
- Backing vocals - Chynna Phillips, Carnie Wilson, Wendy Wilson

== Charts ==
=== Weekly charts ===
Chart (2015)	Peak position
Australia (ARIA)	1
Australia Urban (ARIA)	1
Austria (Ö3 Austria Top 40)	2
Belgium (Ultratop 50 Flanders)	5
Belgium Urban (Ultratop Flanders)	2
Belgium (Ultratop 50 Wallonia)	7
Canada Hot 100 (Billboard)	3
Czech Republic Airplay (ČNS IFPI)	2
Czech Republic Singles Digital (ČNS IFPI)	4
Denmark (Tracklisten)	1
Dominican Republic (Monitor Latino)	3
Euro Digital Song Sales (Billboard)	2
Finland (Suomen virallinen lista)	7
France (SNEP)	2
Germany (GfK)	3
Germany Airplay (BVMI)	1
Hungary (Rádiós Top 40)	3
Hungary (Single Top 40)	3
Hungary (Stream Top 40)	4
Ireland (IRMA)	1
Italy (FIMI)	4
Israel International Airplay (Media Forest)	1
Japan Hot 100 (Billboard)	37
Lebanon (Lebanese Top 20)	6
Mexico (Billboard Ingles Airplay)	10
Netherlands (Dutch Top 40)	2
Netherlands (Single Top 100)	2
New Zealand (Recorded Music NZ)	1
Norway (VG-lista)	1
Poland Airplay (ZPAV)	3
Romania (Airplay 100)	45
Scottish Singles Sales (Official Charts)	2
Slovakia Airplay (ČNS IFPI)	1
Slovakia Singles Digital (ČNS IFPI)	4
Slovenia (SloTop50)	2
South Africa Airplay (EMA)	5
Spain (Promusicae)	10
Sweden (Sverigetopplistan)	1
Switzerland (Schweizer Hitparade)	3
UK Singles (Official Charts)	3
US Billboard Hot 100	4
US Adult Contemporary (Billboard)	18
US Adult Pop Airplay (Billboard)	12
US Dance Airplay (Billboard)	8
US Pop Airplay (Billboard)	6
US Hot R&B/Hip-Hop Songs (Billboard)	1
US Rhythmic Airplay (Billboard)	6

=== Year-end charts ===
Chart (2015)	Position
Australia (ARIA)	10
Australia Urban (ARIA)	3
Austria (Ö3 Austria Top 40)	12
Belgium (Ultratop 50 Flanders)	31
Belgium Urban (Ultratop Flanders)	8
Belgium (Ultratop 50 Wallonia)	53
Canada (Canadian Hot 100)	22
France (SNEP)	30
Germany (Official German Charts)	25
Hungary (Rádiós Top 40)	55
Hungary (Single Top 40)	28
Ireland (IRMA)	18
Israel (Media Forest)	5
Italy (FIMI)	27
Netherlands (Dutch Top 40)	13
Netherlands (Single Top 100)	19
New Zealand (Recorded Music NZ)	8
Poland (ZPAV)	35
Slovenia (SloTop50)	11
Spain (PROMUSICAE)	61
Sweden (Sverigetopplistan)	19
Switzerland (Schweizer Hitparade)	19
UK Singles (Official Charts Company)	18
US Billboard Hot 100	42
US Hot R&B/Hip-Hop Songs (Billboard)	11
US Mainstream Top 40 (Billboard)	44
US Rhythmic (Billboard)	46

Chart (2016)	Position
Australia Urban (ARIA)	40

== Certifications ==
Region	Certification	Certified units/sales
Australia (ARIA)	11× Platinum	770,000^{‡}
Austria (IFPI Austria)	Gold	15,000^{‡}
Belgium (BRMA)	Platinum	20,000^{‡}
Brazil (Pro-Música Brasil)	3× Platinum	180,000^{‡}
Canada	—	310,000
Denmark (IFPI Danmark)	4× Platinum	360,000^{‡}
France (SNEP)	Gold	75,000^{*}
Germany (BVMI)	3× Gold	600,000^{‡}
Italy (FIMI)	3× Platinum	150,000^{‡}
New Zealand (RMNZ)	7× Platinum	210,000^{‡}
Poland (ZPAV)	3× Platinum	60,000^{‡}
Spain (Promusicae)	Platinum	40,000^{‡}
Sweden (GLF)	4× Platinum	160,000^{‡}
Switzerland (IFPI Switzerland)	Platinum	30,000^{‡}
United Kingdom (BPI)	3× Platinum	1,800,000^{‡}
United States (RIAA)	5× Platinum	5,000,000^{‡}
^{*} Sales figures based on certification alone.^{‡} Sales+streaming figures based on certification alone.

== Release history ==
"FourFiveSeconds" release history
Country	Date	Format	Label(s)	Ref.
Canada	January 24, 2015	Digital download	Roc Nation; Westbury Road	
United States	January 24, 2015	Digital download	Roc Nation; Westbury Road	
Australia	January 25, 2015	Digital download	Roc Nation; Westbury Road	
Austria	January 25, 2015	Digital download	Roc Nation; Westbury Road	
Denmark	January 25, 2015	Digital download	Roc Nation; Westbury Road	
France	January 25, 2015	Digital download	Roc Nation; Westbury Road	
Germany	January 25, 2015	Digital download	Roc Nation; Westbury Road	
Italy	January 25, 2015	Digital download	Roc Nation; Westbury Road	
New Zealand	January 25, 2015	Digital download	Roc Nation; Westbury Road	
Spain	January 25, 2015	Digital download	Roc Nation; Westbury Road	
Turkey	January 25, 2015	Digital download	Roc Nation; Westbury Road	
United Kingdom	January 26, 2015	Digital download	Virgin EMI	
Italy	January 30, 2015	Radio airplay	Universal	
Germany	February 27, 2015	CD	Roc Nation	

== See also ==
- List of number-one singles of 2015 (Australia)
- List of number-one R&B/hip-hop songs of 2015 (U.S.)
- List of UK top-ten singles in 2015
- List of number-one singles from the 2010s (New Zealand)
- List of number-one singles and albums in Sweden
- List of number-one hits of 2015 (Denmark)
- List of number-one songs in Norway
- List of number-one singles of 2015 (Ireland)
- List of highest-certified singles in Australia
