= Only One (Kanye West song) =

2014 single by Kanye West featuring Paul McCartney

Single by Kanye West featuring Paul McCartney
- Released: December 31, 2014
- Recorded: September 2014
- Genre: Soul
- Length: 4:42
- Label: GOOD; Def Jam
- Songwriters: Kanye West; Paul McCartney; Kirby Lauryen; Mike Dean; Noah Goldstein
- Producers: West; McCartney; Dean; Goldstein

Kanye West singles chronology
"Nobody" (2014)	"Only One" (2014)	"FourFiveSeconds" (2015)

Paul McCartney singles chronology
"Hope for the Future" (2014)	"Only One" (2014)	"FourFiveSeconds" (2015)

Audio sample
- file; help

"Only One" is a song by the American rapper Kanye West, featuring English musician Paul McCartney. The song was released on December 31, 2014, and was the first song released by West after the release of his sixth studio album Yeezus.

The song was written by West, McCartney, Noah Goldstein, Mike Dean, and Kirby Lauryen. Produced by the former four, the song is a tribute to West's daughter, North, and is sung as a message to West from the perspective of his late mother, Donda West. McCartney is featured as a musician, playing electric piano throughout the track. Ty Dolla Sign contributes backing vocals at several points in the song.

== Background ==
The song was recorded over a two-day period in Mexico in September 2014 in which West and McCartney, alongside other artists, recorded upwards of nine songs.

The track was released on December 31, 2014, to the iTunes Store. The track features English musician and former member of the Beatles and Wings, Paul McCartney. "Only One" was the first of three McCartney–West collaborations to be released commercially, as the two would later appear on "FourFiveSeconds" alongside singer Rihanna, released just twenty-four days after "Only One", as well as on West's "All Day".

Kanye West is described in a press release as not being able to remember singing the words to "Only One" when he and McCartney were later reviewing the early 2014 sessions that generated the song. Later, West "realized that perhaps the words had never really come from him … he understood in that moment that his late mother, Dr. Donda West, who was also his mentor, confidante, and best friend, had spoken through him that day ... A message had been passed down through generations."

West's then-wife Kim Kardashian tweeted upon the release of the track that it is her favorite track by West, saying, "People always ask me what my favorite Kanye song is and it's 'Only One'. Kanye feels like his mom sang thru him to our daughter."

== Live performances ==
- 57th Annual Grammy Awards (February 8, 2015)
- Saturday Night Live (February 15, 2015)
- Skavlan (February 27, 2015)
- The Jonathan Ross Show (March 15, 2015)

== Music video ==
On the episode of The Ellen DeGeneres Show which aired January 29, 2015, West revealed a preview of the music video for "Only One", directed by Spike Jonze on his iPhone. West tweeted a link to the full music video available to watch on his web site later the same day. The video was shot in the minimalist style that West had been continuously using. It sees West walking through a soggy field with his daughter North, who was 18 months old at the time, and he is silhouetted by fog. Pitchfork Media named "Only One" the sixth best music video of 2015.

== Chart performance ==
"Only One" debuted at number 35 on the Billboard Hot 100 on the chart dated January 17, 2015. Its debut was mainly on the strength of digital download sales; it sold 125,000 copies during its first week, making it the week's tenth-best selling single. It also marked McCartney's first top 40 hit in the United States in over 25 years, when 1989's "My Brave Face" had reached number 25. Following three weeks on sale in the United States, "Only One" had sold 230,000 total copies. On 28 July 2015, the song was certified Gold by the Recording Industry Association of America.

The song also debuted at number 35 in the UK Singles Chart on the chart dated January 10, 2015. On its second week on the chart, the song rose to number 28.

In New Zealand, the song debuted at number 8 on the New Zealand Singles Chart, marking West's first top ten single there since Jay-Z's 2009 single "Run This Town", and first top ten as a lead artist since 2008's "Heartless". It also marks Paul McCartney's first charting single there since his 1993 single "Hope of Deliverance" and first top ten single since 1983's "Say Say Say" with Michael Jackson.

== Personnel ==
Credits adapted from Tidal.

- Kanye West - songwriter, producer, lead vocals
- Paul McCartney - songwriter, producer, electric piano
- Mike Dean – songwriter, additional producer, synthesizers
- Noah Goldstein – songwriter, additional producer, engineer, studio personnel
- Kirby Lauryen – songwriter
- Ty Dolla Sign – additional vocals
- Manny Marroquin – mixing engineer, studio personnel
- Chris Galland – assistant mixer, studio personnel
- Ike Schultz – assistant mixer, studio personnel
- Jeff Jackson – assistant mixer, studio personnel

== Charts ==
=== Weekly charts ===
Weekly chart performance for "Only One"
Chart (2015)	Peak position
Australia (ARIA)	8
Austria (Ö3 Austria Top 40)	31
Belgium (Ultratip Bubbling Under Flanders)	18
Belgium Urban (Ultratop Flanders)	10
Belgium (Ultratip Bubbling Under Wallonia)	20
Canada Hot 100 (Billboard)	31
Czech Republic Singles Digital (ČNS IFPI)	34
Denmark (Tracklisten)	31
France (SNEP)	30
Germany (GfK)	32
Ireland (IRMA)	43
Italy (Musica e Dischi)	24
Hungary (Single Top 40)	19
Japan Hot 100 (Billboard)	34
Mexico Ingles Airplay (Billboard)	27
New Zealand (Recorded Music NZ)	8
Netherlands (Single Top 100)	82
Scottish Singles Sales (Official Charts)	14
Spain (Promusicae)	21
Sweden (Sverigetopplistan)	85
Switzerland (Schweizer Hitparade)	39
UK Singles (Official Charts)	28
UK Hip Hop/R&B (Official Charts)	1
US Billboard Hot 100	35
US Hot R&B/Hip-Hop Songs (Billboard)	11
US Rhythmic Airplay (Billboard)	23

=== Year-end charts ===
Year-end chart performance for "Only One"
Chart (2015)	Position
Australia Urban Singles (ARIA)	31
US Hot R&B Songs (Billboard)	25

== Certifications ==
Region	Certification	Certified units/sales
Denmark (IFPI Danmark)	Gold	45,000^{‡}
United States (RIAA)	Platinum	1,000,000^{‡}
^{‡} Sales+streaming figures based on certification alone.

== Release history ==
Release dates for "Only One"
Region	Date	Format	Label	Ref.
United States	December 31, 2014	Digital download	Def Jam	
United States	January 12, 2015	Contemporary hit radio	Def Jam	
United States	January 12, 2015	Urban contemporary	Def Jam	
United States	January 12, 2015	Rhythmic contemporary	Def Jam	
United States	January 12, 2015	Hot adult contemporary	Def Jam	
United States	January 12, 2015	Adult album alternative	Def Jam	

== See also ==
- List of UK R&B Singles Chart number ones of 2015
