= List of UK R&B Singles Chart number ones of 2015 =

The logo of the Official Charts Company, responsible for compiling all of the official music charts in the United Kingdom, including the R&B singles chart.

The UK R&B Singles Chart is a weekly chart that ranks the 40 biggest-selling singles and albums that are classified in the R&B genre in the United Kingdom. The chart is compiled by the Official Charts Company, and is based on both physical, Streaming and digital sales.

The following are the songs which have topped the UK R&B Singles Chart in 2015.

== Number-one singles ==
Key
†	Best-selling R&B single of the year

Chart date (week ending)	Single	Artist(s)	Record label	References
3 January^{[b]}	"All of Me"	John Legend	GOOD Music/Columbia	
10 January	"Only One"	Kanye West featuring Paul McCartney	Def Jam/Roc-A-Fella	
17 January	"Only One"	Kanye West featuring Paul McCartney	Def Jam/Roc-A-Fella	
24 January	"Don't Tell 'Em"	Jeremih featuring YG	Def Jam	
31 January	"Don't Tell 'Em"	Jeremih featuring YG	Def Jam	
7 February	"L.A. Love (La La)"	Fergie	Interscope/will.i.am Music Group	
14 February	"L.A. Love (La La)"	Fergie	Interscope/will.i.am Music Group	
21 February	"Ayo"	Chris Brown & Tyga	RCA	
28 February	"Earned It"	The Weeknd	Republic	
7 March	"Earned It"	The Weeknd	Republic	
14 March	"Earned It"	The Weeknd	Republic	
21 March	"GDFR"	Flo Rida featuring Sage the Gemini & Lookas	Atlantic	
28 March	"GDFR"	Flo Rida featuring Sage the Gemini & Lookas	Atlantic	
4 April	"Earned It"	The Weeknd	Republic	
11 April	"Earned It"	The Weeknd	Republic	
18 April	"GDFR"	Flo Rida featuring Sage the Gemini & Lookas	Atlantic	
25 April^{[a]}^{[b]}	"See You Again" †	Wiz Khalifa featuring Charlie Puth	Atlantic	
2 May^{[a]}^{[b]}	"See You Again" †	Wiz Khalifa featuring Charlie Puth	Atlantic	
9 May^{[b]}	"See You Again" †	Wiz Khalifa featuring Charlie Puth	Atlantic	
16 May	"See You Again" †	Wiz Khalifa featuring Charlie Puth	Atlantic	
23 May^{[b]}	"See You Again" †	Wiz Khalifa featuring Charlie Puth	Atlantic	
30 May	"See You Again" †	Wiz Khalifa featuring Charlie Puth	Atlantic	
6 June	"See You Again" †	Wiz Khalifa featuring Charlie Puth	Atlantic	
13 June	"Somebody"	Natalie La Rose featuring Jeremih	Republic	
20 June	"See You Again" †	Wiz Khalifa featuring Charlie Puth	Atlantic	
27 June	"Trap Queen"	Fetty Wap	300 Entertainment	
4 July^{[a]}	"Not Letting Go"	Tinie Tempah featuring Jess Glynne	Parlophone	
9 July	"Not Letting Go"	Tinie Tempah featuring Jess Glynne	Parlophone	
16 July	"Not Letting Go"	Tinie Tempah featuring Jess Glynne	Parlophone	
23 July	"Not Letting Go"	Tinie Tempah featuring Jess Glynne	Parlophone	
30 July	"Not Letting Go"	Tinie Tempah featuring Jess Glynne	Parlophone	
6 August	"Not Letting Go"	Tinie Tempah featuring Jess Glynne	Parlophone	
13 August	"Can't Feel My Face"	The Weeknd	Republic	
20 August	"Can't Feel My Face"	The Weeknd	Republic	
27 August	"Can't Feel My Face"	The Weeknd	Republic	
3 September	"Can't Feel My Face"	The Weeknd	Republic	
10 September ^{[b]}	"Can't Feel My Face"	The Weeknd	Republic	
17 September ^{[b]}	"Can't Feel My Face"	The Weeknd	Republic	
24 September ^{[b]}	"Can't Feel My Face"	The Weeknd	Republic	
1 October	"Can't Feel My Face"	The Weeknd	Republic	
8 October ^{[b]}	"Can't Feel My Face"	The Weeknd	Republic	
15 October	"Hotline Bling"	Drake	Republic	
22 October	"Hotline Bling"	Drake	Republic	
29 October	"The Hills"	The Weeknd	Republic	
5 November	"Hotline Bling"	Drake	Republic	
12 November	"The Hills"	The Weeknd	Republic	
19 November	"In2"	WSTRN	Atlantic	
26 November	"In2"	WSTRN	Atlantic	
3 December	"In2"	WSTRN	Atlantic	
10 December	"In2"	WSTRN	Atlantic	
17 December	"In2"	WSTRN	Atlantic	
24 December	"Shut Up"	Stormzy	Stormzy	
31 December	"Shut Up"	Stormzy	Stormzy	

== Notes ==
- ^{a} - The single was simultaneously number-one on the UK Singles Chart.
- ^{b} - The artist was simultaneously number-one on the R&B Albums Chart.

== See also ==
- List of UK Singles Chart number ones of 2015
- List of UK R&B Albums Chart number ones of 2015
- List of UK Dance Singles Chart number ones of 2015
