= Can't Stop Playing (Makes Me High) =

2015 single by Dr Kucho! and Gregor Salto

- UK single cover

Single by Dr. Kucho! and Gregor Salto featuring Ane Brun
- Released: 12 April 2015
- Genre: Future house
- Length: 2:37
- Label: Spinnin' Records; Ministry of Sound (UK)
- Songwriters: Ane Brun, Dr. Kucho!, Gregor van Offeren

"Can't Stop Playing" is a song by electronic music producers Dr. Kucho! and Gregor Salto. Released in 2005, it reached the top 20 in the Netherlands. On 29 August 2014, a remix by Dutch producer Oliver Heldens and Gregor Salto was released through Spinnin' Records, and reached number one on Beatport's download chart shortly after its release. A vocal version of the remix featuring Norwegian singer Ane Brun was subsequently produced, titled "Can't Stop Playing (Makes Me High)", and it was released in the United Kingdom through Ministry of Sound on 12 April 2015, where it debuted and peaked at number four on the UK Singles Chart.

== Track listings ==
- 2015 UK digital download
1. "Can't Stop Playing (Makes Me High)" (Oliver Heldens Vocal Edit) (feat. Ane Brun) – 2:37
- 2015 UK digital download (remixes)
1. "Can't Stop Playing" (Oliver Heldens & Gregor Salto Remix Edit) – 4:15
2. "Can't Stop Playing (Makes Me High)" (Cyantific Remix) (feat. Ane Brun) – 3:51
3. "Can't Stop Playing (Makes Me High)" (Joker Remix) (feat. Ane Brun) – 3:28
4. "Can't Stop Playing (Makes Me High)" (Danny Howard Remix) (feat. Ane Brun) – 5:27
5. "Can't Stop Playing" (Dr. Kucho! Remix) – 6:43
6. "Can't Stop Playing (Makes Me High)" (Oliver Heldens Vocal Extended) (feat. Ane Brun) – 4:31

== Charts and certifications ==
=== Original version ===
==== Weekly charts ====
Chart (2005)	Peak position
Belgium (Ultratop 50 Flanders)	33
Belgium (Ultratip Bubbling Under Wallonia)	2
Netherlands (Dutch Top 40)	12
Netherlands (Single Top 100)	16

==== Year-end charts ====
Chart (2005)	Position
Netherlands (Dutch Top 40)	90

=== Oliver Heldens and Gregor Salto remix ===
==== Weekly charts ====
Chart (2014)	Peak position
Belgium (Ultratop 50 Flanders)	38
Netherlands (Single Top 100)	66

=== "Can't Stop Playing (Makes Me High)" ===
==== Weekly charts ====
Chart (2015)	Peak position
Belgium (Ultratip Bubbling Under Flanders)	17
Belgium (Ultratip Bubbling Under Wallonia)	37
Ireland (IRMA)	66
Scottish Singles Sales (Official Charts)	3
UK Dance (Official Charts)	1
UK Indie (Official Charts)	1
UK Singles (Official Charts)	4

==== Year-end charts ====
Chart (2015)	Position
Poland (ZPAV)	48

==== Certifications ====
Region	Certification	Certified units/sales
United Kingdom (BPI)	Platinum	600,000^{‡}
^{‡} Sales+streaming figures based on certification alone.

== Release history ==
Country	Date	Format	Label
United Kingdom	12 April 2015	Digital download	Ministry of Sound
