= Gregor Salto =

Dutch DJ and record producer (born 1979)

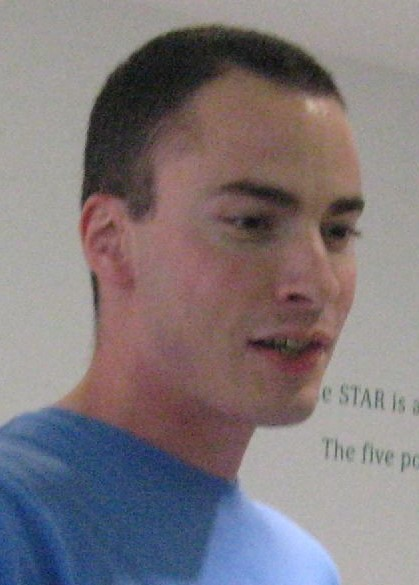
- Salto in 2008

Background information
- Born: Gregor van Offeren; 21 April 1979 (age 47); Haarlem, Netherlands
- Genres: House; Latin house; electro house; soul jazz; jungle terror; Dutch house; tribal house; future house
- Occupations: Musician; DJ; record producer
- Instruments: Piano; guitar; synthesizer
- Years active: 1994–present
- Labels: Doorn Records; G-Rex Music; Spinnin' Records; Mixmash Records
- Website: gregorsalto.com/

Gregor van Offeren (born 21 April 1979 in Haarlem, Netherlands), better known as Gregor Salto, is a Dutch DJ and record producer.

== Discography ==
=== Albums ===
- 2014: Gregor Salto Ultimate Miami 2 [G-REX Music]

=== EPs ===
- 2016: Para Você EP [SPRS]

=== Charting singles ===
Year	Title	Peak chart positions				Certifications	Album
Year	Title	NLD	BEL (Vl)	BEL (Wa)	UK	Certifications	Album
2005	"Can't Stop Playing" (with Dr. Kucho!)	16	33	2^{[B]}	—		Non-album singles
2005	"Looking Good" (featuring Red)	30	5^{[A]}	17^{[B]}	—		Non-album singles
2005	"Decision"	—	20^{[A]}	—	—		Non-album singles
2006	"Real People"	44	8^{[C]}	—	—		Non-album singles
2006	"Can't Stop Playing" (Remixes) (with Dr. Kucho!)	—	19^{[C]}	—	—		Non-album singles
2006	"Viajar"	44	—	—	—		Non-album singles
2007	"Toys Are Nuts!" (with Chuckie)	23	—	—	—		Non-album singles
2007	"What Do You Want Papi" (with Sidney Samson)	33	—	—	—		Non-album singles
2007	"Love Is My Game" (with Dr. Kucho!)	33	—	—	—		Non-album singles
2008	"Bouncing Harbour Remixes"	—	10^{[C]}	—	—		Non-album singles
2009	"Lambada 3000" (with Kaoma)	18	8^{[C]}	—	—		Non-album singles
2009	"Step by Step" (with Laidback Luke featuring Mavis Acquah)	65	—	—	—		Non-album singles
2010	"Your Friend" (featuring Chappell)	92	40^{[C]}	—	—		Non-album singles
2010	"I'll Be There" (with Afrojack featuring Jimbolee)	—	10^{[C]}	—	—		Non-album singles
2011	"We Get High" (featuring Chappell)	92	40	—	—		Non-album singles
2011	"Please Me" (with Florian T. featuring Chappell)	—	3^{[D]}	—	—		Non-album singles
2011	"Madalena" (featuring Chappell)	—	2^{[C]}	—	—		Non-album singles
2011	"What Happens in Vegas" (with Chuckie)	—	37^{[C]}	—	—		Non-album singles
2012	"Damelo (You Got What I Want)"	29^{[C]}	—	—	—		Non-album singles
2012	"Azumba"	—	76^{[A]}	—	—		Non-album singles
2014	"Samba Do Mundo" (Fatboy Slim pres. Gregor Salto featuring Saxsymbol and Todoro)	3^{[B]}	84^{[C]}	—	—		Non-album singles
2014	"Riddim Go" (with Dr. Kucho!)	—	20^{[D]}	12^{[D]}	—		Non-album singles
2014	"Can't Stop Playing" (Oliver Heldens and Gregor Salto Remix) (with Dr. Kucho!)	66	38	—	—		Non-album singles
2015	"Afrobot" (Wiwek Remix)	—	12^{[C]}	—	—		Non-album singles
2015	"Can't Stop Playing (Makes Me High)" (with Dr. Kucho! featuring Ane Brun)	—	17^{[A]}	37^{[B]}	4	BPI: Platinum	Non-album singles
"—" denotes a recording that did not chart or was not released in that territory.

=== Singles ===
- 2012: Danny [Wall Recordings]
- 2012: Azumba [Mixmash Records]
- 2012: Gimme Sum (with Chocolate Puma) [Pssst Music]
- 2013: Toys Are Nuts 2013 (with Chuckie) [G-REX Music]
- 2013: Foxy (with Funkin Matt) [Mixmash Records]
- 2013: Otro Dia [Moganga]
- 2013: Intimi (with Wiwek) [Mixmash Records]
- 2013: Drumology [LEDS]
- 2013: Samba Do Mundo (Fatboy Slim Presents Gregor Salto) [Decca (UMO)]
- 2014: Para Voce [G-REX Music]
- 2014: Rumble (featuring MC Spyder) [DOORN (Spinnin')]
- 2014: Girls Tipsy (with East & Young featuring MC Spyder) [Rimbu]
- 2015: On Your Mark (with Wiwek) [G-REX Music]
- 2015: Afrobot (Wiwek Remix) [DOORN (Spinnin')]
- 2015: Miami (with Wiwek) [DOORN (Spinnin')]
- 2015: Trouble (with Wiwek featuring MC Spyder) [DOORN (Spinnin')]
- 2015: Just Yeah (with Mitchell Niemeyer) [Spinnin' Deep]
- 2015: Love Is My Game (Remix) (with Dr. Kucho!, Lucas & Steve) [Spinnin' Deep]
- 2016: How It Goes (with Wiwek featuring Stush) [Spinnin' Records]
- 2016: Tribal (with Sander van Doorn) [DOORN (Spinnin')]
- 2017: PULA (with Roulsen featuring Dudu Capoeira) [Flamingo Recordings]
- 2017: Yala (featuring Teema) [Salto Sounds (Moganga)]
- 2017: Magalenha (with Simon Fava featuring Sergio Mendes) [SPRS]
- 2018: Brut Riddim (with Sidney Samson) [Salto Sounds (Moganga)]
- 2018: Fan Of Your Love (with Ruby Prophet) [SOURCE]
- 2018: So Hot (with Wiwek and Kuenta I Tambu featuring Spyder) [Spinnin' Records]
- 2019: Time [Spinnin' Records]
- 2019: Feeling Wet (with Nikisha Reyes) [G-REX Music]
- 2020: Jaleo (with Kenny Brian) [Salto Sounds]
- 2021: Child of the Rainbow (with BCUC) [Salto Sounds]
- 2021: Bangene (with BCUC) [Salto Sounds]

=== Remixes and edits ===
- 2012: Rihanna - Diamonds (Gregor Salto Remix Radio Edit) [Def Jam]
- 2012: Nicky Romero, NERVO - Like Home (Gregor Salto Remix) [Protocol Recordings]
- 2012: Shazalakazoo, Chernobyl, Suppa Fla - Zica Memo (Gregor Salto Remix) [Downpitch]
- 2012: Pitbull - Back In Time (Gregor Salto Remix)
- 2013: Shazalakazoo, Chernobyl, Zuzuka Poderosa - As Mulher (Gregor Salto Remix) [G-REX]
- 2013: Duck Sauce - It's You (Gregor Salto Remix) [3beat Records]
- 2014: Rita Ora - I Will Never Let You Down (Gregor Salto Vegas Club Mix) [Roc Nation]
- 2014: Dr. Kucho!, Gregor Salto - Can't Stop Playing (Oliver Heldens and Gregor Salto Remix) [Spinnin' Records]
- 2015: Major Lazer, Ellie Goulding, Tarrus Riley - Powerful (Gregor Salto Remix)
- 2015: Theo / Gabe Ramos - Samboodee (Gregor Salto Club Mix) [Nervous Records]
- 2016: Flo Rida, Sam Martin - Dirty Mind (Gregor Salto Remix) [Poe Boy/Atlantic]
- 2016: Cheat Codes, Kris Kross Amsterdam - Sex (Gregor Salto Remix) [Spinnin' Remixes]
- 2016: Tara McDonald - I Need a Miracle (Tara McDonald song) Europride anthem 2016 (Gregor Salto Remix)
- 2017: Iwan Esseboom - Wittie Visie (Gregor Salto Remix) [G-REX]
- 2017: Galantis, ROZES - Girls On Boys (Gregor Salto Remix) [Big Beat]
- 2018: Gregor Salto, Red - Looking Good (Steff Da Campo and Gregor Salto Remix) [SPRS]
- 2019: Gregor Salto – Azumba (Wiwek & Gregor Salto Remix) [Mixmash]
- 2019: Miguel O’Syrah & Gregor Salto feat. Thais – Mexer (Rework) [Salto Sounds]
- 2020: Andrew Mathers & Dudu Capoeira – Wheppa (Gregor Salto Remix) [Salto Sounds]
- 2021: Ultra Nate – Free (Live Your Life) (Ibitaly & Gregor Salto Remix) [Blufire]
- 2021: Timmy Thomas – Why Can't We Live Together (Gregor Salto & Ibitaly Remix) [High Fashion Music]
