= List of UK R&B Albums Chart number ones of 2015 =

The logo of the Official Charts Company, responsible for compiling all of the official music charts in the United Kingdom, including the R&B albums chart.

The UK R&B Chart is a weekly chart of the 40 biggest-selling singles and albums in the R&B genre in the United Kingdom. The chart is compiled by the Official Charts Company, and is based on sales of CDs, downloads, vinyl and other formats over the previous seven days. It was first introduced in October 1994.

The following are the number-one albums of 2015.

== Number-one albums ==
Issue date	Album	Artist(s)	Record label	Ref.
4 January	Love in the Future	John Legend	GOOD Music/Columbia	
11 January	2014 Forest Hills Drive	J. Cole	Dreamville/Roc Nation/Columbia	
18 January	Love in the Future	John Legend	GOOD Music/Columbia	
25 January	The Trevor Nelson Collection Volume 3	Various Artists	Sony	
1 February	The Trevor Nelson Collection Volume 3	Various Artists	Sony	
8 February	Full Speed	Kid Ink	RCA	
15 February	If You're Reading This It's Too Late	Drake	OVO Sound/Young Money/Cash Money	
22 February	If You're Reading This It's Too Late	Drake	OVO Sound/Young Money/Cash Money	
1 March	Fan of a Fan: The Album	Chris Brown & Tyga	RCA/Young Money/Cash Money	
8 March	Fan of a Fan: The Album	Chris Brown & Tyga	RCA/Young Money/Cash Money	
15 March	Love in the Future	John Legend	GOOD Music/Columbia	
22 March	To Pimp a Butterfly	Kendrick Lamar	To Dawg/Interscope/Aftermath	
29 March	To Pimp a Butterfly	Kendrick Lamar	To Dawg/Interscope/Aftermath	
5 April	To Pimp a Butterfly	Kendrick Lamar	To Dawg/Interscope/Aftermath	
12 April	Furious 7	Original Soundtrack	Atlantic	
19 April ^{[b]}	Furious 7	Original Soundtrack	Atlantic	
26 April ^{[b]}	Furious 7	Original Soundtrack	Atlantic	
3 May ^{[b]}	Furious 7	Original Soundtrack	Atlantic	
10 May	Integrity	Jme	Boy Better Know	
17 May ^{[b]}	Furious 7	Original Soundtrack	Atlantic	
24 May	Number 1 to Infinity	Mariah Carey	Epic/Columbia/Legacy	
31 May	At. Long. Last. ASAP	ASAP Rocky	RCA	
7 June	Everything Is 4	Jason Derulo	Beluga Heights/Atlantic	
14 June	Everything Is 4	Jason Derulo	Beluga Heights/Atlantic	
21 June	Furious 7	Original Soundtrack	Atlantic	
28 June	Coming Home	Leon Bridges	Columbia	
5 July	Throwback R&B	Various Artists	Ministry of Sound	
10 July	The Long Way Home	Krept and Konan	Play Dirty/Virgin EMI/Def Jam	
17 July	Throwback R&B	Various Artists	Ministry of Sound	
24 July	Throwback R&B	Various Artists	Ministry of Sound	
31 July	Throwback R&B	Various Artists	Ministry of Sound	
7 August	Throwback R&B	Various Artists	Ministry of Sound	
14 August	Compton	Dr. Dre	Interscope	
21 August	Compton	Dr. Dre	Interscope	
28 August	Compton	Dr. Dre	Interscope	
4 September ^{[a]} ^{[b]}	Beauty Behind the Madness	The Weeknd	Republic	
11 September ^{[b]}	Beauty Behind the Madness	The Weeknd	Republic	
18 September ^{[b]}	Beauty Behind the Madness	The Weeknd	Republic	
25 September	What a Time to be Alive	Future & Drake	Cash Money/Epic/A1	
2 October ^{[b]}	Beauty Behind the Madness	The Weeknd	Republic	
9 October	Beauty Behind the Madness	The Weeknd	Republic	
16 October	Rappers Delight	Various Artists	Ministry Of Sound/Sony Music	
23 October	Rappers Delight	Various Artists	Ministry Of Sound/Sony Music	
30 October	Rappers Delight	Various Artists	Ministry Of Sound/Sony Music	
6 November	Rappers Delight	Various Artists	Ministry Of Sound/Sony Music	
13 November	7	Seal	Warner	
20 November	Rappers Delight	Various Artists	Ministry Of Sound/Sony Music	
27 November	Rappers Delight	Various Artists	Ministry Of Sound/Sony Music	
4 December	Rappers Delight	Various Artists	Ministry Of Sound/Sony Music	
11 December	Rappers Delight	Various Artists	Ministry Of Sound/Sony Music	
18 December	Beauty Behind the Madness	The Weeknd	Republic	
25 December	Royalty	Chris Brown	RCA	

== Notes ==
- ^{a} - The album was simultaneously number-one on the UK albums chart.
- ^{b} - The artist was simultaneously number-one on the R&B singles chart.

== See also ==
- List of UK Albums Chart number ones of 2015
- List of UK R&B Singles Chart number ones of 2015
