= Dr. Kucho! =

Spanish record producer (born 1972)

- Also known as: Dr. Who!, Disk Doctor
- Born: Daniel Manzano Salazar; 4 December 1972 (age 53)
- Origin: Madrid, Spain
- Genre: House
- Occupations: Disc jockey, record producer
- Years active: 1992–present
- Label: Disco Doctor Records Spinnin'
- Website: drkucho.com

Daniel Manzano Salazar (born 4 December 1972), better known by his stage name Dr Kucho!, is a Spanish house DJ/record producer. He is best known for his 2005 single "Can't Stop Playing" with Gregor Salto. The song was re-released in 2014, remixed by Oliver Heldens and vocals from Ane Brun were added. The song then had success in the UK, reaching number 4 in the charts.

== Career ==
Dr. Kucho started in 2004 releasing “New School Tribal”, a tune with African roots and catchy chants that reached the number 26 of Beatport's house top downloads in just one week, maintaining this position and closers for weeks. It seems that Dr. Kucho has a special drive to start each new year full of energy, as he demonstrated in January 2009 when he released new remixes of “Patricia never leaves the house”, the tune that opened him the doors of UK market in 2001, this re-release with remixes from Dr. Kucho himself, Gregor Salto, Peter Gelderblom and Mike Haddad & Royce Haven was one of the best sellers at Beatport during the beginning of the 2009.

== Discography ==
=== Singles ===
Year	Title	Peak chart positions			Certifications	Album
Year	Title	BEL (Vl)	NL	UK	Certifications	Album
2004	"Belmondo Rulez 2.0 (It's All About You)" (featuring Jodie)	55	—	—		Non-album singles
2005	"Can't Stop Playing" (with Gregor Salto)	33	16	—		Non-album singles
2007	"Love Is My Game" (with Gregor Salto)	—	24	—		Non-album singles
2007	"Lies to Yourself"	—	30	—		Non-album singles
2009	"Holy Spirit"	—	—	—		Non-album singles
2009	"Groover's Delight"	—	—	—		Non-album singles
2009	"Just Be Good to Me"	—	—	—		Non-album singles
2010	"Funkatron"	—	—	—		Non-album singles
2010	"Funkatron"	—	—	—		Non-album singles
2010	"The Big Bang Theory/My Way"	—	—	—		Non-album singles
2010	"Lloraras" (vs. Mike Haddad & Royce Haven)	—	—	—		Non-album singles
2011	"Beyond The Rave" (vs. Jacobsen)	—	—	—		Non-album singles
2012	"To Russia with Love"	—	—	—		Non-album singles
2012	"Belmondo Rulez 4.0"	—	—	—		Non-album singles
2013	"The Whistle Song"	—	—	—		Non-album singles
2014	"Can't Stop Playing" (Oliver Heldens & Gregor Salto Remix) (with Gregor Salto)	38	66	—		Non-album singles
2015	"Can't Stop Playing (Makes Me High)" (with Gregor Salto featuring Ane Brun)	—	—	4	BPI: Platinum	Non-album singles
2015	"Love Is My Game" (vs. Gregor Salto vs. Lucas & Steve)	—	—	—		Non-album singles
"—" denotes a single that did not chart or was not released in that territory.
