= The Voice UK series 7 =

Seventh series of The Voice UK

The Voice UK
- Series 7
- Hosted by: Emma Willis; Jamie Miller (ITV Hub); Vick Hope (ITV Hub)
- Coaches: will.i.am; Jennifer Hudson; Sir Tom Jones; Olly Murs
- Winner: Ruti Olajugbagbe
- Winning mentor: Sir Tom Jones
- Runner-up: Donel Mangena
- No. of episodes: 14

Release
- Original network: ITV; ITV Hub (The V Room)
- Original release: 6 January – 7 April 2018

Series chronology
- ← Previous; Series 6 Next → Series 8

The Voice UK is a British television music competition to find new singing talent. The seventh series began airing on 6 January 2018 and concluded on 7 April 2018. It was presented by Emma Willis on ITV. will.i.am, Jennifer Hudson and Sir Tom Jones return for their seventh, second and sixth series, respectively, with Olly Murs replacing Gavin Rossdale as a new coach for the series. Previous runner-up Jamie Miller replaced Cel Spellman as the presenter of companion show, The V Room, broadcast through the ITV Hub.

== Coaches ==
Coaches for series 7 of The Voice UK

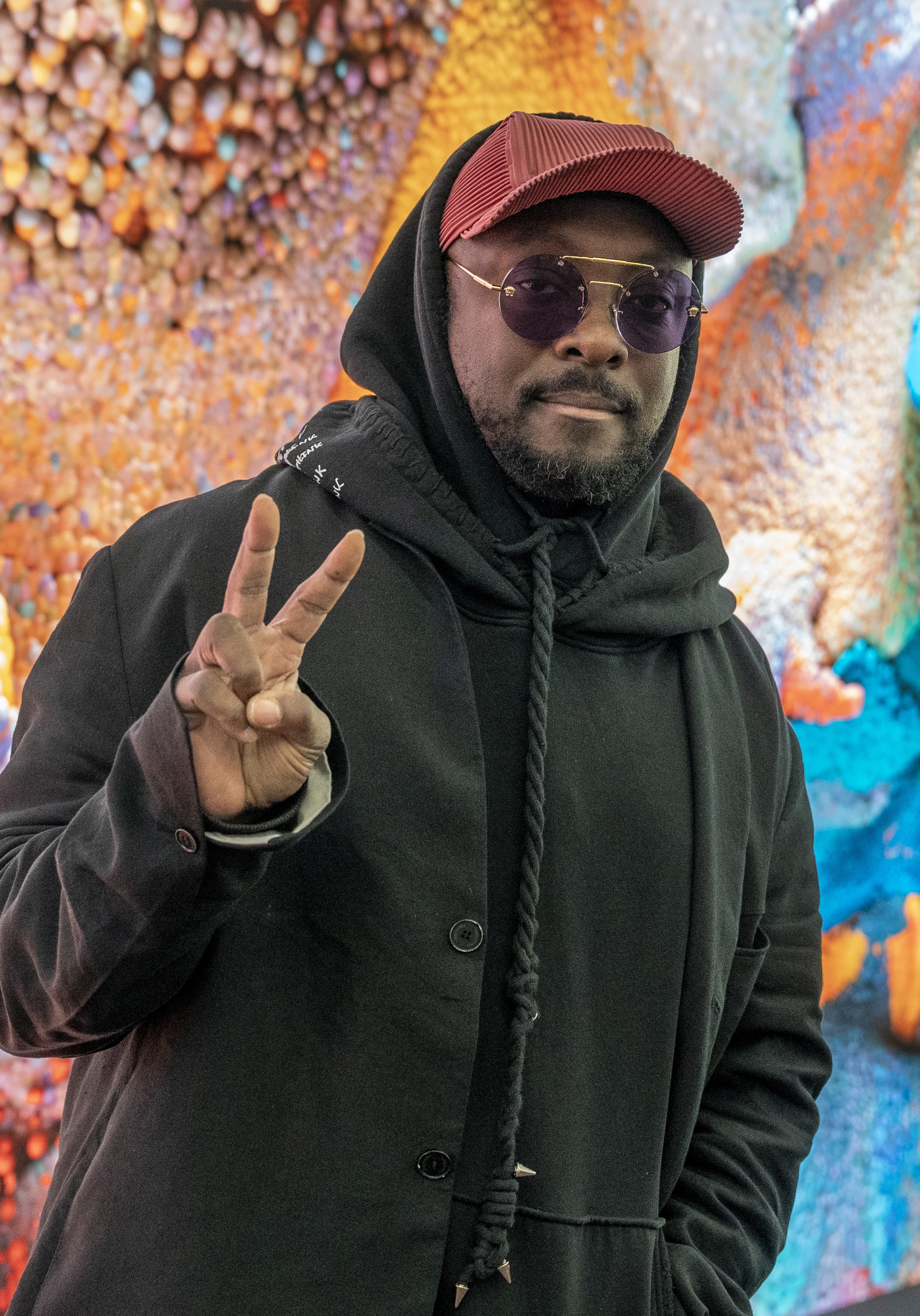
will.i.am

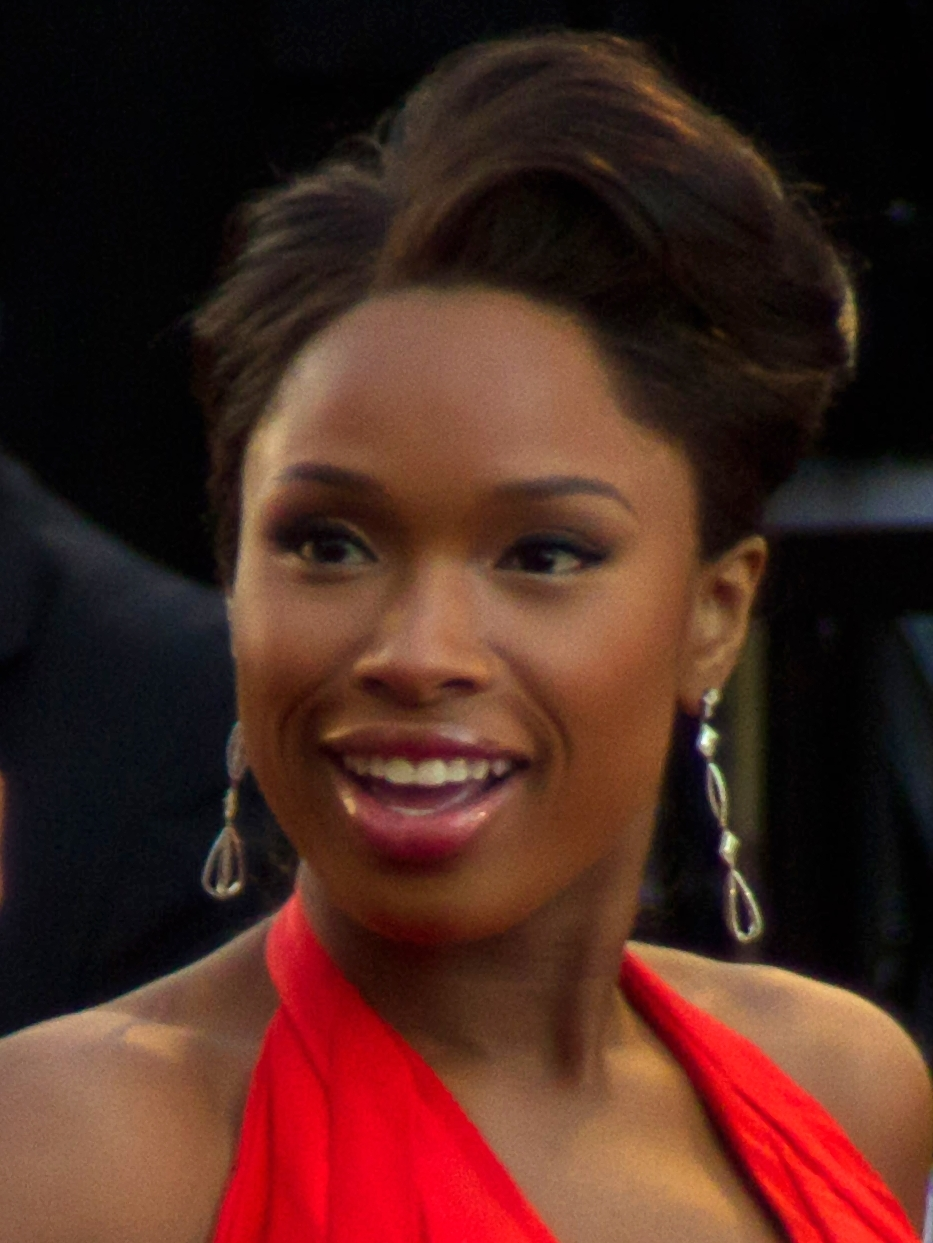
Jennifer Hudson

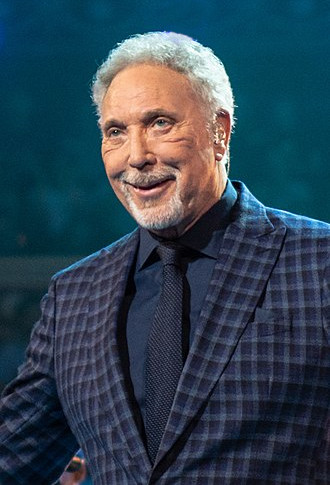
Sir Tom Jones

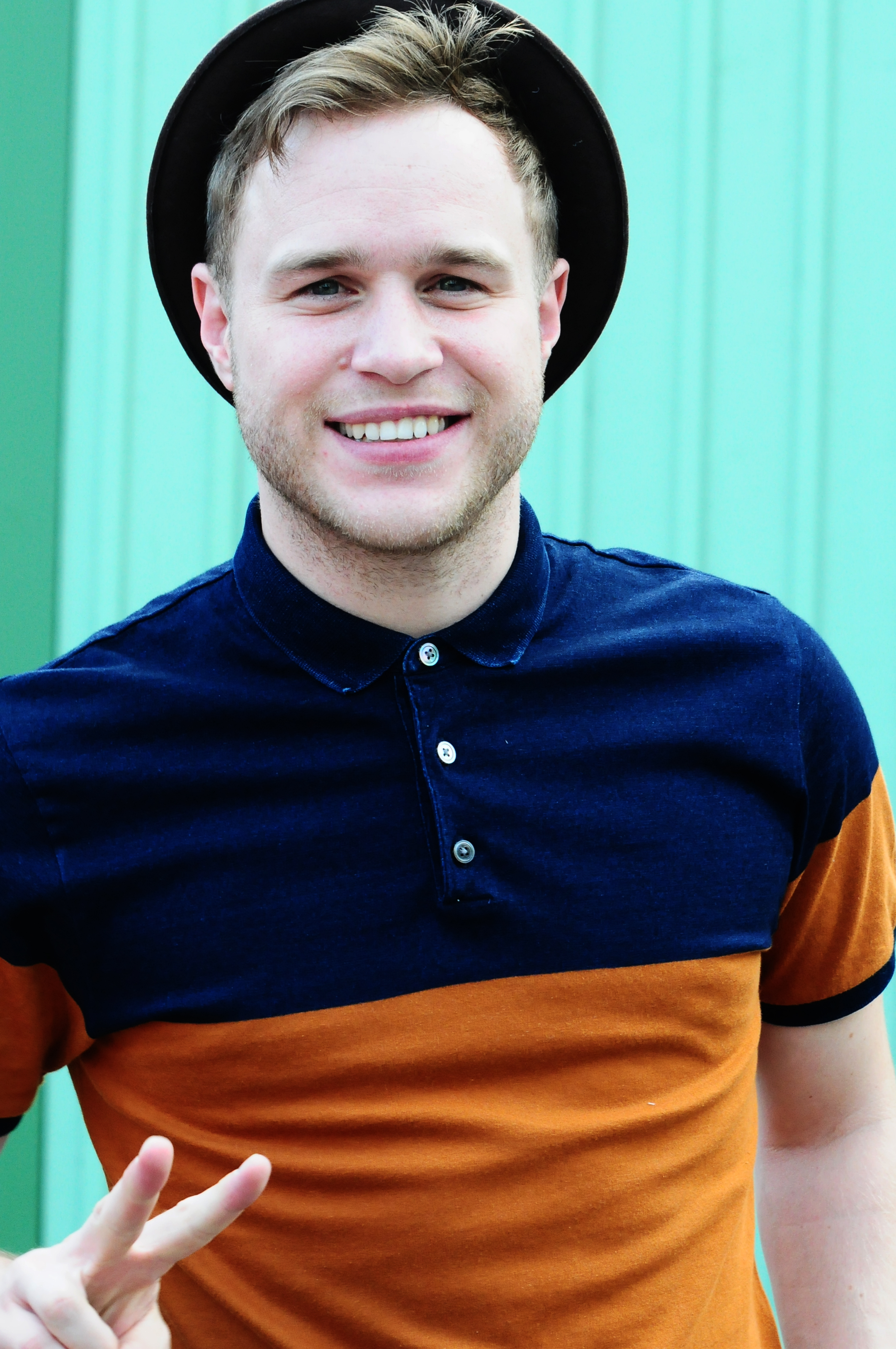
Olly Murs

On 6 March 2017, it was announced that will.i.am would be returning as a coach on the show for his seventh series, with ITV stating that they were in "all parties" to have Sir Tom Jones to return as a coach as well. After much speculation regarding his future on the programme, on 6 August 2017, Gavin Rossdale announced his departure from the programme, after just one series as a coach. Following this announcement, Danny Jones became the favourite to replace Rossdale, after impressing show producers in his performance on the junior spin-off programme The Voice UK, though former coach Ricky Wilson was also in the running, as he previously stated that the door would be left open for him to return to the show after his first departure in 2016. On 11 October 2017, Olly Murs was confirmed as Rossdale's replacement, after being linked with the position for many weeks, along with the news that Jennifer Hudson would be returning for her second series as a coach. Emma Willis will return for her second series as solo presenter, her fifth overall, with Jamie Miller replacing Cel Spellman as the presenter of companion show The V Room.

On 8 February 2018, it was announced that the coaches will have Guest Mentors to help them choose their acts in the Knockout stages and they are as follows: Craig David will help Olly Murs, Apl.de.ap and Taboo will help will.i.am, Kylie Minogue will help Sir Tom Jones and Mo Adeniran and Leona Lewis will help Jennifer Hudson.

It was announced on 12 March 2018, Vick Hope would be replacing Jamie Miller as the backstage presenter.

== Promotion ==
The first teaser trailer for the seventh series was released in December 2017, featuring coaches will.i.am, Hudson, Jones and Murs. The coaches were also interviewed by The V Room presenter Miller, at the red carpet for the blind auditions.

== Teams ==
Colour key:

- Winner
- Runner-up
- Third place
- Fourth place
- Eliminated in the Semi-Final
- Eliminated in the Knockouts
- Artist was stolen by another coach at the Battles
- Eliminated in the Battles

Coach	Top 40 Artists					
will.i.am						
will.i.am	Donel Mangena	Tai	Mark Asari	Saskia Eng	Paige Young	Anna Willison Holt
will.i.am	~~Chantelle Nandi~~	~~Rhianna Abrey~~	~~Kade Smith~~	Loaded Sista	Wesu Wallace	
Jennifer Hudson						
Jennifer Hudson	Belle Voci	Gayatri Nair	Rhianna Abrey	Jason Nicholson-Porter	Jake Benson	Ross Anderson
Jennifer Hudson	Ant & Ox	Tesni Jones	Harri Oakland	Jilly Riley	Scarlett Quigley	
Sir Tom Jones						
Sir Tom Jones	Ruti Olajugbagbe	Lucy Milburn	Chantelle Nandi	Wayne Ellington	Kalon Rae	Eliza Gutteridge
Sir Tom Jones	~~Saskia Eng~~	Jade Williams	Chloe Jones	Simon Davies	Courtney O'Neil	
Olly Murs						
Olly Murs	Lauren Bannon	Jamie Grey	Kirby Frost	Shane McCormack	Holly Ellison	Kade Smith
Olly Murs	Ivy Paige	Debbie Aramide	Bailey Nelsen	RYT	Chris James	

== Blind auditions ==
On 14 December 2017, it was announced by ITV that the seventh series would begin broadcasting on 6 January 2018.

Colour key

✔	Coach hit his/her "I WANT YOU" button
	Artist defaulted to this coach's team
	Artist elected to join this coach's team
	Artist eliminated with no coach pressing his or her "I WANT YOU" button
	Artist Received an "All Turn"

=== Episode 1 (6 January) ===
The series premiere aired from 8.00pm until 9.35pm.

- Group performance: The Voice UK coaches – "Feeling Good"

Order	Artist	Age	Song	Coaches and artists choices			
Order	Artist	Age	Song	will.i.am	JHud	Tom	Olly
1	Jake Benson	26	"Issues"	—	✔	✔	✔
2	Chloe Jones	22	"Like a Star"	✔	—	✔	✔
3	Lauren Bannon	27	"Lean On"	✔	✔	✔	✔
4	Niall Donnelly	35	"Good Riddance (Time of Your Life)"	—	—	—	—
5	Jimmy Balito	22	"Concrete"	—	—	—	—
6	Jason Nicholson-Porter	33	"Amazing Grace"	—	✔	—	—
7	RYT	24–30	"JCB"	—	✔	✔	✔
8	Donel Mangena	16	"Cold Water"	✔	✔	✔	✔

=== Episode 2 (13 January) ===
This episode aired from 8.00pm until 9.30pm.

- Performance: between Sir Tom Jones & Jennifer Hudson – "Whole Lotta Shakin' Goin' On"

Order	Artist	Age	Song	Coaches and artists choices			
Order	Artist	Age	Song	will.i.am	JHud	Tom	Olly
1	Kade Smith	16	"(Sittin' On) The Dock of the Bay"	✔	✔	✔	✔
2	Belle Voci	25–26	"Flower Duet"	—	✔	—	—
3	Ivy Paige	37	"Why Don't You Do Right?"	—	—	—	✔
4	Jade Williams	32	"Secret Smile"	—	—	✔	—
5	Jacob Simpson	21	"Over"	—	—	—	—
6	Jamie Grey	29	"Rise Up"	—	—	✔	✔
7	Benn Helm	43	"Always on the Run"	—	—	—	—
8	Lucy Milburn	20	"Colorblind"	✔	✔	✔	✔

=== Episode 3 (20 January) ===
This episode aired from 8.00pm until 9.30pm.

- Performance: from Olly Murs – "Dance with Me Tonight"

Order	Artist	Age	Song	Coaches and artists choices			
Order	Artist	Age	Song	will.i.am	JHud	Tom	Olly
1	Chris James	28	"Prince Ali"	—	—	—	✔
2	Tai	18	"Move On Up"	✔	—	✔	—
3	Gemma Kalmakrian	34	"Born to Be Wild"	—	—	—	—
4	Ruti Olajugbagbe	18	"Budapest"	—	—	✔	—
5	Ant & Ox	21	"Sunday Morning"	—	✔	✔	✔
6	Micky Cohen	24	"Despacito"	—	—	—	—
7	Janel Antoneshia	24	"Magic"	—	—	—	—
8	Mark Asari	28	"Walking Away”	✔	—	✔	—
9	Simon Davies	30	"Sign of the Times”	✔	✔	✔	✔

=== Episode 4 (27 January) ===
This episode aired from 8.00pm until 9.30pm.

Order	Artist	Age	Song	Coaches and artists choices			
Order	Artist	Age	Song	will.i.am	JHud	Tom	Olly
1	H Boss	28	"Don't Mind"/ "Antenna"	—	—	—	—
2	Kirby Frost	17	"Ciao Adios"	✔	—	✔	✔
3	Loaded Sista	30–34	"Black Widow"	✔	—	✔	✔
4	Anna Willison Holt	17	"Never Forget You"	✔	—	—	—
5	Eliza Gutteridge	16	"Wild Horses"	—	—	✔	—
6	Jordan James	25	"Don't Go"	—	—	—	—
7	Zak Archer	17	"Handbags and Gladrags"	—	—	—	—
8	Holly Ellison	23	"Sorry Not Sorry”	✔	—	—	✔
9	Gayatri Nair	16	"Powerful”	✔	✔	✔	—

=== Episode 5 (3 February) ===
This episode aired from 8.00pm until 9.30pm.

Order	Artist	Age	Song	Coaches and artists choices			
Order	Artist	Age	Song	will.i.am	JHud	Tom	Olly
1	Saskia Eng	16	"Strong"	—	—	✔	—
2	Faith	21	"Hold On"	—	—	—	—
3	Paige Young	25	"Crying in the Club"	✔	—	—	—
4	Shane McCormack	21	"Moondance"	—	—	—	✔
5	Rhianna Abrey	20	"Ghost"	✔	—	—	—
6	Ross Anderson	17	"Drag Me Down"	—	✔	—	—
7	Wendi Harriot	41	"(I Can't Get No) Satisfaction"	—	—	—	—
8	Ellis Bridgewater	25	"Big White Room”	—	—	—	—
9	Wayne Ellington	46	"We Were Raised Under Grey Skies”	—	✔	✔	—

=== Episode 6 (10 February) ===
This episode aired from 8.15pm until 9.45pm.

Order	Artist	Age	Song	Coaches and artists choices			
Order	Artist	Age	Song	will.i.am	JHud	Tom	Olly
1	Michael Harrison	30	"Last Request"	—	—	—	—
2	Bailey Nelsen	18	"There's Nothing Holdin' Me Back"	—	—	—	✔
3	Wesu Wallace	36	"I'm Not the Only One"	✔	—	—	—
4	Courtney O'Neil	21	"When You Say Nothing at All"	—	—	✔	—
5	Keilah Miller	21	"What's Up?"	—	—	—	—
6	Jilly Riley	35	"All Right Now"	—	✔	—	—
7	Jodie Knight	18	"Iris"	—	—	—	—
8	Jess Herring	20	"(You Make Me Feel Like) A Natural Woman”	—	—	—	—
9	Tesni Jones	32	"Highway to Hell”	—	✔	✔	—

=== Episode 7 (17 February) ===
This episode aired from 8.00pm until 9.30pm.

Order	Artist	Age	Song	Coaches and artists choices			
Order	Artist	Age	Song	will.i.am	JHud	Tom	Olly
1	Scarlett Quigley	20	"Wishing You Were Somehow Here Again"	✔	✔	✔	—
2	Maria Le Belle	34	"Ghetto Story"/ "Get Busy"	—	—	—	—
3	Chantelle Nandi	29	"Kiss Me"	✔	—	—	—
4	Sand & Stone	21–25	"I Will Wait"	Team full	—	—	—
5	Harri Oakland	19	"Say You Won't Let Go"	Team full	✔	—	—
6	Kalon Rae	30	"Only You"	Team full	Team full	✔	—
7	Lekenah Eccles	27	"No Scrubs"	Team full	Team full	Team full	—
8	Sammi J	29	"Fever”	Team full	Team full	Team full	—
9	Navi Chahal	20	"Frozen”	Team full	Team full	Team full	—
10	Aimee Fitzpatrick	22	"Wrecking Ball”	Team full	Team full	Team full	—
11	Debbie Aramide	29	"Love Is a Losing Game”	Team full	Team full	Team full	✔

== Battle rounds ==
Filming for the battles began in December 2017 at dock10, MediaCityUK, following the taping of the blind auditions. Each coach has only one steal. The first part of the battle rounds will be broadcast on 24 February 2018.

Colour key

✔	Coach hit his/her "I WANT YOU" button
	Artist won the Battle and advanced to the Knockouts
	Artist lost the Battle but was stolen by another coach and advances to the Knockouts
	Artist lost the Battle and was eliminated

Episode	Coach	Order	Winner	Song	Loser	'Steal' result			
Episode	Coach	Order	Winner	Song	Loser	will.i.am	JHud	Tom	Olly
Episode 1 (24 February)	Olly Murs	1	Holly Ellison	"I'd Do Anything for Love"	Chris James	—	—	—	—N/a
Episode 1 (24 February)	Tom Jones	2	Eliza Gutteridge	"Fight Song"	Courtney O'Neil	—	—	—N/a	—
Episode 1 (24 February)	will.i.am	3	Mark Asari	"Don't Let Go (Love)"	Loaded Sista	—N/a	—	—	—
Episode 1 (24 February)	will.i.am	4	Tai	"Stand by Me"	Kade Smith	—N/a	✔	✔	✔
Episode 1 (24 February)	Jennifer Hudson	5	Belle Voci	"Smells Like Teen Spirit"	Scarlett Quigley	—	—N/a	—	Team full
Episode 1 (24 February)	Tom Jones	6	Lucy Milburn	"Too Good at Goodbyes"	Simon Davies	—	—	—N/a	Team full
Episode 1 (24 February)	will.i.am	7	Donel Mangena	"Rain"	Rhianna Abrey	—N/a	✔	✔	Team full
Episode 2 (3 March)	will.i.am	1	Anna Willison Holt	"Teardrops"	Chantelle Nandi	—N/a	Team full	✔	Team full
Episode 2 (3 March)	Olly Murs	2	Jamie Grey	"Falling Slowly"	RYT	—	Team full	Team full	Team full
Episode 2 (3 March)	Jennifer Hudson	3	Jake Benson	"Every Breath You Take"	Jilly Riley	—	Team full	Team full	Team full
Episode 2 (3 March)	Jennifer Hudson	4	Ross Anderson	"September Song"	Harri Oakland	—	Team full	Team full	Team full
Episode 2 (3 March)	Tom Jones	5	Kalon Rae	"Vincent"	Chloe Jones	—	Team full	Team full	Team full
Episode 2 (3 March)	Olly Murs	6	Kirby Frost	"Friends"	Bailey Nelsen	—	Team full	Team full	Team full
Episode 2 (3 March)	Jennifer Hudson	7	Jason Nicholson-Porter	"Let It Be"	Tesni Jones	—	Team full	Team full	Team full
Episode 3 (10 March)	Tom Jones	1	Ruti Olajugbagbe	"Dog Days Are Over"	Saskia Eng	✔	Team full	Team full	Team full
Episode 3 (10 March)	Olly Murs	2	Lauren Bannon	"Praise You"	Debbie Aramide	Team full	Team full	Team full	Team full
Episode 3 (10 March)	Jennifer Hudson	3	Gayatri Nair	"Skin"	Ant & Ox	Team full	Team full	Team full	Team full
Episode 3 (10 March)	Olly Murs	4	Shane McCormack	"Sway"	Ivy Paige	Team full	Team full	Team full	Team full
Episode 3 (10 March)	will.i.am	5	Paige Young	"Faith"	Wesu Wallace	Team full	Team full	Team full	Team full
Episode 3 (10 March)	Tom Jones	6	Wayne Ellington	"What About Us"	Jade Williams	Team full	Team full	Team full	Team full

== Knockouts ==
Filming for the show was on 10–11 March 2018 at Elstree Studios (Shenley Road). The first part of the knockout rounds was broadcast on 17 March 2018. In this round the mentors helped at the piano rehearsals.

Colour key:

Artist won the Knockouts and advanced to the Live shows
Artist lost the Knockouts and was eliminated

Episode	Coach	Order	Song	Artists		Song
Episode	Coach	Order	Song	Winner	Losers	Song
Episode 1 (17 March)	Olly Murs	1	"Believer"	Lauren Bannon	Kade Smith	"Express Yourself"
Episode 1 (17 March)	Olly Murs	1	"Believer"	Lauren Bannon	Holly Ellison	"Perfect"
Episode 1 (17 March)	will.i.am	2	"Jolene"	Tai	Paige Young	"Power"
Episode 1 (17 March)	will.i.am	2	"Jolene"	Tai	Anna Willison Holt	"Master Blaster (Jammin')"
Episode 1 (17 March)	Jennifer Hudson	3	"This Is Me"	Gayatri Nair	Jake Benson	"Sun Comes Up"
Episode 1 (17 March)	Jennifer Hudson	3	"This Is Me"	Gayatri Nair	Ross Anderson	"Torn"
Episode 1 (17 March)	Tom Jones	4	"Gravity"	Lucy Milburn	Kalon Rae	"California Dreamin'"
Episode 1 (17 March)	Tom Jones	4	"Gravity"	Lucy Milburn	Eliza Gutteridge	"Don't Kill My Vibe"
Episode 2 (24 March)	will.i.am	1	"Finesse"	Donel Mangena	Saskia Eng	"Came Here for Love"
Episode 2 (24 March)	will.i.am	1	"Finesse"	Donel Mangena	Mark Asari	"Don't Dream It's Over"
Episode 2 (24 March)	Tom Jones	2	"Dreams"	Ruti Olajugbagbe	Chantelle Nandi	"Sing It Back"
Episode 2 (24 March)	Tom Jones	2	"Dreams"	Ruti Olajugbagbe	Wayne Ellington	"Man in the Mirror"
Episode 2 (24 March)	Jennifer Hudson	3	"Nella Fantasia"	Belle Voci	Rhianna Abrey	"Anywhere"
Episode 2 (24 March)	Jennifer Hudson	3	"Nella Fantasia"	Belle Voci	Jason Nicholson-Porter	"When You Believe"
Episode 2 (24 March)	Olly Murs	4	"Faith"	Jamie Grey	Kirby Frost	"Crazy"
Episode 2 (24 March)	Olly Murs	4	"Faith"	Jamie Grey	Shane McCormack	"City of Stars"

== Live shows ==
The live shows began on 31 March 2018.

=== Results summary ===
Team's colour key
Team Will
Team JHud
Team Tom
Team Olly

Result's colour key
Artist received the fewest votes and was eliminated
Artist won the competition

Weekly results per artist
Contestant	Week 1	Week 2	
Contestant	Week 1	Round 1	Round 2
Ruti Olajugbagbe	2nd 22.91%	2nd 29.41%	Winner; 58.34%
Donel Mangena	1st 27.25%	1st 29.58%	Runner-up; 41.66%
Belle Voci	3rd 14.95%	3rd 24.27%	Eliminated (Week 2)
Lauren Bannon	4th 11.65%	4th 16.73%	Eliminated (Week 2)
Jamie Grey	5th 8.79%	Eliminated (Week 1)	
Gayatri Nair	6th 6.67%	Eliminated (Week 1)	
Lucy Milburn	7th 5.27%	Eliminated (Week 1)	
Tai	8th 2.49%	Eliminated (Week 1)	

==== Week 1: Semi-final (31 March) ====
This episode aired from 8.30pm to 10:00pm.

- Musical guest: Mo Jamil ("That Feeling")

Order	Coach	Artist	Song	Result
1	Olly Murs	Jamie Grey	"Say Something"	Eliminated
2	Tom Jones	Lucy Milburn	"One Last Time"	Eliminated
3	will.i.am	Tai	"When Doves Cry"	Eliminated
4	Jennifer Hudson	Gayatri Nair	"Alive"	Eliminated
5	Jennifer Hudson	Belle Voci	"Skyfall"	Advanced
6	Tom Jones	Ruti Olajugbagbe	"Waiting for a Star to Fall"	Advanced
7	will.i.am	Donel Mangena	"Happy"	Advanced
8	Olly Murs	Lauren Bannon	"In the Air Tonight"	Advanced

==== Week 2: Final (7 April) ====
This episode aired from 8:30pm to 10:10pm.

Group performance: The Voice UK coaches – "Come Together"

Order	Coach	Artist	First song	Order	Duet (with Coach)	Order	Winners single	Result
1	will.i.am	Donel Mangena	"Let Me Love You"	7	"OMG"	9	"Cold Water"	Runner-up
2	Jennifer Hudson	Belle Voci	"O Fortuna"	5	"My Heart Will Go On"	N/A	N/A (already eliminated)	3rd Place
3	Tom Jones	Ruti Olajugbagbe	"If You're Not the One"	8	"What a Wonderful World"	10	"Dreams"	Winner
4	Olly Murs	Lauren Bannon	"Stay"	6	"Ain't No Mountain High Enough"	N/A	N/A (already eliminated)	4th Place

== Reception ==
=== Ratings ===
Official ratings are taken from BARB.

Episode	Date	Official ratings	ITV weekly rank
Blind auditions 1	6 January	6.50	16
Blind auditions 2	13 January	6.60	15
Blind auditions 3	20 January	6.76	15
Blind auditions 4	27 January	6.24	15
Blind auditions 5	3 February	6.20	14
Blind auditions 6	10 February	6.37	14
Blind auditions 7	17 February	5.87	17
Battle rounds 1	24 February	6.56	13
Battle rounds 2	3 March	6.08	14
Battle rounds 3	10 March	5.71	16
Knockout rounds 1	17 March	5.70	16
Knockout rounds 2	24 March	4.76	16
Live Semi-Final	31 March	5.40	17
Live Final	7 April	5.87	14
