= Craig Ward =

Craig Ward may refer to:

- Craig Ward, British singer in The Voice UK (series 6)
- Craig Ward (musician) in Deus (band), Belgian band
