= Callum Scott Howells =

Welsh actor

- Born: 29 April 1999 (age 27); Pontypridd, Wales
- Education: Royal Welsh College of Music & Drama
- Occupation: Actor
- Years active: 2011–present

Callum Scott Howells (born 29 April 1999) is a Welsh British actor and singer. He began his career in theatre. For his performance in the Channel 4 drama It's a Sin (2021), he won a BAFTA Cymru and earned a British Academy Television Award nomination among other accolades. His films include Madfabulous (2026).

== Early life and education ==
Howells was born in Pontypridd in Wales, to parents Alison and Keith. He grew up nearby in Tonyrefail and Porth. His grandfather, Bryn Howells, was a life member of the Treorchy Male Choir.

Callum attended Treorchy Comprehensive School, where he was Head Boy. He took classes with Rhondda Stage School, Superstars in the Making in Barry, and was a member of the National Youth Music Theatre. He was scouted by an agent when he was 16 and went on to train at the Royal Welsh College of Music & Drama, graduating in 2020.

== Career ==
=== Early work (2011–2019) ===
Howells made his debut in a regional production of Oliver! He was a founding member of the boys' choir Only Boys Aloud, performing with them on series 6 of Britain's Got Talent in 2012 and later for Prince Harry and Meghan in 2018. He has since become a youth ambassador.

He appeared in series 2 of the CBBC reality documentary series Show Me What You're Made Of. He was 13 at the time. He later returned as a guest presenter. He worked as a Royal Correspondent on the CBBC series Blue Peter.

Howells won the 2013 Star of the Stage talent show. In 2014 he played Godfrey in Matthew Bourne's New Adventures production of Lord of the Flies at the Wales Millennium Centre. He performed with Treorchy Male Choir in 2015, Pendyrus Male Choir in 2017, and Dunvant Male Choir in 2018.

When he was 17 Howells auditioned for the singing competition Let It Shine with the song "You'll Be Back" from Hamilton. He was part of Group 4 and made it to the final 25. However, he pulled out to make time to play Arpad Laszlo in the West End production of She Loves Me at Menier Chocolate Factory.

In May 2016, he played the lead role in Blackout, a production in the nationwide "Connections" programme of the National Theatre. The first public review of his acting was headed "Actor to Watch" and read "Callum Scott Howells delivers a performance of ferocious impact."

In March 2019 he appeared at the Other Room Theatre in Cardiff in CRAVE by Sarah Kane.

=== Breakthrough (2021–present) ===
In October 2019 it was announced Howells would star in Russell T Davies' miniseries It's a Sin as Colin Morris-Jones. The character is loosely based on a real-life past boyfriend of Davies. The series premiered in January 2021 on Channel 4 and February on HBO Max. For his performance, Howells was nominated for the British Academy Television Award for Best Supporting Actor.

From 3 October 2022 to 28 January 2023, Howells played The Emcee in the West End production of Cabaret at the Kit Kat Club opposite Madeline Brewer as Sally Bowles at the Playhouse Theatre. On New Year's Eve 2022 he appeared in a vignette from the show on BBC 1's The Graham Norton Show.

Howells had been cast to play in Gary Owen's play Romeo and Julie for the Royal National Theatre in 2020. Due to the COVID-19 pandemic, however, the co-production with the Sherman Theatre was postponed and instead opened at the Dorfman Theatre in February 2023. The Times described Howells in the Romeo role as: "an entertaining, unsentimental, smartly judged performance."

In May 2023 it was announced that Howells had been cast as the Frankie Goes to Hollywood singer Holly Johnson in a biographical film Relax, and in Michael Sheen's series The Way for BBC One.

In May 2024, it was announced that he had been cast in the lead role in Madfabulous, a biopic movie based on the life of the flamboyant British aristocrat Henry Paget, 5th Marquess of Anglesey.

== Personal life ==
Howells describes himself using the word 'queer'.

In 2021, he voiced his support for Welsh independence from the United Kingdom, but in 2023 clarified his position, saying "I'm more in the curious category than being absolutely for it." He was critical of the Westminster government, but expressed the view that independence was "really far away from happening".

== Filmography ==
=== Film ===
Year	Title	Role	Notes
2024	The Beautiful Game	Nathan	Netflix film
2026	Madfabulous	Henry Paget, 5th Marquess of Anglesey	
2026	The State of Us	Taylor	
TBA	Relax	Holly Johnson	
TBA	Uncle	Tommy	

=== Television ===
Year	Title	Role	Notes
2012	Show Me What You're Made Of	Himself	
2017	Let It Shine	Contestant	
2021	It's a Sin	Colin Morris-Jones	Main role
2022	Lloyd of the Flies	Berry	Voice role
2024	The Way	Owen Driscoll	Main role
TBA	Deadpoint	Aaron	Filming

=== Music videos ===
Year	Title	Artist	Notes
2026	"Joke About Divorce"	Blossoms	
2026	"Meet Me In Love"	Blossoms	
2026	"Husband"	Blossoms	

== Stage ==
Year	Title	Role	Notes
2011–2012	Oliver!	Ensemble	Wales Millennium Centre, Cardiff; UK tour
2014	Lord of the Flies	Godfrey	Wales Millennium Centre, Cardiff
2015	Prodigy	Dan Davies	St James Theatre, London
2016	Blackout	James	Aberystwyth Arts Centre, Aberystwyth
2016	Brass	George	Hackney Empire, London
2016–2017	She Loves Me	Arpad Laszlo	Menier Chocolate Factory, London
2017	Tickledom	Basil	Welsh tour
2019	CRAVE	A	The Other Room, Cardiff
2022	Cabaret	The Emcee	Kit Kat Club at the Playhouse Theatre
2023	Romeo and Julie	Romeo	Dorfman Theatre, London and Sherman Theatre, Cardiff
2024	A View from the Bridge	Rodolpho	Theatre Royal Haymarket, London and Theatre Royal Bath, Bath
2024	White Rabbit Red Rabbit	Lead role	Soho Theatre, London; one-off performance in the evening show on 19 October as part of a rotating cast.
2025	Ghosts	Oz	Lyric Hammersmith, London; adaptation written by Gary Owen.
2027	Amadeus	Mozart	New Theatre, Cardiff and Noël Coward Theatre, London

== Awards and nominations ==
Year	Awards	Category	Work	Result	Ref
2021	BAFTA Cymru	Actor	It's a Sin	Won	
2022	BPG Awards	Best Actor	It's a Sin	Nominated	
2022	BPG Awards	Breakthrough Award (Note: Shared.)	It's a Sin	Nominated	
2022	RTS Programme Awards	Actor (Male)	It's a Sin	Won	
2022	RTS Programme Awards	Breakthrough Award	It's a Sin	Nominated	
2022	British Academy Television Awards	Best Supporting Actor	It's a Sin	Nominated	
2024	National Film Awards	Best Supporting Actor	The Beautiful Game	Nominated	
