= Seamus O'Hara =

Actor from Northern Ireland (born 1990)

- Born: 25 June 1990 (age 36); Ballymena, Northern Ireland
- Occupation: Actor
- Years active: 2012–present
- Known for: An Irish Goodbye
- Spouse: Mary Ellen O'Hara
- Children: 2

Seamus O'Hara (born 25 June 1990) is an actor from Northern Ireland.

== Early life ==
Born in Waveney Hospital, Ballymena, he grew up in County Antrim. His father Stephen was a teacher and restaurateur in Cushendall. He attended school at St Ciaran's Primary School in Cushendun. He was also educated at Garron Tower and Queen's University Belfast where he read English and Drama. He played juvenile hurling up to minor level with the Glens of Antrim combined team, St Patrick's, and played for Cushendun's Robert Emmets GAC.

== Career ==
He began his acting career with a role in the BBC NI student drama 6Degrees. His television credits include Game of Thrones as well as Hope Street and Line of Duty. His film credits include The Northman and Dungeons & Dragons: Honor Among Thieves.

He had a leading role as Turlough in the 2022 short film An Irish Goodbye, alongside James Martin, as two estranged brothers brought together by their mother’s death. The film won the Academy Award for Best Live Action Short Film at the 2023 Academy Awards and the BAFTA Award for Best Short Film at the 2023 British Academy Film Awards.

In February 2023, he had a lead role in the play Silent Trade at the Lyric Theatre in Belfast. He also had a role in 2023 Liam Neeson film In the Land of Saints and Sinners.

He portrays Lee Thompson in BBC One's Northern Ireland police drama Blue Lights.

== Personal life ==
In 2023, he lived near Newry with his wife Mary Ellen and their children, Henry and Eileen. He is a hurling coach at Killeavey GAC.

== Filmography ==
=== Film ===
Year	Title	Role	Notes
2017	Zoo	Soldier at Zoo Gate	
2022	Mandrake	Thomas	
2022	An Irish Goodbye	Turlough	Short film
2022	The Northman	Audunn the Irish	
2023	Dungeons & Dragons: Honor Among Thieves	Presto	
2023	In the Land of Saints and Sinners	Seamus McKenna	
2026	The State of Us	Frank	

=== Television ===
Year	Title	Role	Notes
2012–2015	6Degrees	Gary Meadows	Series 1–3
2016	My Mother and Other Strangers	Davey Hanlon	4 episodes
2017	Line of Duty	Arresting officer	Episode: "In the Shadow of the Truth"
2018	Agatha and the Truth of Murder	PC Spencer	Television film
2019	Game of Thrones	Fergus	Episodes: "A Knight of the Seven Kingdoms" and "The Long Night"
2022	Hope Street	Eddie McNulty	Episode #1.7
2023	Shadow and Bone	Sergent Haslov	Episode: "No Shelter But Me"
2024-	Blue Lights	Lee Thompson	Series 2–4
2024	Say Nothing	Mackers	6 episodes
2025	Sherlock & Daughter	O'Leary	Episode: "For Kith and Kin"
2025	House of Guinness	Patrick Cochrane	
