= The State of Us (film) =

British comedy drama film

- Directed by: Jake Harvey; Ollie Gardner
- Screenplay by: Jake Harvey
- Produced by: Pippa Cross; Dylan Rees; Jake Harvey
- Starring: Samuel Bottomley; Callum Scott Howells
- Cinematography: Yunus Roy Imer
- Edited by: Chris Gill; Abi Wright
- Music by: Tom Ogden
- Production companies: Restless Pictures; Crossday Productions; 4 8 Fourteen Films; Circus Studios
- Distributed by: Vertigo Releasing
- Release date: August 14, 2026 (Edinburgh)
- Running time: 90 minutes
- Country: United Kingdom
- Language: English

The State of Us is a 2026 British comedy drama film. It is the feature directorial debut of Jake Harvey and Ollie Gardner, based on a script by Harvey. It is starring Samuel Bottomley and Callum Scott Howells.

The film premiered at the 2026 Edinburgh International Film Festival.

== Premise ==
A young man collects his friend from hospice care for a final night of fun in Yorkshire.

== Cast ==
- Samuel Bottomley as Frankie
- Callum Scott Howells as Taylor
- Safia Oakley-Green as Rosie
- Seamus O'Hara as Frank
- Frances Barber as Joan
- Duggal Ram as Ishmael
- Sunetra Sarker

== Production ==
The film is the feature-length directorial debut of Jake Harvey and Ollie Gardner from a script by Harvey. The film is produced by Pippa Cross, Dylan Rees and Harvey, and is produced by Restless Pictures and Crossday Productions in association with 4 8 Fourteen Films and Circus Studios. Gardner and Harvey had previously made short film together, and having met while playing rugby at University, wanted to make a film about "positive masculinity" with elements of the script loosely based on Harvey's experiences of a childhood friend who died of cancer, for whom a dedication is made at the end of the film. Harvey told The Hollywood Reporter that "it’s not totally based on that person. His outlook on life [is what] I would say it’s based on". The film was in development for five years and Harvey began writing the screenplay when looking after his grandmother, whom the character Joan is partly based on, during the COVID-19 lockdown.

The cast is led by Samuel Bottomley and Callum Scott Howells and also includes Safia Oakley-Green, Seamus O'Hara, Sunetra Sarker, Duggal Ram and Frances Barber.

Principal photography took place in Bradford, Yorkshire and was shot in twelve days. The film features original music composed by Tom Ogden, frontman of the band Blossoms.

== Release ==
The film had its world premiere in the main competition at the 2026 Edinburgh International Film Festival. It will have a UK theatrical release through Vertigo Releasing.

== Reception ==
Jonathan Romney for Screen Daily described the film as a "boisterous, sometimes spikily amusing and, in the end, somewhat dewy-eyed" and praised the rapport between the two leads for being "natural and tender, with a nice rhythmic bounce” and also praised the performances of Oakley-Green and Barber, but felt that the screenplay played on sentimentality too much in the final third, and was "casual about following up (or not) its narrative threads".

Guy Lodge for Variety described it as a "winningly sweet-natured buddy comedy". Despite some "cliché" and "Hollywoodized sentimentality and narrative contrivance" Lodge felt that the film is "consistently likable, thanks in large part to lively performances by Howells and especially Bottomley".
