= Ruti Olajugbagbe =

English singer-songwriter (born 1999)

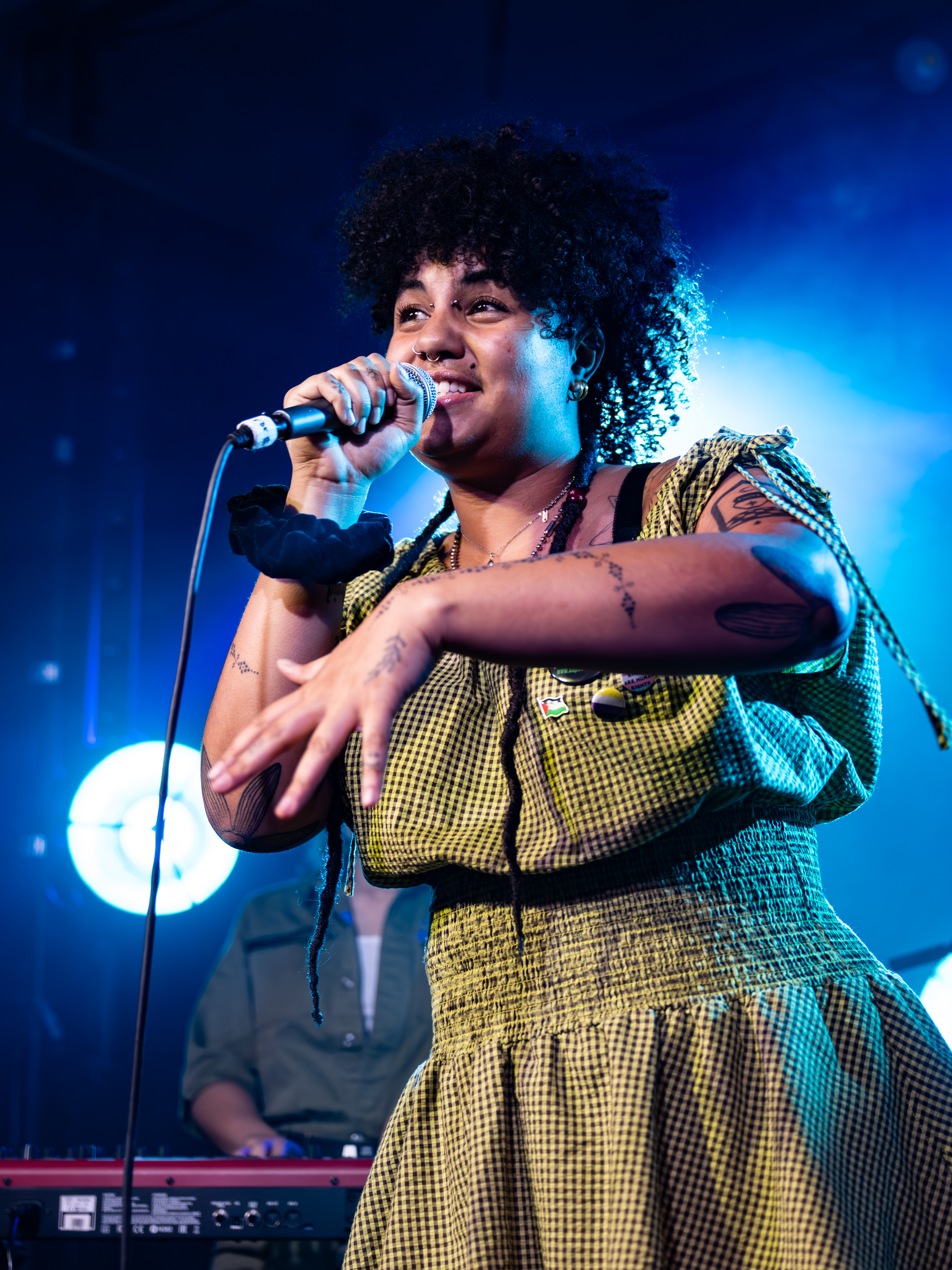
- Ruti at SXSW London, June 2025

Background information
- Born: 20 September 1999 (age 27); Thurrock, Essex, England
- Genre: Pop Jazz Folk
- Occupation: Singer-songwriter
- Instruments: Vocals
- Years active: 2018–present
- Labels: Polydor (2018–2019); Big Family Music (2021 - Present )

Ruti Olajugbagbe, known professionally as Ruti, (born 20 September 1999) is an English singer-songwriter. After winning the seventh series of The Voice UK, they (Note: Ruti uses they/them pronouns.) released their debut EP Racing Cars in 2019. Since then, Ruti has had numerous successful releases, including their 2024 single, "Lungs."

== Career ==
=== 2018: The Voice UK ===
In 2018, Olajugbagbe auditioned for The Voice UK, and joined Sir Tom Jones's team. After winning the series, their winner's single "Dreams", a cover of the Cranberries song, reached number 1 on the UK iTunes Store, and debuted at number 14 on the UK Singles Chart.

==== Performances ====
Performed	Song	Original artist	Result
Blind Audition	"Budapest"	George Ezra	Joined team Tom by default
Battle Rounds	"Dog Days Are Over" (against Saskia Eng)	Florence and the Machine	Won advanced to the knockouts
Knockout rounds	"Dreams"	The Cranberries	Saved by Coach
Semi-final	"Waiting for a Star to Fall"	Boy Meets Girl	Safe
Live final	"If You're Not the One"	Daniel Bedingfield	Winner
Live final	"What a Wonderful World" (with Tom Jones)	Louis Armstrong	Winner
Live final	"Dreams"	The Cranberries	Winner

=== 2019: Racing Cars ===
On 5 April 2019, Olajugbagbe released their debut extended play, Racing Cars, through Polydor. They returned to the final of the eighth series of The Voice to perform the lead single, "Racing Cars". Following the release of the EP, Olajugbagbe announced that they had been dropped from Polydor.

=== 2021: New Record Deal ===
In September 2021, Olajugbagbe said that they had signed a Publishing deal with Sony Music Publishing. Two months later in November 2021, Olajugbagbe also announced on their Instagram Page that they had signed a new record deal with PMR Records, part of the Universal Music Group.

== Personal life ==
Olajugbagbe is non-binary.

== Discography ==
=== Extended plays ===
List of extended plays, with selected details
Title	Details
Racing Cars	Released: 5 April 2019; Label: Polydor; Format: Digital download
All at Once	Released: 9 April 2021; Label: Ruti Sounds; Format: Digital download
MixTea_MilkTape!	Released: 9 June 2023; Label: PMR Records; Format: Digital download
Lungs	Released: 24 May 2024; Label: PMR Records; Format: Digital download
Maybe I Got it Wrong	Released: 7 November 2025; Label: Big Family Music; Format: Digital download

=== Singles ===
==== As solo artist ====
List of singles, with selected details and chart positions
Title	Year	Peak chart positions		Album
Title	Year	UK	SCO	Album
"Dreams"	2018	14	2	Non-album single
"Racing Cars"	2019	49	5	Racing Cars
"Closer to You"	2020	—	—	All at Once
"My Sunrise"	2021	—	—	All at Once
"Stand Tall" (with DJ Zinc & DRS)	2021	—	—	Non-album singles
"Safe & Sound"	2022	—	—	Non-album singles
"So Much More"	2023	—	—	MixTea_MilkTape!
"Luh Luh Love"	2023	—	—	MixTea_MilkTape!
"Nothing's Easy"	2023	—	—	MixTea_MilkTape!
"Bubblehouse Bounce (move as one)"	2024	—	—	Lungs
"Don't Make a Sound"	2024	—	—	Lungs
"Lungs"	2024	—	—	Lungs
"Break My Own Heart"	2024	—	—	Non-album singles
"Maybe I Got It Wrong"	2025	—	—	Maybe I Got It Wrong
"If I Could Choose It Would Be You"	2025	—	—	Maybe I Got It Wrong
"See Through"	2025	—	—	Maybe I Got It Wrong
"I'll Be Your Friend"	2026	—	—	TBA
"Flowers"	2026	—	—	TBA
"—" denotes a recording that did not chart or was not released in that territory.

==== As featured artist ====
List of singles, with selected details and chart positions
Title	Year	Peak chart positions	Album
Title	Year	UK	Album
"Lovely Day" (Billy Ocean & the Young Voices Choir featuring YolanDa Brown & Ruti)	2021	—	Non-album singles
"You Move Backwards" (Bad Sounds featuring Ruti)	2021	—	Non-album singles
"Train" (Show Dem Camp featuring The Cavemen., Ruti and Nsikak David)	2024	—	No Love in Lagos
"Shaken to My Soul" (Girls of the Internet featuring Ruti)	2024	—	When I Was Lost, I Found Myself
"When You Start" (Khushi featuring Ruti)	2025	—	Love Songs & Other Lies
"Oratores" (Vladimir Cauchemar and Apashe featuring Ruti)	2025	—	Oratores, Bellatores, Laboratores
"—" denotes a recording that did not chart or was not released.
