= Deadpoint =

British television series

- Genre: Thriller
- Written by: Matt Hartley
- Directed by: Marco Kreuzpaintner; Laura Scrivano
- Starring: Callum Scott Howells; Michael Socha; Christine Tremarco; Annes Elwy
- Country of origin: United Kingdom
- Original language: English
- No. of series: 1

Production
- Executive producers: Andy Baker; Charlie Langdell; Wim de Greef; Petra Fried; Matt Hartley; Marco Kreuzpaintner
- Producer: Adam Knopf
- Production company: Clerkenwell Films

Original release
- Network: Channel 4

Deadpoint is an upcoming British drama television series made for Channel 4 by Clerkenwell Films, set in Wales. The cast is led by Callum Scott Howells, Michael Socha and Christine Tremarco.

== Premise ==
A man is searching for his missing sister in Snowdonia (Eryri) national park at the same time as a far-right group, Justice Crusade, are preparing for a mission in the area.

== Cast ==
- Callum Scott Howells as Aaron
- Michael Socha as Fairweather
- Christine Tremarco as Detective Natasha Evermore
- Annes Elwy as Seren
- Gary Lewis
- John Bradley
- Sam Keeley
- Martin McCann
- Fflyn Edwards
- Emily Stott
- Ellora Torchia
- Gwilym Lee
- Michael Jibson
- Crystal Condie
- Siôn Alun Davies
- Oliver Finnegan
- Rhodri Meilir
- Arthur Hughes
- Caryn Power
- Ryan Jones

== Production ==
The five-part thriller series is written by Matt Hartley and produced by Clerkenwell Films with episodes directed by Marco Kreuzpaintner and Laura Scrivano. Executive producers are Andy Baker, Charlie Langdell, Wim de Greef, Petra Fried, Matt Hartley and Marco Kreuzpaintner, with Adam Knopf as series producer.

The cast is led by Callum Scott Howells, Michael Socha, Annes Elwy and Christine Tremarco. The cast also includes Gary Lewis, John Bradley, Sam Keeley, Martin McCann, Fflyn Edwards, Emily Stott, Ellora Torchia, Gwilym Lee, Michael Jibson, Crystal Condie, Siôn Alun Davies, Oliver Finnegan, Rhodri Meilir, Arthur Hughes and Ryan Jones.

Filming took place in Wales in September 2025.
