= An Irish Goodbye =

2022 short film

- Film poster
- Directed by: Tom Berkeley; Ross White
- Written by: Tom Berkeley; Ross White
- Produced by: Tom Berkeley; Ross White; Pearce Cullen
- Starring: James Martin; Seamus O'Hara; Paddy Jenkins; Michelle Fairley
- Cinematography: Narayan Van Maele
- Edited by: Stephen Dunne
- Music by: Anthony Eve
- Production company: Floodlight Pictures
- Release date: 4 March 2022 (United States)
- Running time: 23 minutes
- Country: Ireland
- Language: English

An Irish Goodbye is a 2022 Irish short comedy film written, directed, and produced by Tom Berkeley and Ross White. The film stars James Martin, Seamus O'Hara, Paddy Jenkins, and Michelle Fairley.

== Plot ==
Turlough McCaffrey lives in London and is estranged from his brother, Lorcan, who has Down syndrome. Their mother, Grainne, dies from an illness; Turlough returns to the family farm in rural Glenmornan in order to sell the property and take Lorcan to live with their aunt, but Lorcan refuses. Lorcan explains that the local priest, Father O'Shea, gave him a list of things Grainne wanted to do before dying. Turlough insists that the list is now useless, and later fights with Lorcan about Lorcan's desire to stay and take care of the farm.

The next morning, Turlough prepares to drive Lorcan away, but Lorcan refuses to leave until they have finished all 100 wishes on the list. Turlough reluctantly agrees and the brothers happily bond once more as they check off the wishes on Grainne's list by using her urn as her stand-in for activities such as modelling for a painting, flying with balloons, and smoking marijuana. However, Turlough becomes upset when Lorcan breaks the urn in order to fulfill the 99th item on the list: skydiving. He insists that this is the reason Lorcan cannot be trusted with the farm and officially puts the property up for sale.

As Turlough prepares to finally move Lorcan out, he is greeted by Father O'Shea, who reveals that he never gave Lorcan a list. Turlough confronts Lorcan over the lie and Lorcan apologises, but Turlough then suggests that they finish the list by fulfilling the 100th item: going to space. They send up Grainne's ashes with fireworks as they recline by a bonfire, and Lorcan adds a 101st item on the list: the wish that he and Turlough become best friends again, and that Turlough will leave London to stay and take care of the family farm. Turlough agrees to consider it.

== Title ==
The film takes its title from "Irish goodbye," a phrase describing the action of quickly leaving a social gathering without telling anyone or saying goodbye.

== Accolades ==
The film won the Academy Award for Best Live Action Short Film at the 2023 Academy Awards and the BAFTA Award for Best Short Film at the 2023 British Academy Film Awards.
