= Let It Shine (2017 TV series) =

British reality television music competition

- Created by: Gary Barlow
- Presented by: Graham Norton; Mel Giedroyc
- Judges: Gary Barlow; Dannii Minogue; Martin Kemp; Amber Riley (guest); Lulu (guest); Ricki Lake (guest); Ashley Roberts (guest); Peter Kay (guest)
- Country of origin: United Kingdom
- Original language: English
- No. of series: 1
- No. of episodes: 10

Production
- Executive producer: Andrew Cartmell
- Producer: Gary Barlow
- Production location: Dock10
- Editor: Guy Freeman
- Running time: 30–105 minutes
- Production company: BBC Studios

Original release
- Network: BBC One
- Release: 7 January – 25 February 2017

Let It Shine is a British reality television music competition to find young men to star in The Band, a new stage musical featuring the songs of Take That. It aired in January and February 2017 on BBC One. In 2018, the BBC announced that Let It Shine has been cancelled after one series.

The show was presented by Graham Norton and Mel Giedroyc, with Gary Barlow, Dannii Minogue and Martin Kemp serving as judges throughout the series. Amber Riley was the guest judge for the auditions, followed by Lulu for the group round. Ricki Lake was the guest judge for the first live show, Ashley Roberts for the semi-final and Peter Kay for the final.

The show was won by the band Five to Five, who won the part as the band in the new musical The Band, which began touring in September 2017.

== Production ==
The show's title comes from Take That's 2007 single "Shine". Amber Riley, Lulu, Ricki Lake, Ashley Roberts and Peter Kay acted as guest judges of the competition, respectively. Busted, Beverley Knight, Melanie C, Olly Murs and Kaiser Chiefs performed with the contestants split into groups as part of the second round of the competition, which was filmed at Dock10, MediaCityUK in November 2016.

== Format ==
There are three stages to the competition:

- "The Starway" (auditions)
- "The Collaborations" (group stage)
- "The Battle of the Bands" (live shows)

== The Starway ==
The judges each have 5 stars and each contestant is scored out of 20 stars; in order to proceed onto the next round they needed 15 stars.

=== Episode 1 (7 January) ===
Act	Order	Age	Song	Stars	
Clinton Elvis	1	23	"(Your Love Keeps Lifting Me) Higher and Higher"	16/20 stars	16
Deaglan Arthurs	2	18	"New York, New York"	18/20 stars	18
Jamie-Ryan Taylor	3	21	"Last Request"	11/20 stars	11
Jazzie Mattis	4	24	"Uptown Funk"	17/20 stars	17
Tyler Jack Smith	5	19	"You Are So Beautiful"	17/20 stars	17
Hector Mitchell-Turner	6	21	"You Get What You Give"	11/20 stars	11
Zak Robinson	7	17	"(Sittin' On) The Dock of the Bay"	14/20 stars	14
Bobby Foord	8	16	"7 Days"	11/20 stars	11
Nicky Price	9	17	"Say Something"	20/20 stars	20
Nick Carsberg	10	17	"Dance with Me Tonight"	16/20 stars	16
Wayne Thurtell	11	25	"My Girl"	11/20 stars	11
Jason Brock	12	30	"Run to You"	20/20 stars	20

=== Episode 2 (14 January) ===
Act	Order	Age	Song	Stars	
Jonnie Halliwell	1	25	"Reet Petite"	20/20 stars	20
Dylan Reid	2	20	"Roar"	16/20 stars	16
Lee Stinchcombe	3	35	"The Power of Love"	8/20 stars	8
Samm Hewitt	4	23	"Dear Darlin'"	12/20 stars	12
Keith Branic	5	16	"Treasure"	15/20 stars	15
Ciaran O'Brien	6	16	"Dancing On My Own"	15/20 stars	15
Craig Webb	7	27	"Jealous"	18/20 stars	18
Damien Kivlehan	8	26	"You Give Love a Bad Name"	16/20 stars	16
Curtis T Johns	9	23	"Put Your Records On"	19/20 stars	19
Julius Wright	10	20	"All Night Long (All Night)"	16/20 stars	16
Jamie Corner	11	24	"Johnny B. Goode"	17/20 stars	17
Scott Sutcliffe	12	23	"Against All Odds (Take a Look at Me Now)"	14/20 stars	14
Huw Roberts	13	16	"Don't Look Back in Anger"	16/20 stars	16
Harry Neale	14	26	"Beggin'"	16/20 stars	16

=== Episode 3 (21 January) ===
Act	Order	Age	Song	Stars	
Jordan Harvey	1	24	"Blame It on Me"	18/20 stars	18
AJ Bentley	2	21	"Signed, Sealed, Delivered I'm Yours"	18/20 stars	18
Dion McGrath	3	23	"All About You"	13/20 stars	13
Matt Thorpe	4	30	"If I Ain't Got You"	20/20 stars	20
Dan Budd	5	27	"No Regrets"	16/20 stars	16
Elijah Holloway	6	18	"Greased Lightnin'"	11/20 stars	11
Mark Angels	7	21	"Mirrors"	17/20 stars	17
Harry Brown	8	17	"Love Yourself"	17/20 stars	17
Jordan Charles	9	24	"Pompeii"	15/20 stars	15
Danny Colligan	10	23	"Stitches"	15/20 stars	15
Kyle Passmore	11	27	"You Give Me Something	19/20 stars	19
Josh Bailey	12	17	"Jealous"	19/20 stars	19
Matt Knight	13	27	"Wake Me Up"	16/20 stars	16
Tayler Davis	14	21	"Faith"	14/20 stars	14
Hercules Smith	15	33	"Iris"	16/20 stars	16

=== Episode 4 (28 January) ===
Act	Order	Age	Song	Stars	
Callum Howells	1	17	"You'll Be Back"	16/20 stars	16
Scott Macaulay	2	18	"Laura"	19/20 stars	19
Luke Stanley	3	27	"All of Me"	15/20 stars	15
Travis Kerry	4	19	"Feel So Close"	11/20 stars	11
Alexis Gerred	5	27	"Come Together"	18/20 stars	18
Robert Evans	6	20	"Can You Feel the Love Tonight"	12/20 stars	12
Andrew Mott	7	22	"More Than Words"	12/20 stars	12
Kieran McManus	8	18	"Little Things"	12/20 stars	12
Sam Glen	9	23	"Torn"	16/20 stars	16
Connor Cunningham	10	21	"Brown Eyed Girl"	15/20 stars	15
Ryan Butterworth	11	21	"I Still Haven't Found What I'm Looking For	16/20 stars	16
Sario Solomon	12	19	"Tainted Love"	16/20 stars	16
Anthony Sahota	13	22	"Ordinary People"	16/20 stars	16
Liam Holmes	14	27	"Let's Get It On"	13/20 stars	13
Conor McLoughlin	15	20	"Your Song"	17/20 stars	17
Yazdan Qafouri	16	17	"Ain't No Sunshine"	15/20 stars	15
Jimmy Haggar	17	19	"That's Life"	13/20 stars	13
Veeraj Lutchman	18	37	"Take Me to Church"	16/20 stars	16
Jack Hinton	19	22	"Viva Forever"	15/20 stars	15
Bradley Johnson	20	19	"Bring Him Home"	20/20 stars	20

== The Collaborations ==
After the episode, a clip was made available on BBC iPlayer which revealed the new names of the bands. Group 1 was named Five to Five, Group 2 was named Iron Sun, Group 3 was named Neon Panda, Group 4 was named Drive and Group 5 was named Nightfall.

=== Episode 5 (4 February) ===
- Guest judge: Lulu
- Group performance: "Kidz"/ "Hangin' Tough"/ "When Will I Be Famous?"/ "Sing"

==== Group 1 ====
- Collaboration with Olly Murs

Artist	Song	Results
AJ Bentley	"Troublemaker"/ "Unpredictable" /"Heart Skips a Beat"/ "Wrapped Up"	Safe
Connor Cunningham	"Troublemaker"/ "Unpredictable" /"Heart Skips a Beat"/ "Wrapped Up"	Eliminated
Curtis T Johns	"Troublemaker"/ "Unpredictable" /"Heart Skips a Beat"/ "Wrapped Up"	Safe
Nick Carsberg	"Troublemaker"/ "Unpredictable" /"Heart Skips a Beat"/ "Wrapped Up"	Safe
Sario Solomon	"Troublemaker"/ "Unpredictable" /"Heart Skips a Beat"/ "Wrapped Up"	Safe
Scott Macaulay	"Troublemaker"/ "Unpredictable" /"Heart Skips a Beat"/ "Wrapped Up"	Eliminated
Tyler Jack Smith	"Troublemaker"/ "Unpredictable" /"Heart Skips a Beat"/ "Wrapped Up"	Eliminated
Yazdan Qafouri	"Troublemaker"/ "Unpredictable" /"Heart Skips a Beat"/ "Wrapped Up"	Safe

==== Group 2 ====
- Collaboration with Beverley Knight

Artist	Song	Results
Alexis Gerred	"Twist and Shout"/ "I Wanna Dance with Somebody (Who Loves Me)" /"Hold On, I'm Coming"	Safe
Clinton Elvis	"Twist and Shout"/ "I Wanna Dance with Somebody (Who Loves Me)" /"Hold On, I'm Coming"	Safe
Damien Kivlehan	"Twist and Shout"/ "I Wanna Dance with Somebody (Who Loves Me)" /"Hold On, I'm Coming"	Eliminated
Dylan Reid	"Twist and Shout"/ "I Wanna Dance with Somebody (Who Loves Me)" /"Hold On, I'm Coming"	Eliminated
Harry Brown	"Twist and Shout"/ "I Wanna Dance with Somebody (Who Loves Me)" /"Hold On, I'm Coming"	Safe
Jordan Harvey	"Twist and Shout"/ "I Wanna Dance with Somebody (Who Loves Me)" /"Hold On, I'm Coming"	Safe
Matt Knight	"Twist and Shout"/ "I Wanna Dance with Somebody (Who Loves Me)" /"Hold On, I'm Coming"	Safe
Veeraj Lutchman	"Twist and Shout"/ "I Wanna Dance with Somebody (Who Loves Me)" /"Hold On, I'm Coming"	Eliminated

==== Group 3 ====
- Collaboration with Busted

Artist	Song	Results
Anthony Sahota	"Sleeping with the Light On"/ "On What You're On" /"Year 3000"	Safe
Conor McLoughlin	"Sleeping with the Light On"/ "On What You're On" /"Year 3000"	Safe
Craig Webb	"Sleeping with the Light On"/ "On What You're On" /"Year 3000"	Safe
Dan Budd	"Sleeping with the Light On"/ "On What You're On" /"Year 3000"	Eliminated
Deaglan Arthurs	"Sleeping with the Light On"/ "On What You're On" /"Year 3000"	Eliminated
Josh Bailey	"Sleeping with the Light On"/ "On What You're On" /"Year 3000"	Safe
Luke Stanley	"Sleeping with the Light On"/ "On What You're On" /"Year 3000"	Eliminated
Matt Thorpe	"Sleeping with the Light On"/ "On What You're On" /"Year 3000"	Safe

==== Group 4 ====
- Collaboration with Kaiser Chiefs

Artist	Song	Results
Jamie Corner	"Ruby"/ "Hole In My Soul" /"I Predict a Riot"	Safe
Jazzie Mattis	"Ruby"/ "Hole In My Soul" /"I Predict a Riot"	Safe
Jonnie Halliwell	"Ruby"/ "Hole In My Soul" /"I Predict a Riot"	Safe
Jordan Charles	"Ruby"/ "Hole In My Soul" /"I Predict a Riot"	Eliminated
Keith Branic	"Ruby"/ "Hole In My Soul" /"I Predict a Riot"	Eliminated
Mark Angels	"Ruby"/ "Hole In My Soul" /"I Predict a Riot"	Safe
Ryan Butterworth	"Ruby"/ "Hole In My Soul" /"I Predict a Riot"	Safe
Sam Glen	"Ruby"/ "Hole In My Soul" /"I Predict a Riot"	Eliminated

- Originally Callum Howells & Harry Neale were part of Group 4 but decided to withdraw from the competition, they were replaced by reserves Keith Branic & Jordan Charles.

==== Group 5 ====
- Collaboration with Melanie C

Artist	Song	Results
Bradley Johnson	"I Turn to You"/ "Anymore" /"When You're Gone"	Safe
Danny Colligan	"I Turn to You"/ "Anymore" /"When You're Gone"	Safe
Hercules Smith	"I Turn to You"/ "Anymore" /"When You're Gone"	Eliminated
Huw Roberts	"I Turn to You"/ "Anymore" /"When You're Gone"	Safe
Jason Brock	"I Turn to You"/ "Anymore" /"When You're Gone"	Safe
Julius Wright	"I Turn to You"/ "Anymore" /"When You're Gone"	Safe
Kyle Passmore	"I Turn to You"/ "Anymore" /"When You're Gone"	Eliminated
Nicky Price	"I Turn to You"/ "Anymore" /"When You're Gone"	Eliminated

== The Battle of the Bands ==
=== Live show details ===
==== Results summary ====
Result's colour key
Artist was part of the Band in bottom two
Artist was eliminated
Artist qualified for the band

Weekly results per artist
Artist	Week 1	Week 2	Week 3
AJ Bentley	Safe	Safe	Winners (week 3)
Curtis T Johns	Safe	Safe	Winners (week 3)
Nick Carsberg	Safe	Safe	Winners (week 3)
Sario Solomon	Safe	Safe	Winners (week 3)
Yazdan Qafouri	Safe	Safe	Winners (week 3)
Bradley Johnson	Safe	Safe	Runners-up (week 3)
Conor McLoughlin	Bottom two	Bottom two	Runners-up (week 3)
Danny Colligan	Safe	Safe	Runners-up (week 3)
Huw Roberts	Safe	Safe	Runners-up (week 3)
Jason Brock	Safe	Safe	Runners-up (week 3)
Jazzie Mattis	Bottom two	Bottom two	Runners-up (week 3)
Jonnie Halliwell	Bottom two	Bottom two	Runners-up (week 3)
Julius Wright	Safe	Safe	Runners-up (week 3)
Mark Angels	Bottom two	Bottom two	Runners-up (week 3)
Matt Thorpe	Bottom two	Bottom two	Runners-up (week 3)
Alexis Gerred	Safe	Eliminated	Eliminated (week 2)
Clinton Elvis	Safe	Eliminated	Eliminated (week 2)
Harry Brown	Safe	Eliminated	Eliminated (week 2)
Jordan Harvey	Safe	Eliminated	Eliminated (week 2)
Matt Knight	Safe	Eliminated	Eliminated (week 2)
Anthony Sahota	Eliminated	Eliminated (week 1)	
Craig Webb	Eliminated	Eliminated (week 1)	
Jamie Corner	Eliminated	Eliminated (week 1)	
Josh Bailey	Eliminated	Eliminated (week 1)	
Ryan Butterworth	Eliminated	Eliminated (week 1)	

==== Week 1: Quarter final (11 February) ====
- Guest judge: Ricki Lake
- Group performance: "This Is How We Do It"/ "Hot in Herre"/ "(Shake, Shake, Shake) Shake Your Booty"/ "Eye of the Tiger"/ "What Makes You Beautiful"/ "Treasure"/ "Hey Ya!"/ "No Diggity"
- Guest performance: Jersey Boys ("Sherry"/ "Big Girls Don't Cry"/ "Walk Like a Man"/ "Beggin'"/ "December, 1963 (Oh, What a Night)")

Band	Order	Song	Results
Iron Sun	1	"Shut Up and Dance"	Safe
Drive	2	"Everybody Get Up"/ "I Love Rock 'n' Roll"	Bottom two
Nightfall	3	"The Scientist"	Safe
Neon Panda	4	"Marry You"	Bottom two
Five to Five	5	"MMMBop"	Safe
Sing-off
Drive	1	"A Million Love Songs"	
Neon Panda	2	"Greatest Day"	

- Mark Angels, Jazzie Mattis, Matt Thorpe, Jonnie Halliwell & Conor McLoughlin were saved by the judges and through to Semi-final. As Drive had 3 of the 5 members saved and Neon Panda only had 2 of the 5 the saved artist would continue as Drive.
- Anthony Sahota, Craig Webb, Jamie Corner, Josh Bailey & Ryan Butterworth were not saved and therefore were eliminated from the competition.

==== Week 2: Semi-final (18 February) ====
- Guest judge: Ashley Roberts
- Group performance: "It Only Takes a Minute"/ "Could It Be Magic"/ "Relight My Fire"/ "Pray"/ "Shine" (with Take That)
- Guest performance: Motown: The Musical: ("Do You Love Me"/ "Dancing in the Street")

Band	Order	Song	Results
Five to Five	1	"Tell Her About It"	Safe
Iron Sun	2	"Born This Way"	Bottom two
Drive	3	"Girls on Film"	Bottom two
Nightfall	4	"Without You"	Safe
Sing-off
Iron Sun	1	"The Long and Winding Road"	
Drive	2	"Something"	

- Mark Angels, Matt Thorpe, Jonnie Halliwell, Conor McLoughlin & Jazzie Mattis were saved by the judges and through to Final and continue as Drive.
- Alexis Gerred, Clinton Elvis, Harry Brown, Jordan Harvey and Matt Knight were not saved and therefore were eliminated from the competition.

==== Week 3: Final (25 February) ====
- Guest judge: Peter Kay
- Theme: Musical classic & pop number
- Guest performance: Michael Ball & Alfie Boe: ("Les Misérables Medley") and Take That with Robbie Williams: ("The Flood")

Band	Order	First song	Order	Second song	Result
Nightfall	1	"Footloose"	4	"End of the Road"	Runners-up
Five to Five	2	"You Can't Stop the Beat"	5	"Wrecking Ball"	Winners
Drive	3	"Grease"	6	"Thinking Out Loud"	Runners-up

- Winning group: Five to Five (Yazdan Qafouri, Curtis T Johns, Nick Carsberg, Sario Solomon, AJ Bentley)

== Promotion ==
During an appearance on Alan Carr: Chatty Man in December, Barlow, Minogue and Kemp confirmed the show's launch date as 7 January 2017, the same date as The Voice UK's sixth series' premiere on ITV; and also showed a sneak-peek of one of the auditionees, and revealed the series' format and stages.

== Broadcast ==
Internationally, the series began airing in Australia on BBC UKTV from 22 January 2017.

== Ratings ==
All ratings are sourced from BARB.

Episode	Air date	Viewers (millions)	BBC One weekly ranking	Viewing share
The Starway 1	7 January	7.13	10	29.9%
The Starway 2	14 January	6.00	14	26.7%
The Starway 3	21 January	5.83	14	25.9%
The Starway 4	28 January	5.08	20	23.6%
The Collaborations	4 February	5.25	17	23.9%
Battle of the Bands 1	11 February	5.10	16	23.4%
Battle of the Bands Results 1	11 February	4.30	25	18.0%
Battle of the Bands 2	18 February	4.80	21	22.5%
Battle of the Bands Results 2	18 February	4.27	26	18.0%
Battle of the Bands 3	25 February	4.61	18	19.7%
Series average	2017	5.24	—N/a	—N/a
