= The Voice UK series 6 =

Sixth series of The Voice UK

The Voice UK
- Series 6
- Hosted by: Emma Willis; Cel Spellman (ITV Hub)
- Coaches: will.i.am; Jennifer Hudson; Sir Tom Jones; Gavin Rossdale
- Winner: Mo Adeniran
- Winning mentor: Jennifer Hudson
- Runner-up: Into the Ark
- Finals venue: LH2 Studios
- No. of episodes: 17

Release
- Original network: ITV; ITV Hub (The V Room)
- Original release: 7 January – 2 April 2017

Series chronology
- ← Previous; Series 5 Next → Series 7

The Voice UK is a British television music competition to find new singing talent. The sixth series began airing on 7 January 2017, with Emma Willis hosting the main show, and Cel Spellman presenting online spin-off show The V Room. It is the first series to air on ITV since its move from BBC One. Of the four coaches from the previous series, only will.i.am returned, which marks his sixth series as a coach, Former coach Sir Tom Jones also returned to the show after a series hiatus, replacing Paloma Faith for his fifth series, and Jennifer Hudson and Gavin Rossdale joined as new coaches on the show, replacing Boy George and Ricky Wilson. Mo Adeniran won the competition, marking Jennifer Hudson's first and only win as a coach. Additionally, JHud became the first new coach to win on her first attempt, as well as, the first female coach to win a series of the show.

== Coaches and presenters ==
Coaches for series 6 of The Voice UK

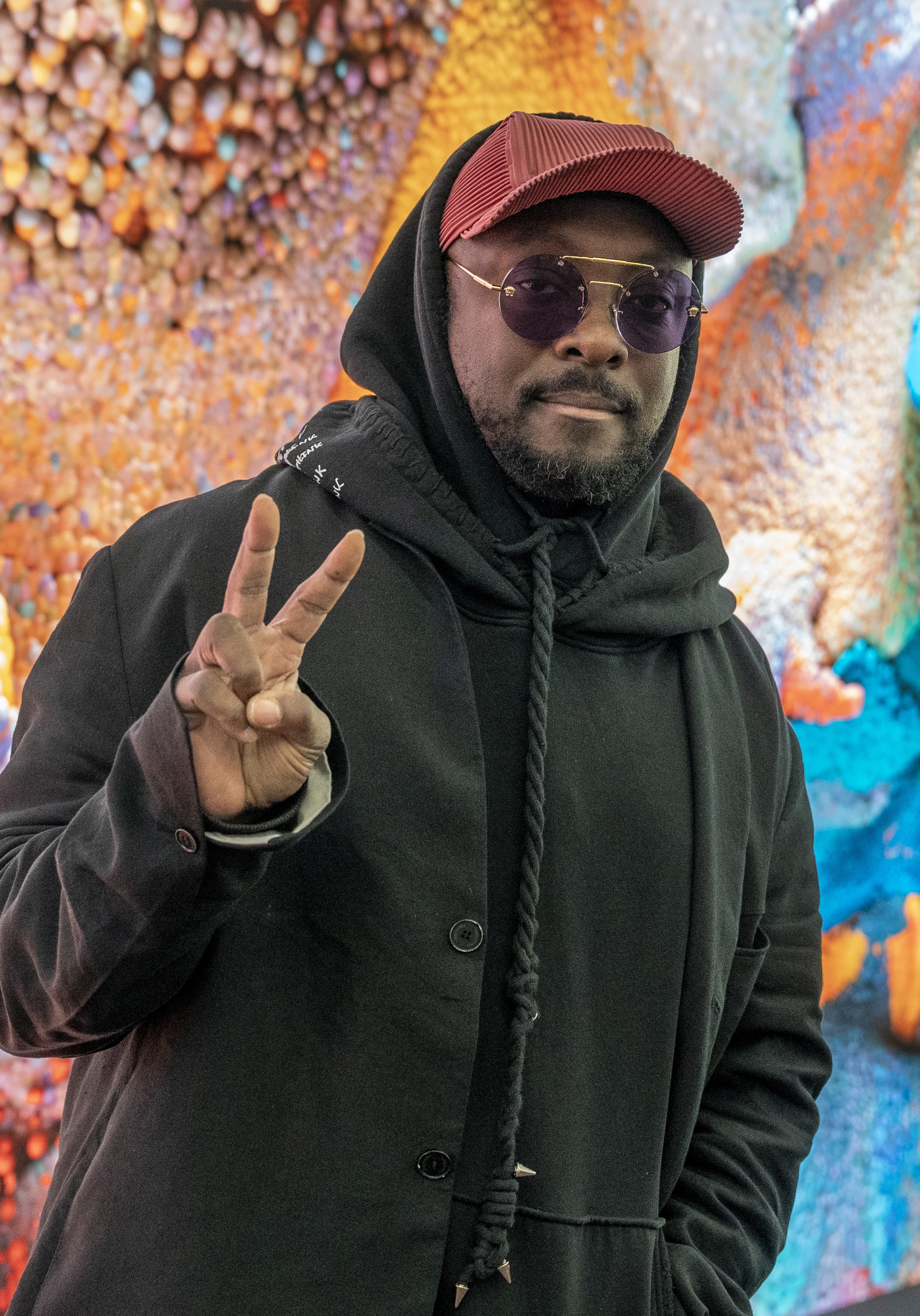
will.i.am

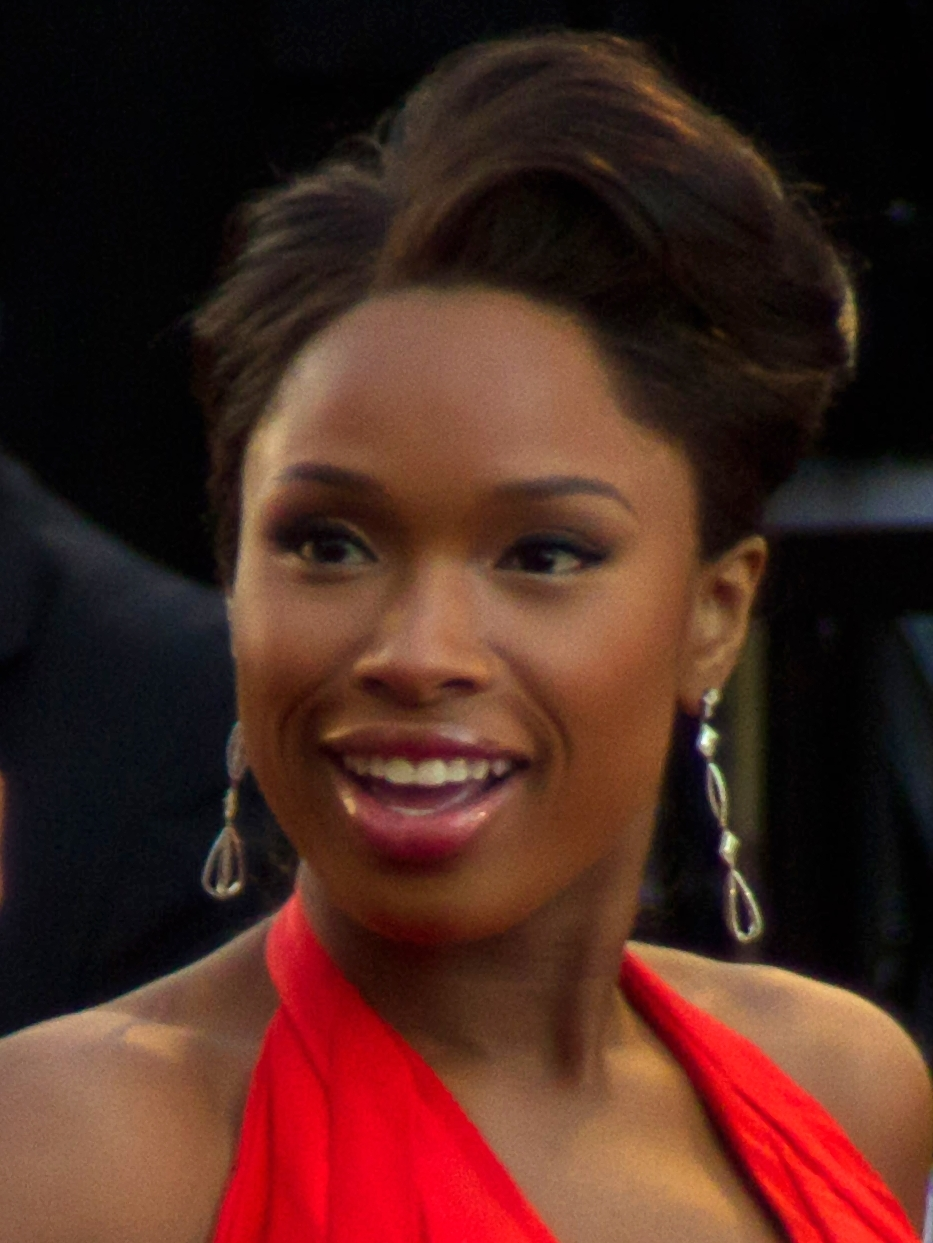
Jennifer Hudson

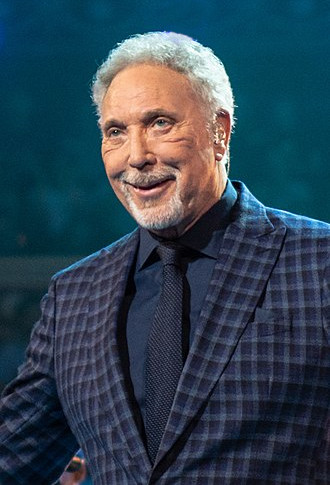
Sir Tom Jones

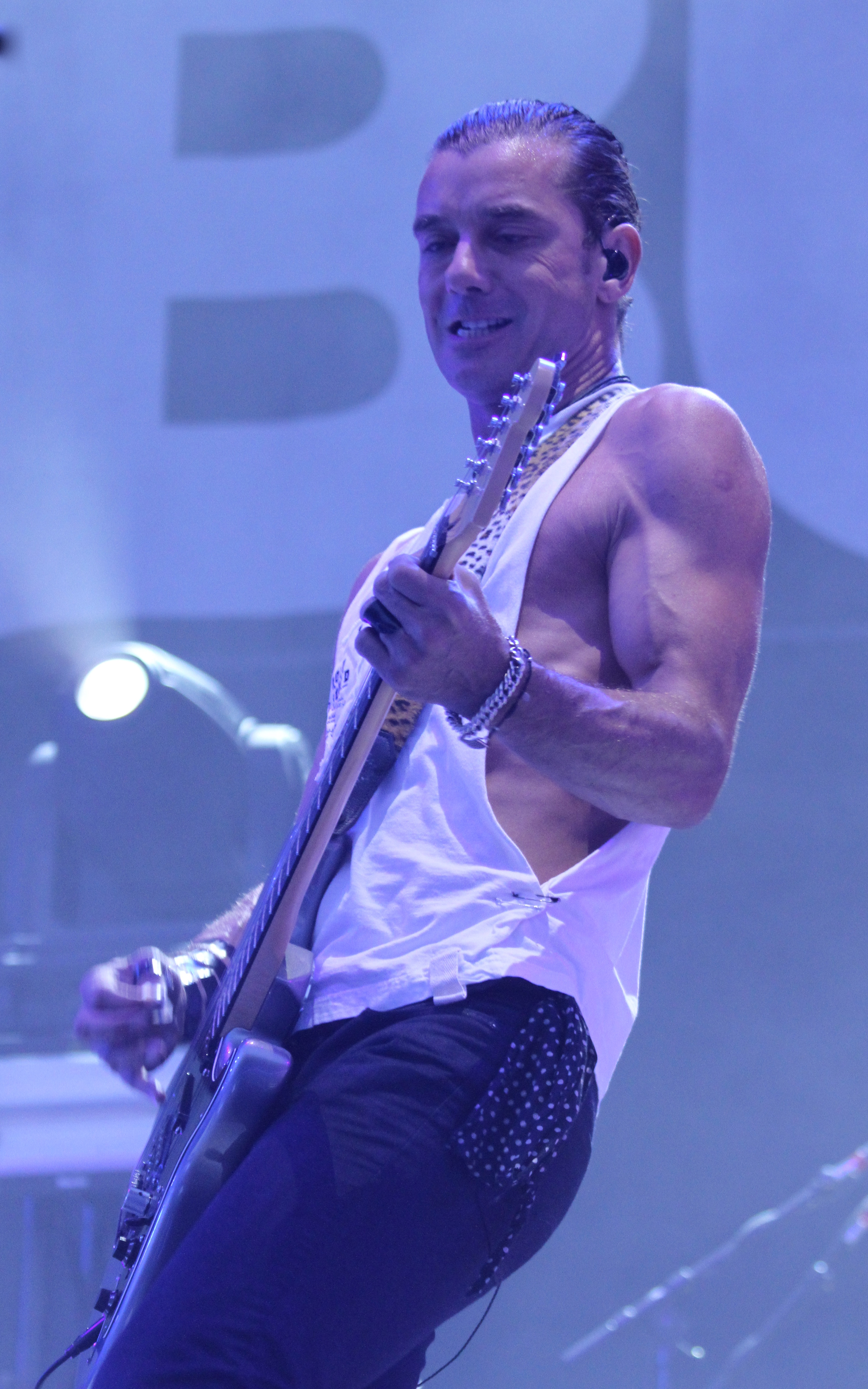
Gavin Rossdale

On 13 November 2015, Ricky Wilson announced that the fifth series would be his last as a coach. However, on 24 March 2016, it was revealed that he could make a return to the show. On 3 July 2016, coach will.i.am, who had his doubts about returning for his sixth series, confirmed that he will return for the new series. On 5 July 2016, Boy George announced his departure from the show after just one series. Former coach, Sir Tom Jones hinted that he could possibly return to the programme after the show had moved to ITV. On 17 July 2016, another former coach, Jessie J, ruled herself out of returning to The Voice UK for the sixth series, after speculation of her returning to the show. Wilson later confirmed that he would not be involved with the show for series 6 later in the month. On 28 September, the coaching line-up was confirmed as will.i.am, Jennifer Hudson, Gavin Rossdale, with Jones also returning. On her appointment, Hudson commented, "I couldn't be more excited to join the amazing panel of coaches on The Voice UK! The UK has always been so supportive of me since the beginning of my career so I’m really looking forward to sharing my point of view with the contestants and especially Team JHUD. Discovering new artists has always been important to me and the UK has no shortage of talent, so I can only imagine what this experience will be like for everyone involved. I can't wait to get going and start developing each individual’s own sound!"

Emma Willis announced that she would return to present the show alone, without her co-host Marvin Humes' involvement. On 8 August 2016, it was announced that a planned ITV2 unnamed spinoff show had been scrapped. However, in October 2016, it was announced that Cel Spellman would be presenting an online spin-off show titled The V Room that would be available on-demand via ITV Hub and feature exclusive content across social media sites and the show's mobile app.

== Teams ==
Colour key:

- Winner
- Runner-up
- Third place
- Fourth place
- Eliminated in the Live shows
- Eliminated in the Knockouts
- Artist was stolen by another coach at the Battles
- Eliminated in the Battles

Coach	Top 40 artists					
will.i.am						
will.i.am	Michelle John	Jason Jones	Tanya Lacey	Hayley Eccles	Clara Hurtado	Lia White
will.i.am	~~Tim Gallagher~~	~~Victoria Kerley~~	Lawrence Hill	Jazmin Sawyers	Shakira Lueshing	
Jennifer Hudson						
Jennifer Hudson	Mo Adeniran	Jamie Miller	Jack Bruley	Tim Gallagher	David Jackson	Georgie Braggins
Jennifer Hudson	~~Diamond~~	Liza Baker	Kit Rice	Stacey Skeete	Israel Allen	
Sir Tom Jones						
Sir Tom Jones	Into The Ark	Craig Ward	Nadine McGhee	Capital B	Dannii Barnes	Victoria Kerley
Sir Tom Jones	Linda Jennings	Septimus Prime	Ryhann Thomas	Lucy Kane	Charlie Drew	
Gavin Rossdale						
Gavin Rossdale	Max Vickers	Truly Ford	Sarah Morgan	Keziah Rodell	Diamond	Carter
Gavin Rossdale	~~Tanya Lacey~~	Ruth Lockwood	Hadleigh Ford	Millicent Weaver	Bosie	
Note: Italicised names are stolen artists (names struck through within former teams).

== Blind auditions ==
There was a change to the blind auditions format for 2017; if all the coaches reject an auditionee they keep their back to the singer and will not say what they thought about their performance, as well as not being able to meet them. The blind auditions began filming on 19 October 2016 at dock10, MediaCityUK in Salford.

Each coach has the length of the artist's performance to decide if they want that artist on their team. Should two or more coaches want the same artist, then the artist will choose their coach.

Colour key

✔	Coach hit his/her "I WANT YOU" button
	Artist defaulted to this coach's team
	Artist elected to join this coach's team
	Artist eliminated with no coach pressing his or her "I WANT YOU" button
	Artist had all four chairs turned

=== Episode 1 (7 January) ===
The series premiere aired from 8.00pm until 9.35pm.

- Group performance: The Voice UK coaches – "Under Pressure"

Order	Artist	Age	Song	Coaches and artists choices			
Order	Artist	Age	Song	will.i.am	JHud	Tom	Gavin
1	Jason Jones	31	"Pillowtalk"	✔	✔	✔	✔
2	Jenny Jones	18	"Dangerous Woman"	—	—	—	—
3	Into the Ark	20–25	"Burning Love"	—	✔	✔	✔
4	Diamond	18	"If I Ain't Got You"	✔	✔	—	✔
5	Rachel Rose	27	"Love Me Like You Do"	—	—	—	—
6	Jamie Grey	28	"Never Ever"	—	—	—	—
7	Truly Ford	22	"Dakota"	—	—	✔	✔
8	Max Vickers	24	"You Can Call Me Al"	—	—	—	✔
9	Mo Adeniran	21	"Iron Sky"	✔	✔	✔	✔

=== Episode 2 (14 January) ===
This episode aired from 8.00pm until 9.30pm.

Order	Artist	Age	Song	Coaches and artists choices			
Order	Artist	Age	Song	will.i.am	Jennifer	Tom	Gavin
1	Capital B	20–21	"His Eye Is on the Sparrow"	—	—	✔	✔
2	Chelsea Baldwin	29	"Vissi d'arte"	—	—	—	—
3	Charlie Drew	28	"One Dance"	—	—	✔	✔
4	Georgie Braggins	21	"Ev'ry Time We Say Goodbye"	—	✔	—	✔
5	Jamie Miller	19	"Let It Go"	—	✔	—	✔
6	Carter	29	"I Don't Want to Miss a Thing"	—	✔	✔	✔
7	Shannon Kitchen	18	"Roxanne"	—	—	—	—
8	Ben Fernihough	40	"Trouble"	—	—	—	—
9	Michelle John	43	"It's a Man's Man's Man's World"	✔	—	—	—

=== Episode 3 (21 January) ===
This episode aired from 8.00pm until 9.30pm.

Order	Artist	Age	Song	Coaches and artists choices			
Order	Artist	Age	Song	will.i.am	Jennifer	Tom	Gavin
1	April Sullivan	23	"Don't Rain on My Parade"	—	—	—	—
2	Millicent Weaver	18	"Where Is My Mind?"	—	—	—	✔
3	David Jackson	29	"All I Want"	—	✔	✔	✔
4	Kevin Prone	25	"Cinema Paradiso Love"	—	—	—	—
5	Craig Ward	31	"She's Always a Woman"	✔	—	✔	✔
6	Gino Eccles	54	"You Are So Beautiful"	—	—	—	—
7	Hayley Eccles	22	"Upside Down"	✔	—	—	—
8	Jazmin Sawyers	22	"Here"/"Glory Box"	✔	—	—	—
9	Sarah Morgan	16	"Missed"	—	—	✔	✔

=== Episode 4 (28 January) ===
This episode aired from 8.00pm until 9.30pm.

Order	Artist	Age	Song	Coaches and artists choices			
Order	Artist	Age	Song	will.i.am	Jennifer	Tom	Gavin
1	Jack Bruley	20	"Tennessee Whiskey"	—	✔	—	—
2	Ryan James	26	"I Heard It Through the Grapevine" / "Superstition"	—	—	—	—
3	Hadleigh Ford	38	"This Year's Love"	—	—	—	✔
4	Liza Baker	44	"Alone"	—	✔	—	—
5	Jon Middleton	19	"You're Beautiful"	—	—	—	—
6	Clara Hurtado	20	"Latch"	✔	✔	✔	✔
7	Ryhann Thomas	28	"I Swear"	—	—	✔	—
8	Chantelle Jackson	23	"Don't Let Go (Love)"	—	—	—	—
9	Tanya Lacey	31	"All the Man That I Need"	—	—	✔	✔

=== Episode 5 (4 February) ===
This episode aired from 8.00pm until 9.30pm.

Order	Artist	Age	Song	Coaches and artists choices			
Order	Artist	Age	Song	will.i.am	Jennifer	Tom	Gavin
1	Shakira Lueshing	28	"Freak of the Week"	✔	—	—	—
2	Lawrence Hill	25	"Save Tonight"	✔	—	—	—
3	Tom Johnston	22	"Hometown Glory"	—	—	—	—
4	Zara Okro	18	"Alive"	—	—	—	—
5	Bosie	21-21	"Wicked Game"	—	—	—	✔
6	Scarlet Thomas-Perry	22	"Syrup & Honey"	—	—	—	—
7	Dannii Barnes	20	"Tears"	—	—	✔	—
8	Lucy Kane	20	"Will You Love Me Tomorrow"	—	—	✔	✔
9	Miss Cherry Bomb	40	"Diamonds Are Forever"	—	—	—	—
10	Israel Allen	26	"And I Am Telling You I'm Not Going"	—	✔	—	✔

=== Episode 6 (11 February) ===
This episode aired from 8.00pm until 9.20pm.

Order	Artist	Age	Song	Coaches and artists choices			
Order	Artist	Age	Song	will.i.am	Jennifer	Tom	Gavin
1	Tom Seals	23	"Mess Around"	—	—	—	—
2	Stacey Skeete	27	"Shackles (Praise You)"	—	✔	✔	—
3	Lia White	17	"FourFiveSeconds"	✔	—	✔	—
4	Ciara Harvie	18	"Nessun dorma"	—	—	—	—
5	Sam O’Hara	25	"Don't Worry Baby"	—	—	—	—
6	Keziah Rodell	20	"Work Song"	✔	✔	✔	✔
7	Hannah Ormerod	27	"Wake Me Up"	—	—	—	—
8	Septimus Prime	19	"Love Yourself"	—	—	✔	—
9	Nadine McGhee	18	"Lay Me Down"	—	—	✔	—

=== Episode 7 (18 February) ===
This episode aired from 8.00pm until 9.20pm.

Order	Artist	Age	Song	Coaches and artists choices			
Order	Artist	Age	Song	will.i.am	Jennifer	Tom	Gavin
1	Paul Woodley	31	"Come Together"	—	—	—	—
2	Abi Phillips	22	"Girl Crush"	—	—	—	—
3	Kit Rice	25	"Ain't No Sunshine"	—	✔	—	✔
4	Kelly Irwin	16	"All I Could Do Was Cry"	—	Team full	—	—
5	Tim Gallagher	23	"Crash"	✔	Team full	✔	✔
6	Gavin Ellis	30	"Tears in Heaven"	—	Team full	—	—
7	Linda Jennings	49	"The Long and Winding Road"	✔	Team full	✔	✔
8	Victoria Kerley	16	"Treat You Better"	✔	Team full	Team full	✔
9	Ruth Lockwood	23	"Toxic"	Team full	Team full	Team full	✔

== Battle rounds ==
Filming for the battles began in December 2016 at MediaCityUK, following the taping of the blind auditions. Each coach has only one steal. The first part of the battle rounds was broadcast on 25 February 2017 with part two airing on 26 February 2017. The first part of the battle rounds was broadcast on 25 February 2017 with part two airing on 26 February 2017. First episode aired from 8.30pm until 10.30pm,

Colour key

✔	Coach hit his/her "I WANT YOU" button
	Artist won the Battle and advanced to the Knockouts
	Artist lost the Battle but was stolen by another coach and advances to the Knockouts
	Artist lost the Battle and was eliminated

Episode	Coach	Order	Winner	Song	Loser	'Steal' result			
Episode	Coach	Order	Winner	Song	Loser	will.i.am	JHud	Tom	Gavin
Episode 1 (25 February)	Jennifer Hudson	1	David Jackson	"It's Your World"	Israel Allen	—	—N/a	—	—
Episode 1 (25 February)	will.i.am	2	Clara Hurtado	"Bad Blood"	Shakira Lueshing	—N/a	—	—	—
Episode 1 (25 February)	Gavin Rossdale	3	Keziah Rodell	"Why"	Bosie	—	—	—	—N/a
Episode 1 (25 February)	Tom Jones	4	Dannii Barnes	"Can't Stop the Feeling!"	Charlie Drew	—	—	—N/a	—
Episode 1 (25 February)	Gavin Rossdale	5	Max Vickers	"My Favourite Game"	Millicent Weaver	—	—	—	—N/a
Episode 1 (25 February)	Jennifer Hudson	6	Jamie Miller	"Perfect Strangers"	Stacey Skeete	—	—N/a	—	—
Episode 1 (25 February)	Gavin Rossdale	7	Truly Ford	"Go Your Own Way"	Hadleigh Ford	—	—	—	—N/a
Episode 1 (25 February)	will.i.am	8	Lia White	"Final Song"	Victoria Kerley	—N/a	—	✔	—
Episode 1 (25 February)	Tom Jones	9	Nadine McGhee	"Time After Time"	Lucy Kane	—	—	—N/a	—
Episode 1 (25 February)	Jennifer Hudson	10	Mo Adeniran	"A Change Is Gonna Come"	Diamond	—	—N/a	—N/a	✔
Episode 2 (26 February)	Gavin Rossdale	1	Carter	"Superstition"	Tanya Lacey	✔	—	—N/a	—N/a
Episode 2 (26 February)	will.i.am	2	Hayley Eccles	"Hold My Hand"	Jazmin Sawyers	—N/a	—	—N/a	—N/a
Episode 2 (26 February)	Jennifer Hudson	3	Jack Bruley	"Ex-Factor"	Kit Rice	—N/a	—N/a	—N/a	—N/a
Episode 2 (26 February)	will.i.am	4	Michelle John	"Nowhere to Run"	Tim Gallagher	—N/a	✔	—N/a	—N/a
Episode 2 (26 February)	Tom Jones	5	Capital B	"I Wanna Be the Only One"	Ryhann Thomas	—N/a	—N/a	—N/a	—N/a
Episode 2 (26 February)	Jennifer Hudson	6	Georgie Braggins	"Something"	Liza Baker	—N/a	—N/a	—N/a	—N/a
Episode 2 (26 February)	Tom Jones	7	Craig Ward	"I'm Yours"	Septimus Prime	—N/a	—N/a	—N/a	—N/a
Episode 2 (26 February)	will.i.am	8	Jason Jones	"Long Train Runnin'"	Lawrence Hill	—N/a	—N/a	—N/a	—N/a
Episode 2 (26 February)	Tom Jones	9	Into The Ark	"More Than Words"	Linda Jennings	—N/a	—N/a	—N/a	—N/a
Episode 2 (26 February)	Gavin Rossdale	10	Sarah Morgan	"Young and Beautiful"	Ruth Lockwood	—N/a	—N/a	—N/a	—N/a

== Live knockouts ==
For the first time, the knockouts were recorded live, with the remaining six contestants in each team standing on stage together, stepping forward one by one to sing for 90 seconds. Emma Willis, the programme's presenter, commented, "The knockouts are live… Should I be saying this? I don't know if I should, It will be very immediate, when it's pre-recorded, they edit the show and put it out. This time it will be live so everything will be seen." First episode aired from 8.30pm until 9.45pm, second episode aired from 7.45pm until 9.00pm, third episode aired from 8.30 until 9.45pm and fourth and last aired from 7.45pm until 9.00pm.

In a new twist, viewers were able to vote for their favourite acts to go through to the live show, with each coach being able to save one act. Plus, each coach performed during the knockout rounds.

- Ep. 1 Musical guest: Sir Tom Jones ("You Can Leave Your Hat On")
- Ep. 2 Musical guest: Jennifer Hudson ("Remember Me")
- Ep. 3 Musical guest: Bush ('Mad Love')
- Ep. 4 Musical guest: will.i.am ("FIYAH")

Episode	Order	Coach	Artist	Song	Public vote %	Result
Episode 1 (4 March)	1	Jennifer Hudson	David Jackson	"A Little Respect"	11.07%	Eliminated
Episode 1 (4 March)	2	Jennifer Hudson	Jack Bruley	"To Love Somebody"	1.84%	Saved by Coach
Episode 1 (4 March)	3	Jennifer Hudson	Tim Gallagher	"Want to Want Me"	6.76%	Eliminated
Episode 1 (4 March)	4	Jennifer Hudson	Georgie Braggins	"I Say a Little Prayer"	10.13%	Eliminated
Episode 1 (4 March)	5	Jennifer Hudson	Mo Adeniran	"Freedom"	22.78%	Public's Vote
Episode 1 (4 March)	6	Jennifer Hudson	Jamie Miller	"Shape of You"	47.42%	Public's Vote
Episode 2 (5 March)	1	Tom Jones	Nadine McGhee	"Secret Love Song Pt. II"	15.71%	Saved by Coach
Episode 2 (5 March)	2	Tom Jones	Craig Ward	"Hold On Tight"	22.77%	Public's Vote
Episode 2 (5 March)	3	Tom Jones	Victoria Kerley	"Find Me"	16.95%	Eliminated
Episode 2 (5 March)	4	Tom Jones	Capital B	"One Day I'll Fly Away"	7.91%	Eliminated
Episode 2 (5 March)	5	Tom Jones	Dannii Barnes	"False Alarm"	4.04%	Eliminated
Episode 2 (5 March)	6	Tom Jones	Into The Ark	"Hold On, We're Going Home"	32.62%	Public's Vote
Episode 3 (11 March)	1	will.i.am	Tanya Lacey	"Changing"	17.59%	Saved by Coach
Episode 3 (11 March)	2	will.i.am	Hayley Eccles	"Need You Now"	8.03%	Eliminated
Episode 3 (11 March)	3	will.i.am	Jason Jones	"Into You"	18.78%	Public's Vote
Episode 3 (11 March)	4	will.i.am	Lia White	"Girls Just Want to Have Fun"	14.11%	Eliminated
Episode 3 (11 March)	5	will.i.am	Clara Hurtado	"Alarm"	13.32%	Eliminated
Episode 3 (11 March)	6	will.i.am	Michelle John	"I Can't Make You Love Me"	28.18%	Public's Vote
Episode 4 (12 March)	1	Gavin Rossdale	Diamond	"Wonder"	6.66%	Eliminated
Episode 4 (12 March)	2	Gavin Rossdale	Sarah Morgan	"I Will Always Love You"	21.84%	Public's Vote
Episode 4 (12 March)	3	Gavin Rossdale	Carter	"Sledgehammer"	16.98%	Eliminated
Episode 4 (12 March)	4	Gavin Rossdale	Truly Ford	"Million Reasons"	13.08%	Saved by Coach
Episode 4 (12 March)	5	Gavin Rossdale	Max Vickers	"I Bet You Look Good on the Dancefloor"	22.50%	Public's Vote
Episode 4 (12 March)	6	Gavin Rossdale	Keziah Rodell	"Trouble"	18.95%	Eliminated

== Live shows ==
The first live show was broadcast on 18 March 2017, with the second on 25 March, and the third and final live shows aired on 1 and 2 April 2017.

=== Results summary ===
Team's colour key
Team Will
Team JHud
Team Tom
Team Gavin

Result's colour key
Artist given 'Fast Pass' by their coach and did not face the public vote
Artist received the most public votes
Artist received the fewest votes and was eliminated

Weekly results per artist
Contestant	Week 1	Week 2	Week 3		
Contestant	Week 1	Week 2	Saturday	Sunday	
Contestant	Week 1	Week 2	Saturday	Round 1	Round 2
Mo Adeniran	Fast Pass	1st 24.10%	1st 44.11%	1st 48.67%	Winner; 61.80%
Into the Ark	Fast Pass	2nd 18.85%	2nd 25.29%	2nd 28.15%	Runner-up; 38.20%
Jamie Miller	1st 24.12%	3rd 15.45%	3rd 19.05%	3rd 23.18%	Eliminated (Week 3)
Michelle John	4th 13.37%	4th 11.09%	4th 11.55%	Eliminated (Week 3)	
Craig Ward	3rd 17.64%	5th 10.91%	Eliminated (Week 2)		
Max Vickers	2nd 22.39%	6th 10.88%	Eliminated (Week 2)		
Truly Ford	Fast Pass	7th 5.95%	Eliminated (Week 2)		
Jason Jones	Fast Pass	8th 2.78%	Eliminated (Week 2)		
Tanya Lacey	5th 7.71%	Eliminated (Week 1)			
Sarah Morgan	6th 7.56%	Eliminated (Week 1)			
Nadine McGhee	7th 5.63%	Eliminated (Week 1)			
Jack Bruley	8th 1.58%	Eliminated (Week 1)			

=== Live show details ===
==== Week 1: Quarter-final (18 March) ====
This episode aired from 8.30pm to 10.30pm.

- Musical guest: Clean Bandit & Zara Larsson ("Symphony")

Order	Coach	Artist	Song	Result
1	will.i.am	Tanya Lacey	"Good Luck"	Eliminated
2	will.i.am	Jason Jones	"I Feel It Coming"	Fast pass
3	will.i.am	Michelle John	"I'm Every Woman"	Advanced
4	Tom Jones	Craig Ward	"All These Things That I've Done"	Advanced
5	Tom Jones	Nadine McGhee	"A Different Corner"	Eliminated
6	Tom Jones	Into the Ark	"Jealous"	Fast pass
7	Gavin Rossdale	Max Vickers	"Lonely Boy"	Advanced
8	Gavin Rossdale	Truly Ford	"Lights"	Fast pass
9	Gavin Rossdale	Sarah Morgan	"Royals"	Eliminated
10	Jennifer Hudson	Jamie Miller	"Love on the Brain"	Advanced
11	Jennifer Hudson	Jack Bruley	"This Love"	Eliminated
12	Jennifer Hudson	Mo Adeniran	"Knockin' on Heaven's Door"	Fast pass

==== Week 2: Semi-final (25 March) ====
This episode aired from 8.30pm to 10:20pm. This marks the first time a female coach had more than one artist in the finale, as Jamie Miller and Mo Adeniran both come from Hudson's team. With the eliminations of Max Vickers and Truly Ford, Gavin Rossdale had no more artists.

- Musical guest: Jamiroquai ("Cloud 9")

Order	Coach	Artist	Song	Result
1	will.i.am	Jason Jones	"Use Somebody"	Eliminated
2	Gavin Rossdale	Max Vickers	"Boys Don't Cry"	Eliminated
3	will.i.am	Michelle John	"Get Here"	Advanced
4	Tom Jones	Craig Ward	"Castle on the Hill"	Eliminated
5	Gavin Rossdale	Truly Ford	"Elastic Heart"	Eliminated
6	Jennifer Hudson	Jamie Miller	"Stitches"	Advanced
7	Jennifer Hudson	Mo Adeniran	"Human"	Advanced
8	Tom Jones	Into The Ark	"Let It Be Me"	Advanced

==== Week 3: Final (1/2 April) ====
Saturday 1 April

This episode aired from 8:30pm to 10:20pm.

Group performance: The Voice UK coaches – "Freedom! '90"

- Musical guests: Pixie Lott & Anton Powers ("Baby")

Order	Coach	Artist	First song	Order	Duet (with Coach)	Result
1	Jennifer Hudson	Jamie Miller	"What Do You Mean?"	5	"Runnin'"	Advanced
2	Tom Jones	Into the Ark	"No One"	6	"Hold On, I'm Comin'"	Advanced
3	will.i.am	Michelle John	"Purple Rain"	8	"I Feel for You"	Eliminated
4	Jennifer Hudson	Mo Adeniran	"Don't You Worry Child"	7	"Beneath Your Beautiful"	Advanced

Sunday 2 April

This episode aired from 7:00pm to 8:00pm.

Musical guests: John Legend ("Surefire")

Order	Coach	Artist	First song	Order	Second song	Result
1	Jennifer Hudson	Jamie Miller	"Shape of You"	N/A	N/A (already eliminated)	Eliminated
2	Tom Jones	Into the Ark	"Hold On, We're Going Home"	4	"Not a One"	Runner-up
3	Jennifer Hudson	Mo Adeniran	"Iron Sky"	5	"Unsteady"	Winner

== Reception ==
=== Ratings ===
The series went "head-to-head" with the new BBC One talent show, Let It Shine, which premiered on 7 January, the same date as The Voice UK's premiere.

Episode	Date	Official ratings (in millions)	ITV weekly rank	Share	Source	Duration
Blind auditions 1	7 January	7.06	10	30.0%		95
Blind auditions 2	14 January	6.40	13	25.7%		90
Blind auditions 3	21 January	6.27	12	25.6%		90
Blind auditions 4	28 January	6.72	10	27.3%		90
Blind auditions 5	4 February	6.30	13	26.2%		90
Blind auditions 6	11 February	6.94	9	28.7%		80
Blind auditions 7	18 February	6.48	12	26.8%		80
Battle rounds 1	25 February	6.18	13	26.3%		120
Battle rounds 2	26 February	4.81	16	18.0%		120
Live knockouts 1	4 March	5.84	16	25.1%		75
Live knockouts 2	5 March	4.35	19	15.3%		75
Live knockouts 3	11 March	5.31	17	TBA	TBA	75
Live knockouts 4	12 March	4.02	19	TBA	TBA	75
Live show 1	18 March	4.97	16	TBA	TBA	120
Live show 2	25 March	4.59	17	TBA	TBA	110
Live final	1 April	4.95	16	TBA	TBA	110
Live final results	2 April	4.02	18	TBA	TBA	60
Series average	2017	5.60	14 (14.47)	TBA	—N/a	—N/a
The Winner's Story	16 April	TBA	TBA	TBA	TBA	60
