= Treorchy Male Choir =

Wales based men's choir

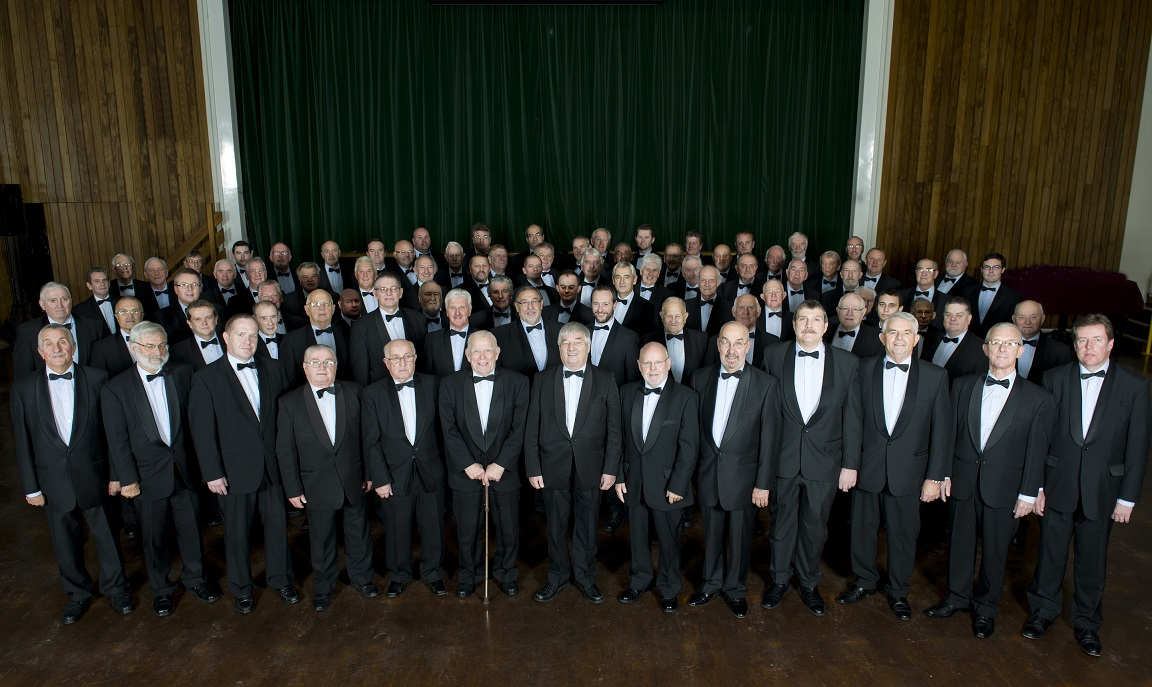
Members of the choir in 2013.

Treorchy Male Choir, also known as Treorchy Male Voice Choir, is a choir based in Treorchy in the Rhondda Valley, Wales, United Kingdom.

== History ==
Choirs have existed in the Rhondda Valley for more than a 150 years and Treorchy is one of the best known from the area. One of its first male choirs was formed in the Red Cow Hotel in the summer of 1883 and developed into a National Eisteddfod winner, culminating in a royal command performance for Queen Victoria at Windsor Castle in 1895. The choir would later disband after the South Wales Valleys suffered during the massive economic downturn of the Great Depression in the United Kingdom and two World Wars.

The present Treorchy Male Choir was reformed on October 16, 1946, under the baton of John Haydn Davies, who led the choir for 20 years. They reached musical distinction in the national Eisteddfod by gaining a record eight national wins, making a total of twenty-two first prizes out of twenty seven entries.

The Treorchy Male Choir is a registered charity. It has launched its own Junior Musician of the Year competition for children in the Rhondda area.

== Recordings ==
Treorchy was to become the first male choir to venture into the field of popular music and subsequently the choir has made more than fifty commercial recordings. Their popular music production include an album of music by Freddie Mercury and Queen and two recordings of music by Bob Marley, but they have also recorded more classical works and became the first British choir to perform Sibelius’ Kullervo Symphony in Finnish.

== Collaborations ==
The choir has performed together with various celebrities, in concerts, on recordings, and on television. Their collaborations include performances with Tom Jones, Ella Fitzgerald, Julie Andrews, Harry Secombe, Burt Bacharach, Shirley Bassey, Gwyneth Jones, Michael Ball, Katherine Jenkins, Iris Williams, Max Boyce, Bryn Terfel, Aled Jones, Charlotte Church, Ozzy Osbourne, Jon Bon Jovi, Cliff Richard, Andrea Bocelli, McFly, Russell Watson and Il Divo.

== Tours ==
Since the early 1980s the choir has undertaken a number of overseas tours beginning with two visits to Canada and a performance in Strasbourg Cathedral for its congregation of almost 6,000 people. A series of four tours of the USA followed, with visits to the White House and performances in San Francisco, Denver, Seattle and the Mid West. Treorchy has also enjoyed a close connection with Australia, becoming the first Welsh choir to appear at the Sydney Opera House in 1986. The choir has made two further visits to Australia appearing in Brisbane, Perth, Adelaide and Melbourne and also making a return to the Opera House in Sydney. In Britain, the choir has appeared on the Royal Variety Performance and has become a regular entertainer on the turf of the Millennium Stadium for various rugby union international games.
