= Mo Jamil =

Mo Adeniran
- Born: Mo Jamil Adeniran; 25 September 1995 (age 30); Warrington, Cheshire, England
- Genres: R&B, soul
- Occupation: Singer
- Instruments: Vocals
- Years active: 2017–present
- Label: Polydor (2017–2018)

Mo Jamil Adeniran (born 25 September 1995) is an English singer. He rose to fame after winning the sixth series of The Voice UK, where he won a recording contract with Polydor Records. His debut album, titled Evolve, charted at number 36 on the UK Albums Chart.

== Early life ==
Before auditioning for The Voice UK, Jamil was a hotel worker. He is from Warrington and is of Yoruba descent.

== Career ==
=== 2017: The Voice UK ===
Adeniran auditioned for The Voice UK, and joined Jennifer Hudson's team, after receiving a turn from each coach. He won his battle round against Diamond, and later went through to the live shows. He was automatically safe in the first two live shows, and was announced as the winner in the grand final on 2 April 2017.

==== Performances ====
Performed	Song	Original artist	Result
Blind Audition	"Iron Sky"	Paolo Nutini	All judges turned, joined team Jennifer
Battle Rounds	"A Change Is Gonna Come" (against Diamond)	Sam Cooke	Won Advanced to the live Knockouts
Live Knockouts	"Freedom"	Beyoncé featuring Kendrick Lamar	Saved by Public (2nd)
Quarter-final	"Knockin' on Heaven's Door"	Bob Dylan	Fast pass
Semi-final	"Human"	Rag'n'Bone Man	Saved by Public (1st)
Live final	"Don't You Worry Child"	Swedish House Mafia featuring John Martin	Saved by Public (1st)
Live final	"Beneath Your Beautiful" (with Jennifer Hudson)	Labrinth featuring Emeli Sandé	Saved by Public (1st)
Live final	"Iron Sky"	Paolo Nutini	Saved by Public (1st)
Live final	"Unsteady"	X Ambassadors	Winner

=== 2018–present: Evolve ===
On 30 March 2018 Jamil released his debut studio album, Evolve. The album peaked at 36 on the UK Albums Chart. Following this, Jamil was dropped from Polydor Records.

== Discography ==
=== Studio albums ===
Title	Details	Peak chart positions
Title	Details	UK
Evolve	Released: 30 March 2018; Label: Polydor; Formats: Digital download	36

=== Extended plays ===
Title	Details
Globetrotter	Released: 13 April 2017; Label: Polydor; Formats: Digital download

=== Singles ===
Title	Year	Peak chart positions	Album
Title	Year	UK	Album
"Unsteady"	2017	78	Evolve
"That Feeling"	2018	—	Evolve
"—" denotes a recording that did not chart or was not released in that territory.
