= Craig David discography =

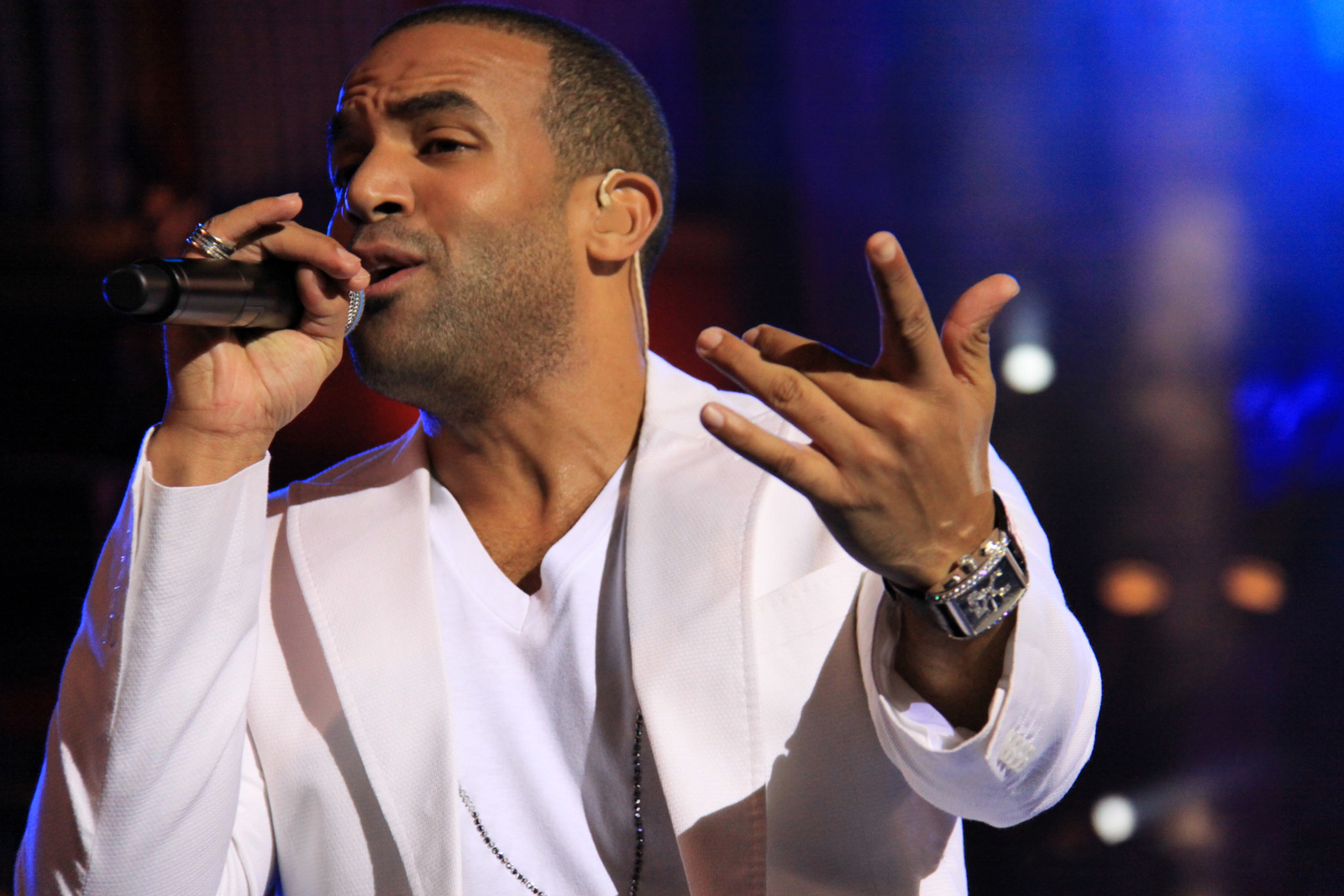
- David performing in Gran Canaria, 2009
- Studio albums: 9
- Compilation albums: 3
- Singles: 65
- Music videos: 42

English singer Craig David has released nine studio albums, three compilation albums and sixty-five singles. David's debut studio album, Born to Do It, was released in August 2000; it contained the singles "Fill Me In", "7 Days", "Walking Away" and "Rendezvous". The album reached the number 1 spot in 8 countries. In the United Kingdom, it sold 225,320 copies in its first week. In doing so, it became the fastest-selling debut album ever by a British male solo act, a record the album still holds. Born to Do It has since been listed as the 45th-fastest-selling album ever and went on to be certified 6× Platinum by the British Phonographic Industry (BPI) for shipments of 1.8 million copies. It went on to become the 35th-best-selling album of the decade in the United Kingdom. The album has sold more than 1.94 million copies in the UK as of April 2020. In 2002, David released his second studio album, Slicker Than Your Average, which produced six singles and, as of November 2013, November 2013, has sold more than 3.5 million copies worldwide. He followed this with the 2005 release of third album The Story Goes..., which sold more than 300,000 copies in the United Kingdom alone, reaching number 1 on the UK R&B Albums chart. David's fourth studio album was released in November 2007; Trust Me sold more than 100,000 copies in the United Kingdom, and peaked at number 8 on that country's main album chart. In 2008, David released his first Greatest Hits compilation; the album sold more than 60,000 copies.

David's next album, 2010's Signed Sealed Delivered saw a continued decline in commercial sales and chart placings – as of January 2016, the album had sold 33,779 copies in the United Kingdom.

After a five-year hiatus, David returned with his sixth studio album, Following My Intuition in 2016, seeing a return in success; the album debuted at number one on the UK Albums Chart, giving David his first number-one album since his debut, Born to Do It, reached the top spot in 2000. Following My Intuition produced seven singles: "Nothing Like This", "One More Time", "No Holding Back", "Ain't Giving Up", "Change My Love", "All We Needed", and "When the Bassline Drops" the latter of which, featuring Big Narstie, peaked at number 10 on the UK Singles Chart and, as of April 2025, has sold more than 600,000 copies in that country. David's seventh and eighth studio albums, The Time Is Now and 22, were released in 2018 and 2022, respectively, and charted in the top 10 albums chart in the United Kingdom.

Craig David's ninth studio album, Commitment, was released on 8 August 2025; it has been preceded by the singles "In Your Hands", "SOS", "Commitment", and "Wake Up".

== Albums ==
=== Studio albums ===
Title	Details	Peak chart positions										Sales	Certifications
Title	Details	UK	AUS	FRA	GER	IRE	ITA	NL	SWE	SWI	US	Sales	Certifications
Born to Do It	Released: 20 August 2000; Label: Wildstar (#CDWILD32); Formats: CD, cassette	1	2	5	3	1	7	1	1	6	11	UK: 1,860,000 (Note: Sales as of 2015)	BPI: 6× Platinum; ARIA: 4× Platinum; BVMI: Platinum; IFPI SWI: Platinum; RIAA: Platinum; SNEP: Platinum
Slicker Than Your Average	Released: 19 November 2002; Label: Wildstar (#CDWILD42); Formats: CD	4	5	6	16	27	11	19	26	6	32		BPI: 2× Platinum; ARIA: 2× Platinum; BVMI: Gold; IFPI SWI: Gold; RIAA: Gold; SNEP: Gold
The Story Goes...	Released: 6 September 2005; Label: Warner Bros. (#2564625222); Formats: CD, digital download	5	9	5	13	45	5	6	11	3	—		BPI: Platinum; SNEP: Gold
Trust Me	Released: 12 November 2007; Label: Warner Bros. (#2564697131); Formats: CD, digital download	18	59	18	62	76	19	37	53	16	—		BPI: Gold
Signed Sealed Delivered	Released: 29 March 2010; Label: Universal Motown (#2733585); Formats: CD, digital download	13	24	—	—	—	56	93	—	93	—		
Following My Intuition	Released: 30 September 2016; Label: Sony; Formats: CD, digital download	1	29	124	85	—	70	62	—	43	—	UK: 114,400 (Note: Sales as of 2017)	BPI: Gold
The Time Is Now	Released: 26 January 2018; Label: Sony; Formats: CD, digital download	2	43	157	97	53	—	56	—	75	—		BPI: Silver
22	Released: 30 September 2022; Label: TS5, Moor Records; Formats: CD, digital download	7	— (Note: "22" did not enter the main Australian albums chart, but peaked at number 9 on the Australian Digital Albums Chart, and at number 86 on the Australian Physical Albums chart.)	—	—	—	—	—	—	—	—		
Commitment	Released: 8 August 2025; Label: Believe Music; Formats: CD, digital download	10	—	—	—	—	—	—	—	—	—		
"—" denotes an album that did not chart or was not released in that territory.

=== Compilation albums ===
Title	Details	Peak chart positions		Sales	Certifications
Title	Details	UK	ITA	Sales	Certifications
Remixes & Live	Released: 2001; Label: M6 interactions; Formats: CD	—	—		
Greatest Hits	Released: 24 November 2008; Label: Warner Bros. (#8256462978); Formats: CD, digital download	28	45	UK: 34,697 (Note: Sales of 2016)	BPI: Silver
Rewind – The Collection	Released: 3 March 2017; Label: Sony; Formats: Digital download	—	—		BPI: Gold
"—" denotes an album that did not chart or was not released in that territory.

== Singles ==
=== As lead artist ===
Title	Year	Peak chart positions										Certifications	Album
Title	Year	UK	AUS	FRA	GER	IRE	ITA	NL	SWE	SWI	US	Certifications	Album
"Fill Me In"	2000	1	6	34	37	7	29	8	28	45	15	BPI: 2× Platinum; ARIA: Platinum; RMNZ: Gold	Born to Do It
"7 Days"	2000	1	4	19	22	3	9	7	21	20	10	BPI: 3× Platinum; ARIA: Platinum; BVMI: Gold; RMNZ: 3× Platinum; SNEP: Gold	Born to Do It
"Walking Away"	2000	3	5	22	46	9	14	11	13	24	44	BPI: Platinum; ARIA: Platinum; RMNZ: Gold	Born to Do It
"Rendezvous"	2001	8	28	61	86	29	49	56	—	74	—	BPI: Silver	Born to Do It
"What's Your Flava?"	2002	8	10	20	35	22	12	12	31	13	— (Note: "What's Your Flava?" did not enter the Billboard Hot 100, but peaked at number four on the Bubbling Under Hot 100 chart.)	ARIA: Platinum	Slicker Than Your; Average
"Hidden Agenda"	2003	10	24	70	65	32	20	43	49	50	— (Note: "Hidden Agenda" did not enter the Billboard Hot 100, but peaked at number 19 on the Bubbling Under Hot 100 Singles chart.)		Slicker Than Your; Average
"Rise & Fall" (featuring Sting)	2003	2	6	15	15	5	9	7	35	11	—	ARIA: Gold	Slicker Than Your; Average
"Spanish"	2003	8	60	—	—	31	—	83	—	39	—		Slicker Than Your; Average
"World Filled with Love"	2003	15	32	83	94	—	—	—	—	40	—		Slicker Than Your; Average
"You Don't Miss Your Water ('Til the Well Runs Dry)"	2004	43	—	—	—	—	—	—	—	—	—		Slicker Than Your; Average
"All the Way"	2005	3	31	23	38	27	12	47	33	18	—		The Story Goes...
"Don't Love You No More (I'm Sorry)"	2005	4	72	45	65	30	35	—	—	35	—	BPI: Silver	The Story Goes...
"Unbelievable"	2006	18	—	—	—	46	—	—	—	—	—		The Story Goes...
"Hot Stuff (Let's Dance)"	2007	7	29	15	37	19	18	47	10	11	—		Trust Me
"6 of 1 Thing"	2008	39	—	—	—	—	—	—	—	—	—		Trust Me
"Officially Yours"	2008	158	—	—	—	—	—	—	—	—	—		Trust Me
"Where's Your Love" (featuring Rita Ora and Tinchy Stryder)	2008	58	—	—	—	—	—	—	—	—	—		Greatest Hits
"Insomnia"	2008	43	89	—	—	—	—	81	—	84	—		Greatest Hits
"Are You Up for This"	2008	—	—	—	—	—	—	—	—	—	—		Non-album single
"One More Lie (Standing in the Shadows)"	2010	76	—	—	—	—	—	—	—	—	—		Signed Sealed Delivered
"All Alone Tonight (Stop, Look, Listen)"	2010	—	—	—	—	—	—	—	—	—	—		Signed Sealed Delivered
"When the Bassline Drops" (with Big Narstie)	2015	10	74	—	—	61	—	—	—	—	—	BPI: Platinum	Following My Intuition
"Who Am I" (with Katy B and Major Lazer)	2016	89	—	—	—	—	—	—	—	—	—		Honey
"Nothing Like This" (with Blonde)	2016	15	71	—	—	34	—	—	93	—	—	BPI: Platinum	Following My Intuition
"One More Time"	2016	30	—	—	—	92	—	—	—	—	—	BPI: Silver	Following My Intuition
"Ain't Giving Up" (Note: "Ain't Giving Up" also features on Sigala's debut studio album, Brighter Days.) (with Sigala)	2016	23	—	—	—	57	—	—	—	—	—	BPI: Gold	Following My Intuition
"Change My Love"	2016	— (Note: "Change My Love" did not enter the UK Singles Chart, but peaked at number 55 on the UK Singles Downloads and Sales charts, and at number 32 on the UK Hip Hop and R&B Singles Chart.)	—	—	—	—	—	—	—	—	—		Following My Intuition
"All We Needed"	2016	42	—	—	—	—	—	—	—	—	—		Following My Intuition
"Heartline"	2017	24	—	—	—	85	—	—	—	—	—	BPI: Gold	The Time Is Now
"I Know You" (featuring Bastille)	2017	5	—	—	92	30	—	—	—	65	—	BPI: Platinum	The Time Is Now
"Magic" (featuring Yxng Bane)	2018	—	—	—	—	—	—	—	—	—	—		The Time Is Now
"When You Know What Love Is"	2019	52	—	—	—	—	—	—	—	—	—		Non-album singles
"Do You Miss Me Much"	2019	— (Note: "Do You Miss Me Much" did not enter the UK Singles Chart, but debuted and peaked at number 47 on the UK Singles Downloads Chart, and at number 48 on the UK Singles Sales Chart.)	—	—	—	—	—	—	—	—	—		Non-album singles
"Who You Are" (with MNEK)	2021	39	—	—	—	85	—	—	—	—	—	BPI: Silver	22
"My Heart's Been Waiting for You" (featuring Duvall)	2022	—	—	—	—	—	—	—	—	—	—		22
"G Love" (featuring Nippa)	2022	—	—	—	—	—	—	—	—	—	—		22
"DNA" (with Galantis)	2022	—	—	—	—	—	—	—	—	—	—		22
"Have Yourself a Merry Little Christmas"	2022	—	—	—	—	—	—	—	—	—	—		Non-album single
"In Your Hands"	2024	—	—	—	—	—	—	—	—	—	—		Commitment
"SOS"	2025	— (Note: "SOS" did not enter the UK Singles Chart, but peaked at number 88 on the UK Singles Downloads Chart and at number 91 on the UK Singles Sales Chart.)	—	—	—	—	—	—	—	—	—		Commitment
"Commitment" (with Tiwa Savage)	2025	— (Note: "Commitment" did not enter the UK Singles Chart, but peaked at number 51 on the UK Singles Downloads Chart and at number 53 on the UK Singles Sales Chart.)	—	—	—	—	—	—	—	—	—		Commitment
"Wake Up"	2025	—	—	—	—	—	—	—	—	—	—		Commitment
"In It with You" (with JoJo)	2025	—	—	—	—	—	—	—	—	—			Commitment
"Rain"	2025	—	—	—	—	—	—	—	—	—			Commitment
"—" denotes a single that did not chart or was not released in that territory.

=== As featured artist ===
Title	Year	Peak chart positions									Certifications	Album
Title	Year	UK	AUS	FRA	GER	IRE	ITA	NL	SWE	SWI	Certifications	Album
"Something" (Fagin featuring Craig David) (Note: Uncredited collaboration)	1997	—	—	—	—	—	—	—	—	—		Non-album single
"What Ya Gonna Do" (Artful Dodger featuring Craig David)	1998	—	—	—	—	—	—	—	—	—		It's All About the Stragglers
"Re-Rewind (The Crowd Say Bo Selecta)" (Artful Dodger featuring Craig David)	1999	2	62	—	49	15	18	4	53	88	BPI: Platinum	It's All About the Stragglers
"Woman Trouble" (Artful Dodger featuring Craig David and Robbie Craig)	2000	6	68	—	95	31	—	63	—	98	BPI: Silver	It's All About the Stragglers
"This Is the Girl" (Kano featuring Craig David)	2007	18	—	—	—	—	—	—	—	—		London Town
"Fed Up" (Bonnie Pink featuring Craig David)	2009	—	—	—	—	—	—	—	—	—		One
"Do It on My Own" (Remady featuring Craig David)	2010	—	—	12	—	—	—	—	—	28		No Superstar
"Sex in the Bathroom" (Timati featuring Craig David)	2012	—	—	—	—	—	—	—	—	—		Swagg
"Bits 'n Pieces" (Dim Chris featuring Craig David and Rosette)	2012	—	—	—	—	—	—	—	—	—		Non-album singles
"Our Love" (Stereo Palma featuring Craig David)	2012	—	—	—	—	—	—	—	—	—		Non-album singles
"Addicted" (DJ Assad featuring Mohombi / Craig David / Greg Parys)	2012	—	—	97	—	—	—	—	—	—		Non-album singles
"Discoball" (Kaya featuring Craig David)	2013	—	—	—	—	—	—	—	—	—		Non-album singles
"No Holding Back" (Hardwell featuring Craig David)	2016	—	—	—	—	—	—	—	—	—		Following My Intuition
"Bang Bang" (DJ Fresh and Diplo featuring R. City, Selah Sue and Craig David)	2016	—	—	—	—	—	—	—	—	—		Non-album singles
"Bridge over Troubled Water" (as part of Artists for Grenfell)	2017	1	53	111	—	25	—	—	—	90	BPI: Gold	Non-album singles
"Intimate" (Yungen featuring Craig David)	2018	—	—	—	—	—	—	—	—	—		Non-album singles
"Sober" (Nile Rodgers & Chic featuring Craig David and Stefflon Don)	2018	—	—	—	—	—	—	—	—	—		It's About Time
"No Drama" (James Hype featuring Craig David)	2018	24	—	—	—	—	—	—	—	—	BPI: Gold	Non-album single
"Sunshine" (Big Narstie featuring Craig David and Star.One)	2018	—	—	—	—	—	—	—	—	—		BDL Bipolar
"Really Love" (KSI featuring Craig David and Digital Farm Animals)	2020	3	—	—	—	18	—	—	—	—	BPI: Platinum	All Over the Place
"It's All Love" (Toddla T featuring Craig David)	2022	—	—	—	—	—	—	—	—	—		Steeze Factory, Vol. 1 – EP
"Abracadabra" (Wes Nelson featuring Craig David)	2024	37	—	—	—	55	—	—	—	—		Non-album single
"—" denotes a single that did not chart or was not released in that territory.

== Other charted songs ==
Title	Year	Peak chart positions	Album
Title	Year	UK	Album
"16"	2016	64	Following My Intuition

== Guest appearances ==
Title	Year	Other artist(s)	Album
"No More"	2000	Guru	Guru's Jazzmatazz, Vol. 3: Streetsoul
"What You Gonna Do?"	2000	Artful Dodger	It's All About the Stragglers
"Bad Boy"	2007	Kano	London Town
"My First Love"	2008	None	Sex and the City
"Everways"	2009	Ali Campbell	Flying High
"Stuck in the Middle"	2009	Jay Sean	All or Nothing
"Fly Away"	2011	In The Screen Rony Seikaly	Subliminal Invasion
"Get Drunk Up"	2011	Erick Morillo	Non-album singles
"Freak on the Dancefloor"	2011	Blackout Mode	Non-album singles
"Good Time"	2012	Calvin Harris	Non-album singles
"Never Too Late"	2013	Slava	Odinochestvo
"Got It Good"	2016	Kaytranada	99.9%
"Reload"	2017	Chase & Status	Tribe
"You Don't Know Me"	2017	Pete Tong Jules Buckley The Heritage Orchestra	Ibiza Classics
"I Know"	2018	Big Zuu	Content with Content
"Come Alive"	2018	None	The Greatest Showman: Reimagined
"We Were Just Kids"	2018	Clean Bandit Kirsten Joy	What Is Love?
"Would I Lie To You?"	2018	Other People's Heartache & Bastille Kianja S-X	Other People's Heartache, Pt. 4
"Don't Let Go (Love)"	2018	Other People's Heartache & Bastille Kianja Swarmz	Other People's Heartache, Pt. 4
"Different Wave"	2021	Deno	Boy Meets World

== Music videos ==
=== As lead artist ===
Title	Year	Other artist(s)	Director(s)	Ref.
"Re-Rewind (The Crowd Say Bo Selecta)"	1999	Artful Dodger	Chris Vincze	
"Fill Me In"	2000	None	Max & Dania	
"Woman Trouble"	2000	Artful Dodger	Unknown	
"7 Days"	2000	None	Max & Dania	
"Walking Away"	2000	None	Max & Dania	
"Rendezvous"	2001	None	Max & Dania	
"Fill Me In" (US version)	2001	None	Darren Grant	
"Walking Away" (US version)	2001	None	Lenny Bass	
"What's Your Flava?"	2002	None	Little X	
"Hidden Agenda"	2003	None	Calabazitaz	
"Rise & Fall"	2003	Sting	Max & Dania	
"Rise & Fall" (studio version)	2003	Sting	Simon Poontip	
"Spanish"	2003	None	Calabazitaz	
"Personal" (Note: Unreleased)	2003	None	Calabazitaz	
"World Filled with Love"	2003	None	Calabazitaz	
"All the Way"	2005	None	Max & Dania	
"Don't Love You No More (I'm Sorry)"	2005	None	Robert Hales	
"Unbelievable"	2006	None	Robert Hales	
"This Is the Girl"	2007	Kano	Paul Minor	
"Hot Stuff (Let's Dance)"	2007	None	Justin Francis	
"6 of 1 Thing"	2008	None	Phil Griffin	
"Officially Yours"	2008	None	Barnaby Roper	
"Where's Your Love"	2008	Tinchy Stryder Rita Ora (Note: Uncredited collaboration)	Steve Kemsley	
"Insomnia"	2008	None	Sarah Chatfield	
"Walking Away" (Italian version)	2008	Nek	Unknown	
"Walking Away" (German version)	2008	Monrose	Unknown	
"Walking Away" (French version)	2008	Lynnsha	Unknown	
"Walking Away" (Spanish version)	2008	Alex Ubago	Unknown	
"One More Lie (Standing in the Shadows)"	2010	None	Dale "Rage" Resteghini	
"All Alone Tonight (Stop, Look, Listen)"	2010	None	Unknown	
"Do It on My Own"	2010	Remady	Unknown	
"Sex in the Bathroom"	2012	Timati	Pavel Hoodyakov	
"Bits N Pieces"	2012	Dim Chris Rosette	Unknown	
"Addicted"	2012	DJ Assad Mohombi Greg Parys	Adelio Menegatti	
"Our Love"	2013	Stereo Palma	Unknown	
"When the Bassline Drops"	2015	Big Narstie	Craig David	
"Who Am I"	2016	Katy B Major Lazer	Jeremy Rall	
"One More Time"	2016	None	Unknown	
"Ain't Giving Up"	2016	Sigala	Unknown	
"All We Needed"	2016	None	Unknown	
"Change My Love"	2016	None	Unknown	
"No Holding Back"	2016	Hardwell	Unknown	
"Nothing Like This"	2016	Blonde	Unknown	
"Bang Bang"	2017	DJ Fresh Diplo R. City Selah Sue	Dominic O'Riordan	
"Bridge over Troubled Water"	2017	Artists for Grenfell	Unknown	
"Heartline"	2017	None	Alex Southam	
"I Know You"	2017	Bastille	Alex Southam	
"Intimate"	2018	Yungen	Unknown	
"Sober"	2018	Nile Rodgers Chic Stefflon Don	Giorgio Testi	
"No Drama"	2018	James Hype	Max & Dania	
"Magic"	2018	Yxng Bane	Unknown	
"When You Know What Love Is"	2019	None	Charlie Sarsfield	
"Do You Miss Me Much"	2019	None	Gavin Williams	
"Really Love"	2020	KSI Digital Farm Animals	Unknown	
"Who You Are"	2021	MNEK	Samuel Douek	
"It's All Love"	2022	Toddla T	Unknown	
"My Heart's Been Waiting for You"	2022	Duvall	Unknown	
"G Love"	2022	Nippa	Ben Smith	
"DNA"	2022	Galantis	Unknown	
"In Your Hands"	2024	None	Lx	
"SOS"	2025	None	MFB	
"Commitment"	2025	None	MFB	
"In It with You"	2025	JoJo	Unknown	
"Rain"	2025	None	Mauro Fernandes Borges	

=== Guest appearances ===
Year	Title	Artist	Director(s)	Ref.
2014	"Imagine" (UNICEF: World version)	Various	Michael Jurkovac	
