= Greatest Hits (Craig David album) =

Greatest hits album by Craig David
- Released: 24 November 2008
- Recorded: 2000–2008
- Genre: 2-step garage; hip-hop; R&B
- Length: 61:27 (standard edition); 79:02 (deluxe edition)
- Label: Warner Bros.; Sire
- Producer: Mark Hill; Soulshock and Karlin; Jim Beanz; Marshall & Trell; Fraser T Smith; Brian Rawling; Paul Meehan

Craig David chronology
Trust Me (2007)	Greatest Hits (2008)	Signed Sealed Delivered (2010)

Singles from Greatest Hits
- 1. "Where's Your Love" Released: 10 November 2008 (UK and Ireland only); 2. "Insomnia" Released: 17 November 2008

Greatest Hits is Craig David's first greatest hits album and was released on 24 November 2008. It contains three new songs, "Where's Your Love", "Insomnia" and "Just My Imagination" (unrelated to the track on his 2010 album). "Officially Yours" and "Unbelievable" are the only two singles previously released by David not to feature on the album.

The album peaked at number 48 in the UK, thus becoming David's lowest-charting album to date. It received a Silver certification from the BPI. In 2016, after the release of Following My Intuition, it rose to a new peak of number 28 after entering the top 40 for the first time.

== Reception ==
Professional ratings
Review scores
Source	Rating
AllMusic	3.5/5 stars
BBC Music	(positive)
musicOMH	3/5 stars

BBC Music said of the album:

Serving as a reminder to the songs Craig had in the early 2000s (decade), this Greatest Hits is at very least a fun listen. Craig David was a great pop star, who simply needs to take some time to rediscover his love of music and win back the hearts of the nation.

== Track listing ==
- "Rendezvous", "Spanish", "World Filled with Love" and "This Is the Girl" are omitted from the single-disc version of the album.

Disc one (CD)
No.	Title	Writer(s)	Producer(s)	Length
1.	"Fill Me In" (from Born to Do It, 2000)	Craig David; Mark Hill	Mark Hill	4:16
2.	"7 Days" (from Born to Do It)	David; Hill	Mark Hill	3:55
3.	"Rise & Fall" (featuring Sting) (from Slicker Than Your Average, 2002)	David; Dominic Miller; Gordon Sumner	Soulshock and Karlin	4:47
4.	"Insomnia" (previously unreleased)	David; Jim Beanz	Jim Beanz	3:25
5.	"What's Your Flava?" (from Slicker Than Your Average)	David; Anthony Marshall; Trevor Henry	Marshall & Trell	3:36
6.	"Walking Away" (from Born to Do It)	David; Hill	Mark Hill	3:25
7.	"Where's Your Love" (featuring Tinchy Stryder and Rita Ora) (previously unreleased)	David; Fraser T Smith; June Hamm; Stephen Emmanuel; Kwasi Danquah III	Fraser T Smith	3:35
8.	"You Don't Miss Your Water ('Til the Well Runs Dry)" (from Slicker Than Your Average)	David; Hill	Mark Hill	5:20
9.	"Rendezvous" (from Born to Do It)	David; Hill	Mark Hill	4:37
10.	"Spanish" (featuring Duke One) (from Slicker Than Your Average)	David; Marshall; Henry	Marshall & Trell	5:03
11.	"All the Way" (from The Story Goes..., 2005)	David; Hill	Mark Hill	3:55
12.	"Just My Imagination" (previously unreleased)	David; Wayne Hector	Brian Rawling; Paul Meehan	4:17
13.	"World Filled with Love" (from Slicker Than Your Average)	David; Smith	Fraser T Smith	3:44
14.	"Don't Love You No More (I'm Sorry)" (from The Story Goes...)	David; Hill	Mark Hill	4:04
15.	"6 of 1 Thing" (from Trust Me, 2007)	David; Smith	Fraser T Smith	3:47
16.	"Hidden Agenda" (from Slicker Than Your Average)	David; Hill	Mark Hill	3:54
17.	"This Is the Girl" (with Kano) (from Trust Me)	David; Smith; Kane Robinson	Fraser T Smith	4:11
18.	"Rewind" (from Born to Do It)	David; Hill	Mark Hill	5:32
19.	"Hot Stuff (Let's Dance)" (from Trust Me)	David; Smith	Fraser T Smith	3:39
Total length:				79:02

- Disc two (DVD)
1. "Fill Me In"
2. "7 Days"
3. "Walking Away"
4. "What's Your Flava?"
5. "Rise & Fall" (featuring Sting)
6. "All the Way"
7. "Don't Love You No More (I'm Sorry)"
8. "This Is the Girl" (Kano featuring Craig David)
9. "Hot Stuff (Let's Dance)"
10. "Where's Your Love" (featuring Tinchy Stryder and Rita Ora)

== Personnel ==
Credits adapted from album's liner notes.

- Omar Adimora – mixing (track 7)
- Jim Beanz – producer, engineer, and mixing (track 4)
- Craig David – vocals (all tracks), producer (tracks 7, 13, 17)
- Steve Fitzmaurice – mixing (track 1, 6, 13)
- Matt Furmidge – mixing (track 12)
- Trevor "Trell" Henry – producer, mixing, and rap (track 5)
- Mark Hill – producer (tracks 1, 2, 6, 8, 9, 11, 14, 16, 18), mixing (tracks 2, 9, 18), additional vocals (track 9)
- Kano – producer and vocals (track 17)
- Kenneth Karlin – producer (track 3)
- Koil – engineer and mixing (track 4)
- Tim Liken – mixing (track 7)
- Manny Marroquin – mixing (track 3)
- Anthony Marshall – producer and mixing (tracks 5, 11)
- Paul Meehan – producer (track 12)
- Brian Rawling – producer (track 12)
- Rita Ora – vocals (track 7)
- Fraser T Smith – producer (tracks 7, 13, 15, 17, 19), mixing (track 15, 19)
- Soulshock – producer and mixing (track 3)
- Mark "Spike" Stent – mixing (tracks 8, 11, 14, 16, 17)
- Sting – vocals (track 3)
- Tinchy Stryder – vocals (track 7)
- Martin Terefe – producer (track 15)

== Charts ==
=== Weekly charts ===
Weekly chart performance for Greatest Hits
Chart (2008–2016)	Peak position
Belgian Albums (Ultratop Flanders)	8
Belgian Albums (Ultratop Wallonia)	28
Italian Albums (FIMI)	45
Japanese Albums (Oricon)	28
Scottish Albums (OCC)	59
Spanish Albums (Promusicae)	24
UK Albums (OCC)	28
UK R&B Albums (OCC)	3

=== Year-end charts ===
Year-end chart performance for Greatest Hits
Chart (2009)	Position
Belgian Albums (Ultratop Flanders)	62

== Certifications ==
Certifications of Greatest Hits, with sales where available
Region	Certification	Certified units/sales
United Kingdom (BPI)	Silver	60,000^{‡}
^{‡} Sales+streaming figures based on certification alone.

== Release history ==
Greatest Hits release history
Region	Date	Format	Label	Ref(s)
Worldwide	14 November 2008	Digital download	Teacup	
United Kingdom	24 November 2008	CD + DVD (Deluxe)	Sire	
Europe	24 November 2008	CD (Standard)	Warner Bros.	
Japan	26 November 2008	CD (Standard)	Warner Bros. Japan	
Germany	28 November 2009	CD (Standard)	Warner Bros.	
Australia	29 November 2008	CD + DVD (Deluxe)	Warner Bros.	
United States	2 December 2009	CD; digital download (Standard)	Warner Bros.	
