= MTV Video Music Award Japan for Best R&B Video =

Annual Japanese music award

The MTV Video Music Award Japan for Best R&B Video (Japanese:最優秀R&Bビデオ賞) has been given annually since 2002. Namie Amuro has won it four times. She first won it in 2004.

== Results ==
The following table displays the nominees and the winners in bold print with a yellow background.

=== 2000s ===
Year	Artist	Video
**2002** (1st)	**Hikaru Utada**	
**2002** (1st)	Mary J. Blige	
**2002** (1st)	Crystal Kay	
**2002** (1st)	Alicia Keys	
**2002** (1st)	Usher	
**2003** (2nd)	**Crystal Kay**	**"Girl U Love"**
**2003** (2nd)	Ashanti	"Foolish"
**2003** (2nd)	Chemistry	"My Gift to You"
**2003** (2nd)	Craig David	"What's Your Flava?"
**2003** (2nd)	TLC	"Girl Talk"
**2004** (3rd)	**Namie Amuro**	**"Put 'Em Up"**
**2004** (3rd)	Mary J. Blige featuring Method Man	"Love @ 1st Sight"
**2004** (3rd)	Double	"Destiny"
**2004** (3rd)	Crystal Kay	"Candy"
**2004** (3rd)	Alicia Keys	"You Don't Know My Name"
**2005** (4th)	**Namie Amuro**	**"Girl Talk"**
**2005** (4th)	AI	"E.O."
**2005** (4th)	Crystal Kay	"Kiss"
**2005** (4th)	Alicia Keys	"If I Ain't Got You"
**2005** (4th)	Usher	"Burn"
**2006** (5th)	**AI**	**"Story"**
**2006** (5th)	Mariah Carey	"We Belong Together"
**2006** (5th)	Craig David	"All the Way"
**2006** (5th)	Destiny's Child	"Stand Up for Love"
**2006** (5th)	Crystal Kay	"Kirakuni"
**2007** (6th)	**AI**	**"Believe"**
**2007** (6th)	Ciara	"Promise"
**2007** (6th)	Miliyah Kato	"Kono Mama Zutto Asa Made" (このままずっと朝まで)
**2007** (6th)	John Legend	"Save Room"
**2007** (6th)	Ne-Yo	"So Sick"
**2008** (7th)	**Namie Amuro**	**"Hide & Seek"**
**2008** (7th)	AI	"I'll Remember You"
**2008** (7th)	Mary J. Blige featuring Lil Mama	"Just Fine"
**2008** (7th)	Chris Brown featuring T-Pain	"Kiss Kiss"
**2008** (7th)	Miliyah Kato featuring Wakadanna	"Lalala"
**2009** (8th)	**Namie Amuro**	**"Sexy Girl"**
**2009** (8th)	Akon	"Right Now (Na Na Na)"
**2009** (8th)	Juju featuring Spontania	"Sunao ni Naretara" (素直になれたら)
**2009** (8th)	Miliyah Kato	"19 Memories"
**2009** (8th)	Ne-Yo	"Miss Independent"

=== 2010s ===
Year	Artist	Video
**2010** (9th)	**Miliyah Kato**	**"Aitai"**
**2010** (9th)	Chris Brown	"Crawl"
**2010** (9th)	Jasmine	"Sad to Say"
**2010** (9th)	Juju with Jay'ed	"Ashita ga Kuru Nara" (明日がくるなら)
**2010** (9th)	Alicia Keys	"Doesn't Mean Anything"
**2011** (10th)	**Rihanna**	**"Only Girl (In the World)"**
**2011** (10th)	Ai	"Nemurenai Machi" (眠れない街)
**2011** (10th)	Miliyah Kato	"X.O.X.O."
**2011** (10th)	Ne-Yo	"Champagne Life"
**2011** (10th)	Usher featuring will.i.am	"OMG"
**2012** (11th)	**Miliyah Kato**	**"Yūsha-Tachi" (勇者たち)**
**2012** (11th)	Ai	"Independent Woman"
**2012** (11th)	Amy Winehouse	"Our Day Will Come"
**2012** (11th)	Jason Derülo	"It Girl"
**2012** (11th)	Mayer Hawthorne	"The Walk"
**2013** (12th)	Alicia Keys featuring Nicki Minaj	"Girl on Fire"
**2013** (12th)	Namie Amuro	"In The Spotlight (Tokyo)"
**2013** (12th)	Frank Ocean	"Pyramids"
**2013** (12th)	Miliyah Kato featuring Wakadanna	"Lovers Part II"
**2013** (12th)	Rihanna	"Diamonds"

== See also ==
- MTV Video Music Award for Best R&B Video
- MTV Europe Music Award for Best R&B
