= Unbelievable (Craig David song) =

2006 single by Craig David

Single by Craig David

from the album The Story Goes...
- Released: 6 March 2006
- Length: 3:18
- Label: Warner Bros.
- Songwriter(s): Craig David; Mark Taylor; Paul Barry
- Producer(s): Mark Taylor

Craig David singles chronology
"Don't Love You No More (I'm Sorry)" (2005)	"Unbelievable" (2006)	"This Is the Girl" (2007)

Music video
- "Unbelievable" on YouTube

"Unbelievable" is a song by British singer Craig David. It was written by David, Mark Taylor, and Paul Barry for his third studio album, The Story Goes... (2005). The third single from the album, it was rumoured to be a double A-side of fan-favourites, "Hypnotic" and "Johnny"; however, it was "Unbelievable" that was chosen. It became one of David's smallest hits to date, peaking at number 18 in the UK. The disappointing performance of the song in the UK, where the first two singles charted in the top five, led "Unbelievable" to be the final single from The Story Goes.... The song was slightly remixed for the single release.

== Chart performance ==
"Unbelievable" charted at number eighteen on the UK Singles Chart, spending five weeks within the UK top 75. It remains his second-lowest charting peak, with only "You Don't Miss Your Water ('Til the Well Runs Dry)" charting lower. David's collaboration with Kano also charted at eighteen but had a longer chart run. It did not chart elsewhere.

== Music video ==
The music video was directed by Robert Hales.

== Track listing ==
UK CD1
No.	Title	Writer(s)	Producer(s)	Length
1.	"Unbelievable" (Radio Edit)	Craig David; Mark Taylor; Paul Barry	Taylor	3:18
2.	"Rise & Fall" (Live in Seoul, September 2005)	Craig David; Gordon Sumner; Dominic Miller	Soulshock and Karlin	4:44

UK CD2
No.	Title	Writer(s)	Producer(s)	Length
1.	"Unbelievable" (Radio Edit)	David; Taylor; Barry	Taylor	3:18
2.	"Unbelievable" (Metro Mix)	David; Taylor; Barry	Taylor; Metro^{[a]}	3:49
3.	"Unbelievable" (Dcypha Remix)	David; Taylor; Barry	Taylor; Dcypha Productions^{[a]}	3:20
4.	"Unbelievable" (Video)			3:30

Notes

- ^{^[a]} signifies an additional producer

== Charts ==
Chart performance for "Unbelievable"
Chart (2006)	Peak position
Ireland (IRMA)	46
Scotland (OCC)	19
UK Singles (OCC)	18
UK Hip Hop/R&B (OCC)	6

== Release history ==
Release history and formats for "Unbelievable"
Region	Date	Format(s)	Label	Ref.
United Kingdom	6 March 2006	CD single; digital download	Warner Bros. Records	
