= Flavas =

American line of fashion dolls

- Type: Fashion doll
- Company: Mattel
- Country: United States
- Availability: 2003–2004
- Slogan: What's Your Flava?

Flavas is an American line of fashion dolls created by Mattel in 2003. They are multiethnic and have an urban, hip hop style with "bling-bling" jewellery and stick-on tattoos, described as "ghetto-fabulous" by Newsweek. They were designed to appeal to tweens (8- to 12-year-olds) and compete with the widely successful Bratz dolls. They were marketed as "reality-based" and "authentic" and have more points of articulation than traditional fashion dolls for more expressive posing.

Upon release, Flavas were poorly received and were criticized for being stereotypical, bad role models, and a misrepresentation of hip hop culture. Their multiculturalism was described as positive, and British analysts expected their "risqué nature" to translate to high sales. However, following sales that were described as "disastrous", they were discontinued within a year.

== Doll design ==
The lineup of Flavas dolls from 2003

The six Flavas dolls, Kiyoni Brown, Happy D, Tika, Liam, P. Bo, and Tre, are racially diverse and portray Latin, black and white people. They have a street sensibility and are dressed in urban fashions. Their accessories include ghetto blasters, cell phones, "bling-bling" jewellery and stick-on tattoos. The packaging, which doubles as a doll stand, is designed as a wall painted with graffiti. Instructions on the box say: "Pull my street stand from the box, so I have a spot to hang out." Newsweek described them as "edgy" and "ghetto-fabulous". Marketed with a focus on self-expression and individuality, the Flavas dolls have more points of articulation than traditional fashion dolls, allowing for a wider range of posing and, according to Mattel, the expression of more "attitude". Each doll has a unique face sculpt and a different height, ranging from 10–11.5 inches (250–290 mm). They were each released in two different styles and each style was packaged with two different outfits. The complex jointing and individual molds made the Flavas dolls more difficult to manufacture than most other fashion dolls.

== Background and launch ==
By the late 1990s, Mattel had dominated the fashion doll market since the 1959 release of their Barbie doll. At the 1997 peak they held more than 90% of the market. MGA Entertainment released Bratz in 2001. With big heads and pouty lips they appealed to the 8- to 12-year-old tween market group. Bratz achieved great success and gradually took over some of the more wholesome Barbie doll's market share. Meanwhile, the market for Barbie grew younger. By 2003, the main market was 3 to 6-year-olds and Barbie's share of the fashion doll market had dropped to about 70%. In Fall 2002, Mattel released My Scene, a line of redesigned Barbie dolls, in a bid to appeal to tweens and compete with Bratz; however, they failed to reverse the company's faltering sales. Less than a year after the My Scene release, Flavas were launched in Summer 2003 in a second attempt to appeal to the tween market and offer competition to Bratz. Production began only three months after Flavas were designed, and The New York Times described their launch as being rushed. The New York Times said that Flavas "appeared to be heavily inspired" by Bratz while Newsweek described Bratz as the "anti-Barbie" and Flavas as Mattel's "anti-Barbie of its own." Wall Street Journal commented that the Bratz success pushed Mattel to release Flavas in direct competition with its own Barbie dolls.

Flavas, which per Mattel should be pronounced FLAY-vuhz, were marketed with the slogan "What's Your Flava?" Mattel described them as "the first reality-based fashion doll brand" with "authentic style, attitude and values." Jerry Bossick, a Mattel senior vice president said: "Older girls want a doll that represents realistic aspirations." Mattel representative Julia Jensen said: "Our research told us that a lot of young girls are now aspiring to the world of rap and hip-hop music." The song "What's Your Flava?" from British R&B artist Craig David was used in Flavas television commercials, which aired during teen-targeted programming. Jensen said that "by aligning with a real song by an incredible artist like Craig David" they strengthened their position of "authenticity and reality." Coinciding with the US release, the Flavas brand sponsored Christina Aguilera's 2003 summer tour. In the United Kingdom, Flavas were launched by the British hip hop group Mis-Teeq.

== Criticism and discontinuation ==
Kyra Kyles from the Chicago Tribune described the Flavas dolls as out of touch and questionable role models for children, calling them "unimaginative stereotypes" and saying that one of the dolls looks like a "drug-dealing pimp." Toy industry analyst Sean McGowan said that they look like "hip-hop as designed by committee." Raquel Wilson, editor in chief of hip-hop e-zine Verbalisms said: "They completely misrepresent the culture." Dr John Richer, a clinical child psychologist in Oxford, England said: "This has the same sort of flavour as beauty contests in America where little kids get dolled up as teenagers." Miriam Arond, the editor in chief of Child described the dolls' multiculturalism as positive: "a very nice way of helping children all over the country realize that people look many different ways." Several British toy industry analysts expected the Flavas dolls to sell well, one of them saying that "the risqué nature of these dolls would guarantee their success."

However, the dolls sold poorly—The Wall Street Journal described their results as "disastrous". According to the Associated Press, some analysts believed Flavas were just "too edgy." Businessweek said that the "clunky jewelry and graffiti on the packaging [...] scared away mothers and left kids cold." The dolls ended up being taken off the market after less than a year. Several Mattel executives were let go following the discontinuation. Moe Tkacik of Slate described Flavas as "ridiculous, but in a cute way" and questioned if their hasty withdrawal had been premature, suggesting they could have found a niche market.
