= Spanish (song) =

2003 single by Craig David

Single by Craig David

from the album Slicker Than Your Average
- Released: 28 July 2003
- Length: 5:03 (album version); 3:38 (radio edit)
- Label: Wildstar; Atlantic
- Songwriters: Craig David; Trevor Henry; Anthony Marshall
- Producer: Anthony Marshall

Craig David singles chronology
"Rise & Fall" (2003)	"Spanish" (2003)	"World Filled with Love" (2003)

Music video
- "Spanish" on YouTube

"Spanish" is a song by British singer Craig David. It was written by David, Trevor Henry, and Anthony Marshall for his second album, Slicker Than Your Average (2002), with production helmed by the latter. The song was released as the album's fourth single and became a tenth top ten hit on the UK Singles Chart, peaking at number 8 and spending six weeks inside the top 75. "Spanish" saw David incorporate Spanish elements into his music for the first time, including a feature by Spanish rapper Duke One. In Australia, "Spanish" was skipped and "World Filled with Love" was released there as the fourth single instead.

== Music video ==
A video for "Spanish" was directed by directing team Calabazitaz.

== Track listing ==
UK CD1
No.	Title	Writer(s)	Producer(s)	Length
1.	"Spanish" (Radio Edit)	Craig David; Trevor Henry; Anthony Marshall	Marshall	4:44
2.	"What's Your Flava?" (Live from Down Under)	David; Henry; Marshall		4:35
3.	"Candle in the Wind" (Live from The Old Vic, London)	Elton John; Bernie Taupin		3:31

UK CD2
No.	Title	Writer(s)	Producer(s)	Length
1.	"Spanish" (Radio Edit)	David; Henry; Marshall	Marshall	3:38
2.	"Spanish" (Blacksmith R&B Rerub)	David; Henry; Marshall	David; Henry; Marshall; Blacksmith^{[a]}	4:35
3.	"Spanish" (Rishi Rich Desi Kulcha Remix featuring Juggy D)	David; Henry; Marshall	David; Henry; Marshall; Rishi Rich^{[a]}	4:46
4.	"Spanish" (Jon Riley Club Mix)	David; Henry; Marshall	David; Henry; Marshall; Danny D^{[a]}; Jon Riley^{[a]}	5:36

Notes

- ^{^[a]} signifies an additional producer

== Charts ==
Chart performance for "Spanish"
Chart (2003–2004)	Peak position
Australia (ARIA)	60
Belgium (Ultratip Bubbling Under Flanders)	4
Belgium (Ultratip Bubbling Under Wallonia)	3
Hungary (Editors' Choice Top 40)	26
Ireland (IRMA)	31
Netherlands (Dutch Top 40 Tipparade)	11
Netherlands (Single Top 100)	83
Switzerland (Schweizer Hitparade)	39
Scotland Singles (OCC)	23
UK Singles (OCC)	8
UK Hip Hop/R&B (OCC)	3

== Release history ==
Release history and formats for "Spanish"
Region	Date	Format(s)	Label	Ref.
United Kingdom	28 July 2003	Digital download	Wildstar; Atlantic	
