= Where's Your Love =

Single by Craig David featuring Tinchy Stryder

from the album Greatest Hits
- Released: 10 November 2008
- Length: 4:34
- Label: Warner Bros.; Sire
- Songwriters: David; Fraser T Smith; June Hamm; Stephen Emmanuel; Kwasi Danquah III
- Producer: Fraser T Smith

Craig David singles chronology
"Officially Yours" (2008)	"Where's Your Love" (2008)	"Insomnia" (2008)

Tinchy Stryder singles chronology
"Stryderman" (2008)	"Where's Your Love" (2008)	"Take Me Back" (2009)

Rita Ora singles chronology
"Where's Your Love" (2008)	"Hot Right Now" (2012)

Music video
- "Where's Your Love" on YouTube

"Where's Your Love" is a song by British singer Craig David from his album Greatest Hits. It features vocals from British-Ghanaian rapper Tinchy Stryder and British singer Rita Ora (although her vocals are not officially credited). It was made available for digital download only, on 10 November 2008 in both Ireland and the United Kingdom. The song samples the intro from "Hold On (SE22 mix)" by Colours (Stephen Emmanuel), with Ora singing the vocals of the chorus. The song reached number 58 on the UK Singles Chart.

== Music video ==
A music video for "Where's Your Love" was directed by Steve Kemsley. It features David singing with Tinchy Stryder rapping and vocals from Rita Ora, with lyrics bouncing around a white background, with the occasional corridor with only David singing. The video was uploaded and released to the streaming media website YouTube on 17 October 2008.

== Track listings ==
Digital download

1. "Where's Your Love" (featuring Tinchy Stryder and Rita Ora) – 4:34
2. "Where's Your Love" (featuring Tinchy Stryder) – 3:35

== Charts ==
Chart performance for "Where's Your Love"
Chart (2008)	Peak position
UK Singles (Official Charts)	58
