= World Filled with Love =

2003 single by Craig David

Single by Craig David

from the album Slicker Than Your Average
- Released: 1 September 2003
- Genre: R&B
- Length: 3:44
- Label: Wildstar
- Songwriters: Craig David; Fraser T. Smith
- Producers: Craig David; Fraser T. Smith

Craig David singles chronology
"Spanish" (2003)	"World Filled with Love" (2003)	"You Don't Miss Your Water ('Til the Well Runs Dry)" (2003)

Music video
- "World Filled with Love" on YouTube

"World Filled with Love" is a song by British singer Craig David. It was written by David and Fraser T. Smith for his second studio album, Slicker Than Your Average (2002). The song served as the album's fifth UK and the fourth worldwide single. It became David's first single to miss the UK top 10, breaking his run of 10 consecutive top-10 hits (counting his two Artful Dodger collaborations), peaking at number 15 on the UK Singles Chart. In Australia, it became his second-lowest charting single, whereas in France, it is his lowest-charting. "World Filled with Love" was the final single taken from the album in France. One further single was released in both the United Kingdom and Australia.

== Music video ==
A music video for "World Filled with Love" was directed by directing team Calabazitaz.

== Track listing ==
UK CD1
No.	Title	Writer(s)	Producer(s)	Length
1.	"World Filled with Love" (Radio Edit)	Craig David; Fraser T. Smith	Smith	3:43
2.	"World Filled with Love" (Miss Cherokee Remix featuring J. Gunn)	David; Smith	David; Smith; Miss Cherokee^{[a]}	4:35
3.	"World Filled with Love" (Mentor Remix)	David; Smith	David; Smith; Mentor^{[a]}	3:23

UK CD2
No.	Title	Writer(s)	Producer(s)	Length
1.	"World Filled with Love" (Radio Edit)	David; Smith	Smith	3:42
2.	"Candle in the Wind" (Live From The Old Vic, London)	Elton John; Bernie Taupin		3:33
3.	"What's Your Flava?" (Live From Down Under)	David; Trevor Henry; Anthony Marshall		4:32

Notes

- ^{^[a]} signifies an additional producer

== Charts ==
Weekly chart performance for "World Filled with Love"
Chart (2003–2004)	Peak position
Australia (ARIA)	32
Australian Urban (ARIA)	14
France (SNEP)	83
Germany (GfK)	94
Switzerland (Schweizer Hitparade)	40
Scotland Singles (Official Charts)	19
UK Singles (Official Charts)	15
UK Hip Hop/R&B (Official Charts)	7

== Release history ==
Release history and formats for "World Filled with Love"
Region	Date	Format(s)	Label(s)	Ref.
Australia	1 September 2003	CD	Wildstar; Atlantic	
United Kingdom	13 October 2003	CD	Wildstar; Atlantic	
