= Hidden Agenda (Craig David song) =

2003 single by Craig David

- UK CD1 single

Single by Craig David

from the album Slicker Than Your Average
- Released: 6 January 2003
- Genre: R&B
- Length: 3:34 (album version); 4:12 (single version)
- Label: Wildstar
- Songwriters: Craig David; Mark Hill
- Producer: Mark Hill

Craig David singles chronology
"What's Your Flava?" (2002)	"Hidden Agenda" (2003)	"Rise & Fall" (2003)

Music video
- "Hidden Agenda" on YouTube

"Hidden Agenda" is a song by English singer Craig David. It was written by David and producer Mark Hill for his second studio album, Slicker Than Your Average (2002). The song was released on 6 January 2003 as the album's second single and became his eighth top-10 hit in the United Kingdom (including his Artful Dodger collaborations), peaking at number 10 and spending six weeks inside the UK top 75. After the change in sound between his debut album, Born to Do It, and "What's Your Flava?", the lead single from Slicker Than Your Average, "Hidden Agenda" returned David to the sound for which he was known for in his worldwide hits such as "7 Days" and "Walking Away" and re-united him with Artful Dodger record producer Mark Hill.

== Music video ==
The music video for "Hidden Agenda" features Puerto Rican model Roselyn Sánchez and was directed by directing team Calabazitaz. The video was filmed in Tlacotalpan, Mexico.

== Track listings ==
UK CD1
No.	Title	Writer(s)	Producer(s)	Length
1.	"Hidden Agenda" (Radio Edit)	Craig David; Mark Hill	Hill	3:36
2.	"Come Together" (Live From Radio City Music Hall, New York)	Lennon–McCartney	Fraser T. Smith	4:06
3.	"Hidden Agenda" (Instrumental)	David; Hill	Hill	4:15
4.	"Hidden Agenda" (Video)			3:40

UK CD2
No.	Title	Writer(s)	Producer(s)	Length
1.	"Hidden Agenda" (Radio Edit)	Craig David; Mark Hill	Hill	3:34
2.	"Hidden Agenda" (Blacksmith Rerub featuring Know ?uestion)	David; Hill	Hill; Blacksmith^{[a]}	4:54
3.	"Hidden Agenda" (Soulshock & Karlin Remix)	David; Hill	Hill; Soulshock & Karlin^{[a]}	3:50
4.	"Hidden Agenda" (Plasma Remix featuring Messiah Bolical)	David; Hill	Hill; Plasma^{[a]}	4:50

Notes

- ^{^[a]} signifies an additional producer

== Charts ==
=== Weekly charts ===
Weekly chart performance for "Hidden Agenda"
Chart (2003)	Peak position
Australia (ARIA)	24
Australian Urban (ARIA)	9
Belgium (Ultratop 50 Flanders)	39
Belgium (Ultratop 50 Wallonia)	39
Czech Republic (IFPI)	38
Europe (Eurochart Hot 100)	31
France (SNEP)	70
Germany (GfK)	65
Hungary (Editors' Choice Top 40)	19
Ireland (IRMA)	32
Italy (FIMI)	20
Netherlands (Dutch Top 40)	28
Netherlands (Single Top 100)	43
New Zealand (Recorded Music NZ)	13
Poland Airplay (Music & Media)	8
Poland (Polish Airplay Chart)	13
Romania (Romanian Top 100)	23
Scottish Singles Sales (Official Charts)	17
Sweden (Sverigetopplistan)	49
Switzerland (Schweizer Hitparade)	50
UK Singles (Official Charts)	10
UK Hip Hop/R&B (Official Charts)	4
US Bubbling Under Hot 100 (Billboard)	19
US Pop Airplay (Billboard)	31

=== Year-end charts ===
Year-end chart performance for "Hidden Agenda"
Chart (2003)	Position
UK Singles (OCC)	197

== Release history ==
Release history and formats for "Hidden Agenda"
Region	Date	Format(s)	Label(s)	Ref.
United States	6 January 2003	Rhythmic contemporary; urban radio	Atlantic	
United Kingdom	20 January 2003	CD; cassette	Wildstar	
United States	3 February 2003	Adult contemporary radio	Atlantic	
Australia	17 February 2003	CD	Warner Music Australia	
Japan	21 February 2003	CD	Telstar	
