= Commitment (Craig David album) =

Studio album by Craig David
- Released: 8 August 2025
- Length: 41:49
- Labels: Craig David; Believe UK
- Producers: Mike Brainchild; Tre Jean-Marie; Toddla T; H Money

Craig David chronology
22 (2022)	Commitment (2025)

Singles from Commitment
- 1. "In Your Hands" Released: 27 September 2024; 2. "SOS" Released: 17 January 2025; 3. "Commitment" Released: 26 February 2025; 4. "Wake Up" Released: 16 April 2025; 5. "In It with You" Released: 11 July 2025; 6. "Rain" Released: 4 August 2025

Professional ratings
Review scores
Source	Rating
MusicOMH	2.5/5 stars
The Music Upcoming	3/5 stars

Commitment is the ninth studio album by English singer and songwriter Craig David, released on 8 August 2025, independently released by David, under licence to Believe Music UK. It is David's first studio album since 2022's 22. It was preceded by six singles: "In Your Hands", "SOS", "Commitment" (in collaboration with Nigerian singer Tiwa Savage), "Wake Up", "In It with You" (in collaboration with American singer JoJo), and "Rain".

== Background and release ==
David announced the album's forthcoming release date, cover art, and tracklisting, on 16 April 2025.

== Promotion ==
=== Singles ===
Commitment was preceded by six singles:

- On 27 September 2024, David released "In Your Hands" as the album's first single; the chorus interpolates the African-American spiritual "He's Got the Whole World in His Hands". The single garnered generally positive reviews, with Vibe writer Mya Abraham calling it a "deeply emotional record". A music video, directed by Lx, premiered on the same day.
- "SOS" was released as the second official single on 17 January 2025. The music video, directed by MFB, was released on the same day. "SOS" peaked at number 88 on the UK Singles Downloads Chart and at number 91 on the UK Singles Sales Chart.
- David followed these releases with the single "Commitment", featuring Nigerian singer Tiwa Savage on 26 February 2025. An official music video, directed by MFB, was released on 19 March 2025. It peaked at number 51 on the UK Singles Downloads Chart and at number 53 on the UK Singles Sales Chart.
- On 16 April 2025, David released "Wake Up" as the album's fourth single. An official visualiser, created by Josue Samuel, was released on YouTube on the same day.
- On 11 July 2025, Craig David released his collaboration with JoJo, "In It with You", as the album's fifth single.
- On 4 August 2025, Craig released "Rain" as the album's sixth single, alongside an official video; the song was the first track recorded for the album.

=== Live performances and interviews ===
In January 2025, it was announced that David would perform as part of Kew the Music 2025 at Kew Gardens on 8 July 2025. A month later, in February 2025, it was announced David would perform in concert at Kent Castle on 6 July 2025. In February 2025, David embarked on a tour across the United Kingdom; on the tour he performed singles "In Your Hands", "SOS" and a solo version of "Commitment", alongside previous hits.

David appeared on the 16 April 2025 episode of This Morning to discuss his visit to his childhood home, and spoke about his career. In June 2025, David headlined the Southampton Summer Sessions, alongside TS5. The next month, he appeared in an interview with GRM Daily, speaking about his career, legacy, and new music.

== Commercial performance ==
On 11 August 2025, the Official Charts Company (OCC) ranked Commitment seventh on its UK Midweek Albums Chart. At the end of the week, it debuted at number ten on the UK Albums Chart, becoming David's seventh top ten entry. The album also was David's second chart topper on the UK Album Downloads Chart and reached two on the UK Independent Singles Chart, number three on the UK Physical Albums Chart, number 14 on the UK Vinyl Albums Chart. In Scotland, Commitment opened at number 72 on the Scottish Albums Chart, making it his lowest-charting album yet.

== Track listing ==
Commitment track listing
No.	Title	Writer(s)	Producer(s)	Length
1.	"Wake Up"	Craig David; Mike Brainchild; Lemar Mahone; Craig Simpkins; Keith Mayberry	Mike Brainchild	2:53
2.	"In It with You" (featuring JoJo)	David; Brainchild; Negin Djafari	Brainchild	3:12
3.	"Commitment" (featuring Tiwa Savage)	David; Brainchild; Sean Wander; Tiwatope Omolara Savage; Donel Donald Mangena	Brainchild	3:11
4.	"Leave the Light On" (featuring Louisa Johnson)	David; Brainchild; Djafari; Rebecca Claire Hill; Thomas McKenzie Bell	Toddla T	3:18
5.	"Mr Right"	David; Harmony Samuels; Carmen Reece	H Money; Reece^{[a]}	3:47
6.	"SOS"	David; Tre Jean-Marie	Jean-Marie	3:30
7.	"Dominoes"	David; Brainchild; Theo Hutchcraft; David Sneddon	Brainchild	3:04
8.	"Your Way"	DavidBrainchild; Kwame Yeboah	Brainchild	2:58
9.	"In Your Hands"	David; Michael Engmann	Brainchild	3:17
10.	"Last Chance with You"	David; Uzoechi Emenike; Brainchild	Brainchild	3:02
11.	"Rain"	David; Jean-Marie; Talay Riley	Jean-Marie	3:34
12.	"Perfect Love"	David; Jermaine Scott; Brainchild	Brainchild	3:27
13.	"So Special"	David; Scott; Nick Gale; Brainchild	Brainchild	2:36
Total length:				41:49

Extended Vibes Edition
No.	Title	Length
14.	"Commitment" (remix; with Tiwa Savage featuring Kranium)	3:57
15.	"Commitment" (remix; with Tiwa Savage featuring Mary Ann Alexander)	3:57
16.	"Commitment" (garage remix; with Tiwa Savage featuring Zed Bias and Patrick Nazemi)	4:08
17.	"Commitment" (reggae remix; with Tiwa Savage featuring Kranium)	3:48
18.	"Rain" (tropical house remix)	3:08
19.	"Rain" (radio edit)	3:25
20.	"Rain" (sped up)	3:00
Total length:		67:12

=== Notes ===
- ^a signifies a vocal producer
- "Wake Up" contains elements of "R U Sleeping" (Bump & Flex Vocal) by Indo.

== Charts ==
Chart performance for Commitment
Chart (2025)	Peak position
Scottish Albums (Official Charts)	71
UK Albums (Official Charts)	10
UK Independent Albums (Official Charts)	2

== Release history ==
Release history for Commitment
Version	Region	Date	Format(s)	Label	Ref.
Standard	Various	8 August 2025	CD; digital download; streaming; vinyl	Craig David, Believe UK	
Extended Vibes	Various	11 August 2025	Digital download, streaming	Craig David, Believe UK	
