= When You Know What Love Is =

Single by Craig David
- Released: 31 May 2019
- Length: 3:25
- Label: Insanity; Sony
- Songwriter(s): Craig David; Gary Barlow; Fraser T. Smith; Janee Bennett
- Producer(s): Fraser T. Smith

Craig David singles chronology
"Magic" (2018)	"When You Know What Love Is" (2019)	"Do You Miss Me Much" (2019)

Music video
- "When You Know What Love Is" on YouTube

"When You Know What Love Is" is a song by British singer Craig David. It was written by David, Gary Barlow, Fraser T. Smith, and Janee Bennett for his eighth studio album, 22 (2022), while production was helmed by Smith. The song was released as a digital download on 31 May 2019. Initially announced to serve as the album's lead single, it was later omitted from the final track listing. "When You Know What Love Is" peaked at number 52 on the UK Singles Chart.

== Background ==
In a press release, David said that the track was "about the initial undeniable spark you get when something feels right - wanting to hold on to that feeling and seeing how it can develop."

== Music video ==
A music video to accompany the release of "When You Know What Love Is" was first released onto YouTube on 1 July 2019 at a total length of three minutes and twenty-five seconds. Directed by Charlie Sarsfield, it was filmed in Ibiza.

== Track listing ==
All tracks written by Craig David, Gary Barlow, Fraser T. Smith, and Janee Bennett.

Digital download
No.	Title	Producer(s)	Length
1.	"When You Know What Love Is"	Fraser T. Smith	3:25

Digital download (Remixes)
No.	Title	Producer(s)	Length
1.	"When You Know What Love Is" (Majestic Remix)	Smith; Majestic^{[a]}	4:05
2.	"When You Know What Love Is" (Alex Adair Remix)	Smith; Alex Adair^{[a]}	3:30

Notes

- ^{^[a]} signifies an additional producer

== Credits and personnel ==
Credits adapted from the liner notes of "When You Know What Love Is."

- Janee Bennett – writer
- Gary Barlow – background vocalist, writer
- Paul Carr – assistant engineer
- Craig David – lead vocalist, writer
- Phoebe Edwards – background vocalist
- Manon Grandjean – mixing engineer
- Stuart Hawkes – mastering engineer
- Fraser T. Smith – producer, writer

== Charts ==
Chart performance for "When You Know What Love Is"
Chart (2019)	Peak position
Scotland (OCC)	12
UK Singles (OCC)	52

== Release history ==
Release dates and formats for "When You Know What Love Is"
Region	Date	Format(s)	Label(s)	Ref.
United Kingdom	31 May 2019	Digital download; streaming	Insanity; Speakerbox; Sony	
