= One More Lie (Standing in the Shadows) =

"One More Lie (Standing In The Shadows)"

Single by Craig David

from the album Signed Sealed Delivered
- Released: 22 March 2010
- Recorded: 2009
- Genre: Dance
- Length: 3:04
- Label: Universal Motown
- Songwriters: Craig David; Jerry Abbott; Grant Black; Shridhar Solanki; Brian Holland; Lamont Dozier; Eddie Holland
- Producers: Jerry Abbott; Grant Black

Craig David singles chronology
| "Insomnia" (2008) | "One More Lie (Standing In The Shadows)" (2010) | "All Alone Tonight (Stop, Look, Listen)" (2010) |

Music video
- "One More Lie (Standing In The Shadows)" on YouTube

"One More Lie (Standing in the Shadows)" is a song by British singer Craig David. It was written by David, Jerry Abbott, Grant Black, and Shridhar Solanki for his fifth studio album, Signed Sealed Delivered (2010), while production was helmed by Abbott and Black. The chorus samples from "Standing in the Shadows of Love" (1966) by American vocal quartet The Four Tops. Due to the inclusion of the sample, Brian Holland, Lamont Dozier, and Eddie Holland are also credited as songwriters. "One More Lie (Standing in the Shadows)" was released in the UK on 22 March 2010 as a digital download, serving as the album's lead single.

== Chart performance ==
"One More Lie (Standing in the Shadows)" debuted on the UK Singles Chart at number 76 in the week beginning 28 March 2010. It became David's lowest-charting single since "Officially Yours", which charted outside the top 100.

== Music video ==
A video for "One More Lie (Standing in the Shadows)" was directed by Dale Resteghini. It debuted on 21 January 2010 on YouTube and is mainly a club scene-based clip. It was also nominated for Best Video at the 2010 Urban Music Awards.

== Track listing ==
UK digital EP
| No. | Title | Producer(s) | Length |
|---|---|---|---|
| 1. | "One More Lie (Standing in the Shadows)" (Album Version) | Jerry Abbott; Grant Black | 3:04 |
| 2. | "One More Lie (Standing in the Shadows)" (Haji & Emmanuel Mix) | Abbott; Black; Haji & Emmanuel Mix^{[a]} | 3:00 |
| 3. | "One More Lie (Standing in the Shadows)" (Donae'o Mix) | Abbott; Black; Donae'o^{[a]} | 4:31 |

UK iTunes digital track
| No. | Title | Producer(s) | Length |
|---|---|---|---|
| 1. | "One More Lie (Standing in the Shadows)" (Groove Odyssey Mix) | Abbott; Black; Groove Odyssey^{[a]} | 3:35 |

UK iTunes digital track
| No. | Title | Producer(s) | Length |
|---|---|---|---|
| 1. | "One More Lie (Standing in the Shadows)" (RedTop Mix) | Abbott; Black; RedTop ^{[a]} | 3:18 |

== Charts ==
Chart performance for "One More Lie"
| Chart (2010) | Peak position |
|---|---|
| South Korea International (Gaon) | 193 |
| UK Singles (OCC) | 76 |
| UK Hip Hop/R&B (OCC) | 24 |
