= Rendezvous (Craig David song) =

2001 single by Craig David

- UK CD1 single

Single by Craig David

from the album Born to Do It
- Released: 19 March 2001
- Genre: R&B
- Length: 4:37 (album version); 3:46 (radio edit)
- Label: Wildstar; Atlantic
- Songwriters: Craig David; Mark Hill
- Producer: Mark Hill

Craig David singles chronology
"Walking Away" (2000)	"Rendezvous" (2001)	"What's Your Flava?" (2002)

Music video
- "Rendezvous" on YouTube

"Rendezvous" is a song by British singer Craig David. It was released on 19 March 2001 as the fourth and final single from his debut studio album, Born to Do It, and became his fifth top ten hit from the album, following "Rewind", "Fill Me In", "7 Days" and "Walking Away".

== Chart performance ==
The single reached number eight on the UK Singles Chart, spending 10 weeks inside the top 75.

== Music video ==
The music video was directed by Max & Dania.

There are two Craig Davids in this video. The first one shown is the slick, ladies man. The other one is humble, trustworthy, and spends time with his parents and only admires one girl. They both go to a club, where the first Craig is hitting on all the girls, while the other Craig is with his one and only girl. Towards the end, the first Craig tries to hit on the other Craig's girlfriend, but the other Craig brushes him off and wins back his girlfriend.

== Track listings ==
CD 1

1. "Rendezvous" (Radio Edit)
2. "Walking Away" (Live in Amsterdam)
3. "No More" (featuring Guru)

CD 2

1. "Rendezvous" (Radio Edit)
2. "Rendezvous" (Blacksmith R&B Rerub) (featuring Know ?uestion)
3. "Rendezvous" (Sunship vs. Chunky Remix Edit)
4. "Rendezvous" (Treats Remix)

== Charts ==
=== Weekly charts ===
Chart (2001)	Peak position
Australia (ARIA)	28
Australian Urban (ARIA)	9
Belgium (Ultratip Bubbling Under Flanders)	3
Belgium (Ultratip Bubbling Under Wallonia)	4
Croatia (HRT)	2
Europe (Eurochart Hot 100)	33
France (SNEP)	61
Germany (GfK)	86
Ireland (IRMA)	29
Italy (FIMI)	49
Netherlands (Dutch Top 40 Tipparade)	2
Netherlands (Single Top 100)	56
New Zealand (Recorded Music NZ)	31
Poland Airplay (Music & Media)	5
Scottish Singles Sales (Official Charts)	18
Switzerland (Schweizer Hitparade)	74
UK Singles (Official Charts)	8
UK Hip Hop/R&B (Official Charts)	2

=== Year-end charts ===
Chart (2001)	Rank
UK Singles (OCC)	125

== Certifications ==
Region	Certification	Certified units/sales
United Kingdom (BPI)	Silver	200,000^{‡}
^{‡} Sales+streaming figures based on certification alone.
