= Insomnia (Craig David song) =

Single by Craig David

from the album Greatest Hits
- Released: 17 November 2008
- Genre: R&B; Dance
- Length: 3:25
- Label: Warner Bros.; Sire
- Songwriters: Craig David; Jim Beanz
- Producer: Jim Beanz

Craig David singles chronology
"Where's Your Love" (2008)	"Insomnia" (2008)	"One More Lie (Standing in the Shadows)" (2010)

Music video
- "Insomnia" on YouTube

"Insomnia" is a song by British singer Craig David. It was written by David and Jim Beanz and recorded for the former's compilation album, Greatest Hits (2008). Released as the album's lead single, it became a top ten hit in Belgium and Bulgaria.

== Composition ==
The song is performed in the key of D♯ minor with a tempo of 125 beats per minute.

== Music video ==
A music video for "Insomnia" was directed by Sarah Chatfield.

== Cover versions ==
In October 2008, Craig David asked South Korean singer Wheesung to sing a Korean version of his song "Insomnia". Wheesung's version was released in February 2009.

== Track listing ==
Digital single
No.	Title	Producer(s)	Length
1.	"Insomnia" (Album Version)	Craig David; Jim Beanz	3:25
2.	"Insomnia" (Donae'o Remix)	David; Beanz; Donae'o^{[a]}	5:48
3.	"Insomnia" (Haji and Emmanuel Remix)	David; Beanz; Haji and Emmanuel^{[a]}	6:40
4.	"Insomnia" (Donaeo Vocal Dub)	David; Beanz; Donae'o^{[a]}	5:47
5.	"Insomnia" (Haji and Emmanuel Remix Dub)	David; Beanz; Haji and Emmanuel^{[a]}	6:13

Notes

- ^{^[a]} signifies an additional producer

== Charts ==
=== Weekly charts ===
Weekly chart performance for "Insomnia"
Chart (2008–09)	Peak position
Australia (ARIA)	89
Belgium (Ultratop 50 Flanders)	4
Belgium (Ultratop 50 Wallonia)	4
Bulgaria (BAMP)	8
CIS Airplay (TopHit)	5
Denmark (Tracklisten)	21
Hungary (Rádiós Top 40)	18
Japan (Japan Hot 100)	11
Netherlands (Single Top 100)	81
Russia Airplay (TopHit)	7
Switzerland (Schweizer Hitparade)	84
UK Singles (OCC)	43

=== Year-end charts ===
Year-end chart performance for "Insomnia"
Chart (2008)	Position
CIS (Tophit)	153
Russia Airplay (TopHit)	143
Chart (2009)	Position
Belgium (Ultratop Flanders)	50
Belgium (Ultratop Wallonia)	32
Hungary (Rádiós Top 40)	68
Russia Airplay (TopHit)	100
