= Don't Love You No More (I'm Sorry) =

Single by Craig David

from the album The Story Goes...
- Released: 31 October 2005
- Length: 4:04
- Label: Warner Bros.
- Songwriters: Craig David; Mark Hill
- Producer: Mark Hill

Craig David singles chronology
"All the Way" (2005)	"Don't Love You No More (I'm Sorry)" (2005)	"Unbelievable" (2006)

Music video
- "Don't Love You No More (I'm Sorry)" on YouTube

"Don't Love You No More (I'm Sorry)" is a song by British singer Craig David. It was written by David and Mark Hill for his third studio album, The Story Goes... (2005). "Don't Love You No More (I'm Sorry)" gave David his second top ten hit from The Story Goes... and one of his biggest hits to date, tying with number-one single "7 Days" for longest-running single in the UK top 75, spending fifteen weeks on the chart. However, "Don't Love You No More (I'm Sorry)" is his biggest for most consecutive weeks inside the top 75 as "7 Days" had fourteen, before it re-entered for a week. The song was his biggest hit from The Story Goes, peaking at number 4, one place lower than "All the Way", which only spent six weeks inside the top 75.

== Chart performance ==
"Don't Love You No More (I'm Sorry)" charted at number four on the UK Singles Chart, supplying him with his longest-running single since "7 Days", spending almost four months inside the UK top 75. In France, "Don't Love You No More (I'm Sorry)" missed the top 40.

== Music video ==
There are two versions of the "Don't Love You No More (I'm Sorry)" video, a black-and-white version, which was first serviced to TV channels and a colour version, which was released later. The video was directed by Robert Hales.

== Track listing ==
All tracks written by Craig David and Mark Hill.

UK CD1
No.	Title	Producer(s)	Length
1.	"Don't Love You No More (I'm Sorry)" (Radio Edit)	Hill	4:04
2.	"Walking Away" (Live from Tokyo, September 2005)	Hill	3:28

UK CD2
No.	Title	Producer(s)	Length
1.	"Don't Love You No More (I'm Sorry)" (Radio Edit)	Hill	4:04
2.	"Exception to the Rule"	Hill	4:19
3.	"Don't Love You No More (I'm Sorry)" (Redstar Vocal Mix)	Hill; RedStar^{[a]}	6:57
4.	"Don't Love You No More (I'm Sorry)" (Cool Kidd's Solid Air Remix)	Hill; Cool Kidd^{[a]}	3:42

Notes

- ^{^[a]} signifies an additional producer

== Charts ==
Weekly chart performance for "Don't Love You No More (I'm Sorry)"
Chart (2005–06)	Peak position
Australia (ARIA)	72
Belgium (Ultratip Bubbling Under Flanders)	2
Belgium (Ultratip Bubbling Under Wallonia)	3
Europe (Eurochart Hot 100)	15
France (SNEP)	45
Germany (GfK)	65
Hungary (Rádiós Top 40)	30
Ireland (IRMA)	30
Netherlands (Dutch Top 40 Tipparade)	17
Scotland Singles (OCC)	5
Switzerland (Schweizer Hitparade)	35
UK Singles (OCC)	4
UK Hip Hop/R&B (OCC)	1

=== Year-end charts ===
Year-end chart performance for "Don't Love You No More (I'm Sorry)"
Chart (2005)	Position
UK Singles (OCC)	58

== Certifications ==
Certifications for "Don't Love You No More (I'm Sorry)"
Region	Certification	Certified units/sales
United Kingdom (BPI)	Silver	200,000^{‡}
^{‡} Sales+streaming figures based on certification alone.

== Release history ==
Release history and formats for "Don't Love You No More (I'm Sorry)"
Region	Date	Format(s)	Label	Ref.
United Kingdom	31 October 2005	CD single; digital download	Warner Bros. Records	
