= The Story Goes... =

Studio album by Craig David
- Released: 6 September 2005
- Genre: R&B
- Length: 56:31
- Label: Warner Bros.
- Producers: Craig David; Mark Hill; The Underdogs; Rick Nowels; Lee Groves; Soulshock and Karlin

Craig David chronology
Slicker Than Your Average (2002)	The Story Goes... (2005)	Trust Me (2007)

Singles from The Story Goes...
- 1. "All the Way" Released: 8 August 2005; 2. "Don't Love You No More (I'm Sorry)" Released: 31 October 2005; 3. "Unbelievable" Released: 6 March 2006

The Story Goes... is the third studio album by English singer Craig David, released on 6 September 2005 by Warner Bros. Records in the UK. The album entered the UK Albums Chart and peaked at number 5 in late 2005. The album peaked at number 9 on the Australian ARIA Albums Chart around the same time. It was not released in United States, partly due to Atlantic Records' uncertainty over whether the album was the right material for that market. Ultimately, in 2007, the album was released digitally and as an import in American record stores. The album sold over 500,000 copies worldwide.

== Critical reception ==
Professional ratings
Review scores
Source	Rating
AllMusic	3/5 stars
The Guardian	3/5 stars
MTV Asia	7/10
Now	3/5 Ns
Sputnikmusic	2/10

Sharon Mawer from AllMusic rated the album three out of five stars and wrote: "Produced by long-term David collaborator Mark Hill, The Story Goes... appears to fall between an urban R&B-flavored Usher-styled album and his earlier more hip-hop-influenced work with the Artful Dodger. It couldn't be both." Now critic Jason Richards found that the album was similar to the singer's last two – all of "which are softer than soap opera lighting. Yes, David has found a formula and stuck to it: catchy acoustic guitar-based jamz about relationship issues and, every so often, miscellaneous subjects like how unfair bullies are. The production is lukewarm and sanitized, and even at his most bad-boy he's still pretty tame. But you can't knock David's voice, which occasionally behaves like Marvin Gaye's and usually exudes a gentle warmth that makes you like him in spite of yourself."

Caroline Sullivan, writing for The Guardian, criticised the singer for abandoning the edgy UK garage style that made him famous. She felt that though his vocals remain strong on The Story Goes..., the music lacked grit and originality, with some tracks feeling derivative and overly polished. Kitty Empire from The Observer called the album "bland" and noted that even David's "upbeat R&B poses seem to have vanished in favour of pitter-pattering beats and wispy heartbreak." She concluded that The Story Goes... was "less a record than part of some kit that contains cheap chocolates and a box of tissues, available soon from Asda." musicOMH's Ben Hogwood felt that "too often though the album dabbles in schmaltz, and barely hits a danceable beat over the pulse rate to help David achieve anything like past glories." While he noted that the songs were still displaying David's "huge vocal talent," Hogwood felt that the "music needs more life, more passion and some proper beats once again."

== Track listing ==
The Story Goes... track listing
No.	Title	Writer(s)	Producer(s)	Length
1.	"All the Way"	Craig David; Mark Hill	Hill	3:56
2.	"Don't Love You No More (I'm Sorry)"	David; Hill	Hill	4:03
3.	"Hypnotic"	David; Rick Nowels	Nowels	4:19
4.	"Separate Ways"	David; Hill	Hill	4:01
5.	"Johnny"	David; Hill	Hill	4:20
6.	"Do You Believe in Love?"	David; Hill	Hill	3:46
7.	"One Last Dance"	David; Nowels	Nowels	3:47
8.	"Unbelievable"	David; Mark Taylor; Paul Barry	Taylor	3:22
9.	"Just Chillin'"	David; Nowels	Nowels	4:41
10.	"Thief in the Night"	David	Lee Groves	4:26
11.	"Take 'Em Off"	David; Antonio Dixon; Harvey Mason, Jr.; Eric Dawkins; Damon Thomas	The Underdogs	4:06
12.	"My Love Don't Stop"	David; Dixon; Mason, Jr.; Dawkins; Thomas	The Underdogs	4:12
13.	"Never Should Have Walked Away"	David; Hill	Hill	4:40
14.	"Let Her Go"	David; Hill	Hill	4:02
Total length:				56:31

Limited tour edition bonus disc
No.	Title	Writer(s)	Producer(s)	Length
1.	"Unbelievable" (Metro mix)	David; Taylor; Barry	Taylor
2.	"All the Way" (H-Money mix featuring Lyracis)	David; Hill	Hill
3.	"Don't Love You No More (I'm Sorry)" (Redstar remix)	David; Hill	Hill
4.	"All the Way" (live in Seoul, September 2005)	David; Hill	Hill
5.	"Don't Love You No More (I'm Sorry)" (live in Seoul, September 2005)	David; Hill	Hill
6.	"Rise & Fall" (live in Seoul, September 2005)	David; Gordon "Sting" Sumner; Dominic Miller	Soulshock and Karlin
7.	"Walking Away" (live in Seoul, September 2005)	David; Hill	Hill
8.	"Don't Love You No More (I'm Sorry)" (music video)
9.	"7 Days" (music video)

== Personnel ==
Credits adapted from album’s liner notes.

- Craig David – vocals (all tracks), producer (tracks 3, 7, 9, 10)
- Alex Dromgoole – mixing assistant (tracks 1–7, 9, 10, 13, 14)
- Lee Groves – producer (track 10), programming (tracks 1–7, 9, 10, 13, 14)
- Rob Haagart – mixing assistant (tracks 1–7, 9, 10, 13, 14)
- Mark Hill – producer (tracks 1, 2, 4–6, 13, 14)
- Harvey Mason Jr. – producer (tracks 11, 12)
- Rick Nowels – producer (tracks 3, 7, 9)
- Aaron Renner – assistant engineer (tracks 11, 12)
- Dave Russell – mixing (tracks 11, 12)
- Philip Sheppard – string arrangement (track 8)
- Alex Smith – assistant engineer (track 8)
- Mark "Spike" Stent – mixing (tracks 1–7, 9, 10, 13, 14)
- Ren Swan – mixing (track 8)
- Mark Taylor – producer, mixing, and string arrangements (track 8)
- Damon Thomas – producer (tracks 11, 12)
- David Treahearn – mixing assistant (tracks 1–7, 9, 10, 13, 14)
- Tim Young – mastering

== Charts ==
=== Weekly charts ===
Weekly chart performance for The Story Goes...
Chart (2005)	Peak position
Australian Albums (ARIA)	9
Austrian Albums (Ö3 Austria)	46
Belgian Albums (Ultratop Flanders)	5
Belgian Albums (Ultratop Wallonia)	7
Canadian Albums (Nielsen SoundScan)	27
Danish Albums (Hitlisten)	3
Dutch Albums (Album Top 100)	6
European Albums (Billboard)	4
Finnish Albums (Suomen virallinen lista)	36
French Albums (SNEP)	5
German Albums (Offizielle Top 100)	13
Hungarian Albums (MAHASZ)	25
Irish Albums (IRMA)	45
Italian Albums (FIMI)	5
Japanese Albums (Oricon)	6
New Zealand Albums (RMNZ)	34
Polish Albums (ZPAV)	12
Scottish Albums (Official Charts)	19
Spanish Albums (Promusicae)	2
Swedish Albums (Sverigetopplistan)	11
Swiss Albums (Schweizer Hitparade)	3
UK Albums (Official Charts)	5
UK R&B Albums (Official Charts)	1

=== Year-end charts ===
Year-end chart performance for The Story Goes...
Chart (2005)	Position
Belgian Albums (Ultratop Flanders)	93
Belgian Albums (Ultratop Wallonia)	98
French Albums (SNEP)	132
Japanese International Albums (Oricon)	30
Swiss Albums (Schweizer Hitparade)	84
UK Albums (OCC)	77

== Certifications ==
Certifications of The Story Goes..., with sales where available
Region	Certification	Certified units/sales
France (SNEP)	Gold	75,000^{*}
Japan (RIAJ)	Gold	100,000^{^}
Spain (Promusicae)	Gold	50,000^{^}
United Kingdom (BPI)	Platinum	300,000^{*}
^{*} Sales figures based on certification alone.^{^} Shipments figures based on certification alone.
