= You Don't Miss Your Water ('Til the Well Runs Dry) =

2003 single by Craig David

Single by Craig David

from the album Slicker Than Your Average
- Released: 29 December 2003
- Genre: R&B; Soul
- Length: 5:20 (album version); 4:12 (radio edit)
- Label: Wildstar
- Songwriters: Craig David; Mark Hill
- Producers: Mark Hill; Soulshock; Peter Biker

Craig David singles chronology
"World Filled with Love" (2003)	"You Don't Miss Your Water ('Til the Well Runs Dry)" (2003)	"All the Way" (2005)

Audio video
- "You Don't Miss Your Water ('Til the Well Runs Dry)" on YouTube

"You Don't Miss Your Water ('Til the Well Runs Dry)" is a song by British singer Craig David. It was written by David and Mark Hill for his second studio album, Slicker Than Your Average (2002), while production was helmed by Hill, with duo Soulshock and Peter Biker credited as additional producers. The song was released as the album's sixth and final single from and became one of David's lowest-charting singles to date, reaching number 43 on the UK Singles Chart.

== Music video ==
The video for "You Don't Miss Your Water ('Til the Well Runs Dry)" was a live performance video.

== Chart performance ==
"You Don't Miss Your Water ('Til the Well Runs Dry)" charted and peaked at forty-three on the UK Singles Chart, spending two weeks in the top 75.

== Covers ==
The song was covered by Rising Appalachia on their 2010 album, The Sails of Self.

== Track listing ==
UK CD
No.	Title	Writer(s)	Producer(s)	Length
1.	"You Don't Miss Your Water ('Til the Well Runs Dry)" (Radio Edit)	Craig David; Mark Hill	Hill; Soulshock^{[a]}; Peter Biker^{[a]}	4:13
2.	"Static"	David	Ignorants	4:11

Notes

- ^{^[a]} signifies an additional producer

== Charts ==
Chart performance for "You Don't Miss Your Water ('Til the Well Runs Dry)"
Chart (2004)	Peak position
Scotland Singles (OCC)	51
UK Singles (OCC)	43

== Release history ==
Release history and formats for "You Don't Miss Your Water ('Til the Well Runs Dry)"
Region	Date	Format(s)	Label	Ref.
United Kingdom	29 December 2003	CD single; digital download	Wildstar; Atlantic	
