= All the Way (Craig David song) =

2005 single by Craig David

Single by Craig David

from the album The Story Goes...
- Released: 8 August 2005
- Length: 3:55 (album version); 3:35 (radio edit)
- Label: Warner Bros.
- Songwriters: Craig David; Mark Hill
- Producer: Mark Hill

Craig David singles chronology
| "You Don't Miss Your Water ('Til the Well Runs Dry)" (2003) | "All the Way" (2005) | "Don't Love You No More (I'm Sorry)" (2005) |

Music video
- "All the Way" on YouTube

"All the Way" is a song recorded by the British singer Craig David. It was written by David and Mark Hill his third studio album, The Story Goes... (2005), while production was helmed by Hill. It was released on 8 August 2005 as the album's lead single, his first single he released with new label Warner Bros. Records after Wildstar Records went bankrupt. After missing the top ten with previous singles "World Filled with Love" and "You Don't Miss Your Water ('Til the Well Runs Dry)", "All the Way" returned David to the top three. It was the highest-charting single from The Story Goes... but not the biggest-selling as "Don't Love You No More (I'm Sorry)" spent over double the number of weeks inside the UK top 75.

== Chart performance ==
"All the Way" charted at number three on the UK Singles Chart, returning David to the top forty. "All the Way" spent six weeks inside the UK top 75.

== Music video ==
The music video became the sixth Craig David video directed by Max & Dania.

== Track listing ==
UK CD1
| No. | Title | Writer(s) | Producer(s) | Length |
|---|---|---|---|---|
| 1. | "All the Way" (Radio Edit) | Craig David; Mark Hill | Hill | 3:35 |
| 2. | "Take 'Em Off" | David; Antonio Dixon; Harvey Mason, Jr.; Eric Dawkins; Damon Thomas | The Underdogs | 4:06 |

UK CD2
| No. | Title | Writer(s) | Producer(s) | Length |
|---|---|---|---|---|
| 1. | "All the Way" (Radio Edit) | David; Hill | Hill | 3:35 |
| 2. | "Can You Feel Me" | David; Hill | Hill | 4:13 |
| 3. | "All the Way" (Kardinal Beats remix) | David; Hill | Hill; Kardinal Beats^{[a]} | 4:18 |
| 4. | "All the Way" (Sandy Rivera Blackwiz Mix) | David; Hill | Hill; Sandy Rivera^{[a]} | 7:17 |
| 5. | "All the Way" (Video) |

Notes

- ^{^[a]} signifies an additional producer

== Charts ==
=== Weekly charts ===
Weekly chart performance for "All the Way"
| Chart (2005) | Peak position |
|---|---|
| Australia (ARIA) | 31 |
| Australian Urban (ARIA) | 14 |
| Austria (Ö3 Austria Top 40) | 61 |
| Belgium (Ultratop 50 Flanders) | 28 |
| Belgium (Ultratop 50 Wallonia) | 28 |
| Denmark (Tracklisten) | 8 |
| Europe (Eurochart Hot 100) | 6 |
| France (SNEP) | 23 |
| Germany (GfK) | 38 |
| Hungary (Rádiós Top 40) | 13 |
| Hungary (Dance Top 40) | 19 |
| Hungary (Single Top 40) | 7 |
| Ireland (IRMA) | 27 |
| Italy (FIMI) | 12 |
| Netherlands (Dutch Top 40 Tipparade) | 2 |
| Netherlands (Single Top 100) | 47 |
| Poland (Polish Airplay Charts) | 1 |
| Russia Airplay (TopHit) | 34 |
| Scotland Singles (OCC) | 11 |
| Spain (PROMUSICAE) | 4 |
| Sweden (Sverigetopplistan) | 33 |
| Switzerland (Schweizer Hitparade) | 18 |
| UK Singles (OCC) | 3 |
| UK Hip Hop/R&B (OCC) | 1 |

=== Year-end charts ===
Year-end chart performance for "All the Way"
| Chart (2005) | Position |
|---|---|
| Hungary (Rádiós Top 40) | 57 |
| Russia Airplay (TopHit) | 125 |
| UK Singles (OCC) | 139 |

== Release history ==
Release history and formats for "All the Way"
| Region | Date | Format(s) | Label | Ref. |
|---|---|---|---|---|
| United Kingdom | 8 August 2005 | CD single; digital download | Warner Bros. Records | |
