= Slicker Than Your Average =

Studio album by Craig David
- Released: 19 November 2002
- Recorded: 2001–2002
- Genre: R&B
- Length: 60:05
- Labels: Atlantic; Wildstar
- Producer: Colin Lester

Craig David chronology
Born to Do It (2000)	Slicker Than Your Average (2002)	The Story Goes... (2005)

Singles from Slicker Than Your Average
- 1. "What's Your Flava?" Released: 28 October 2002; 2. "Hidden Agenda" Released: 20 January 2003; 3. "Rise & Fall" Released: 28 April 2003; 4. "Spanish" Released: 28 July 2003; 5. "World Filled with Love" Released: 13 October 2003; 6. "You Don't Miss Your Water ('Til the Well Runs Dry)" Released: 29 December 2003

Slicker Than Your Average is the second studio album by British singer Craig David, released on 19 November 2002 by Atlantic Records. It peaked at number 4 on the UK Albums Chart, number 5 on the Australian ARIA Albums Chart, and number 32 on the U.S. Billboard 200. It was certified Gold by RIAA in the U.S. and double Platinum by the British Phonographic Industry in the United Kingdom. On Slicker Than Your Average, Craig David shifts away from the UK garage-influenced sound of his debut album and adopts a style more closely aligned with U.S. R&B.

As of November 2013, the album has sold over 3.5 million copies worldwide. The album was released in a number of different versions. The original release contained 13 new tracks. A six-track bonus remix CD was released in Asia that featured remixes of the singles "Rise and Fall" and "Hidden Agenda", as well as versions of "Fill Me In" and the B-side "Four Times a Lady" from the single, "What's Your Flava?".

== Background and writing ==
After David managed to crack the American music industry with his hit debut studio album, Born to Do It, his musical style began to alter to appeal to the worldwide market on his second studio album. In an interview with ANDPOP's Adam Gonshor, David revealed the inspiration for some of the songs on the album. He was forced to stay in a hotel room for a week following the September 11 attacks in New York City in 2001, and it was this event that inspired him to write the song "World Filled with Love". In the interview, he said, "I was thinking, I'm actually in this world that's filled with madness, with this drama that's going on. Some of the things we were talking about in music, in the big picture, are so trivial...I thought music is a form of escapism, so I used it to write a song hopefully for positive means to say, we are in a world that's filled with love." David also commented that the album title could be looked at in two different ways: "On the one hand, it's coming across like I'm arrogant. On the other hand, it's saying I have a lot more composure on the album." The album was leaked onto the internet prior to its official release, but David was not too bothered as he felt that it "spreads the word".

In 2025, while browsing a record store, David described the album as "big" and said it changed his life as much as Born to Do It did.

== Critical reception ==
Professional ratings
Aggregate scores
Source	Rating
Metacritic	62/100
Review scores
Source	Rating
AllMusic	3/5 stars
BBC	(Mixed)
Blender	4/5 stars
Entertainment.ie	3/5 stars
Entertainment Weekly	B–
The Guardian	3/5 stars
NME	4/5 stars
Robert Christgau	(A−)
Rolling Stone	3/5 stars

Slicker Than Your Average received mixed to positive reviews from contemporary music critics. At Metacritic, which assigns a normalised rating out of 100 to reviews from mainstream critics, the album has an average score of 62 based on 14 reviews, indicating "generally favorable reviews". BBC Music's Keysha Davis wrote that "Slicker Than Your Average provides the listener with the opportunity to get into the mind of a truly gifted young star...there are enough club friendly tracks to ensure heavy rotation in the hottest nightspots". However, in reference to his success in the United States, she also pointed out "true fans may be a tad bit disappointed by the new super-slick musical direction". AllMusic's Christina Fuoco gave it a rating of three stars out of five and wrote "Slicker Than Your Average is stronger than the average sophomore effort...it proves that Craig David's abilities are innate". Pat Blashill, writing for Rolling Stone magazine, called it "one of the most subtle male R&B records in a good while" and gave it a 3/5 rating. Blender magazine's gave the album a rating of 4/5 and commented "David moves away from underground two-step...toward a modern, mainstream R&B record. Slicker is full of Timbaland-style production, booty-call ballads and even Spanish guitars. Sometimes being real means revealing the marshmallow within."

Ken Tucker, writing for Entertainment Weekly, gave the album a B− and wrote "David has a voice that's fresh and expressive, so it doesn't bode well that on what's only his second album, he's also an artist already reduced to singing about the burdens of fame." The Guardian's Alexis Petridis wrote "His second album has its flaws, but they are largely generic: when it tries to fit too snugly into the R&B template, it tails off. At its best, however, it is a curiously unique record."

== Track listing ==
No.	Title	Writer(s)	Producer(s)	Length
1.	"Slicker than Your Average"	Craig David; Trevor Henry; Anthony Marshall	Marshall & Trell	5:58
2.	"What's Your Flava?"	David; Henry; Marshall	Marshall & Trell	3:50
3.	"Fast Cars"	David; Henry; Marshall	Marshall & Trell	4:16
4.	"Hidden Agenda"	David; Mark Hill	Hill	3:54
5.	"Eenie Meenie" (featuring Messiah Bolical)	David; Henry; Leroy Williams; Adam Lyons	Marshall & Trell	5:04
6.	"You Don't Miss Your Water ('Til the Well Runs Dry)"	David; Hill	Hill; Soulshock^{[a]}; Peter Biker^{[a]}	5:20
7.	"Rise & Fall" (featuring Sting)	David; Gordon "Sting" Sumner; Dominic Miller	Soulshock and Karlin	4:47
8.	"Personal"	David; Henry; Marshall	Marshall & Trell	5:24
9.	"Hands Up in the Air"	David; Hill	Hill	4:05
10.	"2 Steps Back"	David; Carsten "Soulshock" Schack; Kenneth Karlin; Nate Butler; Jimmy Cozier; Harold Lilly	Soulshock and Karlin	3:48
11.	"Spanish" (featuring Duke One)	David; Henry; Marshall	Marshall	5:03
12.	"What's Changed" (featuring Katie Holmes)	David; Hill	Hill	4:41
13.	"World Filled with Love"	David; Fraser T Smith	David; Smith	3:45
Total length:				60:05

=== Bonus tracks ===
Japan version (bonus DVD)
No.	Title	Length
14.	"Four Times a Lady"	5:28
15.	"Come Together" (Live from Radio City Music Hall, New York City)	4:03
Total length:		69:36

UK version
No.	Title	Length
14.	"Say the Word"	4:53
Total length:		64:58

=== Other releases ===
Asian limited edition – bonus remix CD

1. "What's Your Flava?" (Todd's underground flava vocal remix)
2. "Hidden Agenda" (Blacksmith rerub featuring Know ?uestion)
3. "Hidden Agenda" (Soulshock remix)
4. "Four Times a Lady"
5. "Rise & Fall" (Blacksmith hiphop rub featuring Fallacy)
6. "Fill Me In" (acoustic recorded in Seoul)

DVD

1. "Fill Me In" (music video)
2. "7 Days" (music video)
3. "Walking Away" (music video)
4. "Rendezvous" (music video)
5. "What's Your Flava" (music video)
6. "Hidden Agenda" (music video)
7. "Rise & Fall" (music video)

Notes

- ^{^[a]} signifies remix and additional production.

Sample credits

- "Personal" contains an interpolation of "T Shirt and Panties" by Jamie Foxx.
- "Hidden Agenda" contains an interpolation of "Don't Talk" by Jon B.

== Personnel ==
Credits adapted from album's liner notes.

- Peter Biker – remix and additional producer (track 6)
- Messiah Bolical – vocals (track 5)
- Thomas Burbree – mixing (track 5), Pro Tools and post production (tracks 1–3, 5, 8)
- Craig David – vocals (all tracks), producer (track 13)
- Kevin "KD" Davis – mixing (track 12)
- Steve Fitzmaurice – mixing (tracks 4, 13)
- Marc Francs – mixing (track 3)
- Rob Haggett – second assistant engineer (tracks 6, 9)
- Trevor "Trell" Henry – producer (tracks 1–3, 5, 8), mixing (tracks 1–3, 8), rap (track 1)
- Mark Hill – producer (tracks 4, 6, 9, 12)
- Katie Holmes – additional vocals (track 12)
- Kenneth Karlin – producer and arranger (tracks 7, 10)
- Darryl Lavictoire – mixing (tracks 3, 8), mix engineer (tracks 1, 2)
- Manny Marroquin – mixing (tracks 7, 10)
- Anthony Marshall – producer (tracks 1–3, 5, 8, 11), mixing (tracks 1–3, 8, 11)
- Duke One – vocals (track 11)
- Onyxstone – Garage MCing (track 5)
- Fraser T. Smith – producer (track 13)
- Soulshock – producer, arranger, and mixing (tracks 7, 10), remix and additional production (track 6)
- Mark "Spike" Stent – mixing (tracks 6, 9)
- Sting – vocals (track 7)
- David Treahearn – assistant mixing (tracks 6, 9)
- Paul "P-Dub" Walton – Pro Tools (tracks 6, 9)

== Charts ==
=== Weekly charts ===
Weekly chart performance for Slicker Than Your Average
Chart (2002–03)	Peak position
Australian Albums (ARIA)	5
Australian Urban Albums (ARIA)	2
Belgian Albums (Ultratop Flanders)	15
Belgian Albums (Ultratop Wallonia)	8
Canadian Albums (Nielsen SoundScan)	34
Canadian R&B Albums (Nielsen SoundScan)	13
Danish Albums (Hitlisten)	32
Dutch Albums (Album Top 100)	19
European Top 100 Albums (Music & Media)	5
French Albums (SNEP)	6
German Albums (Offizielle Top 100)	16
Irish Albums (IRMA)	27
Italian Albums (FIMI)	11
Japanese Albums (Oricon)	8
New Zealand Albums (RMNZ)	20
Norwegian Albums (VG-lista)	27
Scottish Albums (Official Charts)	18
Swedish Albums (Sverigetopplistan)	26
Swiss Albums (Schweizer Hitparade)	6
UK Albums (Official Charts)	4
UK R&B Albums (Official Charts)	1
US Billboard 200	32
US Top R&B/Hip-Hop Albums (Billboard)	17

=== Year-end charts ===
2002 year-end chart performance for Slicker Than Your Average
Chart (2002)	Position
Australian Albums (ARIA)	69
Australian Urban Albums (ARIA)	16
Belgian Albums (Ultratop Flanders)	96
Canadian R&B Albums (Nielsen SoundScan)	47
French Albums (SNEP)	90
UK Albums (OCC)	77

2003 year-end chart performance for Slicker Than Your Average
Chart (2003)	Position
Australian Albums (ARIA)	56
Australian Urban Albums (ARIA)	8
Dutch Albums (Album Top 100)	77
French Albums (SNEP)	150
German Albums (Offizielle Top 100)	79
UK Albums (OCC)	60

== Certifications ==
Certifications of Slicker Than Your Average, with sales where available
Region	Certification	Certified units/sales
Australia (ARIA)	2× Platinum	140,000^{^}
Belgium (BRMA)	Gold	25,000^{*}
France (SNEP)	Gold	100,000^{*}
Germany (BVMI)	Gold	150,000^{^}
Netherlands (NVPI)	Gold	40,000^{^}
New Zealand (RMNZ)	Gold	7,500^{^}
Spain (Promusicae)	Gold	50,000^{^}
Switzerland (IFPI Switzerland)	Gold	20,000^{^}
United Kingdom (BPI)	2× Platinum	600,000^{^}
United States (RIAA)	Gold	500,000^{^}
Summaries
Europe (IFPI)	Platinum	1,000,000^{*}
^{*} Sales figures based on certification alone.^{^} Shipments figures based on certification alone.
