= Rise & Fall (Craig David song) =

2003 single by Craig David

Single by Craig David featuring Sting

from the album Slicker Than Your Average
- Released: 28 April 2003
- Length: 4:47
- Label: Wildstar
- Songwriters: Craig David; Gordon Sumner; Dominic Miller
- Producer: Soulshock and Karlin

Craig David singles chronology
"Hidden Agenda" (2003)	"Rise & Fall" (2003)	"Spanish" (2003)

Sting singles chronology
"After the Rain Has Fallen" (2000)	"Rise & Fall" (2003)	"Send Your Love" (2003)

Music video
- "Rise & Fall" on YouTube

"Rise & Fall" is a song by British singer Craig David. It was written for his second studio album, Slicker Than Your Average (2002), while production was helmed by duo Soulshock and Karlin. The song, a collaboration with fellow British musician Sting, is based on a sample of the song "Shape of My Heart" from Sting's 1993 album Ten Summoner's Tales. "Rise & Fall" served as the album's third single and returned David to the UK top five, peaking at number two on the UK Singles Chart. It also returned David to the top ten on the Australian Singles Chart. In Hungary, Poland, and Romania, "Rise & Fall" topped the singles charts. The song was also included in Sting's Duets (2021) compilation album.

== Chart performance ==
"Rise & Fall" charted at number two on the UK Singles Chart, spending ten weeks inside the top 75. It also charted at number six on the Australian Singles Chart.

== Music video ==
The music video was directed by Max & Dania, who have directed a number of Craig David's videos.

== Track listings ==
UK CD single
No.	Title	Writer(s)	Producer(s)	Length
1.	"Rise & Fall" (Video Edit) (featuring Sting)	Craig David; Gordon Sumner; Dominic Miller	Soulshock and Karlin	4:20
2.	"Rise & Fall" (Blacksmith Hip Hop Rub featuring Fallacy)	David; Sumner; Miller	Soulshock and Karlin; Blacksmith^{[a]}	3:32
3.	"Rise & Fall" (MJ Cole Remix)	David; Sumner; Miller	Soulshock and Karlin; MJ Cole^{[a]}	6:18
4.	"Rise & Fall" (Rishi Rich Desi Kulcha Remix featuring Juggy DMJ Cole)	David; Sumner; Miller	Soulshock and Karlin; Rishi Rich^{[a]}	5:00
5.	"Rise & Fall" (Video)			3:11

UK DVD single
No.	Title	Writer(s)	Producer(s)	Length
1.	"Rise & Fall" (Performance Video) (featuring Sting)
2.	"What's Changed" (Album Version) – (Audio + Picture Gallery)	David; Mark Hill	Hill
3.	"MTV Interview" (Video)

Notes

- ^{^[a]} signifies an additional producer

== Personnel ==
- Dick Beetham – mastering engineer
- Craig David – vocals, writer
- Manny Marroquin – mixing engineer
- Dominic Miller – writer
- Soulshock and Karlin – arranger, mixing, producer
- Sting – vocals, writer

== Charts ==
=== Weekly charts ===
Weekly chart performance for "Rise & Fall"
Chart (2003)	Peak position
Australia (ARIA)	6
Australian Urban (ARIA)	4
Austria (Ö3 Austria Top 40)	51
Belgium (Ultratop 50 Flanders)	17
Belgium (Ultratop 50 Wallonia)	17
Croatia (HRT)	4
Denmark (Tracklisten)	11
Europe (Eurochart Hot 100)	7
France (SNEP)	15
Germany (GfK)	15
Hungary (Rádiós Top 40)	1
Hungary (Single Top 40)	3
Ireland (IRMA)	5
Italy (FIMI)	9
Netherlands (Dutch Top 40)	9
Netherlands (Single Top 100)	7
Norway (VG-lista)	17
Poland (Polish Airplay Chart)	1
Portugal (AFP)	2
Romania (Romanian Top 100)	1
Scotland Singles (OCC)	4
Sweden (Sverigetopplistan)	35
Switzerland (Schweizer Hitparade)	11
UK Singles (OCC)	2
UK Airplay (Music Week)	3
UK Hip Hop/R&B (OCC)	1

=== Year-end charts ===
2003 year-end chart performance for "Rise & Fall"
Chart (2003)	Position
Australia (ARIA)	89
Belgium (Ultratop 50 Wallonia)	64
France (SNEP)	70
Italy (FIMI)	29
Netherlands (Dutch Top 40)	40
Netherlands (Single Top 100)	49
Romania (Romanian Top 100)	19
Switzerland (Schweizer Hitparade)	43
UK Singles (OCC)	57
UK Airplay (Music Week)	24

2004 year-end chart performance for "Rise & Fall"
Chart (2004)	Position
Hungary (Rádiós Top 40)	97

== Release history ==
Release history and formats for "Rise & Fall"
Region	Date	Format(s)	Label	Ref.
United Kingdom	28 April 2003	CD	Wildstar	
Japan	21 May 2003	CD	Telstar	
United States	2 June 2003	Contemporary hit; rhythmic contemporary; hot AC radio	Wildstar; Atlantic	

== See also ==
- List of Romanian Top 100 number ones of the 2000s
