= What's Your Flava? =

2002 single by Craig David

Single by Craig David

from the album Slicker Than Your Average
- B-side: "Four Times a Lady"
- Released: 28 October 2002
- Genre: R&B
- Length: 3:36
- Label: Wildstar
- Songwriters: Craig David; Trevor Henry; Anthony Marshall
- Producers: Marshall & Trell

Craig David singles chronology
"Rendezvous" (2001)	"What's Your Flava?" (2002)	"Hidden Agenda" (2003)

Music video
- "What's Your Flava?" on YouTube

"What's Your Flava?" is a song by British singer Craig David. It was released on 28 October 2002 as the first single from his second studio album, Slicker Than Your Average (2002). It peaked at number eight on the UK Singles Chart. Despite only peaking at number 104 on the US Billboard Hot 100, a much lower position than previous singles "Fill Me In" and "7 Days", it was included on the soundtrack for the 2003 American film What a Girl Wants.

In 2003, the song was used in a commercial for Mattel's unsuccessful Flavas dolls. In 2007, an edited and condensed version of the song was used for Popeyes Chicken commercials. There is a remix, featuring American rapper Twista.

== Chart performance ==
The single charted at No. 8 in the United Kingdom, tying with the previous single, "Rendezvous". It also charted at No. 9 in Canada, No. 10 in Australia, No. 22 in the Republic of Ireland and No. 4 on the Billboard Bubbling Under Hot 100 chart in the United States.

== Music video ==
The music video for "What's Your Flava?" was filmed in Prague and directed by Little X. Inspired by the 1971 film Willy Wonka and the Chocolate Factory, the story begins with a radio DJ announcing a contest giving fans the chance to tour David's music factory, provided they discover a golden CD inside his latest album Slicker Than Your Average. Four girls—from New York, Paris, London, and Toronto respectively—find the CDs with the Toronto girl discovering hers upon her first try while the others purchase multiple copies. They arrive at the factory, where David personally greets them at the gate and escorts them into the building.

As the tour continues, three of the girls are eliminated one by one for misbehaviour. The New York girl—symbolising narcissism—shoves David aside and performs for fame and clout in front a camera reminiscent of the Wonkavision transporter from the original film, ultimately getting sucked into the machinery. The Paris girl—representing materialism—becomes fixated on money as she and David float mid-air inside a cage, much to his frustration. The London girl—embodying lust—tries to seduce David on his Murphy bed, only to end up trapped in the wall when the bed folds upwards. Only Toronto—the perfect girl—remains, and she joins David in a glass elevator that carries them out of the factory in a finale echoing the film’s iconic ending.

== Track listings ==
Australia CD single

1. "What's Your Flava?" – 3:39
2. "Four Times a Lady" – 5:30
3. "What's Your Flava?" (instrumental) – 4:40

United Kingdom CD single

1. "What's Your Flava?" – 3:39
2. "Four Times a Lady" – 4:30
3. "What's Your Flava?" (instrumental) – 4:41

United States vinyl EP

- A1. "What's Your Flava?" (Radio Edit)
- A2. "What's Your Flava?" (Instrumental)
- A3. "What's Your Flava?" (A Capella)
- B1. "What's Your Flava?" (Todd's Underground Flava Mix: 2) Remix – Todd Edwards
- B2. "What's Your Flava?" (Todd's Underground Flava Mix: 1) Remix – Todd Edwards
- C1. "What's Your Flava?" (Ford's Rewinder Club Remix) Remix – Ford
- C2. "What's Your Flava?" (Ford's Rewinder Club Dub) Remix – Ford
- D1. "What's Your Flava?" (Akufen's Club Mix) Remix – Akufen
- D2. "What's Your Flava?" (Akufen's Dub Mix)

== Charts ==
=== Weekly charts ===
Weekly chart performance for "What's Your Flava?"
Chart (2002–2003)	Peak position
Australia (ARIA)	10
Australian Urban (ARIA)	5
Belgium (Ultratop 50 Flanders)	14
Belgium (Ultratop 50 Wallonia)	22
Canada (Nielsen SoundScan)	9
Croatia (HRT)	7
Denmark (Tracklisten)	11
Europe (Eurochart Hot 100)	15
France (SNEP)	20
Germany (GfK)	35
Hungary (Editors' Choice Top 40)	37
Ireland (IRMA)	22
Italy (FIMI)	12
Netherlands (Dutch Top 40)	24
Netherlands (Single Top 100)	12
New Zealand (Recorded Music NZ)	16
Norway (VG-lista)	17
Portugal (AFP)	8
Romania (Romanian Top 100)	24
Scottish Singles Sales (Official Charts)	14
Spain (Promusicae)	6
Sweden (Sverigetopplistan)	31
Switzerland (Schweizer Hitparade)	13
UK Singles (Official Charts)	8
UK Hip Hop/R&B (Official Charts)	3
US Bubbling Under Hot 100 (Billboard)	4
US Pop Airplay (Billboard)	24
US Rhythmic Airplay (Billboard)	32

=== Year-end charts ===
Year-end chart performance for "What's Your Flava?"
Chart (2002)	Position
Australia (ARIA)	63
Canada (Nielsen SoundScan)	46
UK Singles (OCC)	150

Chart (2003)	Position
Australia (ARIA)	82

== Certifications ==
Certifications and sales for "What's Your Flava?"
Region	Certification	Certified units/sales
Australia (ARIA)	Gold	35,000^{^}
^{^} Shipments figures based on certification alone.

== Release history ==
Release dates and formats for "What's Your Flava?"
Region	Date	Format(s)	Label(s)	Ref(s).
United States	7 October 2002	Contemporary hit; rhythmic contemporary radio]	Atlantic; Wildstar	
Australia	28 October 2002	CD1	Wildstar	
United Kingdom	28 October 2002	CD	Wildstar	
Australia	11 November 2002	CD2	Wildstar	
Japan	11 November 2002	CD	Telstar	
