= Craig David =

British singer (born 1981)

Craig David MBE
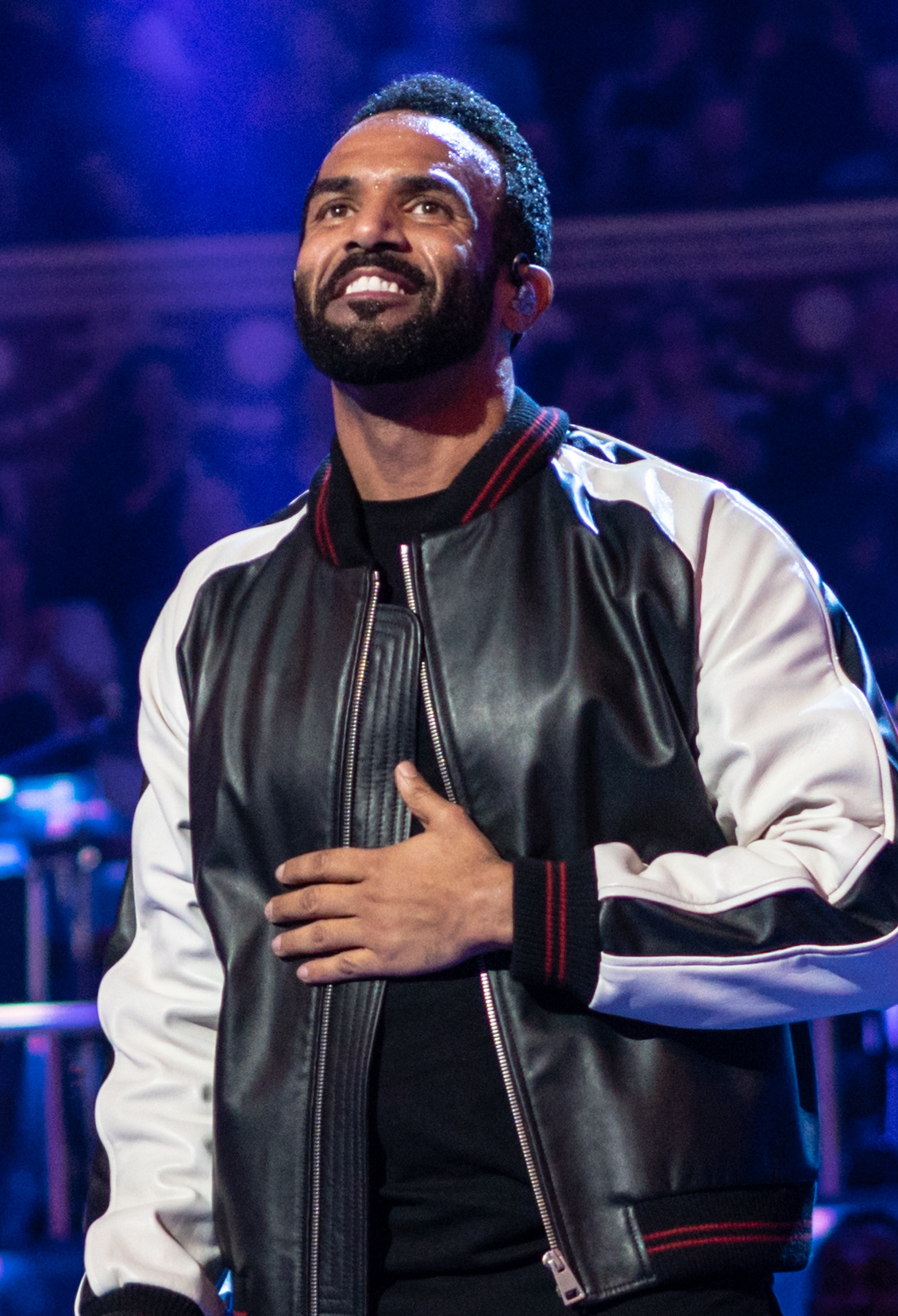
- David performing at The Queen's Birthday Party in April 2018

Background information
- Born: Craig Ashley David; 5 May 1981 (age 45); Southampton, Hampshire, England
- Genres: R&B; UK garage; house; pop; soul; hip hop; dance
- Occupations: Singer; songwriter; record producer; rapper; author; MC
- Instrument: Vocals
- Works: Craig David discography
- Years active: 1997–present
- Labels: Wildstar; Teacup; Warner Bros.; UMTV; Atlantic; Reprise; UMPG; Insanity; Speakerbox; BMG; RCA (former); independent (current)
- Website: craigdavid.com

Craig Ashley David MBE (born 5 May 1981) is an English singer. He rose to fame in 1999, featuring on the single "Re-Rewind" by Artful Dodger. David's debut studio album, Born to Do It, was released in 2000, to great commercial success. He followed it up with eight more studio albums: Slicker Than Your Average (2002), The Story Goes... (2005), Trust Me (2007), Signed Sealed Delivered (2010), Following My Intuition (2016), The Time Is Now (2018), 22 (2022), and Commitment (2025). Over his career, David has collaborated with a diverse array of artists, including Sting, Tinchy Stryder, Big Narstie, Tiwa Savage and JoJo.

== Early life ==
David was born in Southampton, Hampshire, the only child of Tina (née Loftus), a retail assistant at Superdrug, and George David, a carpenter, and grew up in the Holyrood estate. David's father is from Grenada in the Caribbean and David's mother is Anglo-Jewish and related to the founders of the Accurist watch-making company; David's maternal grandfather was an Orthodox Jew and his maternal grandmother a convert to Judaism. David's parents separated when he was eight and he was brought up by his mother.

He attended Bellemoor School and Southampton City College. David was bullied by other students at school. He wrote and released the song "Johnny" in 2005 about his memories of being bullied.

David's father, George David, played bass in a reggae band called Ebony Rockers. As a teen, David began accompanying his father to local dance clubs, where DJs let him take the microphone. He also began creating his own music and lyrics and working in youth and community clubs as an MC and DJ.

== Career ==
=== Early career ===
David's earliest exposure came when he worked on a B-side to British group Damage's cover of "Wonderful Tonight", on the track "I'm Ready". He then started doing vocals for the UK garage duo Artful Dodger, on tracks such as "Something" and "What Ya Gonna Do".

Wildstar Records first became aware of David when the artist's then manager Paul Widger met the label's co-owner Colin Lester and played some of his music. Lester later told HitQuarters that he was particularly impressed by the first song he heard, "Walking Away", saying "That was an absolute stand-out ... It struck me that any seventeen-year-old that could write a song like this had huge potential." The Wildstar boss was further won over when, on later visiting the artist's home in Southampton, he found David's tiny bedroom stacked from floor to ceiling with 12" vinyl records, commenting: "That convinced me he was the real deal and not just some kid acting out the part." At that point Lester offered him a development deal with his label. When Lester later heard the song "7 Days", he said he immediately heard a number-one record and promoted the contract to an album deal the same day.

=== 1999–2003: Born to Do It and Slicker Than Your Average ===
The song "Re-Rewind (The Crowd Say Bo Selecta)", from the Artful Dodger album It's All About the Stragglers, hit number two on the UK charts in 1999; thus, paving the way for a solo career. David's first single, "Fill Me In", released on Colin Lester's and Ian McAndrew's Wildstar Records, topped the UK chart and was the first of a string of four top 10 singles from his debut album Born to Do It, which eventually sold more than 8 million copies worldwide, earning multi-platinum status in more than 20 countries. The song "Key to My Heart", taken from the US version of the album, was also featured in the Warner Bros. animated film Osmosis Jones.

The success of David's debut, which was written almost entirely by David and Mark Hill of Artful Dodger, led to the United States release of "Fill Me In" in May 2001. It reached number 15 on the Billboard Hot 100 chart. Born to Do It was released in the United States on 17 July 2001, peaking at number 11 on the Billboard 200 chart and sold over 1 million copies. The single "7 Days" hit the top 10 in the U.S.; although "Walking Away", which had reached number 3 in the UK and number 5 in Australia, missed the top 40 in the U.S. and was the last of his singles to chart there.

In April 2009, MTV viewers voted Born to Do It as number 2 on their "Greatest Album of All Time" poll, behind Michael Jackson's Thriller.

The follow-up album, Slicker Than Your Average, was released in 2002. The album's first four singles continued David's streak of top 10 hits in the UK, bringing a total of nine consecutive top 10 hits until "World Filled with Love" peaked at number 15 in 2003. None of the six singles released from the album charted in the U.S. Although "What's Your Flava?" and "Rise & Fall" (duet with Sting) received airplay on the urban contemporary and soft adult contemporary formats, they did not make the Hot R&B/Hip-Hop Songs or Adult Contemporary charts. However, "What's Your Flava?" made the Rhythmic Top 40 chart (number 32), Mainstream Top 40 chart (number 24) and the Top 40 Tracks chart (number 37). According to the RIAA, Slicker Than Your Average was certified gold in the U.S.

David also commented that the album title could be looked at in two different ways: "On the one hand, it's coming across like I'm arrogant. On the other hand, it's saying I have a lot more composure on the album." The album was leaked onto the internet prior to its official release but David was not too bothered as he felt it "spreads the word".

=== 2005–2009: The Story Goes... and Trust Me ===
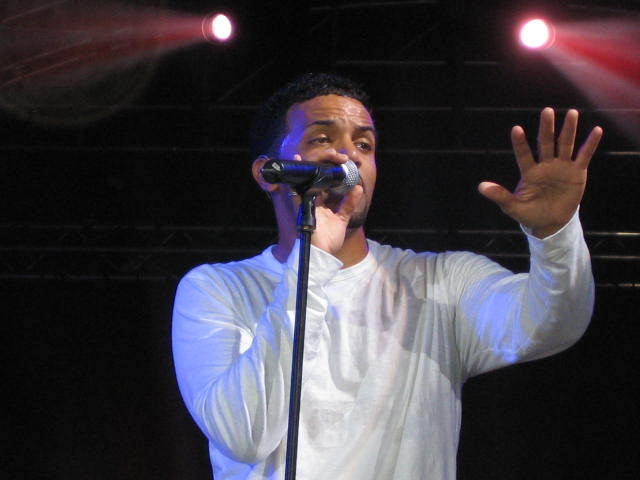
Live in London, 2005

David later signed on with Warner Music and put together his third album, The Story Goes..., which was released worldwide in August 2005 (excluding the U.S. where it was never released). The first single, "All the Way", returned him to the top 3. The second single, "Don't Love You No More (I'm Sorry)", tied with "7 Days" as his longest-running single in the charts since "Re-Rewind", spending 15 weeks inside the UK top 75. The album's third single, "Unbelievable", debuted at number 18 in March 2006.

In 2007, David collaborated with British rapper Kano on his album London Town, for the single "This Is the Girl". The track was released on 27 August 2007 and debuted at number 18 on the UK charts.

The first single from his album Trust Me, "Hot Stuff (Let's Dance)", was released on 5 November 2007. David successfully sought permission from David Bowie to sample his 1983 number-one single "Let's Dance". The single was a top ten hit, whilst the album charted at number 18 on the UK Albums Chart. "6 of 1 Thing", the second single to be taken from Trust Me, charted at number 39 on the UK Singles Chart, becoming his third-lowest-charting single to date.

"Officially Yours" was released on 23 June 2008 and peaked at number 158 on the UK Singles Chart, becoming his lowest-charting single to date and was the final single from Trust Me. In July, a new track titled "Are You Up for This" started receiving airplay on various radio stations as part of a promo with Ice Cream Records, which also featured a remix with Wittyboy called "Nutter Butter". On 17 August 2008, David performed at a birthday tribute concert for songwriter Don Black at the London Palladium. He performed the song "Ben", originally a hit for Michael Jackson.

David took part in Soccer Aid 2008 at Wembley Stadium on 7 September 2008. He picked up the "Man of The Match" award on the night and played in the same England side as ex-internationals such as Alan Shearer, Teddy Sheringham and David Seaman, and played against the likes of Romário, Paolo Di Canio, Jaap Stam and Luís Figo. David received two 2008 UK Urban Music Award nominations for Best Album with Trust Me and Best R&B Act. On 7 November 2008, David was recognised for his contribution to the music industry by receiving an honorary degree of Doctor of Music, from Southampton Solent University at a graduation ceremony held at Southampton Guildhall.

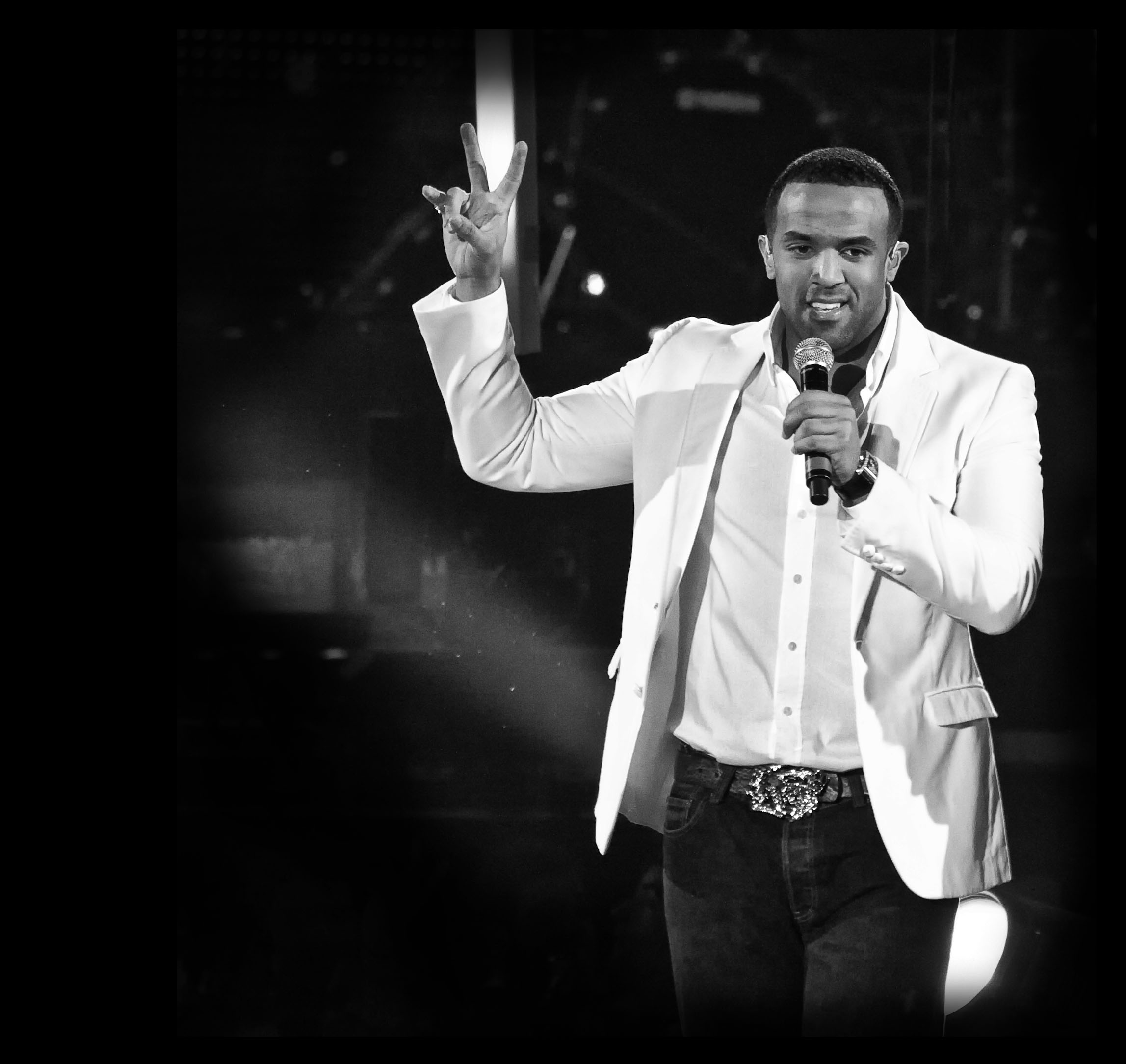
Live in Madrid, 2008

David released his first Greatest Hits album on 24 November 2008. In support of the release, David released two singles to promote the album. "Where's Your Love" featuring Tinchy Stryder and Rita Ora, a homage to his UK garage days, was digitally released on 10 November 2008. The second single, "Insomnia", produced by Jim Beanz from Timbaland productions, a dance track with hard bassline beats, was released the following week on 17 November 2008. Toby Gad and Eimear Crombie provided back-up vocals and instrumental stylings. David also started working with guitarist and recording engineer Kwame Yeboah, both live and in the studio.

On 29 December 2008, a new mix of "Insomnia", titled "Up All Night Mix", was made available for digital download. As part of the Greatest Hits compilation, David re-recorded "Walking Away" with four different artists across Europe: Monrose from Germany, Nek from Italy, Lynnsha from France and Álex Ubago from Spain. The album debuted at number 48 on the UK Albums Chart. From February to April 2009, David toured Russia, the Far East and performed one show in Los Angeles as part of a Greatest Hits tour. He met fans at a meet and greet session at Singapore Changi Airport before his show.

In April 2009, Born to Do It came second in a poll by MTV UK for the Greatest Album Ever, which received over 40,000 votes, beaten by Michael Jackson's album Thriller. On 14 May 2009, David participated in the Hillsborough Memorial football match at Anfield. On 26 July 2009, David participated in the Sir Bobby Robson Trophy match at St James' Park, playing alongside boyhood hero Alan Shearer.

=== 2009–2013: Signed Sealed Delivered and TS5 launch ===
On 18 September 2009, fans got the first taste of the new album with an exclusive demo posted on his official website, a thirty-second snippet covering Stevie Wonder's "Signed, Sealed, Delivered I'm Yours". On 2 October 2009, David revealed to his fans via Twitter and his website that he had signed a new record deal with Universal Motown. The UK edition of Jay Sean's new album All or Nothing which was released on 30 November 2009, features David on a track entitled "Stuck in the Middle". David performed a bold new cover of "I Wan'na Be Like You" from Walt Disney's 1967 film The Jungle Book on the ITV programme Ultimate Movie Toons, broadcast 28 March 2010. The first single from David's fifth studio album Signed Sealed Delivered was "One More Lie (Standing in the Shadows)" and it was released in the UK on 22 March 2010 where it made number 76 with the album following one week later on 29 March 2010, which entered the UK chart at number 13.

On 17 March 2010, David released a UK garage compilation album titled Rewind Old Skool Classics mixed with DJ Spoony featuring some of their favourite UK garage hits from the last ten years.

Two weeks later on 31 May 2010, the second single to be taken from Signed Sealed Delivered, titled "All Alone Tonight (Stop, Look, Listen)" was released. The chorus of the single samples the Stylistics' hit "Stop, Look, Listen (To Your Heart)" but features completely new verses. In the weeks leading up to the release, BBC Radio Two backed the single by naming it their 'Record of the Week' and adding it to their 'A-List'. On 20 May 2010, David appeared as a co-host on The Morning Show in Australia alongside Kylie Gillies, whilst regular male presenter Larry Emdur was on holiday. On 27 August 2010, Swiss DJ Remady released an album titled No Superstar on which David features on the track "Do It on My Own". David was nominated for 'Best Video' at the 2010 Urban Music Awards for the song "One More Lie (Standing in the Shadows)". The 2010 Sunday Times Rich List indicated that Craig David was worth £8 million.

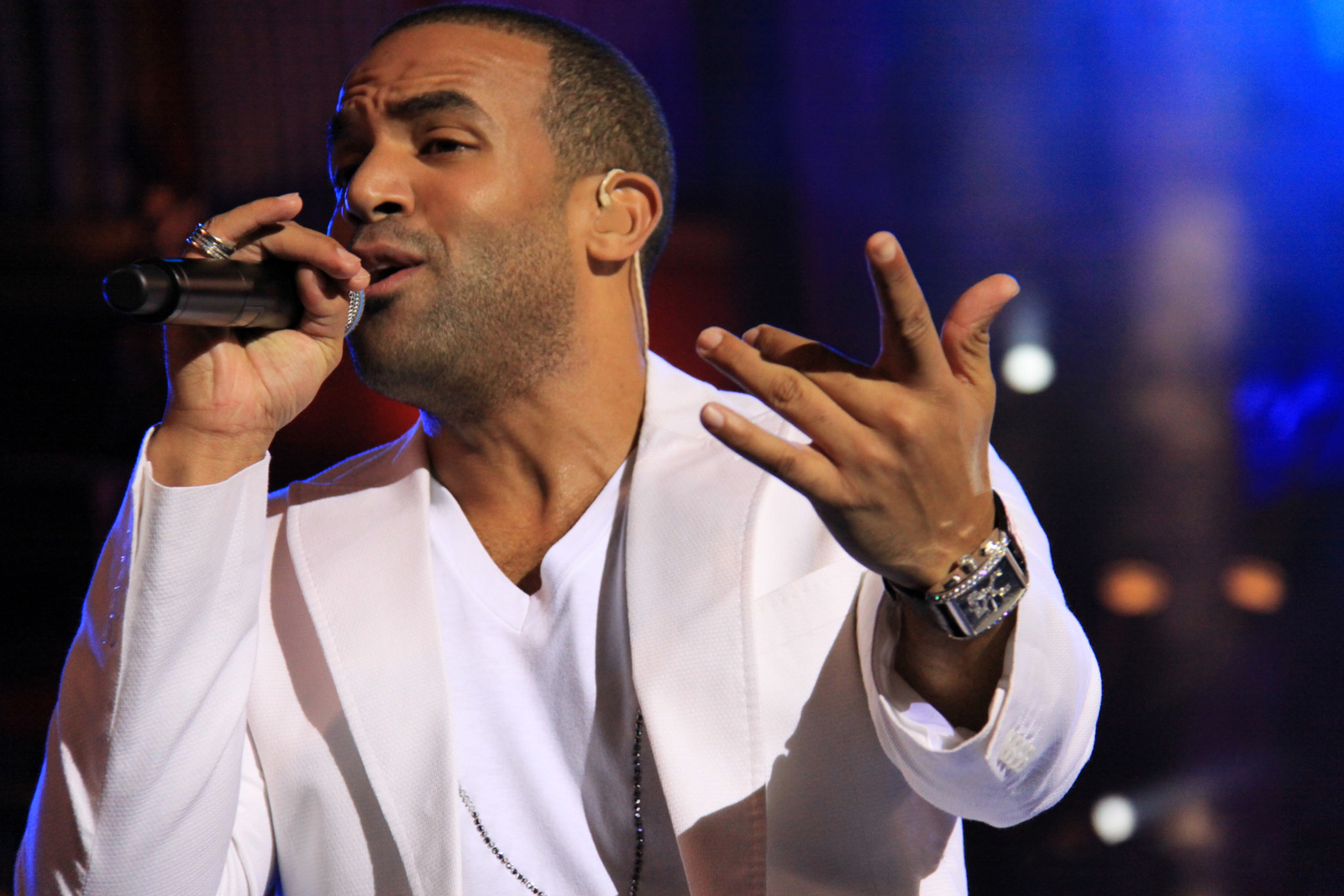
Live in Gran Canaria, 2009

David revealed on Twitter that he had worked with record producer Jim Beanz on material for his new album. He also tweeted about working with August Rigo and more recently Fraser T. Smith. Whilst doing a show in Russia, David confirmed he had left Universal Music Group and hopes to release his new album in America as well as the UK. In February 2011, David agreed to do a desert trek for Comic Relief as part of Red Nose Day 2011. A host of celebrities including Dermot O'Leary, Olly Murs and Lorraine Kelly trekked 100 kilometres across a Kenyan desert to raise money for preventable blindness across Africa.

In May 2011, David made a guest appearance on NRJ12's French reality TV show Les Anges 2 where he offered advice to contestants trying to make a life in Miami. Released on 1 August 2011, David featured on Erick Morillo's new mix CD Subliminal Invasion on the track "Fly Away". David performed at the Michael Jackson tribute concert, held in Cardiff at the Millennium Stadium on 8 October 2011.

Further to their earlier collaboration, David and Erick Morillo also canvassed a promotional track to DJs and radio stations titled "Get Drunk Up" and also featured it on YouTube. Morillo revealed David would appear on a project with Harry Romero and José Nunez, featuring a remix of the track. In December, he featured on the Blackout Mode dance track "Freak on the Dancefloor" that appeared on the compilation album R&B Collection 2012.

In 2012, David featured on a number of tracks whilst recording his own album, including releases with Stereo Palma titled "Our Love" and a collaboration with Mohombi and DJ Asaad titled "Addicted".

In July 2012, it was revealed David was writing with the Backstreet Boys on their 20th-anniversary album, the follow-up to their 2009 album This Is Us and the first they released since the return of Kevin Richardson who departed from the group in 2005.

In January 2013, David announced on Twitter that he had signed a publishing deal with Universal Music Publishing Group (UMPG). The deal saw David's publishing company, formally known as Bootyman Music Publishing merge to become JEM Music.

Starting in March 2013, David embarked on a world tour starting with three shows across Australia, followed by four in Europe (France, Belgium, Germany and the Netherlands) and finally finishing in May with four shows in England (Birmingham, Manchester, Southampton and London). In September 2013, Capital FM announced that David's DJ show 'TS5' would move to Capital Xtra every Friday evening from 10:00 pm.

=== 2014–2020: Following My Intuition and The Time Is Now ===
On 2 July 2014, David previewed a teaser track titled "Cold" on his official SoundCloud page. Premiering it on his TS5 radio show the week before, he wanted to preview some of the new music he has been working on in anticipation of his long-awaited sixth studio album. A further teaser track titled "Seduction" was uploaded to the same SoundCloud page in September 2014.

On 5 September 2015, David featured on BBC Radio 1's Live Lounge with Sigala where they covered Wiz Khalifa and Charlie Puth's "See You Again" mixed with the Little Mix track "Black Magic". The following week, on 10 September 2015, David appeared on Kurupt FM's 'Sixty Minute Takeover' on BBC Radio 1Xtra with MistaJam. He performed "Fill Me In" over the track "Where Are Ü Now" and it became a viral internet hit. Two snippets of potential new album tracks were also played on the night and this 1Xtra appearance led to David making surprise performances of the "Fill Me In" / "Where Are Ü Now" remix at Fabric with Kurupt FM and Alexandra Palace with Major Lazer and Diplo.

It was later revealed that the Radio 1Xtra appearance led to a collaboration between David and Big Narstie who also featured on the show and the track they recorded titled "When the Bassline Drops" was played on MistaJam's BBC Radio 1 and BBC Radio 1Xtra show on 7 November 2015, it was later revealed the track is to be released under SpeakerBox/JEM on 27 November 2015. David made a surprise appearance on The X Factor on 13 December 2015, where he performed his breakthrough single "Re-Rewind" during a medley with Reggie 'n' Bollie and Fuse ODG. "When the Bassline Drops" debuted at number 50 in the UK and peaked at number 10 on 5 February 2016, becoming David's highest-charting single since 2007.

On 25 January 2016, it was announced that Craig David had signed a recording contract with Insanity Records (a joint venture between Sony Music UK and Insanity Management) and independent company Speakerbox Media.

On 19 March 2016, at the second day of the Ultra Music Festival 2016, during the set of the Dutch DJ and record producer Hardwell, he appeared to present their new track "No Holding Back", which was released on 19 August 2016.

In 2016, David appeared on Kaytranada's album 99.9%, on the track "Got It Good", which he also co-wrote. This song also appeared on his sixth studio album. On 19 August 2016, Craig announced on social networks that his sixth studio album, Following My Intuition, would finally be released on 30 September 2016. It debuted at number one on the UK Albums Chart, giving David his first number-one album since his debut, Born to Do It, reached the top spot in 2000.

On 15 September 2017, David announced the release of the seventh studio album, The Time Is Now, which was released in January 2018, along with the single "Heartline".

On 23 November, David released his second single from The Time Is Now, "I Know You" featuring Bastille. David and Dan Smith from Bastille performed the song live a day later on Sounds Like Friday Night. The single peaked at number 5 in 2018, making it David's highest-charting single since "Don't Love You No More (I'm Sorry)" in 2005.

The Time Is Now debuted at number 2 on the UK Albums Chart, kept off the top spot by The Greatest Showman: Original Motion Picture Soundtrack.

On 31 May 2019, David released a new single "When You Know What Love Is" from his upcoming eighth album. In July, David made a cameo appearance in Love Island, performing the single as a DJ at a Ministry of Sound pool party.

His next UK garage single "Do You Miss Me Much" was released on 23 August 2019.

On 31 December 2019 and 1 January 2020, David performed on BBC One's New Year Live concert at Westminster Central Hall with his full band and TS5 DJ set.

=== 2021–2023: album 22 and book What's Your Vibe? ===
After appearing on KSI's BMG-released album All Over the Place, David went independent as a solo artist in order to release his new album.

In May 2021, he appeared on "Summertime", a single from People Just Do Nothing stars Kurupt FM, which appeared on their album The Greatest Hits (Part 1). In October, he scored a top 40 single with MNEK titled "Who You Are", which was produced by Digital Farm Animals and released by Moor in association with BMG.

David ended the year as one of the judges on new talent show Walk the Line. Debuting on ITV on 12 December 2021, David joined Gary Barlow, Dawn French and Alesha Dixon on the judging panel.

In June 2022, David performed at the Platinum Party at the Palace. In August 2022, he performed "7 Days", "Live in the Moment" and "Fill Me In" alongside Coldplay at Wembley Stadium.

On 30 September 2022, David released his eighth studio album, 22 via his own TS5 label and Moor Records under exclusive license to BMG. The album was preceded by and features singles "Who You Are" (featuring MNEK), "My Heart's Been Waiting for You" (featuring Duvall), "G Love" (featuring Nippa) and "DNA" (featuring Galantis). "Who You Are (Part 2)", "Who You Are" (Stripped) and "DNA (Part 2)" were also released as additional promotional singles.

On 6 October 2022, David released his first book titled What's Your Vibe?; upon announcing the book he stated: "For the past 2 years, I've been working on this book which isn't your typical memoir or self-help manual, but more of a place to share some of the lessons I've learnt over the years that have helped me navigate day to day life".

On 14 November 2022, music festival Camp Bestival announced their 2023 lineup, which included David, alongside Primal Scream, Melanie C, Grace Jones, the Kooks, the Human League and others.

On 23 February 2023, a 20th anniversary edition of his second album Slicker Than Your Average was released.

=== 2024-present: Commitment ===
In September 2024 David released the single "In Your Hands", based on the children's song "He's Got the Whole World in His Hands". On 17 January 2025, he released the single "SOS", which debuted and peaked at number 88 on the UK Singles Downloads Chart. On 26 February 2025, David released the single "Commitment", featuring Nigerian singer/songwriter Tiwa Savage. This release saw a slight improvement in commercial sales and streams - the single debuted and peaked at number 51 on the UK Singles Downloads Chart.

In April 2025, David featured in a Shelter film as part of a push for more social housing, returning to his childhood council home in Southampton. He stated, "Growing up in a social home meant everything to me. It wasn't just a place to live - it was a space where I felt secure, supported and able to be myself. The sense of community was so strong too. We looked out for each other and that made all the difference". He appeared on the 16 April 2025 episode of This Morning to discuss his visit to his childhood home, and spoke about his career.

On 16 April 2025, David announced the upcoming release of his ninth studio album, Commitment, with a slated date of 8 August 2025 On the day of the announcement, on 16 April 2025, David released the single "Wake Up". On 11 July 2025, his duet with American singer JoJo, "In It With You", was released. The album's sixth single, "Rain", followed on 4 August 2025.

== Publishing deals ==
On 9 September 2020, David signed a global publishing deal with New York-based Round Hill Music. The agreement includes all of David's music catalogue to date, and also includes a futures agreement that will see all of his new music administered by the company.

== Caricature on Bo' Selecta! ==
David was frequently caricatured by comedian Leigh Francis on the British TV comedy show Bo' Selecta!; the show's title itself being a reference to his song "Re-Rewind (The Crowd Say Bo Selecta)". Although many other celebrities lampooned in the series appreciated the jokes and even appeared in the series themselves, David—the series' most prominently mocked target—did not enjoy the attention, remarking that the public were no longer taking him seriously. Speaking to The Sunday Times in 2007, David said that "The whole Bo' Selecta! thing was killing me for a while because this idiot had a cult following and I was the main caricature. ... Inside it was absolutely pissing me off and hurtful beyond belief. There were times when I thought I just want to knock this guy out".

Although he made an appearance himself on the programme (as the pseudo-fictional tribute act "Craig Davis"), he regretted it. However, he has also denied that his career had been ruined as a result of the show, and has said that he was satisfied with his musical output over the years.

In a 2015 interview with the Daily Mirror, David stated that he had no hard feelings towards Francis, explaining how he had seen him at a wedding and given him a hug, assuring him they were "cool". He further explained in the interview that it was his PR team who suggested that he "play hurt" by the caricature. He reiterated this stance on The Jonathan Ross Show in 2016 and explained that, contrary to popular belief, he had not fled the UK to escape negative attention brought about from the show.

In June 2020, Francis apologised for his portrayal of David (among other black and mixed race celebrities such as Michael Jackson, Mel B and Trisha Goddard) in the show as a response to the Black Lives Matter movement and George Floyd protests, stating that "I want to say sorry for any upset I caused whether I was Michael Jackson, Craig David or Trisha Goddard... all people who I am a big fan of." Bo' Selecta! was removed from the video on demand service All 4 later that same month for similar reasons.

Contradicting his earlier comments, David raised the topic again in October 2022. "Every sketch felt personal," he told The Times. "It felt like a vendetta and when it got a following, it became something that affected me. People would shout at me on the street and I felt the same feeling I had when I was bullied at school. Leigh Francis had normalised bullying by making it comedy. When he put blackface on, that was being racist. We can all apologise when on the back foot. Has he reached out to any of the people he did on his show? He hasn't reached out to me. Has he gone to communities to talk about bullying? Racism? And to be educated? You can only ask him."

== Personal life and activism ==
David is Jewish.

He is an avid supporter of Southampton F.C., his hometown football team.

On 24 March 2010 (World Tuberculosis Day), the World Health Organization appointed Craig David as a Goodwill Ambassador against tuberculosis. His first activity in this role was to travel to South Africa to learn more about tuberculosis, where he met people suffering from the disease and those who have recovered, and scientists who have dedicated their lives to fighting tuberculosis. David stated that his mission is to help overcome the social stigma of TB in order to combat the disease. He has also been criticised by Action on Smoking and Health in 2013 for appearing in another Big Tobacco–funded appearance in Penang, Malaysia, where Japan Tobacco International sponsored a concert.

In January 2021 it was announced that Craig David would appear in an esports series in a campaign with McLaren and British American Tobacco (BAT) in order to enable them to reach their customers "in new, exciting and engaging ways" to push the nicotine pouch brand VELO. He appears in the series alongside other UK stars including presenter Rory Reid and Fred Sirieix.

In October 2022, David released a track titled "Better Days (I Came by Train)" in association with Trainline to encourage use of trains instead of flying or driving to lower CO_{2} emissions.

He revisited the council home he grew up in as part of a campaign with Shelter in 2025.

David has a small blue hat which he believes brings him luck.

== Discography ==
- Born to Do It (2000)
- Slicker Than Your Average (2002)
- The Story Goes... (2005)
- Trust Me (2007)
- Signed Sealed Delivered (2010)
- Following My Intuition (2016)
- The Time Is Now (2018)
- 22 (2022)
- Commitment (2025)

== Tours ==
Headlining

- Born to Do It "Off the Hook" Tour (2001)
- Slicker Than Your Average Tour (2003)
- The Story Goes... Tour (2006)
- Following My Intuition Tour (2017)
- The Time Is Now Tour (2018)
- Hold That Thought Tour (2022)
- Born to Do It World Tour (2027)

== Filmography ==
Television
| Year | Title | Role | Notes |
|---|---|---|---|
| 2018 | Turn Up Charlie | Himself | Season 1, Episode 2 |
| 2018 | The Big Narstie Show | Guest | Season 1, Episode 2 |
| 2020 | The Graham Norton Show | Musical Guest | Season 26, Episode 15 |

== Honours and awards ==
On 30 December 2020, it was announced that in the Queen's New Year Honours List David had been appointed as MBE in recognition of his services to music. His manager Colin Lester was also appointed OBE in recognition of his services to the music industry and to charity. David received his award at Windsor Castle on 15 December 2021.
