= Nek discography =

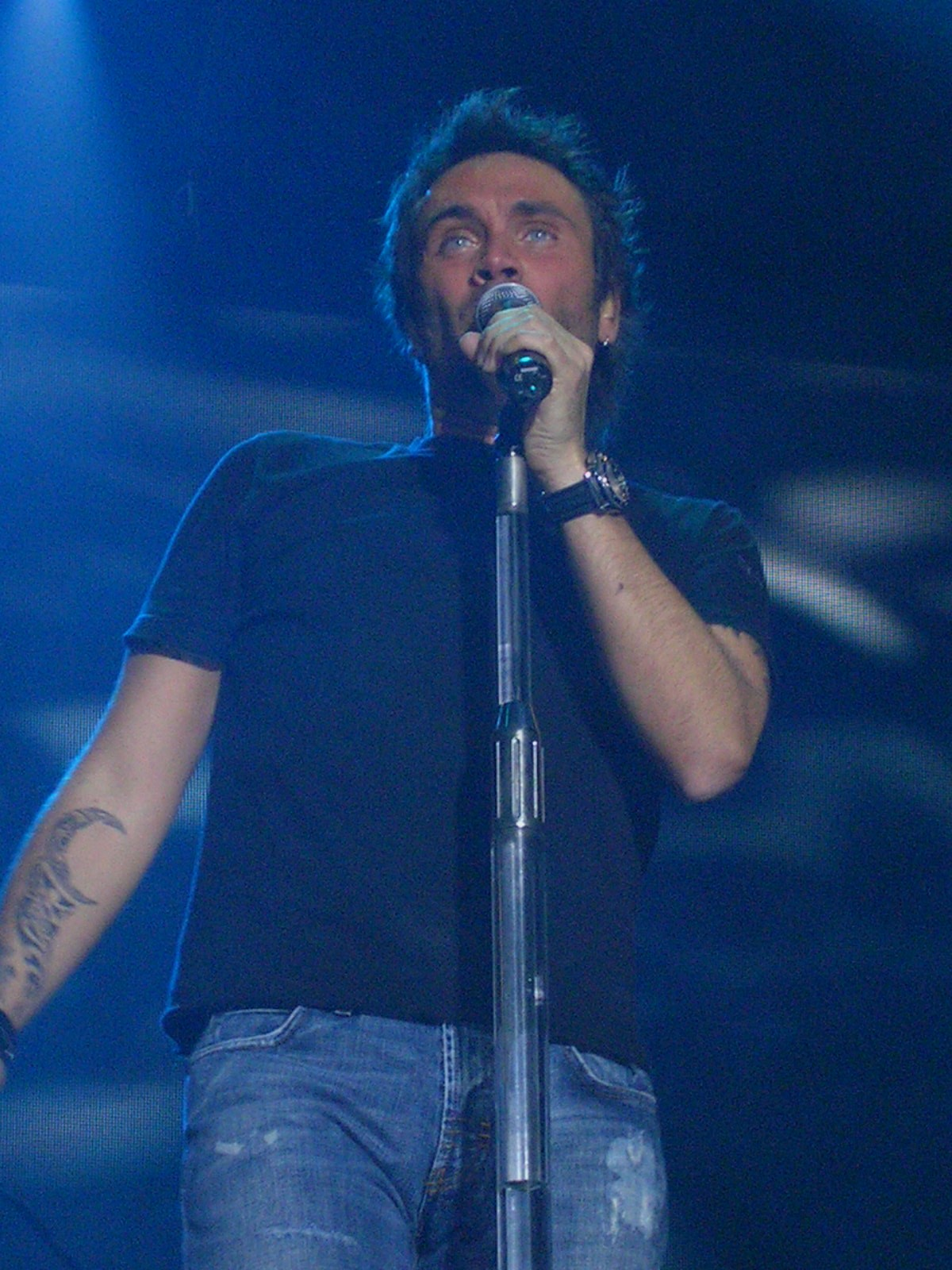
- Studio albums: 13
- Compilation albums: 5
- Singles: 48

The discography of Nek, an Italian pop rock singer, contains thirteen Italian-language studio album, nine Spanish-language studio albums, five Italian and Spanish compilation albums, and forty-eight singles.

Nek's debut album, the self-titled Nek, was released by Fonit Cetra in Italy in 1992 after he had come in second at the Castrocaro Song Festival. In 1993 Nek released his second album In te followed by his third album Calore umano in the summer of 1994. In 1997 he took part in the Sanremo Music Festival, in the "Star" category, with the song "Laura non c'è" which reached number one on the Italian Singles Chart and went on to become his international breakthrough as it reached the Top Ten in Germany, Switzerland, Austria and Belgium. Lei, gli amici e tutto il resto, his fourth album and his first for WEA/Warner Music, went on to sell two million copies worldwide and was his first album to also be recorded in a Spanish-language version.

Nek's fifth album, In due was released in June 1998 and he followed it with La vita è in 2000 and Le cose da difendere in 2002. Nek celebrated his first ten years as a recording artist with The Best of Nek: L'anno zero in October 2003. The album sold over 300,000 copies in Italy alone, and soared to the top of the charts, where it stayed for 11 weeks in the Top 10. All of Nek's studio albums since 1997 have reached the Top 10 on the Italian Albums Chart. Una parte di me, which was released in May 2005, sold over 200,000 copies in Italy and included the hit single "Lascia che io sia", one of the Top Ten best-selling singles of 2005 in Italy. Nek released his 10th album Nella stanza 26 in 2006, and in 2007 he recorded a new version of the Spanish-language version of "Lascia che io sia", titled "Para ti seria", with the Spanish band El Sueño de Morfeo, which was hugely successful on Spanish Download chart and sold more than 250,000 downloads.

Another international collaboration followed in 2008 when he recorded a duet version of "Walking Away" with Craig David, which was included on Nek's tenth studio album Un'altra direzione, which became his first number-one album on FIMI's Italian Albums Chart. In November 2010 Nek celebrated his first twenty years as an artist with the compilation album Greatest Hits 1992–2010: E da qui.

== Albums ==
=== Studio albums ===
List of albums, with selected chart positions and certifications
Title	Album details	Peak chart positions									Certifications
Title	Album details	ITA	AUT	FIN	FRA	GER	SPA	SWE	SWI	US Latin	Certifications
Nek	Released: 1992; Labels: Fonit Cetra; Formats: LP, CD, Musicassette	—	—	—	—	—	—	—	—	—	
In te	Released: 1993; Labels: Fonit Cetra; Formats: LP, CD, Musicassette	—	—	—	—	—	—	—	—	—	
Calore umano	Released: 27 September 1994; Labels: Fonit Cetra; Formats: CD, Musicassette	—	—	—	—	—	—	—	—	—	
Lei, gli amici e tutto il resto / Nek	Released: 21 February 1997; Labels: Don't Worry / WEA; Formats: CD, Musicassette	3	2	17	55	14	4	36	24	27	ITA: 6×Platinum; SPA: 3×Platinum; MEX: Gold; SWI: Platinum; ARG: Gold; AUT: Gold
In due / Entre tú y yo	Released: 28 May 1998 15 September 1998 (Spanish); Labels: Don't Worry / WEA; Formats: CD, Musicassette	2	3	—	—	17	9	—	2	—	ITA: 3×Platinum; SPA: Platinum; ARG: Gold; SWI: Gold; AUT: Gold
La vita è / La vida es	Released: 2 June 2000 11 July 2000 (Spanish); Labels: Don't Worry / WEA; Formats: CD, Musicassette	8	30	—	—	31	33	—	6	44	ITA: 2xPlatinum
Le cose da difendere / Las cosas que defenderé	Released: 24 May 2002 28 May 2002 (Spanish); Labels: Don't Worry / WEA; Formats: CD, Musicassette	4	67	—	81	34	48	—	16	—	ITA: Platinum; SWI: Gold
Una parte di me/ Una parte de mí	Released: 13 May 2005 7 June 2005 (Spanish); Labels: Warner Bros.; Formats: CD, digital download	3	46	—	170	75	34	—	3	—	ITA: 2xPlatinum; SWI: Gold
Nella stanza 26 / En el cuarto 26	Released: 17 November 2006 3 April 2007 (Spanish); Labels: Warner Bros.; Formats: CD, digital download	5	—	—	—	—	56	—	5	—	ITA: 2×Platinum
Un'altra direzione / Nuevas direcciones	Released: 30 January 2009 28 April 2009 (Spanish); Labels: Warner Bros.; Formats: CD, digital download	1	—	—	—	—	25	—	3	—	ITA: Platinum
Filippo Neviani	Released: 16 April 2013; Labels: Warner Bros.; Formats: CD, digital download	2	—	—	—	—	30	—	16	—	
Prima di parlare / Antes de que hables	Released: 3 March 2015 19 June 2015 (Spanish); Labels: Warner Bros.; Formats: CD, digital download	3	—	—	—	—	75	—	14	—	ITA: Platinum
Unici / Unicos	Released: 14 October 2016; Labels: Warner Bros.; Formats: CD, digital download, LP	2	—	—	—	—	90	—	22	—	ITA: Gold
Il mio gioco preferito – Parte prima	Released: 10 May 2019; Labels: Warner Music Italy; Formats: CD, digital download, LP	3	—	—	—	—	—	—	27	—	
Il mio gioco preferito – Parte seconda	Released: 29 May 2020; Labels: Warner Music Italy; Formats: CD, digital download	3	—	—	—	—	—	—	25	—	
"—" denotes albums that did not chart or were not released

=== Compilation albums ===
Title	Album details	Peak chart positions			Certifications
Title	Album details	ITA	SPA	SWI	Certifications
Stai con me	Released: 1997; Labels: Hommage; Formats: CD, Musicassette	—	—	—	
The Best of Nek: L'anno zero / Lo mejor de Nek: El año cero	Released: 10 October 2003; Labels: WEA; Formats: CD, digital download, Musicassette	3	14	12	ITA: 3× Platinum
Esencial	Released: 23 May 2006; Labels: Warner Music Latina; Formats: CD, digital download	—	—	—	
Greatest Hits 1992–2010: E da qui / Greatest Hits 1992-2010: Es así	Released: 16 November 2010; Labels: Warner Music; Formats: CD, digital download	7	—	29	ITA: Platinum
5030	Released: 2 December 2022; Labels: Warner Music; Formats: CD, digital download	21	—	—	
"—" denotes albums that did not chart or were not released

=== Collaborative albums ===
Title	Album details	Peak chart positions			Certifications
Title	Album details	ITA	NZ	SPA	Certifications
The Ballroom	with Dance Floor Virus; Released: 1995; Labels: Dance Pool; Formats: CD, Musicassette, LP	—	41	—	
Max Nek Renga - Il disco	with Max Pezzali & Francesco Renga; Released: 9 March 2018; Label: Warner Music Italy; Formats: CD, LP	3	—	—	FIMI: Gold
RengaNek	with Francesco Renga; Released: 8 September 2023; Label: Epic; Formats: CD, LP	3	—	—	
"—" denotes albums that did not chart or were not released

== Singles ==
=== As lead artist ===
List of singles, with selected chart positions, showing year released and album name
Single	Year	Peak chart positions									Certifications	Album
Single	Year	ITA	AUT	BEL (WA)	FRA	GER	SPA	SWI	UK	US Latin	Certifications	Album
"Amami"	1992	—	—	—	—	—	—	—	—	—		Nek
"In te"	1993	—	—	—	—	—	—	—	—	—		In te
"Uomo con te"	1993	—	—	—	—	—	—	—	—	—		In te
"Calore umano"	1994	—	—	—	—	—	—	—	—	—		Calore umano
"Angeli nel ghetto"	1994	—	—	—	—	—	—	—	—	—		Calore umano
"Cuori in tempesta"	1994	—	—	—	—	—	—	—	—	—		Calore umano
"Tu sei, tu sai"	1996	—	—	—	—	—	—	—	—	—		Lei, gli amici e tutto il resto / Nek (1997)
"Vivere senza te" / Cómo vivir sin ti"	1996	—	—	—	—	—	—	—	—	—		Lei, gli amici e tutto il resto / Nek (1997)
"Fianco a fianco"	1996	—	—	—	—	—	—	—	—	—		Lei, gli amici e tutto il resto / Nek (1997)
"Laura non c'è" / "Laura no está"	1997	1	3	7	11	10	6	2	59	21	FIMI: Gold; SNEP: Gold	Lei, gli amici e tutto il resto / Nek (1997)
"Sei grande" / "Tu nombre"	1997	1	—	—	—	—	6	—	—	—		Lei, gli amici e tutto il resto / Nek (1997)
"Dimmi cos'è"	1997	—	—	32	—	—	—	—	—	—		Lei, gli amici e tutto il resto / Nek (1997)
"Espérame"	1997	—	—	—	—	—	—	—	—	—		Lei, gli amici e tutto il resto / Nek (1997)
"Se io non avessi te" / "Si sé que te tengo a ti"	1998	—	—	—	—	73	—	—	—	—		In due / Entre tú y yo
"Sto con te" / "Quédate"	1998	—	—	—	—	—	—	—	—	—		In due / Entre tú y yo
"Se una regola c'è" / "No preguntes por qué"	1998	—	—	—	—	84	—	—	—	—		In due / Entre tú y yo
"Con un ma e con un se" / "Su tal vez, su quizá"	1998	—	29	—	—	82	—	—	—	—		In due / Entre tú y yo
"Ci sei tu" / "Llegas tú"	2000	9	—	—	—	83	—	58	—	—		La vita è / La vida es
"Sul treno" / "En el tren"	2000	—	—	—	—	—	—	—	—	—		La vita è / La vida es
"La vita è" / "La vida es"	2000	26	—	—	—	100	—	—	—	—		La vita è / La vida es
"Lleno de energìa"	2000	—	—	—	—	—	—	—	—	—		La vita è / La vida es
"Sei solo tu" / "Tan sólo tú" (featuring Laura Pausini)	2002	3	—	—	55	—	—	46	—	36		Le cose da difendere / Las cosas que defenderé
"Parliamo al singolare" / "Hablemos en pasado"	2002	—	—	—	—	—	—	—	—	—		Le cose da difendere / Las cosas que defenderé
"Cielo e terra" / "Cielo y tierra"	2002	32	—	—	—	—	—	—	—	—		Le cose da difendere / Las cosas que defenderé
"Las cosas que defenderé"	2002	—	—	—	—	—	—	—	—	—		Le cose da difendere / Las cosas que defenderé
"Tutto di te"	2003	—	—	—	—	—	—	—	—	—		Le cose da difendere / Las cosas que defenderé
"Almeno stavolta" / "Al menos ahora"	2003	5	—	—	—	—	—	43	—	—		The Best of Nek: L'anno zero / Lo mejor de Nek: El año cero
"L'anno zero" / "El año cero"	2003	—	—	—	—	—	—	—	—	—		The Best of Nek: L'anno zero / Lo mejor de Nek: El año cero
"Lascia che io sia" / "Para ti sería"	2005	2	—	—	—	—	—	38	—	—	FIMI: Gold	Una parte di me / Una parte de mí
"Contromano" / "A contramano"	2005	—	—	—	—	—	—	—	—	—		Una parte di me / Una parte de mí
"L'inquietudine" / "La inquietud"	2006	—	—	—	—	—	—	—	—	—		Una parte di me / Una parte de mí
"Instabile" / "Vértigo"	2006	8	—	—	—	—	—	47	—	—		Nella stanza 26 / En el cuarto 26
"Notte di febbraio" / "Noche de febrero"	2007	—	—	—	—	—	—	—	—	—		Nella stanza 26 / En el cuarto 26
"Nella stanza 26" / "En el cuarto 26"	2007	—	—	—	—	—	—	—	—	—		Nella stanza 26 / En el cuarto 26
"La voglia che non vorrei" / "Deseo que ya no puede ser"	2009	9	—	—	—	—	37	53	—	—		Un'altra direzione / Nuevas direcciones
"Se non ami" / "Si no amas"	2009	40	—	—	—	—	—	—	—	—		Un'altra direzione / Nuevas direcciones
"Semplici emozioni" / "Simples emociones"	2009	—	—	—	—	—	—	—	—	—		Un'altra direzione / Nuevas direcciones
"E da qui" / "Es así"	2010	24	—	—	—	—	—	—	—	—		Greatest Hits 1992–2010: E da qui / Greatest Hits 1992-2010: Es así
"Vulnerabile"	2011	—	—	—	—	—	—	—	—	—		Greatest Hits 1992–2010: E da qui / Greatest Hits 1992-2010: Es así
"È con te" / "Para tí"	2011	—	—	—	—	—	—	—	—	—		Greatest Hits 1992–2010: E da qui / Greatest Hits 1992-2010: Es así
"Neroverdi"	2013	—	—	—	—	—	—	—	—	—		
"Congiunzione astrale" / "Conjunción astral"	2013	39	—	—	—	—	—	—	—	—		Filippo Neviani
"La metà di niente" / "La mitad de nada"	2013	70	—	—	—	—	—	—	—	—		Filippo Neviani
"Hey Dio" / "Hey Dios"	2014	—	—	—	—	—	—	—	—	—		Filippo Neviani
"Fatti avanti amore" / "Sigue hacia adelante"	2015	3	—	—	—	—	—	39	—	—	FIMI: Platinum	Prima di parlare / Antes de que hables
"Se telefonando"	2015	34	—	—	—	—	—	—	—	—	FIMI: Platinum	Prima di parlare / Antes de que hables
"Io ricomincerei"	2015	—	—	—	—	—	—	—	—	—		Prima di parlare / Antes de que hables
"Uno di questi giorni"	2016	49	—	—	—	—	—	—	—	—	FIMI: Gold	Unici
"Unici"	2016	61	—	—	—	—	—	—	—	—	FIMI: Gold	Unici
"Differente"	2016	—	—	—	—	—	—	—	—	—	FIMI: Gold	Unici
"Freud" (feat. J-Ax)	2017	59	—	—	—	—	—	—	—	—	FIMI: Platinum	Unici
"Mi farò trovare pronto"	2019	41	—	—	—	—	—	—	—	—		Il mio gioco preferito – Parte prima
"La storia del mondo"	2019	—	—	—	—	—	—	—	—	—		Il mio gioco preferito – Parte prima
"Sube la radio"	2019	—	—	—	—	—	—	—	—	—		Il mio gioco preferito – Parte prima
"Pazzo di te"	2025	32	—	—	—	—	—	—	—	—		Renganek
"—" denotes singles that did not chart or were not released.

=== As featured artist ===
List of singles, with selected chart positions, showing year released and album name
Single	Year	Peak chart positions						Certifications	Album
Single	Year	ITA	BEL (WA)	FRA	SPA	SWI	UK	Certifications	Album
"Message in a Bottle" (Dance Floor Virus featuring Nek)	1995	—	—	—	2	—	49		The Ballroom
"Don't Stand So Close to Me" (Dance Floor Virus featuring Nek)	1995	—	—	—	6	—	—		The Ballroom
"Dedododo Dedadada" (Dance Floor Virus featuring Nek)	1995	—	—	—	—	—	—		The Ballroom
"Laura (Laura non c'è)"^{[A]} (Cérena featuring Nek)	2005	—	42	16	—	21	—		Cérena
"Walking Away" (Craig David featuring Nek)	2008	14	—	—	—	—	—		Greatest Hits
"Chocar" (El Sueno de Morfeo featuring Nek)	2008	—	—	—	—	—	—		Nos vemos en el camino
"Domani 21/04.09" (Artisti Uniti per l'Abruzzo)	2009	1	—	—	—	—	—	FIMI: 2× Platinum	Charity Single
"Eclissi del cuore" (L'Aura featuring Nek)	2011	5	—	—	—	—	—	FIMI: Platinum	Sei come me
"Duri da battere" (Max Pezzali feat. Nek & Francesco Renga)	2017	—	—	—	—	—	—		Le canzoni alla radio
"Strada facendo" (Max, Nek, Renga)	2018	—	—	—	—	—	—		Max Nek Renga - Il disco
"Gli anni" (Max, Nek, Renga)	2018	—	—	—	—	—	—		Max Nek Renga - Il disco
"Fatti avanti amore" (Max, Nek, Renga)	2018	—	—	—	—	—	—		Max Nek Renga - Il disco
"Il mio giorno più bello nel mondo" (Max, Nek, Renga)	2018	—	—	—	—	—	—		Max Nek Renga - Il disco
"—" denotes singles that did not chart or were not released

=== Other charted songs ===
List of songs with chart positions, year released and album name
Single	Year	Peaks	Album
Single	Year	ITA	Album
"Anni luce" (J-Ax and Fedez featuring Nek)	2017	58	Comunisti col Rolex

== Guest appearances ==
List of non-single guest appearances, showing year released and album name
Song	Year	Album
"Non c'è" / "Se fue" (2001 version) (Laura Pausini featuring Nek playing bass)	2001	The Best of Laura Pausini: E ritorno da te
"Happy Christmas" (live)	2005	It's Christmas: Live from the Vatican
"Con la terra sotto di me" (live)	2005	It's Christmas: Live from the Vatican
"Almeno stavolta" (live)	2005	Live 8 Roma
"Se io non avessi te" (live)	2005	Live 8 Roma
"Lascia che io sia" (live)	2005	Live 8 Roma
"Sì, viaggiare" (Lucio Battisti cover)	2006	Innocenti evasioni 2006
"Come non si fa" (Claudio Baglioni featuring Roy Paci playing trumpet and Nek playing guitar)	2009	Q.P.G.A.
"Levántate" (Marta Sánchez featuring Nek)	2010	De par en par
"Nessun rimpianto" (Max Pezzali featuring Nek)	2013	Max 20
"Anni luce" (J-Ax and Fedez featuring Nek)	2017	Comunisti col Rolex
"Rossana" (Cristina D'Avena featuring Nek)	2018	Duets Forever

== Notes ==
- A "Laura (Laura non c'è)" did not enter the Ultratop 50, but peaked at number 2 on the Wallonia Ultratip chart, which acts as an extension to the Ultratop 40.
