= List of awards and nominations received by Craig David =

Craig David awards and nominations
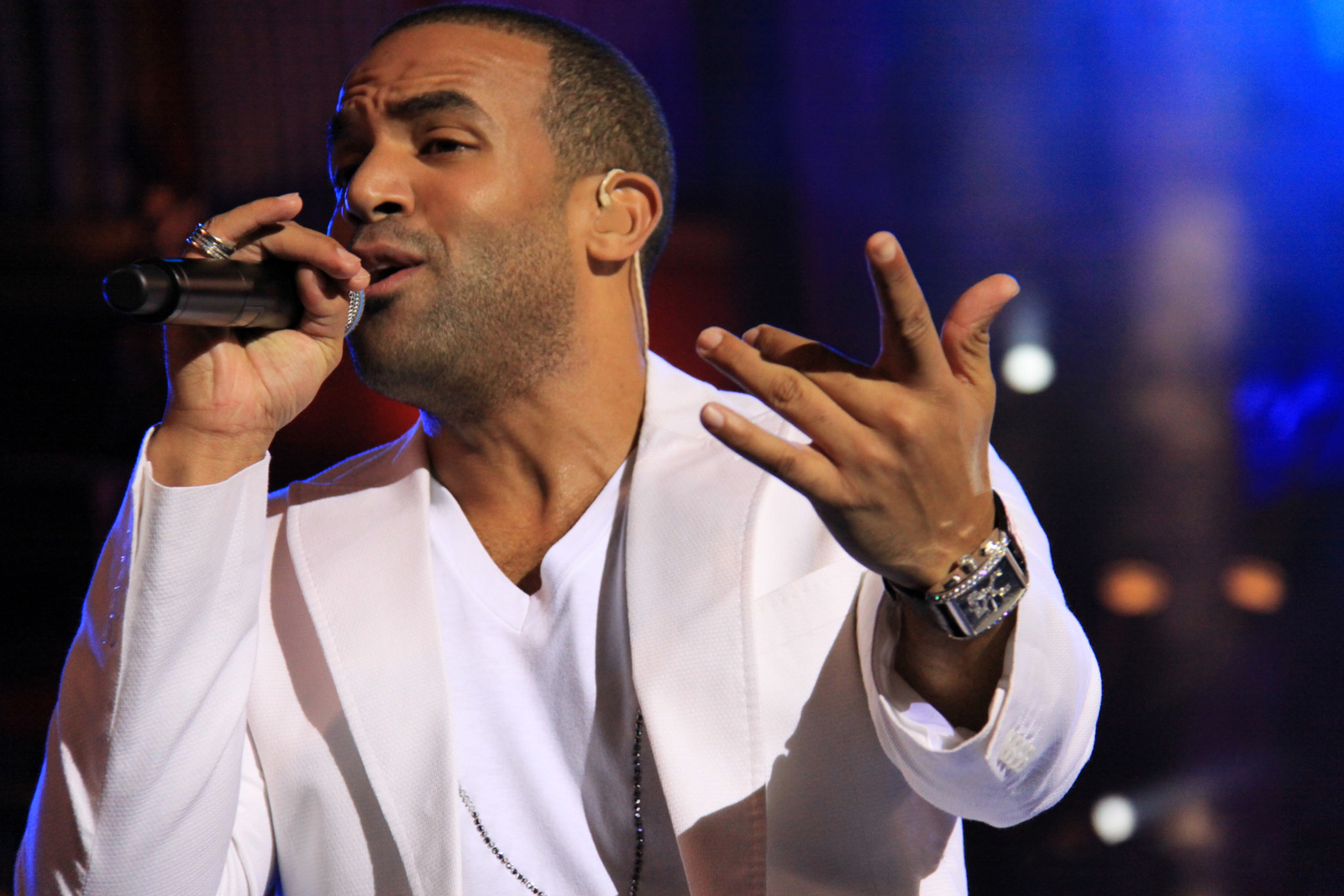
- David performing in Gran Canaria, 2009
Awards and nominations
Award	Wins	Nominations
BET	0	3
Brit	0	14
Grammy	0	2
MOBO	5	10
MTV Europe	2	4
MTV VMA	0	2

Totals (Note: Certain award groups do not simply award one winner. They acknowledge several different recipients, have runners-up, and have third place. Since this is a specific recognition and is different from losing an award, runner-up mentions are considered wins in this award tally. For simplification and to avoid errors, each award in this list has been presumed to have had a prior nomination.)
- Wins: 12
- Nominations: 43

The following is a list of awards and nominations received by English singer Craig David. He has earned 12 awards from 43 nominations.

== BET Awards ==
Year	Nominee / work	Award	Result
2002	Craig David	Best New Artist	Nominated
2002	Craig David	Best Male R&B Artist	Nominated
2017	Craig David	Best International Act: Europe	Nominated

== Brit Awards ==
Year	Nominee / work	Award	Result
2001	Craig David	British Breakthrough Act	Nominated
2001	Craig David	British Male Solo Artist	Nominated
2001	Craig David	British Dance Act	Nominated
2001	"7 Days"	British Single of the Year	Nominated
2001	"7 Days"	British Video of the Year	Nominated
2001	Born to Do It	British Album of the Year	Nominated
2002	Born to Do It	British Album of the Year	Nominated
2002	Craig David	British Dance Act	Nominated
2002	Craig David	British Male Solo Artist	Nominated
2003	Craig David	British Male Solo Artist	Nominated
2003	Craig David	British Urban Act	Nominated
2006	Craig David	British Urban Act	Nominated
2017	Craig David	British Male Solo Artist	Nominated
2019	Craig David	British Male Solo Artist	Nominated

== GAFFA Awards ==
=== Denmark GAFFA Awards ===
Delivered since 1991, the GAFFA Awards are a Danish award that rewards popular music by the magazine of the same name.

Year	Nominee / work	Award	Result	Ref.
2000	Himself	Best Foreign New Act	Nominated	

== Goldene Kamera ==
Year	Nominee / work	Award	Result
2004	Craig David	Pop International	Won

== Grammy Awards ==
Year	Nominee / work	Award	Result
2002	"Fill Me In"	Best Male Pop Vocal Performance	Nominated
2003	"7 Days"	Best Male Pop Vocal Performance	Nominated

== Ivor Novello Awards ==
Year	Nominee / work	Award	Result
2001	"7 Days"	Best Contemporary Song	Won
2001	"Woman Trouble" (with Robbie Craig and Artful Dodger)	Best Dance Single	Won
2001	Craig David (with Mark Hill	Songwriter of the Year	Won

== MOBO Awards ==
Year	Nominee / work	Award	Result
2000	Craig David	Best UK Newcomer	Won
2000	Craig David	Best R&B Act	Won
2000	"Fill Me In"	Best UK Single of the Year	Won
2000	"Woman Trouble" (with Robbie Craig and Artful Dodger)	Best UK Single of the Year	Nominated
2000	"7 Days"	Best Video	Nominated
2001	Craig David	Best UK Act	Won
2001	Craig David	Best R&B Act	Nominated
2001	Born to Do It	Best Album	Nominated
2016	Craig David	Best Male Act	Won
2016	"When the Bassline Drops" (with Big Narstie)	Best Song	Nominated

== MTV Europe Music Award ==
Year	Nominee / work	Award	Result
2000	Craig David	Best UK & Ireland Act	Nominated
2001	Craig David	Best Male	Nominated
2001	Craig David	Best New Act	Nominated
2001	Craig David	Best R&B	Won
2001	Craig David	Best UK & Ireland Act	Won
2003	Craig David	Best Male	Nominated
2003	Craig David	Best R&B	Nominated

== MTV Video Music Award ==
Year	Nominee / work	Award	Result
2001	"Fill Me In"	MTV2 Award	Nominated
2002	"Walking Away"	Best Male Video	Nominated

== Other awards and honors ==
- Honorary Degree, Doctor of Music, Southampton Solent University, 7 November 2008
