= Colin Lester =

Colin Lester OBE
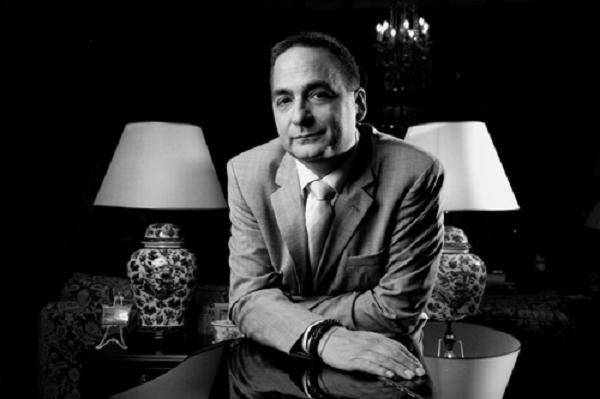
- Colin Lester - British music manager

Background information
- Born: Colin Lester; 26 May 1960 (age 66)
- Origin: London, England
- Genres: R&B, pop, rock
- Occupation: Artist manager
- Years active: 1979–present
- Website: http://colinlester.com/

Colin Lester (born 26 May 1960 in London) is a British artist manager of R&B, pop and rock music acts.

Colin Lester has managed the careers for numerous British and international artists. He was awarded 'The Peter Grant Award' for outstanding achievement from the United Kingdom's Music Manager Forum in 2002.

In 2007, Lester was awarded the prestigious 'Gold Badge Award' by BASCA (The British Academy of Songwriters and Composers Association) for his work with UK songwriters. The following year, in 2008, Lester was made a 'Visiting Fellow' of Southampton Solent University where he also lectures on topics of the 'Music Industry'.

Lester owned a significant stake in the recording company Wildstar Records for which he also acted as co-director and co-owned artist management Wildlife Entertainment.

== Professional life ==
=== Management ===
Lester began his career in the music business as a guitarist with London glam rock outfit, The Eyes. At the age of 19, Lester and The Eyes signed their first recording contract in 1979 with Don Arden's Jet Records. Following the demise of The Eyes two years later, Lester entered artist management. His first major signing was the UK indie band Daisy Chainsaw followed by signings of singer/songwriter Martyn Joseph and Manchester duo, JJ, both of whom he negotiated recording contracts for with CBS Records, now known as Sony Records.

In 1994, Lester joined the management company Wildlife Entertainment in partnership with Ian McAndrew (who had previously managed Tasmin Archer and Bomb the Bass) to manage London funksters, The Brand New Heavies. Under Wildlife's guidance, The Brand New Heavies produced their album, Brother Sister which achieved multi-platinum success around the world. Wildlife Entertainment also managed Carleen Anderson who followed her success with the Young Disciples with an acclaimed solo career.

In 1996, Wildlife Entertainment took charge of the career of Scottish four-piece Travis who signed to Andy MacDonald's Independiente Records after the release of their debut album. Travis' second album, The Man Who was released in 1999 and established Travis as one of the biggest selling UK acts between 1999 and 2002. In 1997, Lester, together with McAndrew, formed the UK record label Wildstar Records in partnership with Capital Radio and Telstar Records. Wildstar Records enjoyed immediate success with South London soul singer Conner Reeves, before scoring top 5 hits with Lutricia McNeal, Alda and Fierce.

In 1999, Lester discovered and signed 18-year-old Craig David. His Wildstar debut, "Fill Me In" made Craig David the youngest male solo artist ever to achieve a number one single, and his subsequent hits, "7 Days" and "Walking Away", boosted sales of David's debut album, Born to Do It to over 7 million copies including 1.8 million sales in North America. To date, Craig David, under Lester's management, has sold in excess of 13 million records. In 2003, Lester and McAndrew, in partnership with Geoff Barradale, signed Sheffield four-piece Arctic Monkeys. Their debut album, Whatever People Say I Am, That's What I'm Not was released in January 2006, and was the biggest selling debut album by a band in the UK of all time. It entered the UK charts at #1 where it remained for 5 weeks and has so far sold in excess of 2 million copies around the world.

In 2010, Lester merged his company CLM Entertainment with Twenty First Artists and was subsequently appointed Global Chief Executive Officer. Twenty-First Artists was originally launched in 2000 and has represented artists such as Elton John, Jamiroquai, James Blunt and Lily Allen among many others. The company was sold to The Sanctuary Music Group in 2005 and was subsequently acquired by Universal Music Group in 2007.

In 2023, Lester was granted an O-1 Classification Visa for the United States.

=== Awards ===
In addition to his role as CEO/Chairman of JEM, Colin has been awarded many awards throughout his career including an Honorary Doctorate from Southampton Solent University where he is a regular lecturer. He was awarded 'The Peter Grant Award' for outstanding achievement from the UK's Music Manager Forum in 2002, the Gold Badge Award' by BASCA (The British Academy of Songwriters and Composers Association) for his work with UK songwriters in 2007 and the 'Artist Loyalty Award' for his longstanding relationship with Craig David at the 2016 A&R awards. He is also on the board of trustees for the MOBO Charity (Music of Black Origin) and is also on the committee of the Holocaust charity 'The 45 Aid Society' where he annually raises funds for worthy community and aid projects on their behalf.

=== OBE ===
On 30 December 2020, Lester was announced on the Queen's New Year Honours List to receive an OBE in recognition of his services to the music industry and to charity.
