= Greatest Hits 1992–2010: E da qui =

Album by Nek

Greatest hits album by Nek
- Released: 16 November 2010
- Recorded: 1992–2010
- Genre: Pop rock, Latin pop
- Length: 2:17:49
- Label: Warner Music

Nek chronology
Un'altra direzione (2009)	Greatest Hits 1992–2010: E da qui (2010)	Filippo Neviani (2013)

Greatest Hits 1992–2010: E da qui is the second greatest hits album by Italian singer-songwriter Nek. It was released in 2010.

== Overview ==
The compilation is composed of two discs, including the singles released in Nek's 20-year-long career, along with three live songs and three new tracks, released as singles to promote the album: "E da qui", "Vulnerabile" and the ballad "È con te", dedicated to Nek's daughter Beatrice.

A version of the album named "Greatest Hits 1992–2010: Es así" was released for the Spanish market. It contains the Spanish language versions of the songs. The newly recorded songs are named "Es así", "Vulnerable" and "Para tí".

In 2011, the song "E da qui" was used as soundtrack for a television public information film against drugs by the Italian Ministry of Health and the Italian Department for Anti-Drug Policies titled: Don't do drugs, do your life (Italian: Non ti fare, fatti la tua vita).

The album was certified platinum by the Federation of the Italian Music Industry for sales exceeding 60,000 copies in Italy.

== Track listing ==
=== Italian version ===
CD 1

No.	Title	Length
1.	"E da qui"	4:03
2.	"Vulnerabile"	3:10
3.	"È con te"	3:15
4.	"Amami"	3:49
5.	"In te"	4:47
6.	"Cuori in tempesta"	4:43
7.	"Angeli nel ghetto"	4:02
8.	"Dimmi cos'è"	3:42
9.	"Tu sei, tu sai"	4:19
10.	"Laura non c'è"	3:45
11.	"Sei grande"	4:08
12.	"Se io non-avessi te"	3:45
13.	"Sto con te"	4:16
14.	"Se una regola c'è"	3:36
15.	"Con un ma e con un se"	3:32
16.	"Ci sei tu"	4:19
17.	"Sul treno"	3:55
18.	"La vita è"	4:19

CD 2

No.	Title	Length
1.	"Sei solo tu"	3:15
2.	"Parliamo al singolare"	3:30
3.	"Cielo e terra"	3:58
4.	"Almeno stavolta'"	3:26
5.	"L'anno zero"	3:27
6.	"Lascia che io sia..."	3:31
7.	"Contromano"	3:27
8.	"L'inquietudine"	3:27
9.	"Instabile"	3:33
10.	"Notte di febbraio"	4:10
11.	"Nella stanza 26"	3:43
12.	"La voglia che non-vorrei"	3:48
13.	"Se non-ami"	3:23
14.	"Semplici emozioni"	3:52
15.	"Walking Away" (Duet with Craig David)	3:26
16.	"Laura non-c'è" (Live 2001)	4:06
17.	"Sul treno" (Live 2001)	4:48
18.	"Sei solo tu" (Live 2005)	3:34

=== Spanish version ===
CD 1

No.	Title	Length
1.	"Es así"	4:03
2.	"Vulnerable"	3:10
3.	"Para ti"	3:15
4.	"Amami" (Italian)	3:49
5.	"En ti"	4:47
6.	"Corazones en tempestades"	4:43
7.	"Ángeles del ghetto"	4:02
8.	"Dime porqué"	3:42
9.	"Tú estás aquí"	4:19
10.	"Laura no está"	3:45
11.	"Tu nombre"	4:08
12.	"Si se que te tengo a ti"	3:45
13.	"Quédate"	4:16
14.	"No preguntes por qué"	3:36
15.	"Su tal vez, su quizá"	3:32
16.	"Llegas tú"	4:19
17.	"En el tren"	3:55
18.	"La vida es"	4:19

CD 2

No.	Title	Length
1.	"Tan solo tú"	3:15
2.	"Hablemos en pasado"	3:30
3.	"Cielo y tierra"	3:58
4.	"Al menos ahora"	3:26
5.	"El año zero"	3:27
6.	"Para tí sería"	3:31
7.	"A contramano"	3:27
8.	"La inquietud"	3:27
9.	"Vértigo"	3:33
10.	"Noche de febrero"	4:10
11.	"En el cuarto 26"	3:43
12.	"Deseo que ya no puede ser"	3:48
13.	"Si no amas"	3:23
14.	"Simples emociones"	3:52
16.	"Laura no está" (Live 2001)	4:06
17.	"Sul treno" (Live 2001)	4:48
18.	"Sei solo tu" (Live 2005)	3:34

== Charts ==
Album

Chart (2010)	Peak position
Italian Albums (FIMI)	7
Swiss Albums (Schweizer Hitparade)	29
