= Brit Awards 2001 =

British music awards ceremony

- Date: 26 February 2001
- Venue: Earls Court
- Hosted by: Ant & Dec
- Most awards: Robbie Williams (3)
- Most nominations: Craig David (6)

Television/radio coverage
- Network: ITV

Brit Awards 2001 was the 21st edition of the annual pop music Brit Awards awards ceremony in the United Kingdom. They are run by the British Phonographic Industry and took place on 26 February 2001 at Earls Court in London.

== Performances ==
Artist(s)	Song(s)
Coldplay	"Trouble"
Craig David	"Fill Me In"
Destiny's Child	"Independent Women Part I"
Eminem	"The Real Slim Shady"
Hear'Say	"Pure and Simple"
Robbie Williams	"Rock DJ"
Sonique	"It Feels So Good"
Westlife	"Uptown Girl"
U2	"One" "Beautiful Day" "Until the End of the World"

== Winners and nominees ==
British Album of the Year (presented by Samuel L. Jackson)	Soundtrack/Cast Recording
Coldplay – Parachutes; Radiohead – Kid A; Robbie Williams – Sing When You're Winning; Craig David – Born to Do It; David Gray – Lost Songs	American Beauty; Air – The Virgin Suicides; Billy Elliot; Björk – Selmasongs; Shaft; The Beach
British Single of the Year (presented by David Ginola and Joely Richardson)	British Video of the Year (presented by Graham Norton and Jane Horrocks)
Robbie Williams – "Rock DJ"; All Saints – "Pure Shores"; Coldplay – "Yellow"; Craig David – "7 Days"; David Gray – "Babylon"; Moloko – "The Time Is Now"; Sonique – "It Feels So Good"; Spiller – "Groovejet (If This Ain't Love)"; Sugababes – "Overload"; Toploader – "Dancing in the Moonlight"	Robbie Williams – "Rock DJ"; All Saints – "Pure Shores"; Coldplay – "Yellow"; Craig David – "7 Days"; Toploader – "Dancing in the Moonlight" Eliminated; Jamelia – "Money"; Moloko – "The Time Is Now"; Sonique – "It Feels So Good"; Texas – "In Demand"; Travis – "Coming Around"
British Male Solo Artist (presented by Geri Halliwell)	British Female Solo Artist (presented by Jamie Oliver and Jules Oliver)
Robbie Williams; Badly Drawn Boy; Fatboy Slim; David Gray; Craig David	Sonique; Dido; Jamelia; Sade; PJ Harvey
British Group (presented by Fay Ripley & Ralf Little)	British Breakthrough Act (presented by Pete Tong and Sara Cox)
Coldplay; Moloko; Radiohead; Toploader; All Saints	A1; Artful Dodger; Coldplay; Craig David; Toploader
British Dance Act (presented by Audley Harrison and Denise Lewis)	Best Pop Act (presented by Cat Deeley)
Fatboy Slim; Moloko; Craig David; Sonique; Artful Dodger	Westlife; Britney Spears; Ronan Keating; S Club 7; Steps
International Male Solo Artist (presented by Elton John)	International Female Solo Artist (presented by Donny Osmond and Helena Christensen)
Eminem; Ricky Martin; Wyclef Jean; Ronan Keating; Sisqo	Madonna; Pink; Kylie Minogue; Jill Scott; Britney Spears
International Group (presented by Huey Morgan and Kylie Minogue)	International Breakthrough Act (presented by Hear'Say)
U2; Santana; Westlife; Savage Garden; The Corrs	Kelis; Pink; Westlife; Jill Scott; Lene Marlin

=== Outstanding Contribution to Music ===
- U2

== List of British Newcomer shortlist ==
British Dance Newcomer

- Artful Dodger (Runner-up)
- Chicane
- Oxide & Neutrino
- Shaft
- Sonique

British Pop Newcomer

- A1 (Runner-up)
- Atomic Kitten
- Lolly
- Point Break
- Richard Blackwood

British Rock Newcomer

- Badly Drawn Boy
- Coldplay (Runner-up)
- Death in Vegas
- Muse
- Toploader (Runner-up)

British Urban Newcomer

- Architechs
- Craig David (Runner-up)
- DJ Luck & MC Neat
- M. J. Cole
- Sweet Female Attitude

== Multiple nominations and awards ==
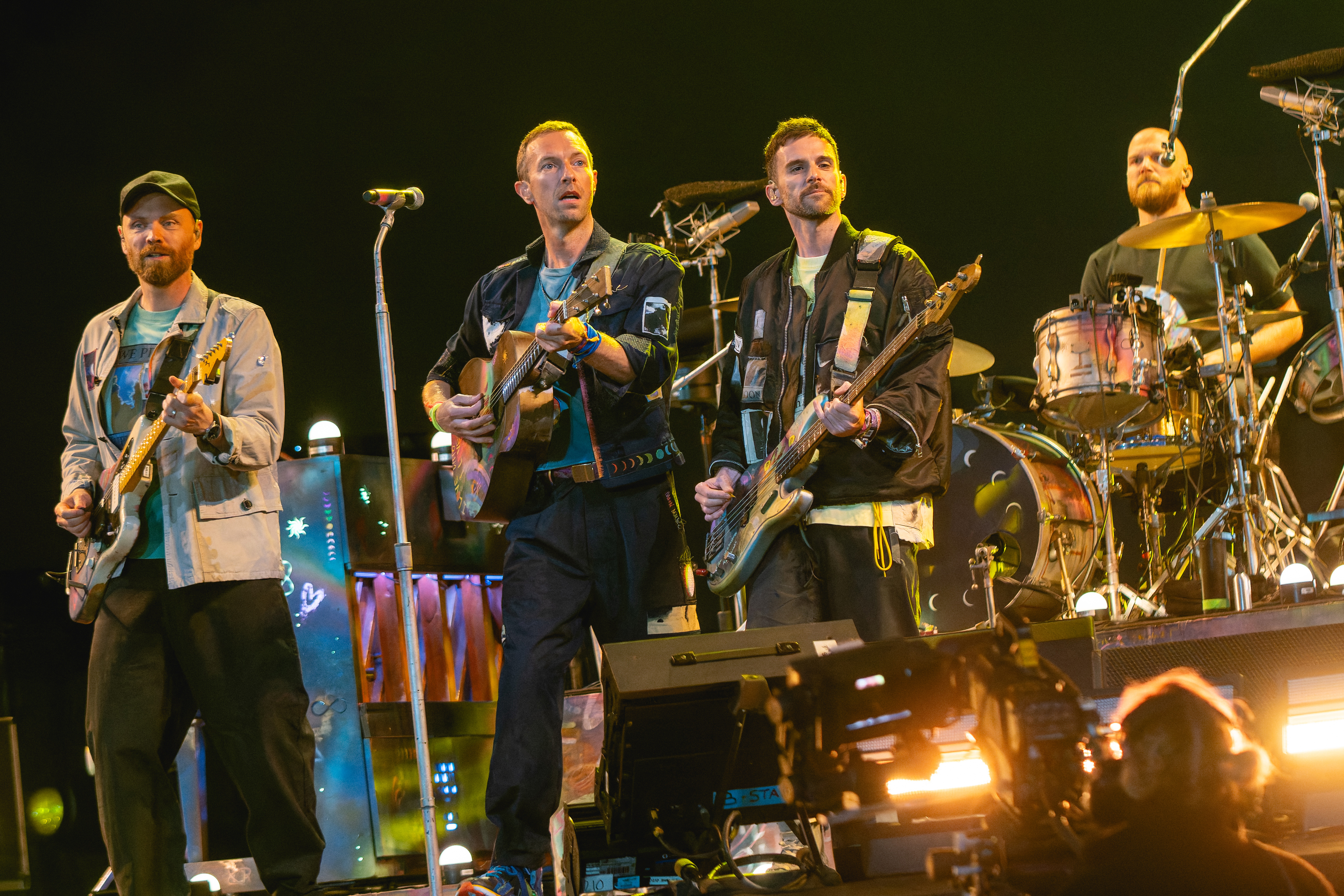
Two-time winner Coldplay

Artists that received multiple nominations
Nominations	Artist
6	Craig David
5	Coldplay
4 (3)	Moloko
4 (3)	Robbie Williams
4 (3)	Toploader
3 (4)	All Saints
3 (4)	David Gray
3 (4)	Sonique
3 (4)	Westlife
2 (8)	Artful Dodger
2 (8)	Britney Spears
2 (8)	Fatboy Slim
2 (8)	Jamelia
2 (8)	Jill Scott
2 (8)	Pink
2 (8)	Radiohead
2 (8)	Ronan Keating

Artists that received multiple awards
Awards	Artist
3	Robbie Williams
2	Coldplay

== Notable moments ==
=== Noel Gallagher and A1 ===
During the ceremony, boy band A1 picked up the 'Award for Best Newcomer'. At the end of the night, Oasis guitarist Noel Gallagher walked onto stage to present U2 with their 'Award for Outstanding Contribution to Music'. As Gallagher took the microphone at the start of his presenting speech, he said "This award ceremony over the years has been accused of not having a sense of humour, but when you see A1 winning best newcomer, you know that someone's taking the piss somewhere". A1 were apparently offended, and in April 2001 they performed a cover version of the Oasis song "Don't Look Back in Anger" in a mocking way, live using instruments, and not a backing track, as Gallagher had also called the band "manufactured".
