= Un'altra direzione =

Studio album by Nek
- Released: 30 January 2009
- Recorded: 2008; Logic Studios, Milan; Esagono Studio, Rubeira
- Genre: Pop rock, Soft rock
- Length: 46:16
- Label: Warner Music
- Producer: Nek, Alfredo Cerruti, Dado Parisini

Nek chronology
Nella stanza 26 (2006)	Un'altra direzione (2009)	Greatest Hits 1992–2010: E da qui (2010)

Un'altra direzione (English: Another Direction) is the tenth studio album by Italian singer-songwriter Nek released on 30 January 2009. Nuevas direcciones (English: New Directions) is the Spanish-language edition of the album, released on 14 April 2009.

The album topped the Italian Albums Chart, and was certified platinum by the FIMI for sales exceeding 70,000 copies in Italy.

== Composition ==
The album is musically pop rock with some other influences, like reggae on "Le mie mani", electronica on "Un'ora in più", as well country. It is considered as his most mature album up to that point in career, which lyrics, beside the love stories, show other themes like dependence on material goods ("Perdere il controllo"), difficulties encountered in everyday life ("Nel giorno che verrà") and marginalization ("Tira su il volume").

The lyrics of "Se non ami" were written after Nek read the 1 Corinthians 13, in Italian known as "Inno alla carità", credited by Paul the Apostle. The lyrics of "Per non morire mai" were inspired by a poem of Martha Medeiros, Muere lentamente. The song "Quante cose sei" is dedicated to Nek's wife.

== Release ==
The Italian-language album was released in standard edition with twelve tracks and bonus track "Walking Away" (a duet with Craig David), and special edition with only six tracks and reduced price due to crisis.

The first single "La voglia che non vorrei" was released on 9 January 2009, and its video was directed by Marco Salom. In the video the clashes between the players in the mud of rugby field were a metaphor of our life path fraught with difficulties and setbacks.

== Tour ==
Nek held a nationwide tour with over 16 concerts between March and May in 2009.

== Reception ==
Professional ratings
Review scores
Source	Rating
AllMusic	3.5/5 stars

The album has generally met with positive reviews. Alexey Eremenko from Allmusic gave the album 3.5/5 stars, noted that "the music is simply energetic enough -- the guitars may not be big enough for classic power pop", however Nek "knows just how to handle the music". In the best part it's like Bryan Adams, even Goo Goo Dolls, and it "packs copious amounts of minor-key melodies to create the romantic mood that Italian pop is primarily known for, with a twist of an innocently sleazy nighttime melodrama that is prime Ramazzotti. But Nek is clever enough to never overdo the dramatizing, and packs the tunes with enough simple but effective hooks to give the album the charm of a guilty pleasure done right".

== Track listing ==
=== Un'altra direzione ===
No.	Title	Lyrics	Music	Length
1.	"Tira su il volume"	Antonello De Sanctis	Daniele Ronda, Nek	3:19
2.	"Se non ami"	Antonello De Sanctis	Nek	3:22
3.	"La voglia che non vorrei"	Francesco De Benedittis, Francesco Gazze	Francesco De Benedittis, Massimiliano Corona	3:47
4.	"Semplici emozioni"	Cesare Chiodo	Cesare Chiodo	3:51
5.	"Quante cose sei"	Antonello De Sanctis	Gianluca Giardi	4:04
6.	"Un'altra direzione"	Andrea Amati	Andrea Amati, Nek	3:18
7.	"Un'ora in più"	Francesco De Benedittis, Francesco Gazze	Francesco De Benedittis, Massimiliano Corona	3:31
8.	"Le mie mani"	Antonello De Sanctis	Nek	3:10
9.	"Nel giorno che verrà"	Antonello De Sanctis	Sergio Vinci	3:23
10.	"Per non morire mai"	Antonello De Sanctis	Nek	4:10
11.	"Perdere il controllo"	Andrea Amati	Andrea Amati, Nek	3:28
12.	"La musica che c'è"	Antonello De Sanctis	Nek	3:31
13.	"Walking Away" (Duet with Craig David)	Craig David, Mark Hill	Craig David, Mark Hill	3:26

=== Nuevas direcciones ===
No.	Title	Length
1.	"Sube ya el volumen"	3:19
2.	"Si no amas"	3:22
3.	"Deseo que ya no puede ser"	3:47
4.	"Simples emociones"	3:51
5.	"Eres así"	4:04
6.	"Nuevas direcciones"	3:18
7.	"Una hora más"	3:31
8.	"El día llegará"	3:10
9.	"Mis manos"	3:23
10.	"Para no morir jamás"	4:10

== Personnel ==
Music

- Arranger: F. Neviani, Dado Parisini
- Producers: Dado Parisini, Alfredo Cerruti (also executive), Nek
- Production Assistant: Serena Baer
- Recording&Mixing: Jon Jacobs, Gabriele Gigli, Matteo Bolzoni (1, 2, 3, 5, 6, 7, 8, 12) at Logic Studio in Milan
- Recording&Mixing: Claudio Morselli, Jon Jacobs, Carlo Alberto Pinna, Giuseppe Salvadori (4, 9, 10, 11) at Esagono Studio in Rubeira
- Mastering: Antonio Baglio at Nautilus Studio in Milan

Cover art

- Photographer: Aaron Baghetti
- Artist: Sara Ferraris, Studioprodesign

Musicians

- Nek - vocals, acoustic guitar, keyboards, drums, dobro, percussions, electric guitar, backing vocals
- Paolo Costa - bass
- Emiliano Fantuzzi - electric guitar, keyboards
- Luciano Galloni - drums
- Max Costa - keyboards, programming
- Cesare Chiodo - programming
- Alfredo Golino - drums
- Dado Parisini - keyboards, piano, strings
- Massimo Varini - acoustic guitar, backing vocals, electric guitar

== Charts ==
2009 weekly chart performance for Un'altra direzione
Chart (2009)	Peak position
Italian Albums (FIMI)	1
Spanish Albums (PROMUSICAE)	25
Swiss Albums (Schweizer Hitparade)	3

2009 year-end chart performance for Un'altra direzione
Chart (2009)	Peak position
Italian Albums (FIMI)	33
Switzerland Albums	77
