= Lei, gli amici e tutto il resto =

Studio album by Nek
- Released: 1996; 1 March 1997 (re-released)
- Recorded: 1996–1997
- Genre: Pop rock, Latin pop
- Length: 57:21
- Label: Don't Worry
- Producer: Rolando D'Angeli

Nek chronology
Calore umano (1994)	Lei, gli amici e tutto il resto (1996)	In due (1998)

Lei, gli amici e tutto il resto (She, friends and everything else), is the fourth studio album by Italian singer-songwriter Nek. It was released in 1996, as his first studio album with Warner Music Group. It was re-released on 1 March 1997, after the success of the single "Laura non c'è", which had not been included in the album.

Since 1999 there have been reported sales of over 2 million copies all over the world.

== Track listing ==
#	Title	Length
1	Laura non c'è	3:46
2	Sei grande	4:00
3	Restiamo qui	4:54
4	Vivere senza te	3:52
5	Tu sei, tu sai	4:21
6	Sei	4:04
7	Dimmi cos'è	3:42
8	Vai sola	4:18
9	Solo	4:42
10	E non-mi dire che ho bevuto	4:24
11	Nati per vivere	3:55
12	Andare, partire, tornare	3:41
13	Di più	4:12
14	Fianco a fianco	3:09

== Musicians ==
- Nek – vocals, backing vocals, acoustic guitar
- Mario Flores – Hammond organ
- Massimo Barbari – piano
- Walter Sacripanti – drums
- Angelo Torelli – harmonica
- Rossano Eleuteri – bass
- Luca Tosoni – piano, keyboards
- Massimo Varini – guitar, backing vocals, keyboards

== Charts ==
=== Weekly charts ===
Weekly chart performance for Lei, gli amici e tutto il resto
Chart (1997–98)	Peak position
Austrian Albums (Ö3 Austria)	2
Finnish Albums (Suomen virallinen lista)	17
French Albums (SNEP)	55
German Albums (Offizielle Top 100)	14
Swedish Albums (Sverigetopplistan)	36
Swiss Albums (Schweizer Hitparade)	23
US Latin Pop Albums (Billboard)	12
US Top Latin Albums (Billboard)	27

=== Year-end charts ===
Year-end chart performance for Lei, gli amici e tutto il resto
Chart (1998)	Position
Austrian Albums (Ö3 Austria)	17
German Albums (Offizielle Top 100)	45

== Certifications and sales ==
Region	Certification	Certified units/sales
Austria (IFPI Austria)	Gold	25,000^{*}
Argentina (CAPIF)	Gold	30,000^{^}
France	—	100,000
Italy (FIMI)	6× Platinum	660,000
Mexico (AMPROFON)	Gold	100,000^{^}
Spain (Promusicae)	3× Platinum	300,000^{^}
Switzerland (IFPI Switzerland)	Platinum	50,000^{^}
Summaries
Europe (IFPI)	Platinum	1,000,000^{*}
^{*} Sales figures based on certification alone.^{^} Shipments figures based on certification alone.

== Reception ==
- allmusic
