= Nella stanza 26 =

Studio album by Nek
- Released: 17 November 2006
- Recorded: 2006
- Genre: Pop rock
- Length: 35:48
- Label: Warner Music
- Producers: Nek, Alfredo Cerruti, Dado Parisini, Massimo Varini

Nek chronology
Una parte di me (2005)	Nella stanza 26 (2006)	Un'altra direzione (2009)

Nella stanza 26 is the ninth studio album by Italian singer-songwriter Nek, released on 17 November 2006.

== Overview ==
The title song "Nella stanza 26" (in English: "In the room 26") was inspired and dedicated to a girl who wrote the anonymous letter in which is told she has to prostitute to maintain her family. The other songs often tell stories of love gone wrong. In 2007, for the title song Nek received the prestigious Lunezia "Poesia del Rock" award.

It includes the hit single "Instabile", which peaked at number three, and ranked in the Top 5 for 6 weeks.

== Track listing ==
#	Title	Length
1	Notte di febbraio	4:08
2	Cri	3:39
3	Instabile	3:32
4	Fumo	3:05
5	Attimi	4:08
6	Nella stanza 26	3:43
7	Sei	3:24
8	Ancora un giorno di te	3:02
9	Serenità	3:46
10	Contro le mie ombre	3:17

== Musicians ==
- Nek – vocals, soloist guitar, acoustic guitar, electric guitar, backing vocals
- Cesare Chiodo – bass
- Max Costa – keyboards
- Alex Bagnoli – programming
- Luciano Galloni – drums
- Dado Parisini – keyboards, Hammond organ
- Vittorio Giannelli – programming
- Gabriele Cicognani – bass
- Paolo Costa – bass
- Emiliano Fantuzzi – bass, programming, electric guitar, slide guitar, keyboards
- Pier Foschi – drums
- Alfredo Golino – drums
- Roberto Gualdi – drums
- Massimo Pacciani – drums
- Massimo Varini – programming, backing vocals, electric guitar

== Charts and certifications ==
=== Weekly charts ===
Chart (2006)	Peak position
Italian Albums (FIMI)	5
Mexican Albums (AMPROFON)	79
Spanish Albums (PROMUSICAE)	56
Swiss Albums (Schweizer Hitparade)	5

=== Year-end charts ===
Chart (2006)	Position
Swiss Albums (Schweizer Hitparade)	99

=== Certifications ===
Region	Certification	Certified units/sales
Italy (FIMI)	2× Platinum	160,000^{*}
^{*} Sales figures based on certification alone.
