= Sei solo tu =

Single by Nek feat. Laura Pausini

from the album Le cose da difendere
- B-side: "En el tren"
- Released: 10 May 2002
- Genre: Pop
- Length: 3:18
- Label: Don't Worry
- Songwriters: Nek, Cheope
- Producers: Nek, Dado Parisini, Alfredo Cerruti

Nek singles chronology
"La vita è" (2000)	"Sei solo tu" (2002)	"Parliamo al singolare" (2002)

Laura Pausini singles chronology
"Una storia che vale" (2002)	"Sei solo tu" (2002)	"Surrender" (2002)

Music video
- "Sei solo tu" on YouTube

"Sei solo tu" is a song written by Cheope and Nek and recorded by Italian singers Nek and Laura Pausini for Nek's seventh studio album, Le cose da difendere. The song was released on 10 May 2002 as the album's lead single.

The Spanish version of the album, Las cosas que defenderé, also includes a Spanish-language version of the song, titled "Tan sólo tú" and released as a single in Spain, South America, and in the United States.

Nek also included a solo version of the song in his compilation albums The Best of Nek: L'anno zero and Greatest Hits 1992–2010: E da qui.

== Composition ==
During an interview released to Italian newspaper Corriere della Sera, Nek described the song as "a clear love declaration between a boy and a girl, told with very simple words and music".

== Track listing ==
CD single – "Sei solo tu"

1. "Sei solo tu" (feat. Laura Pausini) – 3:18
2. "Sei solo tu" (Instrumental version) – 3:19
3. "En el tren" – 3:56

CD single – "Tan sólo tú"

1. "Tan sólo tú" (Album version)
2. "Tan sólo tú" (Radio edito)
3. "Tan sólo tú" (Extended Club Mix)

== Personnel ==
Music credits

- Cheope – composer
- Paolo Costa – bass
- Riccardo Galardini – acoustic guitar
- Alfredo Golino – drums
- Nek – vocals, composer
- Dado Parisini – keyboards, grooves, vocal arrangements
- Laura Pausini – vocals
- Massimo Varini – acoustic guitar, electric guitar

Production credits

- Dado Parisini – producer
- Alfredo Cerruti – producer
- Nek – producer
- Renato Cantele – engineer
- Carlo Enrico – assistant
- Gebriele Gigli – assistant
- Matteo Bolzoni – assistant
- Matteo Rovatti – assistant

== Charts ==
=== Weekly charts ===
Chart (2002)	Peak position
France (SNEP)	55
Italy (FIMI)	3
Italy Airplay (Music Control)	1
Switzerland (Schweizer Hitparade)	46
US Hot Latin Songs (Billboard)	36
US Latin Pop Airplay (Billboard)	17
US Latin Tropical (Billboard)	30

=== Year-end charts ===
Chart (2002)	Position
Italy (FIMI)	20

== Release history ==
Region	date	Format
Italy	26 April 2002	Airplay
Italy	10 May 2002	CD single
