= Nek =

Italian musician (born 1972)

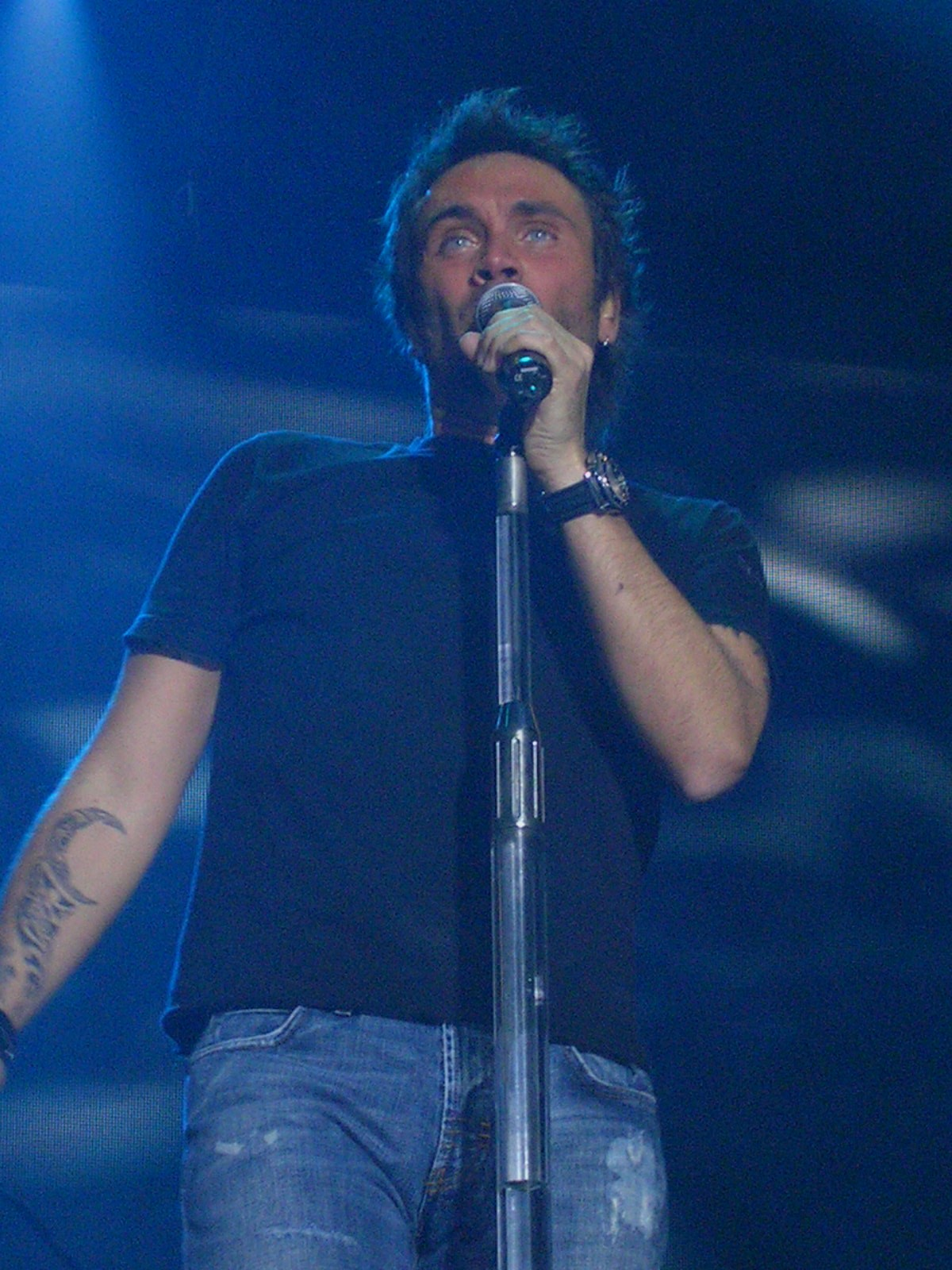
- Nek in concert at the Assago Forum, 2005

Background information
- Born: Filippo Neviani; 6 January 1972 (age 54); Sassuolo, Modena, Italy
- Genres: Pop; rock
- Occupations: Singer; songwriter; musician
- Instruments: Vocals; guitar; bass; drums
- Years active: 1991–present
- Labels: Fonit Cetra; Don't Worry; Warner Music Group
- Website: www.nekweb.com

Filippo Neviani (born 6 January 1972), known by his stage name Nek, is an Italian singer-songwriter and musician. Nek is popular in Italy and throughout the Spanish-speaking world, and has performed and released most of his albums in both Italian and Spanish.

Nek first gained international success in 1997, when he took part in the Sanremo Music Festival in the Big Artists section, and although he did not win, the song "Laura non c'è" (in Spanish: "Laura no está") went on to become his international breakthrough as it became a major hit in Europe and Latin America that year, as well the release of his fourth and million-selling album Lei, gli amici e tutto il resto, which was his first album to also be recorded in the Spanish language. After eighteen years he performed at the Sanremo's 2015 edition with the song "Fatti avanti amore" where he reached second place.

During his career he has released thirteen studio albums and forty-eight singles, which include hits "Sei solo tu", "Almeno stavolta", "Lascia che io sia", "Instabile", "La voglia che non-vorrei", and it has been reported that he has sold over 10 million records.

== Biography ==
=== 1972–1991: Early life and first music activity ===
Filippo Neviani was born on 6 January 1972 in Sassuolo, Province of Modena. He began playing drums, bass and guitar at nine years of age. He was especially influenced by country musicians like John Denver, and later Sting. In the late 1980s he began searching for a well-defined expressive identity and started playing in small clubs with his country music-oriented band "Winchester", and subsequently enjoyed budding notoriety in the Bologna province with soft-rock band "White Lady". In the 1991 began his solo career when he earned second place at the Castrocaro Music Festival, which at the time represented a major promotional opportunity for emerging artists.

=== 1992–1999: The beginning of the success, Lei, gli amici e tutto il resto, In due ===
His stage name Nek dates back to 1992 when his first album was released with the name Nek, released by the at the time famous record label Fonit Cetra. In 1993 he finished in third placebin the Newcomers section of the Sanremo Music Festival, with the song "In te", that dealt with the controversial issue of abortion. It was also the title of Nek's second album, which included a version of his song "Figli di chi", also entered in the Sanremo Festival 1993 and performed by Mietta.

In the summer of 1994 he released Calore umano, his third album, and came second at the Festival Italiano, hosted by Mike Bongiorno, with the song "Angeli nel ghetto". Also in 1994 he received his first major acknowledgement, together with Giorgia the European Award as best young Italian pop artist.

After having signed a recording contract with WEA, which has remained his label to date (now Warner Music Group), in 1996 was released his fourth studio album Lei, gli amici e tutto il resto, with average success. In 1997 he took part in the Sanremo Music Festival in the Big Artists section, with the song "Laura non c'è" which although it failed to win the Festival, it became that year's edition's greatest hit. The huge success of "Laura non c'è" boosted sales of the album Lei, gli amici e tutto il resto (re-released), which went 6 times platinum, selling over 600,000 copies in Italy alone. That same year Nek also took part in the Festivalbar with the song "Sei grande", and debuted on the European market; The rush-released Spanish version of the album was released in May, while complete in September; according to WEA Italy Nek sold 300,000 albums in Spain and 100,000 in France, with additional 250,000 copies of "Laura non c'è" in France. In August 1998, Nek officially received the IFPI award for the album having sold more than a million copies in Europe.

The single and album have also successfully charted in Switzerland, Belgium, Austria, Portugal, Sweden, Finland and Germany. Nek's confirmation as a major international artist arrived when the album was published throughout Latin America, including Brazil, Argentina, where the single "Laura no está" became a hit song and both it and the album were certified Gold, Peru, Colombia, and the album 100,000 copies sold in Mexico in its Spanish version.

In Spain he was nominated for the Premio Amigo in the "Best New Artist/Revelation" category, while the album at the Billboard Latin Music Awards in 1999 for the "Rock Album of the Year" award. Nek commented how his previous inexperience and the search for musical identity, and when switched labels, the change of musical style from traditional Italian pop to more Anglo pop rock sound, resulted in his sudden success.

Nek's fifth album In due was released in June 1998, simultaneously in Europe, Latin America and Japan. The single "Se io non-avessi te" immediately topped the sales charts and ranked high in all the major radio play charts for over four months, for which received the Festivalbar "Radio" award. The album went three times Platinum in Italy, Platinum in Spain, and Gold throughout Europe. In the first half of 1999 he toured Italy, Europe and Latin America, enjoying great success wherever he performed.

=== 2000–2007: La vita è, Le cose da difendere, Una parte di me, Nella stanza 26 ===
His sixth album La vita è was released worldwide on 2 June 2000, and peaked at number eight on the charts in Italy, and seventh in Switzerland, selling over 360,000 copies in both languages. Two years later, on 24 May 2002, his seventh album Le cose da difendere was released, once again worldwide, and it peaked at number four on the charts in Italy, and stayed in the Top 5 for 4 weeks, being certified Platinum in Italy, and Gold in Switzerland.

On 10 October 2003, his first greatest hits compilation was released, The Best of Nek: L'anno zero, in both the Italian and Spanish versions. It crowned the successful 10 years by offering hits taken from the seven previous albums, plus two unreleased tracks, "Almeno stavolta" and "L'anno zero". The album sold over 300,000 copies in Italy alone, and peaked at the third place on the charts, where it stayed for 40 weeks, of which 13 in the Top 10. The song "Almeno stavolta" was a highly popular song, it peaked at number five on the charts and remained in the Top 10 for 12 weeks. In 2004 was held European and Latin American tour.

On 13 May 2005, was released his eighth studio album, Una parte di me. The album peaked at number three in Italy and Switzerland, stayed on the Italian charts for more than 50 weeks, and sold over 200,000 copies. On 2 July, Nek performed at the Live 8 benefit concert, and in November started the arena tour to promote the new album debuted at the Milan Forum with a sold-out show, and went on to match the same achievement in every major Italian city.

The album also included the hit single "Lascia che io sia...", with which Nek won that year's edition of Festivalbar. The single peaked at number two on the charts, ranked in the Top 8 for 15 weeks, and being certified Platinum was one of Italy's Top Ten selling singles of the year. In the summer 2007 Nek re-recorded the song "Para ti sería..." (Spanish version of 2005's hit) with the Spanish band "El Sueño de Morfeo". The song was included in the re-edition of En el cuarto 26 and the single reached number one in the Spanish download charts (more than 250,000 downloads), holding the top position for over 13 weeks. The two following singles, "Contromano" and "L'inquietudine", also climbed the Italian radio charts.

On 23 November 2006, Nek released his ninth album Nella stanza 26 (in Spanish: En el cuarto 26) peaked at number five in Italy and Switzerland, and again sold over 200,000 copies. It included the hit single "Instabile", which peaked at number three, and ranked in the Top 5 for 6 weeks. In 2007, for the song "Nella stanza 26" Nek received the prestigious Lunezia "Poesia del Rock" award, and performed at the Wind Music Awards, in Via della Conciliazione, Rome.

=== 2008–2012: Un'altra direzione and 20 years of career ===
In 2008 Nek recorded a duet of "Walking Away" with Craig David, which was included in the Greatest Hits of the British artist.

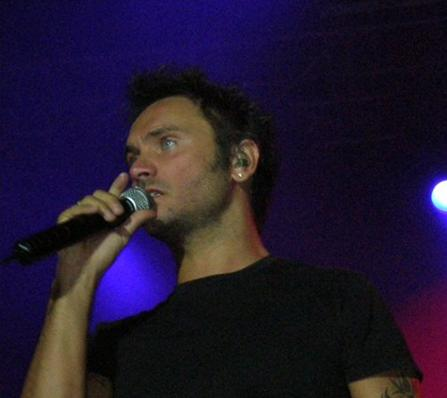
Nek performing in Valladolid, 2009.

On 30 January 2009 Nek released Un'altra direzione, his tenth album which contains 12 new originals plus "Walking Away", and preceded by the single "La voglia che non-vorrei", is his first album to top the album charts. It was certified Platinum, with over 70,000 copies sold. The Spanish-language version of the single called "El deseo que ya no puede ser" was released two months later followed by the album Nuevas direcciones. Nek also participated as part of the supergroup Artisti Uniti on the charity single "Domani 21/04.09" in support for the victims of the 2009 L'Aquila earthquake.

Greatest Hits 1992–2010: E da qui was released on 16 November 2010 and has a collection of songs by Nek in his 20-year career and three previously unpublished songs: "E da qui", "Vulnerabile" and "È con te", plus 3 live songs recorded in the Summer Tour of 2010. It charted for over 64 weeks, and was certified Platinum by FIMI. On 28 March, Nek performed two songs "Se non-ami" e "Per non-morire mai" at the 25th anniversary of the World Youth Day at St. Peter's Square in Vatican City.

In October 2011, Nek sang duet with L'Aura in a re-release of her song named "Eclissi del cuore", the Italian version of the 80's power ballad "Total Eclipse of the Heart" by Bonnie Tyler. It was released as a single in October 2011, reaching number five on the Italian Singles Chart, and was certified Platinum by FIMI. In July, Nek performed at the humanitarian concert at piazza of Basilica of San Francesco, in Assisi. On 25 July 2012, performed at the big humanitarian concert at Stadio Renato Dall'Ara, Bologna.

=== 2013–2020: Filippo Neviani, Prima di parlare, Unici ===
On 16 April 2013, his eleventh studio album was released under the title Filippo Neviani and went on to peak at number two in the music charts. All the tracks on the album were played by Nek. The album followed on from the hit single "Congiunzione Astrale", on 22 March 2013. The following single "La metà di niente" was also re-recorded in Spanish as "La Mitad de Nada" in a duet with Sergio Dalma. In 2014, Nek received the Lunezia award in the "Pop Rock" category for the album due to musical-literary value.

On 11 May, Nek performed at the RadioItalia Live concert in Piazza Duomo, Milan. In June performed at the charity concert "Nel nome del cuore" at Assisi, in July performed at Foro Italico in Rome, and at Reventon Music Festival, at the sold-out Staples Center in Los Angeles. On 23 September, he performed at the La Mercè Festival in Barcelona. On 3 October, Nek's European Tour was cancelled because of health issues with vocal cords, for which in order to avoid surgery was not allowed to sing for two months.

In 2014, Nek received the "Tributo ad Augusto," award given every year to the artist who is distinguished by his artistic and social activity. On 28 March, as honorary president, Nek presented the 17th Magna Grecia Awards, exhibition dedicated to the beauty, culture and art inspired by Magna Grecia which takes place every year in Apulia. On 1 September, performed live at the humanitary football match "Partita Interreligiosa per la Pace", at Stadio Olimpico, Rome.

In February 2015, Nek participated at the 65th Sanremo Music Festival, where with the song "Fatti avanti amore" he finished in second place. Although he didn't win the main competition, he won with the song "Se telefonando" by Mina for the "Best Cover", and with his song "Fatti avanti amore" another three awards, for the "Best Arrangement" awarded by the festival orchestra, the newsroom Radio and TV "Lucio Dalla," as well radio award "Sempre più Sanremo" for the most popular festival song on radio. On 4 March Nek released his twelfth studio album Prima di parlare, followed by a national tour in autumn. The album, as well the two singles, were certified Platinum by FIMI.

In 2016, Nek was a coach in the 15th edition of the talent show Amici di Maria De Filippi. In May was released single "Uno di questi giorni" which was certified Gold by FIMI. In July performed at Reventon, festival dedicated to the Latin American music, at Microsoft Theatre in Los Angeles, while in October at the "Football for Peace" in Rome organized by Pope Francis.

On 14 October was released his thirteenth studio album Unici. It will be followed by nationwide tour in the spring and summer of 2017, as well on 21 May 2017 with his first concert at Verona Arena.

=== 2021–present: 30 years of career ===
Nek competed in the Sanremo Music Festival 2024 alongside Francesco Renga with "Pazzo di te".

== Personal life ==
On 2 September 2006 Nek married Patrizia Vacondio. They have a daughter, Beatrice Maria, born 12 September 2010. He is a practising Catholic.

== Discography ==
- Nek (1992)
- In te (1993)
- Calore umano (1994)
- Lei, gli amici e tutto il resto (1996)
- In due (1998)
- La vita è (2000)
- Le cose da difendere (2002)
- Una parte di me (2005)
- Nella stanza 26 (2006)
- Un'altra direzione (2009)
- Filippo Neviani (2013)
- Prima di parlare (2015)
- Unici (2016)
- Il mio gioco preferito - prima Parte (2019)
- Il mio gioco preferito - seconda parte (2020)

Awards and achievements
Preceded by (Sweden) Helena Paparizou	OGAE Second Chance Contest winner 2015	Succeeded by (Poland) Margaret
