= La vita è =

Studio album by Nek
- Released: 2 June 2000
- Recorded: 1999–2000
- Genre: Pop rock, Latin pop
- Length: 56:34
- Label: Warner Music, Don't Worry
- Producer: Massimo Varini

Nek chronology
In due (1998)	La vita è (2000)	Le cose da difendere (2002)

La vita è is the sixth studio album by Italian singer-songwriter Nek. It was released in 2000.

== Track listing ==
#	Title	Length
1	Ci sei tu	4:21
2	Miami	3:42
3	La vita è	4:19
4	Il nostro giorno in più	4:39
5	Pieno d'energia	3:49
6	Sul treno	3:54
7	Sana gelosia	3:52
8	Mi piace vivere	3:50
9	Meglio esserci	4:12
10	Credo	4:19
11	Missile speciale	4:09
12	Tu mi dai	3:54
13	Con la terra sotto di me	3:53
14	Ci sei tu (Chitarra e voce)	3:41

== Charts and certifications ==
=== Weekly charts ===
Chart (2000)	Peak position
Austrian Albums (Ö3 Austria)	30
German Albums (Offizielle Top 100)	31
Italian Albums (FIMI)	8
Spanish Album (Promusicae)	33
Swiss Albums (Schweizer Hitparade)	6
US Top Latin Albums (Billboard)	44

=== Year-end charts ===
Chart (2000)	Position
Swiss Albums (Schweizer Hitparade)	59

=== Certifications ===
Region	Certification	Certified units/sales
Italy (FIMI)	2× Platinum	200,000^{*}
^{*} Sales figures based on certification alone.
