= Filippo Neviani (album) =

Studio album by Nek
- Released: 16 April 2013
- Recorded: Hukapan Studio, Milan
- Genre: Rock
- Length: 36:40
- Label: Warner Music Italy
- Producer: Nek, Dado Parisini, Alfredo Cerruti

Nek chronology
| Greatest Hits 1992–2010: E da qui (2010) | Filippo Neviani (2013) | Prima di parlare (2015) |

Singles from Filippo Neviani
- 1. "Congiunzione astrale" Released: March 22, 2013; 2. "La metà di niente" Released: June 21, 2013; 3. "Hey Dio" Released: April 11, 2014

Filippo Neviani is the eleventh studio album by Italian singer-songwriter Nek released on 16 April 2013. In the same year it was recorded and released in Spanish language. The album is notable for being mainly written, composed and performed by Nek alone. In 2014, Nek received the Lunezia award in the "Pop Rock" category for the album due to musical-literary value.

== Overview ==
The album's title is Nek's personal name and surname. The album was "written more natural, more personal, more heartfelt". It is his first album artwork that includes his personal name with stage name, because it's his way of saying that the man Filip and the artist Nek are not two different people, that more than ever they correspond, a turning point in his career.

The album was dedicated to his recently deceased father, and the birth of his daughter, Beatrice Maria. Nek said that his father always wanted to see Filippo's surname "Neviani" on a cover of one of his albums.

== Composition ==
All of the instruments, such as the guitar, bass guitar, and drums, were played by Nek. This was due to the fact that when musicians play certain instruments for his songs, he felt that "you lose a part of the magic". This was also why he kept musical sequences, synths, violins, and other orchestral instruments out of the album, with support only from his engineer.

Nek considered the music in the album to be more rock than his previous albums. He notes "It's a genre that I have always heard, I'm an incurable nostalgic... I've never done this kind of music explicitly, as a citation, but I wanted to get closer to a color more 'rock' because I felt the need... I listened to many rock bands like Muse, Editors, Kings Of Leon, Red Hot Chili Peppers, [which was] useful during the development of the songs", to show his "true spirit".

The album opens with song "Hey Dio" which is a reflection of current dark period addressed to all, even those who are not faithful Catholics – "laity and believers like me have the same need to find answers in this cultural and political reality made dirty by latent anger, decline of values and "mors tua vita mea" (your death, my life) as a philosophy of life". He considered the song for the opening because it gives the musical direction to the whole album. The song "Dentro l'anima" is dedicated to his daughter Beatrice Maria and in the intro includes her heartbeat, while "Il mondo tra le mani" is dedicated to Martina, daughter of his wife.

== Release ==
"Congiunzione astrale", the music video was recorded in San Francisco by Marco Salom, and recounts a story of Kim and Jason, two young people which will meet each other in "Astral conjunction". The Spanish version of the single "La metà di niente" ("La mitad de nada") was recorded in duet with Sergio Dalma.

== Reception ==
Professional ratings
Review scores
| Source | Rating |
|---|---|
| Rockol | 3.5/5 stars |
| Spazio Rock | 7/10 stars |

Mattia Marzi from Rockol gave the album 3.5/5 stars, noted that "Nek confirms himself as complete songwriter and able to play the triple role of author, performer and musician: all tracks on the disc have been played by him directly". It is "simple and direct, without too many tricks or electronic tricks, made with clean sound, poor", and what characterizes the album "it could be defined as a natural rock and inspired by the typical sounds of the great international power-trio band, making the album a happy island in the confusing scene and too pop-winking of the Italian discography. Not a disposable product, this, but a work sincere and unpretentious".

== Track listing ==
| No. | Title | Lyrics | Music | Length |
|---|---|---|---|---|
| 1. | "Hey Dio" | Nek, Marco Baroni | Nek | 3:49 |
| 2. | "Congiunzione astrale" | Federica Camba, Daniele Coro | Federica Camba, Daniele Coro | 4:07 |
| 3. | "Dentro l'anima" | Nek, Marco Baroni | Nek, Marco Baroni | 4:06 |
| 4. | "La metà di niente" | Nek, Federica Camba, Daniele Coro | Nek, Federica Camba, Daniele Coro | 3:35 |
| 5. | "Soltanto te" | Federica Camba, Daniele Coro | Nek | 3:48 |
| 6. | "Io no mai" | Nek, Marco Baroni | Nek | 3:24 |
| 7. | "Uno come me" | Nek, Federica Camba, Daniele Coro | Nek | 3:21 |
| 8. | "Verrà il tempo" | Nek, Marco Baroni | Nek | 3:36 |
| 9. | "Dammi di più" | Andrea Amati | Nek, Andrea Amati | 3:17 |
| 10. | "Il mondo tra le mani" | Nek, Marco Baroni | Nek | 3:38 |

== Personnel ==
Music

- Performer: Filippo Neviani
- Arranger: F. Neviani, Dado Parisini
- Producers: F. Neviani, D. Parisini, Alfredo Cerruti (executive)
- Production Assistant: Serena Baer
- Studio Assistant: Daniele Lanzara
- Mixer: David Bottrill (1, 5, 7, 9) at Mainstation Studio in Toronto
- Mixer: Max "MC" Costa (2, 3, 4, 6, 8, 10) at Hukapan Studio in Milan
- Recording: Max "MC" Costa at Hukapan Studio in Milan
- Mastering: Antonio Baglio at Nautilus Studio in Milan

Cover art

- Photographer: Johnny Buzzerio
- Assistant: Sonia Yruel
- Artist: Sbatch
- Hair & Make Up: Armando Sarabia
- Stylist: Tessa Watson

== Charts ==
| Chart (2016) | Peak position |
|---|---|
| Italian Albums (FIMI) | 2 |
| Belgian Albums (Ultratop Wallonia) | 145 |
| Spanish Albums (PROMUSICAE) | 30 |
| Swiss Albums (Schweizer Hitparade) | 16 |
