= Born to Do It =

Studio album by Craig David
- Released: 14 August 2000
- Recorded: 1999–2000
- Genres: 2-step garage; R&B
- Length: 49:06
- Labels: Wildstar; Atlantic
- Producers: Craig David; Mark Hill

Craig David chronology
Born to Do It (2000)	Slicker Than Your Average (2002)

Singles from Born to Do It
- 1. "Fill Me In" Released: 3 April 2000; 2. "7 Days" Released: 24 July 2000; 3. "Walking Away" Released: 28 November 2000; 4. "Rendezvous" Released: 19 March 2001

Born to Do It is the debut studio album by English singer Craig David, released in the United Kingdom on 14 August 2000 by Wildstar Records and in the United States later in 2001 by Atlantic Records. Following exposure from his work with British group Damage, David began performing vocals for garage duo Artful Dodger. During this time, Wildstar Records became aware of David, offering him a development deal before offering an album contract. The recording for the album began in 1999 before David had acquired a record contract. The recording lasted until 2000 and was composed by David himself and Mark Hill.

The title comes from a quote describing the character Willy Wonka in the 1971 film Willy Wonka & the Chocolate Factory. Born to Do It is a 2-step garage and R&B album, backed by electro beats, garage and hip-hop. The album's songs contain acoustic guitars and insistent thumps of beats and bass, with lyrics that revolve around themes of romance, the complexities of relationships, and clubbing. Upon release, the album was met with positive reviews from music critics and was listed as one of the "Greatest Albums Ever" by MTV.

Commercially, the album was a success, eventually selling over 7.5 million copies worldwide, making it one of the biggest albums by a UK R&B artist. The album debuted at number one on the UK Albums Chart, becoming the fastest-selling debut album ever by a British male solo act, and eventually being certified 6× Platinum in the region. The album spawned four singles, including the UK number ones "Fill Me In" and "7 Days", and the successful "Walking Away" and "Rendezvous".

== Background ==
David's earliest exposure came when he featured on "I'm Ready", the B-side to British boy band Damage's 1997 cover of "Wonderful Tonight"; he then began performing vocals for a few tracks with the English garage duo Artful Dodger. Wildstar Records first became aware of David when the artist's then manager Paul Widger met the label's co-owner Colin Lester and played some of his music. Lester later told HitQuarters that he was particularly impressed by the first song he heard, "Walking Away". The Wildstar boss was further won over when, on later visiting the artist's home in Southampton, he found that David's tiny bedroom was stacked from floor to ceiling with 12" vinyl records, commenting: "That convinced me he was the real deal and not just some kid acting out the part." At that point, Lester offered him a development deal with his label. When Lester later heard the song "7 Days", he said he immediately heard a number-one record and promoted the contract to an album deal the same day.

== Recording ==
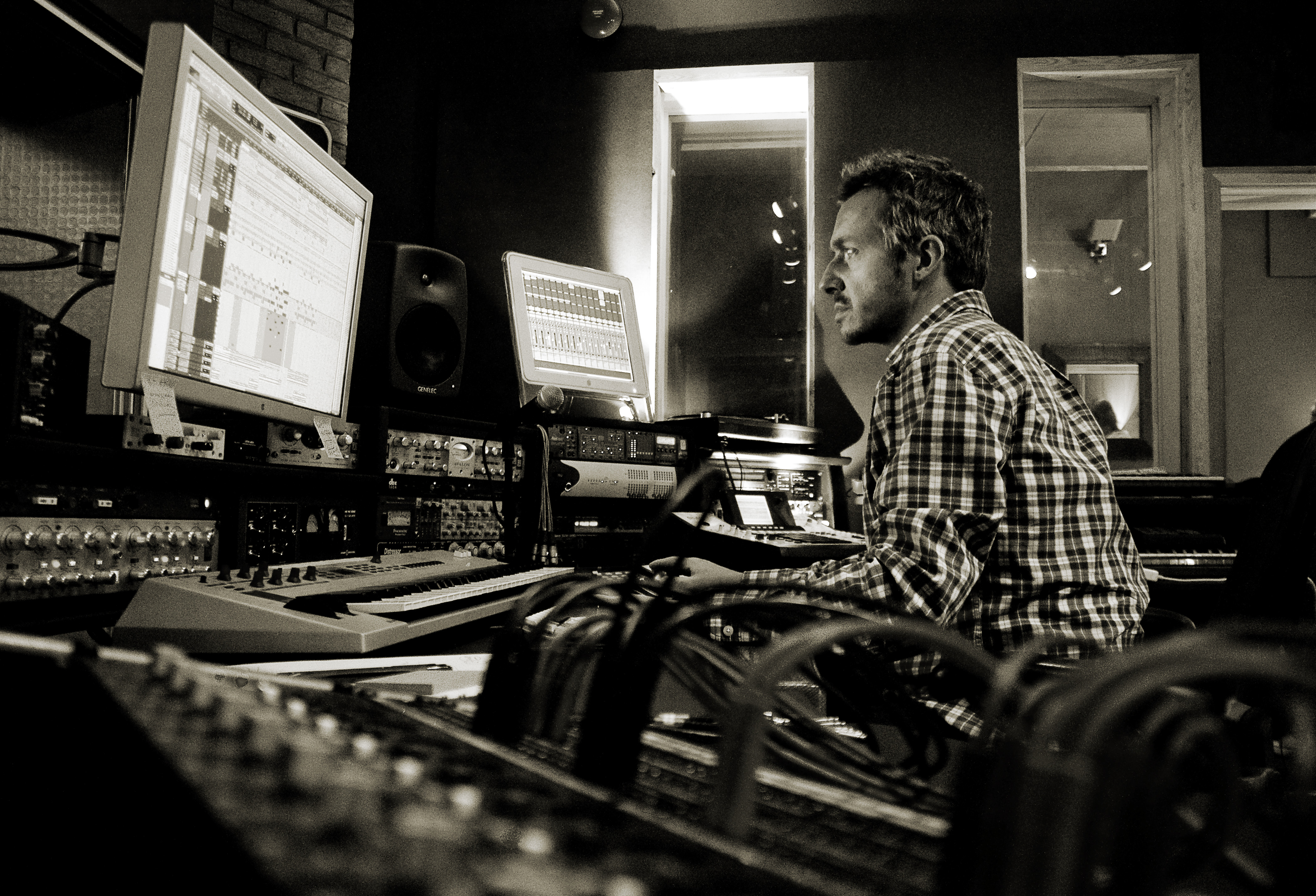
Fraser T. Smith served as the album's programmer.

After David and Mark Hill met, Hill enlisted David to feature on Artful Dodger's debut album. Hill found it hard to pay David for his appearances so instead offered him studio time and help with production at a small recording studio in Southampton. The album's recording began in 1999 and lasted through until 2000, Hill took responsibility for the album's production along with David, whilst David wrote the majority of the album's lyrics with co-writing from Hill. Hill stated that because there was no label during this time the pair had more creative freedom when creating the album;

When we started writing Born to Do It, there were no labels involved or managers or anything. We'd written the majority of the album before any of us was signed, so it was very much an organic process and it was just the two of us working on it without anyone. I remember when we were taking demos around the industry trying to get a deal, we had '7 Days,' 'Walking Away,' 'Time to Party' and others and those ended up being the final versions of the album.

The album was solely produced by David and Hill, whilst the latter also provided backing vocals, engineering and mixing. Ceri Evans also served as one of the album's producers, alongside Wayne Lawes who also provided drum programming, programming, remixing and vocal production, Fraser T. Smith also provided programming. A variety of other people were called up during the album's production, Dick Beetham helped with the mastering of the album whilst Andy Ward served as of the album's mixing engineers, with Goetz who provided engineering and mixing, Steve Fitzmaurice also provided mixing. Around the time that "Re-Rewind (The Crowd Say Bo Selecta)" began to gain commercial success, the majority of the album was recorded and produced. The last song to be recorded was the album's lead single "Fill Me In". Hill stated he wanted to create a song that contained a garage element in order to bridge the gap between Craig's project and his previous work with The Artful Dodger. Following the album's recording, David acquired a recording contract.

== Music and lyrics ==
Born to Do It merges smooth-soul over cascades of glistening keyboards, circling guitars, and sophisticated rhythms. The album merges current R&B vocal stylings and UK garage beats, creating a "pristine and immaculate" album. Ernest Hardy of Rolling Stone described the album as composed of electro-rouged beats of two-step garage, which Hardy compared to that of Teddy Riley and Timbaland; however, Hardy stated the album was also different from Rileys and Timbalands due to the album's ability to strike balance between traditional pop and R&B, using modern production flash as the bridge. The album's music contains acoustic guitars and prominently placed strings, layered just so over the insistent thump of beats and bass, even in the ballads.

The album's lyrical content focuses on themes of romance, the complexities of relationships, and clubbing. The album was noted for a range of lyrical themes from "the kind of sappy fare that lovesick teenagers play for one another late at night over the phone" to more self-consciously risque songs such as "Booty Man." David's vocals were described as "creamy" by Ernest Hardy of Rolling Stone who continued to describe his vocals as giving "texture", stating that David sounded like a boy becoming a "smooth" man. David's vocals were seen as being able to "flutter" over the album's "stuttering beats" and "race ahead of those same beats while still keeping time."

The album opens with "Fill Me In", a garage and R&B song built over plinky keyboards and staccato strings, that lyrically speaks on a modern-day tale of forbidden love. Tracks six and eight "Last Night" and "Time to Party" both take influence from hip-hop and contain spoken rap-like breakdowns, while relaying on a dance production. "Time to Party" also includes a brief sample of Busta Rhymes's "Put Your Hands Where My Eyes Can See". "Booty Man" features a folky acoustic guitar-driven production that features "overtly cocky lyrics." "Rewind" is a collaboration with two-step band Artful Dodger, the song is a bass-heavy track that features no R&B influences, unlike the rest of the album.

== Release and promotion ==
Born to Do It was released first in the United Kingdom on 14 August 2000 by the independent record label Wildstar Records and was later released in the United States in 2001 by Atlantic Records. In 2007, Wildstar Records and Atlantic Records released the album for digital download. The album was also released in Singapore in a limited edition bonus CD single format, the release featured four remixes, including a radio edit, an Ignorants remix, DJ Chunky remix and a Better Day remix. The title Born to Do It comes from a quote describing the character Willy Wonka in the 1971 film Willy Wonka & the Chocolate Factory.

The album was promoted with the release of four singles; the first, "Fill Me In", was released on 3 April 2000 and became a commercial success, debuting at number one on the UK Singles Chart, making David the youngest British male to have a number one single. On 28 December 2009, when BBC Radio 1 presenter Nihal revealed "The Official Top 100 Songs of the Decade", "Fill Me In" was at number 93. The song also saw success internationally, peaking at number 15 in the United States.

The album's second single, "7 Days", was released on 24 July 2000, the song debuted at number one on the UK Singles Chart after selling more than 100,000 copies in its first week, giving David his second consecutive UK number-one single and spending 15 weeks inside the UK top 75. It became David's only top 10 single on the US Billboard Hot 100, where it reached number 10. The song also reached number four in Australia and number six in New Zealand.

The album's third single, "Walking Away", was released on 31 October 2000, the song fared well on charts and became a huge success in New Zealand where it reached number one and became the number one song of 2001 in the region, combining both sales and airplay.

== Commercial performance ==
Born to Do It debuted at number one on the UK Albums Chart, selling 225,320 copies in its first week. In doing so, it became the fastest-selling debut album ever by a British male solo act, a record the album still holds. Born to Do It has since been listed as the 45th-fastest-selling album ever and went on to be certified 6× Platinum by the British Phonographic Industry (BPI) for shipments of 1.8 million copies. It went on to become the 35th-best-selling album of the decade in the United Kingdom. The album has sold over 1.94 million copies in the UK as of April 2020.

Born to Do It was a huge success worldwide. In Australia, it debuted at number eight on the week of 24 September 2000, going on to peak at number two on the Australian Albums Chart, where it stayed for five weeks. Born to Do It spent 52 weeks (one year) on the chart and was certified 4× Platinum by the Australian Recording Industry Association for shipments of 280,000 copies. The album saw similar success in New Zealand where it also peaked at number two on the charts and spent a total of 51 weeks before eventually being certified Platinum.

Prior to the album's US release, it had sold 3.5 million copies worldwide. Born to Do It peaked at number 11 on the US Billboard 200 and spent 62 weeks on the chart, and was eventually certified Platinum by the Recording Industry Association of America (RIAA) for shipments of one million copies. The album was listed as the 156th-best-selling album on the year in the United States. As well as appearing on the Billboard 200, the album also peaked at number 12 on the US Top R&B/Hip-Hop Albums chart. The album has sold eight million copies worldwide.

== Critical reception ==
Professional ratings
Review scores
Source	Rating
AllMusic	4/5 stars
Blender	3/5 stars
Christgau's Consumer Guide	(3-star Honorable Mention)
The Daily Telegraph	5/5 stars
Entertainment Weekly	B+
The Independent	3/5 stars
NME	8/10
Pitchfork	7.2/10
Rolling Stone	3/5 stars
Uncut	3/5 stars

Born to Do It received acclaim from music critics. Davey Boy of Sputnikmusic described the album as an "excellent debut" continuing to state that David was a "mature 19-year-old singer-songwriter whose soulfully smooth voice will result in fans thinking he is singing to them and only them." Rating the album five stars out of five, The Daily Telegraph called Born to Do It "garage and R&B at its best. It goes from funky to sultry to downright beautiful."

AllMusic editor Stephen Mercier found that the "lyrics do sometimes sound underdeveloped due to David's age, and the music can occasionally lack distinctiveness, yet those two factors do not hinder the celebratory power of Born to Do It. The album features an effortless presentation of limber and carefully articulated vocal talents by the singer that seamlessly glide through the polished collage of songs." Will Hermes, writing for Entertainment Weekly, described the album as a "brilliantly market-tuned fusion of R&B elegance and all-ages pop sugar." He felt that "it all gets a bit samey sounding, but its sexy canter works the mood thing like a good mid-tempo mix tape; it's music to grind to without spilling your Moet."

Q editor Gareth Grundy remarked that "while Born to Do It sees him deploy the tunes and interesting facial hair of a more mature artist, David's true strength is songwriting that's perfectly in tune with the teenage daydreams of his garage-loving audience." He found that the album "offers great, dumb fun." In a mixed review, Tim Perry from The Independent praised David's "lyrical style and his willingness to try different arrangements," but found that the album lacked "depth and may well date quickly." Blender critic Neil Drumming felt that Born to Do It lacked "hip-hop." He was unsure whether it would resonate in North America.

== Legacy ==
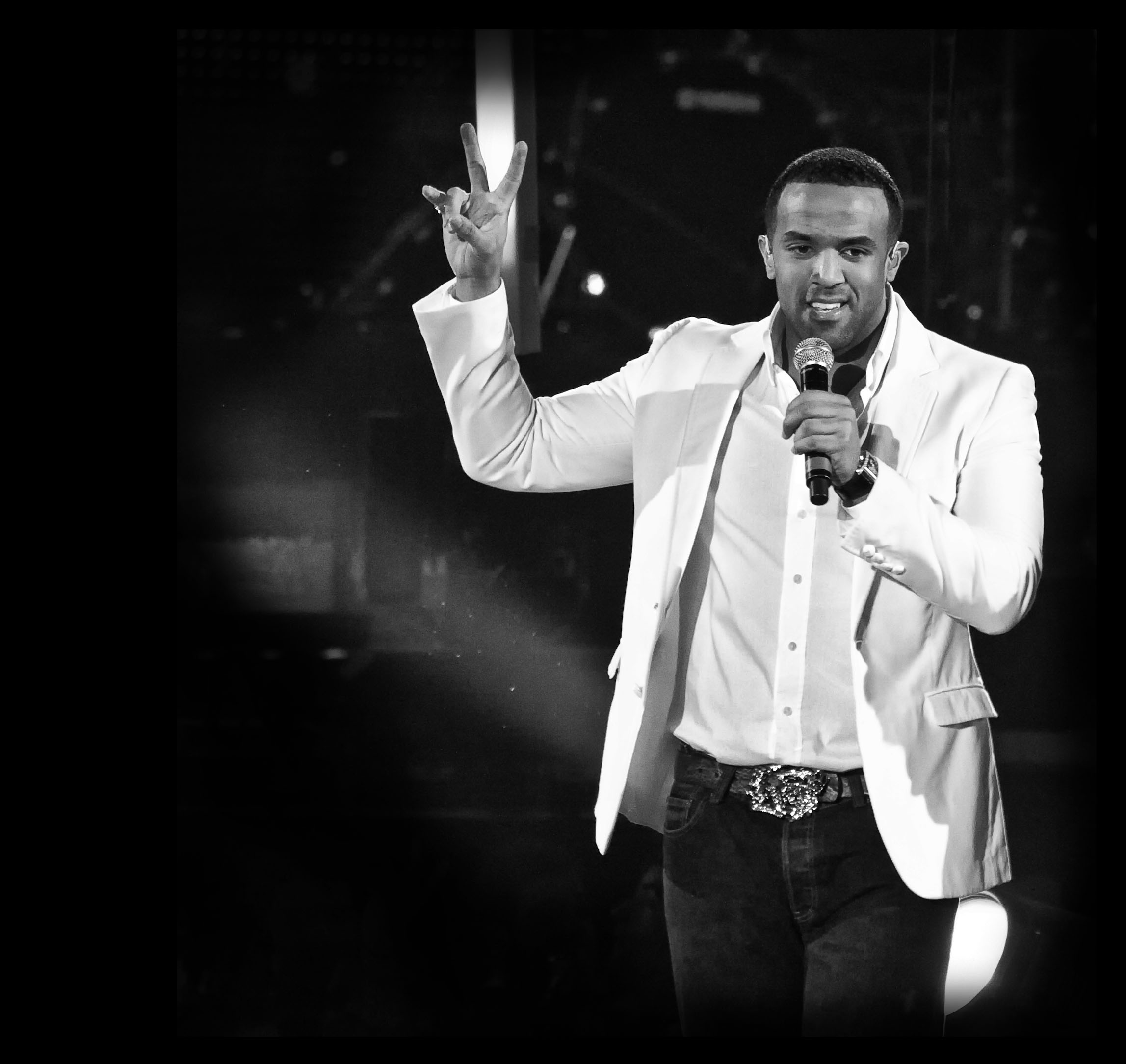
David holds the record for the fastest-selling debut album ever by a British male solo act.

At the 2001 Brit Awards, the music video for the album's second single, "7 Days" was nominated for the Best Music Video award, but lost out to the music video for "Rock DJ" by Robbie Williams. Following the album's release, David was nominated for three MOBO Awards, including best newcomer and best album for Born to Do It. David was also nominated for four Brit Awards in 2001, including Best British Album. Born to Do It became the fastest-selling debut album ever by a British male solo act, a record the album still holds. The album has since been listed as the 45th-fastest-selling album ever.

With the album's lead single going to number one in the UK, David (at 18 years and 334 days old), became the youngest British male to have a UK number-one single since Jimmy Osmond, and was the youngest solo artist at the time to have his debut single go to number one in the UK. This record has since been surpassed by Gareth Gates, who was 17 years and 255 days old when he debuted at number one with "Unchained Melody" in March 2002. The album would serve as a musical inspiration to producer Rodney Jerkins during his work on Brandy's third studio album, Full Moon, following a gig in London, England, months before where he was exposed to the UK garage collaborations between David and Artful Dodger.

In 2001, the album was the subject of a question on the ITV quiz show Who Wants to Be a Millionaire? Contestant Charles Ingram was required to identify the artist responsible for the album in order to win £32,000. Ingram claimed to be unfamiliar with Craig David but chose the answer regardless, correctly answering the question. Ingram became famous for cheating on this question and many others on the show.

In a 2009 poll devised by MTV UK to find the Greatest Album Ever, MTV UK viewers voted Born to Do It as their second-most favourite, behind Michael Jackson's Thriller.

== Track listing ==
All tracks written by Craig David and Mark Hill, except where noted.

UK version (2000)
No.	Title	Writer(s)	Length
1.	"Fill Me In"		4:16
2.	"Can't Be Messing 'Round"	David	3:54
3.	"Rendezvous"		4:37
4.	"7 Days"	David; M. Hill; Darren Hill	3:55
5.	"Follow Me"		4:01
6.	"Last Night"		4:31
7.	"Walking Away"		3:24
8.	"Time to Party"	David; M. Hill; Jim Seals	4:04
9.	"Booty Man"		3:48
10.	"Once in a Lifetime"		3:30
11.	"You Know What"		3:34
12.	"Rewind"		5:32
Total length:			49:06

US version (2001)
No.	Title	Writer(s)	Length
1.	"Fill Me In"		4:16
2.	"Can't Be Messing 'Round"	David	3:54
3.	"Rendezvous"		4:37
4.	"7 Days"	David; M. Hill; D. Hill	3:55
5.	"Follow Me"		4:01
6.	"Key to My Heart"	David; Paul	4:13
7.	"Fill Me In (Part 2)"		4:12
8.	"Last Night"		4:31
9.	"Walking Away"		3:24
10.	"Time to Party"	David; M. Hill; Seals	4:04
11.	"Booty Man"		3:48
12.	"Once in a Lifetime"		3:30
13.	"You Know What"		3:34
14.	"Rewind"		5:32
Total length:			57:31

Japanese edition (bonus tracks)
No.	Title	Length
15.	"Fill Me In (Artful Dodger mix)"	6:22
16.	"Fill Me In (Sunship vocal mix)"	5:54
Total length:		69:47

Singapore limited edition bonus CD single
No.	Title	Length
1.	"Walking Away" (radio edit)	3:27
2.	"Walking Away" (Ignorants remix)	5:16
3.	"Walking Away" (DJ Chunky remix)	5:43
4.	"Walking Away" (Treats Better Day remix)	5:22
Total length:		19:48

== Personnel ==
Credits adapted from AllMusic and album's liner notes. The track numbers correspond to the US release.

- Dick Beetham – mastering
- Andrea Brooks – design
- Craig David – vocals (all tracks), producer (track 2)
- Steve Fitzmaurice – mixing (tracks 1, 9)
- Fraser T. Smith – programming (track 2)
- Goetz – mixing engineer (tracks 8, 10, 11)
- Victoria Hallett – additional vocals (tracks 4, 8)
- Mark Hill – producer (tracks 1, 3–5, 7–14), mixing (tracks 3–6, 8, 10–14), additional vocals (tracks 3, 4)
- Wayne Lawes – remixing, vocal producer, additional production, bass, and drum programming (track 7)
- Pete Moss – photography
- Kowan Paul – producer (track 6)
- Jeremy Paul – producer (track 6)
- Rickardo Reid – keyboards and programming (track 7)
- Andy Ward – mixing engineer (track 4)
- F Zagaroli – additional vocals (track 8)

== Charts ==
=== Weekly charts ===
2000–2001 weekly chart performance for Born to Do It
Chart (2000–2001)	Peak position
Australian Albums (ARIA)	2
Australian Dance Albums (ARIA)	1
Australian Urban Albums (ARIA)	1
Austrian Albums (Ö3 Austria)	8
Belgian Albums (Ultratop Flanders)	7
Belgian Albums (Ultratop Wallonia)	7
Canadian Albums (Billboard)	3
Canadian R&B Albums (Nielsen SoundScan)	3
Danish Albums (Hitlisten)	1
Dutch Albums (Album Top 100)	1
European Top 100 Albums (Music & Media)	2
Finnish Albums (Suomen virallinen lista)	8
French Albums (SNEP)	5
German Albums (Offizielle Top 100)	3
Greek Albums (IFPI)	9
Hungarian Albums (MAHASZ)	12
Irish Albums (IRMA)	1
Italian Albums (FIMI)	7
Japanese Albums (Oricon)	42
Malaysian Albums (RIM)	1
New Zealand Albums (RMNZ)	2
Norwegian Albums (VG-lista)	2
Polish Albums (ZPAV)	8
Scottish Albums (Official Charts)	1
Spanish Albums (PROMUSICAE)	7
Swedish Albums (Sverigetopplistan)	1
Swiss Albums (Schweizer Hitparade)	6
UK Albums (Official Charts)	1
UK R&B Albums (Official Charts)	1
US Billboard 200	11
US Top R&B/Hip-Hop Albums (Billboard)	12

2025 weekly chart performance for Born to Do It
Chart (2025)	Peak position
Greek Albums (IFPI)	73

=== Year-end charts ===
Year-end chart performance for Born to Do It
Chart (2000)	Position
Australian Albums (ARIA)	56
Belgian Albums (Ultratop Flanders)	51
Belgian Albums (Ultratop Wallonia)	41
Danish Albums (Hitlisten)	25
European Albums (Music & Media)	15
Dutch Albums (Album Top 100)	16
French Albums (SNEP)	38
German Albums (Offizielle Top 100)	39
New Zealand Albums (RMNZ)	31
Swiss Albums (Schweizer Hitparade)	36
UK Albums (OCC)	6
Chart (2001)	Position
Australian Albums (ARIA)	4
Belgian Albums (Ultratop Flanders)	34
Belgian Albums (Ultratop Wallonia)	22
Canadian Albums (Nielsen SoundScan)	64
Canadian R&B Albums (Nielsen SoundScan)	13
Danish Albums (Hitlisten)	86
Dutch Albums (Album Top 100)	60
French Albums (SNEP)	23
German Albums (Offizielle Top 100)	66
New Zealand Albums (RMNZ)	7
Swedish Albums (Sverigetopplistan)	97
Swiss Albums (Schweizer Hitparade)	42
UK Albums (OCC)	45
US Billboard 200	165
Chart (2002)	Position
Canadian Albums (Nielsen SoundScan)	110
Canadian R&B Albums (Nielsen SoundScan)	22
US Billboard 200	74
US Top R&B/Hip-Hop Albums (Billboard)	73

=== Decade-end charts ===
Decade-end chart performance for Born to Do It
Chart (2000–2009)	Position
Australian Albums (ARIA)	68
UK Albums (OCC)	35

== Certifications ==
Certifications for Born to Do It
Region	Certification	Certified units/sales
Australia (ARIA)	4× Platinum	280,000^{^}
Belgium (BRMA)	2× Platinum	100,000^{*}
Canada (Music Canada)	Platinum	100,000^{^}
Denmark (IFPI Danmark)	2× Platinum	100,000^{^}
France (SNEP)	Platinum	300,000^{*}
Germany (BVMI)	Platinum	300,000^{^}
Japan (RIAJ)	Gold	100,000^{^}
Netherlands (NVPI)	2× Platinum	160,000^{^}
New Zealand (RMNZ)	3× Platinum	45,000^{^}
Spain (Promusicae)	Platinum	100,000^{^}
Sweden (GLF)	Platinum	80,000^{^}
Switzerland (IFPI Switzerland)	Platinum	50,000^{^}
United Kingdom (BPI)	6× Platinum	1,940,000
United States (RIAA)	Platinum	1,000,000^{^}
Summaries
Europe (IFPI)	3× Platinum	3,000,000^{*}
^{*} Sales figures based on certification alone.^{^} Shipments figures based on certification alone.

== See also ==
- List of UK Albums Chart number ones of the 2000s
- List of best-selling albums of the 2000s (decade) in the United Kingdom
- List of best-selling albums of the 2000s (century) in the United Kingdom

== Release history ==
Release history for Born to Do It
Region	Version	Date	Format	Label
Australia	Standard	14 August 2000	CD; vinyl	Wildstar; Atlantic
Ireland	Standard	14 August 2000	CD; vinyl	Wildstar; Atlantic
New Zealand	Standard	14 August 2000	CD; vinyl	Wildstar; Atlantic
United Kingdom	Standard	14 August 2000	CD; vinyl	Wildstar; Atlantic
Japan	Standard	6 September 2000	CD; vinyl	Wildstar; Atlantic
United States	Standard	17 July 2001	CD; vinyl	Atlantic
Various	25th Anniversary Edition	12 December 2025	TBA	Sony Music UK
