= Una parte di me (Nek album) =

Studio album by Nek
- Released: 13 May 2005
- Recorded: 2004–2005
- Genre: Pop rock, Latin pop
- Length: 34:39
- Label: Warner Music
- Producer: Nek, Alfredo Cerruti, Dado Parisini

Nek chronology
The Best of Nek: L'anno zero (2003)	Una parte di me (2005)	Nella stanza 26 (2006)

Una parte di me is the eighth studio album by Italian singer-songwriter Nek. It was released in 2005. The single "Lascia che io sia..." was one of the best selling single in Italy in 2005, selling 40,000 copies.

== Track listing ==
#	Title	Length
1	"Contromano"	3:26
2	"Lascia che io sia..."	3:32
3	"L'inquietudine"	3:27
4	"Notte bastarda"	3:13
5	"Abbracciami"	3:33
6	"Darei di più di tutto quel che ho"	3:30
7	"Va bene così"	2:52
8	"Una parte di me"	3:20
9	"Non vale un addio"	3:40
10	"Io sono qui"	4:06

== Musicians ==
- Nek – vocals, bass, acoustic guitar, electric guitar, backing vocals
- Cesare Chiodo – bass
- Max Costa – keyboards, percussions
- Gabriele Messori – trumpet
- Emiliano Fantuzzi – electric guitar, acoustic guitar, soloist guitar
- Sandro Allario – accordion
- Alfredo Golino – drums
- Gabriele Cicognani – bass
- Pier Foschi – batteria
- Dado Parisini – organ, keyboards, piano
- Andrea Rosatelli – bass
- Massimo Varini – acoustic guitar, backing vocals, electric guitar, soloist guitar, keyboards

== Charts ==
=== Weekly charts ===
Chart (2005)	Peak position
Austrian Albums (Ö3 Austria)	46
French Albums (SNEP)	170
German Albums (Offizielle Top 100)	75
Italian Albums (FIMI)	3
Spanish Albums (PROMUSICAE)	34
Swiss Albums (Schweizer Hitparade)	3

=== Year-end charts ===
Chart (2005)	Position
Swiss Albums (Schweizer Hitparade)	37

== Certifications ==
Region	Certification	Certified units/sales
Italy (FIMI)	2× Platinum	160,000^{*}
Switzerland (IFPI Switzerland)	Gold	20,000^{^}
^{*} Sales figures based on certification alone.^{^} Shipments figures based on certification alone.
