= In due =

Studio album by Nek
- Released: 5 June 1998
- Recorded: 1997–1998
- Genre: Pop rock, Latin pop
- Length: 53:59
- Label: Don't Worry
- Producer: Rolando D'Angeli

Nek chronology
Lei, gli amici e tutto il resto (1996)	In due (1998)	La vita è (2000)

In due is the fifth studio album by Italian singer-songwriter Nek. It was released on 5 June 1998. Since 1999 are reported sales of over one million copies all over the world.

== Track listing ==
#	Title	Length
1	Se io non avessi te	3:46
2	Sto con te	4:16
3	Noi due	4:08
4	Se una regola c'è	3:37
5	Ho in testa te	3:07
6	Giusto o no	4:30
7	Con un ma e con un se	3:34
8	Basta uno sguardo	4:10
9	Se vuoi se puoi	4:10
10	C'è tutto un mondo	4:13
11	Una dose di te	3:49
12	Le vibrazioni di una donna	4:23
13	Nemmeno un secondo	4:09
14	"... Non sei mai lontano"	2:07

== Charts and certifications ==
=== Weekly charts ===
Chart (1998)	Peak position
Swiss Albums Chart	2
Austrian Album Chart	3
German Album Chart	17

== Certifications ==
Region	Certification	Certified units/sales
Argentina (CAPIF)	Gold	30,000^{^}
Austria (IFPI Austria)	Gold	25,000^{*}
Italy (FIMI)	3× Platinum	300,000^{*}
Spain (PROMUSICAE)	Platinum	100,000^{^}
Switzerland (IFPI Switzerland)	Gold	25,000^{^}
^{*} Sales figures based on certification alone.^{^} Shipments figures based on certification alone.

== Reception ==
- AllMusic
