= Le cose da difendere =

Studio album by Nek
- Released: 24 May 2002
- Recorded: 2001–2002
- Genres: Pop rock, Latin pop
- Length: 42:08
- Labels: Warner Music, Don't Worry
- Producer: Rolando D'Angeli

Nek chronology
La vita è (2000)	Le cose da difendere (2002)	The Best of Nek: L'anno zero (2003)

Professional ratings
Review scores
Source	Rating
AllMusic	4/5 stars

Le cose da difendere is the seventh studio album by Italian singer-songwriter Nek. It was released in 2002.

== Track listing ==
#	Title	Length
1	Le cose da difendere	3:50
2	Sei solo tu (Featuring Laura Pausini)	3:17
3	Parliamo al singolare	3:31
4	Quando non-ci sei	3:39
5	Fatti amare	4:12
6	Cielo e terra	3:58
7	Tutto di te	3:52
8	Labirinto	4:02
9	La mia natura	3:56
10	Di conseguenza	3:50
11	Cielo e terra (Duet with Dante Thomas)	4:01

== Charts and certifications ==
=== Peak positions ===
Chart (2002)	Peak position
Italian Albums Chart	4
Swiss Albums Chart	16
German Album Chart	34
Austrian Album Chart	67
French Albums Chart	81

=== Certifications ===
Region	Certification	Certified units/sales
Italy (FIMI)	Platinum	100,000^{*}
Switzerland (IFPI Switzerland)	Gold	20,000^{^}
^{*} Sales figures based on certification alone.^{^} Shipments figures based on certification alone.
