= The Best of Nek: L'anno zero =

Greatest hits album by Nek
- Released: 10 October 2003
- Recorded: 1993–2003
- Genre: Pop rock, Latin pop
- Length: 1:10:24
- Label: Warner Music

Nek chronology
Le cose da difendere (2002)	The Best of Nek: L'anno zero (2003)	Una parte di me (2005)

The Best of Nek: L'anno zero is the first greatest hits album by Italian singer-songwriter Nek, released on 10 October 2003.

== Background ==
This album includes the best hits of ten years' career of Nek. Album also includes two new tracks: "Almeno stavolta" and "L'anno zero". Three tracks, "In te", "Cuori in tempesta" and "Angeli nel ghetto", has been released in new versions. Track "Sei solo tu", like in its studio album Le cose da difendere, has been released without vocal of Laura Pausini.

Although the album and single "Almeno stavolta" were released in October of the same year, the national, European and Latin American tour were held in 2004, after two years of live performance inactivity. Nek called the album "l'anno zero" (in English: "year zero") as it marks the end of a period in his career, not only because he matured and found more than ever how music can influence people's thinking, but felt dissatisfaction with his then on-going commercialization of career, with many and dinamic concerts to reduce the intimate relationship between the artist and the audience. At the time of the year or two of public inactivity, he traveled all over the world, especially on the Americas.

The song "Almeno stavolta" was a highly popular song, it peaked at number five on the charts and remained in the Top 10 for 12 weeks.

== Reception ==
Professional ratings
Review scores
Source	Rating
Allmusic	4/5 stars

The album is generally positively received. Marisa Brown, of Allmusic, said that it begins with, at the time, "two new tracks, "Almeno Stavolta" and "L'Anno Zero," but then moves immediately into a chronological overview of Nek's repertoire, beginning with his first single, "In Te," which he presented at Sanremo in 1993, and going all the way to "Cielo e Terra," which appeared on his 2002 album, Le cose da difendere". Brown, who gave the album a four out of five stars rating, concluded that the new "bonus tracks, while both good and very much in the vein of what Nek has done and continues to do in the 21st century, might not be enough to warrant a purchase for someone who already owns all his other albums", "but for someone who's heard the singles and wants a more comprehensive understanding of the artist, it is a very good buy".

== Track listing ==
#	Title	Length
1	Almeno stavolta	3:27
2	L'anno zero	3:27
3	In te	4:03
4	Cuori in tempesta	4:43
5	Angeli nel ghetto	4:02
6	Dimmi cos'è	3:41
7	Tu sei, tu sai	4:18
8	Laura non-c'è	3:46
9	Sei grande	3:57
10	Se io non-avessi te	3:48
11	Sto con te	4:16
12	Se una regola c'è	3:36
13	Ci sei tu	4:19
14	Sul treno	3:55
15	La vita è	4:19
16	Sei solo tu	3:15
17	Parliamo al singolare	3:32
18	Cielo e terra	4:00

== Charts and certifications ==
=== Peak positions ===
Chart (2003)	Peak position
Italian Albums Chart	3
Spanish Albums Chart	14
Swiss Albums Chart	12

=== Certifications ===
Region	Certification	Certified units/sales
Italy (FIMI)	3× Platinum	300,000^{*}
^{*} Sales figures based on certification alone.
