= Fill Me In =

2000 single by Craig David

- UK CD1 single

Single by Craig David

from the album Born to Do It
- B-side: "Apartment 543"
- Released: 3 April 2000
- Genre: 2-step garage; R&B
- Length: 4:16 (album version); 3:53 (radio edit)
- Label: Wildstar
- Songwriters: Craig David; Mark Hill
- Producer: Mark Hill

Craig David singles chronology
"Re-Rewind (The Crowd Say Bo Selecta)" (1999)	"Fill Me In" (2000)	"Woman Trouble" (2000)

Music video
- "Fill Me In" on YouTube

"Fill Me In" is a song by British singer Craig David. It was released as his debut solo single on 3 April 2000, serving as the lead single from his debut studio album, Born to Do It (2000). The song debuted at number one on the UK Singles Chart on 9 April 2000. "Fill Me In" was then released in the United States on 22 May 2001 and peaked at number 15 on the Billboard Hot 100. According to the Official Charts Company, it was the 10th-best-selling single of 2000 in the UK, having sold 573,000 copies.

The track started life as an Artful Dodger bootleg remix of BBMak's "Still on Your Side", centred around a guitar sample loop.

== Content ==
The narrator tells a story of trying to spend time with the girl next door, but her parents remain suspicious about what she is doing.

== Chart performance ==
After his success with Artful Dodger, David's first solo hit debuted at number one in the UK top 40 on the week of 15 April 2000. "Fill Me In" topped the charts during a week in which all of the top six positions were new entries. After one week atop the chart, "Fill Me In" dropped to number two for two weeks, replaced at number one by Fragma's "Toca's Miracle". The single logged 10 weeks inside the top 40. On 28 December 2009, when BBC Radio 1 presenter Nihal revealed "The Official Top 100 Songs of the Decade", "Fill Me In" was at number 93.

The single was released in the United States on 22 May 2001. On 30 June, "Fill Me In" entered the Billboard Hot 100 top 40 at number 28. The song climbed into the top 20 the following week, remaining there until October and peaking at number 15 on 1 September. In total, David remained 23 weeks inside the US top 40 before leaving on 8 December.

== Music video ==
There are different versions of the music video released in the United Kingdom and in the United States. The UK music video, directed by Max & Dania, has David telling a story about how he tried many times to romance his girlfriend who lived next door to him but each of his attempts to be alone with his girlfriend failed as his girlfriend's parents always interrupted and he had to hide before they left again. According to an interview on his first Greatest Hits album, the girl in the UK music video is a South African woman whose identity has never been known. The US version, directed by Darren Grant, has a different video and this time David's girlfriend is mixed race.

== Track listings ==
UK CD1

1. "Fill Me In" (radio edit) – 3:52
2. "Apartment 543" – 4:21
3. "Fill Me In" (Artful Dodger Bootleg mix) – 3:59
4. "Fill Me In" (video CD-ROM) – 3:52

UK CD2

1. "Fill Me In" (radio edit) – 3:52
2. "Fill Me In" (Artful Dodger remix) – 5:53
3. "Fill Me In" (Sunship remix) – 5:38
4. "Fill Me In" (Full Crew remix) – 4:18

UK cassette single and Japanese CD single

1. "Fill Me In" (radio edit) – 3:52
2. "Apartment 543" – 4:21
3. "Fill Me In" (Artful Dodger Bootleg mix) – 3:59

European CD single

1. "Fill Me In" (radio edit) – 3:52
2. "Fill Me In" (Sunship remix) – 5:38

European maxi-CD single

1. "Fill Me In" (radio edit) – 3:52
2. "Fill Me In" (Artful Dodger's Bootleg mix) – 3:59
3. "Fill Me In" (Artful Dodger remix) – 5:53
4. "Fill Me In" (Full Crew remix) – 4:18
5. "Fill Me In" (Sunship remix) – 5:38

Australian CD single

1. "Fill Me In" (radio edit) – 3:52
2. "Fill Me In" (Artful Dodger's Bootleg mix) – 3:59
3. "Apartment 543" – 4:21
4. "Fill Me In" (Sunship remix) – 5:38
5. "Fill Me In" (Full Crew remix) – 4:18
6. "Fill Me In" (Artful Dodger mix) – 5:53
7. "Fill Me In" (video CD-ROM)

US CD single

1. "Fill Me In" (radio edit) – 3:50
2. "Fill Me In" (Full Crew remix) – 4:12
3. Snippets ("Rendezvous" / "7 Days" / "Walking Away")

Canadian CD single

1. "Fill Me In" (album version) – 4:15
2. "Fill Me In" (Full Crew mix) – 4:12
3. "Fill Me In" (Blacksmith mix) – 3:20
4. "Fill Me In" (Sunship remix) – 5:53
5. "Fill Me In" (Artful Dodger remix) – 6:21
6. "Fill Me In" (Artful Dodger Bootleg remix) – 6:05
7. "Fill Me In" (album instrumental) – 4:12
8. "Fill Me In" (radio edit) – 3:50
9. "Fill Me In" (live) – 10:36

== Charts ==
=== Weekly charts ===
Weekly chart performance for "Fill Me In"
Chart (2000–2001)	Peak position
Australia (ARIA)	6
Belgium (Ultratop 50 Flanders)	28
Belgium (Ultratip Bubbling Under Wallonia)	6
Canada (Nielsen SoundScan)	4
Canada CHR (Nielsen BDS)	5
Europe (Eurochart Hot 100)	10
France (SNEP)	34
Germany (GfK)	37
Iceland (Íslenski Listinn Topp 40)	24
Ireland (IRMA)	7
Netherlands (Dutch Top 40)	5
Netherlands (Single Top 100)	8
New Zealand (Recorded Music NZ)	11
Norway (VG-lista)	16
Scottish Singles Sales (Official Charts)	5
Sweden (Sverigetopplistan)	28
Switzerland (Schweizer Hitparade)	45
UK Singles (Official Charts)	1
UK Indie (Official Charts)	39
UK Hip Hop/R&B (Official Charts)	1
US Billboard Hot 100	15
US Dance Singles Sales (Billboard) Remixes	2
US Hot R&B/Hip-Hop Songs (Billboard)	19
US Pop Airplay (Billboard)	7
US Rhythmic Airplay (Billboard)	10

=== Year-end charts ===
2000 year-end chart performance for "Fill Me In"
Chart (2000)	Position
Australia (ARIA)	68
Europe (Eurochart Hot 100)	90
Ireland (IRMA)	65
Netherlands (Dutch Top 40)	40
Netherlands (Single Top 100)	59
UK Singles (OCC)	10
UK Urban (Music Week)	8

2001 year-end chart performance for "Fill Me In"
Chart (2001)	Position
Canada (Nielsen SoundScan)	19
US Billboard Hot 100	37
US Hot R&B/Hip-Hop Singles & Tracks (Billboard)	85
US Mainstream Top 40 (Billboard)	39
US Maxi-Singles Sales (Billboard)	18
US Rhythmic Top 40 (Billboard)	34

2002 year-end chart performance for "Fill Me In"
Chart (2002)	Position
Canada (Nielsen SoundScan)	141

=== Decade-end charts ===
Decade-end chart performance for "Fill Me In"
Chart (2000–2009)	Position
UK Top 100 Songs of the Decade	93

== Certifications ==
Certifications and sales for "Fill Me In"
Region	Certification	Certified units/sales
Australia (ARIA)	Gold	35,000^{^}
New Zealand (RMNZ) Physical sales	Gold	5,000^{*}
New Zealand (RMNZ) Digital sales + streaming	Gold	15,000^{‡}
United Kingdom (BPI)	2× Platinum	1,200,000^{‡}
^{*} Sales figures based on certification alone.^{^} Shipments figures based on certification alone.^{‡} Sales+streaming figures based on certification alone.

== Release history ==
Release dates and formats for "Fill Me In"
Region	Date	Format(s)	Label(s)	Ref.
United Kingdom	3 April 2000	12-inch vinyl; CD; cassette	Wildstar	
Japan	26 July 2000	CD	Telstar	
United States	22 May 2001	Contemporary hit radio; rhythmic contemporary; urban radio	Atlantic	

=== Loud Luxury version ===
In 2017, Canadian house music production and DJ duo Loud Luxury released a version of the song which features Ryan Shepherd. In 2022, the song was certified gold in Canada.

==== Certifications ====
Certifications and sales for "Fill Me In"
Region	Certification	Certified units/sales
Canada (Music Canada)	Gold	40,000^{‡}
^{‡} Sales+streaming figures based on certification alone.
