= Laura non c'è =

Single by Nek

from the album Lei, gli amici e tutto il resto
- Released: February 1997
- Recorded: 1997
- Genre: Pop rock
- Length: 3:58
- Label: Don't Worry
- Songwriters: Nek; Massimo Varini; Antonello De Sanctis

Nek singles chronology
"Vivere senza te" (1996)	"Laura non c'è" (1997)	"Sei grande" (1997)

Music video
- "Laura non c'è" on YouTube

"Laura non c'è" ("Laura Is Not Here") is a pop-rock song written and performed by Italian singer Nek. It was released as the second single from his fourth album Lei, gli amici e tutto il resto (1997) and achieved a huge success in Italy, Europe and Latin America. The song was Nek's entry in the Sanremo Music Festival 1997. Other versions include "Laura Is Away" in English, and "Laura no está" in Spanish.

== Track listing ==
1. "Laura non c'è" (album version) – 3:46
2. "Laura non c'è" (radio vocal version) – 3:58

== Other versions ==
In Spain, Latin America and the United States, a Spanish-language version of the song, "Laura no está", was released, peaking at no. 21 in the Billboard Hot Latin Songs Chart in the week of 23 May 1998.

An English version of the song, "Laura Is Away", was also released in the United Kingdom, the song managed to reach no. 59 in the UK Singles Chart.

In 1999, a Greek-language version was released by Greek singer Nektarios Sfirakis under the title "Sképsou kalá" (Σκέψου καλά).

In 2004, Belgian singer Wim Soutaer released the single in Dutch as "Voor altijd", reaching no. 1 in the Ultratop charts.

In 2005, an Italian-French version was released by Nek and French singer Céréna.

== Charts ==
Chart (1997–1998)	Peak position
Austria (Ö3 Austria Top 40)	3
Belgium (Ultratop 50 Flanders)	34
Belgium (Ultratop 50 Wallonia)	7
France (SNEP)	11
Germany (GfK)	10
Italy (FIMI)	1
Netherlands (Single Top 100)	53
Switzerland (Schweizer Hitparade)	2
US Billboard Hot Latin Songs	21
US Billboard Latin Pop Songs	19
UK Singles (Official Charts)	59

=== Year-end charts ===
Chart (1997)	Position
Belgium (Ultratop 50 Wallonia)	44

Chart (1998)	Position
Austria (Ö3 Austria Top 40)	33
France (SNEP)	81
Germany (Official German Charts)	41
Switzerland (Schweizer Hitparade)	25

== Certifications and sales ==
Region	Certification	Certified units/sales
Argentina	—	30,000
France (SNEP)	Gold	250,000^{*}
Italy (FIMI)	Gold	25,000^{‡}
Spain (Promusicae)	Gold	30,000^{‡}
^{*} Sales figures based on certification alone.^{‡} Sales+streaming figures based on certification alone.
