= 7 Days (Craig David song) =

2000 single by Craig David

- Standard UK and international artwork

Single by Craig David

from the album Born to Do It
- B-side: "Stop Messing Around"
- Released: 24 July 2000
- Genre: R&B
- Length: 3:56 (album version); 3:26 (radio edit)
- Label: Wildstar
- Songwriters: Craig David; Mark Hill; Darren Hill
- Producer: Mark Hill

Craig David singles chronology
"Woman Trouble" (2000)	"7 Days" (2000)	"Walking Away" (2000)

Music video
- "7 Days'" on YouTube

"7 Days" is a song by British singer Craig David. It was released on 24 July 2000 as the second single from his debut studio album, Born to Do It (2000). "7 Days" topped the UK Singles Chart and peaked within the top 10 of the charts in several countries, including Australia, Canada, Denmark, Ireland, the Netherlands, New Zealand and the United States. In the US, it became David's highest-charting hit, peaking at number 10 on the Billboard Hot 100.

"7 Days" has received a 3× platinum sales certification from the British Phonographic Industry (BPI) and was Britain's 17th-best-selling single of 2000. In 2001, the song was nominated for the BRIT Award for Best Single (losing out to Robbie Williams' "Rock DJ"), and in 2003, it was nominated for the Grammy Award for Best Male Pop Vocal Performance. There is also a remix produced by DJ Premier featuring Mos Def.

== Chart performance ==
On 30 July 2000, the song debuted at number one on the UK Singles Chart after selling more than 100,000 copies in its first week, giving David his second consecutive UK number-one single and spending 15 weeks inside the UK top 75. It became David's only top-10 single on the Billboard Hot 100 in the United States, peaking at number 10. The song also peaked at number four on the ARIA Singles Chart in Australia and number six on the RIANZ Singles Chart in New Zealand.

== Music video ==
At the 2001 BRIT Awards, the video was nominated for the Award for Best Music Video but lost out to the video for "Rock DJ" by Robbie Williams.

== Track listings ==
UK CD1

1. "7 Days" (radio edit)
2. "Stop Messing Around"
3. "Fill Me In" (acoustic)
4. "7 Days" (video)

UK CD2

1. "7 Days" (radio edit)
2. "7 Days" (Full Crew radio mix)
3. "7 Days" (Sunship remix)
4. "7 Days" (Full Crew remix featuring MDK)

UK cassette single

1. "7 Days" (radio edit)
2. "Fill Me In" (acoustic)

European CD single

1. "7 Days" (radio edit) – 3:54
2. "7 Days" (Full Crew radio mix) – 4:43

Australian CD single

1. "7 Days" (radio edit)
2. "7 Days" (Full Crew remix edit)
3. "7 Days" (Sunship remix)
4. "7 Days" (Full Crew remix featuring MDK)
5. "Fill Me In" (acoustic)
6. "7 Days" (video)

Japanese CD single

1. "7 Days" (radio edit)
2. "7 Days" (Full Crew radio mix)
3. "7 Days" (Sunship remix)

US and Canadian CD single

1. "7 Days" (DJ Premier remix) – 4:22
2. "7 Days" (DJ Premier remix without rap) – 2:59
3. "7 Days" (featuring Fat Joe) – 4:53
4. "7 Days" (Full Crew remix) – 4:22
5. "7 Days" (acoustic) – 4:39
6. "7 Days" (Sunship remix) – 6:40
7. "7 Days" (video)

== Charts ==
=== Weekly charts ===
Weekly chart performance for "7 Days"
Chart (2000–2002)	Peak position
Australia (ARIA)	4
Australian Dance (ARIA)	2
Australian Urban (ARIA)	4
Belgium (Ultratop 50 Flanders)	25
Belgium (Ultratop 50 Wallonia)	12
Canada (Nielsen SoundScan)	9
Canada CHR (Nielsen BDS)	7
Denmark (IFPI)	9
Europe (Eurochart Hot 100)	11
Finland (Suomen virallinen lista)	17
France (SNEP)	19
Germany (GfK)	22
Iceland (Íslenski Listinn Topp 40)	14
Ireland (IRMA)	3
Italy (FIMI)	9
Netherlands (Dutch Top 40)	6
Netherlands (Single Top 100)	7
New Zealand (Recorded Music NZ)	6
Norway (VG-lista)	11
Poland (PiF PaF)	6
Scottish Singles Sales (Official Charts)	2
Sweden (Sverigetopplistan)	21
Switzerland (Schweizer Hitparade)	20
UK Singles (Official Charts)	1
UK Hip Hop/R&B (Official Charts)	1
US Billboard Hot 100	10
US Hot R&B/Hip-Hop Songs (Billboard)	52
US Pop Airplay (Billboard)	6
US Rhythmic Airplay (Billboard)	10

=== Year-end charts ===
2000 year-end chart performance for "7 Days"
Chart (2000)	Position
Belgium (Ultratop 50 Wallonia)	51
Europe (Eurochart Hot 100)	66
Iceland (Íslenski Listinn Topp 40)	87
Ireland (IRMA)	36
Netherlands (Dutch Top 40)	45
Netherlands (Single Top 100)	43
Switzerland (Schweizer Hitparade)	66
UK Singles (OCC)	17
UK Urban (Music Week)	26

2001 year-end chart performance for "7 Days"
Chart (2001)	Position
Australia (ARIA)	58
France (SNEP)	85

2002 year-end chart performance for "7 Days"
Chart (2002)	Position
Canada (Nielsen SoundScan)	95
US Billboard Hot 100	52
US Mainstream Top 40 (Billboard)	27
US Rhythmic Top 40 (Billboard)	43

== Certifications ==
Certifications and sales for "7 Days"
Region	Certification	Certified units/sales
Australia (ARIA)	Platinum	70,000^{^}
Denmark (IFPI Danmark)	Platinum	90,000^{‡}
France (SNEP)	Gold	250,000^{*}
Germany (BVMI)	Gold	250,000^{‡}
Italy (FIMI)	Gold	50,000^{‡}
New Zealand (RMNZ) Physical sales	Gold	5,000^{*}
New Zealand (RMNZ) Digital sales + streaming	3× Platinum	90,000^{‡}
United Kingdom (BPI)	3× Platinum	1,800,000^{‡}
^{*} Sales figures based on certification alone.^{^} Shipments figures based on certification alone.^{‡} Sales+streaming figures based on certification alone.

== Release history ==
Release dates and formats for "7 Days"
Region	Date	Format(s)	Label(s)	Ref.
United Kingdom	24 July 2000	CD; cassette	Wildstar	
Japan	21 October 2000	CD	Victor Entertainment	
United States	16 October 2001	Rhythmic contemporary; urban radio	Atlantic	
United States	6 November 2001	Contemporary hit radio	Atlantic	
