= Walking Away (Craig David song) =

2000 single by Craig David

Single by Craig David

from the album Born to Do It
- B-side: "Human"
- Released: 20 November 2000
- Genre: Pop rock; R&B
- Length: 3:24 (original version); 3:31 (new version)
- Label: Wildstar
- Songwriters: Craig David; Mark Hill
- Producer: Mark Hill

Craig David singles chronology
"7 Days" (2000)	"Walking Away" (2000)	"Rendezvous" (2001)

Music videos
- "Walking Away" on YouTube; "Walking Away" (US version) on YouTube

"Walking Away" is a song by English singer Craig David. It was written by David and Mark Hill and released as the third single from his debut studio album, Born to Do It (2000), on 20 November 2000. It reached number three in the United Kingdom and number one in New Zealand, where it was the most successful song of 2001 according to the Recording Industry Association of New Zealand (RIANZ).

In 2008, the track was re-recorded for David's Greatest Hits compilation, released in November 2008 in the United Kingdom. The new versions each feature a different artist: Lynnsha on the French version, Nek on the Italian version, Álex Ubago on the Spanish version and Monrose on the German version. Monrose's vocals were sung in English rather than in German, whereas the other artists sang in their native languages.

== Music videos ==
=== Original version ===
There are two versions of the video. The European music video begins with David with his girlfriend in a car, where she is seen yelling at him. He turns on the radio and the song starts. He then gets out of the car and the landscape continually changes, showing different places. This was directed by Max & Dania.

The US version starts with an acapella sample of the Ignorants remix, leading into the actual song. The video shows him "walking away" from troubles in his life: a flooded apartment, a fire in his 67 Camaro convertible, electrical problems at the train station, and a tornado at the end of the video. This was directed by Lenny Bass.

=== Greatest Hits version ===
New versions of the songs were recorded and shot in 2008, and it features Lynnsha on the French version, Nek on the Italian version, Álex Ubago on the Spanish version and Monrose on the German version. The video was shot in black and white, and the guest artist is seen in some scenes. Sometimes, the two singers are seen together.

== Track listings ==
UK CD1 and Japanese CD single

1. "Walking Away"
2. "Human"
3. "7 Days" (live vibe in Amsterdam)

UK CD2

1. "Walking Away" (radio edit)
2. "Walking Away" (Ignorants remix featuring Trell)
3. "Walking Away" (DJ Chunky remix featuring MC B-Live)
4. "Walking Away" (Treats (Better Day) remix)

UK cassette single

1. "Walking Away"
2. "Human"
3. "Walking Away" (Ignorants remix featuring Trell)

European CD single

1. "Walking Away" – 3:27
2. "7 Days" (live in Stockholm) – 7:00

Australian CD single

1. "Walking Away" – 3:27
2. "Human" – 4:01
3. "7 Days" (live in Stockholm) – 7:00
4. "Walking Away" (Ignorants remix featuring Trell) – 5:16
5. "Walking Away" (DJ Chunky remix featuring MC B-Live) – 5:43
6. "Walking Away" (Treats Better Day remix) – 5:22

US 7-inch single

1. "Walking Away"
2. "Time to Party"

US 12-inch single

A1. "Walking Away" (album version) – 3:26
A2. "Walking Away" (album instrumental) – 3:26
A3. "Walking Away" (album acapella) – 3:03
B1. "Walking Away" (Ignorants remix featuring Trell) – 5:18
B2. "Walking Away" (Ignorants remix instrumental) – 4:43
B3. "Walking Away" (Ignorants remix acapella) – 3:56

== Charts ==
=== Weekly charts ===
Chart (2000–2002)	Peak position
Australia (ARIA)	5
Australian Dance (ARIA)	2
Australian Urban (ARIA)	3
Austria (Ö3 Austria Top 40)	45
Belgium (Ultratop 50 Flanders)	21
Belgium (Ultratop 50 Wallonia)	18
Canada CHR (Nielsen BDS)	11
Croatia (HRT)	5
Denmark (Tracklisten)	14
Europe (Eurochart Hot 100)	12
France (SNEP)	22
Germany (GfK)	46
Greece (IFPI)	10
Hungary (Mahasz)	2
Iceland (Íslenski Listinn Topp 40)	24
Ireland (IRMA)	9
Italy (FIMI)	15
Netherlands (Dutch Top 40)	7
Netherlands (Single Top 100)	11
New Zealand (Recorded Music NZ)	1
Norway (VG-lista)	6
Poland Airplay (Music & Media)	4
Poland (Polish Airplay Chart)	1
Romania (Romanian Top 100)	8
Scottish Singles Sales (Official Charts)	7
Spain (Promusicae)	22
Sweden (Sverigetopplistan)	13
Switzerland (Schweizer Hitparade)	24
UK Singles (Official Charts)	3
UK Hip Hop/R&B (Official Charts)	2
US Billboard Hot 100	44
US Pop Airplay (Billboard)	17

=== Year-end charts ===
Chart (2000)	Position
Ireland (IRMA)	80
UK Singles (OCC)	72

Chart (2001)	Position
Australia (ARIA)	30
Europe (Eurochart Hot 100)	69
France (SNEP)	72
New Zealand (RIANZ)	1
Romania (Romanian Top 100)	75

Chart (2002)	Position
Canada Radio (Nielsen BDS)	59
US Mainstream Top 40 (Billboard)	58

== Certifications ==
Region	Certification	Certified units/sales
Australia (ARIA)	Platinum	70,000^{^}
Denmark (IFPI Danmark)	Gold	45,000^{‡}
New Zealand (RMNZ) Physical sales	Gold	5,000^{*}
New Zealand (RMNZ) Digital sales + streaming	Gold	15,000^{‡}
United Kingdom (BPI)	Platinum	600,000^{‡}
^{*} Sales figures based on certification alone.^{^} Shipments figures based on certification alone.^{‡} Sales+streaming figures based on certification alone.

== Release history ==
Region	Date	Format(s)	Label(s)	Ref(s).
United Kingdom	20 November 2000	CD	Wildstar	
Germany	28 November 2000	Maxi-CD	Edel	
Japan	24 January 2001	CD	Victor Entertainment	
United States	25 March 2002	Rhythmic contemporary radio	Atlantic	
United States	1 April 2002	Contemporary hit radio	Atlantic	
United States	7 May 2002	Hot adult contemporary radio	Atlantic	
