= Brit Awards 2017 =

British music awards ceremony

- Date: 22 February 2017
- Venue: The O2 Arena
- Hosted by: Dermot O'Leary; Emma Willis

Highlights
- Most awards: David Bowie and Rag'n'Bone Man (2)
- Most nominations: Anne-Marie (4)

Television/radio coverage
- Network: ITV; ITV2 (Red Carpet); YouTube
- Viewership: 5.4 million

Brit Awards 2017 was held on 22 February 2017 and was the 37th edition of the British Phonographic Industry's annual pop music awards. The awards ceremony were held at The O2 Arena in London. Emma Willis hosted The Brits Are Coming, the launch show to reveal this year's nominees which was broadcast live for the first time, on 14 January 2017. Robbie Williams was given the Brits Icon Award the previous November during a special concert held in his honour at Troxy in London. Architect Dame Zaha Hadid designed the Brit Award statuette that was to be given to the winners.

On 13 January 2017, it was confirmed that YouTube star Caspar Lee would be the BRITs Digital Presenter. Singer Michael Bublé was set to host but later pulled out on 18 January 2017 due to his son battling liver cancer and is "determined to focus on his son's recovery". On 31 January 2017, it was confirmed that Dermot O'Leary and Emma Willis would present the ceremony, replacing Bublé. Alice Levine, Clara Amfo and Laura Jackson covered the goss from Red Carpet and Backstage on ITV2.

The ceremony included a tribute to the late George Michael, which was presented by former Wham! member Andrew Ridgeley alongside associated duo members Helen "Pepsi" DeMacque and Shirlie Holliman. The lead vocalist of Coldplay, Chris Martin, sang "A Different Corner" in the tribute.

== Performances ==
=== Pre-ceremony ===
Artist	Song	UK Singles Chart reaction	UK Albums Chart reaction
Craig David	"Nothing Like This" "Ain't Giving Up"	N/A	Following My Intuition – 55 (+3)
Christine and the Queens	"Tilted"	97 (re-entry)	Chaleur humaine – 36 (–5)
Calum Scott	"Dancing On My Own"	46 (+2)	N/A
Rag'n'Bone Man	"Human"	2 (+/–)	N/A

=== Main show ===
Artist	Song	UK Singles Chart reaction	UK Albums Chart reaction
Little Mix	"Shout Out to My Ex"	36 (–1)	Glory Days – 8 (+1)
Bruno Mars	"That's What I Like"	72 (debut)	24K Magic – 12 (+2)
Emeli Sandé	"Hurts"	N/A	Long Live the Angels – 28 (+6)
The 1975	"The Sound"	68 (re-entry)	The 1975 – 59 (+26); I Like It When You Sleep, for You Are So Beautiful yet So Unaware of It – 18 (+34)
Chris Martin; George Michael	"A Different Corner"	N/A	Ladies & Gentlemen: The Best of George Michael – 11 (+2); Twenty Five – 72 (+3)
Katy Perry; Skip Marley	"Chained to the Rhythm"	5 (+2)	N/A
Skepta	"Shutdown"	N/A	Konnichiwa – 71 (re-entry)
The Chainsmokers; Coldplay	"Something Just Like This"	30 (debut)	N/A
Ed Sheeran; Stormzy	"Castle on the Hill" "Shape of You (Stormzy Remix)"	4 (-1); N/A	+ – 13 (+6) x – 4 (+3)
Robbie Williams	"The Heavy Entertainment Show" "Love My Life" "Mixed Signals"	N/A	The Heavy Entertainment Show – 48 (-1)

== Winners and nominees ==
The nominations were revealed on 14 January 2017.

British Album of the Year (presented by Noel Gallagher)	Special Achievement Award
David Bowie – Blackstar (Posthumous); The 1975 – I Like It When You Sleep, for You Are So Beautiful yet So Unaware of It; Kano – Made in the Manor; Michael Kiwanuka – Love & Hate; Skepta – Konnichiwa	Global Success Award: Adele (presented by Naomi Campbell & Jonathan Ross); Icon Award: Robbie Williams (presented by Take That)
British Single of the Year (presented by Fearne Cotton & Holly Willoughby)	British Video of the Year (presented by Simon Cowell & Nicole Scherzinger)
Little Mix – "Shout Out to My Ex"; Alan Walker – "Faded"; Calum Scott - "Dancing On My Own"; Calvin Harris featuring Rihanna – "This Is What You Came For"; Clean Bandit featuring Sean Paul & Anne-Marie – "Rockabye"; Coldplay – "Hymn for the Weekend"; James Arthur – "Say You Won't Let Go"; Jonas Blue featuring Dakota – "Fast Car"; Tinie Tempah featuring Zara Larsson – "Girls Like"; Zayn – "Pillowtalk"	One Direction – "History" ^{1}; Coldplay – "Hymn for the Weekend"; James Arthur – "Say You Won't Let Go"; Little Mix featuring Sean Paul – "Hair"; Zayn – "Pillowtalk" Eliminated; Adele – "Send My Love (To Your New Lover)"; Calvin Harris featuring Rihanna – "This Is What You Came For"; Clean Bandit featuring Sean Paul & Anne-Marie – "Rockabye"; Jonas Blue featuring Dakota – "Fast Car"; Tinie Tempah featuring Zara Larsson – "Girls Like"
British Male Solo Artist (presented by Zane Lowe)	British Female Solo Artist (presented by David Tennant)
David Bowie (Posthumous); Craig David; Kano; Michael Kiwanuka; Skepta	Emeli Sandé; Anohni; Ellie Goulding; Lianne La Havas; Nao
British Group (presented by Maisie Williams & Romesh Ranganathan)	British Breakthrough Act (presented by Nick Grimshaw & Rita Ora)
The 1975; Bastille; Biffy Clyro; Little Mix; Radiohead	Rag'n'Bone Man; Anne-Marie; Blossoms; Skepta; Stormzy
International Male Solo Artist (presented by Alice Levine, Clara Amfo & Laura Jackson)	International Female Solo Artist (presented by Alice Levine, Clara Amfo & Laura Jackson)
Drake; Bon Iver; Bruno Mars; Leonard Cohen (Posthumous); The Weeknd	Beyoncé; Christine and the Queens; Rihanna; Sia; Solange
International Group (presented by Alice Levine, Clara Amfo & Laura Jackson)	Critics' Choice Award (presented by Emeli Sandé)
A Tribe Called Quest; Drake and Future; Kings of Leon; Nick Cave and the Bad Seeds; Twenty One Pilots	Rag'n'Bone Man; Anne-Marie; Dua Lipa

^{1} Liam Payne accept this award for British Video of the Year.

== Multiple nominations and awards ==
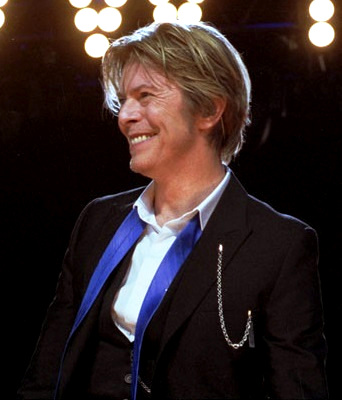
Two-time posthumous winner David Bowie

Artists that received multiple nominations
Nominations	Artist
4	Anne-Marie
3 (4)	Little Mix
3 (4)	Rihanna
3 (4)	Skepta
3 (4)	Sean Paul
2 (15)	The 1975
2 (15)	Calvin Harris
2 (15)	Clean Bandit
2 (15)	Coldplay
2 (15)	Dakota
2 (15)	David Bowie
2 (15)	Drake
2 (15)	James Arthur
2 (15)	Jonas Blue
2 (15)	Kano
2 (15)	Michael Kiwanuka
2 (15)	Rag'n'Bone Man
2 (15)	Tinie Tempah
2 (15)	Zara Larsson
2 (15)	Zayn Malik

Artists that received multiple awards
Awards	Artist
2 (2)	David Bowie
2 (2)	Rag'n'Bone Man

== Brit Awards 2017 album ==
Brit Awards 2017

Compilation album / Box set by Various Artists
- Released: 17 February 2017
- Label: UMTV

Various Artists chronology
Brit Awards 2016 (2016)	''Brit Awards 2017'' (2017)	Brit Awards 2018 (2018)

The Brit Awards 2017 is a compilation and box set which includes the "63 biggest tracks from the past year". The box set has three discs with a total of sixty-three songs by various artists.

=== Track listing ===
==== CD 1 ====
No.	Title	Artist(s)	Length
1.	"Rockabye"	Clean Bandit featuring Sean Paul & Anne-Marie	4:10
2.	"Starboy"	The Weeknd featuring Daft Punk	3:48
3.	"Cold Water"	Major Lazer featuring Justin Bieber & MØ	3:06
4.	"Can't Stop the Feeling!"	Justin Timberlake	3:55
5.	"Lush Life"	Zara Larsson	3:20
6.	"Shout Out to My Ex"	Little Mix	3:46
7.	"Cheap Thrills"	Sia featuring Sean Paul	3:42
8.	"Closer"	The Chainsmokers featuring Halsey	4:04
9.	"Pillowtalk"	ZAYN	3:24
10.	"I Took a Pill in Ibiza"	Mike Posner	3:15
11.	"Don't Wanna Know"	Maroon 5	3:34
12.	"7 Years"	Lukas Graham	3:57
13.	"Say You Won't Let Go"	James Arthur	3:30
14.	"All My Friends"	Snakehips featuring Tinashe & Chance the Rapper	3:50
15.	"Hymn for the Weekend"	Coldplay	4:19
16.	"Stitches"	Shawn Mendes	3:26
17.	"Cake by the Ocean"	DNCE	3:38
18.	"Work from Home"	Fifth Harmony featuring Ty Dolla Sign	3:35
19.	"Side to Side"	Ariana Grande featuring Nicki Minaj	3:44
20.	"Starving"	Hailee Steinfeld & Grey featuring Zedd	3:01
21.	"Still Falling for You"	Ellie Goulding	3:40

==== CD 2 ====
No.	Title	Artist(s)	Length
1.	"Girls Like"	Tinie Tempah featuring Zara Larsson	3:15
2.	"Fast Car"	Jonas Blue featuring Dakota	3:31
3.	"Faded"	Alan Walker	3:32
4.	"Sexual"	Neiked featuring Dyo	3:09
5.	"This Girl"	Kungs vs. Cookin' on 3 Burners	3:16
6.	"No Money"	Galantis	3:07
7.	"When the Bassline Drops"	Craig David & Big Narstie	3:05
8.	"Shutdown"	Skepta	3:08
9.	"Shut Up"	Stormzy	2:45
10.	"3 Wheel-Ups"	Kano featuring Wiley & Giggs	4:38
11.	"Panda"	Desiigner	3:46
12.	"Alarm"	Anne-Marie	3:26
13.	"Hotter than Hell"	Dua Lipa	3:09
14.	"Find Me"	Sigma featuring Birdy	3:25
15.	"Perfect Illusion"	Lady Gaga	3:01
16.	"Hands to Myself"	Selena Gomez	3:21
17.	"Breathing Underwater"	Emeli Sandé	4:21
18.	"Rise"	Katy Perry	3:21
19.	"Take Me Home"	Jess Glynne	3:31
20.	"Dancing on My Own"	Calum Scott	4:19
21.	"Love Yourself"	Justin Bieber	3:53

==== CD 3 ====
No.	Title	Artist(s)	Length
1.	"Wolves"	Rag'n'Bone Man	2:56
2.	"Tilted"	Christine and the Queens	3:53
3.	"September Song"	JP Cooper	3:40
4.	"I Hate U, I Love U"	Gnash featuring Olivia O'Brien	3:47
5.	"The Sound"	The 1975	4:09
6.	"Good Grief"	Bastille	3:27
7.	"Charlemagne"	Blossoms	2:46
8.	"7"	Catfish and the Bottlemen	4:17
9.	"Lazarus"	David Bowie	4:04
10.	"Re-Arrange"	Biffy Clyro	3:37
11.	"Waste a Moment"	Kings of Leon	3:03
12.	"Daydreaming"	Radiohead	6:25
13.	"Love & Hate"	Michael Kiwanuka	3:34
14.	"Here"	Alessia Cara	3:17
15.	"Green & Gold"	Lianne La Havas	3:31
16.	"Who Do You Think Of?"	M.O	3:44
17.	"All Night"	The Vamps & Matoma	3:15
18.	"We Don't Talk Anymore"	Charlie Puth featuring Selena Gomez	3:37
19.	"Keep Singing"	Rick Astley	3:30
20.	"You Don't Know Love"	Olly Murs	3:18
21.	"Party Like a Russian"	Robbie Williams	3:02

=== Weekly charts ===
Chart (2017)	Peak position
UK Compilation Albums	1
Irish Compilation Albums	9
