= Ain't Giving Up =

Single by Craig David featuring Sigala

from the album Following My Intuition and Brighter Days
- Released: 19 August 2016
- Genre: EDM; tropical house
- Length: 2:38
- Label: Insanity; Speakerbox; Sony
- Songwriters: Craig David; Bruce Fielder
- Producers: Sigala; Wez Clarke

Craig David singles chronology
"No Holding Back" (2016)	"Ain't Giving Up" (2016)	"Change My Love" (2016)

Sigala singles chronology
"Don't Need No Money" (2016)	"Ain't Giving Up" (2016)	"Only One" (2016)

Music video
- "Ain't Giving Up" on YouTube

"Ain't Giving Up" is a song by British singer Craig David and British DJ Sigala. It is the fifth single from Sigala's debut album, Brighter Days, and the fourth single from David's sixth studio album, Following My Intuition. It was released as a digital download on 19 August 2016 by Insanity Records, Speakerbox Media and Sony Music. David announced it on his official Facebook account along with the release of the album.

== Background ==
"Ain't Giving Up" was announced as the fourth single from Following My Intuition, following "When the Bassline Drops", "Nothing Like This" with Blonde and "One More Time". The single debuted at number 29 on the UK Singles Chart, giving David his twentieth top 40 hit.

== Personnel ==
- Wez Clarke – producer
- Craig David – lead vocals, writer
- Bruce "Sigala" Fielder – producer, writer

== Charts ==
Weekly chart performance for "Ain't Giving Up"
Chart (2016)	Peak position
Belgium (Ultratip Bubbling Under Flanders)	17
Belgium (Ultratip Bubbling Under Wallonia)	50
Czech Republic Airplay (ČNS IFPI)	86
Hungary (Rádiós Top 40)	17
Ireland (IRMA)	57
Japan Hot 100 (Billboard)	60
Netherlands (Dutch Top 40 Tipparade)	14
Scottish Singles Sales (Official Charts)	9
Spain (Promusicae)	36
UK Singles (Official Charts)	23
UK Dance (Official Charts)	12

== Certifications ==
Certifications for "Ain't Giving Up"
Region	Certification	Certified units/sales
United Kingdom (BPI)	Gold	400,000^{‡}
^{‡} Sales+streaming figures based on certification alone.

== Release history ==
Release history and formats for "Ain't Giving Up"
Region	Date	Format(s)	Label(s)
United Kingdom	19 August 2016	CD; digital download	Insanity; Speakerbox; Sony
