= I Love the Night =

I Love the Night may refer to:

- "I Love the Night", a song on Blue Öyster Cult's 1977 album Spectres
- "I Love the Night", a song on Joe Cocker's 1984 album Civilized Man
- "The Ecstasy of Flight (I Love the Night)", a song on Chris de Burgh's 1984 album Man on the Line

== See also ==
- "Love the Night", a stage piece by American playwright and actor Richard Vetere
- "I Love the Nightlife", a 1978 song by Alicia Bridges
- "Live the Night", a 2016 single by W&W and Hardwell
