= Get Loose =

Get Loose may refer to:

- Get Loose (album), or the title song, by Evelyn "Champagne" King (1982)
- "Get Loose" (Lil Jon song) (2015)
- "Get Loose", a song by The D4 from 6twenty (2002)
- "Get Loose", a song by Prince from Crystal Ball (1998)
- "Get Loose", a song by The Salads from Fold A to B (2003)
- "Get Loose", a song by Showtek and Noisecontrollers (2013)
- Get Loose Tour, a 2007 concert tour by Nelly Furtado
