= Following My Intuition =

Studio album by Craig David
- Released: 30 September 2016
- Recorded: 2014–2016
- Genre: R&B; UK garage; EDM
- Length: 49:07
- Label: Insanity; Sony
- Producer: Tre Jean-Marie; Kaytranada; White N3rd; TMS; Sigala; Blonde; Hitimpulse; Hardwell; Wez Clarke; Dave Tozer; Chris Connors; Ambrose Henri; Jack Ü; Richard Adlam; Hal Ritson; Andre Williams; Alan Sampson; MYKL; Anthony Marshall

Craig David chronology
Signed Sealed Delivered (2010)	Following My Intuition (2016)	Rewind – The Collection (2017)

Singles from Following My Intuition
- 1. "When the Bassline Drops" Released: 27 November 2015; 2. "Nothing Like This" Released: 18 March 2016; 3. "One More Time" Released: 20 May 2016; 4. "No Holding Back" Released: 19 August 2016; 5. "Ain't Giving Up" Released: 19 August 2016; 6. "Change My Love" Released: 21 October 2016; 7. "All We Needed" Released: 11 November 2016

Following My Intuition is the sixth studio album by English singer Craig David. The album was released on 30 September 2016 by Insanity Records and Sony Music and features the likes of Big Narstie, Blonde, Sigala, Hardwell and Kaytranada.

It debuted at number one on the UK Albums Chart, giving David his first number-one album since his debut, Born to Do It, reached the top spot in 2000.

== Background ==
The concept for the album began in 2014, when David previewed a teaser track titled "Cold" on his official SoundCloud page. Premiering it on his TS5 radio show the week before, he wanted to preview some of the new music he has been working on in anticipation of his long-awaited sixth studio album, which was to be officially titled or have a release date announced. A further teaser track titled "Seduction" was uploaded to the same SoundCloud page in September 2014.

On 5 September 2015, David featured on BBC Radio 1's Live Lounge with Sigala where they covered Wiz Khalifa and Charlie Puth's "See You Again" mixed with the Little Mix track "Black Magic". The following week, on 10 September, David appeared on Kurupt FM's 'Sixty Minute Takeover' on BBC Radio 1Xtra with MistaJam. He performed his debut single "Fill Me In" over Jack Ü's track "Where Are Ü Now" and it became a viral internet hit. Two snippets of potential new album tracks were also played on the night and this 1Xtra appearance led to David making surprise performances of the "Fill Me In" / "Where Are Ü Now" remix at Fabric with Kurupt FM and Alexandra Palace with Major Lazer and Diplo. It was later revealed that the Radio 1Xtra appearance had led to a collaboration between David and Big Narstie, who also featured on the show and the track they recorded, titled "When the Bassline Drops", was played on MistaJam's Radio 1 and Radio 1Xtra show on 7 November 2015, it was later revealed the track was to be released under SpeakerBox/JEM on 27 November 2015. David made a surprise appearance on the final of The X Factor on 13 December 2015, where he performed his breakthrough single "Re-Rewind" during a medley with Reggie 'n' Bollie and Fuse ODG. "When the Bassline Drops" debuted at number 50 in the UK and peaked at number 10 on 5 February 2016, becoming David's highest-charting single since 2007.

On 25 January 2016, it was announced that David had signed a recording contract with Insanity Records (a joint venture between Sony Music UK and Insanity Management) and independent company Speakerbox Media. With this announced, David's revealed album title Following My Intuition was announced. On 19 March 2016, at the second day of the Ultra Music Festival 2016, during the set of the Dutch DJ and record producer Hardwell, he appeared as a featured artist on their new track "No Holding Back". He also managed to appear on Kaytranada's debut studio album 99.9%, on the track "Got It Good", which he also co-wrote. These song were revealed to also appear on David's new album. On 19 August 2016, Craig announced on social networks that his sixth studio album, Following My Intuition, would finally be released on 30 September 2016. On the same day, he released his new single "Ain't Giving Up", a collaboration with Sigala. "Change My Love" was released as the album's fifth single on 21 October 2016.

== Release and promotion ==
The album was announced on 19 August 2016, which also saw the release of promotional single "No Holding Back", which was collaborated with Dutch DJ and record producer Hardwell.

On the week of the album's release, it was confirmed that his "Fill Me In" / "Where Are Ü Now" performance was added on the album, entitled "16", and was released on 27 September 2016, as the second promotional release. It was also confirmed that, along with Jack Ü, the additional mixers and producers for song included Tre Jean-Marie, Richard Adlam, Hal Ritson and Wez Clarke.

"All We Needed" is the Children in Need 2016 single.

== Critical reception ==
Professional ratings
Review scores
Source	Rating
The Arts Desk	2/5 stars
Clash	6/10
Crack	5/10
Evening Standard	3/5 stars
Exclaim!	8/10
The Observer	3/5 stars

Critics generally found Following My Intuition to be a successful, nostalgia-driven comeback. In his review for The Observer, Michael Gragg wrote that the album "wastes no time cementing his new-found relevance, the opening three songs racing through EDM, garage and drum’n’bass, while "16" is an energised mash-up of "Fill Me In" and Jack Ü's "Where Are Ü Now." David's appeal has always been broad, and the collaboration-heavy bangers are augmented by a clutch of honeyed ballads, including highlight "Louder Than Words." It's good to have him back." Exclaim! editor Kyle Mullin found that the album showcased David's continued strength as both a vocalist and selector of production, particularly on upbeat tracks like "One More Time" and "Ain't Giving Up," which he praised for their "irresistible" and "pulse-pounding" qualities. Mullin noted that while the album was not flawless, it largely demonstrated that David's instincts remained "uniquely sharp and on-point."

Andre Paine from The Evening Standard found that the album reflected a successful comeback driven largely by a "nostalgia dividend," with "nothing groundbreaking" in its overall approach. He highlighted David being "on form" on tracks like "One More Time," "Ain't Giving Up," and "When the Bassline Drops," while criticising the ballads as a continued weakness despite occasional moments such as "Don't Go." Similarly, Thomas H. Green from The Arts Desk found that Following My Intuition was largely driven by nostalgia and "undeniable chutzpah," combining "retro 2-step garage tics" with mainstream pop production. He highlighted "When the Bassline Drops" as the strongest track, but criticised the album's uneven songwriting and its "emotional development of a 14-year-old." Clash editor Robin Murray argued that the album was a "bold comeback" shaped by "harmless nostalgia / future currency," but criticised the album's tendency toward "musical ADD" and a lack of deeper substance beneath its energetic surface. Crack critic Felicity Martin argued that Following My Intuition reflected David's successful comeback, driven by "hard graft, positivity" and nostalgia for his UK garage roots. She noted that the album was strongeston tracks like "One More Time" and "What If," while criticising "fairly bland festival fodder" such as "Ain’t Giving Up" and "Don't Go" for lacking depth compared to his earlier garage-influenced sound.

== Chart performance ==
Following My Intuition debuted at number one on the UK Albums Chart on sales of 24,500, giving David his first number-one album since his debut, Born to Do It, in 2000. As of 2022, the album sold 189,308 copies in the United Kingdom.

== Track listing ==
Following My Intuition – Standard version
No.	Title	Writer(s)	Producer(s)	Length
1.	"Ain't Giving Up" (with Sigala)	Craig David; Bruce Fielder	Sigala; Wez Clarke^{[b]}	2:37
2.	"When the Bassline Drops" (with Big Narstie)	David; Scott Wild; Tyrone Lindo	White N3rd	3:05
3.	"Don't Go"	David; Wild; Tre Jean-Marie; Kevin McCord; Sondra Malone	Tre Jean-Marie; Shy FX	3:27
4.	"16"	David; Jordan Ware; Justin Bieber; Karl Brutus; Mark Hill; Jason Boyd; Sonny Moore; Thomas Pentz	Richard Adlam; Hal Ritson^{[a]}; Jean-Marie^{[a]}; Clarke^{[a]}; Jack Ü^{[c]}	3:48
5.	"Couldn't Be Mine"	David; Jean-Marie; Ed Drewett	Jean-Marie	3:01
6.	"One More Time"	David; Wild; Jean-Marie; Jacob Attwooll	White N3rd	3:14
7.	"Change My Love"	David; Tom Barnes; Uzoechi Emenike; Ben Kohn; Peter Kelleher	TMS	3:24
8.	"Nothing Like This" (with Blonde)	David; Adam Englefield; Jacob Manson	Blonde; Hitimpulse^{[b]}	3:02
9.	"Got It Good" (featuring Kaytranada)	David; Jamie Alem; Louis Kevin Celestin; Jean-Marie; Lauren Faith	Kaytranada	3:48
10.	"All We Needed"	David; Rachel Furner	Dave Tozer; Chris Connors^{[a]}	3:37
11.	"Louder Than Words"	David; Michael Hannides; Alan Sampson	Alan Sampson; MYKL^{[a]}; Clarke^{[a]}	4:05
12.	"What If"	David; Jean-Marie; Aaron Williams	Jean-Marie	3:39
13.	"Like a Fan"	David; Anthony Marshall	Marshall	5:07
14.	"Better with You"	David; Barnes; Kelleher; Carla Marie Williams	TMS	3:13
Total length:				49:07

Following My Intuition – Deluxe version
No.	Title	Writer(s)	Producer(s)	Length
15.	"No Holding Back" (featuring Hardwell)	David; Robbert van de Corput	Hardwell	2:44
16.	"Here with Me"	David; Jean-Marie; Ebenezer Fabiyi	Jean-Marie; LongLivThePlug^{[a]}	3:12
17.	"Warm It Up"	David; Tozer; Patrick Thompson; Philip Smart	Tozer; Connors^{[a]}; Ambrose Henri^{[a]}	3:11
18.	"Sink or Swim"	David; Jean-Marie; Lauren Faith; Celestin	Kaytranada; Jean-Marie^{[b]}	3:17
Total length:				61:31

Following My Intuition – HMV exclusive bonus disc acoustic EP
No.	Title	Length
1.	"All We Needed" (acoustic)	3:41
2.	"When the Bassline Drops" (acoustic)	3:25
3.	"One More Time" (acoustic)	3:25
4.	"Ain't Giving Up" (acoustic)	2:55
5.	"16" (acoustic)	3:53
Total length:		17:19

Notes

- The Australian edition does not include "When the Bassline Drops" as the album was issued by Sony Music while the single was released under license to Warner Music Australia in that country.
- ^{^[a]} signifies a co-producer
- ^{^[b]} signifies an additional producer
- ^{^[c]} signifies an original producer/artist

== Personnel ==
Credits adapted from album's liner notes.

- Richard Adlam – keyboards, programming, and backing producer (track 4)
- Michele Balduzzi – drum programming (track 4)
- Tom Barnes – producer (tracks 7, 14), vocal arrangement (track 14), drums (tracks 7, 14), percussion (track 14)
- Dean Barratt – mixing (track 3)
- Big Narstie – vocals (track 2)
- Chris Bishop – vocal engineer (track 7)
- James Boyle – drums, keyboards, piano, SFX, strings, and synth (track 3)
- Tom Burbree Ely – Pro Tools editing (track 13)
- Wez Clarke – mixing and additional programming (tracks 1–3, 4–7, 11, 12, 14, 16)
- Chris Connors – producer, engineer, keyboards, programming, and synthesizer (tracks 10, 17); mixing, string arrangements, and organ (track 10); drum programming and guitar (track 17)
- Craig David – vocals (all tracks)
- Guy Davie – mastering (track 9)
- Adam Englefield – producer, bass, drums, keyboards, percussion, and programming (track 8)
- Lauren Faith – vocals (track 9)
- Chrystal Hall – backing vocals (track 10)
- Hardwell – producer and mixing (track 15)
- Stuart Hawkes – mastering (tracks 1–7, 10–18)
- Ambrose Henri – additional production, programming, synthesizer, keyboards, and drum programming (track 17)
- Hitimpulse – additional production, bass, drums, keyboards, percussion, and programming (track 8)
- Lewis Hopkin – mastering (track 8)
- Andrew Horowitz – piano (track 10)
- Tre Jean-Marie – producer (tracks 5, 12, 16), vocal producer (tracks 3, 4), instrumentation (tracks 5, 12, 16), engineer (tracks 5, 12, 16, 18), mixing (track 18)
- Kaytranada – producer and mixing (tracks 9, 18)
- Pete Kelleher – producer (tracks 7, 14), vocal arrangement (track 14), keyboards (track 7), programming (track 14)
- Sam Klempner – engineer (track 7), vocal engineer (track 14)
- Ben Kohn – producer (tracks 7, 14), vocal arrangement (track 14), guitar (tracks 7, 14)
- Colin Lester – executive producer
- Longlivtheplug – additional programming (track 16)
- Jacob Manson – producer, engineer, mixing, bass, drums, keyboards, percussion, and programming (track 8)
- Anthony Marshall – producer, engineer, backing vocals, bass, drums, keyboards, and programming (track 13)
- James Mullany – backing vocals (track 10)
- MYKL – producer (track 11)
- Marco Pasquariello – engineer and mixing (track 13)
- Daniel Pearce – additional vocals (track 4)
- Mark Ralph – producer, engineer, and mixing (track 8)
- Hal Ritson – keyboards, programming, and backing producer (track 4)
- Alan Sampson – producer (track 11)
- Sigala – producer and engineer (track 1)
- Matthew Sin – assistant engineer (track 10)
- Dave Tozer – producer, engineer, mixing, keyboards, programming, and synthesizer (tracks 10, 17); string arrangements and organ (track 10); drum programming and guitar (track 17)
- White N3rd – producer (tracks 2, 6), engineer (tracks 2, 3, 6)
- Scott Wild – drums and keyboards (tracks 2, 6)
- Andre Williams – producer, drums, keyboards, SFX, and synth (track 3)
- Carla Marie Williams – vocal arrangement (track 14)

== Charts ==
=== Weekly charts ===
Weekly chart performance for Following My Intuition
Chart (2016)	Peak position
Australian Albums (ARIA)	29
Belgian Albums (Ultratop Flanders)	60
Belgian Albums (Ultratop Wallonia)	80
Dutch Albums (Album Top 100)	62
French Albums (SNEP)	124
German Albums (Offizielle Top 100)	85
Italian Albums (FIMI)	70
New Zealand Heatseekers Albums (RMNZ)	5
Scottish Albums (OCC)	12
Spanish Albums (Promusicae)	81
Swiss Albums (Schweizer Hitparade)	43
UK Albums (OCC)	1
UK Dance Albums (OCC)	1

=== Year-end charts ===
Year-end chart performance for Following My Intuition
Chart (2016)	Position
UK Albums (OCC)	61

== Certifications ==
Certifications of Following My Intuition, with sales where available
Region	Certification	Certified units/sales
United Kingdom (BPI)	Gold	189,308

== Tour ==
The Following My Intuition tour was an arena tour across the UK. It was David's first tour in 15 years.

=== Set list ===
1. "Ain't Giving Up"
2. "What's Your Flava?"
3. "Fill Me In"
4. "Louder Than Words"
5. "Change My Love"
6. "Walking Away"
7. "Don't Love You No More (I'm Sorry)"
8. "Warm It Up"
9. "Rise & Fall"
10. "Nothing Like This"
11. "Couldn't Be Mine"
12. "Love Yourself" (Justin Bieber cover) /"Freestyle Rap section"
13. "7 Days"

TS5 DJ set including:

1. "Re-Rewind (The Crowd Say Bo Selecta)"
2. "Covers Melody" including:
3. "Where's Your Love"
4. "No Scrubs" (TLC cover)/"Angels" (The xx cover)
5. "Walking Away" (Live Remix)
6. "Who's That Girl? (Eurythmics cover)
7. "Jump Around" (House of Pain cover)
8. "One Dance" (Drake cover)/"Rendezvous"
9. "Temperature" (Sean Paul cover)
10. "Nothing Like This
