= Kevin Stephens (disambiguation) =

Kevin Stephens is a footballer.

Kevin Stephens may also refer to:

- Kevin Stephens (American football) in 2012 Southern Utah Thunderbirds football team
- Kevin Stephens (athlete) in 1992 Central American and Caribbean Junior Championships in Athletics

== See also ==
- Kevin Stevens (disambiguation)
