= Kevin Stevens (disambiguation) =

Kevin Stevens is an ice hockey player.

Kevin Stevens may also refer to:

- Kevin Stevens (footballer), Australian rules footballer
- Kevin Stevens (rugby league), Australian rugby league footballer
- Kevin Stevens (rugby union), South African rugby union player

== See also ==
- Kevin Stephens (disambiguation)
