= Nothing Like This =

Nothing Like This may refer to:

- Nothing Like This (album), a 2010 album by Rascal Flatts
- "Nothing Like This" (song), a 2016 song by Blonde and Craig David
