= Mixed Signals (disambiguation) =

"Mixed Signals" is a 2017 song by Robbie Williams.

Mixed Signals may also refer to:

- "Mixed Signals" (The Flash), a 2017 TV episode
- "Mixed Signals" (Generator Rex), a 2011 TV episode
- "Mixed Signals", a 2023 song by Skrillex from Don't Get Too Close
- Mixed Signals, a 2018 film by Tracie Laymon

== See also ==
- Mixed-signal integrated circuit
