= Children in Need 2017 =

- Genre: Telethon
- Presented by: Tess Daly; Rochelle Humes; Marvin Humes; Graham Norton; Ade Adepitan; Mel Giedroyc; Matt Edmondson
- Narrated by: Alan Dedicoat
- Country of origin: United Kingdom
- Original language: English

Production
- Production location: BBC Elstree Centre
- Camera setup: Multiple
- Running time: 7:30 pm–3:00am

Original release
- Network: BBC One; BBC One HD; BBC Two; BBC Two HD
- Release: 18 November 2017

Related
- Children in Need 2016; Children in Need 2018

Children in Need 2017 was a campaign held in the United Kingdom to raise money for the charity Children in Need. It was the 38th Children in Need appeal show which was broadcast live on BBC One on the evening of Friday 17 November until the early hours of Saturday 18 November.

Greg James and Russell Kane didn't return for the 2017 telethon, and were replaced by Mel Giedroyc

== Telethon ==
The culmination of Children in Need 2017 was broadcast on BBC One on 17 November from the BBC Elstree Centre. It was the longest Children In Need with the show running seven and half hours finishing at 03:00 making it the longest appeal show.

=== Presenters ===
Show	Date	Timeslots	Presenters	Channel(s)
Children in Need Rocks the 80s	13 November 2017	20:30-22:00	Fearne Cotton; Sara Cox; Roman Kemp (backstage)	BBC One; BBC One HD
The One Show	17 November 2017	19:00-19:30	Alex Jones; Greg James	BBC One; BBC One HD
Main show	17 November 2017	19:30-20:30	Tess Daly; Ade Adepitan	BBC One; BBC One HD
Main show	17 November 2017	20:30-22:00	Graham Norton; Mel Giedroyc	BBC One; BBC One HD
The Weakest Link Celebrity Special for Children in Need	17 November 2017	22:00-22:40	Anne Robinson	BBC Two; BBC Two HD
Main show	17/18 November 2017	22:40-00:30	Marvin Humes; Rochelle Humes; Matt Edmondson	BBC One; BBC One HD
DIY SOS: The Million Pound Build for Children in Need	18 November 2017	00:30-01:30	Nick Knowles	BBC One; BBC One HD
Children in Need Rocks the 80s (repeat)	18 November 2017	01:30-03:00	Fearne Cotton; Sara Cox; Roman Kemp (backstage)	BBC One; BBC One HD

=== Features ===
- Blue Peter does Strictly Come Dancing
- The Weakest Link Children in Need special
- EastEnders does the West End
- Doctor Who, Twice Upon a Time preview
- Countryfile Country & Western medley
- Hume's House Party
- The Children in Need Choir sang Over The Rainbow with a Choir in the main studio linking up live with choirs in 9 other towns across the UK. These were: Manchester, Bristol, Glasgow, Newcastle, Newbury, Belfast, Halifax (West Yorkshire), Cardiff and Nottingham

=== Local Opt-outs ===
The BBC Regions hosted events which provided local coverage of where the money went. These were shown as opt outs from the main telethon 3 times during the first part and finished around 22:00.

The events were held at the following locations:

- BBC East - Essex at The East Anglian Railway Museum
- BBC East Midlands - Nottingham at The Albert Hall
- BBC London - Watford at The Warner Bros. Studio Tour
- BBC North East and Cumbria - Newcastle at The Discovery Museum
- BBC Northern Ireland - Belfast at The Ulster Folk and Transport Museum
- BBC North West - Manchester at The Science and Industry Museum
- BBC Scotland - Glasgow at BBC Pacific Quay
- BBC South - Newbury at Brockhurst and Marlston House School
- BBC South East - Margate at Dreamland
- BBC Wales - Cardiff at The Broadcasting House
- BBC West - Bristol at Aerospace
- BBC West Midlands - Birmingham at The Mailbox
- BBC Yorkshire at Halifax at The Piece Hall
- BBC Yorkshire and Lincolnshire - Hull at Hymers College

=== Totals ===
Time	Amount (£)
20:31	£11,729,538
21:58	£33,698,156
00:43	£50,168,562

== See also ==
- Children In Need
