= Don't Need No Money =

Single by Imani Williams featuring Sigala and Blonde
- Released: 1 July 2016
- Genre: House
- Length: 3:38
- Label: Sony
- Songwriter(s): Imani Williams; Bruce Fielder; Patrizia Helander; Jacob Manson; Hampus Lindvall
- Producer(s): Sigala; Blonde; Tross

Imani Williams singles chronology
"Say You Do" (2016)	"Don't Need No Money" (2016)	"Body To Body" (2017)

Sigala singles chronology
"Give Me Your Love" (2016)	"Don't Need No Money" (2016)	"Ain't Giving Up" (2016)

Blonde singles chronology
"Nothing Like This" (2016)	"Don't Need No Money" (2016)	"Just for One Night" (2017)

"Don't Need No Money" is the debut single of singer Imani Williams (also known mononymously as Imani). It was released on 1 July 2016 through Sony Music Entertainment. It features house DJs and music producers Sigala and Blonde. As well as being Imani's first song as lead artist, the single was the first project involving Sigala and Blonde in collaboration. Imani gained inspiration for the track based on involvement in the 2016 single "Say You Do", upon which Sigala worked alongside drum and bass music producer DJ Fresh.

== Charts ==
Chart performance for "Don't Need No Money"
Chart (2016)	Peak position
Ireland (IRMA)	77
Scotland (OCC)	49
UK Singles (OCC)	67
