= The Big Narstie Show =

British television series

- Genre: Chat show; Grime comedy
- Presented by: Big Narstie
- Starring: Mo Gilligan
- Country of origin: United Kingdom
- Original language: English
- No. of series: 5
- No. of episodes: 33

Production
- Executive producers: Obi Kevin Akudike; Nathan Brown; Ben Wicks
- Production location: Television Centre, London
- Running time: 60 minutes
- Production companies: Expectation Entertainment; Dice Productions Entertainment

Original release
- Network: Channel 4
- Release: 29 June 2018 – 16 December 2022

The Big Narstie Show is a British television chat show, presented by rapper Big Narstie with comedian Mo Gilligan as his sidekick, that debuted on Channel 4 on 29 June 2018. Big Narstie is a rapper from the grime scene and has been cited as one of the original purveyors in the grime comedy genre.

== Production ==
On 2 February 2018, Channel 4 announced that they had commissioned a new "late night, alternative entertainment show" titled The Big Narstie Show.

The Big Narstie Show was produced for Channel 4 by Expectation and Dice Productions Entertainment. The executive producers are Ben Wicks for Expectation and Obi Kevin Akudike and Nathan Brown for Dice Productions Entertainment.

The show received many accolades including Royal Television Society Awards, an Mvisa, a National Reality TV Award, an Edinburgh TV Award and a Bafta.

== Episodes ==
Series	Episodes	Originally released	
Series	Episodes	First released	Last released
1	6	29 June 2018	3 August 2018
2	8	22 February 2019	12 April 2019
3	6	7 February 2020	13 March 2020
4	6	5 November 2021	10 December 2021
5	6	11 November 2022	16 December 2022

=== Series 1 (2018) ===
No. overall	No. in series	Guests	Original release date
1	1	Ed Sheeran, O-T Fagbenle, Sherrie Silver, Keith Lemon and Moelogo	29 June 2018
2	2	Thandiwe Newton, Rylan Clark, Darryl McDaniels, Stevo the Madman and Craig David	6 July 2018
3	3	Richard Ayoade, Victoria Coren Mitchell, Iya Traoré, Not3s and Panjabi MC	13 July 2018
4	4	David Schwimmer, Giggs, Jamie Demetriou, Lady Leshurr and Mr Eazi	20 July 2018
5	5	David Haye, Rachel Parris, Amelia Dimoldenberg, Tamer Hassan and Krept and Konan	27 July 2018
6	6	Jonathan Ross, Katherine Ryan, Iain Stirling, Stefflon Don and KSI	3 August 2018
Christmas Special
7	–	Mel B, Pamela Anderson, Kurupt FM and Michael Dapaah, Jonathan Ross and David Mitchell	21 December 2018

=== Series 2 (2019) ===
No. overall	No. in series	Guests	Original release date
8	1	Dennis Rodman, Daisy May Cooper, Stephen Dorff, Tan France and Ghetts	22 February 2019
9	2	John Bishop, Adil Ray, Judi Love, Anthony Yarde and IAMDDB	1 March 2019
10	3	Rob Delaney, Emily Atack, Clarke Peters, Lily Allen and Giggs	8 March 2019
11	4	Johnny Vegas, Nicola Adams, Yxng Bane, Richard Blackwood and the cast of Timewasters	15 March 2019
12	5	Jimmy Carr, Maya Jama, David Mitchell and NSG	22 March 2019
13	6	Zawe Ashton, Sue Perkins, Matt Lucas, Rickie Haywood-Williams, Melvin Odoom and Ms. Banks	29 March 2019
14	7	Stephen Fry, Ian Wright, Guz Khan, Tim Westwood, Little Simz and Tory Lanez	5 April 2019
15	8	Rio Ferdinand, Lorraine Kelly, London Hughes and Unknown T	12 April 2019

=== Series 3 (2020) ===
No. overall	No. in series	Guests	Original release date
16	1	Gemma Collins, Vinnie Jones and Guz Khan	7 February 2020
17	2	Little Mix, Joel Dommett, Samson Kayo and M Huncho	14 February 2020
18	3	Charlotte Church, Dynamo, Judi Love and D-Block Europe	21 February 2020
19	4	Louis Theroux, Kano, Sara Pascoe, and Stevo the Madman	28 February 2020
20	5	Nile Rodgers, Fred Sirieix, Riz Ahmed, Ray BLK and Lolly Adefope	6 March 2020
21	6	Jonathan Ross, Tinie Tempah, Asim Chaudhry, Benjamin Zephaniah and Desiree Burch	13 March 2020

=== Series 4 (2021) ===
No. overall	No. in series	Guests	Original release date
22	1	Katherine Ryan, Ne-Yo, Idris Elba and Will Poulter	5 November 2021
23	2	Big Zuu, Harry Redknapp, Patrice Evra and Raye	12 November 2021
24	3	Lenny Henry, Mo Farah, Leomie Anderson and Tion Wayne	19 November 2021
25	4	Dawn Butler, Fatman Scoop, Digga D, Lily Cole and Paul Chowdhry	26 November 2021
26	5	Natalie Cassidy, Judi Love, Michael Page, Shaun Ryder and ArrDee	3 December 2021
27	6	Robert Rinder, Munya Chawawa, Zeze Millz, Yinka Bokinni, Papoose and Ozwald Boateng	10 December 2021

=== Series 5 (2022) ===
No. overall	No. in series	Guests	Original release date
28	1	Bez, Keith Lemon, Oti Mabuse and Ross Kemp	11 November 2022
29	2	Paul Mescal, Aisling Bea, Nella Rose and Stephen Graham	18 November 2022
30	3	Joel Dommett, Denise van Outen, Adebayo Akinfenwa and Brenda Edwards	25 November 2022
31	4	Mel B, Nabil Abdulrashid, Jordan Stephens and Mark “Billy” Billingham	2 December 2022
32	5	Carol Vorderman, Eddie Hearn, Kojey Radical and Scarlett Moffatt	9 December 2022
33	6	Steven Bartlett, Headie One, Jada Kingdom, Thanyia Moore and Mr Blobby	16 December 2022
