= Blonde (duo) =

English deep house band

- Origin: Bristol, England, United Kingdom
- Genres: Deep house
- Years active: 2012–2019
- Labels: FFRR; Parlophone; Eton Messy
- Members: Jacob Manson; Adam Englefield

Blonde were an English deep house production duo from Bristol, consisting of Jacob Manson and Adam Englefield. The group were signed to Parlophone.

== Musical career ==
Blonde premiered the track "It's You" via Englefield's dance music YouTube channel Eton Messy in July 2013. In May 2014, Blonde released their debut single "Foolish", which features vocals from Ryan Ashley. In July 2014, they released their second single "Higher Ground", which features vocals from Charli Taft. They came to prominence in the UK after BBC Radio 1 playlisted their single "I Loved You", which the station named their track of the day in October 2014 and was heavily praised by Radio 1 DJ Greg James on his dance anthems programme. "I Loved You", which features reggae and pop singer Melissa Steel, and received favourable coverage in Clash and Heat magazines. The song entered the UK Singles Chart at number seven and the Scottish Singles Chart at number ten.

Blonde released a fourth single, "All Cried Out", featuring vocals from Glee actor Alex Newell; it reached number four in the UK. The duo's fifth single, "Feel Good (It's Alright)", features Karen Harding.

When it came into 2016, they collaborated with returning record producer and star to the music industry Craig David on the song "Nothing Like This". It was part of David's collaborative period which included artists such as Big Narstie, Katy B and Kaytranada and is also a single off of his sixth studio album, entitled Following My Intuition.

Blonde also featured as well as co-written Imani Williams's debut single, entitled "Don't Need No Money", alongside rising house record producer and DJ Sigala. Together, they took part in first ever major featured project as independent musicians. Imani got the inspiration of the track after she exploded into the music industry with Sigala on his 2016 single "Say You Do", alongside drum and bass music producer DJ Fresh.

They also co-wrote the Rudimental and Ed Sheeran song "Lay It All on Me" with Johnny Harris and James Newman. The song was originally conceived in a session between Blonde, Harris and Newman before being pitched to Rudimental. Ed Sheeran was later brought in on the track and re-wrote the break of the song.

== Discography ==
=== Singles ===
==== As lead artist ====
Title	Year	Peak chart positions								Certifications	Album
Title	Year	UK	UK Dance	AUT	BEL (FL)	GER	IRE	SCO	SWI	Certifications	Album
"Foolish" (featuring Ryan Ashley)	2014	—	—	—	82	—	—	—	—		Non-album singles
"Higher Ground" (featuring Charli Taft)	2014	—	—	—	—	—	—	—	—		Non-album singles
"I Loved You" (featuring Melissa Steel)	2014	7	5	60	31	25	65	10	56	BPI: Platinum	Non-album singles
"All Cried Out" (featuring Alex Newell)	2015	4	1	—	59	—	74	4	—	BPI: 2× Platinum	Non-album singles
"Feel Good (It's Alright)" (featuring Karen Harding)	2015	76	19	—	99	—	—	50	—		Non-album singles
"Nothing Like This" (with Craig David)	2016	15	5	—	94	—	34	10	—	BPI: Platinum	Following My Intuition
"Just for One Night" (featuring Astrid S)	2017	—	—	—	—	—	—	—	—		Non-album singles
"Me, Myself & I" (featuring Bryn Christopher)	2018	—	—	—	—	—	—	—	—		Non-album singles
"Good Life" (with Elderbrook)	2023	—	—	—	—	—	—	—	—		Non-album singles
"—" denotes a single that did not chart or was not released.

==== Under the "Eton Messy" label ====
Title	Year	Album
"Talk To You"	2012	Non-album singles
"Be Mine"	2013	Non-album singles
"It's You"	2013	Non-album singles
"Cast A Spell" (with Pianoman)	2015	Non-album singles

==== As featured artist ====
Title	Year	Peak chart positions										Certifications	Album
Title	Year	UK	AUS	AUT	IRE	ITA	NLD	NZ	SCO	SWE	SWI	Certifications	Album
"Don't Need No Money" (Imani Williams featuring Sigala and Blonde)	2016	67	—	—	77	—	—	—	49	—	—		Non-album single
"—" denotes single that did not chart or was not released in that territory.

== Songwriting and production credits ==
Title	Year	Artist(s)	Album	Contributed Member(s)	Credits	Written with	Produced with
"Real"	2015	Brayton Bowman	The Update EP	Jacob Manson	Co-writer/Producer	Brayton Bowman, Uzoechi Emenike, Ryan Campbell	MNEK
"Lay It All on Me" (featuring Ed Sheeran)	2015	Rudimental	We the Generation	Jacob Manson, Adam Englefield	Co-writer	Amir Izadkhah, Piers Aggett, Kesi Dryden, James Newman, Edward Sheeran, Gavin Slate, Leon "DJ Locksmith" Rolle, Lasse Petersen, Maxwell McElligott, Jonathan Harris, James Luke Wood	-
"Don't Need No Money" (featuring Sigala & Blonde)	2016	Imani Williams	Non-album single	Jacob Manson	Featured artist/Co-writer/Producer	Imani Williams, Bruce Fielder, Patrizia Helander, Hampus Lindvall	Sigala, TROSS
"Don't Ask"	2017	Matt Terry	Trouble	Jacob Manson	Co-writer	Matthew Terry, Duck Blackwell, Andrew Jackson	-
"Somebody Like Me" (featuring AJ Tracey)	2018	Craig David	The Time is Now	Jacob Manson	Co-writer/Producer	Craig David, Che Grant	-
"Answerphone" (with Ella Eyre featuring Yxng Bane)	2018	Banx & Ranx	Non-album single	Jacob Manson	Co-writer	Zacharie Raymond, Yannick Rastogi, Ella McMahon, Shakka Philip, Guystone Menga	-
"Used to Love You"	2018	Anne-Marie	Speak Your Mind	Jacob Manson	Producer	-	Fraser T Smith, LostBoy, Jennifer Decilveo
"Hooked"	2018	Why Don't We	8 Letters	Jacob Manson	Co-writer/Producer	Philip Plested	-
"Just My Type"	2018	The Vamps	Night & Day (Day Edition)	Jacob Manson	Co-writer/Producer	Connor Ball, Tristan Evans, James McVey, Bradford Simpson, Alexander James, Iain Farquharson, James Abrahart, Philip Plested, Tobias Tripp, Dale Anthoni	-
"Talk Later"	2018	The Vamps	Night & Day (Day Edition)	Jacob Manson	Co-writer/Producer	Connor Ball, Tristan Evans, James McVey, Bradford Simpson, Richard Boardman, Pablo Bowman, Sarah Blanchard	Bradford Simpson
"Loyal"	2018	Paloma Faith	The Architect: Zeitgeist; Edition	Jacob Manson	Co-writer/Producer	Paloma Faith, Jamie Miller, Max Wolfgang	Chris Loco
"Getaway"	2018	Syn Cole	Non-album single	Jacob Manson	Co-writer	Rene Pais, Nicholas Gale, Gina Kushka, Edward Drewett	-
"Lotta Love"	2019	Jack & Jack	A Good Friend Is Nice	Jacob Manson	Co-writer/Producer	Andrew Jackson, Adam Argyle	Jussifer
"I Don't Belong in This Club" (with Macklemore)	2019	Why Don't We	TBA	Jacob Manson	Co-writer/Producer	Zak Zilesnick, Maxwell Wolfgang, Benjamin Haggerty	-
"The Road"	2019	Leo Kalyan	Non-album single	Jacob Manson	Co-writer/Producer	Kashif Siddiqui, Uzoechi Emenike	Leo Kalyan
"Brixton"	2019	Jelani Blackman	Non-album single	Jacob Manson	Co-writer/Producer	Jelani Blackman	-
"Too Hot"	2019	Jason Derulo	Non-album single	Jacob Manson	Co-writer/Producer	Jason Desrouleaux	-
"Long Way to Go"	2019	Four of Diamonds	Non-album single	Jacob Manson	Co-writer/Producer	Amy Allen, Scott Friedman	-
"F It Up"	2019	Jason Derulo	2Sides (Side 1)	Jacob Manson	Co-writer/Producer	Jason Desreuloux, Johnny Mitchell, Rosina Russell	-
"Talk About Us" (featuring Stefflon Don)	2019	Jason Derulo	2Sides (Side 1)	Jacob Manson	Co-writer/Producer	Jason Desreuloux, Johnny Mitchell, Rosina Russell, Stephanie Allen	-
"Modern Anxiety"	2019	Josef Salvat	TBA	Jacob Manson	Producer	-	Josef Salvat, Rich Cooper, Banx & Ranx
"Alone"	2019	Josef Salvat	TBA	Jacob Manson	Producer	-	Josef Salvat, Rich Cooper
"Houdini" (featuring Swarmz and Tion Wayne)	2020	KSI	Dissimulation	Jacob Manson	Co-writer/Producer	Olajide Olatunji, Brandon Scott, Dennis Odunwo, Emmanuel Isong, AJ	AJ
