= One More Time (Craig David song) =

Single by Craig David

from the album Following My Intuition
- Released: 20 May 2016
- Genre: UK Garage
- Length: 3:14
- Label: Insanity; Speakerbox; Sony
- Songwriters: Craig David; Tre Jean-Marie; Scott Wild; Jacob Attwooll
- Producer: White N3rd

Craig David singles chronology
| "Nothing Like This" (2016) | "One More Time" (2016) | "No Holding Back" (2016) |

Music video
- "One More Time" on YouTube

"One More Time" is a song by British singer Craig David. It was released as a digital download on 20 May 2016 as the third single from his sixth studio album, Following My Intuition. This is the third single for his comeback, after "When the Bassline Drops" and "Nothing Like This", which received acclaim from critics.

== Chart performance ==
The song peaked number 30 on the UK Singles Chart on 27 May 2016; it remained in the top 100 for 10 weeks before dropping out.

== Music video ==
A music video for the song was released through David's official Facebook account on 27 May 2016 and features him as a DJ, with amount of friends dancing around his turntable throughout the song.

== Track listing ==
Digital download
| No. | Title | Length |
|---|---|---|
| 1. | "One More Time" | 3:14 |

== Charts ==
Weekly chart performance for "One More Time"
| Chart (2016) | Peak position |
|---|---|
| Ireland (IRMA) | 92 |
| Scotland Singles (OCC) | 31 |
| UK Singles (OCC) | 30 |
| UK Dance (OCC) | 12 |

== Release history ==
Release history and formats for "One More Time"
| Region | Date | Format(s) | Label(s) |
|---|---|---|---|
| United Kingdom | 20 May 2016 | CD; digital download | Insanity; Speakerbox; Sony |
