= Me, Myself & I (Blonde song) =

Single by Blonde featuring Bryn Christopher
- Released: 6 July 2018
- Genre: House
- Length: 3:01
- Label: Parlophone; FFRR
- Songwriter(s): Bryn Christopher; Jacob Manson; Dan Goudie; Adam Englefield; Ash Milton
- Producer(s): Blonde; Laconic

Blonde singles chronology
"Just for One Night" (2017)	"Me, Myself & I" (2018)

Bryn Christopher singles chronology
"Sweet Lovin'" (2015)	"Me, Myself & I" (2018)	"All Around the World" (2019)

"Me, Myself & I" is a 2018 song by English duo Blonde featuring English singer Bryn Christopher, released on 6 July 2018.

== Critical reception ==
Mike Wass of Idolator called the song a "banger" and a "thumping house collaboration with Bryn Christopher", and said that along with their previous single "Just for One Night", it is Blonde's catchiest song. Wass finished his review by recommending it thus: "If you're feeling wronged, feisty or just celebrating your independence, this is the tune for you!" Writing for Paper, Michael Love Michael judged the track to be "hi-fi pop gloss that does indeed promote self-love and empowerment, complete with a belted high-fructose chorus". Lewis Corner of Gay Times agreed that the track is a "banger", also naming it a "stomping new anthem" and "a euphoric house banger ready to dominate the summer".

== Music video ==
The music video, directed by Jordan Rossi, was released the same day as the song. Paper called it a celebration of individuality on the dancefloor, and a "queer self-love anthem".

== Track listing ==
Digital download
No.	Title	Length
1.	"Me, Myself & I" (featuring Bryn Christopher)	3:01

Remixes single
No.	Title	Length
1.	"Me, Myself & I" (Joe Stone remix)	4:21
2.	"Me, Myself & I" (Friend Within remix)	6:00
3.	"Me, Myself & I" (Vanilla Ace remix)	6:46
