= Just for One Night =

Single by Blonde featuring Astrid S
- Released: 16 June 2017
- Recorded: 2017
- Genre: Pop; house
- Length: 3:46
- Label: Parlophone; FFRR
- Songwriter(s): Jacob Manson; Henrik Meinke; Jeremy Chacon; Rachel Keen
- Producer(s): Jacob Manson; Hitimpulse

Blonde singles chronology
"Don't Need No Money" (2016)	"Just for One Night" (2017)	"Me, Myself & I" (2018)

Astrid S singles chronology
"Vi er perfekt men verden er ikke det" (2017)	"Just for One Night" (2017)

Music video
- "Just for One Night" on YouTube

"Just for One Night" is a song by English duo Blonde, featuring Norwegian singer-songwriter Astrid S. It was released to digital retailers on 16 June 2017, through Parlophone Records and FFRR Records.

== Background ==
"As soon as we had the idea for this song we knew that Astrid would be perfect for it," the duo told Clash magazine. "We had been fans of her music for ages and really wanted to do a record with her! When her vocal takes landed in my inbox from LA I was screaming!"

== Critical reception ==
Robin Murray of Clash magazine said: "'Just For One Night' could dominate the summer, the latest in a series of singles that bridge the gap between the underground and the charts. It's the sort of thing summer was invented for – production bedlam meets that coy vocal, it's a delicious, infectious pop music." Mike Wass of Idolator said: "Norwegian goddess Astrid S lends her icy vocals to Blonde's 'Just for One Night,' creating brittle dance-pop magic." Dance Vici regarded the song as "a smooth and arguably revitalised production that features the soothing vocals of the hugely talented Astrid S" and "embodies a newly stimulated direction in Blonde's sound and further demonstrates the natural evolution and international diversification the boys can produce."

== Track listing ==
Digital download
No.	Title	Length
1.	"Just for One Night" (featuring Astrid S)	3:46

Digital download – Remixes
No.	Title	Length
1.	"Just for One Night" (featuring Astrid S) (George Kwali Remix)	4:50
2.	"Just for One Night" (featuring Astrid S) (Anton Powers Remix)	3:46
3.	"Just for One Night" (featuring Astrid S) (JLV Remix)	3:59

== Release history ==
Region	Date	Format	Version	Label	Ref.
United States	16 June 2017	Digital download	Original	Parlophone; FFRR	
United States	14 July 2017	Digital download	Remixes	Parlophone; FFRR	
