= All We Needed =

Single by Craig David

from the album Following My Intuition
- Released: 11 November 2016
- Length: 3:37
- Label: Sony
- Songwriters: Craig David; Rachel Furner
- Producers: Dave Tozer; Chris Connors

Craig David singles chronology
"Change My Love" (2016)	"All We Needed" (2016)	"Bang Bang" (2016)

Music video
- "All We Needed" on YouTube

"All We Needed" is a song by British singer Craig David. The song was released as a digital download in the United Kingdom on 11 November 2016 by Sony Music. The song features on his sixth studio album, Following My Intuition (2016). "All We Needed" is a piano ballad, and was released as the official single for Children in Need 2016. Peaking at number 42, it was also the lowest-charting Children In Need single for 21 years.

== Background ==
On 11 November 2016, David announced that the song would be the official Children in Need 2016 single.

== Track listing ==
Digital download
No.	Title	Length
1.	"All We Needed"	3:37

== Charts ==
Weekly chart performance for "All We Needed"
Chart (2016)	Peak position
Scotland Singles (OCC)	13
UK Singles (OCC)	42

== Release history ==
Release history and formats for "All We Needed"
Region	Date	Format(s)	Label	Ref.
United Kingdom	11 November 2016	Digital download	Sony	
