= Feel Good (It's Alright) =

Single by Blonde featuring Karen Harding
- Released: 14 August 2015
- Recorded: 2014–15
- Genre: Deep house
- Length: 3:11
- Label: FFRR; Parlophone

Blonde singles chronology
"All Cried Out" (2015)	"Feel Good (It's Alright)" (2015)	"Nothing Like This" (2016)

Karen Harding singles chronology
"New Love" (2015)	"Feel Good (It's Alright)" (2015)	"Open My Eyes" (2016)

"Feel Good (It's Alright)" is a song by the British deep house production duo Blonde with vocals by the English singer Karen Harding. The song was released in the United Kingdom as a digital download on 14 August 2015 through FFRR Records and Parlophone. The song samples the 1992 song "You Make Me Feel Good" by J.K.

== Music video ==
A music video to accompany the release was released on YouTube on 14 August 2015 with a total length of three minutes and seventeen seconds.

== Track listing ==
Digital download
No.	Title	Length
1.	"Feel Good (It's Alright)" (featuring Karen Harding)	3:11

== Charts ==
Chart (2015)	Peak position
UK Dance (OCC)	19
UK Singles (OCC)	76

== Release history ==
Region	Date	Format	Label
United Kingdom	14 August 2015	Digital download	FFRR; Parlophone
