= Kevin Stephens =

English footballer (born 1984)

Stevo the Madman
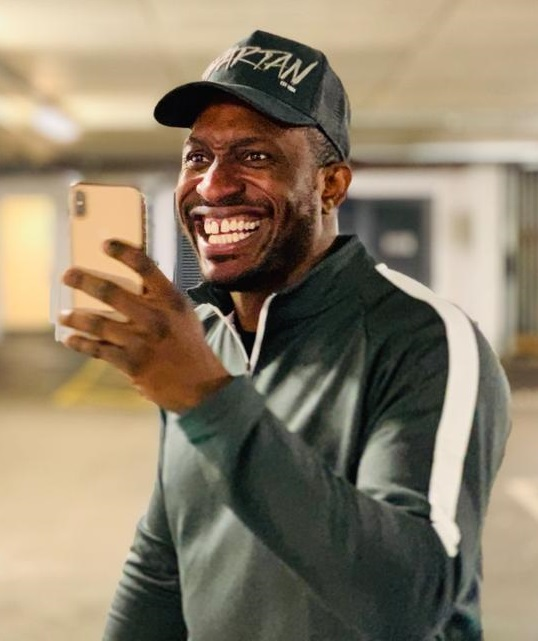
- Stephens in 2019

Personal information
- Full name: Kevin Alexander Stephens
- Date of birth: 28 July 1984 (age 42)
- Place of birth: Enfield, England
- Position: Defender

Youth career
- Queens Park Rangers

Senior career*
Years	Team	Apps	(Gls)
2001–2004	Leyton Orient	4	(0)
2003	→ Billericay Town (loan)	4	(0)
2003–2004	→ Hornchurch (loan)	3	(0)
2004–2005	Redbridge	10	(0)
2005–2007	Enfield Town	27	(1)
2006	→ Chelmsford City (loan)	4	(0)
2007–2008	Redbridge	10	(0)
2008	Newport County	9	(0)
2008	Enfield Town	0	(0)
2008–2009	Boreham Wood	6	(0)
2009	Newport County	9	(0)
2009	Boreham Wood	18	(0)
Total		104	(1)
- * Club domestic league appearances and goals

Kevin Alexander Stephens (born 28 July 1984), known professionally as Stevo the Madman, is an English internet personality and former professional footballer who played as a defender. He played for Leyton Orient in the English Football League. In 2009, Stephens refused to play for Newport County again after opposition striker, Stuart Douglas, received racist abuse from Newport fans in the stadium.

He has since embarked on a career as an internet personality, under the name "Stevo the Madman". After gaining attention for his comedy videos on Snapchat, he has since made appearances on various television shows.

== Career ==
=== Leyton Orient ===
Stephens started his footballing career at Football League Third Division side Leyton Orient as a trainee in 2001. He made his first of four league appearances for the club, all of them away from home, in a 3–2 defeat away to York City on 9 November 2002, a game in which he received a booking. His second appearance was on 18 March 2003 in a 3–1 defeat at A.F.C. Bournemouth, in which he was substituted in the 89th minute for Gabriel Zakuani. His final appearance in the 2002–03 season was in a 1–0 defeat at Southend United on 22 March 2003, coming on as a substitute in the 65th minute for Simon Downer.

His final league appearance for the club would be in the 2003–04 season when he came on as an 82nd minute substitute for Matt Joseph in a 1–1 draw at Mansfield Town on 16 August 2003. Stephens was then loaned out for one month to Billericay Town in the Isthmian League Premier Division, after impressing in a pre-season friendly between Orient and Billericay.

He went on to play for Redbridge, Enfield Town, Chelmsford City, and Boreham Wood.

=== Newport County ===
Stephens was one of three defenders manager Dean Holdsworth brought with him from Isthmian League Division One North club Redbridge to Conference South side Newport County at the start of the 2008-09 season, along with left-back David Collins and centre-back Nick Skelton. In his first two months at the club, he was regarded as their most consistent and impressive outfield player. However, just three months after signing, all three former Redbridge players were released by Newport County. Holdsworth wanted to keep Stephens, but the board decided that paying his travel expenses from his home in London would not be feasible.

Stephens was re-signed by the club later in the same season. He left the club in March 2009 after vowing to never play for them again after hearing racist chants from his own fans directed at Bath City striker Stuart Douglas in Newport's 4–0 loss at home to Bath.

== Career statistics ==
Appearances and goals by club, season and competition
Club	Season	League			FA Cup		Other		Total	
Club	Season	Division	Apps	Goals	Apps	Goals	Apps	Goals	Apps	Goals
Leyton Orient	2001–02	Third Division	0	0	0	0	0	0	0	0
Leyton Orient	2002–03	Third Division	3	0	0	0	0	0	3	0
Leyton Orient	2003–04	Third Division	1	0	0	0	0	0	1	0
Leyton Orient	Total		4	0	0	0	0	0	4	0
Billericay Town (loan)	2003–04	Isthmian League Premier Division								
Hornchurch F.C. (loan)	2003–04	Isthmian League Premier Division	3	0	0	0	2	0	5	0
Redbridge F.C.	2005–06	Isthmian League Premier Division	10	0	0	0	0	0	10	0
Enfield Town	2006–07	Isthmian League Division One North	17	0	0	0	2 (Note: One appearance in Isthmian League Cup, one appearance in Isthmian League Division One North play-offs)	0	19	0
Enfield Town	2007–08	Isthmian League Division One North	10	1	2	0	2 (Note: One appearance in FA Trophy, one appearance in Isthmian League Cup)	0	14	1
Enfield Town	Total		27	1	2	0	4	0	33	1
Chelmsford City (loan)	2006–07	Isthmian League Premier Division	4	0	0	0	0	0	4	0
Redbridge F.C.	2007–08	Isthmian League Division One North	10	0	—		2 (Note: Appearance(s) in Isthmian League Division One North play-offs)	0	12	0
Newport County	2008–09	Conference South	18	0	—		1 (Note: Appearance(s) in Conference League Cup)	0	19	0
Boreham Wood	2008–09	Isthmian League Premier Division	12	0	0	0	0	0	12	0
Boreham Wood	2009–10	Isthmian League Premier Division	12	0	2	0	2 (Note: Appearance(s) in FA Trophy)	0	16	0
Boreham Wood	Total		24	0	2	0	2	0	28	0
Career Total			100	1	4	0	11	0	115	1

== Media career ==
While working as a recovery driver, Stephens constantly filmed his day-to-day life as a 'van man' which saw the inception of 'StevoTheMadMan'. Stephens has been featured on numerous TV shows. Between 2016 and 2020, he was a regular host of a YouTube series for JD Sports called Take a Bow. The show saw its hosts discuss the latest football news, matches and gossip on a weekly basis.

In January 2019, Stephens, coupled with music artist Big Narstie finished 3rd in the fourth series of Celebrity Coach Trip.

During December 2019, Stephens also starred in the Come Dine with Me Christmas special in a bid to win £1,000 for charity over a week of competitive cooking and hosting. Also in December 2019, Stephens appeared on comedy, music and talk show The Big Narstie Show with friend Big Narstie and comedian Mo Gilligan where they discussed his content and upcoming projects.

He covered the 2020 Super Bowl for BBC Sport on the opening night - interviewing the players, teams and coaches ahead of the game.

In June 2021, Stephens was a featured artist on the song Come On England by Plain Old Kev. The music video for the song has cameos from former England international footballers Rio Ferdinand, Peter Crouch and Sol Campbell, as well as music artists Example, Olly Murs, Joel Corry and Danny Howard. The song peaked at #78 on the British iTunes Chart.

In February 2022, it was announced that Stephens would be part of the cast of E4 cooking show Celebrity Cooking School.

== Other ventures ==
In the early 2000s, Stephens was a record producer under the stage name Stevo and was affiliated with the grime production crew The Beatcamp, whose other members included P Jam, "Pow! (Forward)" producer Dexplicit, and Skilz. He was signed non-exclusively to Dice Recordings, who are best known for their work with Big Narstie as well as the release of Skepta's instrumental EP DTI and Jme and D Double E's collaboration "Serious Thugs".

== Filmography ==
Film
Year	Title	Role	Notes
2019	Are We Dead Yet	Ghost	

Television
Year	Title	Role	Notes
2018	Football's 47 Best Worst Songs	Self - Social Media Celebrity	https://www.imdb.com/title/tt8469562/?ref_=nm_flmg_slf_3
2019	The Premier League Show	Self - Reporter	Season 3, Episode 16 - Behind the Scenes at Leicester
2019	Celebrity Coach Trip	Self - Contestant	Placed 3rd
2019	Come Dine with Me	Self - Contestant	Celebrity Christmas Special Episode
2018 - 2020	The Big Narstie Show	Self - Guest	Season 1, Episode 2 - Season 2, Episode 8 - Season 3, Episode 4
2022	Celebrity Cooking Show	Self - Contestant	
