= No Holding Back (song) =

Single by Hardwell featuring Craig David

from the album Following My Intuition
- Released: 19 August 2016
- Genre: UK garage
- Length: 2:44
- Label: Revealed; Insanity; Sony
- Songwriter(s): Robbert van de Corput; Craig David
- Producer(s): Hardwell

Hardwell singles chronology
"Live the Night" (2016)	"No Holding Back" (2016)	"Thinking About You" (2016)

Craig David singles chronology
"One More Time" (2016)	"No Holding Back" (2016)	"Ain't Giving Up" (2016)

Music video
- "No Holding Back" on YouTube

"No Holding Back" is a song by Dutch DJ and record producer Hardwell, featuring British singer Craig David. The song was expected to be the first single from Hardwell's upcoming second studio album (never released) and it featured on David's sixth studio album, Following My Intuition. It was released as a digital download on 19 August 2016 by Insanity Records, Speakerbox Media and Sony Music.

== Background ==
On 19 March 2016, at the second day of Ultra Music Festival 2016, during the set of the Dutch DJ and record producer Hardwell, David appeared as a featured artist on their new track "No Holding Back". On 19 August 2016, exactly five months later, both artists announced on their own social media that it will be their next single following the performance. The single was announced along with David's release date of his new album as well as his latest single, "Ain't Giving Up". The track contains two of David's third verses of the performance.

== Music video ==
The music video for the song was released the same day it was announced, following the thirty-seconds snippet preview on Hardwell and David's official Facebook account. The music video features the performance of the duo at the Ultra Music Festival, with the images of Hardwell and David around Miami Beach time before the performance, similar with David's last single, "One More Time".

== Track listing ==
Digital download
No.	Title	Length
1.	"No Holding Back"	2:44

iTunes download
No.	Title	Length
2.	"No Holding Back (Henry Fong Remix)"	3:50

== Credits ==
- Production, arrangement – Hardwell
- Vocals – Craig David
- Lyrics – Robbert van de Corput
- Label: Sony

== Release history ==
Release history and formats for "No Holding Back"
Region	Date	Format(s)	Label(s)
United States	19 August 2016	CD; digital download	Insanity; Speakerbox; Sony
