= NAHLI =

- Born: Essex, England
- Genres: Pop
- Label: Rebel Records

Nahli, (professionally known and stylised as NAHLI), is a British singer and songwriter who has worked with DaVinChe. Her moniker is her birth name combined with her dad's stage name (Natalie and Harley).

== Early life ==
NAHLI grew up in England with both parents being professional singers. She was exposed her to a wide variety music such as Boney M, Abba, Elvis, Michael Jackson and Enya. Writing a diary since the age of 5 helped her realise how she can transfer her thoughts from paper into song form. From age three she took ballet lessons and attended Italia Conti on a half scholarship.

NAHLI has expressed that she felt very split between two families and like she didn't fit anywhere and was a burden. Her parents divorced when she was young and both her mum and dad had a children with a new partners. Her friend Simon, died when NAHLI was 15 and her life began to crumble. At age 16 she worked at Tesco to afford a trip to the Maldives.

== Career ==
NAHLI has been working with DaVinChe for close to a decade and thinks of him as a big brother, mentor and friend. They met when she was scouted to be in one of his projects and she says she hounded him to work closer with her.

NAHLI has featured on tracks such as Professor Green’s ‘Bad Decisions’, Rude Kid's ‘Please Don’t’, Crystal Fighters ‘Costa Rica’ and Conducta's ‘Only U’. She toured across Europe with SIGMA where they played concerts to over 50,000 people.

In 2019, NAHLI released her debut solo EP named 'Therapy (Side A). The cover art was designed by Aymi and portrays NAHLI with a distorted throat. She stated that she hadn't spoken to her father for a few years and her ex fiancé ended things, so she penned tracks to express her feelings on the EP aimed at them.

In 2021, NAHLI released the singles "Catch 22", featuring Big Narstie and "Something's Gotta Change".

I hope people will see the things I have to offer as not only a music artist, but a painter too. I just have a deep desire to create. I’d like people to see me as someone with kindness and with the willingness to listen and help anybody where I can. I give a lot to music.

== Personal life ==
NAHLI thinks of the moon as God and regularly speaks with it and adorns herself with images of it.

Human rights, especially topics of women's empowerment are important to NAHLI and she regularly discusses them in interviews and her music.

NAHLI began painting when she broke her leg and her housemate, who was an artist, encouraged her to give it a go. She often posts pieces to her social media platforms. She has painted portraits of Kurt Cobain and Dennis Rodman (which Carmen Electra gave a like to).

She resides in East London but hails from Essex.
