= Signed Sealed Delivered (album) =

Studio album by Craig David
- Released: 29 March 2010
- Length: 43:37
- Label: Universal Motown
- Producers: Jerry Abbott; Grant Black

Craig David chronology
Greatest Hits (2008)	Signed Sealed Delivered (2010)	Following My Intuition (2016)

Singles from Signed Sealed Delivered
- 1. "One More Lie (Standing in the Shadows)" Released: 22 March 2010; 2. "All Alone Tonight (Stop, Look, Listen)" Released: 31 May 2010

Signed Sealed Delivered is the fifth studio album by English singer Craig David. It was released on 29 March 2010 as his only album with Universal Motown. Produced by Jerry Abbott and Grant Black, the record primarily consists of cover versions, with two tracks sampling and reinterpreting Motown-era songs in a contemporary style, including "One More Lie (Standing in the Shadows)" and "All Alone Tonight (Stop, Look, Listen)." It concludes with the only original song, "This Could Be Love."

The album was generally poorly received by critics, who described it as a derivative, overproduced covers album with limited originality, though a small number acknowledged some contemporary reinterpretation of classic soul songs. Despite the criticism, Signed Sealed Delivered achieved moderate international chart success, reaching the UK top 20 and charting across Europe and Australia, with generally mid-to-lower placements elsewhere. In promotion of the album, two singles were released, including lead single "One More Lie (Standing in the Shadows)," which reached the UK Singles Chart.

== Background and composition ==
In 2008, Craig David released his first compilation album Greatest Hits on Warner Bros. Records and Sire Records. His final release with the labels, the album originally peaked at number 48 on the UK Albums Chart and eventually received a Silver certification from the British Phonographic Industry (BPI) for sales and streaming figures of 60,000 units. Following his departure from Warner, David found himself in a period of uncertainty, with relatively few commercially attractive offers emerging. During this time, he was approached by Universal and offered the opportunity to record a cover album of Motown classics.

Rather than adopting a rigid concept, David initially envisioned a collection of updated reinterpretations of songs he personally admired. As the project progressed, it naturally developed a stronger Motown identity, influenced in part by his renewed listening to the music of Michael Jackson after the singer's 2009 death, which led him back to the records that had shaped his own musical upbringing. Featuring reinterpretations of songs by artists such as The Temptations, Stevie Wonder, Otis Redding, and Marvin Gaye, alongside unexpected choices like Curtis Stigers' "I Wonder Why." David described the project as more about reinterpreting songs he loved and challenging himself vocally than following a strict concept.

== Critical reception ==
Professional ratings
Aggregate scores
Source	Rating
AnyDecentMusic?	2.9/10
Review scores
Source	Rating
AllMusic	3.5/5 stars
The Guardian	3/5 stars
Sputnikmusic	1.5/5 stars
Sydney Morning Herald	1/5 stars
The Times	1/5 stars
Virgin Media	1/5 stars

Critical reception for Signed Sealed Delivered was largely negative. One of the few favourable reviews came from Carolinne Sullivan of The Guardian, who noted that David faithfully recreated the original performances, reproducing "every falsetto and hiccup." However, she questioned the purpose of such a straightforward approach, describing the album as a "karaoke record" and suggesting that David would be better served by rediscovering his strengths as an R&B songwriter rather than relying on covers. AllMusic editor Mark Deming rated the album three and a half stars out of five and highlighted how David was reinterpreting songs such as "Just My Imagination," "Papa Was a Rolling Stone," and "(Sittin’ On) The Dock of the Bay" while bringing his own contemporary style to them.

Writing for The Sydney Morning Herald, Annabel Ross viewed Signed Sealed Delivered as evidence of David's artistic decline, criticizing its "uninspired interpretations" of familiar soul and Motown songs and its dependence on sampled material. She concluded that the record was "a depressing reminder of a once-brilliant pop star’s complete irrelevance." Simon Price of The Independent similarly dismissed the album as a predictable and unnecessary collection of covers, criticizing its "gloopy karaoke production" and arguing that David's "very ordinary voice" offered little improvement on the celebrated original recordings. Hugh Montgomery from The Observer described Signed Sealed Delivered as a redundant and misguided collection of soul covers, criticizing its reliance on familiar standards given an "over-produced karaoke treatment." He was particularly dismissive of the album's attempts at reinvention and concluded that the record was "unfathomably redundant stuff." Writing for The Times, Pete Paphideswas equally critical, portraying the album as a formulaic and commercially motivated collection of covers. He described David's performances as "an unremarkable karaoke turn" marked by "mere canine eagerness" and argued that, despite the strength of the source material, the album was defined by "arrant impudence" and weakened further by the "thunderously crap" closing track, "This Could Be Love."

== Commercial performance ==
Signed Sealed Delivered achieved moderate chart success in several international markets following its release in 2010. In the United Kingdom, the album peaked at number 13 on the UK Albums Chart, becoming David's fifth consecutive top 20 album, and reached number two on the UK R&B Albums Chart, marking its strongest chart performance. By January 2016, it had sold 33,779 copies in the United Kingdom.

The album also performed well in Spain and Greece, where it reached numbers 14 and 21, respectively. In Australia, the album peaked at number 24 on the ARIA Albums Chart. Elsewhere in Europe, it reached number 38 on the Ultratop Flanders chart in Belgium, number 48 on the Scottish Albums Chart, and number 76 on both the Ultratop Wallonia chart and the Italian Albums Chart. The album also entered the charts in the Netherlands and Switzerland, peaking at number 93 in both countries.

== Track listing ==
Signed Sealed Delivered track listing
No.	Title	Writer(s)	Length
1.	"One More Lie (Standing in the Shadows)"	Craig David; Jerry Abbott; Grant Black; Shridhar Solanki; Brian Holland; Lamont Dozier; Edward Holland, Jr.	3:04
2.	"Signed, Sealed, Delivered (I'm Yours)"	Stevie Wonder; Lee Garrett; Syreeta Wright; Lula Mae Hardaway	3:20
3.	"All Alone Tonight (Stop, Look, Listen)"	David; Abbott; Black; Thom Bell; Linda Creed	3:29
4.	"I Heard It Through the Grapevine"	Norman Whitfield; Barrett Strong	3:37
5.	"Just My Imagination"	Whitfield; Strong	4:03
6.	"For Once in My Life"	Ron Miller; Orlando Murden	3:34
7.	"(Sittin' On) The Dock of the Bay"	Otis Redding; Steve Cropper	3:23
8.	"Mercy Mercy Me"	Marvin Gaye	3:34
9.	"I Wonder Why"	Glen Ballard; Curtis Stigers	4:19
10.	"Papa Was a Rollin' Stone"	Whitfield; Strong	3:58
11.	"Let's Stay Together"	Al Green; Al Jackson, Jr.; Willie Mitchell	3:36
12.	"This Could Be Love"	David; Abbott; Black; Colin Lester	3:24
Total length:			43:37

Japanese edition bonus tracks
No.	Title	Writer(s)	Length
13.	"Fill Me In" (acoustic version)	David; Mark Hill	4:34
14.	"I Wonder Why" (acoustic version)	Ballard; Stigers	4:45
15.	"One More Lie (Standing in the Shadows)" (acoustic version)	David; Abbott; Black; Solanki; Holland; Dozier; Edward Holland, Jr.	2:56
Total length:			55:52

== Personnel ==
Credits adapted from album's liner notes.

- Jerry Abbott – producer, engineer, guitar, bass, keyboards (all tracks), programming (tracks 1–5, 7–12), handclaps (tracks 2–5, 7, 8, 10–12)
- Grant Black – producer (tracks 1–5, 7–12), handclaps (tracks 2–8, 10–12)
- Erkan Cetin – handclaps (tracks 2–8, 10–12)
- Craig David – vocals (all tracks)
- Benjamin Edwards – harmonica (track 6)
- LaDonna Harley-Peters – backing vocals (tracks 2, 4, 6, 8, 9, 12)
- Sharlene Hector – backing vocals (tracks 2, 4, 6, 8, 9, 12)
- Wayne Hernandez – backing vocals (tracks 10, 11)
- Bob Ludwig – mastering (all tracks)
- Ali Tennant – backing vocals (tracks 6, 9)
- Gay-Yee Westerhoff – whistle (track 7)
- Jeremy Wheatley – mixing (all tracks)

== Charts ==
Chart performance for Signed Sealed Delivered
Chart (2010)	Peak position
Australian Albums (ARIA)	24
Belgian Albums (Ultratop Flanders)	38
Belgian Albums (Ultratop Wallonia)	76
Dutch Albums (Album Top 100)	93
Greek Albums (IFPI)	21
Italian Albums (FIMI)	76
Scottish Albums (Official Charts)	48
Spanish Albums (Promusicae)	14
Swiss Albums (Schweizer Hitparade)	93
UK Albums (Official Charts)	13
UK R&B Albums (Official Charts)	2
