= Get Loose (Lil Jon song) =

Single by Lil Jon
- Released: October 2, 2015
- Recorded: 2015
- Genre: Electro hop
- Length: 2:00
- Label: Dim Mak
- Songwriters: Jonathan Smith; David Macias; Juan Salinas; Oscar Salinas

Lil Jon singles chronology
"My Cutie Pie" (2015)	"Get Loose" (2015)	"Live the Night" (2016)

"Get Loose" is a song by American rapper Lil Jon. It was released as a single on October 2, 2015 through Dim Mak Records. The song rose to prominence after being featured in a 2015 Bud Light commercial.

== Charts ==
=== Weekly charts ===
Chart (2015)	Peak position
US Dance/Electronic Digital Songs (Billboard)	46
