= Live the Night =

Single by W&W and Hardwell featuring Lil Jon
- Released: 11 July 2016
- Genre: Big room house
- Length: 2:13
- Label: Mainstage Music
- Songwriter(s): Willem van Hanegem; Wardt van der Harst; Robbert van de Corput; Jonathan Smith
- Producer(s): W&W; Hardwell

W&W singles chronology
"Arcade" (2016)	"Live the Night" (2016)	"Caribbean Rave" (2016)

Hardwell singles chronology
"Run Wild" (2016)	"Live the Night" (2016)	"No Holding Back" (2016)

Lil Jon singles chronology
"Get Loose" (2016)	"Live the Night" (2016)	"Take It Off" (2016)

"Live the Night" is a song by Dutch DJs W&W and Hardwell, featuring American rapper Lil Jon.

== Background ==
The song was performed at Ultra Music Festival by Hardwell in 2014. W&W performed the first draft of this song at the Ministry of Sound Festival in 2013. It was originally dubbed "Let's Rage". As a reason for the long time between first playing and release they mention that they haven't been satisfied with the instrumental track. Already in 2015 Hardwell debuted a first potentially final version of the track, titled "We Got This". It contained vocals by British singer and DJ Harrison Shaw, but was cancelled as well.

The version that features Lil Jon was first played at "Revealed Miami Edition" at Nikki Beach Miami on March 16, 2016. At that point of time it was still unclear on whose label the track will be released and which producer will be named first on the single.

== Track listing ==
No.	Title	Length
1.	"Live the Night"	2:13
2.	"Live the Night" (Extended Mix)	4:33

== Charts ==
Chart (2016)	Peak position
Belgium (Ultratip Bubbling Under Wallonia)	42
France (SNEP)	112
