= Children in Need 2016 =

- Genre: Telethon
- Presented by: Tess Daly; Greg James; Graham Norton; Ade Adepitan; Rochelle Humes; Marvin Humes; Russell Kane
- Narrated by: Alan Dedicoat
- Country of origin: United Kingdom
- Original language: English

Production
- Production location: BBC Elstree Centre
- Camera setup: Multiple
- Running time: 7:30 pm–1:00 am

Original release
- Network: BBC One; BBC One HD; BBC Two; BBC Two HD
- Release: 20 November 2016

Related
- Children in Need 2015; Children in Need 2017

Children in Need 2016 is a campaign held in the United Kingdom to raise money for the charity Children in Need. It was the 37th Children in Need appeal show which was broadcast live on BBC One on the evening of Friday 18 November until the early hours of Saturday 19 November. It was the first edition of the televised campaign since original presenter Terry Wogan's death in January 2016.

Dermot O'Leary, Fearne Cotton and Nick Grimshaw did not return for the 2016 telethon, and were replaced by Graham Norton, Ade Adepitan and Marvin Humes. Craig David performed the official Children in Need single for 2016, All We Needed.

== Telethon ==
The culmination of Children in Need 2016 was broadcast on BBC One on 18 November from the BBC Elstree Centre.

This year saw the biggest totaliser record in the history of Children in Need, £46.6 million. It was announced in summer 2017 that the charity raised the highest ever fundraising total of £60,000,000.

=== Presenters ===
The presenters were:

Show	Date	Timeslots	Presenters	Channel(s)
Children in Need Rocks for Terry	14 November 2016	20:30-22:00	Greg James; Fearne Cotton	BBC One; BBC One HD
The One Show	18 November 2016	19:00-19:30	Alex Jones; Matt Baker; Patrick Kielty	BBC One; BBC One HD
Main show	18 November 2016	19:30-20:45	Tess Daly; Greg James	BBC One; BBC One HD
Main show	18 November 2016	20:45-22:00	Graham Norton; Ade Adepitan	BBC One; BBC One HD
Main show	18 November 2016	22:00-22:40	Marvin Humes; Rochelle Humes	BBC Two; BBC Two HD
Main show	18/19 November 2016	22:40-01:00	Marvin Humes; Rochelle Humes; Russell Kane	BBC One; BBC One HD
Children in Need – The Best Bits (Highlights show)	20 November 2016	14:00-15:10	Ade Adepitan	BBC Two; BBC Two HD

=== Music ===
Singer/ Band/ Group	Song
Craig David	"All We Needed"
Little Mix	"Shout Out to My Ex"
Cast of Motown: The Musical	"Motown Medley"
Zara Larsson	"Ain't My Fault"
Aladdin: The Musical	"Arabian Nights", "A Whole New World" and "Friend Like Me"
Busted	"Year 3000" and "Thinking of You"
Cast of Half A Sixpence	"Flash, Bang, Wallop"
Dean John-Wilson	"Proud of Your Boy"
Children In Need Choir	"Lean On Me"

=== Features ===
- Fantastic Beasts Children In Need Special - with Eddie Redmayne
- Would I Lie To You? Children In Need Special
- Cast of EastEnders go 80's
- Team GB does Strictly Come Dancing

=== Local Opt-outs ===
- BBC East - Milton Keynes at Stadium MK
- BBC East Midlands - Leicester at The Curve Theatre
- BBC London - London at BBC Maida Vale Studios
- BBC North East and Cumbria - Prudhoe at Prudhoe Castle
- BBC Northern Ireland - Belfast at Titanic
- BBC North West - Liverpool at Sefton Park
- BBC Scotland - Glasgow at BBC Pacific Quay
- BBC South - Salisbury at Salisbury Arts Centre
- BBC South East - Bexhill at The De La Warr Pavilion
- BBC South West - Plymouth at The Royal William Yard
- BBC Wales - Swansea at Swansea University
- BBC West - Bristol at The Mall at Cribbs Causeway
- BBC West Midlands - Dudley at the Black Country Living Museum
- BBC Yorkshire - Bradford at Bradford College
- BBC Yorkshire and Lincolnshire - Bridlington at Bridlington Spa

As well as the main studio in Elstree the events at Liverpool, Swansea, Bridlington, Dudley, Glasgow, Milton Keynes, Salisbury and Belfast each hosted a choir of around 150 children to sing Lean on Me in unison as part of the Children in Need Choir.

=== Totals ===
The following are totals with the times they were announced on the televised show.

Date	Time	Total
18 November 2016	20:42	£15,605,308
18 November 2016	21:59	£29,519,665
18 November 2016	23:59	£42,396,715
19 November 2016	01:00	£46,624,259

== See also ==
- Children In Need
