= Love My Life (song) =

2016 single by Robbie Williams

Single by Robbie Williams

from the album The Heavy Entertainment Show
- Released: 20 November 2016
- Genre: Pop; pop rock
- Length: 3:28
- Label: Columbia
- Songwriters: Robert Williams; Johnny McDaid; Gary Go
- Producers: Johnny McDaid; Gary Go; Jonny Coffer

Robbie Williams singles chronology
"Party Like a Russian" (2016)	"Love My Life" (2016)	"Mixed Signals" (2017)

Music video
- "Love My Life" video on YouTube

"Love My Life" is a song by British singer-songwriter Robbie Williams, released as the second single from his eleventh studio album The Heavy Entertainment Show (2016). The single was released in the United Kingdom on 20 November 2016. The song was written by Williams, Johnny McDaid, and Gary Go. It was produced by McDaid with additional production by Go and Jonny Coffer. It topped the charts in Slovakia and Slovenia.

== Background ==
During his appearance on RTL Late Night on 2 November 2016, Williams said that the song was "about positivity and making the most of your life. I have a son called Charlton Valentine and a daughter called Theodora Rose Williams. I have been to rehab twice and had lots of therapy. I realised that what happens to you when you become older is because of you when you were a kid. So this song is about hope and spreading positivity instead of negativity."

== Charts ==
=== Weekly charts ===
Chart (2016–17)	Peak position
Australia (ARIA)	36
Austria (Ö3 Austria Top 40)	9
Belgium (Ultratop 50 Flanders)	46
Belgium (Ultratip Bubbling Under Wallonia)	16
CIS Airplay (TopHit)	184
Czech Republic Airplay (ČNS IFPI)	34
Finland Download (Latauslista)	18
Germany (GfK)	17
Germany (Airplay Chart)	4
Hungary (Rádiós Top 40)	17
Hungary (Single Top 40)	13
Iceland (RÚV)	7
Italy (FIMI)	54
Italy (Musica e dischi)	12
Poland Airplay (ZPAV)	6
Scottish Singles Sales (Official Charts)	3
Slovakia Airplay (ČNS IFPI)	1
Slovakia Singles Digital (ČNS IFPI)	61
Slovenia (SloTop50)	1
Spain (Promusicae)	33
Switzerland (Schweizer Hitparade)	8
UK Singles (Official Charts)	22

=== Year-end charts ===
Chart (2017)	Position
Hungary (Single Top 40)	99
Iceland (Tónlistinn)	40
Poland (ZPAV)	30
Slovenia (SloTop50)	6
Switzerland (Schweizer Hitparade)	88

Chart (2018)	Position
Slovenia (SloTop50)	47

== Certifications ==
Region	Certification	Certified units/sales
Austria (IFPI Austria)	Gold	15,000^{‡}
Denmark (IFPI Danmark)	Gold	45,000^{‡}
Germany (BVMI)	Gold	200,000^{‡}
Italy (FIMI)	Platinum	50,000^{‡}
Switzerland (IFPI Switzerland)	Gold	10,000^{‡}
United Kingdom (BPI)	Gold	400,000^{‡}
^{‡} Sales+streaming figures based on certification alone.
