= Party Like a Russian =

Single by Robbie Williams

from the album The Heavy Entertainment Show
- Released: 30 September 2016
- Recorded: June – July 2015
- Length: 3:02
- Label: Columbia
- Songwriters: Robert Williams; Guy Chambers; Sergei Prokofiev; Chris Heath
- Producers: Guy Chambers; Richard Flack

Robbie Williams singles chronology
"The Days" (2014)	"Party Like a Russian" (2016)	"Love My Life" (2016)

Music video
- "Party Like a Russian" on YouTube

"Party Like a Russian" is a song by British singer-songwriter Robbie Williams, released as the lead single from his eleventh studio album The Heavy Entertainment Show (2016). The single was released in the United Kingdom on 30 September 2016. The song was written by Robbie Williams, Guy Chambers and Chris Heath. The chorus of the song samples Sergei Prokofiev's Montagues and Capulets.

== Background and lyrics ==
An email that surfaced due to the Surkov leaks revealed that Russian businessman Roman Abramovich hired Williams to headline a New Year's dinner for President Putin's inner circle. The party took place in Moscow in 2014 and appears to have been the inspiration for "Party Like a Russian".

The lyrics to the song deal with Russian oligarchs who funnel enormous sums of money overseas, to the detriment of the Russian people, with much of it going to ridiculous yachts and other excesses. Williams starts the song with "It takes a certain kind of man with a certain reputation, to alleviate the cash from a whole entire nation, take my loose change and build my own space station." Later, commenting on his yacht, he sings "It takes half the Western world just to keep the ship afloat".

He also sings, "Ain't no refutin' or disputin' – I'm a modern Rasputin." Williams dismissed speculation that the song was an oblique criticism of Vladimir Putin, writing on Twitter that "this song is definitely not about Mr Putin", and elsewhere observing that "Russians are ridiculously good partiers".

== Music video ==
The music video for the song satirizes the hedonistic parties of the Russian elites. It drew criticism for its portrayal of Russian culture.

== Charts ==
Chart (2016)	Peak position
Austria (Ö3 Austria Top 40)	39
Belgium (Ultratop 50 Flanders)	18
CIS Airplay (TopHit)	181
France (SNEP)	66
Germany (GfK)	72
Hungary (Rádiós Top 40)	12
Hungary (Single Top 40)	30
Italy (FIMI)	42
Italy (Musica e dischi)	9
Scottish Singles Sales (Official Charts)	19
Slovakia Airplay (ČNS IFPI)	38
Switzerland (Schweizer Hitparade)	45
UK Singles (Official Charts)	68
UK Singles Downloads (Official Charts)	23
