= Mixed Signals =

Single by Robbie Williams

from the album The Heavy Entertainment Show
- Released: 28 February 2017
- Genre: Pop rock; soft rock
- Length: 3:58
- Label: Columbia
- Songwriters: Brandon Flowers; Dave Keuning; Mark Stoermer; Ronnie Vannucci Jr.
- Producer: Stuart Price

Robbie Williams singles chronology
"Love My Life" (2016)	"Mixed Signals" (2017)	"Time for Change" (2019)

"Mixed Signals" is a song recorded by English singer Robbie Williams for his eleventh studio album, The Heavy Entertainment Show (2016). It was written by the members of the American band the Killers and was produced by Stuart Price. Influenced by 1980s music, "Mixed Signals" is a pop rock and soft rock song accompanied with synthesizers usually present in tracks from the 2000s. It received generally favourable reviews from music critics, who highlighted the song on the album and compared it to the previous works by the Killers. Robbie's girlfriend is played by Top London Model, Kirsty Rose Heslewood.

An accompanying music video for "Mixed Signals", filmed in Shoreditch, East London and directed by Ross Anderson, was released on 28 February 2017. It features Williams trying to get in touch with his love interest, whilst she is out partying around the city. Two alternative videos, with different endings, featuring the singer's real life wife Ayda Field and English singer Gary Barlow were also released. Williams performed "Mixed Signals" at the 2017 Brit Awards in a medley with "The Heavy Entertainment Show" and "Love My Life".

== Development and production ==
"Mixed Signals" was written by Brandon Flowers, Dave Keuning, Mark Stoermer, and Ronnie Vannucci Jr., collectively known better as The Killers. It was produced by British electronic musician and producer, Stuart Price. Eventually, the band gave the song to Williams and let him record it for his eleventh studio album, The Heavy Entertainment Show (2016).

The singer previewed the song for first time on 14 October 2016, through his official Instagram account. He posted a short snippet of the song and wrote, "Here’s your next taste of #TheHeavyEntertainmentShow – track 3: Mixed Signals. There’ll be a new teaser here on Instagram every day – don’t go anywhere… #MixedSignals." Along with producing it, Price also mixed the song and together with Robert Root engineered it. He also together with Keuning provided the guitars and keyboards alongside Flowers. Stoermer plays the bass guitar on the song, whilst Vannucci Jr. is responsible for the drums. "Mixed Signals" was mastered by Chris Gehringer at Sterling Sound Studios in New York City.

== Composition ==
"Mixed Signals" is a pop rock and soft rock song with a length of three minutes and 58 seconds. It features 1980s music influence accompanied by synthesisers usually present in tracks from the 2000s. Lewis Corner of Digital Spy noted that, it "has that kind of pulsing electric guitar undertone that pushes it towards '80s power-anthem status". Neil Z. Yeung of AllMusic wrote that "Mixed Signals" is an "open-road epic" that sounds like a "Runaways" from the Killers's 2012 studio album, Battle Born.

== Critical and commercial reception ==
Although the album received generally mixed reviews from music critics, "Mixed Signals" was highlighted. Andi Gill of The Independent wrote that The Killers provided the album with "a little chart-oriented rock punch" on "Mixed Signals". Regarding the song, Kitty Empire of The Observer, in her album review wrote, "Strangely enough, he wears this windswept stuff surprisingly well." Corner of Digital Spy called it a "standout" on the album and further wrote, "Robbie has always had that frontman energy in his delivery, so the lovelorn lyric, pumping chorus and growling vocal will go down a storm at his live show." The Guardian's Tim Jonze was more critical and noted that "Mixed Signals" sounds like a "cartoon version" of works done by American singer Bruce Springsteen. Dave Hanratty of Drowned in Sound called the song a "really cheap knock-off" of The Killers's 2006 single, "When You Were Young".

Commercially, it only charted on the Scottish Singles Charts at number 59.

== Music video ==
The accompanying music video for "Mixed Signals" was filmed in early February in Shoreditch, East London. The Evening Standard reported that Williams's former bandmate, singer Gary Barlow, was also spotted on the set. It was directed by Ross Anderson, whilst Matt Frost served as its producer for Nice & Polite production company. Anderson was also an executive producer and Bianca Di Marco acted as a production manager of the video. The direction of photography was provided by Matthew North, whilst Jade Mortimer was the art director. Christian Lyndon edited the clip for Absolute Post which also was a post production company. The video premiered on 28 February 2017 and was subsequently uploaded on Williams's official YouTube channel.

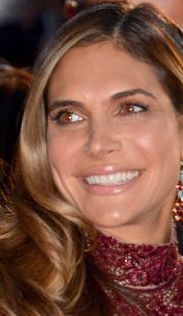
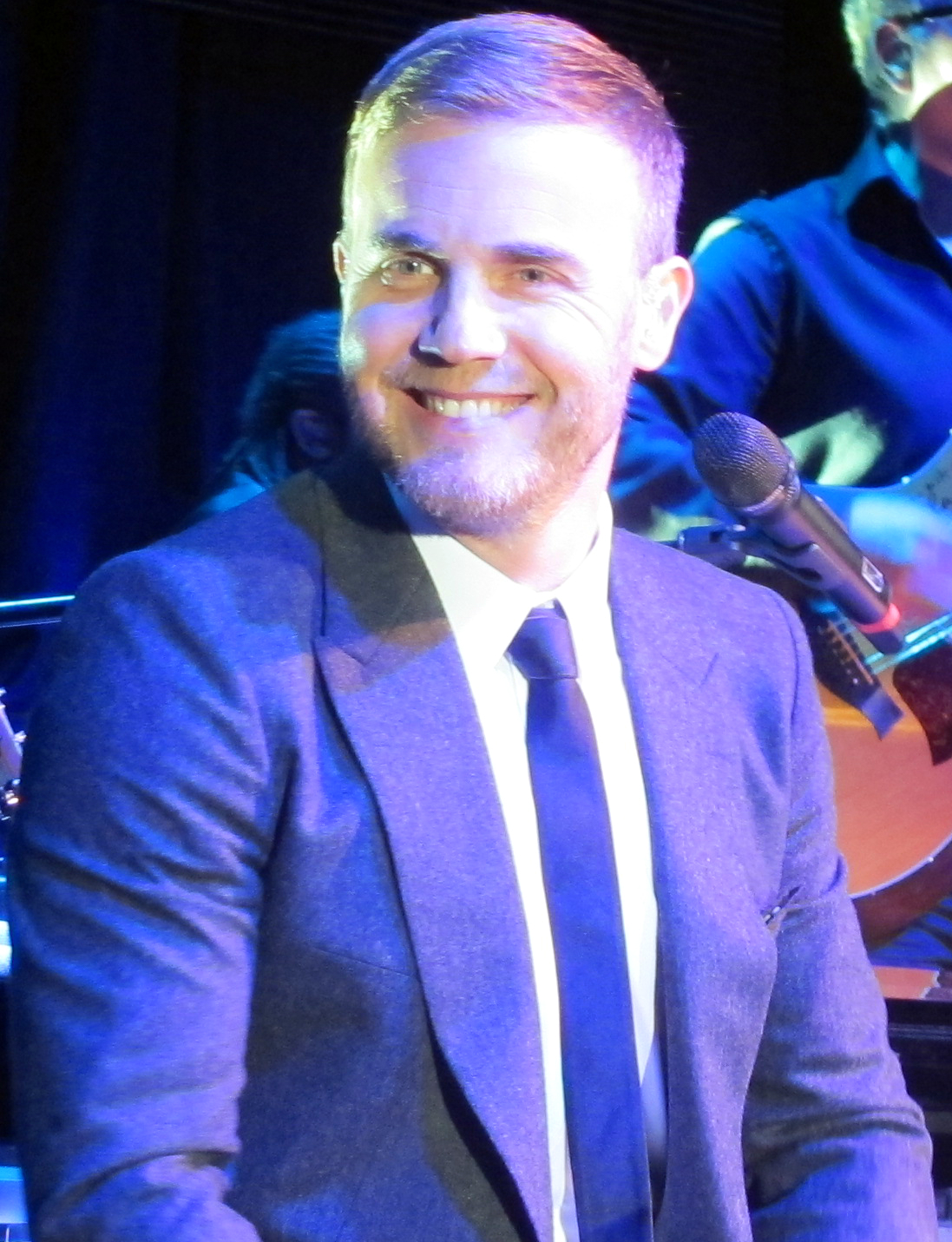
Two alternative endings were released for the video of "Mixed Signals". The first alternative ending features Williams's on-screen girlfriend having affair with his wife Ayda Field (left), while the second features her being in love with his former band mate Gary Barlow (right).

The video begins with Williams's on screen lover, who is played by model Kirsty Rose Heslewood, stepping out of the shower. Whilst in the bathroom, a number rings on her phone, but she declines the call. Scenes are intercut with Williams sitting on a bed and trying to get in touch with her. Shot from Heslewood's perspective, the video sees the model getting ready for a night out and putting on her lingerie, stockings and belt. Whilst she is getting dressed, Williams again tries to get in touch with her by sending several text messages. Once fully dressed, she gets into a taxi and meets two girlfriends. They are shown in a restaurant having dinner and drinking champagne. During the course of their night, they notice a man sitting at the bar. Heslewood approaches him and starts a conversation. Whilst he is distracted ordering a drink for her, she steals his wallet and together with her friends get out of the bar. The man realizes that his wallet is gone and starts chasing them, by which point they enter in a cab. In the cab, they check out his wallet and find a passport photo of him and laugh. They continue with their night out. Near the end of the video, Heslewood gets into a lift and once she is on the floor, she wanders down the corridor and takes away her shoes in front of a door. Finally, she enters the door and comes to Williams. At the very end of the video, he finds the picture of the man.

Two alternative endings of the video were also released. The first one features Heslewood entering the door and coming to a woman, played by Ayda Field, Williams's real life wife. The two of them embrace and kiss as the video ends. Sam Warner of Digital Spy called the ending "a lesbian twist". Being a guest on Loose Women, Field spoke about the video, as she elaborated that it was Williams's idea to include her, "‘He goes, but at the end, there’s this alternate ending and you’re making out with a really hot model. ‘I thought, “Ok, I can work with that”, I was thinking “what’s he going to look like?” and then it was a woman!" The second alternative ending features Heslewood coming home to Barlow. As she enters the room, he is waiting for her with a glass of champagne. They hug and kiss as the video ends and fades to black.

== Live performances ==
Williams performed "Mixed Signals" at the 2017 Brit Awards in a medley with "The Heavy Entertainment Show" and "Love My Life". It was the closing performance of the night. He also sang a short version of the song on the 14th series of Ant & Dec's Saturday Night Takeaway which aired on 4 March 2017.

== Credits and personnel ==
Credits adapted from the liner notes of The Heavy Entertainment Show (Columbia Records).

=== Mastering ===
- Mastered at Sterling Sound Studios in New York City

=== Personnel ===
- Robbie Williams – vocals
- Brandon Flowers – writing, keyboards
- Dave Keuning – writing, guitars
- Mark Stoermer – writing, bass guitar
- Ronnie Vannucci Jr. – writing, drums
- Stuart Price – production, mixing, engineering, guitars, keyboards
- Robert Root – engineering
- Chris Gehringer – mastering

== Charts ==
Chart (2017)	Peak position
Scotland Singles (OCC)	59

== Release history ==
Region	Date	Format	Label(s)	Ref.
Italy	19 May 2017	Contemporary hit radio	Universal	
