= Kevin Stevens (footballer) =

Australian rules footballer (born 1944)

Personal information
- Full name: Kevin Stevens
- Born: 15 February 1944
- Original team: Mildura Imperials
- Height: 193 cm (6 ft 4 in)
- Weight: 86 kg (190 lb)

Playing career^{1}
Years	Club	Games (Goals)
1965–68	Footscray	43 (30)
- ^{1} Playing statistics correct to the end of 1968.

Kevin Stevens (born 15 February 1944) is a former Australian rules footballer who played with Footscray in the Victorian Football League (VFL).
