= The Heavy Entertainment Show =

- Standard cover art. Digital Deluxe features the same, but with turquoise text.

Studio album by Robbie Williams
- Released: 4 November 2016
- Recorded: June 2015 – June 2016
- Genre: Pop
- Length: 40:03
- Label: Columbia
- Producers: Guy Chambers; Jonny Coffer; Richard Flack; Stuart Price; Steve Robson; Greg Kurstin; Johnny McDaid; Gary Go

Robbie Williams chronology
Under the Radar Volume 1 (2014)	The Heavy Entertainment Show (2016)	Under the Radar Volume 2 (2017)

Singles from The Heavy Entertainment Show
- 1. "Party Like a Russian" Released: 30 September 2016; 2. "Love My Life" Released: 20 October 2016; 3. "Mixed Signals" Released: 28 February 2017

The Heavy Entertainment Show is the eleventh studio album by English singer Robbie Williams. It was released on 4 November 2016 through Columbia Records. It features guest appearances from Rufus Wainwright and John Grant. The album was primarily produced by Williams' longtime songwriting partner Guy Chambers and Richard Flack, along with a variety of producers such as Stuart Price, Johnny McDaid and Gary Go.

The Heavy Entertainment Show was supported by three singles: "Party Like a Russian", "Love My Life" and "Mixed Signals", with the second topping the charts in Slovenia and Slovakia and being a top ten hit in five other countries. The album debuted atop the UK albums chart and stayed in the top 10 for three weeks. It also reached the top in 4 other countries. The album was promoted with "The Heavy Entertainment Show Tour", which started on 2 June 2017 in Manchester and ended on 17 November 2018 in Mexico City.

== Background ==
In May 2016, it was announced that Robbie Williams had signed a recording contract with Sony Music. Williams said in a statement: "They're [Sony Music] inspired, I'm inspired. I'm more ready than I ever have been and I'm totally convinced I'm in the right place. I look forward to working on this album, which is an album I'm immensely proud of, in this exciting new partnership with Sony Music."

== Composition ==
Musically, The Heavy Entertainment Show is a pop album with elements of rock, swing, country and electro-pop. The third track "Mixed Signals" was co-written by all four members of the American alternative rock band the Killers, who also perform all instrumentation.

== Release and promotion ==
The album was announced on 25 September 2016, the same day Williams performed at the Apple Music Festival in London. He told the crowd: "Today I announced my new album, it's called "The Heavy Entertainment Show. It's out on the 4th of November and you can pre-order it now. Enjoy", and sang two songs from the album that he had already performed on the "Let Me Entertain You Tour" and the "Swings Both Ways Live" tour, respectively: "Motherfucker" and "Sensational".

On the same day, the album's title track "The Heavy Entertainment Show" was released on Spotify and as an "instant grat" through the iTunes Store.

The album's first official single, "Party Like a Russian", was released on 30 September 2016. The second single, "Love My Life", was released on 20 October 2016.

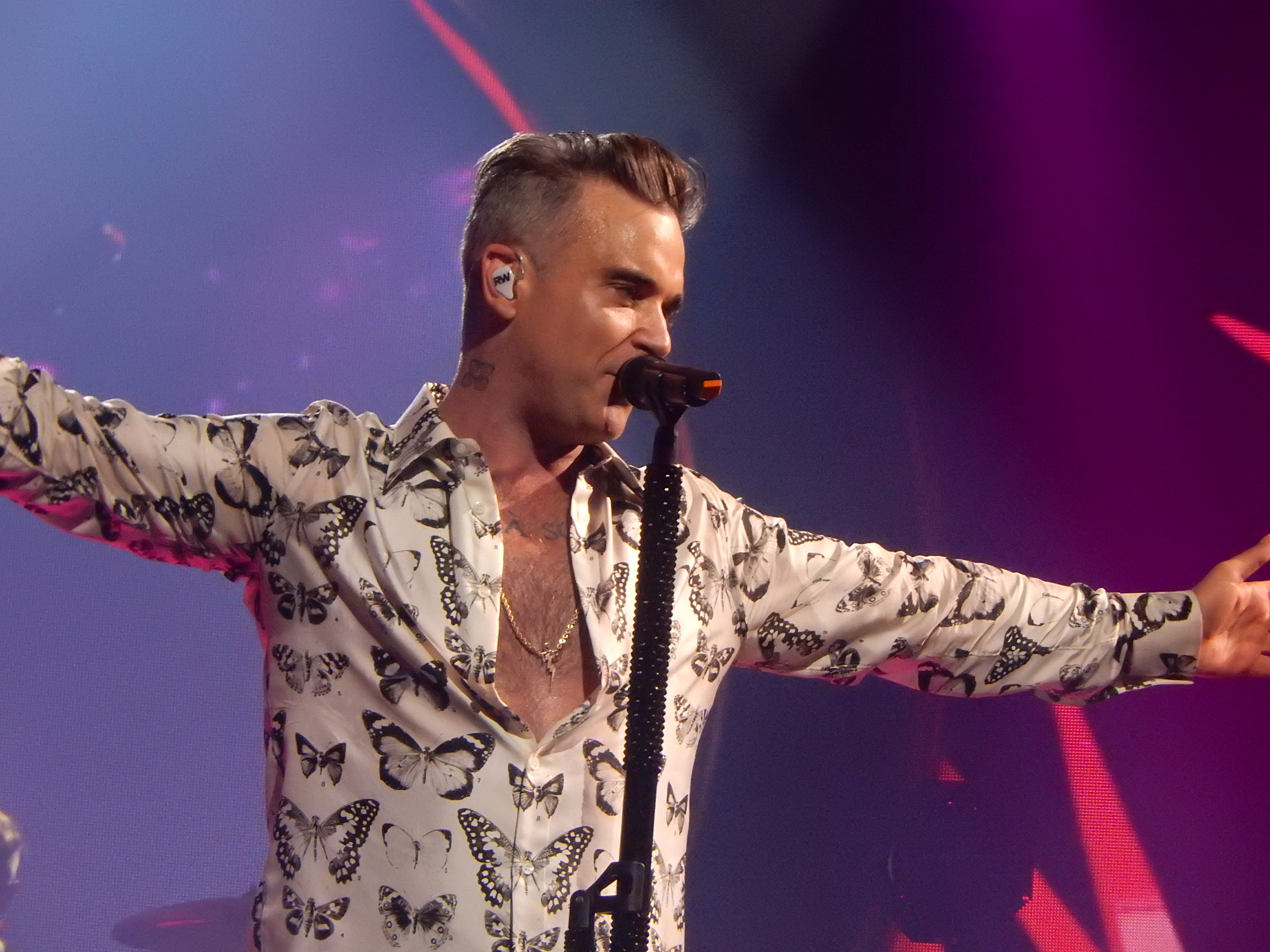
Robbie Williams performing during the Apple Music Festival at the Roundhouse in London, England on September 25, 2016

On 7 November, Williams announced a concert tour titled The Heavy Entertainment Show Tour to promote the album. It began on 2 June 2017 in Manchester, England and ended in November 2018 in Mexico City.

== Critical reception ==
Professional ratings
Aggregate scores
Source	Rating
Metacritic	59/100
Review scores
Source	Rating
AllMusic	4/5 stars
Clash	4/10
Drowned in Sound	3/10
The Guardian	2/5 stars
Evening Standard	4/5 stars
The Observer	3/5 stars
The Independent	2/5 stars
NME	4/5 stars
Q	3/5 stars
The Telegraph	3/5 stars

The Heavy Entertainment Show received a Metacritic score of 59 based on 9 reviews, indicating "mixed or average reviews".

Neil Z. Yeung of AllMusic was highly positive in his 4-star review, saying "Aptly titled, Williams is entertaining as ever, a consummate showman until the end. The album is a grab bag of ideas, darting here and there in its pursuit of a hit. However, this isn't too much of a distraction, Mr Entertainment and his bombast do not disappoint. The Heavy Entertainment Show is his most invigorated album in years, a truer return to the pop realm than Take the Crown. Here, Williams dresses up his antics in expert production with plenty of cheekiness to spare."

Kitty Empire from The Observer gave a mixed three-star review stating, "Cheek, swagger and schmaltz, the tunes that could only come from Williams make this record entertaining, if a little groan worthy. The could-be-anybody songs just don't stick in the memory."

Tim Jonze from The Guardian gave a negative two-star review and said, "A lurching mess of styles, it lurches from one thing to the next, be that MOR balladry, glam rock or orchestral show tunes."

== Commercial performance ==
Two days before the album was released in the Netherlands, Williams received a gold edition of the album during his appearance on RTL Late Night on 2 November 2016 for over 20,000 pre-orders of the album in the country. It debuted at number 1 on the UK album's chart with combined first week sales of 67,000 copies sold.

== Track listing ==
The Heavy Entertainment Show – Standard edition
No.	Title	Writer(s)	Producer(s)	Length
1.	"The Heavy Entertainment Show"	Serge Gainsbourg; Robert Williams; Guy Chambers; Rufus Wainwright; Christopher Heath	Chambers; Richard Flack; Greg Kurstin	3:22
2.	"Party Like a Russian"	Williams; Chambers; Sergei Prokofiev; Heath	Chambers; Flack	3:02
3.	"Mixed Signals"	Brandon Flowers; Dave Keuning; Mark Stoermer; Ronnie Vannucci Jr.	Stuart Price	3:58
4.	"Love My Life"	Williams; Johnny McDaid; Gary Go	McDaid; Go^{[a]}; Jonny Coffer^{[a]}	3:28
5.	"Motherfucker"	Williams; Flynn Francis; Tim Metcalfe; Heath	Chambers; Flack	4:17
6.	"Bruce Lee"	Williams; Price	Price	3:13
7.	"Sensitive"	Williams; Price; Jackson Guthy	Price	3:16
8.	"David's Song"	Williams; Chambers; Kara DioGuardi; Jewel Kilcher	Chambers; Flack	4:14
9.	"Pretty Woman"	Williams; Ed Sheeran; Benjamin Levin; Steve Robson	Robson	2:55
10.	"Hotel Crazy" (featuring Rufus Wainwright)	Williams; Chambers; Wainwright	Chambers; Flack	4:25
11.	"Sensational"	Mike Curb; Mack David; Williams; Chambers; Wainwright; Heath	Chambers; Flack	3:47
Total length:				40:03

The Heavy Entertainment Show – Deluxe edition
No.	Title	Writer(s)	Producer(s)	Length
12.	"When You Know"	Williams; Chambers; Seckou Keita; Jimmy Carr	Chambers; Flack	4:20
13.	"Time on Earth"	Williams; Chambers; Heath	Chambers; Flack	4:51
14.	"I Don't Want to Hurt You" (with John Grant)	John Grant; Williams; Chambers	Chambers; Flack	4:18
15.	"Best Intentions"	Williams; Chambers; Heath	Chambers; Flack	3:44
16.	"Marry Me"	Williams; Karl Brazil; Ben Castle	Chambers; Flack	3:53
Total length:				61:12

Notes

- ^a signifies an additional producer

== Charts ==
=== Weekly charts ===
Chart (2016)	Peak position
Australian Albums (ARIA)	4
Austrian Albums (Ö3 Austria)	3
Belgian Albums (Ultratop Flanders)	3
Belgian Albums (Ultratop Wallonia)	8
Czech Albums (ČNS IFPI)	3
Danish Albums (Hitlisten)	8
Dutch Albums (Album Top 100)	1
Finnish Albums (Suomen virallinen lista)	11
French Albums (SNEP)	19
German Albums (Offizielle Top 100)	2
Hungarian Albums (MAHASZ)	14
Irish Albums (IRMA)	1
Italian Albums (FIMI)	5
Italian Albums (Musica e dischi)	7
New Zealand Albums (RMNZ)	17
Norwegian Albums (VG-lista)	22
Polish Albums (ZPAV)	25
Portuguese Albums (AFP)	18
Scottish Albums (Official Charts)	1
Slovak Albums (ČNS IFPI)	5
South Korean International Albums (Circle)	3
Spanish Albums (Promusicae)	8
Swedish Albums (Sverigetopplistan)	7
Swiss Albums (Schweizer Hitparade)	1
Taiwanese Albums (Five Music)	5
UK Albums (Official Charts)	1

=== Year-end charts ===
Chart (2016)	Position
Australian Albums (ARIA)	61
Austrian Albums (Ö3 Austria)	35
Belgian Albums (Ultratop Flanders)	42
Belgian Albums (Ultratop Wallonia)	113
Dutch Albums (Album Top 100)	34
German Albums (Offizielle Top 100)	29
Italian Albums (FIMI)	60
Swiss Albums (Schweizer Hitparade)	29
UK Albums (OCC)	14

Chart (2017)	Position
Belgian Albums (Ultratop Flanders)	141
Swiss Albums (Schweizer Hitparade)	57

== Certifications ==
Region	Certification	Certified units/sales
Australia (ARIA)	Gold	35,000^{^}
Austria (IFPI Austria)	Gold	7,500^{*}
Germany (BVMI)	Gold	100,000^{‡}
Italy (FIMI)	Gold	25,000^{*}
Netherlands (NVPI)	Gold	20,000^{‡}
Switzerland (IFPI Switzerland)	3× Gold	30,000^{‡}
United Kingdom (BPI)	Platinum	300,000^{‡}
Summaries
Worldwide	—	700,000
^{*} Sales figures based on certification alone.^{^} Shipments figures based on certification alone.^{‡} Sales+streaming figures based on certification alone.
