= When the Bassline Drops =

Single by Craig David and Big Narstie

from the album Following My Intuition
- Released: 27 November 2015
- Recorded: 2015
- Genre: UK garage
- Length: 3:05
- Label: Insanity; Speakerbox
- Songwriters: Craig David; Scott Wild; Tyrone Lindo
- Producer: White N3rd

Craig David singles chronology
"All Alone Tonight (Stop, Look, Listen)" (2010)	"When the Bassline Drops" (2015)	"Who Am I" (2016)

Big Narstie singles chronology
"Hello Hi" (2015)	"When the Bassline Drops" (2015)

Music video
- "When the Bassline Drops" on YouTube

"When the Bassline Drops" is a song by British singer Craig David and British rapper Big Narstie. It was David's first single in six years, it was released on 27 November 2015 by Insanity and Speakerbox Media as the lead single from his sixth studio album, Following My Intuition (2016). The song was written by David, Scott Wild and Tyrone Lindo, and peaked at number ten on the UK Singles Chart.

== Background ==
The song sees David return to his UK garage roots, and is his first single release since "All Alone Tonight (Stop, Look, Listen)" in May 2010. The "Ravers Edition" music video was released on 10 December. The song premiered on MistaJam's show on BBC Radio 1Xtra on 7 November 2015.

== Chart performance ==
The song entered at number fifty on the UK Singles Chart on 4 December 2015 – for the week ending dated 10 December 2015 – before climbing to number ten nine weeks later. This gave David his first top ten hit since "Hot Stuff (Let's Dance)" in 2007.

== Music video ==
A music video to accompany the release of "When the Bassline Drops" was first released onto YouTube on 10 December 2015 at a total length of three minutes and five seconds.

== Live performances ==
David and Big Narstie performed "When the Bassline Drops" on The Jonathan Ross Show on 30 January 2016.

== Track listing ==
Digital download
No.	Title	Length
1.	"When the Bassline Drops"	3:05

== Charts ==
=== Weekly charts ===
Weekly chart performance for "When the Bassline Drops"
Chart (2015–16)	Peak position
Australia (ARIA)	74
Belgium (Ultratip Bubbling Under Flanders)	23
Ireland (IRMA)	61
Scotland Singles (OCC)	27
UK Singles (OCC)	10
UK Dance (OCC)	2

=== Year-end charts ===
Year-end chart performance for "When the Bassline Drops"
Chart (2016)	Position
UK Singles (OCC)	70

== Certifications ==
Certifications for "When the Bassline Drops"
Region	Certification	Certified units/sales
United Kingdom (BPI)	Platinum	600,000^{‡}
^{‡} Sales+streaming figures based on certification alone.

== Release history ==
Release history and formats for "When the Bassline Drops"
Region	Date	Format(s)	Label(s)	Ref.
United Kingdom	27 November 2015	Digital download	Insanity; Speakerbox	
