= Nothing Like This (song) =

Single by Blonde and Craig David

from the album Following My Intuition
- Released: 18 March 2016
- Recorded: 2016
- Genre: Deep house; 2-step garage
- Length: 3:03
- Label: Parlophone; FFRR
- Songwriter(s): Craig David; Adam Englefield; Jacob Manson
- Producer(s): Blonde

Blonde singles chronology
"Feel Good (It's Alright)" (2015)	"Nothing Like This" (2016)	"Don't Need No Money" (2016)

Craig David singles chronology
"Who Am I" (2016)	"Nothing Like This" (2016)	"One More Time" (2016)

Music video
- "Nothing Like This" on YouTube

"Nothing Like This" is a song by English deep house duo Blonde, with English singer Craig David. It serves as the second single from his sixth studio album, Following My Intuition (2016). It received its debut airplay on Capital FM on 17 March 2016 and was released by Parlophone and FFRR Records the following day. The song debuted at number 17 on the UK Singles Chart and peaked at number 15.

== Track listing ==
Digital download
No.	Title	Length
1.	"Nothing Like This"	3:03

== Charts ==
=== Weekly charts ===
Chart (2016)	Peak position
Australia (ARIA)	71
Hungary (Dance Top 40)	11
Hungary (Rádiós Top 40)	12
Ireland (IRMA)	34
Scotland (OCC)	10
Sweden (Sverigetopplistan)	93
UK Dance (OCC)	5
UK Singles Downloads (OCC)	6
UK Singles (OCC)	15

=== Year-end charts ===
Chart (2016)	Position
Hungary (Dance Top 40)	52
Hungary (Rádiós Top 40)	69
UK Singles (OCC)	73

== Certifications ==
Region	Certification	Certified units/sales
United Kingdom (BPI)	Platinum	600,000^{‡}
^{‡} Sales+streaming figures based on certification alone.

== Release history ==
Region	Date	Format	Label
United Kingdom	18 March 2016	Digital download	Parlophone; FFRR
