= Big Narstie =

British entertainer (born 1985)

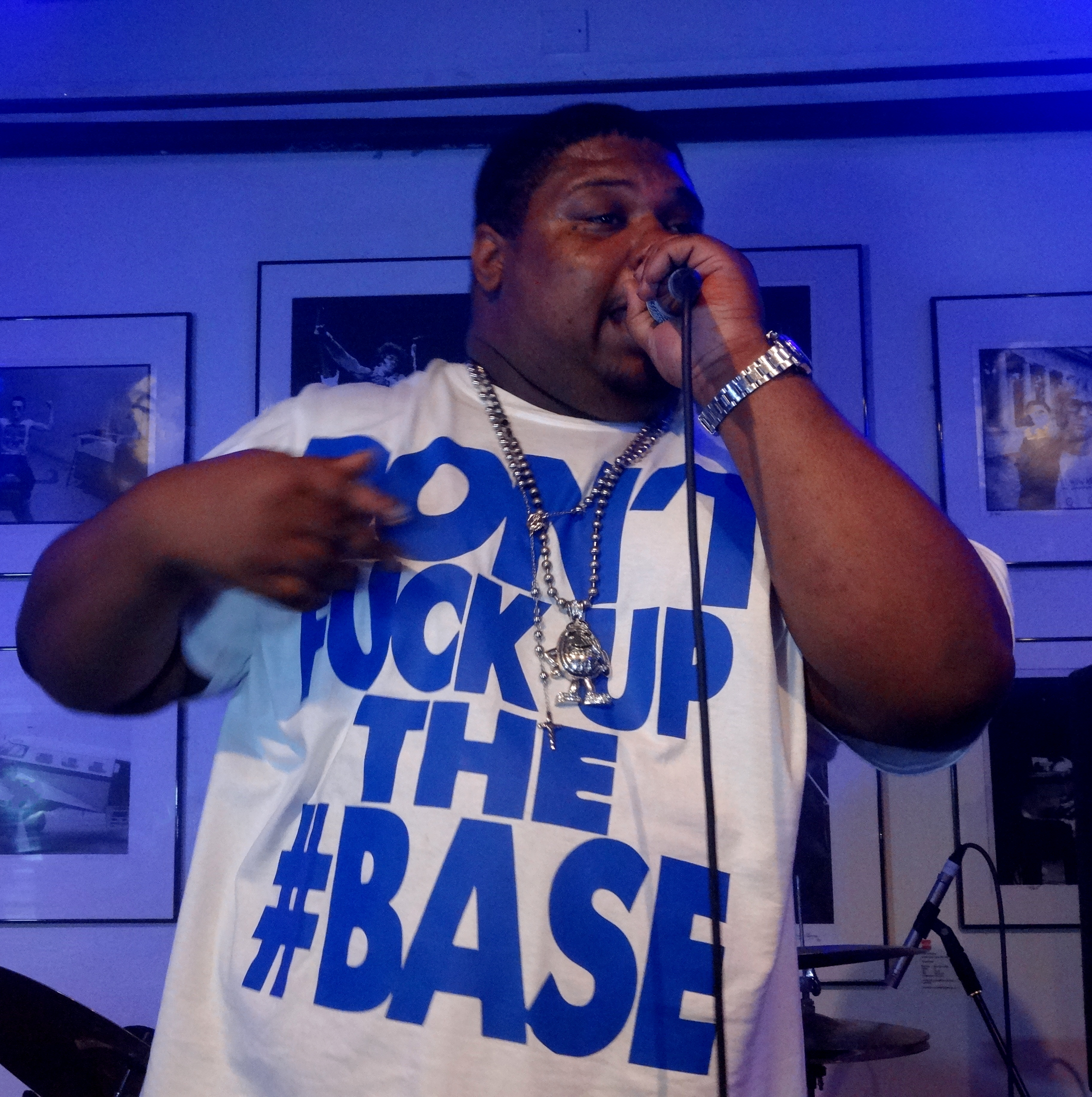
- Big Narstie in 2013

Background information
- Born: Tyrone Mark Lindo; 16 November 1985 (age 40); London, England
- Genres: Grime; hip-hop; comedy hip-hop
- Occupations: Rapper; songwriter; comedian; television presenter; author; internet personality
- Years active: 2002–present
- Label: Dice Recordings
- Website: bignarstie.com
- Other names: Fat T Phat T MC Narstie; Big Narst; Uncle Pain

YouTube information
- Channel: The Big Narstie Show
- Years active: 2018–present
- Subscribers: 166,000
- Views: 58.8 million
- Last updated: 19 July 2020

Tyrone Mark Lindo (born 16 November 1985), known by his stage name Big Narstie, is a British rapper, songwriter, comedian, television presenter, author and internet personality. He started his career in 2002 as a member of grime crew "N Double A," though he is better known for his solo work and as an internet personality performing comedy relating to grime music and the surrounding culture. He is also known for hosting his own chat show, The Big Narstie Show.

== Career ==
=== 2000s ===
Narstie began his working life as a dog trainer in his home town of Lambeth. In 2007, Big Narstie signed to independent label, Dice Recordings. His track "Brushman" was also named RWD magazine's "Song of the Year". Sampling Coldplay, it was supported by personalities from multiple mainstream radio stations.

Big Narstie has featured on records including Professor Green's "Before I Die Remix" and N-Dubz's "N-Dubz vs N.A.A", from their debut album Uncle B. Big Narstie continued to record and released BIG NARSTIE three other mixtapes: Mind of a Fat Guy, Drugs and Chicken, and I'm Betta Than U, which had guest appearances from Giggs, Scorcher, and Wretch 32.

=== 2010s ===
Big Narstie released his first mix CD of the year in February 2012, called Pain Overload. Shortly after, Pain Is Love was released in July for free download via SB.TV. Big Narstie's first official E.P, #PAIN was released in October and entered at number 5 in the iTunes UK Hip Hop chart and he won the 2012 Urban Music Award (UMAs) for Best Grime Act beating artists like Skepta, Lethal Bizzle and Dot Rotten.

In 2013, Big Narstie released his second EP Don't Fuck Up the Base. The EP Big Narstie was the highest selling grime EP of 2013. He also had a Don't Fuck up the Base EP launch party, which featured music artists, Flirta D, Mic Righteous, Scrufizzer, Kozzie and DJ's, DJ Cameo, Charlie Sloth, DJ Logan Sama.

He performed at a number of festivals across Europe including The Wireless Festival, A Day in Dam with English Frank and Black The Ripper, the Hip Hop Kemp Festival in Czech Republic and The Outlook Festival in Croatia. He also won UMA 2013 Best Grime Act award for the second year in a row. At the end of 2013 he released an EP Hello Hi. with True Tiger. Noisey named Big Narstie as their name of 2013. and he also reviewed the year at Fact magazine.

In 2014, Big Narstie released What's the Story Brixton Glory Part II, where he covered various Britpop classics by artists such as Oasis. He then embarked on the Base Defence League (BDL) Tour around the UK, which had a host of music artists supporting him.

Big Narstie was featured in Craig David's single, "When the Bassline Drops", which was released on 27 November 2015. The song saw commercial success, entering the UK top 10 and being certified Gold. In 2017 he rapped on the Enter Shikari single "Supercharge".

In 2017 he collaborated with Robbie Williams and Atlantic Horns on the song "Go Mental".

Channel 4 announced they had commissioned The Big Narstie Show following appearances from him on Gogglebox: Celebrity Special for Stand Up To Cancer and The Big Fat Quiz of the Year 2017. In 2019 he reappeared in the Big Fat Quiz, this time the Big Fat Quiz Of Everything

The first series of the show features guests including Ed Sheeran, Jonathan Ross, David Schwimmer, David Haye and Keith Lemon having joined hosts Big Narstie and Mo Gilligan.

The programme performed strongly for the network, with The Big Narstie Show rating as one of Channel 4's most popular programmes for young audiences. It was up 94% on the channel's share of 16–24-year-old viewers; up 129% on share for BAME viewers; and up 144% on share for black audiences. The show continued for five seasons, winning a BAFTA TV award in 2021 for best comedy entertainment programme.

During 2018 Big Narstie also appeared on Good Morning Britain reading the weather report which went viral. He also appeared on Celebrity Crystal Maze for Stand Up To Cancer, Celebrity Juice, Would I Lie to You? and The Chris Ramsey Show. He also started in the cinema hit The Festival.

Big Narstie was caught up in controversy in 2018 during an episode of Britain's Got More Talent when he appears to push contestant Robert White during a live show. The pair resolved the issue publicly on Twitter.

In 2020, Big Narstie featured on the track 'Catch 22' by NAHLI produced by DaVinChe. The track is described as luxurious, defiantly old-skool UK garage-inspired track.

=== Grime comedy ===
Big Narstie was cited by music blog 'RansomNote' as one of the first in the 'grime comedy' genre. The blog states "Big Narstie is probably the don of this – at either end of his career you can find lyrics and beats drenched with sorrow, regret and nostalgia" and goes onto talk about the subjective opinion of the audience – "the fact that most outsiders can't tell the difference between rage and satire tells you more about the audience than the performer".

== Other activities ==
Away from music, Big Narstie has featured in the Channel 4 sitcom Dubplate Drama alongside N-Dubz and Shystie. He has also had a guest appearance in the films Anuvahood and London State of Mind. He is set to appear in the series Krish and Lee and the film Rise of the Foot Soldier 2. From 29 June 2018, he hosted The Big Narstie Show.

Big Narstie is a keen football fan and supports both Millwall and Manchester United. He also began training in Brazilian Jiu Jitsu in 2020 in a bid to improve his fitness.

He has appeared on a number of panel shows including The Big Fat Quiz of the Year 2017 in a team with Katherine Ryan and again in 2019, and Would I Lie to You? on David Mitchell's team.

Big Narstie creates YouTube videos including a parody agony aunt style series Uncle Pain.

Big Narstie appeared in The Great British Bake Off "The Great Stand Up to Cancer Bake Off", series 2, episode 3. He completed two of three challenges; he did not appear at the third challenge due to being taken ill; he was replaced in the challenge by presenter Sandi Toksvig.

== Personal life ==
Big Narstie is of Jamaican descent. He has two children, one of whom Ed Sheeran is godfather to.

He lives in Brixton, South London.

In 2021, Narstie's cousin Nathaniel appeared on the dating programme First Dates.

== Discography ==
=== Albums ===
Year	Title
2018	BDL Bipolar (2018)

=== EPs ===
Year	Title
2011	Pain Therapy
2013	Pain
2013	Don't Fuck Up the Base
2013	Hello High (with True Tiger)
2016	Base Society

=== Mixtapes ===
Year	Title
2005	I'm Betta Than U Vol. 1
2006	What's the Story Brixton Glory
2007	Hey It's That Fat Guy
2007	Drugs and Chicken
2008	Fuck a 9–5
2008	Fat and Proud
2009	The Big Man Returns
2012	Pain Is Love
2012	Pain Overload

== Filmography ==
Television
Year	Title	Role	Notes
2015	Rise of the Footsoldier: Part II	Bob	
2015	What's Up (Sky 1)	Himself	Guest
2016	Gangsters Gamblers Geezers	Nano	
2017	Alan Carr's New Year's Eve Spectacular	Himself	Guest
2017	Big Fat Quiz of the Year	Himself	Guest
2018-2022	The Big Narstie Show	Himself	Host
2018-2022	Good Morning Britain	Himself	Guest appearance on 6 episodes
2022	Don't Hate The Playaz	Himself	Guest
2018	The Festival	Himself	The Musician
2018	Celebrity Juice	Himself	
2018	Would I Lie to You?	Himself	Season 12, Episode 4 (Guest)
2018	Crystal Maze	Himself	
2018	The Jonathan Ross Show	Himself	Season 13, Episode 14 (Guest)
2019	The Great Stand Up to Cancer Bake Off	Himself	Season 2, Episode 3 (Guest)
2019	Big Fat Quiz of Everything	Himself	Guest
2020	Big Narstie's Big Adventure: Jamaica	Himself	Host
2021	The Wheel	Himself	Series 2, Episode 5 (Guest)
2023	The Wheel	Himself	Series 4, Episode 4 (Guest)
2024	The Wheel	Himself	Series 5, Episode 6 (Guest)
2025	Michael McIntyre's Big Show	Himself	Guest appearance with Jonathan Ross
2025	Michael McIntyre's Christmas Wheel	Himself	Expert

== Awards ==
- Urban Music Awards 2012 Urban Music Award (UMAs) Best Grime Act (Won)
- Urban Music Awards 2013 Urban Music Award (UMAs) Best Grime Act (Won)
- MOBO Awards 2014 Mobo Award Best Grime Act (Nomination)
- Urban Music Awards 2014 Urban Music Award (UMAs) Best Grime Act (Won)
- Urban Music Awards 2018 – Best Album (Won)
- MVISA 2018 – Best TV Presenter – The Big Narstie Show (Won)
- National Reality Television Awards – Best Entertainment Show for The Big Narstie Show (Won)
- National Television Awards – Bruce Forsyth Entertainment award for The Big Narstie Show (Nomination)
- Royal Television Society Awards – Best Entertainment Performance for The Big Narstie Show (Won 2020)
- BAFTA – Best Comedy Entertainment Show – The Big Narstie Show (Nomination 2019)

Royal Television Society Awards – Best Entertainment Performance for The Big Narstie Show (Won 2021)

- BAFTA – Best Comedy Entertainment Show – The Big Narstie Show (Won 2021)
