= Romans (musician) =

English singer, songwriter, and record producer (born 1986)

RØMANS
- Born: Samuel Elliot Roman; 15 September 1986 (age 40); Pinner, Middlesex, England
- Genres: Pop; R&B; rock; soul; hip hop
- Occupations: Singer; songwriter; multi-instrumentalist; record producer
- Instruments: Vocals; piano; guitar; drums
- Years active: 2014–present

Sam Roman (born 15 September 1986), known by his stage name Romans (stylised as RØMANS), is an English singer, songwriter, and record producer. He rose to prominence in 2014 after signing with Roc Nation, where he released four EPs between 2015 and 2017. Following this, he shifted his focus to writing and producing songs for other artists full-time. He has since written and produced songs for artists such as Lewis Capaldi, Ed Sheeran, Camila Cabello, Demi Lovato, Maroon 5, Alicia Keys, John Legend, Calvin Harris, and Jonas Blue. In 2020, he was nominated for Song of the Year at the 62nd Annual Grammy Awards for writing "Someone You Loved" by Lewis Capaldi.

== Early life ==
Romans was born in Pinner, Middlesex. He attended Orley Farm Prep School, Harrow where he was taught, amongst other instruments, the piano. He also taught himself to play guitar, cello, piano, drums, and saxophone, as well as teaching himself how to produce. His first gig was the Northwood Hills hotel at the age of 13, and he left school at 16 to pursue music full-time.

== Career ==
Romans' early career included the release of numerous singles as well as featured vocals. In July 2014, Romans was featured on "Home" off Naughty Boy's debut-album, Hotel Cabana, their collaboration was released as a single. On 6 May 2014, it was announced that he had signed a record deal with Roc Nation.

On 10 July 2015 Romans released his first EP with Roc Nation titled Overthinking Pt. 1 which included his debut single "Uh Huh". Also in 2015, he released another single "The Agony And The Ecstasy" as well as his second EP Act 1. In 2016, Romans released his third EP Silence along with the singles "Prisoner (featuring Rejjie Snow)" and "Silence - AlunaGeorge edit". Automatic, his fourth and final EP was released in 2017 along with the singles "Happy Love" and "Love Is The Beast (featuring Avelino)".

Over the course of 2018 and 2019, Romans released a number of singles from an unreleased project titled People. His music style has been described as a mix of soul, pop and hip-hop.

In 2018, Romans co-wrote "Someone You Loved" by Lewis Capaldi. The song was a commercial success, peaking at No. 1 on the UK Singles Chart and the Billboard Hot 100. For his work on the song, Romans won Song of the Year at the 2020 Brit Awards and was nominated for Song of the Year at the 62nd Grammy Awards.

In 2022, Romans launched his own label, Chosen People, via AWAL/Sony.

== Discography ==
=== Extended plays ===
List of extended plays, showing release date and track listing
Title	Details	Notes
Overthinking Pt. 1	Released: 10 July 2015; Label: Roc Nation; Formats: Digital download	Track listing: | No. | Title | Length | |---|---|---| | 1. | "Uh Huh" | 4:05 | | 2. | "I'm Not The Father" | 3:27 | | 3. | "Overthinking" | 4:09 | | 4. | "Life in Monochrome" | 4:38 | | Total length: | | 16:21 |
Act I	Released: 11 December 2015; Label: Roc Nation; Formats: Digital download	Track listing: | No. | Title | Length | |---|---|---| | 1. | "The Die Is Cast" | 3:36 | | 2. | "Ballad Of A Figure 8" | 4:03 | | 3. | "This Might Hurt" | 4:47 | | Total length: | | 12:27 |
Silence	Released: 25 March 2016; Label: Roc Nation; Formats: Digital download	Track listing: | No. | Title | Length | |---|---|---| | 1. | "Prisoner (featuring Rejjie Snow)" | 3:59 | | 2. | "Silence - AlunaGeorge Edit" | 3:23 | | 3. | "Pacify" | 3:37 | | 4. | "Overthinking - Maths Time Joy Edit" | 4:08 | | Total length: | | 15:08 |
Automatic	Released: 31 March 2017; Label: Roc Nation; Formats: Digital download	Track listing: | No. | Title | Length | |---|---|---| | 1. | "Happy Love" | 4:08 | | 2. | "Stranger Things Have Happened" | 3:50 | | 3. | "Love Is The Beast (featuring Avelino)" | 2:55 | | 4. | "Automatic" | 4:03 | | Total length: | | 14:59 |

=== Singles ===
==== As lead artist ====
List of singles as lead artist, showing year released and album name
Title	Year	Album
"Uh Huh"	2015	Overthinking Pt. 1
"The Agony And The Ecstasy"	2015	Non-album single
"Prisoner" (featuring Rejjie Snow)	2016	Silence
"Silence - AlunaGeorge Edit"	2016	Silence
"Happy Love"	2017	Automatic
"Love Is The Beast" (featuring Avelino)	2017	Automatic
"Glitter & Gold"	2018	Non-album singles
"Crashing Waves"	2018	Non-album singles
"Perfect"	2018	Non-album singles
"People"	2018	Non-album singles
"Oxygen"	2018	Non-album singles
"Important"	2018	Non-album singles
"Animals"	2018	Non-album singles
"Be Fine"	2019	Non-album singles
"Old Times Sake"	2019	Non-album singles

==== As featured artist ====
List of singles as featured artist, showing year released, selected chart positions, and album name
Title	Year	Peak chart positions	Album
Title	Year	UK	Album
"Home" (Naughty Boy featuring Romans)	2014	45	Hotel Cabana
"Saving My Life" (Gorgon City featuring Romans)	2015	92	Non-album singles
"Dancing Alone" (Axwell & Ingrosso featuring Romans)	2018	—	Non-album singles
"Hit The Lights" (Ghosted featuring Romans)	2018	—	Non-album singles

== Songwriting and production discography ==
=== Selected charting and certified singles ===
List of singles as songwriter, with selected chart positions and certifications, showing year released, artist, album, and song title
Year	Artist	Album	Song	Peak chart positions			Certifications
Year	Artist	Album	Song	US	US Pop	UK	Certifications
2016	AlunaGeorge	I Remember	"I'm in Control" (featuring Popcaan)	—	—	39	BPI: Silver
2017	Craig David	The Time Is Now	"Heartline"	—	—	24	BPI: Gold
2018	Clean Bandit	What Is Love?	"Tears" (featuring Louisa Johnson)	—	—	5	BPI: 2× Platinum
2018	Demi Lovato	Non-album single	"Sober"	47	—	63	RIAA: Gold; ARIA: Platinum; BPI: Silver
2018	Jonas Blue	Blue	"Mama" (featuring William Singe)	—	32	4	RIAA: Gold; ARIA: 6× Platinum; BPI: 2× Platinum
2018	Jonas Blue	Blue	"Rise" (featuring Jack & Jack)	—	37	3	RIAA: Gold; ARIA: 6× Platinum; BPI: 2× Platinum
2018	Jonas Blue	Blue	"Polaroid" (featuring Liam Payne and Lennon Stella)	—	—	12	RIAA: Gold; ARIA: Platinum; BPI: Platinum
2019	Lewis Capaldi	Divinely Uninspired to a Hellish Extent	"Someone You Loved"	1	1	1	RIAA: Diamond; ARIA: 15× Platinum; BPI: 9× Platinum
2020	Demi Lovato	Dancing with the Devil... the Art of Starting Over	"Anyone"	34	—	—	RIAA: Gold
2020	Elley Duhé	Phoenix	"Middle of the Night"	—	—	43	RIAA: Platinum; ARIA: Platinum; BPI: Gold
2020	John Legend	Bigger Love	"Wild" (featuring Gary Clark Jr.)	—	—	—	RIAA: Gold; ARIA: Gold
2021	Nessa Barrett	Non-album single	"la di die" (featuring jxdn)	—	30	—	RIAA: Gold
2021	Ed Sheeran	=	"The Joker And The Queen" (solo or featuring Taylor Swift)	21	30	2	BPI: Gold
2022	Dermot Kennedy	Sonder	"Better Days"	—	—	16	RIAA: Gold; ARIA: Platinum; BPI: Platinum
2023	Labrinth	Ends & Begins	"Never Felt So Alone"	62	36	33	RIAA: Gold; ARIA: Gold; BPI: Silver
2023	Calvin Harris	Non-album single	"Desire" (with Sam Smith)	—	—	6	ARIA: Gold; BPI: Gold

=== All songwriting credits ===
List of songs as songwriter showing year released, artist, album, song title, and co-writers
Year	Artist	Album	Song	Co-written with	Ref(s).
2014	Mary J. Blige	The London Sessions	"Doubt"	Mary J. Blige	
2014	Mary J. Blige	The London Sessions	"My Loving"	Mary J. Blige, Rodney Jerkins	
2014	Mary J. Blige	The London Sessions	"Long Hard Look"	Ben Harrison, Harry Craze, Hugo Chegwin, James Murray, Mustafa Omar	
2014	Olly Murs	Never Been Better	"We Still Love"	Olly Murs, Steve Robson	
2014	Rea Garvey	Pride	"Bow Before You"	Rea Garvey	
2014	Mayaeni	Non-album single	"Black Jeans"	Mayaeni Strauss	
2014	Alexa Goddard	Marilyn	"Marilyn"	Mikkel Eriksen, Tor Erik Hermansen	
2015	Claudia Leitte	Non-album single	"Shiver Down My Spine"	Claudia Cristina Inacio Pedreira	
2015	Disclosure	Caracal	"Jaded"	James Napier, Guy Lawrence, Howard Lawrence	
2015	Kwabs	Love + War	"Father Figure"	Joan Armatrading, Kwabena Adjepong	
2015	Melissa Steel	Non-album single	"You Love Me?" (featuring Wretch 32)	Rodney Jerkins, Wretch 32	
2015	Stefanie Heinzmann	Chance Of Rain	"In The End"	Edvard Erjford, Henrik Michelsen, Stefanie Heinzmann	
2015	Stefanie Heinzmann	Chance Of Rain	"Falling"	Edvard Erjford, Henrik Michelsen, Stefanie Heinzmann	
2015	Stefanie Heinzmann	Chance Of Rain	"What's On Your Mind"	Edvard Erjford, Henrik Michelsen, Stefanie Heinzmann, Pat Fa	
2015	Andreas Kümmert	Here I Am	"Simple Man"	Andy Murray	
2016	Birdy	Beautiful Lies	"Beautiful Lies"	Jasmine Van den Bogaerde	
2016	Birdy	Beautiful Lies	"Growing Pains"	Jasmine Van den Bogaerde	
2016	Birdy	Beautiful Lies	"Beating Heart"	Jasmine Van den Bogaerde	
2016	Mustard	Cold Summer	"10,000 Hours" (featuring Ella Mai)	Ella Mai, Dijon McFarlane, Jordan Holt, Derrus Rachel	
2016	Låpsley	Long Way Home	"Love Is Blind"	Holly Lapsley Fletcher	
2016	AlunaGeorge	I Remember	"I'm In Control" (featuring Popcaan)	Aluna Francis, George Reid, Mark Ralph, Andre Sutherland	
2016	Seafret	Tell Me It's Real	"Over"	Harry Draper, Steve Robson, Jack Sedmen	
2016	Netsky	3	"Work It Out" (featuring Digital Farm Animals)	Boris Daenen, Nick Gale, Teddy Geiger, Evan Voytas	
2017	Little Mix	Glory Days	"Down & Dirty"	Perrie Edwards, Jesy Nelson Leigh-Anne Pinnock, Jade Thirlwall, Maegan Cottone, Fridolin Walcher	
2017	Little Mix	Glory Days	"Private Show"	Perrie Edwards, Jesy Nelson Leigh-Anne Pinnock, Jade Thirlwall, Maegan Cottone, Fridolin Walcher	
2017	Little Mix	Glory Days	"If I Get My Way"	Ben Kohn, Pete Kelleher, Tom Barnes, Rachel Keen	
2017	Little Mix	Glory Days	"Is Your Love Enough?"	Edvard Erfjord, Henrik Michelson, Eyelar Mirzazadeh, Fred Gibson	
2017	Ella Mai	READY	"Breakfast in Bed"	Ella Mai, Dijon McFarlane, Lewis Hughes, Te White Warbrick, Nicholas Audino	
2017	Ella Mai	READY	"Makes Me Wonder"	Te White Warbrick, Ella Mai, Dijon McFarlane, Charles Hinshaw Jr., Nicholas Audino, Lewis Hughes	
2017	Noah Cyrus	Non-album single	"I'm Stuck"	Jenna Andrews, Noah Cyrus, Timothy McKenzie	
2017	Rag'n'Bone Man	Human	"Fade to Nothing"	Rory Graham, Mark Crew, Dan Priddy	
2017	Craig David	The Time Is Now	"Heartline"	Craig David, Guy James Robin	
2017	Naughty Boy	Non-album single	"One Chance To Dance" (featuring Joe Jonas)	Emeli Sandé, Matthew Holmes, Philip Leigh, Shahid Khan	
2017	DNCE	A Very ROC Christmas	"Christmas Without You"		
2018	Youngr	This Is Not An Album	"Monsters"	Dario Younger Brigham-Bowes	
2018	Gavin James	Only Ticket Home	"Hearts On Fire"	Gavin James	
2018	Clean Bandit	What Is Love?	"Tears" (featuring Louisa Johnson)	Jack Patterson	
2018	Clean Bandit	What Is Love?	"Should've Known Better" (featuring Anne-Marie)	Jack Patterson, Anne-Marie Nicholson	
2018	Little Big Town	Non-album single	"Summer Fever"	Jesse Frasure, Pete Bellotte, Cary Barlowe, Karen Renee Fairchild	
2018	Justine Skye	ULTRAVIOLET	"Don't Think About It"	Ben Kohn, Pete Kelleher, Tom Barnes, Rachel Keen	
2018	Demi Lovato	Non-album single	"Sober"	Mark Landon, Tushar Apte, Demi Lovato	
2018	Ruel	Ready	"Not Thinkin' Bout You"	Larry Darnell Griffin Jr., Mark Landon, Ruel van Djik, Tobias Jesso Jr.	
2018	Matoma	One in a Million	"One in a Million"	Thomas Lagergren, Ben Kohn, Pete Kelleher, Tom Barnes, Sverre Indris Joner	
2018	Jonas Blue	Blue	"Mama" (featuring William Singe)	Ed Drewett, Guy James Robin	
2018	Jonas Blue	Blue	"Rise" (featuring Jack & Jack)	Ed Drewett, Guy James Robin	
2018	Jonas Blue	Blue	"Polaroid" (featuring Liam Payne and Lennon Stella)	John Paul Cooper, Ed Drewett, Guy James Robin	
2018	Jonas Blue	Blue	"Younger" (featuring HRVY)	Guy James Robin	
2018	AJ Mitchell	Hopeful	"Girls"	Aaron Mitchell	
2018	Rita Ora	Phoenix	"Velvet Rope"	Rita Ora, James Napier	
2018	Michael Calfan	Non-album single	"On You"	Oladayo Olatunji, Michael Calfan, Chiara Hunter	
2018	Rea Garvey	Neon	"Different World"	Rea Garvey	
2019	James Arthur	You	"From Me To You I Hate Everybody"	James Arthur, Jamie Hartman	
2019	push baby	Non-album single	"mama's house"	Wayne Hector, Danny Wilkin, Jake Roche, Steve Robson	
2019	Maddie Poppe	Whirlwind	"Not Losing You"	Johan Carlsson, Maddie Poppe	
2019	Maddie Poppe	Whirlwind	"Made You Miss"	Ross Golan, Johan Carlsson, Maddie Poppe	
2019	Digital Farm Animals	Non-album single	"Lookin' For" (featuring Danny Ocean)	Danny Ocean, Nick Gale, Will Vaughan	
2019	Lewis Capaldi	Divinely Uninspired to a Hellish Extent	"Someone You Loved"	Lewis Capaldi, Ben Kohn, Pete Kelleher, Tom Barnes	
2019	Tom Walker	What a Time to Be Alive	"How Can You Sleep at Night?"	Tom Walker, Steve Robson	
2019	Tom Walker	What a Time to Be Alive	"Heartbeats"	Tom Walker, Ben Kohn, Pete Kelleher, Tom Barnes,	
2019	Maisie Peters	Non-album single	"Stay Young"	Maisie Peters	
2019	Khalid	Free Spirit	"Self"	Khalid Robinson, Chauncey Hollis	
2019	Jonas Blue	Non-album single	"Billboard" (featuring Tifa Chen)	Madison Love, Guy James Robin	
2019	Zhavia	17	"17"	Chauncey Hollis, Carisa Zhavia Ward, Dustin Corbett	
2019	Alaina Castillo	antisocial butterfly	"back to you"	Alaina Castillo	
2019	Alaina Castillo	antisocial butterfly	"no importa"	Ale Alberti, Alaina Castillo	
2019	Alaina Castillo	antisocial butterfly	"i don't think i love you anymore"	Alaina Castillo	
2019	Alaina Castillo	antisocial butterfly	"mentiras"	Alaina Castillo	
2019	Alaina Castillo	antisocial butterfly	"papacito"	Alaina Castillo, Joel Castillo	
2019	AJ Mitchell	Slow Dance	"Talk So Much"	Aaron Frederick Mitchell, Jr.	
2019	AJ Mitchell	Slow Dance	"Out My Mind"	Steph Jones, Aaron Frederick Mitchell, Jr.	
2019	AJ Mitchell	Non-album single	"Unstoppable"	Aaron Frederick Mitchell, Jr.	
2019	Newton Faulkner	Non-album single	"I'll Be There"	Camille Purcell, Edvard Erfjord, Finlay Smith, Henrik Michelsen, Jerker Hansson, Jessica Glynne	
2019	Winnie Raeder	From Here	"I Wear A Ghost"	Winnie Raeder	
2019	Lawrence Taylor	Poor Boy	"Home"	Lachlan Bostock	
2019	Camila Cabello	Romance	"This Love"	Camila Cabello, Dayyon Alexander, Jeff Shum	
2020	Elley Duhé	Phoenix	"Middle of the Night"	Andrew Wells, Elley Duhé	
2020	Elley Duhé	Non-album single	"Love Me Hard"	Andrew Wells, Elley Duhé	
2020	Louise	Heavy Love	"Lead Me On"	Louise Redknapp, Chloe Latimer, Jack Patterson	
2020	Demi Lovato	Dancing with the Devil... the Art of Starting Over	"Anyone"	Bibi Bourelly, Dayyon Alexander, Eyelar Mirzazadeh, Demi Lovato, Jay Mooncie	
2020	Meghan Trainor	TREAT MYSELF	"Babygirl"	Mike Sabath, Meghan Trainor	
2020	X Ambassadors	Belong	"Everything Sounds Like A Love Song"	Andrew Wotman, Casey Harris, Sam Nelson Harris, Adam Levin	
2020	John Legend	Bigger Love	"Wild" (featuring Gary Clark Jr.)	Jake Torrey, John Stephens, Ben Kohn, Pete Kelleher, Tom Barnes	
2020	Will	Manchester	"Estate"	Lewis Capaldi, Ben Kohn, Pete Kelleher, Tom Barnes	
2020	Jonas Blue	Non-album single	"Naked" (featuring MAX)	Ed Drewett, Guy James Robin	
2020	Route 94	Non-album single	"Sad Songs" (featuring L Devine)	Jonathan Simpson, Michael Pollack, Olivia Devine, Rowan Jones	
2020	Alaina Castillo	Non-album single	"valentine's day"	Alaina Castillo	
2020	Alaina Castillo	Non-album single	"ocean waves"	Alaina Castillo	
2020	Alaina Castillo	the voicenotes	"just a boy"	Alaina Castillo	
2020	Alaina Castillo	the voicenotes	"pass you by"	Alaina Castillo	
2020	Alaina Castillo	the voicenotes	"sad girl"	Alaina Castillo	
2020	Alaina Castillo	the voicenotes	"voicenote"	Alaina Castillo	
2020	Alaina Castillo	Non-album single	"tonight"	Alaina Castillo	
2020	Alaina Castillo	Non-album single	"¡párate!"	Ale Alberti, Alaina Castillo	
2020	Alaina Castillo	Non-album single	"wishlist"	Alaina Castillo	
2020	Lennon Stella	Three. Two. One.	"Much Too Much"	Lennon Stella, Malay Ho, Simon Wilcox	
2020	Matt Stell	Better Than That	"Sadie"	Diederick Van Elsas, Parrish Warrington, Nate Cyphert	
2020	Alicia Keys	Alicia	"Gramercy Park"	Alicia Keys, Jimmy Napes	
2021	Nessa Barrett	Non-album single	"la di die" (featuring jxdn)	Elizabeth Lowell Boland, Jaden Hossler, Leo Mellace, Megan Buelow, Travis Barker, Nessa Barrett	
2021	Mary J. Blige	Non-album single	"Hourglass (from the Amazon OriginalDocumentary: Mary J. Blige's My Life)"	Andy Murray, Benjamin Wright, Mary J. Blige, Teddy Riley	
2021	Maroon 5	Jordi	"Echo" (featuring blackbear)	Adam Levine, Matthew Musto, Jake Torrey, Michael Pollack, Henry Walter	
2021	Alaina Castillo	parallel universe pt. 1	"pocket locket"	Alaina Castillo	
2021	Alaina Castillo	parallel universe pt. 1	"down 4 u"	Alaina Castillo	
2021	Alaina Castillo	parallel universe pt. 1	"parallel universe"	Alaina Castillo	
2021	Alaina Castillo	parallel universe pt. 1	"stfu (i got u)"	Alaina Castillo	
2021	Alaina Castillo	parallel universe pt. 1	"indica"	Alaina Castillo	
2021	Alaina Castillo	parallel universe pt. 1	"make it rain"	Alaina Castillo	
2021	Alaina Castillo	parallel universe pt. 1	"tėn cømmåndmėnts"	Alaina Castillo	
2021	Alaina Castillo	Non-album single	"wish you were here"	Alaina Castillo	
2021	Alaina Castillo	Non-album single	"lips (Original Music from The L Word: Generation Q)"	Alaina Castillo	
2021	Mimi Webb	Non-album single	"Reasons"	Daniel Klein, Matthew Campfield, Steph Jones, Samuel Wishkoski	
2021	Natti Natasha	Nattividad	"Imposible Amor" (with Maluma)	Édgar Barrera, Andrea Mangiamarchi, Juan Luis Londoño Aria, Natalia Alexandra Gutiérrez Batista, Rafael Pina Nieves	
2021	Chris Malinchak	Night Work	"Somebody"	Dave Kelly, Steve Robson, Chris Malinchak	
2021	Ed Sheeran	=	"The Joker And The Queen" (solo or featuring Taylor Swift)	Johnny McDaid, Fred Gibson, Ed Sheeran	
2021	Celeste	Not Your Muse	"Some Goodbyes Come With Hellos"	Gregory Aldae Hein, Jamie Hartman, Celeste Epiphany Waite	
2022	Alec Benjamin	(Un)Commentary	"The Way You Felt"	Nolan Lambroza, Alec Benjamin, Justin Lucas, Lenno Linjama	
2022	Alec Benjamin	(Un)Commentary	"Dopamine Addict"	Nolan Lambroza, Alec Benjamin, Justin Lucas	
2022	Alec Benjamin	(Un)Commentary	"Hipocrite"	Alec Benjamin	
2022	Alec Benjamin	(Un)Commentary	"Nancy Got A Haircut"	Alec Benjamin	
2022	Alec Benjamin	(Un)Commentary	"Nuance"	Nolan Lambroza, Alec Benjamin, Justin Lucas	
2022	Jonas Blue	Non-album single	"Always Be There" (with Luisa Johnson)	Andrew Wells, Maya K, Guy James Robin	
2022	Alaina Castillo	fantasies	"sad girls always finish first"	Alaina Castillo	
2022	Alaina Castillo	fantasies	"tell the one u love"	Alaina Castillo	
2022	Alaina Castillo	fantasies	"party in my head (ur not invited)"	Alaina Castillo	
2022	Alaina Castillo	fantasies	"get better"	Alaina Castillo	
2022	Alaina Castillo	fantasies	"call me when ur lonely"	Alaina Castillo	
2022	Alaina Castillo	fantasies	"fantasies"	Alaina Castillo	
2022	Dermot Kennedy	Sonder	"Better Days"	Dermot Kennedy, Scott Harris, Dan Nigro, Carey Willetts	
2022	Dermot Kennedy	Sonder	"Something to Someone"	Dermot Kennedy, Scott Harris, Jonah Seth Rawitz	
2022	JP Cooper	She	"Holy Water"	Ben Kohn, Pete Kelleher, Tom Barnes, JP Cooper	
2022	SAINT PHNX	Happy Place	"Blue Feather"	Alan Jukes, Stephen Jukes	
2022	SAINT PHNX	Non-album single	"Make Us Dream"	Alan Jukes, Stephen Jukes	
2022	SAINT PHNX	Non-album single	"Friends"	Alan Jukes, Stephen Jukes	
2022	Francis Karel	Handle with Care	"Dancing on Your Own"	Francis Karel, Maya K	
2023	Shania Twain	Queen of Me	"Giddy Up!"	David Stewart, Shania Twain, Jessica Agombar	
2023	Pink	Trustfall	"Lost Cause"	Wrabel, Sam de Jong	
2023	Labrinth	Ends & Begins	"Never Felt So Alone"	Timothy McKenzie, Finneas O'Connell, Billie Eilish O'Connell, Aether Zemar-McKenzie, Nula Zemar-McKenzie, Fred Gibson	
2023	Benson Boone	Pulse	"Little Runaway"	Jack LaFrantz, Jason Evigan, Benson Boone	
2023	Calvin Harris	Non-album single	"Desire" (with Sam Smith)	Adam Wiles, Matthew Burns, Sam Smith	
2023	Alaina Castillo	malos hábitos	"éxtasis"	Alaina Castillo, Andrés Davis Restrepo Echavarría, Matt Burns	
2023	Alaina Castillo	malos hábitos	"luna de miel"	Alaina Castillo, Maria Alejandra Osorio	
2023	Alaina Castillo	malos hábitos	"hookah envenena"	Alaina Castillo, Andrés Davis Restrepo Echavarría	
2023	Alaina Castillo	malos hábitos	"sabateo"	Alaina Castillo, Maria Alejandra Osorio	
2023	Alaina Castillo	malos hábitos	"me conquistaste"	Alaina Castillo, Maria Alejandra Osorio, Tim Suby	
2023	Alaina Castillo	Non-album single	"running water"	Alaina Castillo	
2023	Adekunle Gold	Tequila Ever After	"Do You Mind?"	Adekunle Kosoko, Oladayo Olatunji, Udoma Amba	
2023	Sexyy Red	Hood Hottest Princess	"I Might" (featuring Summer Walker)	Benjamin Dyer Diehl, Janae Wherry, Amanda Ibanez, Nija Charles, Phil Phever, Jacob Kasher Hindlin	
2023	Rosa Linn	Lay Your Hands Upon My Heart	"Hallelujah"	Peter Rycroft, Roza Kostandyan	
2023	Rosa Linn	Lay Your Hands Upon My Heart	"Mountains"	Rick Nowels, Roza Kostandyan	
2023	The Scarlet Opera	Comedy	"The Place To Be"	David Stewart, Jessica Agombar, Chance Taylor, Colin Kenrick, Daniel Zuker, Justin Siegal, Mathew Bazulka	
2023	The Scarlet Opera	Comedy	"Big City Thing"	David Stewart, Jessica Agombar, Chance Taylor, Colin Kenrick, Daniel Zuker, Justin Siegal, Mathew Bazulka	
2023	TALK	Lord of the Flies & Birds & Bees	"Harder It Breaks"	Connor Riddell, Nicholas Durocher, Ben Kohn, Pete Kelleher, Tom Barnes	
2023	Dillon Francis	This Mixtape is Fire TOO	"I'm My Only Friend" (featuring Arden Jones)	Matt Burns, Dillon Hart Francis, Peter Rycroft, Maya K	
2023	Fabio Guerra	Non-album single	"AY! Que Dolor."	Fabio Alejandro Guerra Cuellar	
2023	Colin Stough	Promiseland	"If Not For Me"	Jamie Hartman, Charles Kelley	
2024	PNAU	Hyperbolic	"Nostalgia"	Nick Littlemore, Amanda Ibanez, Peter Mayes	
2024	Leigh-Anne	No Hard Feelings	"Stealin' Love"	Ian Kirkpatrick, Philip Plested, Jermaine Jackson, Leigh-Anne Pinnock	
2024	Fabio Guerra	Non-album single	"Dos Mujeres a la Vez"	Fabio Alejandro Guerra Cuellar	
2024	Ben Platt	Honeymind	"Honeymind"	Michael Pollack, Ben Platt	
2024	LAY	STEP	"Step"	David Stewart, Jessica Agombar, SAM	
2024	Billy Currington	Non-album single	"Everything Is Changing"	Will Weatherly, Cary Barlowe, Billy Currington	
2024	Sam Tompkins	hi, my name is insecure.	"die for someone"	Andrew Wells, Sam Tompkins	
2024	Katseye	SIS (Soft Is Strong)	"I'm Pretty"	Amanda Ibanez, Nick Gale, Richard Boardman	
2024	Yung Gravy	Serving Country	"Back On That Horse"	Matt Burns, David Wilson, Jake Torrey, Phil Plested, Brandon Stewart, Matthew Hauri	
2024	Daniel Seavey	Non-album single	"Gateway Drug"	Nick Long, Michael Pollack, Ryan Daly, Daniel Seavey	
2024	Ruel	Non-album single	"Cats on the Ceiling"	Jake Torrey, Elias Danielsen, Mark Landon, Ruel van Dijk	
2024	Alaina Castillo	Non-album single	"crush"	Alaina Castillo	
2024	Alaina Castillo	Non-album single	"starz"	Alaina Castillo	
2024	Alaina Castillo	Non-album single	"pretty little thing"	Alaina Castillo	
2024	dearALICE	Made in Korea: The K-Pop Experience (Original TV Soundtrack)	"Best Day of Our Lives"	Mike Needle, Steve Mac, Tom Brennan	
2024	Shaboozey	Non-album single	"Good News"	Jake Torrey, Collins Obinna Chibueze, Nevin Sastry, Michael Pollack, Sean Cook	
2025	Alaina Castillo	Non-album single	"last night"	Alaina Castillo	
2025	Maddox Batson	First Dance	"Girl In Green"	Maddox Batson, Peter Fenn	
2025	James Corden	Smurfs Movie Soundtrack (Music From & Inspired By)	"Always On The Outside"		
2025	TWICE	This is For	"Mars"	Camille Angelina Purcell, Perrie Edwards, Will Bloomfield	
2026	Chelsea Cutler	Is This The End?	"You've Only Ever Been Mine"	Andrew Wells, Chelsea Cutler, Lily Kaplan	

=== Production credits ===
List of songs as producer showing year released, artist, album, song title, and co-producers
Year	Artist	Album	Song	Co-produced with	Ref(s).
2014	Mary J. Blige	The London Sessions	"Doubt"	Rodney "Darkchild" Jerkins	
2014	Rea Garvey	Pride	"Bow Before You"	Andy Chatterley	
2014	Mayaeni	Non-album single	"Black Jeans"		
2015	Kwabs	Love + War	"Father Figure"		
2016	Birdy	Beautiful Lies	"Beautiful Lies"	Birdy	
2016	Mahalia	Diary Of Me	"Back up Plan"		
2016	Låpsley	Long Way Home	"Love Is Blind"	Låpsley, Rodaidh McDonald, Charlie Hugall	
2017	DNCE	A Very ROC Christmas	"Christmas Without You"		
2018	Youngr	This Is Not An Album	"Monsters"	Dario Younger Brigham-Bowes, Mike Spencer	
2018	Demi Lovato	Non-album single	"Sober"	M-Phazes, Tushar Apte	
2018	AJ Mitchell	Hopeful	"Girls"		
2018	Rita Ora	Phoenix	"Velvet Rope"	Jimmy Napes, Caspar	
2018	Rea Garvey	Neon	"Different World"	Andy Chatterley, Rea Garvey	
2019	Maisie Peters	Non-album single	"Stay Young"	Sam de Jong	
2019	Alaina Castillo	antisocial butterfly	"back to you"		
2019	Alaina Castillo	antisocial butterfly	"no importa"		
2019	Alaina Castillo	antisocial butterfly	"i don't think i love you anymore"		
2019	Alaina Castillo	antisocial butterfly	"mentiras"		
2019	Alaina Castillo	antisocial butterfly	"papacito"		
2019	AJ Mitchell	Slow Dance	"Talk So Much"		
2019	AJ Mitchell	Slow Dance	"Out My Mind"		
2019	AJ Mitchell	Non-album single	"Unstoppable"		
2019	Camila Cabello	Romance	"This Love"	Rush Hr	
2020	Alaina Castillo	Non-album single	"valentine's day"		
2020	Alaina Castillo	Non-album single	"ocean waves"		
2020	Alaina Castillo	the voicenotes	"just a boy"		
2020	Alaina Castillo	the voicenotes	"pass you by"		
2020	Alaina Castillo	the voicenotes	"sad girl"		
2020	Alaina Castillo	the voicenotes	"voicenote"		
2020	Alaina Castillo	Non-album single	"tonight"		
2020	Alaina Castillo	Non-album single	"¡párate!"		
2020	Alaina Castillo	Non-album single	"wishlist"		
2021	Nessa Barrett	Non-album single	"la di die" (featuring jxdn)	Leo Mellace, Travis Barker	
2021	Mary J. Blige	Non-album single	"Hourglass (from the Amazon OriginalDocumentary: Mary J. Blige's My Life)"		
2021	Alaina Castillo	parallel universe pt. 1	"pocket locket"		
2021	Alaina Castillo	parallel universe pt. 1	"down 4 u"		
2021	Alaina Castillo	parallel universe pt. 1	"parallel universe"	12welve	
2021	Alaina Castillo	parallel universe pt. 1	"stfu (i got u)"		
2021	Alaina Castillo	parallel universe pt. 1	"indica"		
2021	Alaina Castillo	parallel universe pt. 1	"make it rain"		
2021	Alaina Castillo	parallel universe pt. 1	"tėn cømmåndmėnts"		
2021	Alaina Castillo	Non-album single	"wish you were here"		
2021	Alaina Castillo	Non-album single	"lips (Original Music from The L Word: Generation Q)"	Boylord	
2021	Natti Natasha	Nattividad	"Imposible Amor" (with Maluma)	Édgar Barrera	
2021	Ed Sheeran	=	"The Joker And The Queen" (solo or featuring Taylor Swift)	Johnny McDaid, Fred Gibson, Ed Sheeran	
2022	Alec Benjamin	(Un)Commentary	"Nancy Got A Haircut"		
2022	Alaina Castillo	fantasies	"sad girls always finish first"		
2022	Alaina Castillo	fantasies	"tell the one u love"		
2022	Alaina Castillo	fantasies	"party in my head (ur not invited)"		
2022	Alaina Castillo	fantasies	"get better"		
2022	Alaina Castillo	fantasies	"call me when ur lonely"		
2022	Alaina Castillo	fantasies	"fantasies"		
2022	Francis Karel	Handle with Care	"Dancing on Your Own"	Harry O'Reily	
2023	Alaina Castillo	malos hábitos	"éxtasis"	Burns	
2023	Alaina Castillo	malos hábitos	"luna de miel"		
2023	Alaina Castillo	malos hábitos	"hookah envenena"		
2023	Alaina Castillo	malos hábitos	"sabateo"		
2023	Alaina Castillo	malos hábitos	"me conquistaste"	Tim Suby	
2023	Alaina Castillo	Non-album single	"running water"		
2023	Fabio Guerra	Non-album single	"AY! Que Dolor."		
2023	Benson Boone	Pulse	"Little Runaway"	Mark Schick, Jason Evigan	
2024	Fabio Guerra	Non-album single	"Dos Mujeres a la Vez"		
2024	LAY	STEP	"Step"	David Stewart, Jessica Agombar	
2024	Alaina Castillo	Non-album single	"crush"		
2024	Alaina Castillo	Non-album single	"starz"		
2024	Alaina Castillo	Non-album single	"pretty little thing"		
2025	Alaina Castillo	Non-album single	"last night"		

== Awards and nominations ==
Award	Year	Recipient(s) and nominee(s)	Category	Result	Ref(s).
BMI Pop Awards	2020	"Someone You Loved"	Award Winning Songs	Won	
BMI London Awards	2020	"Someone You Loved"	Award Winning Songs	Won	
BMI London Awards	2022	"Someone You Loved"	Award Winning Songs	Won	
BMI London Awards	2023	"Middle of the Night"	Award Winning Songs	Won	
Brit Awards	2020	"Someone You Loved"	Song of the Year	Won	
Grammy Awards	2020	"Someone You Loved"	Song of the Year	Nominated	
Ivor Novello Awards	2021	"Someone You Loved"	Most Performed Work	Nominated	
