= Sounds Like Friday Night =

- Genre: Music
- Presented by: Greg James; Dotty
- Opening theme: "Sounds Like Friday Night"
- Composer: Royal Blood
- Country of origin: United Kingdom
- Original language: English
- No. of series: 2
- No. of episodes: 11

Production
- Executive producers: Gabe Turner; Suzi Aplin; Paul Wright
- Producer: Toby Brack
- Production location: Television Centre
- Running time: 30 minutes
- Production companies: Fulwell 73; BBC Music

Original release
- Network: BBC One
- Release: 27 October 2017 – 4 May 2018

Sounds Like Friday Night is a music entertainment programme that began airing on BBC One in the United Kingdom from 27 October 2017. Presented by broadcaster Greg James and rapper A.Dot (credited as Dotty), the programme features both emerging and established music acts, alongside comedy sketches involving some of the artists who appear on the show.

On 12 October 2017, the BBC confirmed that the first edition of Sounds Like Friday Night would be broadcast on Friday 27 October, Jason Derulo co-presenting the first edition, as well as performing on that date. Other artists who appeared on the first series included Liam Payne, Kasabian, Royal Blood and Rag'n'Bone Man. Guest hosts have included: Liam Payne, Demi Lovato, Craig David, Paloma Faith and Dua Lipa. The show has seen performances from Dizzee Rascal, Rita Ora and Charlie Puth amongst many others. Liam Gallagher pulled out of Episode 2 and was replaced by Dizzee Rascal (who performed "Bop n' Keep it Dippin'"). Loyle Carner was due to appear on the third episode but pulled out due to illness – he was replaced by Plan B.

On 8 December 2017, the BBC confirmed that the show will be returning for a second series in April 2018, where both Dotty and James would reprise their roles as hosts. The first episode aired on 6 April on BBC One. Guests for this series include Years & Years, George Ezra and The Vaccines.

== Production ==
Although similarly titled to a BBC music programme presented by Leo Sayer broadcast in 1978, called Sounds Like Friday: Leo Sayer, the new programme was first devised as an idea in 2014. BBC News suggested its format will be similar to the one-off special Adele at the BBC, which aired in 2015, and featured singer Adele taking part in a prank in which she pretended to impersonate herself. Sounds Like Friday Night will initially air for six weeks, and will be the first regular mainstream primetime music programme to air on the BBC since Top of the Pops was axed in 2006. The shows are broadcast live from TC1, the largest studio in the newly renovated BBC Television Centre, in London.

== Episodes ==
=== Series 1 ===
The first series ran for six episodes between 27 October 2017 and 8 December 2017.

Episode	Air date	Guest host	Performances
1	27 October 2017	Jason Derulo	Jason Derulo – "If I'm Lucky"/"Want to Want Me" (acoustic); Charlie Puth – "How Long"; Jessie Ware – "Alone"
2	3 November 2017	Liam Payne	Liam Payne – "Bedroom Floor"/"What About Us"; Dizzee Rascal – "Bop N Keep It Dippin"; London Grammar – "Hell to the Liars"; Mabel feat. Kojo Funds – "Finders Keepers"
3	10 November 2017	Demi Lovato	Demi Lovato – "Instruction" (with Jax Jones & Stefflon Don)/"Tell Me You Love Me"; Stereophonics – "Taken a Tumble"; Plan B – "Heartbeat"; Stefflon Don – "Hurtin' Me"
4	24 November 2017	Craig David	Craig David – "Heartline"/"I Know You" (with Dan Smith); The Killers – "The Man"; Anne-Marie – "Heavy"; Tom Grennan – "Found What I've Been Looking For"
5	1 December 2017	Paloma Faith	Paloma Faith – "Guilty"/"I'll be Gentle" (with BB Bones); Rita Ora – "Anywhere"; Royal Blood – "How Did We Get So Dark?"; Sigrid – "Strangers"
6	8 December 2017	Dua Lipa	Dua Lipa – "New Rules"/"Homesick"; Kasabian –"Ill Ray (The King)"; Rag'n'Bone Man – "As You Are"; Hurts – "Ready to Go"; Raye featuring Mr Eazi – "Decline"

=== Series 2 ===
The second series began on 6 April 2018, with 5 episodes. The 'guest host' element of the prior series was axed and there was a new item with 'Gig in a Minute' (where artists have to fit as many songs as possible into 60 seconds) for the second series. Just before the show went on air for its 3rd episode on Friday 20 April 2018, DJ and EDM pioneer Avicii died at the age of 28, so the whole studio took part in an applause to remember him.

Episode	Air Date	Performances	Gig In A Minute (Score)	Interview
1	6 April 2018	Meghan Trainor – "No Excuses"; Years & Years – "Sanctify"/"King (acoustic)" Snow Patrol – "Don't Give In"; Halsey – "Alone"	Gary Barlow (10)	Little Mix
2	13 April 2018	Lily Allen – "The Fear"/"Higher"; James Bay – "Wild Love"; Banx & Ranx & Ella Eyre feat. Yxng Bane – "Answerphone"; 5 Seconds of Summer – "Want You Back"; Sam Smith – "Pray"	Little Mix (9)	—N/a
3	20 April 2018	Shawn Mendes – "In My Blood"/"Lost in Japan"; The Vaccines – "I Can't Quit"; Jorja Smith – "Blue Lights"; Craig David – "Magic"; Charlie Puth – "Done for Me (acoustic)"	Nile Rodgers & Chic (13)	Charlie Puth
4	27 April 2018	Anne-Marie – "Friends"/"2002"; George Ezra – "Shotgun"; Chvrches – "Get Out"; Niall Horan – "On the Loose"; Migos – "Stir Fry"	Jessie J (14)	Niall Horan
5	4 May 2018	Kylie Minogue – "Stop Me from Falling"/"Radio On"; Florence and the Machine – "Hunger"; Naughty Boy feat. Ray BLK and Wyclef Jean – "All or Nothing"; The Streets – "Turn the Page"; Sigala & Paloma Faith – "Lullaby"	James Dean Bradfield (10)	David Guetta
