= Dancing Alone =

2018 song by Axwell & Ingrosso featuring Romans

Single by Axwell & Ingrosso featuring Romans
- Released: 29 June 2018
- Genre: Pop; house
- Length: 4:13
- Label: UMG Recordings
- Songwriter(s): Sam Roman; Sebastian Ingrosso; Axel Hedfors; Richard Zastenker
- Producer(s): Sebastian Ingrosso; Axel Hedfors

Axwell & Ingrosso singles chronology
| "Dreamer" (2017) | "Dancing Alone" (2018) |

Music video
- "Dancing Alone" on YouTube

"Dancing Alone" is a song by Swedish dance music duo Axwell & Ingrosso featuring English singer-songwriter RØMANS. It was released on 29 June 2018. The song was written by Axwell, Sebastian Ingrosso, Axel Hedfors, RØMANS and Richard Zastenker.

== Track listing ==
Digital download
| No. | Title | Length |
|---|---|---|
| 1. | "Dancing Alone" | 4:13 |

Digital download – Remixes
| No. | Title | Length |
|---|---|---|
| 1. | "Dancing Alone" (Club Mix) | 4:11 |
| 2. | "Dancing Alone" (Brohug Extended Mix) | 5:14 |
| 3. | "Dancing Alone" (Minds&Machines Extended Remix) | 4:42 |
| 4. | "Dancing Alone" (CYA Extended Remix) | 6:14 |

== Charts ==
=== Weekly charts ===
Weekly chart performance for "Dancing Alone"
| Chart (2018) | Peak position |
|---|---|
| Belgium (Ultratip Bubbling Under Flanders) | 41 |
| Belgium (Ultratip Bubbling Under Wallonia) | 19 |
| Sweden (Sverigetopplistan) | 29 |
| US Dance Club Songs (Billboard) | 4 |
| US Hot Dance/Electronic Songs (Billboard) | 27 |

=== Year-end charts ===
Year-end chart performance for "Dancing Alone"
| Chart (2018) | Position |
|---|---|
| US Hot Dance/Electronic Songs (Billboard) | 89 |

== Certifications ==
Certifications for "Dancing Alone"
| Region | Certification | Certified units/sales |
Streaming
| Sweden (GLF) | Gold | 4,000,000^{†} |
^{†} Streaming-only figures based on certification alone.
