= I Know You (Craig David song) =

Single by Craig David featuring Bastille

from the album The Time Is Now
- Released: 23 November 2017
- Genre: R&B; electropop; dance-pop
- Length: 3:36
- Label: Insanity; Sony
- Songwriters: Craig David; Dan Smith; Fraser Thorneycroft-Smith; Helen "Carmen Reece" Culver
- Producer: Fraser T Smith

Craig David singles chronology
"Heartline" (2017)	"I Know You" (2017)	"Magic" (2018)

Bastille singles chronology
"World Gone Mad" (2017)	"I Know You" (2017)	"Quarter Past Midnight" (2018)

Music video
- "I Know You" on YouTube

"I Know You" is a song by British singer Craig David, featuring the British indie pop band Bastille. It was written by David, Dan Smith, Fraser Thorneycroft-Smith, and Helen "Carmen Reece" Culver for his seventh studio album, The Time Is Now (2018), with production helmed by Thorneycroft-Smith under his pseudonyme Fraser T Smith. The song was released on 23 November 2017, as the second single from the album and reached number five on the UK Singles Chart.

== Background ==
"I Know You" is the first collaboration between David and Bastille. The official audio for the song was released on David's official YouTube account on 23 November 2017.

== Music video ==
The music video for the song first premiered on 4 January 2018 on NME's official website, before later being uploaded to YouTube. It features David and Smith (of Bastille) at a party. Another David song, "For the Gram" can be heard at the beginning in the background. Directed by Alex Southam, "I Know You" video finds David at a basement party where he takes shots, sings karaoke and just enjoys moments with his friends.

== Live performances ==
David and Smith performed the song live for the first time on Sounds Like Friday Night on 24 November 2017 and later performed it on the Strictly Come Dancing results show on 10 December 2017 and the Top of the Pops New Year's Eve special on 31 December 2017. David performed the song solo on The Last Leg on 26 January 2018.

== Track listing ==
All tracks written by Craig David, Dan Smith, Fraser T Smith, and Helen "Carmen Reece" Culver.

Digital download
No.	Title	Producer(s)	Length
1.	"I Know You" (featuring Bastille)	Fraser T Smith	3:36

Remixes EP
No.	Title	Producer(s)	Length
1.	"I Know You" (featuring Bastille) (Canto Remix)	Smith; Canto^{[a]}	3:31
2.	"I Know You" (featuring Bastille) (Sobr Remix)	Smith; Sobr^{[a]}	3:33
3.	"I Know You" (featuring Bastille) (Vigiland Remix)	Smith; Vigiland^{[a]}	3:03
4.	"I Know You" (featuring Bastille) (Sultan & Shepard Remix)	Smith; Sultan & Shepard^{[a]}	3:39

Notes

- ^{^[a]} signifies an additional producer

== Charts ==
=== Weekly charts ===
Weekly chart performance for "I Know You"
Chart (2017–18)	Peak position
Belgium (Ultratip Bubbling Under Flanders)	16
Croatia (HRT)	81
Euro Digital Song Sales (Billboard)	5
Germany (GfK)	92
Hungary (Single Top 40)	31
Ireland (IRMA)	30
Scotland Singles (OCC)	2
Switzerland (Schweizer Hitparade)	65
UK Singles (OCC)	5
US Dance Club Songs (Billboard)	12

=== Year-end charts ===
Year-end chart performance for "I Know You"
Chart (2018)	Position
UK Singles (OCC)	83

== Certifications ==
Certifications of "I Know You"
Region	Certification	Certified units/sales
United Kingdom (BPI)	Platinum	600,000^{‡}
^{‡} Sales+streaming figures based on certification alone.

== Release history ==
Release history and formats for "I Know You"
Region	Date	Format(s)	Label	Ref.
United Kingdom	23 November 2017	Digital download	Insanity; Sony	
