= Ends & Begins =

Studio album by Labrinth
- Released: 28 April 2023
- Genre: R&B; electropop
- Length: 28:48
- Label: Columbia
- Producer: Labrinth; Finneas; Fred Again; David Jones; Alex Elliott

Labrinth chronology
Euphoria Season 2 Official Score (From the HBO Original Series) (2022)	Ends & Begins (2023)	Cosmic Opera: Act I (2026)

Singles from Ends & Begins
- 1. "Kill for Your Love" Released: 9 September 2022; 2. "Never Felt So Alone" Released: 7 April 2023

Ends & Begins is the third solo studio album by English singer-songwriter Labrinth, released on 28 April 2023 by Columbia Records. It was originally scheduled for release on 21 October 2022. It marks his first studio album since Imagination & the Misfit Kid (2019).

The album was described as being "sci-fi love songs for my beloved" by Labrinth.

== Recording, release and promotion ==
The album was supported by two official singles: "Kill for Your Love", released on 9 September 2022, and "Never Felt So Alone", which was released on 7 April 2023, featuring uncredited vocals from American singer Billie Eilish.

The song "Never Felt So Alone" was featured in the second season of HBO teen drama Euphoria, for which Labrinth composes the score and soundtrack. However, it was not released as part of the accompanying soundtrack album.

== Reception ==
For NPR's All Songs Considered, critics Ayana Contreras, Christina Lee, Hazel Cills, and Robin Hilton highlighted this album as one of the best releases of the week.

== Track listing ==
All tracks are written and produced by Timothy McKenzie, except where noted.

Ends & Begins track listing
No.	Title	Writer(s)	Producer(s)	Length
1.	"The Feels"	Timothy McKenzie; Muzhda Zemar		3:17
2.	"Kill for Your Love"			3:12
3.	"Everything"	McKenzie; Zendaya		2:16
4.	"Covering"	McKenzie; Zemar		3:13
5.	"A Turn of Events"			1:53
6.	"100 Miles an Hour"			3:01
7.	"Never Felt So Alone"	McKenzie; Aether Zemar-McKenzie; Nula Zemar-McKenzie; Sam Roman; Fred Gibson; Billie Eilish O'Connell; Finneas O'Connell	Labrinth; Finneas; Fred; David Jones; Alex Elliott	2:40
8.	"Only Way Is Up"			3:16
9.	"Power Couple"	McKenzie; Zemar		2:30
10.	"Ends & Begins"			3:31
Total length:				28:48

Notes

- "The Feels" features vocals by Zendaya
- "Never Felt So Alone" features vocals by Billie Eilish

== Charts ==
Chart performance for Ends & Begins
Chart (2023)	Peak position
Finnish Albums (Suomen virallinen lista)	50
Lithuanian Albums (AGATA)	19
Norwegian Albums (VG-lista)	8
Polish Albums (ZPAV)	82
Swiss Albums (Schweizer Hitparade)	52
UK Album Downloads (OCC)	78
US Billboard 200	144

== Release history ==
Release history and formats for Ends & Begins
Region	Date	Format(s)	Ref.
Various	28 April 2023	Digital download; streaming	
