= Never Felt So Alone =

Single by Labrinth

from the album Ends & Begins
- Released: 7 April 2023
- Genre: Electropop
- Length: 2:40
- Label: Columbia
- Songwriters: Labrinth; Aether Zemar-McKenzie; Nula Zemar-McKenzie; Sam Roman; Fred Gibson; Billie Eilish O'Connell; Finneas O'Connell
- Producers: Labrinth; Finneas; Fred; David Jones; Alex Elliott

Labrinth singles chronology
"Iridium" (2022)	"Never Felt So Alone" (2023)	"Incredible" (2024)

"Never Felt So Alone" is a song by British singer-songwriter Labrinth featuring uncredited vocals from American singer-songwriter Billie Eilish. It was featured in the first season of Euphoria on HBO. It was released with a music video by Columbia Records as the second single from Labrinth's third studio album, Ends & Begins, on 7 April 2023.

The song received a nomination for Best Pop Duo/Group Performance at the 66th Annual Grammy Awards.

== Background and release ==
"Never Felt So Alone" was featured throughout both the first and second season of HBO teen drama Euphoria, for which Labrinth composes the score and soundtrack. However, it was not released as part of the accompanying soundtrack album, Euphoria Season 1 (An HBO Original Series Soundtrack). In December 2022, Labrinth joined Billie Eilish during her concert at the Kia Forum in Los Angeles to perform the song, alongside "Mount Everest", which also featured in the season 2 soundtrack.

Labrinth began teasing the release of the song via social media at the end of March 2023. Following a teaser video, also posted by Labrinth, fans speculated that Eilish would be featured on the track, though no official confirmation was made. The song, featuring uncredited vocals from Eilish, and a music video, starring both artists, were released on 7 April 2023. Shortly after its release, Eilish joined Labrinth for a live performance at the 2023 Coachella Valley Music and Arts Festival.

== Personnel ==
Credits adapted from Tidal.

- Labrinth – songwriting, production, recording engineering
- Finneas O'Connell – songwriting, production
- Billie Eilish O'Connell – songwriting, uncredited vocals
- Fred Gibson – songwriting, production
- David Jones – production
- Alex Elliott – production
- Sam Roman – songwriting
- Aether Zemar-McKenzie – songwriting
- Nula Zemar-McKenzie – songwriting
- Matt Wolach – assistant engineering
- Mark "Spike" Stent – mixing engineering
- Randy Merrill – mastering engineering

== Charts ==
Chart performance for "Never Felt So Alone"
Chart (2023–2024)	Peak position
Australia (ARIA)	28
Austria (Ö3 Austria Top 40)	45
Canada Hot 100 (Billboard)	33
Canada CHR/Top 40 (Billboard)	50
Czech Republic Singles Digital (ČNS IFPI)	48
Global 200 (Billboard)	50
Ireland (IRMA)	17
Latvia (LAIPA)	6
Lithuania (AGATA)	15
Netherlands (Single Top 100)	60
New Zealand (Recorded Music NZ)	13
Norway (VG-lista)	39
Poland (Polish Streaming Top 100)	29
Portugal (AFP)	127
Slovakia Singles Digital (ČNS IFPI)	47
Sweden Heatseeker (Sverigetopplistan)	3
Switzerland (Schweizer Hitparade)	65
UK Singles (Official Charts)	33
US Billboard Hot 100	62
US Pop Airplay (Billboard)	36

== Certifications ==
Certifications for "Never Felt So Alone"
Region	Certification	Certified units/sales
Australia (ARIA)	Gold	35,000^{‡}
France (SNEP)	Gold	100,000^{‡}
New Zealand (RMNZ)	Platinum	30,000^{‡}
Poland (ZPAV)	Gold	25,000^{‡}
United Kingdom (BPI)	Silver	200,000^{‡}
United States (RIAA)	Platinum	1,000,000^{‡}
^{‡} Sales+streaming figures based on certification alone.

== Release history ==
Release history and formats for "Never Felt So Alone"
Region	Date	Format	Label	Ref.
Various	7 April 2023	Digital download; streaming	Columbia	
