= La Di Die =

2021 single by Nessa Barrett featuring Jxdn

Single by Nessa Barrett featuring Jxdn
- Released: February 19, 2021
- Genre: Pop rock; pop-punk
- Length: 3:15
- Label: Warner
- Songwriters: Nessa Barrett; Elizabeth Lowell Boland; Jaden Hossler; Leo Mellace; Megan Bülow; Sam Roman; Travis Barker
- Producers: Leo Mellace; Sam Roman; Travis Barker

Nessa Barrett singles chronology
"If U Love Me" (2020)	"La Di Die" (2021)	"I'm Dead" (2021)

Jxdn singles chronology
"This Ain't a Scene" (2021)	"La Di Die" (2021)	"I'm Dead" (2021)

Music video
- "La Di Die" on YouTube

"La Di Die" (stylized in all lowercase) is a song by American singer-songwriter Nessa Barrett featuring American singer-songwriter Jxdn. It was released on February 19, 2021, via Warner Records. The song was written by Barrett, Jxdn, Lowell, Bülow, Leo Mellace, Sam Roman and Travis Barker, and produced by Mellace, Roman and Barker.

== Background and content ==
Barrett explained in a press release: "'La Di Die' touches on how fame is dramatized and something most people wish for, when in reality, it's a dark and evil place. It was cool working with jxdn, not only is he my friend but a dope artist. He really helped make this song come to life!". Then Jxdn supplemented: "For me, this song represents that sometimes the hardest situation is the one that seems perfect. Don't ever be afraid to let people know you aren't where you wanna be. Set a goal, find a dream and make those reality. Live for others while being yourself; don't live for yourself while being like others".

== Critical reception ==
Warner Music Australia described the song as "[f]using warm acoustic guitar and icy 808s, it builds towards Nessa's hypnotic promise 'La da di oh la di da, gonna be a superstar'. Jxdn pulls up with an instantly unforgettable melody as their voices seamlessly entwine."

== Live performance ==
On April 7, 2021, Barrett and Jxdn performed the song on Jimmy Kimmel Live! Five days later, they performed the song on The Ellen DeGeneres Show.

== Credits and personnel ==
Credits adapted from AllMusic.

- Alex Anders – recording
- Travis Barker – composer, producer
- Nessa Barrett – composer, primary Artist, vocals
- Elizabeth Lowell Boland – composer
- Bülow – composer
- Davide Cinci – recording
- Chris Galland – mixing engineer
- John Greenham – mastering
- Kevin Gruft – recording
- Jxdn – composer, featured artist
- Jeremie Inhaber – mixing
- Manny Marroquin – mixing
- Leo Mellace – composer, producer, recording
- Zach Pereyra – mixing engineer
- Sam Roman – composer, producer
- Anthony Vilchis – mixing engineer

== Charts ==
=== Weekly charts ===
Weekly chart performance for "La Di Die"
Chart (2021–2023)	Peak position
Belarus Airplay (TopHit)	29
CIS Airplay (TopHit)	8
Czech Republic (Rádio – Top 100)	59
Ireland (IRMA)	45
Kazakhstan Airplay (TopHit)	58
New Zealand Hot Singles (RMNZ)	9
Russia Airplay (TopHit)	2
Ukraine Airplay (TopHit)	169
US Hot Rock & Alternative Songs (Billboard)	11
US Pop Airplay (Billboard)	30
US Rock & Alternative Airplay (Billboard)	21

=== Monthly charts ===
Monthly chart performance for "La Di Die"
Chart (2021–2023)	Peak position
Belarus Airplay (TopHit)	33
CIS Airplay (TopHit)	8
Czech Republic (Rádio Top 100)	74
Kazakhstan Airplay (TopHit)	73
Russia Airplay (TopHit)	6

=== Year-end charts ===
2021 year-end chart performance for "La Di Die"
Chart (2021)	Position
CIS Airplay (TopHit)	9
Russia Airplay (TopHit)	4
US Hot Rock & Alternative Songs (Billboard)	37

2022 year-end chart performance for "La Di Die"
Chart (2022)	Position
CIS Airplay (TopHit)	54
Russia Airplay (TopHit)	37

2023 year-end chart performance for "La Di Die"
Chart (2023)	Position
Belarus Airplay (TopHit)	107

2025 year-end chart performance for "La Di Die"
Chart (2025)	Position
Belarus Airplay (TopHit)	185

=== Decade-end charts ===
20s Decade-end chart performance for "La Di Die"
Chart (2020–2025)	Position
Belarus Airplay (TopHit)	28
CIS Airplay (TopHit)	44
Kazakhstan Airplay (TopHit)	105
Russia Airplay (TopHit)	6

== Certifications ==
Region	Certification	Certified units/sales
United States (RIAA)	Gold	500,000^{‡}
Canada (Music Canada)	Gold	40,000^{‡}
^{‡} Sales+streaming figures based on certification alone.

== Release history ==
Release history for "La Di Die"
Region	Date	Format	Label	Ref.
Various	February 19, 2021	Digital download; streaming	Warner	
United States	March 9, 2021	Alternative radio	Warner	
United States	April 13, 2021	Contemporary hit radio	Warner	
