= Sober (Demi Lovato song) =

2018 single by Demi Lovato

Single by Demi Lovato
- Released: June 21, 2018
- Recorded: May 2018
- Length: 3:17
- Label: Island; Hollywood; Safehouse
- Songwriter(s): Demi Lovato; Mark Landon; Tushar Apte; Sam Roman
- Producer(s): M-Phazes; Tushar Apte; Romans

Demi Lovato singles chronology
"Solo" (2018)	"Sober" (2018)	"Anyone" (2020)

Lyric video
- "Sober" on YouTube

"Sober" is a song by American singer Demi Lovato. It was initially released exclusively to music streaming services through Island, Hollywood and Safehouse Records on June 21, 2018, and was made available to iTunes on the same day. Lovato revealed in the song that she had relapsed after six years of sobriety. A month after the song's release, Lovato was hospitalized due to an overdose.

Commercially, the song reached the top 40 in Ireland, Portugal and Hungary, and received certifications in seven countries.

== Recording ==
The track was written and recorded during the 2018 Bali Invitational songwriting camp. Lovato set up a house with songwriters Romans, Apte and Landon in three writing rooms. "I feel like we created such a safe place for that song to happen and she was so brutally honest about everything," revealed Apte in an interview.

== Release and promotion ==
"Sober" premiered on June 21, 2018, and was released commercially for digital download at the same time. The lyric video begins with various clips of Lovato, including one where she is holding a wine glass, followed by footage of an ambulance. In an Instagram post, the singer teased the track with a clip of a lyric video and a short caption that read, "My truth."

== Live performances ==
Lovato first performed the song during her show at Rock in Rio in Lisbon, on June 24, 2018. She subsequently performed the song during the Tell Me You Love Me World Tour after "Warrior" was performed, during the shows in London and Birmingham. An orchestral version of the song was arranged and directed by the composer Alfredo Sirica.

== Credits and personnel ==
Credits adapted from Qobuz.

- Tushar Apte – producer, composer, lyricist
- Mitch Allan – vocal producer, engineer
- William Binderup – assistant mixer
- Demi Lovato – composer, lyricist
- M-Phazes (Mark Landon) – producer, composer, lyricist
- Erik Madrid – mixer
- Rafe Noonan – assistant engineer
- Romans (Sam Roman) – keyboards, programmer, composer, lyricist, producer, background vocalist

== Charts ==
Weekly chart performance for "Sober"
Chart (2018)	Peak position
Australia (ARIA)	50
Canada (Canadian Hot 100)	48
Czech Republic (Singles Digitál Top 100)	74
France (SNEP)	90
Greece Digital Singles (IFPI Greece)	52
Hungary (Single Top 40)	20
Ireland (IRMA)	34
Italy (Musica e dischi)	33
New Zealand Heatseekers (RMNZ)	1
Portugal (AFP)	29
Scotland (OCC)	24
Slovakia (Singles Digitál Top 100)	52
Sweden (Sverigetopplistan)	83
Switzerland (Schweizer Hitparade)	61
UK Singles (OCC)	63
US Billboard Hot 100	47

== Certifications ==
Certifications and sales for "Sober"
Region	Certification	Certified units/sales
Australia (ARIA)	Platinum	70,000^{‡}
Brazil (Pro-Música Brasil)	3× Platinum	120,000^{‡}
Denmark (IFPI Danmark)	Gold	45,000^{‡}
New Zealand (RMNZ)	Gold	15,000^{‡}
Portugal (AFP)	Gold	5,000^{‡}
United Kingdom (BPI)	Silver	200,000^{‡}
United States (RIAA)	Gold	500,000^{‡}
^{‡} Sales+streaming figures based on certification alone.
