= Anyone (Demi Lovato song) =

2020 single by Demi Lovato

Single by Demi Lovato

from the album Dancing with the Devil... the Art of Starting Over
- Released: January 26, 2020
- Recorded: July 20, 2018
- Length: 3:48
- Label: Island; Hollywood
- Songwriters: Demi Lovato; Bibi Bourelly; Eyelar Mirzazadeh; Jay Mooncie; Sam Roman; Dayyon Alexander
- Producer: Dayyon Alexander

Demi Lovato singles chronology
"Sober" (2018)	"Anyone" (2020)	"I Love Me" (2020)

Alternate cover
- Live from the 62nd Grammy Awards cover art

Lyric video
- "Anyone" on YouTube

"Anyone" is a song by American singer Demi Lovato. It was released on January 26, 2020, through Island Records and Hollywood Records as the lead single from her seventh studio album Dancing with the Devil... the Art of Starting Over. She performed it at the 62nd Annual Grammy Awards on the same day, her first performance since suffering a near-fatal drug overdose in July 2018. That same day, it was made available for purchase and streaming. "Anyone" was recorded four days before Lovato's overdose. She wrote the song with Bibi Bourelly, Eyelar Mirzazadeh, Jay Mooncie, Sam Roman, and its producer Dayyon Alexander.

Music critics praised Lovato's Grammy performance of "Anyone" and her vulnerability in the song given the context of her struggles with addiction and depression. The song debuted at number 34 on the Billboard Hot 100, and became her first number one on the Digital Songs chart. The song also entered the top 20 in Scotland and the top 30 in Hungary. On February 6, 2020, the live performance of the track was released onto streaming services. The song was nominated for a Guild of Music Supervisors Award in the Best Song Written and/or Recorded for Television category.

== Background and composition ==
Lovato recorded "Anyone" in Montana, after setting a studio camp to write songs for an album project. She said, "At the time when I was recording it, I almost listened back and heard these lyrics as a cry for help [...] I even think that I was recording it in a state of mind where I felt like I was okay, but clearly I wasn't". Four days after the track had been recorded, on July 24, 2018, Lovato suffered an overdose and was hospitalized for two weeks. Afterwards, Lovato completed a three-month stay at a rehabilitation center in treatment for her substance abuse. While in the hospital, she recalled "hearing back the songs I had just recorded" and upon hearing "Anyone", thinking "If there's ever a moment where I get to come back from this, I want to sing this song". Lovato later explained in regard to her uncertainty on whether she would be able to return following the drug-related overdose, that "It was a general thought. We didn't know what was going to happen. We didn't know how healthy I would be when I left. It was a scary time in my life, for sure." Nevertheless, Lovato says when she crafted "Anyone", she put her "heart and soul" into the song.

Lovato first revealed the title of the track during an interview with Zane Lowe on Apple Music's Beats 1 on January 24, 2020, where she announced she would perform it at the 62nd Grammy Awards.

Olivia Truffaut-Wong of Bustle compared "Anyone" with "Skyscraper" (2011), another Lovato song that was also deemed as her musical comeback following her stint at a treatment center in 2010 for issues with bulimia and self-harm. Bryan Rolli of Forbes opined the lyrics talk about the singer's "feelings of isolation and anguish", as exemplified in the chorus, "Anyone, please send me anyone / Lord, is there anyone? / I need someone". Lovato described the song in her interview with Zane Lowe as a "cry for help" after the release of her song "Sober", a song that had been written months prior and which had failed to result in meaningful change for Lovato in regard to her addiction and mental health: "I almost listen back and hear these lyrics as a cry for help", she said. "You kind of listen back to it and you kind of think, how did nobody listen to this song and think, 'Let's help this girl'. I even think that I was recording it in a state of mind where I felt like I was okay, but clearly I wasn't. And I even listened back to it and I'm like, 'Gosh, I wish I could go back in time and help that version of myself'".

In regard to the opening lyrics of the song "I tried to talk to my piano / I tried to talk to my guitar", Lovato has interpreted the lyrics to convey the futility of music as a coping mechanism during the time when she was struggling, saying "There's only so much that music can do before you have to take responsibility and you have to take the initiative to get the help that you need". She also said that "I didn't spend a lot of time perfecting it, just because it isn't... if you were to hear anything, like doubles, or if it's over-produced, it would take away from the emotion of the song, so I wanted to keep it very raw." Further, Lovato confirmed that she did not vocally re-record any parts of the song following when the song was recorded in 2018, and instead kept the original vocal take, because she realized it was "magical capturing that vocal of that song shortly before everything had happened."

== Live performances ==
On January 14, 2020, the Recording Academy announced on social media that Lovato would perform at the 62nd Grammy Awards. Lovato confirmed the news on her Instagram account, stating "I told you the next time you'd hear from me I'd be singing". Publications such as Billboard and Rolling Stone commented it would be her first live performance in nearly two years, following her overdose in July 2018. Ten days later, Lovato announced during an interview with Zane Lowe on Apple Music's Beats 1 that she would perform "Anyone". About the performance, she said, "I just want to go up there and tell my story. And I have three minutes to do so. So I'm just going to do the best that I can. And it's only telling a fraction of my story, but it's still a little bit, and it's enough to kind of show the world where I've been."

Lovato performed "Anyone" at the 62nd Grammy Awards ceremony that took place at the Staples Center in Los Angeles on January 26, 2020, after being introduced by film director Greta Gerwig. She wore a white dress and was accompanied by a pianist. While singing the opening lyrics, her voice cracked, stopping the performance for a brief moment and started to sing the song over again. She continued to perform the track, crying at some points and singing the lines "Is there anyone? / I need someone" in a high vocal register. Lovato received a standing ovation from the audience when she finished the song. Following the performance, "Anyone" was made available for digital download as well as on streaming services, and its lyric video was released to YouTube. Claire Shaffer and Elias Leight of Rolling Stone noted that the performance went "smoothly" after Lovato resumed to sing again, while Sandra Gonzalez praised the singer's voice, saying she "delivered a powerful vocal performance". Billboard's Bianca Gracie also commended Lovato's vocal register, writing that "Lovato's voice was powerful as she belted the high notes, singing every note with passion". The performance was the most-tweeted-about moment of the award ceremony and also one of the most-talked-about moments on Facebook.

Lovato later revealed in an interview with Andy Cohen on SiriusXM's Radio Andy show that she had cried during the performance because "I looked at the front row and I saw my mom and my two sisters, and I think having... seeing them in the front row just overwhelmed me with emotion," and also that she remembered herself "back in that hospital bed listening to that song, on little speakers in the ICU." Nevertheless, in response to the outpouring of love and support from peers and fans on social media following the live performance, Lovato said she is "grateful that the response has been so awesome" and thinks that "people are able to hear that song for what it is, which is a very emotional plea for anyone else listening."

On August 24, 2024, Lovato performed "Anyone", for the first time in years, at the Festival Hera HSBC in Mexico. The performance was described by the Los Angeles Times as one of the most powerful moments of the night. On April 28, 2026, Lovato performed the song at Little Caesars Arena as part of surprise song from her It's Not That Deep Tour.

== Critical reception ==
"Anyone" received critical acclaim. The New York Times hailed Lovato as having "emerged in her late teenage years as a pop star with a big voice and unexpected edge" and that "Anyone" is a "pensive eruption, a harrowing peal" that "moves slowly and determinedly, and not totally steadily, which is the point— recovery is not a straight line. The pain here is palpable, and Lovato wields it like a weapon and a shield. She's a torch singer for our modern era, which asks too much of those too young, and doesn't stop until it breaks them."

Writing for The Atlantic, Spencer Kornhaber praised Lovato's lyrical composition and structure in "Anyone": "The lyrics are a desperate tumble, a litany of failed attempts at finding relief. 'I tried to talk to my piano, I tried to talk to my guitar,' she begins. 'Talked to my imagination / Confided into alcohol / I tried and tried and tried some more / Told secrets 'til my voice was sore.' She goes on, singing that she felt dumb for praying, that her wishes upon shooting stars were for naught, that even with 'a hundred million stories / and a hundred million songs / I feel stupid when I sing / Nobody's listening to me.'" Kornhaber also noted that Lovato in "Anyone" is remarkable in how it represents hopelessness despite vulnerability: "Who admits [I feel stupid when I sing]? Certainly not stars like Lovato, who sell the idea of music as a self-help tool and a weapon of domination. When she shows weakness, it is to grow stronger. But Lovato is saying vulnerability has gotten her nowhere. Fans and sobriety coaches and faith in God and music itself—they were no recourse in her worst moment. She is singing instead in the language of hopelessness, an emotion often intrinsic to addiction and depression."

Jason Lipshutz of Billboard referred to the song as a "purposefully somber track that stands out as one of her most accomplished ballads, carrying the vulnerability of songs like 'Skyscraper' and 'Stone Cold' into darker territory. 'I feel stupid when I sing / Nobody's listening to me / Nobody's listening,' Lovato asserts as the piano trudges forward; the words, of course, are coming from one of the brightest pop stars of the past decade, and reflect a deeply damaged self-confidence that can exist even among the greatest collection of accolades."

== Commercial performance ==
The song was released on Sunday night following Lovato's performance at the 62nd Grammy Awards. According to HeadlinePlanet, the song reached number 1 on iTunes on the all-genre US song sales chart by Monday morning. The song spent four days at number 1 on this chart. Lovato also debuted on the Spotify charts with one million streams worldwide. In the United States, "Anyone" secured an entry in the Top 50 on the Spotify charts, debuting at number 47, with 478,000 streams in one day. This entry marks the only debut on that day that reached the Top 50 on the United States Spotify charts. According to Variety, "Anyone" was the most downloaded song in the U.S. on Grammy day with over 11,500 sales on the day of the show and more than 27,000 sales within 24 hours of her performance, it was also the most streamed song with over 1.9 million streams.

In the US, "Anyone" debuted at number 34 on the Billboard Hot 100, becoming Lovato's 30th career entry and her 14th top 40 song. The song received 7.1 million U.S. streams and 1.1 million radio airplay audience impressions, and sold 41,000 downloads, the latter which enabled it to debut at the top of the Digital Song Sales chart, marking Lovato's first number one on the chart.

Internationally, the song debuted and peaked at number 14 in Scotland, while reaching number 71 in Ireland. However, overall in the United Kingdom, it debuted in the top 20 of the Download Chart. "Anyone" also debuted at number 6 on the New Zealand Hot Singles chart and at number 23 on the Australia Digital Tracks chart.

== Track listing ==
Digital download and stream

1. "Anyone" – 3:47

Digital download and stream – Live From The 62nd Grammys Awards version

1. "Anyone" (live from the 62nd Grammy Awards) – 4:34

== Credits and personnel ==
Recording and management

- Published by DDLovato Music/Universal Music Corp. (ASCAP), Tap Music Publishing Ltd., Sam Roman obo UMPG, Songs of Roc Nation Music (BMI), Sam Roman Music LLC (PRS/BMI), Arjouni Publishing/Circa 13 (ASCAP), BMG Gold Songs (ASCAP), Stellar Songs/Sony ATV

Personnel

- Demi Lovato – lead vocals, composition
- Dayyon Alexander – composition, production, keys, programming
- Romans – composition
- Bibi Bourelly – composition
- Jay Mooncie – composition
- Eyelar Mirzazadeh – composition
- Lauren D'Elia – vocal production, engineering, mixing
- Dave Kutch – mastering

Credits adapted from the liner notes of Dancing with the Devil... the Art of Starting Over.

== Charts ==
Chart (2020)	Peak position
Australia Digital Tracks (ARIA)	23
Belgium (Ultratip Bubbling Under Flanders)	33
Canada Hot 100 (Billboard)	64
France (SNEP Sales Chart)	24
Hungary (Single Top 40)	23
Ireland (IRMA)	71
Netherlands (Single Tip)	27
New Zealand Hot Singles (RMNZ)	6
Portugal (AFP)	144
Scottish Singles Sales (Official Charts)	14
UK Singles Downloads (Official Charts)	20
US Billboard Hot 100	34
US Rolling Stone Top 100	23

== Certifications ==
Certifications and sales for "Anyone"
Region	Certification	Certified units/sales
Brazil (Pro-Música Brasil)	Platinum	40,000^{‡}
United States (RIAA)	Gold	500,000^{‡}
^{‡} Sales+streaming figures based on certification alone.

== Release history ==
Region	Date	Format	Version	Label	Ref.
Various	January 26, 2020	Digital download; streaming	Original	Island; Hollywood	
Australia	January 29, 2020	Contemporary hit radio	Original	Island; Universal	
Various	February 6, 2020	Digital download; streaming	Live	The Recording Academy; Island	

== See also ==
- List of Billboard Digital Song Sales number ones of 2020
