= Cosmic Opera: Act I =

2026 studio album by Labrinth

Studio album by Labrinth
- Released: 30 January 2026
- Length: 28:01
- Label: Columbia
- Producer: Labrinth

Labrinth chronology
Ends & Begins (2023)	Cosmic Opera: Act I (2026)	Cosmic Opera: Act II (2026)

Cosmic Opera: Act I is the fourth studio album by British musician Labrinth, released by Columbia Records on 30 January 2026.

The first three singles from the album were "Orchestra", "S.W.M.F." and "Implosion".

== Critical reception ==
Rolling Stone called it "an album where Labrinth has been uncompromising in his grand vision and delivered something that sounds all the better for it."

Billboard wrote: "With his latest album, Cosmic Opera Act I, he fuses orchestral elements with his more expected futuristic production, resulting in what has been coined as a 'modern opera.'"

The Guardian called it "Moody and cinematic, songs such as Implosion and S.W.M.F., bolt expansive strings on to pounding hip-hop beats."

== Track listing ==
Cosmic Opera: Act I track listing
No.	Title	Writer(s)	Length
1.	"Something Like an Opera"	Labrinth	0:59
2.	"Debris"	Labrinth; Emily Warren	2:55
3.	"Implosion"	Labrinth; Nula Zemar-McKenzie	3:20
4.	"Into the Black Hole"	Labrinth; Zemar-McKenzie	1:59
5.	"S.W.M.F."	Labrinth; Zemar-McKenzie	3:08
6.	"God Spoke"	Labrinth	1:14
7.	"Big Bad Wolf"	Labrinth	2:53
8.	"I Keep My Promises"	Labrinth	3:04
9.	"Opera Interlude"	Labrinth	0:38
10.	"Orchestra"	Labrinth; Marie Ulven Ringheim	2:54
11.	"Still in Love with the Pain"	Labrinth; Warren	3:21
12.	"Running a Red"	Labrinth	2:16
Total length:			28:01

== Personnel ==
Credits are adapted from Tidal.

- Labrinth – performance, production (all tracks); engineering (1–7, 9–12), mixing (4, 5)
- Jonas Jalhay – mixing (1–5, 7–9, 11, 12), engineering (5, 8), additional production (5)
- Rob Kleiner – mastering (all tracks), mixing (6, 10)
- Morning Estrada – engineering (2)
- S1a0 – co-production (8, 12)
- Cass Lowe – co-production (8)

== Charts ==
Chart performance for Cosmic Opera: Act I
Chart (2026)	Peak position
US Top Classical Albums (Billboard)	3
US Top Classical Crossover Albums (Billboard)	3
