= 22 (album) =

Studio album by Craig David
- Released: 30 September 2022
- Genre: R&B
- Length: 41:13
- Label: TS5; Moor
- Producer: Mike Brainchild; Digital Farm Animals; Bloodshy; David Saint Fleur; Y3llo Koala; VodKa; Red Triangle; Toddla T; Duvall; Tom Demac; Carmen Reece; G'harah Degeddingseze

Craig David chronology
The Time Is Now (2018)	22 (2022)	Commitment (2025)

Singles from 22
- 1. "Who You Are" Released: 22 October 2021; 2. "My Heart's Been Waiting for You" Released: 15 April 2022; 3. "G Love" Released: 10 June 2022; 4. "DNA" Released: 29 July 2022

22 is the eighth studio album by English singer Craig David. It was released on 30 September 2022 through TS5 Label and Moor Records.

== Critical reception ==
Professional ratings
Review scores
Source	Rating
NME	4/5 stars
The Telegraph	3/5 stars
Rolling Stone	3.5/5 stars

Kyann-Sian Williams of NME called 22 a "nostalgia-loving [...] silky R&B revival record". She wrote that "heavily relying on the feel-good nature of classic '00s R&B, Craig David could have dangerously made a gimmicky throwback album. Yet, in a time when many UK R&B fans are crying out for great music and recognition, Craig David not only feeds that appetite but uses his platform to laud up some stars to watch too." Kate French-Morris, writing for The Telegraph, remarked that the album "isn't addled by trends, unlike its 2018 predecessor, which caught David toying with autotune and EDM drops [...] A fresh generation of ears have given him a fairer hearing and comeback success. 22 is no Born to Do It, but it at least reminds us of that album's deserved prestige."

== Chart performance ==
22 debuted at number seven on the UK Albums Chart. This marked David's sixth album to enter the top ten album. Elsewhere in the UK, the album also debuted and peaked at number one on the Independent Albums Chart, while also reaching number 2 on the UK Album Downloads, and number 4 on both the Physical Albums, and the Albums Sales Chart. 22 also debuted at number 25 on the Scottish Albums Chart.

== Track listing ==
22 track listing
No.	Title	Writer(s)	Producer(s)	Length
1.	"Teardrops"	Craig David; Negin Djafari; Michael Engmann; Jonathan Buck; Bob Robinson; Timothy Kelley	Mike Brainchild	3:52
2.	"DNA" (with Galantis)	David; Uzoechi Emenike; Lee Paul Williams; Conor Manning; Christian Karlsson; David Saint Fleur; Jordi Fluiter; Yusekae Koi; Christopher Tempest	Bloodshy; Fleur; Y3llo Koala; VodKa; Digital Farm Animals^{[a]}	2:57
3.	"Who You Are" (with MNEK)	David; Emenike; Nicholas Gale; Matthew Zara; JoJo Bailey; Rory Bennett	Digital Farm Animals	3:25
4.	"G Love" (featuring Nippa)	David; Engmann; Jordan Adebiyi	Brainchild; Digital Farm Animals	3:07
5.	"21" (featuring Isong)	David; Engmann; Samuel Isong	Brainchild	3:37
6.	"Give It All Up"	David; Djafari; George Tizzard; Richard Parkhouse	Red Triangle	3:09
7.	"Back to Basics" (featuring Gracey)	David; Grace Barker; Adrian McLeod; Thomas Mackenzie Bell	Toddla T	3:32
8.	"My Heart's Been Waiting for You" (featuring Duvall)	David; Djafari; Engmann; Nathan Duvall	Brainchild; Digital Farm Animals; Duvall; Tom Demac	3:25
9.	"What More Could I Ask For?" (featuring Wretch 32)	David; Engmann; Jermaine Scott	Brainchild	4:24
10.	"Obvious" (featuring Muni Long)	David; Sean Wander; Priscilla "Muni Long" Hamilton; Engmann	Brainchild	3:39
11.	"Gold"	David; Carmen Reece; Engmann	Brainchild	3:00
12.	"Maybe"	David; Engmann	Brainchild; PopScar^{[a]}	3:06
Total length:				41:13

Deluxe edition bonus tracks
No.	Title	Writer(s)	Producer(s)	Length
13.	"Gets Like That"	David; Wander; Engmann	Brainchild	3:57
14.	"Best of Me"	David; Reece; Engmann; Mariah Carey; Jeffrey Cohen; Shawn Carter; Shirley Ellis; Lincoln Chase; Narada Michael Walden	Brainchild	3:05
15.	"Meant to Be"	David; Engmann	Brainchild	3:45
16.	"Already Know" (featuring Kyle)	David; Engmann; Kyle Harvey	Brainchild	2:53
17.	"Yes" (with Carmen Reece)	Reece; G'harah Degeddingseze	Reece; Degeddingseze	4:10
Total length:				59:03

Super deluxe edition bonus tracks
No.	Title	Length
18.	"Used To"	2:50
19.	"Unconditional"	3:18
20.	"DNA (Part 2)"	3:50
21.	"Who You Are (Part 2)" (with MNEK)	3:48
22.	"DNA" (acoustic)	3:48
23.	"Who You Are" (stripped, with MNEK)	3:38
Total length:		80:15

Notes

- ^{^[a]} signifies an additional producer

Sample credits

- "Teardrops" samples the song "They Don't Know" as performed by Jon B. and written by Tim Kelley, Bob Robinson and Jon B.
- "Who You Are" samples the song "All My Life" as performed by K-Ci & JoJo and written by JoJo Bailey and Rory Bennett.
- "Best of Me" samples the song "Heartbreaker" as performed by Mariah Carey and Jay-Z and written by Mariah Carey, Jeffrey Cohen, Shawn Carter, Shirley Ellis, Lincoln Chase and Narada Michael Walden.

== Charts ==
Chart performance for 22
Chart (2022)	Peak position
Australian Digital Albums (ARIA)	9
Australian Physical Albums (ARIA)	86
Belgian Albums (Ultratop Flanders)	191
Scottish Albums (OCC)	25
UK Albums (OCC)	7

== Release history ==
Release history for 22
Region	Date	Format(s)	Label	Ref.
Various	30 September 2022	CD; digital download; streaming; vinyl	TS5; Moor	
