= Middle of the Night (Elley Duhé song) =

Single by Elley Duhé
- Released: January 10, 2020
- Length: 3:04
- Label: Not Fit for Society; RCA
- Songwriters: Elley Duhé; Andrew Wells; Samuel Elliot Roman
- Producer: Andrew Wells

Elley Duhé singles chronology
"Nature" (2019)	"Middle of the Night" (2020)	"Love Me Hard" (2020)

Music video
- "Middle of the Night" on YouTube

"Middle of the Night" (stylized in all caps) is a song by American singer Elley Duhé. It was released on January 10, 2020, through Not Fit for Society and RCA Records. Duhé, Andrew Wells and Samuel Elliot Roman co-wrote the song, based on Isaac Albéniz's 1892 composition "Asturias (Leyenda)". Although the song did not chart during its initial release, in late 2021 and 2022 it went viral on TikTok, entering the charts worldwide.

== Release and viral ==
"Middle of the Night" was released on January 10, 2020. Duhé parted ways with RCA Records the same week the song was released. In 2022, it went viral on TikTok, resulting in the song entering charts in various countries and received more than one billion streams on Spotify.

== Music video ==
The music video directed by Loris Russier was released on May 4, 2022. The song's first video was directed by Ashley Monaé and was released on January 4, 2022, then retitled the "lyric video".

== Charts ==
=== Weekly charts ===
2020–2022 weekly chart performance for "Middle of the Night"
Chart (2020–2022)	Peak position
Australia (ARIA)	25
Austria (Ö3 Austria Top 40)	27
Belarus Airplay (TopHit)	113
Canada (Canadian Hot 100)	44
CIS Airplay (TopHit)	35
Czech Republic Singles Digital (ČNS IFPI)	19
Estonia Airplay (TopHit)	17
Finland (Suomen virallinen lista)	15
France (SNEP)	20
Germany (GfK)	31
Global 200 (Billboard)	25
Greece International (IFPI)	1
Hungary (Single Top 40)	13
Hungary (Stream Top 40)	8
Iceland (Tónlistinn)	36
Ireland (IRMA)	28
India International (IMI)	5
Italy (FIMI)	88
Lithuania (AGATA)	5
Luxembourg (Billboard)	12
Malaysia International (RIM)	5
Netherlands (Single Top 100)	61
New Zealand (Recorded Music NZ)	16
Norway (VG-lista)	21
Portugal (AFP)	28
Romania (Billboard)	23
Romania Airplay (TopHit)	2
Romania Airplay (Media Forest)	3
Romania TV Airplay (Media Forest)	3
Russia Airplay (TopHit)	37
Singapore (RIAS)	20
Slovakia Singles Digital (ČNS IFPI)	8
South Africa Streaming (TOSAC)	79
Sweden (Sverigetopplistan)	78
Switzerland (Schweizer Hitparade)	15
Turkey (Billboard)	22
Ukraine Airplay (TopHit)	4
UK Singles (Official Charts)	43
US Bubbling Under Hot 100 Singles (Billboard)	5

2025 weekly chart performance for "Middle of the Night"
Chart (2025)	Peak position
Ukraine Airplay (TopHit)	88

=== Monthly charts ===
Monthly chart performance for "Middle of the Night"
Chart (2022–2023)	Peak position
CIS Airplay (TopHit)	37
Czech Republic (Singles Digitál – Top 100)	18
Estonia Airplay (TopHit)	50
Romania Airplay (TopHit)	3
Russia Airplay (TopHit)	40
Slovakia (Singles Digitál – Top 100)	8
Ukraine Airplay (TopHit)	7

=== Year-end charts ===
2022 year-end chart performance for "Middle of the Night"
Chart (2022)	Position
Australia (ARIA)	61
Austria (Ö3 Austria Top 40)	57
CIS Airplay (TopHit)	61
France (SNEP)	48
Germany (Official German Charts)	50
Global 200 (Billboard)	56
Hungary (Stream Top 40)	34
Lithuania (AGATA)	20
New Zealand (Recorded Music NZ)	46
Russia Airplay (TopHit)	96
Switzerland (Schweizer Hitparade)	32
Ukraine Airplay (TopHit)	99

2023 year-end chart performance for "Middle of the Night"
Chart (2023)	Position
CIS Airplay (TopHit)	117
Romania Airplay (TopHit)	41
Ukraine Airplay (TopHit)	34

2025 year-end chart performance for "Middle of the Night"
Chart (2025)	Position
Romania Airplay (TopHit)	145

== Certifications ==
Certifications for "Middle of the Night"
Region	Certification	Certified units/sales
Australia (ARIA)	Platinum	70,000^{‡}
Canada (Music Canada)	Platinum	80,000^{‡}
Denmark (IFPI Danmark)	Gold	45,000^{‡}
France (SNEP)	Diamond	333,333^{‡}
Germany (BVMI)	Gold	200,000^{‡}
Hungary (MAHASZ)	5× Platinum	20,000^{‡}
Italy (FIMI)	Platinum	100,000^{‡}
Mexico (AMPROFON)	Platinum	60,000^{‡}
New Zealand (RMNZ)	2× Platinum	60,000^{‡}
Poland (ZPAV)	3× Platinum	150,000^{‡}
Portugal (AFP)	Platinum	10,000^{‡}
Spain (Promusicae)	Gold	30,000^{‡}
Switzerland (IFPI Switzerland)	Platinum	20,000^{‡}
United Kingdom (BPI)	Platinum	600,000^{‡}
United States (RIAA)	Platinum	1,000,000^{‡}
Streaming
Greece (IFPI Greece)	2× Platinum	4,000,000^{†}
^{‡} Sales+streaming figures based on certification alone.^{†} Streaming-only figures based on certification alone.
