= Jaden Hossler =

American musician and TikTok personality

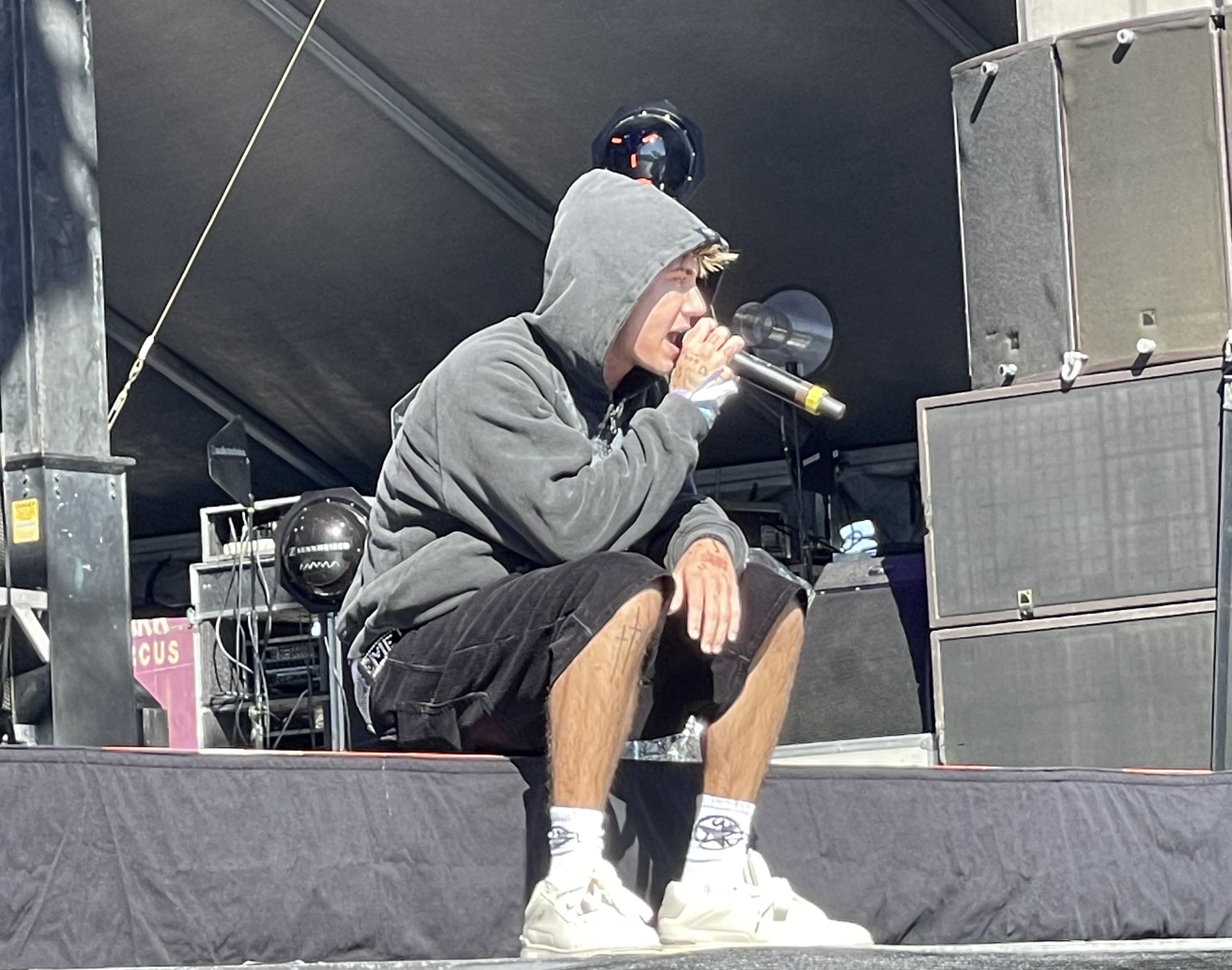
- Hossler performing at the When We Were Young Fest in October 2023

Background information
- Also known as: Jxdn
- Born: Jaden Isaiah Hossler; February 8, 2001 (age 25); Dallas, Texas, U.S.
- Origin: Memphis, Tennessee, U.S.
- Genres: Rock; pop-punk; emo rap; pop
- Occupations: Singer; songwriter; social media personality
- Instrument: Vocals
- Years active: 2019–present
- Labels: DTA; Elektra; Lava; Republic
- Website: jxdnmusic.com

TikTok information
- Page: Jxdn
- Followers: 8.7 million
- Last updated: March 4, 2026

Jaden Isaiah Hossler (born February 8, 2001), known professionally as Jxdn (stylized in all lowercase and pronounced "Jaden"), is an American singer-songwriter and social media personality from Chattanooga, Tennessee. Hossler rose to prominence on the video sharing app TikTok in 2019 before beginning a music career in early 2020 with the release of his debut single "Comatose".

== Early life ==
Jaden Isaiah Hossler was born in Texas and lived there until he moved to Tennessee at age 14. He attended Grace Baptist Academy for high school, as well as Aledo High School. Hossler was raised in a Christian household and grew up listening to classic rock and pop music. While in high school, he performed in multiple school plays. During his senior year of high school, Hossler listened to artists like Juice Wrld and XXXTentacion as he was treated for depression. Hossler stated that he attempted suicide twice during the same year.

== Career ==
=== 2019–2020: Career beginnings ===
In 2019, Hossler joined social media platform TikTok. Over the course of a few months, he gained millions of followers on the app and was invited to join talent agency Talent X and join the Sway House, a Los Angeles-based collective of content creators. Hossler would later leave the Sway House in May 2020. Despite this, Hossler would continue to see success on the platform, reaching 7.6 million followers in August 2020 and by December 2020, he had accumulated over 9 million followers on the platform.

=== 2020–2023: Shift to music, "La Di Die", and Tell Me About Tomorrow ===
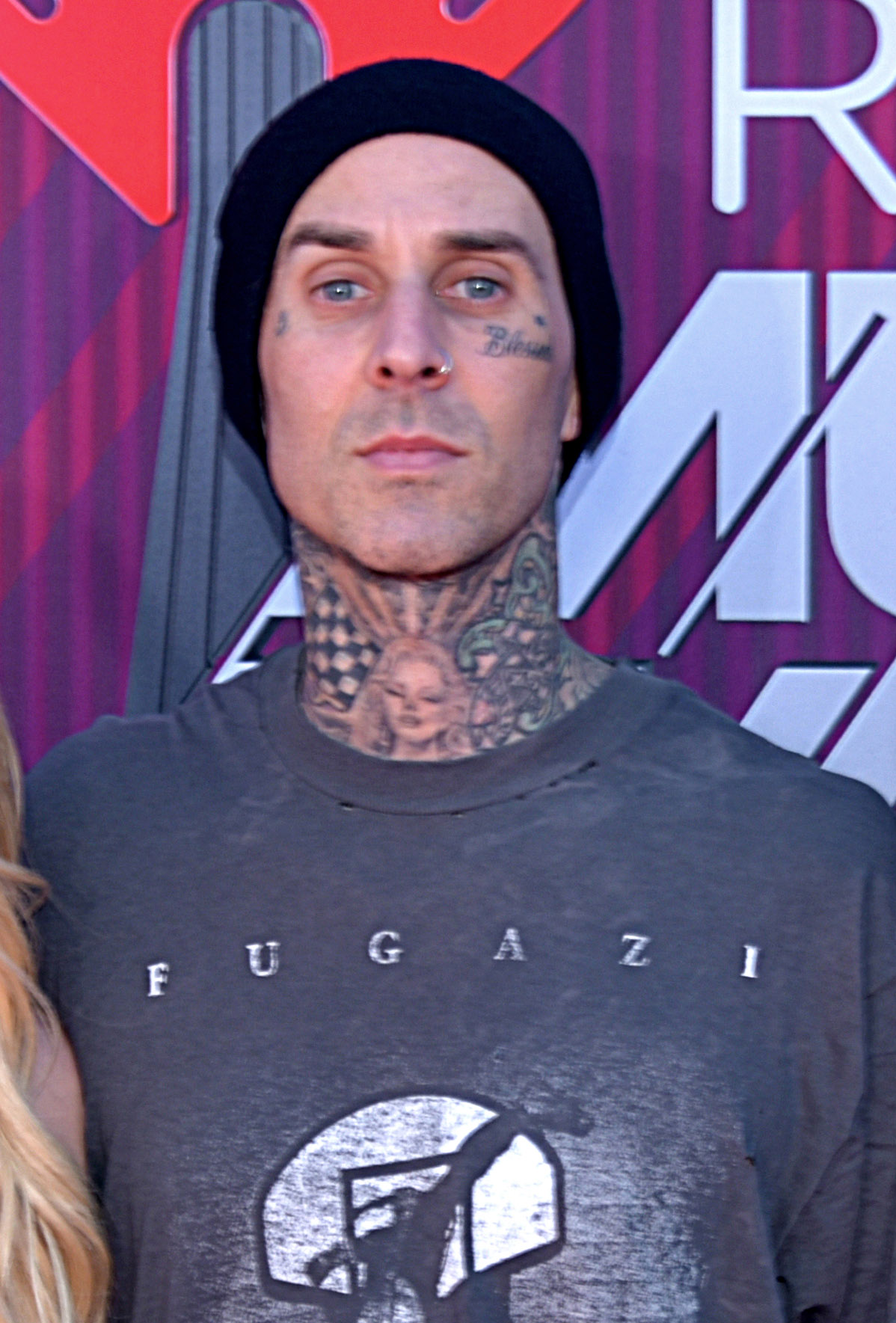
Travis Barker signed Hossler to DTA Records

Hossler began his music career in February 2020, when he self-released his debut single "Comatose". The single caught the attention of American musician Travis Barker, who signed him to his label DTA Records in a joint deal with Elektra Records. In May and July 2020, respectively, Hossler released the singles "Angels & Demons" and "So What". In August 2020, Hossler released the song "Pray" in which he opens up about his depression and suicidal thoughts, using the song to fundraise for suicide prevention. In October 2020, it was announced that Hossler was signed into a global co-publishing agreement with Warner Chappell Music. On October 21, 2020, he released a collaboration with Iann Dior, titled "Tonight". On December 18, 2020, Hossler released the single "Better Off Dead", co-written by Lauv and Blackbear with co-production from Travis Barker. Jxdn also revealed the title of his debut studio album Tell Me About Tomorrow.

In January 2021, Hossler appeared in Machine Gun Kelly's film Downfalls High. Later in the same month, Hossler released a rock version of Olivia Rodrigo's debut single "Drivers License" with production from Travis Barker. The following month, Hossler was featured on Nessa Barrett's single "La Di Die". The two artists, along with Barker, performed the single live for the first time on the April 7, 2021 episode of Jimmy Kimmel Live! and performed the song again on The Ellen DeGeneres Show on April 12, 2021. During the same month, Hossler was nominated for the Social Star award at the 2021 iHeartRadio Music Awards, but lost to Olivia Rodrigo.

On June 4, 2021, Hossler announced the track listing and release date for Tell Me About Tomorrow and released the fifth single from the album, "Think About Me". The album contains 18 songs and features guest appearances from Machine Gun Kelly and Iann Dior with production from Travis Barker. The album was released alongside the single "Wanna Be", a collaboration with Machine Gun Kelly. Hossler made his live concert debut at the Roxy Theatre in West Hollywood later that month.

In August 2021, Hossler performed "Think About Me" as part of MTV's Push series and was nominated for Push Performance of the Year at the 2021 MTV Video Music Awards. Around the same time, Hossler was an opening act on Machine Gun Kelly's "Tickets to My Downfall" Tour, which started in fall 2021 and also headlined his own "Tell Me About Tomorrow" tour which began at the same time.

On June 28, 2022, Hossler released the singles "Beautiful Boy" and "Even in the Dark" in memory of his friend Cooper Noriega, who died on June 9, 2022. The songs were released on what would have been Noriega's 20th birthday and were co-written by Barker, Aldae, Nick Long, and Liza Owen.

On November 11, 2022, Hossler released a new single "Sober" which was produced by Barker. The following month, Hossler announced his second tour as headliner, the I Hope This Never Ends tour.

Throughout the first half of 2023, Hossler released the singles "Freak" with Beauty School Dropout, "Friends with Benefits", "FUMD" with Amelia Moore, and "Elevated Heartbreak".

=== 2023–present: Temporary name change and What the Hell ===
In June 2023, ahead of the release of "Elevated Heartbreak", Hossler announced he would be taking a break from music for mental health reasons. While the single would not be delayed, he stated that he needed to take time to seek mental health treatment and rest. The following month, he returned to social media to announce that he was considering dropping the stage name Jxdn and instead going by his real name. Hossler later revealed that he was in rehab during that time, handling his anxiety and mental health issues and achieving sobriety.

In September 2023, Hossler announced "Chrome Hearted", his first song to be released under his real name. The single was released on October 6, 2023, and Hossler announced that it would mark his shift from primarily making pop-punk music to making pop music. Hossler also made his directorial debut, co-directing the music video for the song, citing his newfound sobriety for giving him the inspiration to do so.

This change did not last long. Returning to rock, the Jxdn name also came back and he released his second album When The Music Stops on June 28, 2024.

On October 17, 2025, Jxdn would return to pop music, releasing a new song titled ''Reputation'', along with a music video the same day.

== Legal issues ==
On May 25, 2020, while on a road trip in Lee County, Texas, Hossler and fellow Sway House member Bryce Hall were arrested on drug possession charges. Hossler was charged with possession of a controlled substance between 4 and 400 grams and was released on bond.

== Discography ==
=== Studio albums ===
Title	Album details	Peak chart positions				
Title	Album details	US	US Alt.	US Rock	AUS	CAN
Tell Me About Tomorrow	Released: July 2, 2021; Label: DTA, Elektra Records; Format: CD, Digital download, streaming, vinyl	95	6	13	96	83
When the Music Stops	Released: June 28, 2024; Label: DTA, Elektra Records; Format: CD, Digital download, streaming, vinyl	—	—	—	—	—

=== Extended plays ===
Title	EP details
28 (Songs for Cooper)	Released: June 28, 2022; Label: DTA, Elektra Records; Format: Digital download, streaming

=== Singles ===
==== As lead artist ====
List of singles as lead artist, with selected chart positions
Title	Year	Peak chart positions				Certifications	Album
Title	Year	US Bub.	US Rock	IRE	NZ Hot	Certifications	Album
"Comatose"	2020	—	25	—	—		Non-album single
"Angels & Demons"	2020	22	5	64	16	RIAA: Gold; MC: Gold	Tell Me About Tomorrow
"So What!"	2020	—	10	77	12		Tell Me About Tomorrow
"Pray"	2020	—	45	—	38		Non-album single
"Tonight" (featuring Iann Dior)	2020	—	29	—	—		Tell Me About Tomorrow
"Better Off Dead"	2020	—	37	—	22		Tell Me About Tomorrow
"Drivers License"	2021	—	—	—	—		Non-album single
"Think About Me"	2021	—	31	—	—		Tell Me About Tomorrow
"Wanna Be" (featuring Machine Gun Kelly)	2021	—	25	—	34		Tell Me About Tomorrow
"Happy Holidays, You Bastard"	2021	—	—	—	—		Spotify Singles: Holiday Collection
"Beautiful Boy"	2022	—	—	—	—		28 (Songs for Cooper)
"Even in the Dark"	2022	—	—	—	—		28 (Songs for Cooper)
"Sober"	2022	—	—	—	—		TBA
"Freak" (with Beauty School Dropout)	2023	—	—	—	—		Ready to Eat
"Friends with Benefits"	2023	—	—	—	—		TBA
"FUMD" (with Amelia Moore)	2023	—	—	—	—		TBA
"Elevated Heartbreak"	2023	—	—	—	—		TBA
"Chrome Hearted"	2023	—	—	—	—		TBA
"When The Music Stops"	2024						When The Music Stops
"What The Hell"	2024						When The Music Stops
"Stray"	2024						When The Music Stops
"Sad October"	2024						When The Music Stops
"Reputation"	2025						TBA
"—" denotes items which were not released in that country or failed to chart.

==== As featured artist ====
List of singles as featured artist
Title	Year	Peak chart positions					Certifications	Album
Title	Year	US Rock	CIS	IRE	NZ Hot	RUS	Certifications	Album
"This Ain't a Scene" (Audio Chateau featuring Jxdn)	2021	—	—	—	—	—		Non-album singles
"La Di Die" (Nessa Barrett featuring Jxdn)	2021	11	8	45	9	1	RIAA: Gold; MC: Gold	Non-album singles
"I'm Dead" (Nessa Barrett featuring Jxdn)	2021	—	—	—	—	—		Non-album singles
"—" denotes items which were not released in that country or failed to chart.

=== Other charted songs ===
Song	Year	Peak positions	Album
Song	Year	US Dance	Album
"Lifeline" (with Illenium)	2023	20	Illenium

=== Guest appearances ===
List of non-single guest appearances, with other performing artists, showing year released and album name
Title	Year	Other artist(s)	Album
"Lifeline"	2023	Illenium	Illenium

== Filmography ==
Year	Title	Role	Notes
2021	Downfalls High	Jock	

== Tours ==
=== Headlining ===
- Tell Me About Tomorrow Tour (2021–2022)
- I Hope This Never Ends Tour (2023)
- When the Music Stops Tour (2024)

=== Opening act ===
- Tickets to My Downfall Tour (2021)

== Awards and nominations ==
Award	Year	Recipient(s) and nominee(s)	Category	Result	Ref.
iHeartRadio Music Awards	2021	Himself	Social Star	Nominated	
MTV Video Music Awards	2021	"Think About Me"	Push Performance of the Year	Nominated	
