= Heartline =

Single by Craig David

from the album The Time Is Now
- Released: 14 September 2017
- Genre: R&B; electropop
- Length: 3:12
- Label: Insanity; Sony
- Songwriters: Craig David; Guy James Robin; Sam Romans
- Producer: Jonas Blue

Craig David singles chronology
"Bang Bang" (2016)	"Heartline" (2017)	"I Know You" (2017)

Music video
- "Heartline" on YouTube

"Heartline" is a song by British singer Craig David. It was written by David, Jonas Blue, and Sam Romans and produced by Blue for his seventh studio album, The Time Is Now (2018). The song was released as the album's lead single on 14 September 2017.

== Background ==
On 15 September 2017, David announced "Heartline" as the lead single from his then-upcoming seventh studio album, The Time Is Now, set to be released on 26 January 2018. "Heartline" is an R&B song with influences of electronic music, with a "bright" tune like "Ain't Giving Up", his previous single.

== Music video ==
The music video of the song was released on David's official YouTube account on 18 October 2017. Directed by Charlie Sarsfield, it was filmed in Ibiza.

== Charts ==
Weekly chart performance for "Heartline"
Chart (2017)	Peak position
Belgium (Ultratip Bubbling Under Flanders)	32
Ireland (IRMA)	85
Scotland Singles (OCC)	15
UK Singles (OCC)	24

== Certifications ==
Certifications of "Heartline"
Region	Certification	Certified units/sales
United Kingdom (BPI)	Gold	400,000^{‡}
^{‡} Sales+streaming figures based on certification alone.

== Release history ==
Release history and formats for "Heartline"
Region	Date	Format(s)	Label	Ref.
United Kingdom	14 September 2017	CD; digital download	Insanity; Sony	
