= The Time Is Now (album) =

Studio album by Craig David
- Released: 26 January 2018
- Recorded: 2016–2017
- Genre: Tropical house; R&B
- Length: 38:31
- Label: Speakerbox; Insanity; RCA
- Producer: Tre Jean-Marie; Fraser T. Smith; Kaytranada; Jonas Blue; Chase & Status; Steve Mac; Diztortion; Blonde; Nosaappollo

Craig David chronology
| Rewind – The Collection (2017) | The Time Is Now (2018) | 22 (2022) |

Singles from The Time Is Now
- 1. "Heartline" Released: 14 September 2017; 2. "I Know You" Released: 23 November 2017; 3. "Magic" Released: 6 April 2018

The Time Is Now is the seventh studio album by English singer Craig David, released on 26 January 2018. The album features guest appearances from JP Cooper, Bastille, AJ Tracey, Ella Mai, Kaytranada and GoldLink. The albums's first single, "Heartline", was released on 14 September 2017, through David's official YouTube account.

The album reached number two in the United Kingdom, making it David's fifth UK top 10 album.

== Background ==
On 15 September 2017, less than a year after the release of his comeback album Following My Intuition which became his first chart-topper for 16 years, David announced the follow-up, The Time Is Now. In an interview, David said: "The motivation and inspiration behind this album was all down to the huge realisation that even when I wasn't as focused, there were amazing lessons to be learnt."

The album features collaborations with Bastille, AJ Tracey, Kaytranada and GoldLink.

== Promotion ==
The first single from the album, "Heartline", was released on 14 September 2017, and peaked at 24 in the UK. The second single, "I Know You", featuring the British band Bastille, was released on 23 November 2017, and was commercially more successful than his recent singles, peaking at five in the UK. In further promotion of the album, David embarked on a tour and made appearances at music festivals around England, the United States, the Middle East and Europe to promote the album.

== Critical reception ==
Professional ratings
Aggregate scores
| Source | Rating |
|---|---|
| Metacritic | 56/100 |
Review scores
| Source | Rating |
| AllMusic | 3/5 stars |
| Clash | 6/10 |
| The Daily Telegraph | 3/5 stars |
| The Guardian | 3/5 stars |
| MusicOMH | 3.5/5 stars |
| NME | 3/5 stars |
| The Observer | 3/5 stars |
| Pitchfork | 5.5/10 |
| PopMatters | 5/10 |
| Under the Radar | 3/10 |

The Time Is Now received mixed reviews from music critics. At Metacritic, which assigns a normalised rating out of 100 to reviews from mainstream critics, the album has an average score of 56 based on 12 reviews, indicating "mixed or average reviews." Ben Hogwood from MusicOMH found that while the album was "undoubtedly a bit too long, The Time Is Now reaffirms Craig David's standing as a fine and flexible pop songwriter with all sorts of hooks up his sleeve. He is a more versatile singer these days, able to home in on an urban style, but moulding himself into different shapes, sizes and speeds." Neil McCormick from The Daily Telegraph criticized the album for its lack of lyrical depth and overreliance on Auto-Tune but pointed out that it was "packed with snappy, hook-laden songs, and plush electronic arrangements and rhythm tracks." Andre Paine, writing for The Evening Standard, called the album a "comeback that's going to keep adding followers," while NME's Leonie Cooper found that "what The Time Is Now lacks in coherency, it makes up for in sheer enthusiasm." AllMusic editor concluded that the album was "less scattered stylistically, yet less consistent quality-wise."

Damien Morris from The Observer felt that the album was offering "inspirational memes slathered over playlist-ready tropical R&B-pop" and called it a "glossily one-note album, an uncomplicated toast to desire sated, friendship reciprocated and love requited." Rachel Aroesti from The Guardian remarked that the album "contains notably less UK garage than its predecessor, and instead lives up to its name by mining trendy, but already quite tired, sounds from the charts [...] It's a shame that David barely draws on the genre he helped popularise, because here he often seems swallowed up by different styles. [He] may have worked hard to rejoin the pop firmament, but he seems slightly lost now that he’s arrived."

== Commercial performance ==
The Time Is Now reached number two on the UK Albums Chart, debuting with sales of 16,874 copies, behind the soundtrack of The Greatest Showman.

== Track listing ==
Standard edition
| No. | Title | Writer(s) | Producer(s) | Length |
|---|---|---|---|---|
| 1. | "Magic" | Craig David; Tre Jean-Marie; Ed Drewett | Tre Jean-Marie | 2:52 |
| 2. | "Heartline" | David; Guy James Robin; Sam Romans | Jonas Blue | 3:12 |
| 3. | "Brand New" | David; Steve McCutcheon | Steve Mac | 2:44 |
| 4. | "Going On" | David; Drewett; Fraser Thorneycroft-Smith; Tyrell "169" Paul; Josiah Dixon | Fraser T. Smith | 3:24 |
| 5. | "Love Me Like It's Yesterday" | David; Rachel Furner; Thorneycroft-Smith; Tyrell Paul | Fraser T. Smith | 3:32 |
| 6. | "For the Gram" | David; Raoul Lionel Chen | Diztortion | 3:54 |
| 7. | "Get Involved" (featuring JP Cooper) | David; Jean-Marie; John Paul Cooper | Tre Jean-Marie | 3:09 |
| 8. | "I Know You" (featuring Bastille) | David; Dan Smith; Thorneycroft-Smith; Helen "Carmen Reece" Culver | Fraser T. Smith | 3:34 |
| 9. | "Live in the Moment" (featuring GoldLink) | David; Jean-Marie; D'Anthony Carlos; Louis Celestin; David Bendeth; Robert Boyer | Kaytranada; Tre Jean-Marie^{[a]} | 3:06 |
| 10. | "Love Will Come Around" | David; Josiah Dixon; Thorneycroft-Smith; Tyrell Paul | Fraser T. Smith | 3:14 |
| 11. | "Somebody Like Me" (featuring AJ Tracey) | David; Ché Grant; Jacob Manson | Blonde | 2:54 |
| 12. | "Focus" | David; Furner; Thorneycroft-Smith; Tyrell Paul | Fraser T. Smith | 2:56 |
| Total length: | | | | 38:31 |

Deluxe edition bonus tracks
| No. | Title | Writer(s) | Producer(s) | Length |
|---|---|---|---|---|
| 13. | "Reload" (with Chase & Status) | David; Will Kennard; Saul Milton | Chase & Status | 3:10 |
| 14. | "Talk to Me" | David; Jean-Marie; Talay Riley | Tre Jean-Marie | 3:55 |
| 15. | "Talk to Me, Pt. II" (featuring Ella Mai) | David; Jean-Marie; Riley; Ella Mai; Nosa Obasohan | Tre Jean-Marie; Nosaapollo | 3:22 |
| Total length: | | | | 48:58 |

Japanese edition bonus tracks
| No. | Title | Writer(s) | Producer(s) | Length |
|---|---|---|---|---|
| 16. | "Armour" | David; Jean-Marie; Talay Riley | Tre Jean-Marie | 3:31 |
| 17. | "Heartline" (acoustic) | David; Guy James Robin; Sam Romans | Fraser T. Smith | 3:12 |
| 18. | "I Know You" (acoustic; featuring Bastille) | David; Dan Smith; Thorneycroft-Smith; Helen "Carmen Reece" Culver | Fraser T. Smith; Tobie Tripp; Dan Smith; Sophie Gledhill | 3:58 |
| Total length: | | | | 59:39 |

Notes

- ^{^[a]} signifies a vocal producer.

== Personnel ==
Credits adapted from album's liner notes.

- Mark Asari – backing vocals (tracks 9, 14), chant vocals (track 1)
- Jonas Blue – producer and mixing (track 2)
- Raoul Chen – producer, engineer, mixing, backing vocals, drum programming, and instruments (track 6)
- Wez Clarke – mixing (tracks 1, 3, 7, 14, 15)
- JP Cooper – vocals (track 7)
- Craig David – vocals (all tracks)
- Ed Drewett – chant vocals (track 1)
- Phebe Edwards – backing vocals (tracks 4, 5, 12)
- Lauren Faith – backing vocals (track 4)
- Rachel Furner – backing vocals (track 12)
- GoldLink – vocals (track 9)
- Manon Grandjean – engineer (tracks 4, 5, 8, 10, 12)
- Stuart Hawkes – mastering (all tracks)
- Tre Jean-Marie – producer (tracks 1, 7, 14, 15); vocal production, vocal mixing, and background vocals (track 9); chant vocals (track 1)
- Kaytranada – producer and mixing (track 9)
- William Kennard – producer, mixing, instrumentation, and programming (track 13)
- Chris Laws – engineer, drums, and percussion (track 3)
- Tim Laws – guitar (track 3)
- Colin Lester – executive producer
- Andy Mac – talkbox (track 14)
- Steve Mac – producer and keyboards (track 3)
- Rob MacFarlane – engineer (tracks 8, 13)
- Ella Mai – vocals (track 15)
- Jacob Manson – producer, engineer, mixing, guitar, keyboards, and drum programming (track 11)
- Brandon Michael – chant vocals (track 1)
- Saul Milton – producer, mixing, instrumentation, and programming (track 13)
- Nosaappollo – producer (track 15)
- Tyrell "169" Paul – producer (tracks 4, 10, 12), drum programming (tracks 4, 10)
- Dann Pursey – engineer (track 3)
- Carmen Reece – backing vocals (track 8)
- Sillkey – additional production (track 14)
- Dan Smith – vocals (track 8)
- Fraser T. Smith – producer, mixing, keyboards, and drum programming (tracks 4, 5, 8, 10, 12); guitar (tracks 4, 10)
- AJ Tracey – vocals (track 11)

== Charts ==
Chart performance for The Time Is Now
| Chart (2018) | Peak position |
|---|---|
| Australian Albums (ARIA) | 43 |
| Belgian Albums (Ultratop Flanders) | 77 |
| Belgian Albums (Ultratop Wallonia) | 128 |
| Czech Albums (ČNS IFPI) | 91 |
| Dutch Albums (Album Top 100) | 56 |
| French Albums (SNEP) | 157 |
| German Albums (Offizielle Top 100) | 97 |
| Irish Albums (IRMA) | 53 |
| Japanese Albums (Oricon) | 97 |
| Japanese Hot Albums (Billboard Japan) | 91 |
| New Zealand Heatseeker Albums (RMNZ) | 2 |
| Scottish Albums (OCC) | 9 |
| Spanish Albums (PROMUSICAE) | 47 |
| Swiss Albums (Schweizer Hitparade) | 75 |
| UK Albums (OCC) | 2 |
| UK R&B Albums (OCC) | 1 |

== Certifications ==
| Region | Certification | Certified units/sales |
|---|---|---|
| United Kingdom (BPI) | Silver | 60,000^{‡} |
^{‡} Sales+streaming figures based on certification alone.

== Release history ==
Release history and formats for The Time Is Now
| Region | Date | Format(s) | Label |
|---|---|---|---|
| United Kingdom | 26 January 2018 | CD; Digital download; streaming | Speakerbox; Insanity; Sony |
