= The Scarlet Opera =

American rock band

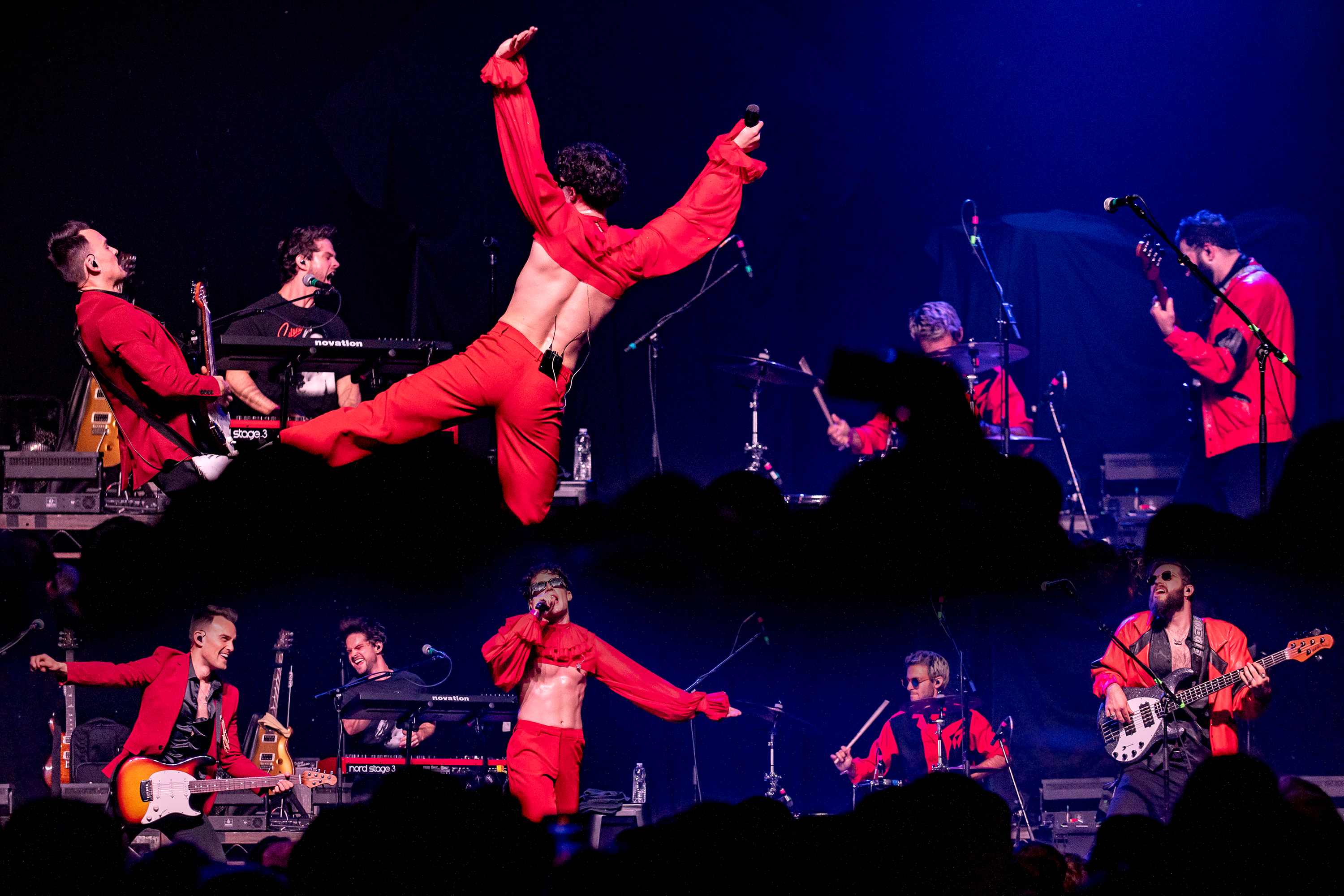
- The Scarlet Opera performing in 2023

Background information
- Also known as: Perta (2016–2022)
- Origin: Los Angeles, California
- Years active: 2016–present
- Label: Republic Records
- Members: Luka Bazulka (Vocals); Colin Kenrick (Keyboard); Daniel Zuker† (till 2025, Bass); Justin Siegal (Drums); Chance Taylor (Guitar)
- Website: thescarletopera.com

The Scarlet Opera, originally formed as Perta, is an American rock band from Los Angeles, California. Its members include Luka Bazulka (Lead Vocalist), Colin Kenrick (Pianist), Daniel Zuker (Bassist), Justin Siegal (Drummer), and Chance Taylor (Guitarist).

== History ==
=== Perta (2016–2022) ===
In 2016, Colin Kenrick met fellow CalArts alum Luka (né Matthew) Bazulka at a warehouse party in Los Angeles. After hearing the vocalist perform a solo set, Kenrick decided to form a band around Bazulka's story and voice. He brought along longtime friends Daniel Zuker, Justin Siegal, and Chance Taylor to round out their newly formed music group. Soon they became inseparable, taking camping trips and working on music in Kenrick's childhood bedroom in Calabasas. The band later moved to Sherman Oaks and began using Kenrick's kitchen as their new performance space. The band's sound drew from the bandmate's theatrical backgrounds, innate musical proficiency, and a variety of influences which range from rock bands such as Guns N' Roses to funk-pop artists such as Prince. The group formed under the name "Perta" which derived from one of Bazulka's favorite plays, Birdy—based on William Wharton's novel and adapted by Naomi Wallace—in which the main character befriends a bird named Perta. He stated one of the play's lines resonated with him in which Perta tells the protagonist to "forget this nonsense about 'being a boy.'" As Bazulka felt he has always blurred the line between masculine and feminine, the play, and thus the band's name, reminded him "of being that boy and giving [himself] that advice of choosing to exist in happiness."

In 2018, under representation by WME, the band released their single "From Fire" and caught the attention of Paper magazine and Alec Baldwin, who interviewed Bazulka and Kenrick on his podcast Here's the Thing.

=== The Scarlet Opera (2022–present) ===
After a brief hiatus, the band reinvented itself in 2022 as "The Scarlet Opera." The name derives itself from Nathaniel Hawthorne's The Scarlet Letter. According to the band, it stands for the misunderstood and the misrepresented. "The music, the shows, the glamour are all devoted to the outcasts, to the sexually liberated, to those who don’t come from wealth, to those who are divine."

The band signed with Republic Records and released their first single, "The Place to Be," on September 16, 2022. On January 20, 2023, The Scarlet Opera released their second single, "Big City Thing." They then made their television debut on The Late Late Show with James Corden in March 2023, performing their song "Alive." Shortly after, the band released their first EP, Comedy. On October 6th, 2023, NHL 24 released, which featured The Scarlet Opera’s song titled "Riot" in its soundtrack.

On April 23, 2025, the band announced via their Instagram that bassist and founding member Danny Zuker had died. He had announced in February of that year that he was suffering from Esophageal cancer.

== Discography ==
=== Releases as Perta ===
==== Singles ====
- "From Fire" (2018)

=== Releases as The Scarlet Opera ===
==== Singles ====
- "The Place to Be" (2022)
- "Big City Thing" (2023)
- "Alive" (2023)
- "Riot" (2023)
- "That Kind of Woman" (2023)
- "Catch Me If You Can" (2024)
- "Someone’s Gotta Love ‘Em" (2024)
- "Heaven Is A Place On Earth" *Belinda Carlisle cover*(2024)
- ”The Winter Takes The Fall” (2025)

==== EPs ====
- Comedy (2023)
- Mirror, Mirror (2024)
