= Another Planet/Voyager =

"Another Planet" / "Voyager"

Single by Pendulum

from the album Hold Your Colour
- Released: 23 February 2004
- Recorded: 2003
- Genre: Drum and bass
- Length: 7:33 ("Another Planet"); 6:07 ("Voyager"); 5:41 ("Voyager" picture disc version)
- Label: Breakbeat Kaos
- Songwriters: Rob Swire; Gareth McGrillen; Paul Harding

Pendulum singles chronology
"Spiral" / "Ulterior Motive" (2003)	"Another Planet" / "Voyager" (2004)	"Back 2 You" / "Still Grey" (2004)

"Another Planet" / "Voyager" is the second single by Australian drum and bass band Pendulum. It was released on 23 February 2004 by independent label Breakbeat Kaos and was their first single to use the 12-inch picture disc format. The single peaked at number 46 in the UK Singles Chart and reached number one in the UK Dance Chart.

The song "Another Planet" contains samples from Jeff Wayne's musical version of The War of the Worlds and was included on the CD edition of Hold Your Colour when it was released in July 2005. Both tracks appeared on the compilation album Jungle Sound: The Bassline Strikes Back!

== Background and Writing ==
"Another Planet" (album version)
30 second sample. Includes the line by Richard Burton from which the song takes its name.

Unlike every other single released by Pendulum to date, "Another Planet" / "Voyager" was written and produced in full by all members of the band, which at the time included Rob Swire, Paul Harding, and Gareth McGrillen. The song track "Another Planet" uses samples from Jeff Wayne's musical version of The War of the Worlds, including several samples of dialogue by Richard Burton.

McGrillen had developed a fear of The War of the Worlds when he was quite young, to the extent that he could not look at the album cover. Years later, while he was working on a song with Swire, he decided to face his fear by travelling home and returning with his father's copy, which they subsequently sampled for the song. One of the samples they used contained a line spoken by Burton, "...and I wandered through the weird and lurid landscape of another planet," which later gave the song its name.

== Critical reception ==
"Another Planet / Voyager" was the first single by Pendulum to receive widespread recognition, and as such was subject to critical attention. One review of the single describes "Voyager" as "a really well done piece of dancefloor drum and bass action", and says that "Pendulum have coined their own recognisable sound, but manage to stay fresh at the same time". "Another Planet" in particular has received a wide range of criticism, partially due to its placement on two albums, and has been described both as "conventional [drum and bass], being largely instrumental and synth based", and as a "crowd favourite ... [that] sounds far too serious for that goofy, bouncy bassline to work".

== Marketing and Release ==
"Another Planet" / "Voyager" was released on 23 February 2004 in two formats, a standard 12-inch single and a 12-inch picture disc: the first of several singles by Pendulum to use this format. It was also their first release with independent drum and bass label Breakbeat Kaos, which remained their main label for the next three years.

"Another Planet" was featured on the CD edition of Hold Your Colour, released in July 2005, but was later replaced by the song "Blood Sugar" after the album was reissued. It was also featured on the mix album Fabric Live 22, alongside Pendulum's remix of Nightbreed's "Pack of Wolves". An alternative version of the song, titled "Another Planet (VIP)", was produced and released on the Bass Invaderz compilation album. Both tracks from the single were also featured in another compilation album – Jungle Sound - the Bassline Strikes Back! – released in October 2004.

== Chart performance ==
"Another Planet" / "Voyager" was the first single by Pendulum to appear in the UK Singles Chart. It entered the chart on 6 March 2004, peaking at number 46, and remained in the chart for a total of two weeks. The single also performed well in the UK Dance Chart, remaining at number one for two weeks on 6 March and 13 March.

== Track listing ==
12-inch vinyl single
(BBK003; released 23 February 2004)

A. "Another Planet" – 7:33
AA. "Voyager" – 6:07

12-inch picture disc
(BBK003P; released 23 February 2004)

A. "Another Planet" – 7:33
AA. "Voyager" – 5:41

== Personnel ==
The following people contributed to "Another Planet" / "Voyager".

- Rob Swire – writer, synthesiser, producer, mixing
- Gareth McGrillen – writer, producer
- Paul Harding – writer, producer
- Simon Davey – mastering

== Charts ==
Chart (2004)	Peak position
UK Dance Chart	1
UK Singles Chart	46
