= Painkiller (Freestylers song) =

"Pendulum / Freestylers – Painkiller"

Single by Freestylers featuring Pendulum and SirReal

from the album Adventures in Freestyle
- B-side: "Jump 'N' Twist"
- Released: 28 August 2006 (UK)
- Genre: Drum and bass; electronic rock
- Length: 5:32 (original version); 3:46 (radio edit)
- Label: Against the Grain
- Songwriter(s): Matt Cantor; Aston Harvey; Rob Swire; Marcel Atteen
- Producer(s): Freestylers; Pendulum

Alternative cover
- "Painkiller" remixes 12" cover

Freestylers singles chronology
"Boom Blast" (2005)	"Painkiller" (2006)	"In Love With You" (2006)

Pendulum singles chronology
"Hold Your Colour" / "Streamline" (2006)	"Painkiller" (2006)	"Blood Sugar" / "Axle Grinder" (2007)

"Painkiller" is a 2006 single by Freestylers featuring Pendulum and SirReal. It was released to promote the release of Freestylers' album Adventures in Freestyle. Pendulum had previously collaborated with Freestylers for the track "Fasten Your Seatbelt", which was released as a single and appeared on the former's 2005 album, Hold Your Colour. The single was released on 12" vinyl and on CD, with a second remix single being released on 12" vinyl.

A music video for the song exists.

== Track listing ==
- 12" single (ATG019)
  - A. "Painkiller" – 5:32
  - B. "Jump 'N' Twist" – 5:55
- 12" remix single (ATG019R)
  - A. "Painkiller" (Noisia remix) – 6:04
  - B. "Painkiller" (Ed Solo & Skool of Thought remix) – 5:58
- CD single (ish-Media and Against the Grain versions)
  1. "Painkiller" (radio edit) – 3:46
  2. "Painkiller" – 5:32
  3. "Painkiller" (Ed Solo & Skool of Thought remix) – 5:58
  4. "Painkiller" (Noisia remix) – 6:04
  5. "Jump 'N' Twist" – 5:55
