= The Reworks =

Remix album by Pendulum
- Released: 29 June 2018
- Genres: Electronica, drum and bass, breakbeat
- Length: 64:50
- Label: Earstorm

Pendulum chronology
Immersion (2010)	The Reworks (2018)	Elemental (2021)

The Reworks is the first remix album by the Australian drum and bass band Pendulum. It was released on 29 June 2018 through Earstorm. Despite being announced as a new album in early 2018, the album contains remixed versions of titles that appeared on their three studio albums Hold Your Colour, In Silico and Immersion or had been single B-sides.

== Track listing ==
Digital download
No.	Title	Length
1.	"Hold Your Colour" (Noisia Remix)	5:24
2.	"Blood Sugar" (Knife Party Remix)	4:04
3.	"9,000 Miles" (Eelke Kleijn Remix)	8:21
4.	"The Island, Pt. 1 (Dawn)" (Skrillex Remix)	3:29
5.	"Propane Nightmares" (Grabbitz Remix)	3:53
6.	"Crush" (Devin Townsend Remix)	4:38
7.	"Tarantula" (Icarus Remix; featuring DJ Fresh, Spyda and Tenor Fly)	6:38
8.	"Witchcraft" (Pegboard Nerds Remix)	3:21
9.	"Watercolour" (Matrix & Futurebound Remix)	5:30
10.	"The Island, Pt. 1 (Dawn)" (AN21 Remix)	3:56
11.	"Still Grey" (DJ Seinfeld Remix)	5:13
12.	"Vault" (Moby Remix)	6:43
13.	"Streamline" (Attlas Remix)	3:49

== Charts ==
Chart (2018)	Peak position
Australian Albums (ARIA)	29
UK Albums (Official Charts)	61
UK Dance Albums (Official Charts)	3
UK Independent Albums (Official Charts)	8
