= Adventures in Freestyle =

Studio album by Freestylers
- Released: 2 October 2006
- Length: 62:54
- Labels: Against the Grain, PIAS
- Producer: Freestylers

Freestylers chronology
FabricLive.19 (2004)	Adventures in Freestyle (2006)	A Different Story Vol.1 (2007)

Singles from Adventures in Freestyle
- 1. "Painkiller" Released: 18 September 2006; 2. "In Love with You" Released: 13 November 2006; 3. "Electrified" Released: 9 April 2007; 4. "Security" Released: 16 July 2007

Adventures in Freestyle is the fourth album by the British electronic music group Freestylers, released on 2 October 2006.

The album contains the track "Painkiller", which has been released as a single before the album, and it features Pendulum, with whom they had already collaborated with on the track "Fasten Your Seatbelt" from their album Hold Your Colour.

== Track listing ==
No.	Title	Vocals	Length
1.	"In the Beginning"		2:23
2.	"Security" (co-produced by Pendulum)	Ragman	4:56
3.	"Could I Be Dreaming?"	Ragman, Bad Manner, Ewan O'Brien (backing vocals)	4:24
4.	"Fast Life"	SirReal	4:35
5.	"In Love with You" (co-produced by Sy & Unknown)	Corrina Greyson	4:02
6.	"Jump 'n' Twist"		5:13
7.	"Pocketful of Sadness"	Ragman	4:01
8.	"Electrified" (co-produced by SirReal) (scratches by Mad Doctor X & Prime Cuts)	Ragman, Bad Manner, SirReal, Ayak	3:42
9.	"Hard to Stay"	Sharlene Hector	4:14
10.	"Painkiller" (co-produced by Pendulum)	SirReal, Rob Swire	4:26
11.	"Turn to Dust" (co-produced by CTRL-Z)	Gareth Johnson, Ivory, Ragman	5:06
12.	"Old Skool Fool" (additional production from SirReal) (scratches by Mad Doctor X)	SirReal	2:32
13.	"So Fine" (co-produced by Rez Safinia)	Ragman	4:35
14.	"Beat It Down"	SirReal	4:53
15.	"Infernos" (scratches by Mad Doctor X)	Sharlene Hector	3:51
Total length:			1:02:54

- Track 2 is a cover of "Security" by the Beat Club.
- Track 3 is a remix of "Feeling the Love" by Reactor.
- Track 5 samples "To Cut a Long Story Short" by Spandau Ballet.
