= Jungle Sound: The Bassline Strikes Back! =

Compilation album by Breakbeat Kaos
- Released: 4 October 2004 (original release); 27 February 2006 (reissue)
- Recorded: 2004–06
- Genre: Drum and bass; electronica
- Length: 117:29 (original release); 134:10 (reissue)
- Label: Breakbeat Kaos (BBK001)
- Producer: Adam F; Fresh; Paul Harding

Reissue cover
- Jungle Sound: Gold

Jungle Sound: The Bassline Strikes Back! is a compilation album, released in 2004 by the British independent record label Breakbeat Kaos, and reissued in 2006 as Jungle Sound: Gold. It featured tracks from artists such as Fresh, Pendulum and Adam F. The album was mixed by Paul Harding from Pendulum, although there was no mention of it in the original artwork.

== Jungle Sound: Gold ==
The reissue saw the unmixed disc replaced by a new unmixed one. The album's artwork was changed to credit Pendulum for mixing the album, which became notable for its controversy. Shortly after the release, Rob Swire denounced on the Dogs on Acid forum that he did not know of the release, and did not give permission. This caused an uproar in the thread, many members believing that Fresh was capitalizing on the success of Hold Your Colour. The scandal eventually caused Pendulum to leave the label. Also, in Jungle Sound Gold, a mistake was made in the track list of disc 2. The first track "Intro" was "Masochist", which made a shift in all song titles, making all of them wrong, and having "Another Planet" named as "Untitled Track". Moreover, disc 1 was the mixed album by Pendulum while disc 2 contained the unmixed tracks.

== Track listing ==
Disc 1 (unmixed)
No.	Title	Producer(s)	Length
1.	"Circles" (2000 VIP mix)	Adam F and TKO	4:36
2.	"Living Daylights"	Fresh	5:47
3.	"Kingston Vampires"	Fresh and Pendulum	5:29
4.	"Dreadlock"	Future Prophecies	6:56
5.	"You Can't Touch"	Dillinja	5:30
6.	"When The Sun Goes Down" (Origin Unknown remix)	Fresh and Adam F	6:09
7.	"Therapy"	Adam F and TKO	6:39
8.	"Hear My Voice"	Fresh	5:38
9.	"Masochist"	Pendulum	4:56
10.	"T-10" (VIP mix)	Distorted Minds	4:59
Total length:			56:39

Disc 2 (mixed by Paul Harding)
No.	Title	Producer(s)	Length
1.	"Intro"	Pendulum	0:25
2.	"Masochist"	Pendulum	2:27
3.	"Dreadlock"	Future Prophecies	2:12
4.	"The Shakedown"	Baron	3:01
5.	"You Can't Touch"	Dillinja	1:56
6.	"T-10" (VIP mix)	Distorted Minds	3:29
7.	"Voyager"	Pendulum	4:27
8.	"The Living Daylights"	Fresh	4:27
9.	"When The Sun Goes Down" (Origin Unknown remix)	Fresh and Adam F	4:02
10.	"Original Jungle Sound" (Switch mix)	Adam F and Fresh	3:50
11.	"Therapy"	Adam F and TKO	5:48
12.	"Circles" (2000 VIP mix)	Adam F and TKO	3:14
13.	"Hear My Voice"	Fresh	3:46
14.	"Labyrinth"	Vandalz	1:43
15.	"Submarines" (Pendulum remix)	Fresh	2:31
16.	"Kingston Vampires"	Fresh and Pendulum	3:35
17.	"Foreigner"	Fresh	4:13
18.	"Another Planet"	Pendulum	5:44
Total length:			60:50

=== Reissue ===
The reissue sees the unmixed disc replaced by a new unmixed one.

Disc 1 (unmixed)
No.	Title	Producer(s)	Length
1.	"Circles" (2000 VIP mix)	Adam F and TKO	4:36
2.	"Living Daylights II"	Fresh	5:44
3.	"Kingston Vampires"	Fresh and Pendulum	5:30
4.	"Dreadlock"	Future Prophecies	6:57
5.	"Duppy Man"	Chase & Status and Capleton	5:56
6.	"8Ball"	Adam F	5:04
7.	"Therapy"	Adam F and TKO	6:38
8.	"Hear My Voice"	Fresh	5:36
9.	"Masochist" (VIP mix)	Pendulum	5:02
10.	"Decade"	Baron	5:44
11.	"When The Sun Goes Down" (radio edit)	Fresh and Adam F	3:11
12.	"Matador"	Fresh	5:42
13.	"Karma" (John B remix)	Guru	7:40
Total length:			73:20
