= Security (disambiguation) =

Security is the degree of protection against danger, damage, loss, and crime.

Security may also refer to:

- Airport security
- Computer security
- Energy security
  - Security (electrical grid), a real-time component of reliability
- Food security
- Security of person, a human right as defined by the United Nations
- Information security
- Juridical security, also called legal security
- Military security
- National security
- Physical security
- Social security

== Finance ==
- Economic security
- Security (finance), a financial instrument
- Security interest in a financial transaction (in law and business)

== Music ==
- Security (album), the U.S./Canada title for the self-titled 1982 studio album by Peter Gabriel
- "Security" (song), a song by Kanye West from his album Donda 2
- "Security", a 1988 song by The Beat Club
  - "Security", a 2006 cover by the Freestylers from the album Adventures in Freestyle
- "Security!", a 2019 song by Ecco2k from his studio album E
- "Security", a song by Etta James off her album Tell Mama
- "Security", a song by Stacie Orrico from her eponymous album
- "Security", a song by Royce da 5'9" from his studio album Success Is Certain

== Other uses ==
- Security (2017 film), an American action film
- Security (2021 film), an Italian thriller film
- "Security" (The Unit), a television episode
- ST Security, a British tugboat
- Security, Colorado, a census-designated place in the United States

== See also ==
- Security convergence
- Securitas (disambiguation)
