= Halogen (band) =

Australian rock band

- Origin: Perth, Western Australia
- Genres: Rock
- Years active: 1997–2007
- Labels: Phantom/MGM; Karmic Hit
- Past members: Frans Bisschops; Jasmine Yee; Ben Crooke; Rob Maszkowski; Trent Dhue

Halogen were an Australian rock band, formed in Perth, Western Australia in 1997. Founding mainstays were Frans Bisschops on guitar and keyboards and Jasmine Yee on lead vocals – both expatriate New Zealanders. Halogen released three albums, Save the Ones You Love (March 2003), Building on the Edge of the Sky (July 2004) and Sirens (July 2006), before disbanding in 2007.

== History ==
Halogen released a five-track debut extended play, Into the Crash Barrier (1999).

They gained national exposure with the track, "Hole Around My Heart", from their second EP, Somewhere You're Alone (2001), via Phantom Records/MGM Distribution.

The group won WAM Song of the Year in 2001 in the Love category. They released a second single, "Walkaway", in February 2002 and undertook a tour of Australia's east coast including performing at the Australian Music Week. The single received airplay on national broadcaster Triple J. A follow-up single, "On a Bridge", also gained airplay on Triple J. Both singles appeared on their debut album, Save the Ones You Love (March 2003), via Karmic Hit, a Sydney-based independent record label formed by Steve Kilbey of the Church. They released a third single, "Caught Me", in 2003 which was supported by another tour of the eastern coast of Australia.

Undercover's Tim Cashmere reviewed Save the Ones You Love, and provided a track-by-track analysis, of the singles he felt that "On a Bridge", was "Leaning towards the rock 'n' roll influences in the group, [it] is a welcome second. Once again, [Yee's] vocal is nothing short of flawless and lyrics that leave the listener intrigued as to what said person was thinking." "Caught Me", he observed, "shows the group working with dynamic, another quality so many bands, both local and international are lacking."

Their second album, Building on the Edge of the Sky (July 2004), had Bisschops and Yee providing their compositions to 15 different emerging producers: one each to work on. When it appeared via Karmic Hit, Chris Havercroft of X-Press Online observed, "long time purveyors of the dark, brooding, gothic guitar driven pop songs has served them moderately well in the past, however their new found interest in electronic music appears to be a masterstroke." FasterLouder's Stormin' Norman compared it to their first album, "[which] is definitely emo-rock, this collection could be described by mutating comparisons to Enya and Propellerheads rather than their usual melancholy selves... [with] dreamy, emotional mood and the subtle use of electronic music effects."

In February 2006 another EP, Baby Eyes, preceded the release of the band's third album, Sirens, which appeared in July of that year. Halogen disbanded in the following year. In addition to her work in Halogen, Yee provided vocals on the Pendulum song, "Sounds of Life" for that group's album, Hold Your Colour (2005), backing vocals for Fourth Floor Collapse and vocals for "Can't let You be Lonely" by the Transients. Bisschops and Yee formed, She Selexx, an electronica project with local producer, Trilby Temperley, who is the older brother of Kavyen Temperley (Eskimo Joe).

== Members ==
- Frans Bisschops – guitar, keyboards (1997–2007)
- Jasmine Yee – vocals (1997–2007)
- Jeff Bullen – drums (1998–2000)
- Jason Clemo – guitar (1998–2000)
- Chris Ashton – guitar (2000–2003)
- Ben Crooke – drums (2000–2007)
- Neil Scothern – bass guitar (2000–2002)
- Rob Maszkowski – bass guitar (2002–2007)
- Trent Dhue – guitar, keyboard, trumpet (2003–2007)

== Discography ==
=== Albums ===
Title	Details
Save The Ones You Love	Released: 10 March 2003; Label: Karmic Hit (KH016); Format: CD
Building on the Edge of the Sky	Released: July 2004; Label: Karmic Hit (KH020); Format: CD
Sirens	Released: July 2004; Label: Karmic Hit (KH036); Format: CD

=== Extended plays ===
Title	Details
Into the Crash Barrier	Released: 1999; Label: Halogen (H#001); Format: CD
Somewhere You're Alone	Released: February 2001; Label: Phantom/MGM (PMR040s); Format: CD
Baby's Eyes	Released: February 2006; Label: Karmic Hit (KH034); Format: CD

== Awards ==
=== WAM Song of the Year ===
The WAM Song of the Year was formed by the Western Australian Rock Music Industry Association Inc. (WARMIA) in 1985, with its main aim to develop and run annual awards recognising achievements within the music industry in Western Australia.

Year	Nominee / work	Award	Result (wins only)
2001	Hole Around My Heart	Song of the Year - Grand Prize	Won
2001	Hole Around My Heart	Song of the Year - Love	Won
2004	Blame Me	Song of the Year - Love	Won
