= Guns at Dawn =

"Guns at Dawn" / "Ratpack"

Single by Baron featuring Pendulum
- Released: 20 March 2005
- Recorded: 2005
- Genre: Drum and bass
- Length: 5:44 "Guns at Dawn"; 4:23 "Ratpack"
- Label: Breakbeat Kaos (BBK008)
- Songwriter(s): Baron
- Producer(s): Baron; Pendulum

Baron singles chronology
| "Butt Ugly Martians" / "Hanger Lane" (2004) | "Guns at Dawn" / "Ratpack" (2005) | ""Squelch" (remixes)" (2005) |

Pendulum singles chronology
| "Back 2 You" / "Still Grey" (2004) | "Guns at Dawn" (2005) | "Tarantula" / "Fasten Your Seatbelt" (2005) |

"Guns at Dawn" / "Ratpack" is a 2005 single by English musician Baron featuring Pendulum.

== Chart performance ==
"Guns at Dawn" / "Ratpack" entered the UK Singles Chart on week 17, 2005. It peaked at number 71 before dropping out a week later.

| Chart (2005) | Peak position |
|---|---|
| UK Singles Chart | 71 |

== Formats and track listings ==
These are the major formats and associated track listings of single releases of "Guns at Dawn" / "Ratpack".

12" vinyl single
(BBK008; released 20 March 2005)

A. "Guns at Dawn" – 5:44
AA. "Ratpack" – 4:23

12" picture disc
(BBK008P; released 20 March 2005)

A. "Guns at Dawn" – 5:44
AA. "Ratpack" – 4:23

== Personnel ==
The following people contributed to "Guns at Dawn" / "Ratpack".

- Baron – writer, producer, mixing
- Pendulum – additional production on "Guns at Dawn"
- Jack Adams – mastering
