= Sound of You =

2025 song by Armin van Buuren

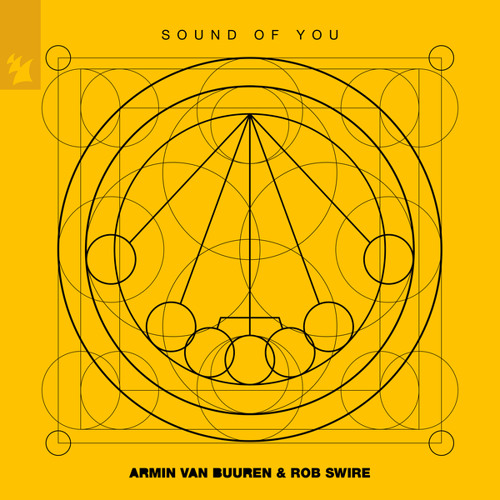

Single by Armin van Buuren and Rob Swire

from the album Breathe
- Released: 27 March 2025
- Recorded: 2024
- Genre: Progressive house
- Length: 3:09 (Radio Edit); 5:22 (Extended Mix)
- Label: Armada Music
- Songwriters: Armin van Buuren; Robert Swire-Thompson; Jim Van Hooff; Johnny Newman; Max Adrian; Raffie van Maren
- Producers: Armin van Buuren; Rob Swire; J Ribbon

"Sound of You" is a song by Dutch DJ and producer Armin van Buuren and Australian musician, singer, and producer Rob Swire. The track was officially released on March 27, 2025, on Armada Music. It is a genre-blending song that has been described by sources as a fusion of progressive house, trance, and drum and bass.

The collaboration marks Swire's first vocal feature outside of his own projects in several years. The song was premiered by Armin van Buuren during his mainstage set at Ultra Music Festival 2024, where its high-energy drop and emotional melody quickly made it a fan favorite. According to quotes from both artists, the collaboration began after Armin van Buuren sent Swire the instrumental track, and Swire knew instantly that he wanted to sing on it.

== Pendulum version ==
"Sound of You"
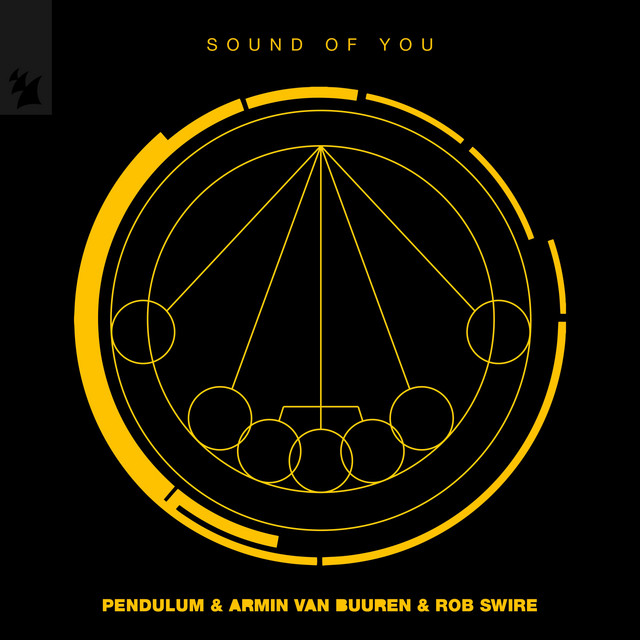

Song by Pendulum and Armin van Buuren and Rob Swire
- Released: 11 April 2025
- Genre: Drum and bass
- Length: 3:24
- Label: Armada Music
- Songwriters: Armin van Buuren; Robert Swire-Thompson; Jim Van Hooff; Johnny Newman; Max Adrian; Raffie van Maren
- Producers: Armin van Buuren; Rob Swire; J Ribbon

Following the release of the original song, a drum and bass remix by Pendulum was released on April 11, 2025. This version of the track was born from a shared studio session where Armin van Buuren suggested they create a drum and bass rendition together with Pendulum. The remix fuses Pendulum's signature high-energy sound with Armin's euphoric elements. The track was also a major festival highlight, with an earlier version being premiered by Armin van Buuren at a live show, further building anticipation for its official release.

== Charts ==
Following its release, "Sound of You" saw success on several electronic and dance music charts. The original mix reached number one on the Beatport Mainstage Chart, while the Pendulum remix reached number one on the Beatport Drum & Bass Chart. In the United Kingdom, the song has charted on the Official Singles Downloads Chart, reaching a peak position of 63. The song has not yet appeared on major national charts, such as the ARIA Top 100 Singles Chart in Australia or the Official UK Singles Chart.

Chart (2025)	Peak position
UK Official Singles Downloads ChartOCC	63
