= Slam (Pendulum song) =

"Slam" / "Out Here"

Single by Pendulum

from the album Hold Your Colour
- Released: 19 September 2005 (UK)
- Recorded: 2004–2005
- Genre: Drum and bass ("Slam"); breakbeat ("Out Here")
- Length: 5:45 ("Slam"); 6:07 ("Out Here")
- Label: Breakbeat Kaos (BBK011)
- Songwriters: Rob Swire; Gareth McGrillen; Paul Harding
- Producers: Rob Swire; Gareth McGrillen; Paul Harding

Pendulum singles chronology
"Tarantula" / "Fasten Your Seatbelt" (2005)	"Slam" / "Out Here" (2005)	"Hold Your Colour" (2005)

Alternative cover
- "Slam" CD cover

"Slam" is a song by Australian drum and bass band Pendulum. It was released on 19 September 2005 by independent label Breakbeat Kaos as a double A-side single with "Out Here", and it was their third release with the label. It peaked number 34 on the UK Singles Chart. Both songs have been included on their CD release of Hold Your Colour in July 2005. "Slam", as well as the "Prelude" track from Hold Your Colour, samples spoken word sections from the Headhunterz song "Rock Civilization". When the song is performed live with the full band, the first minute and a half is cut out and replaced by part of the Metallica song, "Master of Puppets". However, when the song was played in DJ sets prior to 2006, the track "Prelude" was played before it, as "Slam" was always the first track played.

The B-side track, "Out Here", is one of the few break songs included in Hold Your Colour (as well as "Fasten Your Seatbelt" from the previous single). It is also the only song to have vocals from Gareth McGrillen (as well as Rob Swire), despite them being altered.

== Music video ==
Due to its success, "Slam" became the first Pendulum song to have a music video, as well as their only song from Hold Your Colour and made while signed with Breakbeat Kaos with a music video. Under the production of Creative Wrkz and co-directed by Teebone and Adam Brown, it was released in 2005 and last a total length of four minutes and nineteen seconds (4:19). The video uses the "Prelude" track from Hold Your Colour as an intro. The video is about a man (John Dough played by actor Paul Nicholls) wearing a suit and holding a duffel bag (as seen in the CD single cover) who, after taking out a copy of Hold Your Colour and putting a CD of "Slam" into his portable stereo, is seen dancing in public in and around the Soho area of London with his suit off and his tie wrapped around his head. In the end of the video, where the man is wearing a Pendulum / Breakbeat Kaos shirt, he gets his stereo and his bag stolen; in an attempt to try to get them back, the man accidentally slams into a street pole, ending the song. The video also features cameo appearances by the members of Pendulum.

== Track listing ==
12-inch vinyl single, picture disc
(BBK011; released 19 September 2005)

A. "Slam" – 5:45
AA. "Out Here" – 6:07

CD single
(BBK011SCD; released 19 September 2005)

1. "Slam" (radio edit) – 3:35
2. "Slam" (original) – 5:45
3. "Out Here" – 6:07

== Personnel ==
The following people contributed to "Slam" / "Out Here".

- Rob Swire – songwriting, production, vocals, synthesiser, guitar, mixing
- Gareth McGrillen – songwriting, production, vocals
- Paul Harding – songwriting, production
- Stuart Hawkes – mastering

== Charts ==
"Slam" / "Out Here" entered the UK Singles Chart on week 39, 2005. It peaked at number 34 before dropping out a week later.

Chart (2005)	Peak position
UK Singles (OCC)	34
UK Dance (OCC)	1

== Certifications ==
Region	Certification	Certified units/sales
United Kingdom (BPI)	Silver	200,000^{‡}
^{‡} Sales+streaming figures based on certification alone.
