= List of UK Dance Singles Chart number ones of 2004 =

These are The Official Charts Company Official UK Dance Chart number one hits of 2004. The dates listed in the menus below represent the Saturday after the Sunday the chart was announced, as per the way the dates are given in chart publications such as the ones produced by Billboard, Guinness, and Virgin.

Issue date	Song	Artist
3 January	"RA"	Shy FX
10 January	"Plastic Dreams"	Jaydee
17 January	"Good Luck"	Basement Jaxx featuring Lisa Kekaula
24 January	"Good Luck"	Basement Jaxx featuring Lisa Kekaula
31 January	"Comfortably Numb"	Scissor Sisters
7 February	"Take Me to the Clouds Above"	LMC vs. U2
14 February	"Da Hype"	Junior Jack featuring Robert Smith
21 February	"Rock Your Body Rock"	Ferry Corsten
28 February	"Rock Your Body Rock"	Ferry Corsten
6 March	"Another Planet / Voyager"	Pendulum
13 March	"Another Planet / Voyager"	Pendulum
20 March	"Get A Life"	Freestylers
27 March	"Aerodynamik"	Kraftwerk
3 April	"Holding Onto Nothing"	Agnelli & Nelson featuring Aureus
10 April	"Plug It In"	Basement Jaxx
17 April	"Crush"	Paul Van Dyk featuring Second Sun
24 April	"Rocking Music"	Martin Solveig
1 May	"Hear My Name"	Armand Van Helden
8 May	"Rocking Music"	Martin Solveig
15 May	"Love Comes Again"	Tiësto featuring BT
22 May	"Love Comes Again"	Tiësto featuring BT
29 May	"Now We Are Free"	Gladiator featuring Izzy
5 June	"Shake Yer Dix"	Peaches
12 June	"Backtogether"	Hardsoul featuring Ron Carroll
19 June	"Pleasure From The Bass"	Tiga
26 June	"Push Up"	Freestylers
3 July	"Stupidisco"	Junior Jack
10 July	"Stupidisco"	Junior Jack
17 July	"Good Luck"	Basement Jaxx featuring Lisa Kekaula
24 July	"Lola's Theme"	Shapeshifters
31 July	"Lola's Theme"	Shapeshifters
7 August	"Lola's Theme"	Shapeshifters
14 August	"Lola's Theme"	Shapeshifters
21 August	"Lola's Theme"	Shapeshifters
28 August	"Put 'Em High"	Stonebridge featuring Therese
4 September	"Stand Up Tall"	Dizzee Rascal
11 September	"My My My"	Armand Van Helden
18 September	"My My My"	Armand Van Helden
25 September	"Call on Me"	Eric Prydz
2 October	"Call On Me"	Eric Prydz
9 October	"Flashdance"	Deep Dish
16 October	"Flashdance"	Deep Dish
23 October	"Flashdance"	Deep Dish
30 October	"Drop the Pressure"	Mylo
6 November	"Drop the Pressure"	Mylo
13 November	"The Weekend"	Michael Gray
20 November	"The Weekend"	Michael Gray
27 November	"The Weekend"	Michael Gray
4 December	"Stay With You"	Lemon Jelly
11 December	"Rocker"	Alter Ego
18 December	"Rocker"	Alter Ego
25 December	"Capture The Flag/Twister"	Fresh

== See also ==
- 2004 in British music
