= Blood Sugar / Axle Grinder =

2007 single by Pendulum

"Blood Sugar"

Single by Pendulum

from the album Hold Your Colour
- Released: 28 May 2007
- Genre: Drum and bass
- Length: 5:17 ("Blood Sugar"); 4:09 ("Axle Grinder")
- Label: Breakbeat Kaos
- Songwriter(s): Rob Swire; Gareth McGrillen; Matt White
- Producer(s): Rob Swire; Matt White

Pendulum singles chronology
"Painkiller" (2006)	"Blood Sugar" (2007)	"Granite" (2007)

"Blood Sugar" is a song by Australian drum and bass band Pendulum, released as a single on 18 June 2007 in the United Kingdom. It was the band's final single with the Breakbeat Kaos label, and was released on 12-inch vinyl. Both tracks were later added to the 2007 reissue of the group's debut album, Hold Your Colour, due to their popularity. "Axle Grinder" contains samples from the United States TV show, The Twilight Zone and when run through a spectrogram; the song contains an image of Porky Pig giving the middle finger at the very end.

== Chart performance ==
"Blood Sugar" / "Axle Grinder" entered the UK Singles Chart on week 25, 2007. It peaked at number 62 before dropping out a week later.

== Remixes and other versions ==
On 13 April 2018, the second teaser from the group's compilation album, The Reworks, was revealed to be a Knife Party remix of "Blood Sugar." But upon its release, the remix immediately received criticism from both listeners and producers, with many comparing it unfavorably to the Noisia remix of Hold Your Colour which debuted in the month prior. Speculation of the remix being a joke had also surfaced, but it was eventually revealed in interviews a year afterwards that the remix was ultimately created "at the last minute" to fill in for a prior contributor.

== Track listing ==
12-inch vinyl single
(BBK020, released 18 June 2007)

A. "Blood Sugar" – 5:17
AA. "Axle Grinder" – 4:09

== Certifications ==
Region	Certification	Certified units/sales
United Kingdom (BPI)	Silver	200,000^{‡}
^{‡} Sales+streaming figures based on certification alone.
