= Voodoo People / Out of Space =

"Voodoo People" / "Out of Space"

Single by The Prodigy featuring Pendulum and Audio Bullys

from the album Their Law: The Singles 1990–2005
- A-side: "Voodoo People"; "Out of Space"
- B-side: "Smack My Bitch Up"
- Released: 3 October 2005
- Recorded: Essex, England
- Genre: Drum and bass, electronic rock
- Length: 5:05 "Voodoo People" (remix); 4:56 "Out of Space" (remix)
- Label: XL
- Songwriter: Liam Howlett
- Producer: Liam Howlett

Alternative cover
- Cover for "Out of Space / Voodoo People"

The Prodigy singles chronology
"Spitfire" (2005)	"Voodoo People" / "Out of Space" (2005)	"Invaders Must Die" (2008)

Pendulum singles chronology
"Slam" / "Out Here" (2005)	""Voodoo People" (Pendulum remix)" (2005)	"Hold Your Colour" / "Streamline" (2006)

"Voodoo People" / "Out of Space" is the seventeenth single released by the British dance act The Prodigy on 3 October 2005, and was the only single released from their compilation album Their Law: The Singles 1990–2005. The single was released as a double A-side, and peaked at number twenty in the UK Singles Chart.

Most releases featured two remixes, "Voodoo People" remixed by Pendulum and featuring Tom Morello and "Out of Space" remixed by Audio Bullys. Some versions also featured "Smack My Bitch Up" remixed by Sub Focus as a B-side, and other versions of the title tracks. Pendulum's remix of "Voodoo People" was accompanied by a music video, directed by Ron Scalpello.

== Music video ==
Liam Howlett and Maxim Reality in the music video

A music video was produced for Pendulum's remix of "Voodoo People", directed by Ron Scalpello. The video was first aired on 2 July 2005 at 3:00 a.m. and was filmed one scene at a time. It is based on a scene from the Spanish movie Intacto, a film themed around luck and games of chance. The video was filmed in Romford Market in London, England.

The video features several people racing blindfolded, with their hands bound. It could be compared to the video game Frogger, in which all participants must avoid the obstacles within a city. Though, since they could not see the obstacles, it was more of a 'last man standing' game. Several members of the band were spectators in the video, while the winner of the race was Sharky, a former member of The Prodigy who left shortly after the band formed.

== Formats and track listings ==
These are the major formats and associated track listings of single releases of "Voodoo People" / "Out of Space".

12" vinyl single (disc one)
(XLT219; released 3 October 2005)

A. "Voodoo People" (Pendulum remix) – 5:05
B1. "Smack My Bitch Up" (Sub Focus remix) – 5:33
B2. "Out of Space" – 4:57

12" vinyl single (disc two)
(XLR219; released 3 October 2005)

A. "Out of Space" (Audio Bullys remix) – 4:56
B. "Voodoo People" (Wonder remix) – 5:36

CD single
(XLS219CD; released 3 October 2005)

1. "Out of Space" (Audio Bullys remix) – 4:56
2. "Voodoo People" (Pendulum remix) – 5:05

CD maxi single
(XLS219CDA; released 3 October 2005)

1. "Voodoo People" (Pendulum radio edit) – 3:16
2. "Voodoo People" (Wonder remix) – 4:56
3. "Smack My Bitch Up" (Sub Focus remix) – 5:33
4. "Out of Space" (Audio Bullys radio edit) – 3:38
5. "Out of Space" (Audio Bullys remix) – 4:56

Digital single
(iTunes Store; released 3 October 2005)

1. "Voodoo People" (Pendulum remix) – 5:05
2. "Out of Space" (Audio Bullys remix) – 4:56

== Chart performance ==
"Voodoo People" / "Out of Space" entered the UK Singles Chart at number twenty, and the Irish Singles Chart at number 27 on 9 October 2005. The song also peaked at number twenty in the Norwegian singles chart four weeks later on 6 November.

In November 2021, a user on the social media app TikTok, posted a video with this song as the sound. The song has since garnered more popularity amongst many old and new fans.

Charts (2005)	Peak position
Australia (ARIA)	79
Canada (Nielsen SoundScan)	10
Ireland (IRMA)	27
Norway (VG-lista)	20
UK Dance Singles (The Official Charts Company)	1
UK Singles (The Official Charts Company)	20
