= Breakbeat Kaos =

British independent record label

Breakbeat Kaos discography
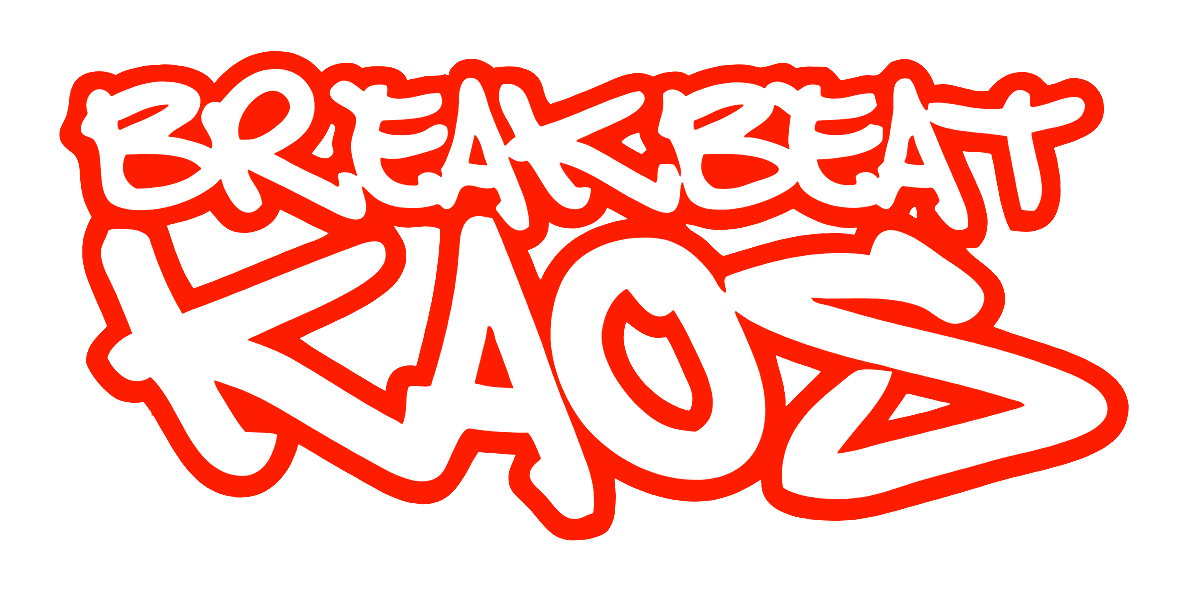
- Breakbeat Kaos logo used since 2003
- Studio albums: 4
- Compilation albums: 3
- Singles: 53

Breakbeat Kaos is a British independent record label based in London, that specialises in drum and bass. It is jointly owned by Fresh and Adam F, who founded the label in 2003 by merging Fresh's Breakbeat Punk with Adam F's Kaos Recordings. The label's first release was a 12" double A-side single by Fresh titled "Dalicks / Temple of Doom". The following year the label released the single "Another Planet / Voyager" by Pendulum, which peaked at number one in the UK Dance Chart. They also produced their first full-length release with the compilation album Jungle Sound: The Bassline Strikes Back!.

Starting in 2005, Breakbeat Kaos has released studio album debuts from Pendulum, Fresh and J Majik & Wickaman. The first of these, the Pendulum album Hold Your Colour, was later certified gold, exceeding 225,000 sales in the UK alone. The label has also released singles by artists including Baron, who has gone on to score action sports films in the United States, Chase & Status, D.Kay and Future Prophecies. Since its foundation, Breakbeat Kaos has released 31 singles and four albums from more than thirteen artists, in addition to fourteen singles released through its sublabels, Under Construction and Dogs on Acid.

The label has also spawned a thriving online community of fans and producers through the medium of the Dogs on Acid forums. These forums have been used by various people associated with the label, including Pendulum and Adam F, in order to communicate with their target audience.

Breakbeat Kaos stopped releasing music in 2012, but in 2018 the label was brought back into operation.

== Discography ==
=== Albums ===
Year	No.	Artist	Title	Co-labels
2004	BBK001CD	Adam F & Fresh	Jungle Sound: The Bassline Strikes Back!	N/A
2005	BBK002CD	Pendulum	Hold Your Colour	N/A
2006	BBK003CD	Fresh	Escape from Planet Monday	System Recordings
2008	BBK004CD	J Majik & Wickaman	Crazy World	Black Widow; Infrared
2008	BBK005CD	Various Artists	Breakbeat Kaos Presents - Stadium Drum & Bass	N/A
2010	BBK006CD	Fresh	Kryptonite	N/A
2011	BBK007CD	The Brookes Brothers	The Brookes Brothers	N/A
2018	BBK1015CD	Various Artists	Jungle Sound: Revenge Of The Bass (15 Years Of Breakbeat Kaos)	N/A

=== Singles ===
Year	No.	Artist	Title
2003	1	Fresh	"Dalicks / Temple of Doom"
2004	2	Fresh & Adam F	Jungle Sound EP
2004	3	Pendulum	"Another Planet / Voyager"
2004	4	Fresh	"Submarines"
2004	5	Fresh & Adam F	"When the Sun Goes Down"
2005	6	Fresh & Baron	"Supernature"
2005	7	Distorted Minds	"Give It to Me / Stay Focused"
2005	8	Baron & Pendulum	"Guns at Dawn"
2005	9	Pendulum	"Tarantula / Fasten Your Seatbelt"
2005	10	Adam F	"8Ball"
2005	11	Pendulum	"Slam / Out Here"
2005	12	Chase & Status	"Duppy Man / Top Shotta"
2005	13	Drumsound & Bassline Smith	"Killa DJ"
2006	14	Baron	"At the Drive In / Decade"
2006	15	Fresh	"The Immortal / Living Daylights Pt 2"
2006	16	Pendulum	"Hold Your Colour / Streamline"
2006	17	Fresh	"Nervous"
2006	18	Baron	"At the Drive In / St. Elmo"
2007	19	Brookes Brothers	"Hard Knocks / Mistakes"
2007	20	Pendulum	"Blood Sugar / Axle Grinder"
2007	21	Future Prophecies	"The Roof Is on Fire / Dreadlock"
2007	22	Fresh	"Scream"
2007	23	Baron	"Endless Summer / Dr. Agnostic"
2008	24	Brookes Brothers & Futurebound	"F Zero / Dawntreader"
2008	25	Fresh	"Clap / Exhale"
2008	26	Baron	"Turn Up the Sun / Blinking with Fists"
2008	27	Fresh	"Gold Dust / The Field"
2008	28	Brookes Brothers	"Tear You Down / Drifter"
2009	29	Nero	"Act Like You Know / Sound in Motion"
2009	30	Fresh ft. Stamina MC & Koko	"Hypercaine" (inc Original Edit & Nero Dubstep Mix)
2009	31	Adam F & Horx Feat. Redman	"Shut The Lights Off"
2010	32	Camo & Krooked	"Can't Get Enough / Without You"
2010	33	Fresh	"Talkbox / Acid Rain"
2010	34	Sigma	"Stand Tall EP: Part 1" (Front To Back (Original Sin Remix) / Baltimore (Instrumental))
2010	35	WTF?! ft. Dead Prez	"It's Bigger Than Hip Hop UK (Dubbed Out Mix) / (Full Vocal Mix)"
2010	36	Sigma	"Stand Tall EP: Part 2" (Stronger / The Jungle)
2010	37	Fresh vs. Sigma	"Lassitude / Cylon"
2010	37R	Fresh vs. Sigma	"Lassitude (Jakwob / Sigma VIP Remixes)"
2010	38	Pendulum	"The Island" EP
2010	39	Pendulum	"Witchcraft (Rob Swire's Drumstep Mix / Netsky Remix)"
2010	40	The Brookes Brothers	"Last Night / War Cry"
2011	41	The Brookes Brothers	"Beautiful" (ft. Robert Owens) / Souvenir
2011	42	The Brookes Brothers	"In Your Eyes (ft. Johnny Osbourne) / The Big Blue"
2011	43	Pixel Fist	"Seduction / Tweaky"
2012	44	Adam F	"Elements EP"
2012	45	The Brookes Brothers	"LoveLine / The Blues"

== Sublabels ==
=== Dogs on Acid ===
Year	No.	Artist	Title
2004	1	Fresh	"Floodlight"
2007	2	Fatal & DJ Raw	"100 Years / The Hunt"
2007	3	High Rankin' & Wayz	"Alice / Beyond"

=== Under Construction ===
Year	No.	Artist	Title
2005	1	Future Prophecies	"Thunder & Lightning / Deceived"
2005	2	D.Kay & DJ Lee	"Rain / Take Some Time"
2005	3	Duo Infernale	"Positive Vibes / Pipe Dreams"
2006	4	Chris Paul & Mia V	"All Alone / Liquid Palm"
2006	5	TKO	"Cheese on Toast / Feelin"
2006	6	Chris Paul & Mia V	"Portuguese Living / Make Noise"
2006	7	Social Security	"Children of the Sun / Warm Bass Rising"
2007	8	Santorin	"Supernatural / Return of Tomorrow"
2007	9	Dan Marshall	"Remember Me / Gomen Nasai"
2007	10	Dan Marshall	"Dreamcatcher / Side Step"
2007	11	Cybass	"The Way of the Rasta / Laughing Man"
