= Spiral (Pendulum song) =

"Spiral" / "Ulterior Motive"

Single by Pendulum
- Released: 10 July 2003 (New Zealand); 1 March 2004 (various)
- Genre: Drum and bass
- Length: 6:28 ("Spiral"); 6:10 ("Ulterior Motive")
- Label: Low Profile; Uprising Records
- Songwriter(s): Rob Swire; Gareth McGrillen; Paul Harding

Pendulum singles chronology
"Vault" (2003)	"Spiral" / "Ulterior Motive" (2003)	"Another Planet" / "Voyager" (2004)

"Spiral" / "Ulterior Motive" is the first single by drum and bass band Pendulum. It was initially released on 10 July 2003, while the band were still based in Perth, as a promotional single by Kog Transmissions' sublabel Low Profile. The single was made publicly available on 1 March 2004 by Concord Dawn's label Uprising Records, with the same track listing as the promotional record. The record was released worldwide distributed by LOAD Media and is one of Uprising Records' highest selling singles.

== Critical reception ==
The single has received critical reviews. One review describes "Ulterior Motive" as "not a show-stopper, [it] could be worked into a few different sets, and comes across like a fun dancefloor tune", but also describes sections of "Spiral" as "an epic crowd pleaser".

== Track listing ==
12-inch vinyl promo
(LPO009; released 10 July 2003)

A. "Spiral" – 6:28
AA. "Ulterior Motive" – 6:10

12-inch vinyl single
(RISE002; released 1 March 2004)

A. "Spiral" – 6:28
AA. "Ulterior Motive" – 6:10

== Personnel ==
The following people contributed to "Spiral / Ulterior Motive".

- Rob Swire – writer, producer, vocals, mixing
- Gareth McGrillen – writer, producer
- Paul Harding – writer, producer
- Neil Devine – mastering
