= Back 2 You / Still Grey =

"Back 2 You" / "Still Grey"

Single by Pendulum

from the album Hold Your Colour
- Released: 22 March 2004 (UK)
- Recorded: England 2003
- Genre: Drum and bass
- Length: 6:26 ("Back 2 You"); 7:49 ("Still Grey")
- Label: Timeless Recordings
- Songwriter(s): Rob Swire; Paul Harding; Gareth McGrillen
- Producer(s): Swire; Harding; McGrillen

Pendulum singles chronology
"Another Planet" / "Voyager" (2004)	"Back 2 You" / "Still Grey" (2004)	"Guns at Dawn" (2005)

"Back 2 You" / "Still Grey" is the third single by Australian drum and bass band Pendulum. It was released on 22 March 2004 by independent label Timeless Recordings, and was their first and only release with the label. The song "Still Grey" featured guest guitarist Evan Short of Concord Dawn, and was included on the CD edition of Hold Your Colour, released in July 2005.

== Background and writing ==
Both tracks of "Back 2 You" / "Still Grey" were written and produced by Rob Swire and Paul Harding, "Back 2 You" was also written and produced by Gareth McGrillen. The single was the first release by Pendulum to feature either a guest instrumentalist, or a guest vocalist. The song "Back 2 You" featured singer Lisa Lindt, while the electric guitar in "Still Grey" was played by Evan Killjoy, better known as Evan Short of New Zealand drum and bass duo Concord Dawn.

== Critical reception ==
Unlike Pendulum's previous single, "Back 2 You" / "Still Grey" did not receive much publicity or recognition, and consequently neither track has been subject to many critical reviews. This is particularly true of "Back 2 You", which has not been featured on any studio or compilation album released by Pendulum to date. One review of Hold Your Colour describes "Still Grey" as "chilled but entertaining", although the reviewer gripes that "after such a powerful intro, [he] was hoping for a dramatic exeunt and what they deliver is a cool fade out". Another review describes the song as "a fantastic piece of liquid dancefloor action".

== Marketing and release ==
"Back 2 You" / "Still Grey" was released on 22 March 2004 as a standard 12-inch single by independent label Timeless Recordings. It was Pendulum's first and only release with the label to date, which has also released material for guest guitarist Evan Short's band, Concord Dawn. The song "Still Grey" was featured on the CD edition of Hold Your Colour, released in July 2005, but was later replaced by the song "Axle Grinder" when the album was reissued in July 2007. "Back 2 You" was not included on any other release by Pendulum, but was featured on two compilation albums including Drum & Bass Arena, mixed by Andy C.

== Track listing ==
This is the track listing for "Back 2 You" / "Still Grey". "Back 2 You" was written and produced by Rob Swire, Paul Harding, and Gareth McGrillen. "Still Grey" was written and produced by Rob Swire and Paul Harding.

12-inch vinyl single
(TYME027; released 22 March 2004)

A. "Back 2 You" – 6:26
AA. "Still Grey" – 7:49

== Personnel ==
The following people contributed to "Back 2 You" / "Still Grey".

Pendulum

- Rob Swire – writer, producer, vocals, mixing
- Paul Harding – writer, producer
- Gareth McGrillen – writer, producer

Other contributors

- Lisa Lindt – vocals on "Back 2 You"
- Evan Short – guitar on "Still Grey"
- Stuart Hawkes – mastering
