= Securitas (disambiguation) =

Securitas was the goddess of security and stability, especially the security of the Roman Empire.

Securitas may also refer to:

- Securitas (Swedish security company), also known as Securitas AB
- Securitas (Swiss security company), also known as Securitas AG

== See also ==
- Securitas depot robbery, cash robbery in England in 2006
- Security (disambiguation)
