= Piers Baron =

English Music Artist

- Born: Piers Baron; 29 October 1983 (age 42)
- Origin: Oxford, England
- Genres: Electronic; Pop; Soundtrack; Contemporary Classical
- Occupations: Producer; musician
- Instruments: Piano, Guitar, Orchestra, Logic Pro, Ableton Live, MacBook Pro
- Website: piersbaron.com

Piers Baron (born 29 October 1983) is an English Musical Artist and Composer. He has worked with Annie Leibovitz, David Blaine, Spike Jonze, Robbie Williams, DJ Fresh, Pendulum, Diane Warren, Glen Ballard, Maejor, Gran Turismo Sport, HBO, Jetman - "Young Feathers", Nike - "Never Not Part 2", and Cher. He is best known for his cinematic music production, particularly in drum and bass, soundtracks and pop.

== Career ==
=== Drum and bass ===
Producing music under the name "Baron", he joined up with Breakbeat Kaos and was known for dance-floor tracks, releasing "At the Drive In". His drum and bass records were featured on BBC Radio 1, and were successful on the UK Dance chart, with a number one hit, seven top tens and six top three hits. He scored a number 1 on the UK Dance Singles Chart with his track "Drive In, Drive By". Drum and bass musician Goldie ranked "Drive In, Drive By" as an all-time jungle and drum & bass great. "Operation Pipe Dream" by Baron has been cited by Skrillex as the driving force to him becoming a DJ.

=== Soundtrack ===
Piers Baron has worked extensively in the soundtrack genre. His credits include multiple collaborations with Annie Leibovitz, David Blaine's Live, Oymplic Gold Medalist, Laura Dahlmeier Gran Turismo Sport, Nike's Never Not Part 2, Jetman's Young Feathers, Teton Gravity Research's Accomplice, Red Bull's The Fourth Phase, HBO's Cries from Syria, the Ty Evans-directed The Flat Earth, We Are Blood, The Last Maniac, Unbeleafable 3D, and Absinthe Films' Resonance.

== Discography ==
=== Singles (as Piers Baron) ===
- 2026 - "Farewell, My Friend"
- 2025 - "D'Este, Part 1"
- 2025 - "Beneath Our Regal Moon"
- 2025 - "Good Morning, Midnight"
- 2025 - "Superbloom"
- 2025 - "Hope Is Our Next Dream (Intro)"
- 2020 - "First Light"
- 2018 - "Planet Phatt" (music from The Flat Earth - original motion picture soundtrack)
- 2017 - "Majesty" (music from The Flat Earth - original motion picture soundtrack)
- 2017 - "Broken" (music from The Flat Earth - original motion picture soundtrack)
- 2017 - "Lost Souls Make It"
- 2017 - "Sentinel"
- 2016 - "Race to Be Human"
- 2016 - "The Last Night on Earth"
- 2015 - "As Our Witness"
- 2015 - "Cold Call"
- 2014 - "Underwater Universe"

=== Soundtracks (as Piers Baron) ===
- 2020 - Accomplice by Teton Gravity Research (original soundtrack composer)
- 2017 - The Flat Earth by Ghost Digital Cinema (original soundtrack composer)
- 2017 - Cries from Syria by HBO (credits song producer w/ Diane Warren & Cher)
- 2017 - Gran Turismo Sport by Sony (original soundtrack composer)
- 2016 - The Fourth Phase by Red Bull (original soundtrack composer)
- 2016 - The Last Maniac by Ghost Digital Cinema (original soundtrack composer)
- 2015 - Gran Turismo Sport by Sony (original soundtrack composer)
- 2015 - We Are Blood by Brainfarm (original soundtrack composer)
- 2015 - Jetman Young Feathers by X Dubai (original soundtrack composer)
- 2013 - Never Not Part 2 by Nike (original soundtrack composer)

=== Live ===
- 2017/18 - David Blaine Live (original soundtrack composer)

=== Production ===
- 2019 - Maejor - "Nirvana" - (co-wrote and produced)
- 2017 - Cher - "Prayers For This World" - music from HBO's Cries From Syria (produced)
- 2017 - Robbie Williams - "Eyes on The Highway" (co-wrote, produced and mixed)
- 2017 - Robbie Williams - "Bambi" (co-wrote, produced and mixed)
- 2017 - Robbie Williams - "International Entertainment" (co-wrote, produced and mixed)

=== Singles (with Bleitch) ===
- 2014 - "This is Our Youth" (co-wrote, produced and mixed)
- 2015 - "Paint by Numbers" (co-wrote, produced and mixed)
- 2015 - "Crime" (co-wrote, produced and mixed)
- 2015 - "Speaking of Moments" (co-wrote, produced and mixed)

=== Singles (with Maize) ===
- 2016 - "Remember to Lose"
- 2016 - "Out to Find Love"
- 2016 - "I Like You"

=== Remixes (with Maize) ===
- 2015 - Marina and the Diamonds - "Blue" (MAIZE) remix
- 2015 - MS MR - "Criminals" (MAIZE) remix
- 2015 - Gwen Stefani - "Used to Love You" (MAIZE) remix
- 2016 - Alex Newell - "Basically Over You" (MAIZE) remix
- 2016 - All Saints - "This is a War" (MAIZE) remix

=== Drum and bass (as Baron) ===
- "The Way It Was" / "Redhead" UKDance No. 2
- "Supernature" (with Fresh) UKDance No. 3
- 'Guns at Dawn" (with Pendulum) UKDance No. 3
- "At The Drive In" / "Decade" UKDance No. 3
- "Drive In, Drive By" / "St. Elmo" UKDance No. 1
- "Endless Summer" / "Dr. Agnostic" UKDance No. 3
- "Turn up the Sun" / "Blinking with Fists" UKDance No. 4
