= Fourth Floor Collapse =

Australian rock band

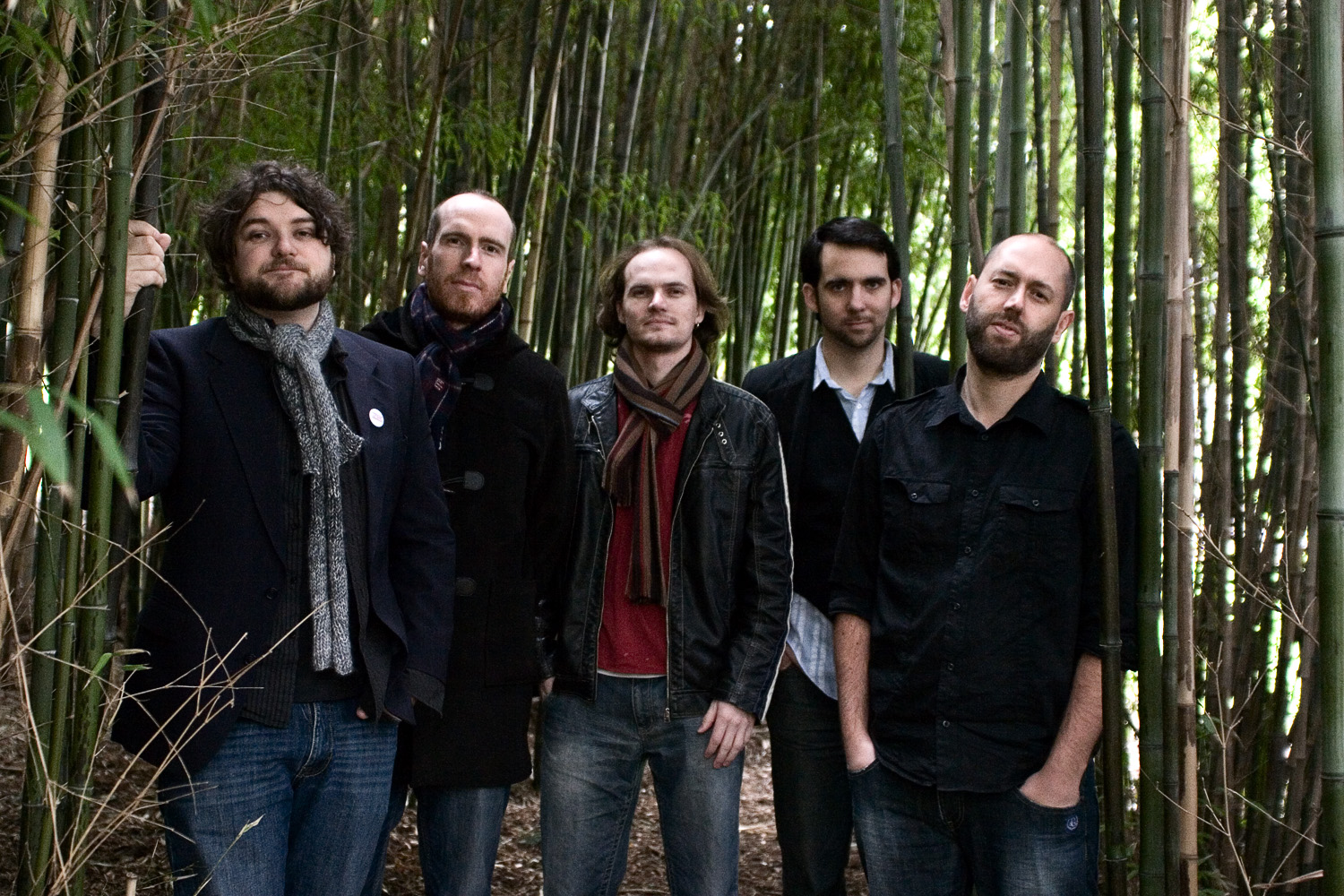
- Fourth Floor Collapse

Background information
- Origin: Perth, Australia
- Genres: Rock; Indie rock
- Years active: 1998–present
- Label: Creative Vibes
- Members: Jesse Delaney; Dan Forrestal; Rhys Kealley; Michael Miller; Michael Parker
- Past members: see members list below
- Website: Official website

Fourth Floor Collapse is a Melbourne-based rock band.

== History ==
Fourth Floor Collapse originated in the northern suburbs of Perth, Western Australia, playing their first show at the Rosemount Hotel in 1998.

Michael and Rhys actually met at play group way back when and I met Michael at high school. I was in half a band and we were looking for a singer and Michael and Rhys were kind of half a band and needed a bass player. We got together and went from there. We lived a suburb apart – it just seemed logical that we get together

— Dan Forrestal

They became the most awarded unsigned band in Australia, taking out the Next Big Thing Competition in 1999 and winning ten Western Australian Music Industry Awards, including Most Popular Local Original Rock Act (2002). The band released its debut recording Plans for Dream Homes in 2000 on the QStik Records label and its debut album, Half Deserted Streets in 2001 on Congregation Records.

In 2003 Fourth Floor Collapse released its second album, From the Cold, for which it received extensive airplay on Triple J and public radio around the country, with tracks such as "Made Believe", "Sun", and "Stories Unglued".

Frustrated by the isolation of Perth the three main songwriters, Dan Forrestal, Rhys Kealley and Michael Miller relocated to Melbourne in 2005 adding bass player, Jesse Delaney and drummer Michael Parker.

We'd seen a lot of bands who'd left Perth, and disappeared. It scared the hell out of us, but we got to the point where we had to do something to move forward. If we could stay in WA then we would but we can't afford it - especially touring. We would get over to the east two or three times every year, and whatever buzz we could generate would dissipate before we could capitalise on it.

— Dan Forrestal

The group signed to Creative Vibes with whom they recorded and released their third album Books with Broken Spines in 2006. Singles released from this album were, "Drink 'til You Drown", "Occupation" and "Ashes". The release was followed by heavy touring by the band and by the beginning of 2008 they had clocked up over 250 shows. They commenced recording their fourth album in early 2008.

We began work on this album at the beginning of the year. It has been two years since our last release, and two years seems like a long time to me. If I could, I would get stuff out every year.

— Dan Forrestal

The album, Victoria, was recorded in Melbourne; mixed in Perth by Andy Lawson (Little Birdy, Eskimo Joe & End of Fashion) and Joel Quartermain (Eskimo Joe); and mastered in Sydney, it was released on 13 October 2008.

We feel like an exile band, a Western Australian band in Victoria

— Dan Forrestal

== Members ==
- Nigel Bird — drums (??)
- Jesse Delaney — bass (2005–present)
- Dan Forrestal — guitar, mandolin, piano, vocals (1998–present)
- Nathan Gaunt — bass (2003)
- Rhys Kealley — guitar, piano, melodica, vocals (1998–present)
- Russell Loasby — drums (2004)
- Trent McKenzie — bass (2006)
- Leigh Miller — bass (2003–2004)
- Michael Miller — lead vocal, acoustic guitar, piano (1998–present)
- Scott Mesiti — bass (2005)
- Scott O'Donoghue — bass, keyboards (1998–2003)
- Michael Parker — drums (2005–present)
- Sean Pollard — bass (2004)
- Mike Rouse — drums (1998–2004)
- Anto Smyth — drums (2004)

== Discography ==
=== Albums ===
Title	Details
Half Deserted Streets	Released: May 2001; Label: Congregation (conffc0001); Format: CD digital download
From the Cold	Released: October 2003; Label: Congregation (conffc0005); Format: CD digital download
Books with Broken Spines	Released: January 2006; Label: Congregation (conffc0011); Format: CD digital download
Victoria	Released: October 2008; Label: Congregation (conffc0013); Format: CD digital download
New Ruins	Released: April 2023

=== EPs ===
Title	Details
Half Deserted Streets	Released: March 2000; Label: QStik Records (QSFFC0006); Format: CD digital download

=== Singles ===
Title	Year	Album
"Made Believe"	2001	Half Deserted Streets
"One Last Arrow"	2001	Half Deserted Streets
"Sun"	2003	From the Cold
"Night Under Lights"	2003	From the Cold
"Stories Unglued"	2004	From the Cold
"Godspeed"	2004	
"Drink 'til you Drown"	2006	Books With Broken Spines
"Occupation"	2006	Books With Broken Spines
"Ashes"	2006	Books With Broken Spines

== Awards and nominations ==
=== WAM Song of the Year ===
The WAM Song of the Year was formed by the Western Australian Rock Music Industry Association Inc. (WARMIA) in 1985, with its main aim to develop and run annual awards recognising achievements within the music industry in Western Australia.

Year	Nominee / work	Award	Result
2001		Pop Song of the Year	Won

=== Western Australian Music Industry Awards ===
The Western Australian Music Industry Awards (commonly known as WAMis) are annual awards presented to the local contemporary music industry, put on by the Western Australian Music Industry Association Inc (WAM). Fourth Floor Collapse won five awards.

Year	Nominee / work	Award	Result (wins only)
2001	Half Deserted Streets	Most Popular Local Original Recorded Release	Won
2001	Fourth Floor Collapse	Most Popular Local Original Band Website	Won
2001	Fourth Floor Collapse	Most Popular Original Rock Act	Won
2001	Michael Miller (Fourth Floor Collapse)	Most Popular Male Original Vocalist	Won
2002	Fourth Floor Collapse	Most Popular Original Rock Act	Won
