= Tarantula / Fasten Your Seatbelt =

"Tarantula" / "Fasten Your Seatbelt"

Single by Pendulum featuring The Freestylers and Fresh

from the album Hold Your Colour
- Released: 27 June 2005 (UK)
- Recorded: 2004–2005
- Genre: Drum and bass; Dancehall
- Length: 5:31 ("Tarantula"); 6:38 ("Fasten Your Seatbelt")
- Label: Breakbeat Kaos (BBK009A)
- Songwriters: Rob Swire; Gareth McGrillen; Dan Stein; Matt Cantor; Aston Harvey
- Producers: Pendulum; Fresh; The Freestylers

Pendulum featuring The Freestylers and Fresh singles chronology
"Guns at Dawn" (2005)	"Tarantula" / "Fasten Your Seatbelt" (2005)	"Slam" / "Out Here" (2005)

"Tarantula" / "Fasten Your Seatbelt" is the fourth single by Australian drum and bass band Pendulum. It was released on 27 June 2005 by independent label Breakbeat Kaos and was their second release with the label. While "Fasten Your Seatbelt" features production from The Freestylers, "Tarantula" features production from Fresh and vocals from $pyda, together with Tenor Fly from The Freestylers. It peaked number 60 on the UK Singles Chart. Both songs were included on the CD release of Hold Your Colour a month later. "Fasten Your Seatbelt" samples a line from Spider-Man 2 where Otto Octavius is firing up the fusion reactor for the first time ("Ladies and gentlemen, fasten your seatbelts"), as well as the sound the reactor made when it was being primed.

== Background ==
The song sampled a segment from the Discovery Channel series The World's Most Feared Animals. This sample was reused in Centipede.

== Track listing ==
These are the major formats and associated track listings of single releases of "Tarantula" / "Fasten Your Seatbelts". Both tracks were written and produced by Rob Swire.

12-inch vinyl single, picture disc
(BBK009A; released 27 June 2005)

A. "Tarantula" – 5:31
AA. "Fasten Your Seatbelt" – 6:38

CD single
(BBK009SCD; released 27 June 2005)

1. "Tarantula" (radio edit) – 3:25
2. "Fasten Your Seatbelt" – 6:38
3. "Tarantula" (Serial Killer mix) – 3:53

== Personnel ==
The following people contributed to "Tarantula" / "Fasten Your Seatbelt".

Pendulum

- Rob Swire – songwriting, production, synthesiser
- Gareth McGrillen – songwriting and production on "Tarantula"

Other contributors

- Dan "Fresh" Stein – songwriting and production on "Tarantula"
- Colin "$pyda" Griffith – vocals on "Tarantula"
- Jack Adams – mastering

The Freestylers

- Matt Cantor – songwriting and additional production on "Fasten Your Seatbelt"
- Aston Harvey – songwriting and additional production on "Fasten Your Seatbelt"
- Jonathan "Tenor Fly" Sutter – vocals on "Tarantula"

== Charts ==
"Tarantula" / "Fasten Your Seatbelt" entered the UK Singles Chart on week 27, 2005. It peaked at number 60 before dropping out a week later.

Chart (2005)	Peak position
UK Singles Chart	60
UK Dance (Official Charts)	1

== Certifications ==
Region	Certification	Certified units/sales
New Zealand (RMNZ)	Platinum	30,000^{‡}
United Kingdom (BPI)	Gold	400,000^{‡}
^{‡} Sales+streaming figures based on certification alone.

== In other media ==
"Tarantula" can be heard in the episode seven, series two of Skins when Effy, Tony and Pandora enter to the club followed by Sid's artistic scene. It is also featured in the soundtrack for the 2008 PS3 Racing game, MotorStorm: Pacific Rift. “Fasten Your Seatbelts” was played during Season 2 Episode 6 of Ideal during Moz's party.
