= Hold Your Colour (song) =

"Hold Your Colour (Bipolar Vocal Mix)"

Single by Pendulum

from the album Hold Your Colour
- Released: 13 February 2006 (digital); 6 March 2006 (CD and vinyl)
- Genre: Drum and bass; electronic rock
- Length: 5:30 (album version); 3:33 (radio edit); 5:25 ("Streamline")
- Label: Breakbeat Kaos (BBK016)
- Songwriter(s): Rob Swire
- Producer(s): Rob Swire

Pendulum singles chronology
""Voodoo People" (Pendulum remix)" (2005)	"Hold Your Colour (Bipolar Vocal Mix)" (2006)	"Painkiller" (2006)

"Hold Your Colour" is a song by Australian drum and bass band Pendulum, released as the fifth single from their debut album Hold Your Colour, and their eighth single overall. It was released as a double A-side by Breakbeat Kaos on 6 March 2006 in the UK. The single features two tracks from the album – a remix of "Hold Your Colour" and "Streamline". The song "Hold Your Colour" features guest guitarist Andrew Goddard and bassist Jon Stockman of Perth band Karnivool. The Bipolar mix of "Hold Your Colour" was featured on the soundtrack of FIFA Street 2. According to Rob Swire, the intro vocal sample in "Hold Your Colour" ("Soaking through...") was taken from a track by Rob, Pendulum member Gareth McGrillen and ShockOne's old band Xygen. The track was titled "Lycaeum". Some lyrics from "Lycaeum" were used in Hold Your Colour.

== Track listing ==
These are the formats and associated track listings of single releases of "Hold Your Colour" / "Streamline".

Digital single
(iTunes Store; released 13 February 2006)

1. "Hold Your Colour" (Bipolar radio edit) – 3:33
2. "Hold Your Colour" (Bipolar vocal mix) – 4:13

12" vinyl single
(BBK016; released 6 March 2006)

A. "Hold Your Colour" (Bipolar vocal mix) – 4:13
AA. "Streamline" – 5:25

CD single
(BBK016SCD; released 6 March 2006)

1. "Hold Your Colour" (radio edit) – 3:33
2. "Hold Your Colour" (Bipolar vocal mix) – 4:13
3. "Hold Your Colour" – 5:30
4. "Streamline" – 5:25

== Personnel ==
The following people contributed to "Hold Your Colour" / "Streamline".

- Rob Swire – writer, producer, vocals, synthesiser, mixing
- Andrew Goddard – guitar on "Hold Your Colour"
- Jon Stockman – bass on "Hold Your Colour"
- Stuart Hawkes – mastering
