= D*Minds =

- Origin: England, United Kingdom
- Genres: Drum and bass
- Occupation(s): DJ, producer, remixer, record label owner
- Instruments: Synthesizer; keyboard; piano; digital audio workstation; programming
- Years active: 1997–present
- Labels: D-Style Recordings, Stereotype, RUN
- Members: Alistair Vickery, Jon Midwinter
- Website: Rundnb.co.uk

D*Minds (formerly Distorted Minds) are the British drum and bass producers & DJs Alistair Vickery & Jon Midwinter.

From their legendary RUN raves to their award-winning trailer scores via years of incendiary d’n’b club records, D*Minds operations run deep in all directions. But one thread runs consistently through every benchmark they've set; their dedication to their craft.

Minds over matter: Alistair Vickery and Jon Midwinter's sights have been set high since they emerged in the late 90s right in the thick of Bristol's most explosive musical movement and swiftly became a prominent force in the new wave of Bristol's rich breakbeat culture throughout the whole of the 2000s to this day. Seminal releases and collaborations such as 'T-10’, 'Give It To Me', 'Jump' and 'Mr Happy’ (to name a few) had a major influence on the genre and have become heavily drawn for anthems to this day. As the label that gave the world d’n’b major league heavyweight TC and key productions from the likes of S.P.Y and Marky, DJ Hazard and Jakes, their D-Style imprints and sister labels Hench and Stereotype had the same impact.

Then there's RUN; a cult Bristol event inspired by Metalheadz iconic Blue Note sessions that ran weekly from 2006 – 2009. Boosting the city's hedonistic Native venue with added soundsystem weight, RUN built up its own community and was renowned for having such a tight, lively vibe even the bouncers would lean over the decks and pull up a rewind. Like everything D*Minds do, RUN was built to last and is now one Bristol's longest running and largest d’n’b raves. At home in Motion – regarded by Mixmag and DJ Mag as one of the UK's best clubs – RUN ALL DAY events have become mini festivals that attract thousands of ravers from the UK and beyond. The brand has become such a phenomenon RUN ALL DAY events are known run over two weekends and the brand also operates label of the same name. It launched with one of the 2018's most distinctive tracks 'Creeper’ from Critical Impact, Break and Skibadee and is responsible for new material from D*Minds and any rising talents they want to support and develop. Now with RUN established as both one of the UK's most trusted raves and the new label, D*Minds have returned to the craft that originally inspired them and triggered this whole journey in the first place. Touring more as DJs and unleashing more of their incendiary records than they have since the mid-2010s, D*Minds operations have never run so deep or so dedicated.
