= The Beat Club =

American electronic music project

- Origin: Miami, Florida, U.S.
- Genres: Electro, synth-pop, electronic dance music
- Years active: 1987–present
- Labels: HR, Atlantic, Rob's Records, Electrobeat
- Members: Honorato "Ony" Rodriguez; Mireya Valls
- Website: www.electrobeat.com

The Beat Club is an American electronic music project from Miami, Florida, founded in 1987 by producer Honorato "Ony" Rodriguez. It later developed as a duo with vocalist Mireya Valls. The project is best known for the single "Security", which became a dance-club success in the United States and Europe, appeared on Billboard's dance charts in 1988, and reached number 92 on the UK Singles Chart in 1989.

== History ==
Before the Beat Club, Rodriguez played in the Miami progressive rock trio UHF, which released the album Timeless Voyager in 1981. After UHF disbanded, he launched the HR label and issued the solo EP Ony in 1983. The release sold respectably and drew comparisons to Orchestral Manoeuvres in the Dark.

By the mid-1980s, Rodriguez had joined Sal Hanono and later David Hanono in Voice in Fashion. The group's second single, "Only in the Night", became a local and national hit, led to a deal with Atlantic Records in 1986, and established the band on the club circuit. Voice in Fashion later moved to EMI-Manhattan, which released "Give Me Your Love" in 1988; that single also received dance-chart attention.

Rodriguez began the Beat Club as a side project while still in Voice in Fashion. The project first emerged in 1987 with the single "Dreamworld", released on HR.

The Beat Club's breakthrough came with "Security", on which Rodriguez was joined by Valls, then his girlfriend and later his wife. In contemporary coverage, Black Radio Exclusive described the record as "pure Dance music", while James Hamilton in Music Week highlighted it in UK dance coverage as a "latin hip hop" electro track.

"Security" became a favorite at The Haçienda in Manchester and led to a collaboration with Bernard Sumner of New Order. Sumner contributed vocals to a European remix of the track, which reached number 92 on the UK Singles Chart in November 1989. The remix became the first release on Rob's Records, the label founded by New Order manager Rob Gretton, who also became Rodriguez's manager. It was followed on the label by the Beat Club singles "Dreams Were Made to Be Broken" and "X".

After the Beat Club's Atlantic contract expired, Rodriguez left Voice in Fashion and returned to independent release. HR was later renamed Electrobeat, which became the home label for the Beat Club and related Rodriguez projects.

The Beat Club's first full-length album, Paris, was released in 1994 after an earlier Rob's Records issue did not materialize. Later releases included Robotica (2006), Minimalista (2008), Pulse (2010), Killing Science (2015), and Altered Beats (2018).

In the 2020s, the project increasingly emphasized stand-alone digital singles. Releases from this period included "Elevate" (2020), "Flamingo" (2023), "The Chase" (2024), "Even at the Quietest Moment" (2025), and "Beyond the Noise" (2025). The project's official YouTube channel also carried music videos for recent singles.

== Reception and legacy ==
The Miami New Times later described "Security" as a "classic record" that connected Miami freestyle and electro to the emerging early rave sound in England. On the official FAC51 website, former Haçienda DJ Mike Pickering included the track in a playlist of records associated with the club's Nude nights and wrote that it "bridged the gap from electro to house perfectly".

"Security" later appeared on the retrospective compilation The Haçienda Classics and on John Digweed's 2005 compilation Choice: A Collection of Classics. Bernard Sumner's remix was later anthologized on the box set New Order Presents Be Music.

== Discography ==
=== Studio albums ===
- Paris (1994)
- Robotica (2006)
- Minimalista (2008)
- Pulse (2010)
- Killing Science (2015)
- Altered Beats (2018)

=== Compilation albums ===
- Electrobeat... Anthology (2015)

=== EPs ===
- All the Cowboys (2012)
- Instruments of Destruction (2013)
- Security (2013)

=== Selected singles ===
- "Dreamworld" (1987)
- "Security" (1988)
- "Dreams Were Made to Be Broken" (1990)
- "X" (1990)
- "Dream Within a Dream" (2003)
- "Lost in Space" (2003)
- "Elevate" (2020)
- "Flamingo" (2023)
- "The Chase" (2024)
- "Even at the Quietest Moment" (2025)
- "Beyond the Noise" (2025)
