= Hold Your Colour =

Studio album by Pendulum
- Released: 25 July 2005
- Recorded: 2003–2005
- Genres: Drum and bass; breakbeat; jungle; alternative dance; electronic rock
- Length: 79:42
- Label: Breakbeat Kaos
- Producers: Rob Swire; Gareth McGrillen; Paul Harding

Pendulum chronology
Hold Your Colour (2005)	In Silico (2008)

Alternative cover
- 2007 reissue cover

Singles from Hold Your Colour
- 1. "Another Planet / Voyager" Released: 23 February 2004; 2. "Back 2 You / Still Grey" Released: 22 March 2004; 3. "Tarantula / Fasten Your Seatbelt" Released: 27 June 2005; 4. "Slam / Out Here" Released: 19 September 2005; 5. "Hold Your Colour / Streamline" Released: 13 February 2006; 6. "Blood Sugar / Axle Grinder" Released: 18 June 2007

Hold Your Colour is the debut studio album by the Australian drum and bass band Pendulum, released on 25 July 2005 and later reissued in 2007 by Breakbeat Kaos. The album was mastered by Stuart Hawkes at Metropolis in London. The album features collaborations with artists such as the DJs Fresh and TC, the MCs $pyda and Fats, vocalists from bands Freestylers and Halogen, and guitarists from bands Karnivool and Concord Dawn, together with Peredur ap Gwynedd.

== Release ==
Five singles were produced from the album, including "Slam" / "Out Here", the first single by Pendulum to reach the top 40 in the UK Singles Chart. In addition, a non-album single, "Blood Sugar" / "Axle Grinder", released on 18 June 2007, later replaced "Another Planet" and "Still Grey" on the reissue of Hold Your Colour due to its popularity.

Otherwise, the LP was released as a triple 12", and features, together with "Hold Your Colour", all the tracks that did not appear on any single. A promotional LP contained also "Slam" / "Out Here".

The album cover inspired the single cover for the later Pendulum release "Witchcraft".

== Reception ==
The album received very positive critical attention in both Australia and the United Kingdom, becoming one of the best-selling drum and bass albums of all time, along with New Forms by Roni Size. 225,000 copies of Hold Your Colour were sold in the UK. On 25 May 2008, it entered the top 40 of the UK Albums Chart for the first time, peaking at number 29 on 16 August.

"Slam" was featured in the soundtrack for the video game MotorStorm on the PlayStation 3 console, and the Bipolar mix of "Hold your Colour" was featured on "FIFA Street 2", Dance Dance Revolution Universe on the Xbox 360 console and on the premiere episode of Sky1's Gladiators. It has also been picked up by the relaunched Nine's Wide World of Sports as an outro to the show and as a precursor to advertising breaks. The track "Tarantula" was featured in the Australian television drama series Underbelly, in an episode of the UK series Skins and CSI: Miami, and in the soundtrack for the video game MotorStorm: Pacific Rift.

== Track listing ==
Original release
No.	Title	Length
1.	"Prelude"	0:52
2.	"Slam"	5:44
3.	"Plasticworld" (featuring Fats and TC)	6:21
4.	"Fasten Your Seatbelt" (featuring Freestylers)	6:38
5.	"Through the Loop"	6:13
6.	"Sounds of Life" (featuring Jasmine Yee)	5:21
7.	"Girl in the Fire"	4:53
8.	"Tarantula" (Pendulum vs. Fresh, featuring $pyda and Tenor Fly)	5:31
9.	"Out Here"	6:07
10.	"Hold Your Colour"	5:28
11.	"The Terminal"	5:42
12.	"Streamline"	5:23
13.	"Another Planet"	7:38
14.	"Still Grey"	7:51
Total length:		79:42

=== Reissue ===
In the 2007 reissue, "Blood Sugar" and "Axle Grinder" took the place of "Another Planet" and "Still Grey". The reissue also contains gaps of silence at the end of each track. "Plasticworld" is also written as "Plastic World"

2007 reissue
No.	Title	Length
13.	"Blood Sugar"	5:17
14.	"Axle Grinder"	4:10
Total length:		9:27

=== Vinyl ===
The vinyl version has a different track order and omits tracks that were previously released as singles, aside from "Hold Your Colour".

Vinyl edition
No.	Title	Side	Length
1.	"Hold Your Colour"	A	5:28
2.	"Girl in the Fire"	B	4:53
3.	"Through the Loop"	C	6:13
4.	"Plasticworld" (featuring Fats and TC)	D	6:21
5.	"The Terminal"	E	5:42
6.	"Sounds of Life" (featuring Jasmine Yee)	F	5:21
Total length:			33:58

== Personnel ==
Pendulum

- Rob Swire – vocals, guitar, synths, Rhodes, songwriting, production
- Gareth McGrillen – songwriting, production
- Paul Harding – songwriting, production

Brass section

- Pablo Mendlessohn – trumpet on "Plasticworld" and "Tarantula"
- James Morton – alto saxophone on "Plasticworld" and "Tarantula"
- Jonathan Shendy – tenor saxophone on "Plasticworld" and "Tarantula"
- Tim Smart – trombone on "Plasticworld" and "Tarantula"

Additional personnel

- Singing Fats – vocals on "Plasticworld"
- Tom Casswell – vocals, songwriting and additional production on "Plasticworld"
- Matt Cantor – vocals, songwriting and additional production on "Fasten Your Seatbelt"
- Aston Harvey – vocals, songwriting and additional production on "Fasten Your Seatbelt"
- Jasmine Yee – vocals on "Sounds of Life"
- Peredur ap Gwynedd – guitar on "Girl in the Fire"
- Dan "Fresh" Stein – songwriting and additional production on "Tarantula"
- Jonathan "Tenor Fly" Sutter – vocals on "Tarantula"
- Colin "$pyda" Griffith – vocals on "Tarantula"
- Andrew Goddard – guitar on "Hold Your Colour"
- Jon Stockman – bass guitar on "Hold Your Colour"
- Evan Short – guitar on "Still Grey"
- Matt White – songwriting and additional production on "Blood Sugar"
- Stuart Hawkes – mastering

== Samples ==
- The tracks "Prelude", "Slam" and "Axle Grinder" use samples from the American television series The Twilight Zone. Samples similar to those in "Slam" are read aloud in "Rock Civilization" by Headhunterz.
- The track "Fasten Your Seatbelt" uses a sample from the song "Go Home Soundboy" by Buju Banton and Cocoa Tea, and a sample of Doctor Octopus from the film Spider-Man 2.
- The track "Through the Loop" uses samples from the 1971 film Willy Wonka & the Chocolate Factory, and a small section of whale song.
- The track "Hold Your Colour" uses an intro vocal sample from "Lycaeum", a song Rob Swire and Gareth McGrillen made with Karl Thomas (better known later as drum and bass artist "ShockOne") and Jay Burns in Xygen, their former metal band.
- The track "Another Planet" uses samples of Richard Burton from Jeff Wayne's Musical Version of The War of the Worlds and a drum sample from the Megadeth song "Skin o' My Teeth".
- The track "Prelude" is used as a short sample in Los Angeles based radio station KIIS-FM.
- The track "Girl in the Fire" contains a sample from the 1991 song "The Choice is Yours (Revisited)" by Black Sheep.

== Charts ==
Chart (2005–2006)	Peak position
Australian Albums (ARIA)	77
UK Albums (Official Charts)	29
UK Dance Albums (Official Charts)	2
UK Independent Albums (Official Charts)	1

== Certifications ==
Region	Certification	Certified units/sales
Australia (ARIA)	Gold	35,000^{^}
United Kingdom (BPI)	Platinum	300,000^{*}
^{*} Sales figures based on certification alone.^{^} Shipments figures based on certification alone.

== Release history ==
Region	Release date	Format	Catalogue
United Kingdom	25 July 2005	12" LP	BBK002LP
United Kingdom	25 July 2005	12" LP	BBK002LPD
Various	1 August 2005	CD; download	BBK002CD
Various	16 July 2007	CD; download	BBK002CDR
