= Rob Swire =

Australian musician and producer (born 1982)

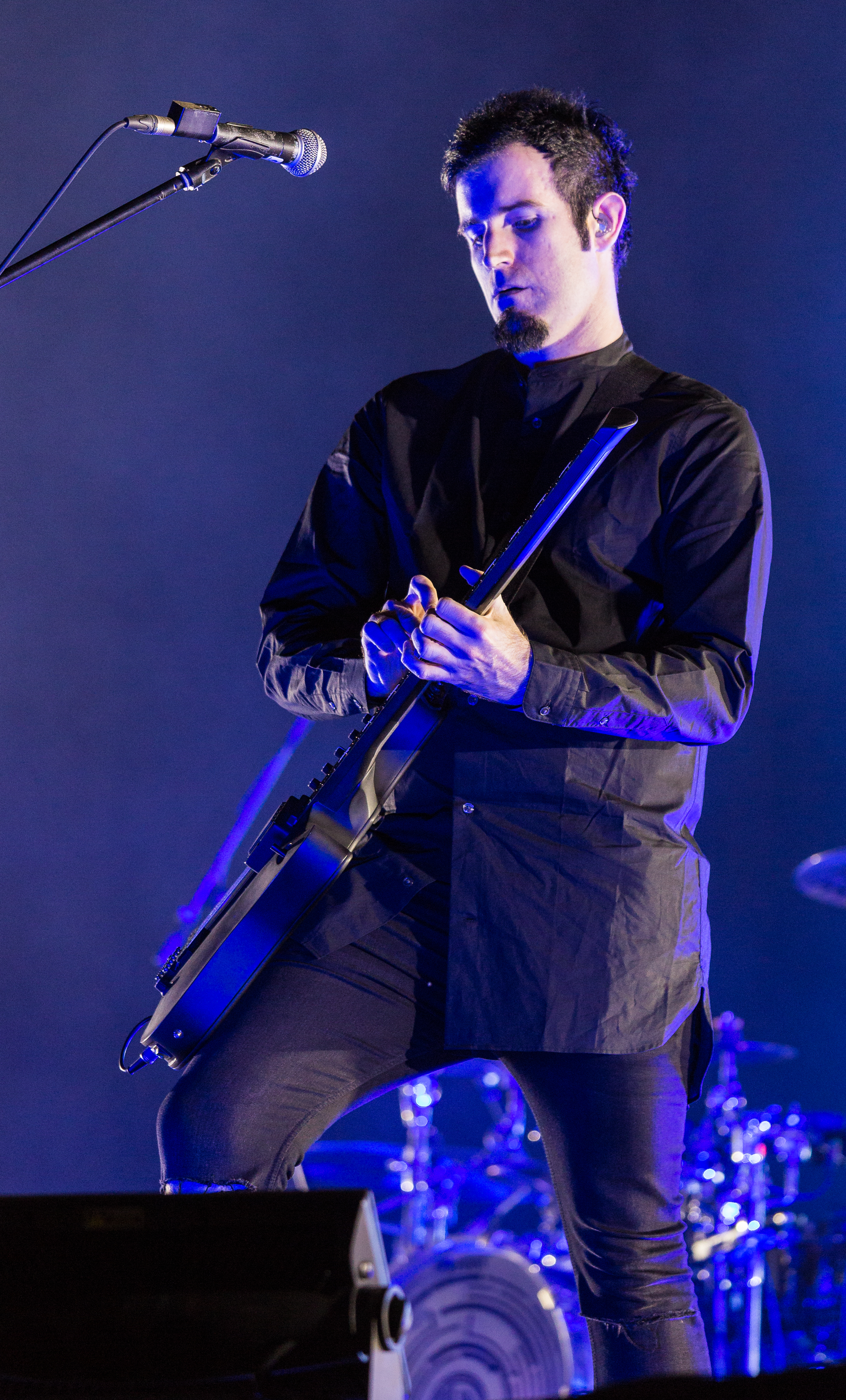
- Rob Swire in 2017

Background information
- Also known as: Anscenic
- Born: Robert Swire-Thompson; 5 November 1982 (age 43); Perth, Western Australia, Australia
- Genres: Electronic; drum and bass; electronic rock; alternative dance; dubstep; electro house; breakbeat
- Occupations: Singer; songwriter; record producer; disc jockey
- Instruments: Vocals; synthesizer; guitar; bass; keyboards; percussion; drums; piano
- Years active: 1998–present
- Labels: Mushroom Group; Warner Music; Hardline Rekordingz; Breakbeat Kaos; Earstorm
- Member of: Xygen; Pendulum; Knife Party

Robert Swire-Thompson (born 5 November 1982) is an Australian record producer, singer, songwriter, and DJ. He is the founder and lead vocalist of the drum and bass band Pendulum, as well as DJ and co-founder of electro house duo Knife Party formed of Swire and Gareth McGrillen.

Originally from Perth, Western Australia, Swire relocated to the United Kingdom in 2003 with fellow Pendulum co-founders Gareth McGrillen and Paul "El Hornet" Harding. Swire has since fulfilled a broad spectrum of roles as a member of Pendulum, ranging from songwriting to singing while performing live with an unusual guitar-like MIDI controller – Starr Labs' Ztar Z6S-XPA. Swire also plays guitar, bass, keyboards, percussion, and other instruments. He is sometimes referred to by the stage name Anscenic.

== Early life ==
Rob Swire was born and raised in Perth, Western Australia, to South African-born parents. When he was a child, his family lived in Harare in Zimbabwe for five years. During his residence, he created a song which was played on a local Zimbabwe radio station. He went to Scotch College, Swanbourne, graduating in 1999, where he first met bandmate Gareth McGrillen. Over the next three years he worked as a record producer for several local drum and bass, breakbeat and metal bands, during which time he occasionally used the stage name "Anscenic". He also made a couple of independent releases with former hardcore techno label Hardline Rekordingz, including a collaboration with the label's founder, Animal Intelligence, which was titled "Fat American Bitchcore". Only twenty lathe cut copies of the record were distributed, to help promote the label's 2001–2002 tour of New Zealand. Swire also produced a track titled "Electrodes on the Skull" which was released alongside three tracks by other artists signed to the label at that time.

== Career ==
=== Pendulum ===
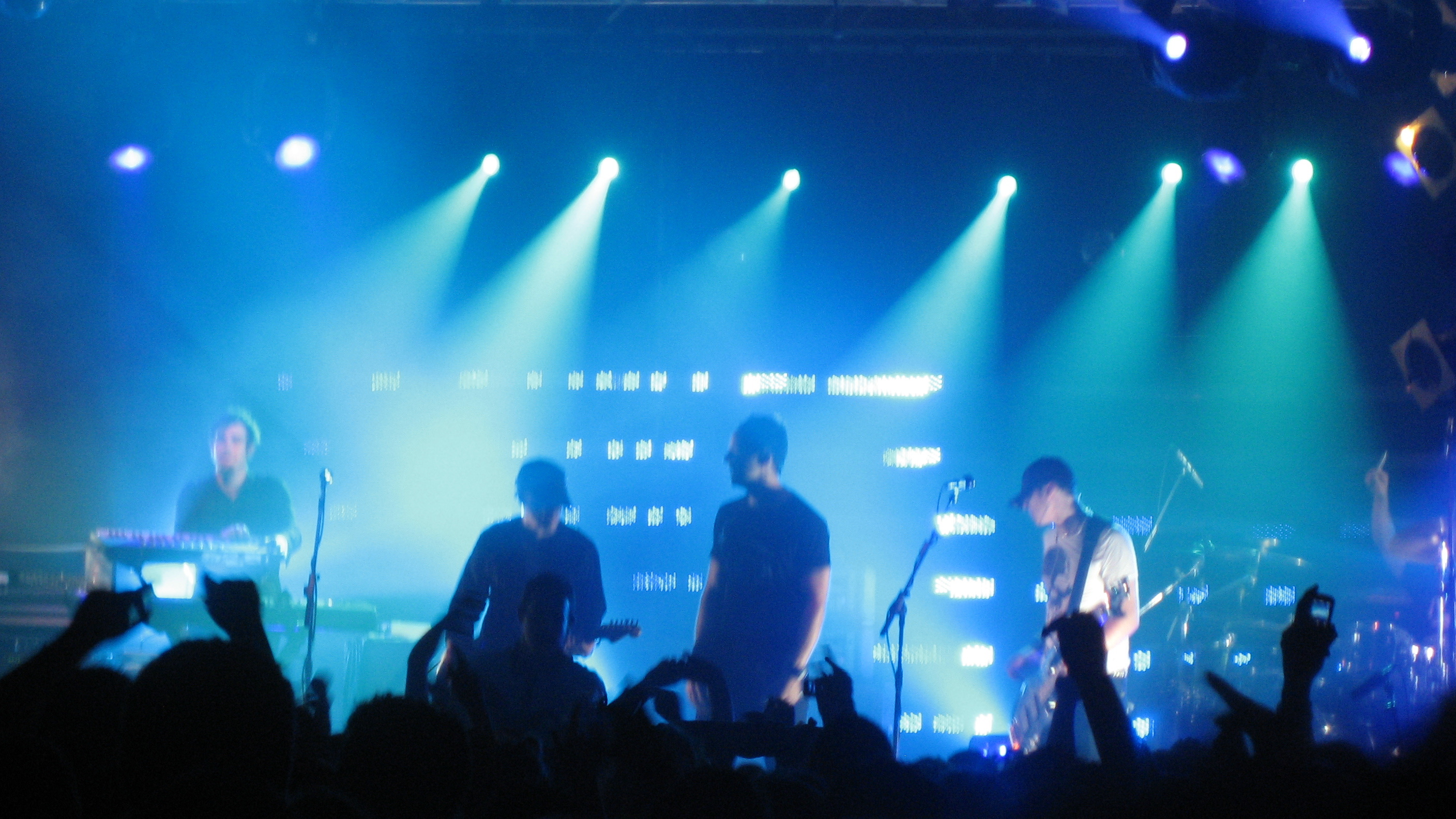
Pendulum at the Electric Ballroom in London, England, 2007

In 2002, Swire formed drum and bass act Pendulum with fellow Xygen bandmate McGrillen and local DJ Paul "El Hornet" Harding. Swire relocated to the United Kingdom the following year, along with the other members of the band, and the band soon gained widespread underground recognition for their tracks "Vault" and "Trail of Sevens". Over the next two years Swire worked on material for the band's debut album, Hold Your Colour, primarily as the band's songwriter and producer alongside McGrillen. The album was released in 2005, to considerable commercial success. When the band began performing live in October 2006, Swire became the band's lead singer in addition to playing a Ztar – a guitar-like MIDI controller – during live performances.

After the band's first tour they started work on a second album, In Silico, for which Swire featured as the main vocalist, after already appearing on tracks such as "Spiral", "Hold Your Colour", "Streamline", and "Still Grey" in order to keep a consistent sound. In addition, he continued his former roles of writer and producer, although he delegated the task of vocal mixing to a professional mixing engineer. Swire was also extensively involved in creating publicity material for the new album, as he explained during an interview with Lucy Chakaodza of The Independent.

Pendulum released their third album titled Immersion in the UK on 24 May 2010. This is Pendulum's only number one album, topping the UK Albums Chart.

Pendulum announced on 19 June 2012 that they had split. Swire stated, "We're having too much fun with the Knife Party project. It's also great because Pendulum, towards the end, sort of felt like we were doing it because we had to, and that's never a fun way to do music. Whereas Knife Party is pretty much solely us doing what we want to and if no one likes it we don't care." This can be equated to Rob Swire feeling limited to a genre under the band Pendulum, and he has stated publicly over tweets that he hates the restriction that a fan base can bring, he does enjoy continuing to produce music.

On 22 August 2013, Swire revealed that a new Pendulum album will probably be released sometime in 2014. Despite this, Swire ruled out the possibility of Pendulum performing live again. However, Pendulum reunited at the 2016 Ultra Music Festival in Miami, Florida.

On 9 January 2017, Pendulum confirmed to be reuniting for a world tour and possibly releasing a new album, with Swire also returning. They performed live at several music festivals internationally throughout 2017.

On 29 June 2018, Pendulum's album, aptly titled "The Reworks" was released, composed solely of remixes from artists such as Skrillex, Moby, Pegboard Nerds, Noisia and the Knife Party alias. Remixes from Noisia, Knife Party, Icarus and Skrillex were released as singles beforehand.

On 17 September 2020, Pendulum released two singles "Driver" and "Nothing for Free", making this the first new material in ten years since Immersion. A music video for "Nothing for Free" was produced, and the two songs were included in a live set performed by Pendulum at Spitbank Fort on 2 October 2020. Swire indicated that for foreseeable future, Pendulum would continue to gradually release tracks in small chunks similar to the September 2020 release, rather than wait to release an entire album at once. This concluded in early 2021 as the listed songs plus 2 new tracks released in their EP Elemental. A second EP, Anima, was released in 2023. Pendulum's fourth album, Inertia, was released in 2025.

=== Knife Party ===
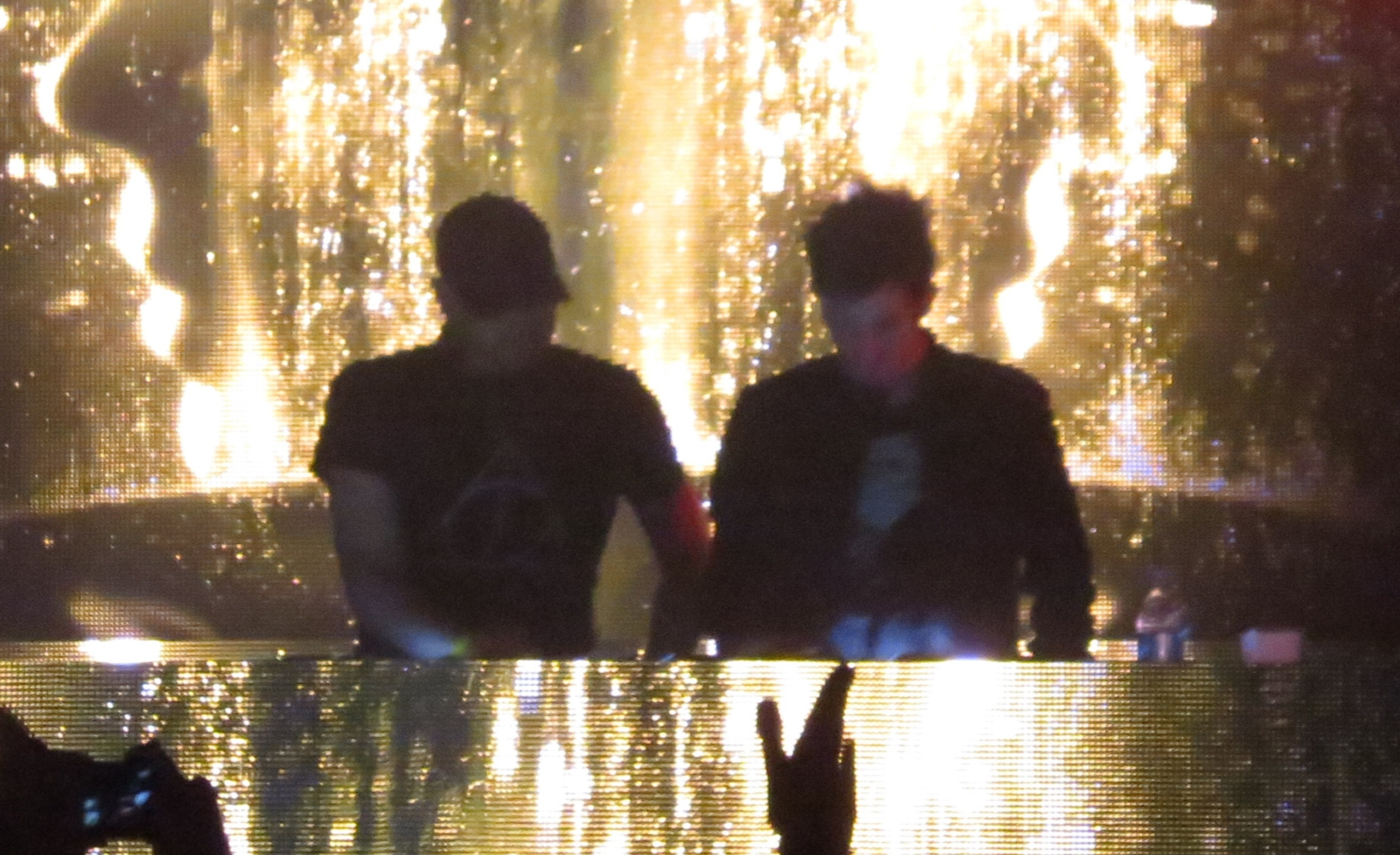
Swire with Knife Party in 2015

In 2011, Swire formed the electro house duo with Pendulum co-founder Gareth McGrillen. The duo released their debut EP, 100% No Modern Talking, on 12 December 2011. The group's popularity grew considerably when they released the top 5 hit U.K. single, Antidote, in collaboration with Swedish House Mafia. The single was released on 16 December 2011, and has now hit over 22 million views on YouTube. "Internet Friends", was released as a second single from the EP, but peaked at a lowly number 83 in the U.K Their second EP, Rage Valley, was released on 27 May 2012, and produced three singles, "Rage Valley", "Bonfire", and "Centipede". All of the singles made it onto the U.K. top 100, but none hit the top 40. However, the EP's second single, "Bonfire", peaked at number 18 on the Finnish Singles Chart. The duo's third EP, Haunted House, was released on 6 May 2013, and features four tracks: "Power Glove", "LRAD", "EDM Death Machine", and their own VIP mix of "Internet Friends", originally from 100% No Modern Talking. The duo has accumulated a large cult following for their distinctive style: With influences of electro house and dubstep on their first EP, their style has grown to include influences from a wider range of styles, such as moombahton (a combination of house and reggaeton music), and drumstep. The Knife Party remix of Swedish House Mafia's "Save the World" was Zane Lowe's 'Hottest Record in the World' on 31 May 2011.

In late 2014, Knife Party released the 12 track album, "Abandon Ship". It was released accidentally through iTunes in October, though it was officially supposed to be delayed until November. The album features diverse stylistic influences, from dubstep, to house and notably features some parody work such as "EDM Trend Machine", ostensibly mocking certain tropes of contemporary EDM.

In November 2015, Knife Party released a 4-track EP, Trigger Warning, with three original tracks ("PLUR Police", "Kraken" with Tom Staar, and "Parliament Funk"), alongside a remix of "PLUR Police" by Jauz. The originals have heavy influences from various styles of house, while the Jauz remix is more influenced by dubstep.

Knife Party's Tom Morello collaboration, "Battle Sirens", was released in September 2016, and it is part of Morello's album "The Atlas Underground". As a single, it was remixed by Brillz and Ephwurd individually.

Knife Party released their own remix of their Pendulum original "Blood Sugar" on 13 April 2018 to mixed reception.

Their collaboration with Pegboard Nerds, "Harpoon", was released as a single on record label Monstercat as part of Pegboard Nerds' Full Hearts EP on 26 July 2018.

They released Lost Souls in July 2019 and featured remixes by both Muzzy and Annix.

=== Other work ===
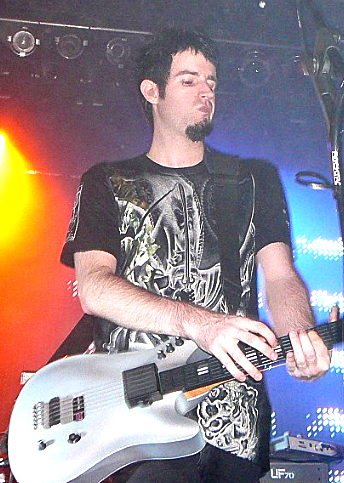
Swire performing at Center Stage in Atlanta, 2009

Swire wrote the topline melody and recorded vocals for Deadmau5's song, "Ghosts 'n' Stuff", on 25 November 2008. The song has over 60 million views on YouTube, and reached number 1 on the U.S. dance music charts, and certified 3× Platinum in Canada. Swire also co-wrote Rihanna's songs "Rude Boy" and "Roc Me Out", and contributed bass guitar and backing vocals to the songs. He has also released three other singles in collaboration with other artists: 2006's "Nervous (Creep)", as a mixer for DJ Fresh and Mary Byker; 2009's "End Credits (Live)" as a mixer for Chase & Status and Plan B; and 2010's "Play" as a producer for Taio Cruz. He recorded vocals for Eric Prydz's song "Breathe", which featured on Prydz's debut studio album Opus in 2016.

Swire additionally recorded vocals for Deadmau5's song, "Monophobia", which was released on 13 July 2018.

== Music ==
=== Production ===
Swire has worked as a record producer since 1999, most recently for Pendulum while producing the album In Silico, during which he was required to create demos, record the tracks, and mix the album. He is responsible for mixing most of the band's material, although more recently he has avoided mixing vocals, stating that, "Since I was doing the vocals, it's a bit harder to keep the objectivity on the engineer's side". To avoid spending too long worrying about sound quality, Swire drafted the demos for In Silico using Commodore 64 and Nintendo emulators, and basic synthesiser sounds. To record the album, the band travelled to various studios where the live musicians, including Swire himself, recorded acoustic drums, guitars, bass and vocals. In addition to recording the various tracks that constituted each song, Swire recorded samples of the instruments used so that, if he was not happy with one of the tracks, he could then play the part himself using a keyboard sampler. Swire has used Pro Tools for recording audio and Steinberg's Cubase for production, but now mainly uses Steinberg's Nuendo for production and post-production editing. Swire records tracks using both hardware synthesizers and virtual instruments.

=== Performance ===
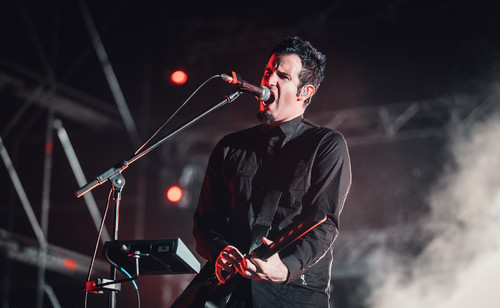
Swire at Ultra Korea in 2017

Swire has performed a wide range of instruments while recording material for Pendulum, including guitar and electric piano on Hold Your Colour, synthesiser, bass and percussion on In Silico and synthesizer and guitar on Immersion. He has also been the band's main vocalist since the release of In Silico, for the purpose of creating a consistent sounding album. When performing live with the band, Swire typically plays a guitar-like MIDI controller, Starr Labs' Ztar Z6, in addition to performing vocals on tracks for which his voice was originally used. Swire's favoured MIDI controller keyboards when performing live are the CME UF70 Master Keyboard and the Korg Kontrol 49 MIDI Keyboard.

== Discography ==
=== Singles ===
As lead artist

| Title | Year | Album |
|---|---|---|
| "Fat American Bitchcore" (with Animal Intelligence) | 2002 | Non-album single |

As featured artist

| Title | Year | Peak chart positions | | | | | | | | Certifications | Album |
| Title | Year | CAN | CAN Dig. | EU | UK | UK Dance | US Dance | US Dig. | US Heat. | Certifications | Album |
|---|---|---|---|---|---|---|---|---|---|---|---|
| "Ghosts 'n' Stuff" (Deadmau5 featuring Rob Swire) | 2009 | 53 | 56 | 41 | 12 | 2 | 1 | 6 | 24 | MC: 3× Platinum; BPI: Gold; RIAA: Platinum | For Lack of a Better Name |
| "Breathe" (Eric Prydz featuring Rob Swire) | 2016 | — | — | — | — | — | — | — | — | | Opus |
| "Sound Of You" (Armin Van Buuren featuring Rob Swire) | 2025 | | | | | | | | | | Breathe |
"—" denotes a recording that did not chart or was not released in that territory.

=== Guest appearances ===
| Title | Year | Peak chart positions | | | | Album |
| Title | Year | CAN Dig. | US Mix | US Dance | US Dig. | Album |
|---|---|---|---|---|---|---|
| "Electrodes on the Skull" | 2002 | — | — | — | — | Efil4Zanildrah Part 2 |
| "Parameter" | 2002 | — | — | — | — | Pendulum Recordings 09/02 Mix |
| "Aphid" | 2002 | — | — | — | — | Pendulum Recordings 09/02 Mix |
| "Moving Forward" | 2002 | — | — | — | — | Pendulum Recordings 09/02 Mix |
| "Monophobia" (Deadmau5 featuring Rob Swire) | 2018 | 37 | 3 | 19 | 9 | Mau5ville: Level 1 |
"—" denotes a recording that did not chart or was not released in that territory.

=== Production credits ===
| Title | Year | Performing artist(s) | Co-producer(s) | Album |
|---|---|---|---|---|
| "Nervous (Creep)" | 2006 | DJ Fresh featuring Mary Byker | Daniel Stein | Escape from Planet Monday |
| "End Credits" (Live) | 2009 | Chase & Status featuring Plan B | Saul Milton, Will Kennard | Non-album single |
| "Rude Boy" | 2009 | Rihanna | StarGate, Travis George | Rated R |
| "Play" | 2011 | Taio Cruz | Taio Cruz | TY.O |
| "Roc Me Out" | 2011 | Rihanna | StarGate, Gareth McGrillen, Kuk Harrell | Talk That Talk |
| "5 Minutes" | 2013 | Tinie Tempah | Zane Lowe | Demonstration |
