= Pendulum (drum and bass band) =

Australian drum and bass band

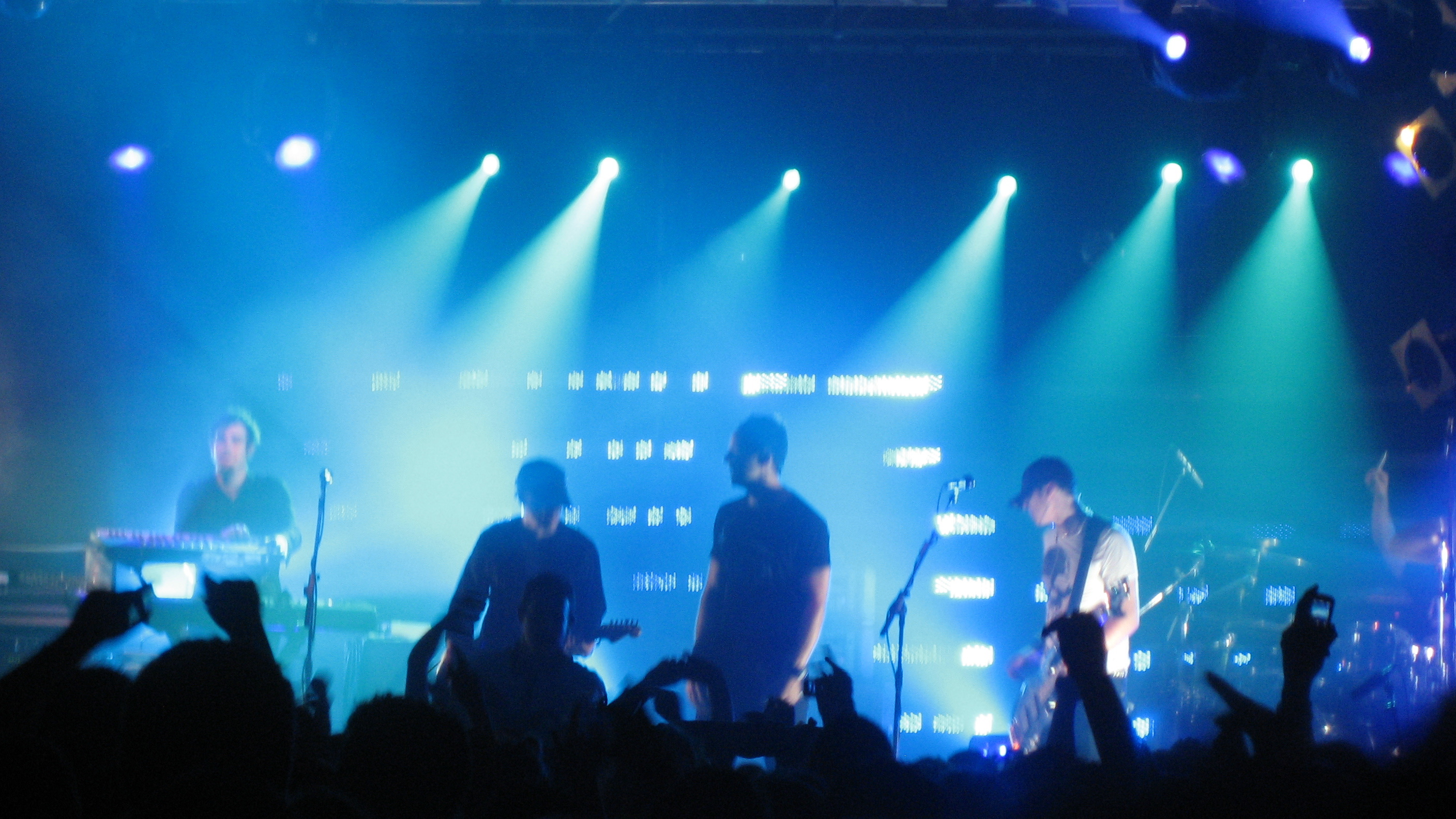
- Pendulum at the Electric Ballroom in London, England, in 2007

Background information
- Origin: Perth, Western Australia
- Genres: Drum and bass; electronic rock; industrial rock; dance-rock
- Years active: 2002–2012, 2016–present
- Labels: Breakbeat Kaos; Mushroom Group; Warner Music UK; Earstorm; Warner Bros.; Liquicity
- Spinoffs: Knife Party
- Members: Rob Swire; Gareth McGrillen; Paul "El Hornet" Harding; Peredur ap Gwynedd; KJ Sawka
- Past members: Ben Mount; Paul Kodish
- Website: pendulum.com

Pendulum is an Australian drum and bass band founded in 2002. Pendulum originally formed in the city of Perth, Western Australia, by Rob Swire, Gareth McGrillen and Paul "El Hornet" Harding. The band was later expanded to include members Ben Mount, Peredur ap Gwynedd and KJ Sawka. The group is notable for its distinctive sound, mixing electronic music with hard rock and covering a wide range of genres.

Their debut studio album, Hold Your Colour, was released in 2005 to positive critical reception. While Hold Your Colour was mostly of the drum and bass genre, the succeeding albums In Silico and Immersion saw experimentation of other genres such as industrial rock and electronic rock.

In 2012, the band went on hiatus as Swire and McGrillen concentrated on their side-project Knife Party. In 2015, the band reformed and released the remix album The Reworks in 2018. The band have since released the EPs Elemental (2021) and Anima (2023), and in 2025 released a fourth album titled Inertia.

== History ==
=== 2002–2007: Formation and Hold Your Colour ===
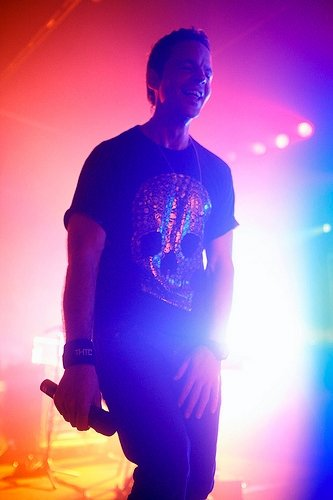
MC Ben Mount

The band began their career in Perth, Western Australia as a trio of DJs. Rob Swire and Gareth McGrillen had been in several rock and metal music bands, while Harding had been the drummer in a punk band during the mid-1990s. Harding had been active in the Perth drum and bass scene since the late 1990s, DJing under the name "El Hornet". Swire and McGrillen had performed local DJ sets and intended to start a record label. They first collaborated during The Perth Producers night at The Drumclub and decided to continue to work together under the name Pendulum.

The first track the trio produced was 'Vault', which would be released in 2003 on 31 Records. It resonated with mostly UK fans of the genre, which prompted a move to London in the same year. The band also recorded and released 'Spiral / Ulterior Motive' the same year, and in 2004 made their first compilation appearance on 'Jungle Sound: The Bassline Strikes Back!', with several songs featured and Harding in charge of mixing the album's second disc. The band was offered an album deal by Breakbeat Kaos, Fresh's label, which resulted in their debut album Hold Your Colour in 2005. The album charted in both the United Kingdom and in Australia and was certified as a golden album in Australia.

Following the success of their 2005 debut album, their label Breakbeat Kaos re-issued the compilation under the name Jungle Sound Gold, the front now saying "mixed by Pendulum". The band disapproved of this as they had neither given permission nor been informed about the release, and Pendulum later ended up leaving the label.

In 2006, the trio became a sextet after introducing Ben Mount as their MC, Peredur ap Gwynedd as their guitarist, and Paul Kodish as their drummer. At this time McGrillen began playing bass guitar at live shows and on some studio recordings.

=== 2007–2009: In Silico and Live at Brixton Academy ===
Pendulum's second album, In Silico, was released on 12 May 2008. This release contained different sounds compared to their debut album, as it contained more rock elements whilst maintaining their electronic elements. The response to this change was relatively positive from critics, but was called "a little dated" by The Guardian. The album was relatively successful as it charted at 2 on the UK Albums Chart and at 9 in the Australian Albums Chart. The album reached No. 16 on Billboard's Top Electronic Albums chart in the United States. In November 2008, three songs from the album In Silico were used in the soundtrack of Need for Speed: Undercover. The song "Tarantula" was featured in the video game MotorStorm: Pacific Rift. "Tarantula" also later inspired the release of the track "Centipede" from their spin-off band, Knife Party.

At the end of the year the band filmed a live DVD on 4 and 5 December 2008, at the Brixton Academy. This was released on 17 April 2009. Sometime afterwards, Paul Kodish left the band for unspecified reasons.

=== 2009–2011: Immersion ===
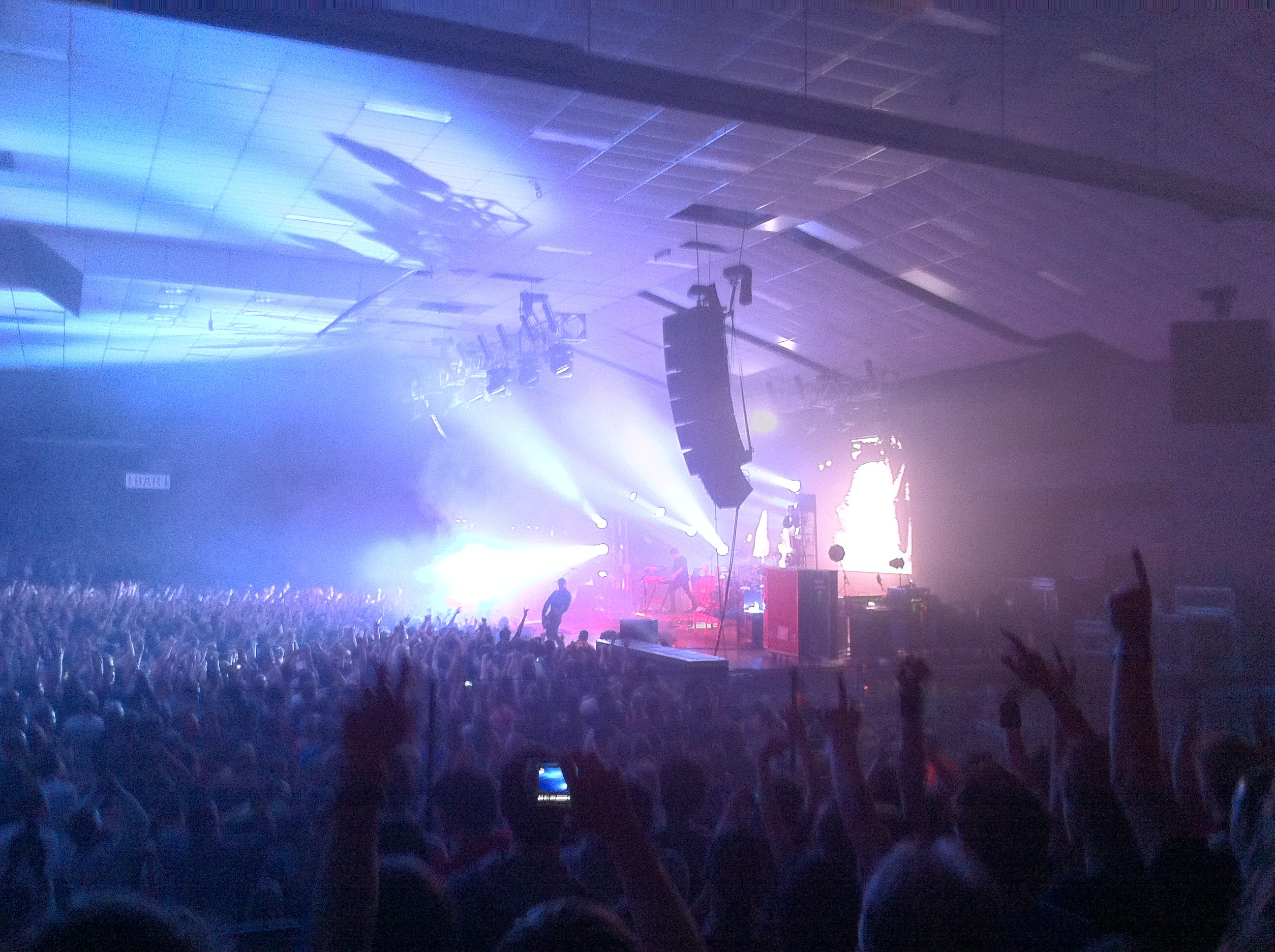
Live, Melbourne 2010.

Pendulum once again toured Europe in 2009. During this tour they announced that they were working on their third studio album, Immersion. It was announced in December 2009 that Pendulum would be touring for their new album in May 2010. The release date of the album was announced to be sometime "in May" during the live preview party at Matter, and was then announced to be released on 24 May. Pendulum previewed their album Immersion at the Ear Storm night at London's Matter nightclub on Friday 22 January. "Salt in the Wounds", a track from their new album, was Zane Lowe's Hottest Record in the World on BBC Radio 1 on 25 January 2010. On Zane Lowe's show, it was also announced that he wanted to join the band and the first single from the new album would be called "Watercolour". This single also received its first play on Zane Lowe's BBC Radio 1 show on 8 March 2010, and was his Single of the Week for that week. In December 2010, "Watercolour" was found to be featured in the soundtrack of the 2010 hit game "Need for Speed: Hot Pursuit". On 1 April, the music video for "Salt in the Wounds" was released. The video is unique in that it is, according to the band's website, "...the world’s first 360° interactive music video."

"Watercolour" claimed the No.4 spot in the UK Singles Chart, making it their biggest hit to date. On 21 May 2010, the band headlined the annual Radio 1's Big Weekend festival which was held at the Vaynol Estate, Bangor, Gwynedd. The second single from the album, "Witchcraft", was released on 18 July and charted at No.29 in the UK Singles chart, making it their third highest charted single in the UK. The third single from Immersion was "The Island", and just missed the UK Top 40 at No. 41.

Rob Swire had stated that if it had achieved greater success than "Witchcraft", he would have released a song entitled "Ransom", which was taken off Immersion before the album's release. Swire revealed the original files for "Ransom" were corrupted, and that he had no plans to recreate them, therefore it would not be released. However, on 6 April 2011, Pendulum released "Ransom" as a single via their website with all proceeds going to the Help for Japan fund after the tsunami. "Crush" was released as the fourth single in January 2011. In January 2011, Pendulum released a Deluxe Edition of Immersion via iTunes which contained the album's original 15 tracks and a collection of remixes of "Watercolour", "Witchcraft" and "The Island" by other artists including deadmau5, Tiësto and Chuckie. Both the UK and US store were also given the music videos of those three tracks in the release.

=== 2011–2015: Knife Party and hiatus ===
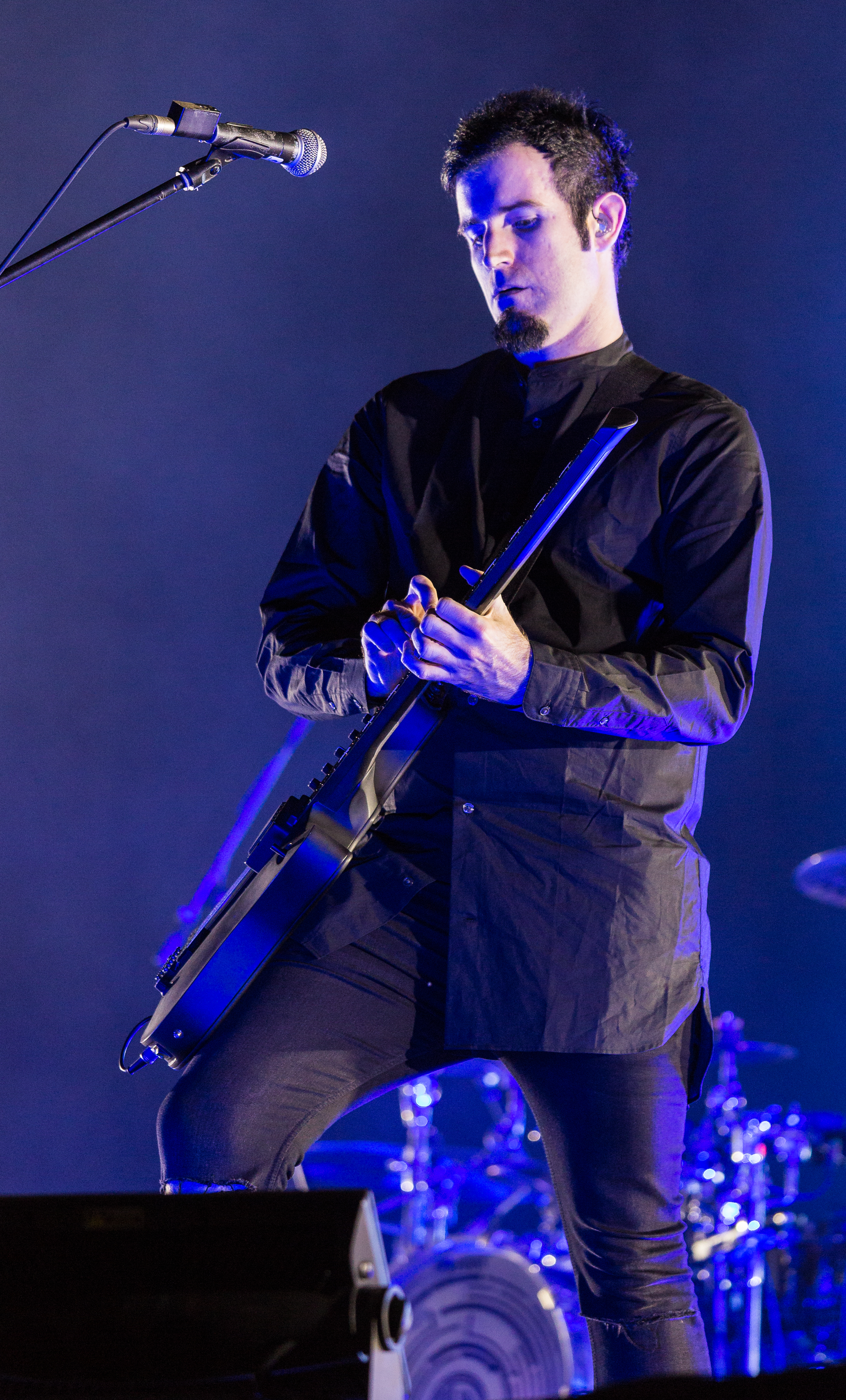
Vocalist and Guitarist Rob Swire performing with Pendulum at the Nova Rock Festival in 2017

On 26 October 2010, Swire announced that a new record was in the works. This new record was set to be heavily punk influenced. The next album was expected to be a significant departure from usage of drum and bass tempo, for a faster tempo in the form of punk, and a slower tempo in the form of dubstep.

On 29 March 2011, Swire revealed that there would be no "new album" for a while. However, he did add that there would be "def new material" later in the year.

Pendulum opened for Linkin Park on several selected dates during the band's 2011 "A Thousand Suns" North American tour. They also headlined their own tour supported by Innerpartysystem who are also an Electronic Rock band.

Pendulum played at the 2011 Download Festival, Oxegen, The Eden Sessions, Glastonbury Festival, T in the Park, and V Festival, headlined Global Gathering, an exclusive London show at South West Four and finally headlined the first night of Bestival on the Isle of Wight.

Pendulum headlined at Rhythm & Vines 2011 in Gisborne, New Zealand. They also were one of the headliners on the Main Stage line-up at the LovEvolution 2011 Dance Festival and Parade in Oakland, California, which had over 50 DJs and 15 or more parade floats.

On 3 January 2012, Pendulum announced that they would be taking a hiatus from touring while thanking their fans for the last several years. They went on to state that they might create a new record in 2013. Six months later on 16 June 2012, Rob Swire reiterated that there would be no further Pendulum live shows and also withdrew his plans of releasing a new record in 2013, as Knife Party had become his primary project. El Hornet and MC Verse, meanwhile, continued to perform DJ sets across the world using the alias, while the remaining members of the band began to partake in various side projects.

In 2011 Rob Swire and fellow member Gareth McGrillen announced in various interviews that a project called Knife Party had been created. The side project is virtually unlinked by any means to Pendulum and consists of electro house, dubstep and other club genres. Knife Party has since become the duo's primary project.

The following year on 22 August 2013, in a series of tweets, it was revealed that along with a Knife Party album, a possible Pendulum album may also be released in 2014. El-Hornet later confirmed the album in a speech at the 9:30 Club in Washington, D.C., and said "don't rush us".

On 13 July 2014, Swire stated that work on the new Pendulum album will begin around September and could be released early 2015. Yet on 16 December 2014, Knife Party did an AMA on Reddit which some fans inquired the duo about how the Pendulum album was coming along. Rob Swire stated that, although they weren't working on it yet, they had some old material from previous albums that can be re-worked and finished into something new, which is however, different from all previous work Pendulum have done so far. Rob Swire also stated that he personally didn't want to make a new Pendulum album but rather work on something else with Knife Party or create a new project altogether, one he can have "control" of, since he "lost heart for the project", having no real desire to make drum and bass anymore and fusing it with rock, while again ruling out a live band tour and gave no further details on release dates.

=== 2015–2019: Hold Your Colour anniversary and reunion ===
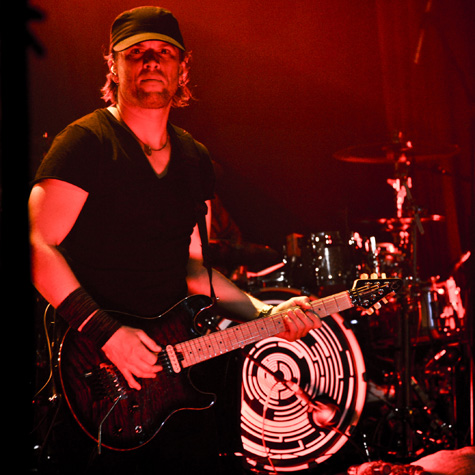
Guitarist Peredur ap Gwynedd

On 20 July 2015, the 10-year anniversary of the release of Hold Your Colour, Rob Swire took to the Pendulum Twitter page to celebrate, thanking the fans for their support and changing the profile picture to that of a birthday cake underneath the Pendulum logo in its original font. On 26 July 2015, Rob also uploaded two videos to his personal Twitter page of old Pendulum studio files playing on his computer.

On 22 August 2015, Rob Swire and Gareth McGrillen joined El Hornet and Ben Verse onstage at V Festival in Hylands Park, Essex for the Pendulum DJ set. This marks the first time either of the members have performed under the Pendulum name in four years. Rob later tweeted after the performance that the experience was "fun, and also weird."

On 16 December 2015, it was announced that Pendulum would reunite as a live band at the 2016 Ultra Music Festival in Miami, Florida. The band closed the music festival as the latter half of a joined performance with Knife Party. This was the first live performance of the band without MC Ben Verse. The band performed new live versions of songs such as Knife Party's "Begin Again" as well as deadmau5's Moar Ghosts 'n' Stuff, with deadmau5 himself performing live alongside the band.

On 16 December 2016, Pendulum was confirmed to be performing as a live act at Nova Rock festival 2017. The band also posted an image to their Facebook page teasing a possible return in 2017.

Pendulum also performed in their hometown Perth to ring in the new year at the 10 year anniversary of the Origin NYE festival.

On 9 January 2017, it was unveiled via their YouTube channel that Pendulum would be officially returning. On 13 January, Pendulum officially announced on their website that a possible London tour/album release may be happening in Summer 2017. In March 2017, the band further announced performances at Ultra Singapore, Nova Rock festival in Austria and VOLT Festival in Hungary, as well as Ultra Korea in June 2017. The band also performed a headline set at Nass Festival 2017. In August 2017, the band also performed at South West Four Festival in Clapham Common, London.

On 10 August 2017, Rob Swire announced that he would be making a new Pendulum album. The band also departed from their label Warner Music UK opting for their own label, Earstorm in order for more creative control.

On 2 September Pendulum headlined the first day of the Weekender festival in Jersey, Channel Islands. They ended their summer tour at the Ultra Japan on 18 September 2017, and additionally played the Snowbombing festival in 2018.

On 26 February 2018, Pendulum announced a remix album, The Reworks, to be released in installments beginning on 16 March and ending in June. The band has also announced it will release The Complete Works box set. The group also announced forthcoming show dates, kicking off its first headline show since 2011 in London's Printworks on 14 April. Swire has also confirmed that after "The Reworks" there will be new music coming. He didn't specify whether it would be Pendulum, Knife Party, or both: however, Swire was hinting towards a new original Pendulum album, as he has been teasing one since the release of Knife Party's 2014 debut album Abandon Ship.

On 29 January 2019, Rob Swire and Gareth McGrillen stated that they had "potential new Pendulum stuff" that they would be working on following the release of their Knife Party EP Lost Souls. They indicated that recording with the remaining Pendulum members would begin soon, saying that they had "loads of stuff" already. They also discussed their previous intentions to release new Pendulum songs in 2018, and explained that they were reluctant to introduce new material live.

In March 2019, Pendulum announced their headline appearance at the upcoming Southwest Four Festival, which had Swire, McGrillen, and El Hornet play a DJ set in front of a Mayan temple like structure. The performance will be the first of their "Trinity" tour with dates to be announced in North America, Europe and Australasia in 2019/2020.

=== 2020–2023: Elemental, Anima, and remixes ===
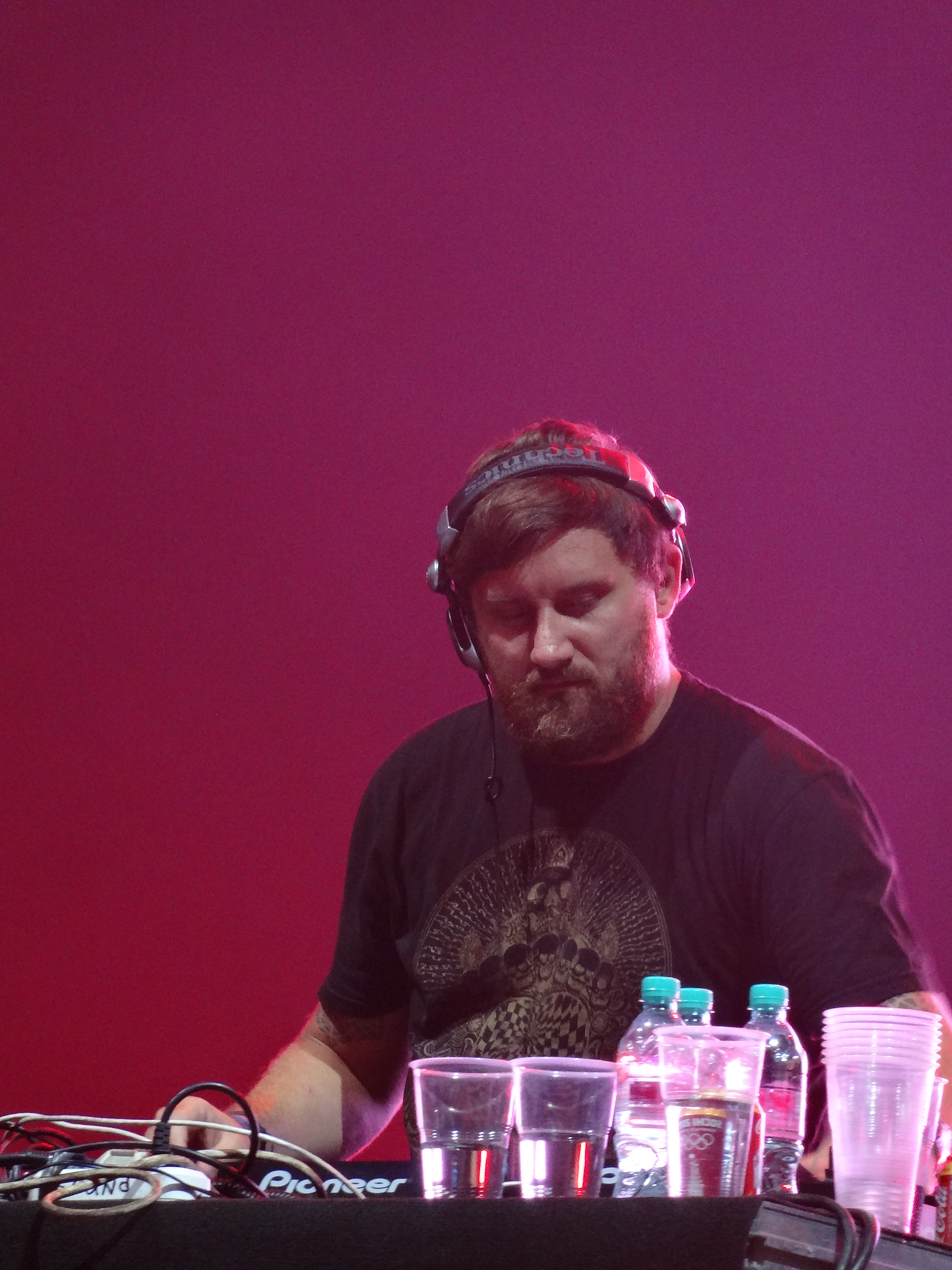
DJ Paul Harding at Park Live Festival in Moscow in 2013

On 16 September 2020, Pendulum announced two new songs released on 17 September, "Driver" and "Nothing for Free", marking their first new music in 10 years. An accompanying music video for "Nothing for Free" was released 18 September, which features a population of rabbits dealing with an outbreak of myxomatosis, which serves as a commentary on the worldwide COVID-19 pandemic. On 14 September 2020, the band recorded a concert at Spitbank Fort to promote their new music which was streamed live on YouTube on 2 October 2020.

On 16 April 2021, Pendulum released "Come Alive" accompanied by a video featuring footage from their London SW4 Trinity show in 2019, and announced a live headline festival appearance at Drumsheds on 13 August 2021 with the promise of more new material and dates to follow, possibly signalling the re-launch of the comeback tour, which was postponed due to the COVID-19 pandemic.

On 20 May 2021, the new EP Elemental was announced for release on 17 June 2021, also containing a song featuring Hybrid Minds titled "Louder Than Words".

The day after the release of the EP, a live action-animated hybrid music video for "Louder Than Words" was released, featuring Bob and Gary, a cartoon cat and mouse duo heavily inspired by Tom and Jerry, going through a depressing break-up where Gary becomes famous as a result of the show while Bob fell into obscurity. As a result, Bob watches his former partner's life spiral out of control as a result of bad decisions, culminating in Gary being hospitalised from a drunk driving crash, prompting Bob to reunite with Gary. The end title screen caption, "That's it, chaps!", is also a reference to Looney Tunes. The video was directed by Ed Bulmer.

A remix EP of Elemental was later released on 19 November 2021.

On June 2, 2023, Pendulum released a new song titled "Halo", which features Welsh metalcore singer and Bullet for My Valentine frontman Matthew Tuck on unclean vocals. This was later revealed as the first single from their second EP, Anima, to be released on November 3. Further singles included "Colourfast", released September 8, and "Mercy Killing" with Scarlxrd, released November 1.

In June 2023, Pendulum released a documentary titled 'Pendulum: The New Era' which looks at the reasons behind their hiatus from 2012 till their eventual reunion show in 2016.

In October 2023, Pendulum performed a cover of "Anti-Hero" by Taylor Swift on the Australian radio station Triple J as part of Like a Version.

=== 2024–present: Inertia ===
In March 2024, Pendulum made their return to touring as a live band with a limited run of dates across cities in the UK and European festivals. At these shows they debuted a new track "Napalm", which featured Joey Valence & Brae. "Napalm" was later released as a single in August 2024, coinciding with the band playing at Reading & Leeds festival.

In May 2025, the band announced their fourth studio album, and first in 15 years, Inertia. The album featured all eight tracks from the Elemental and Anima EPs, as well as "Napalm" and seven new tracks (a handful of which were debuted at live shows in 2023 and 2024). The album was released on 22 August 2025.

On 9 August 2025, Pendulum headlined their biggest-ever live show at the Milton Keynes National Bowl. A one off date outdoor show in the UK at the National Bowl in Milton Keynes with a 65,000 capacity. This was Pendulum’s first time headlining the National Bowl, having previously supported acts at the venue in 2008 and 2010.

== Artistry ==
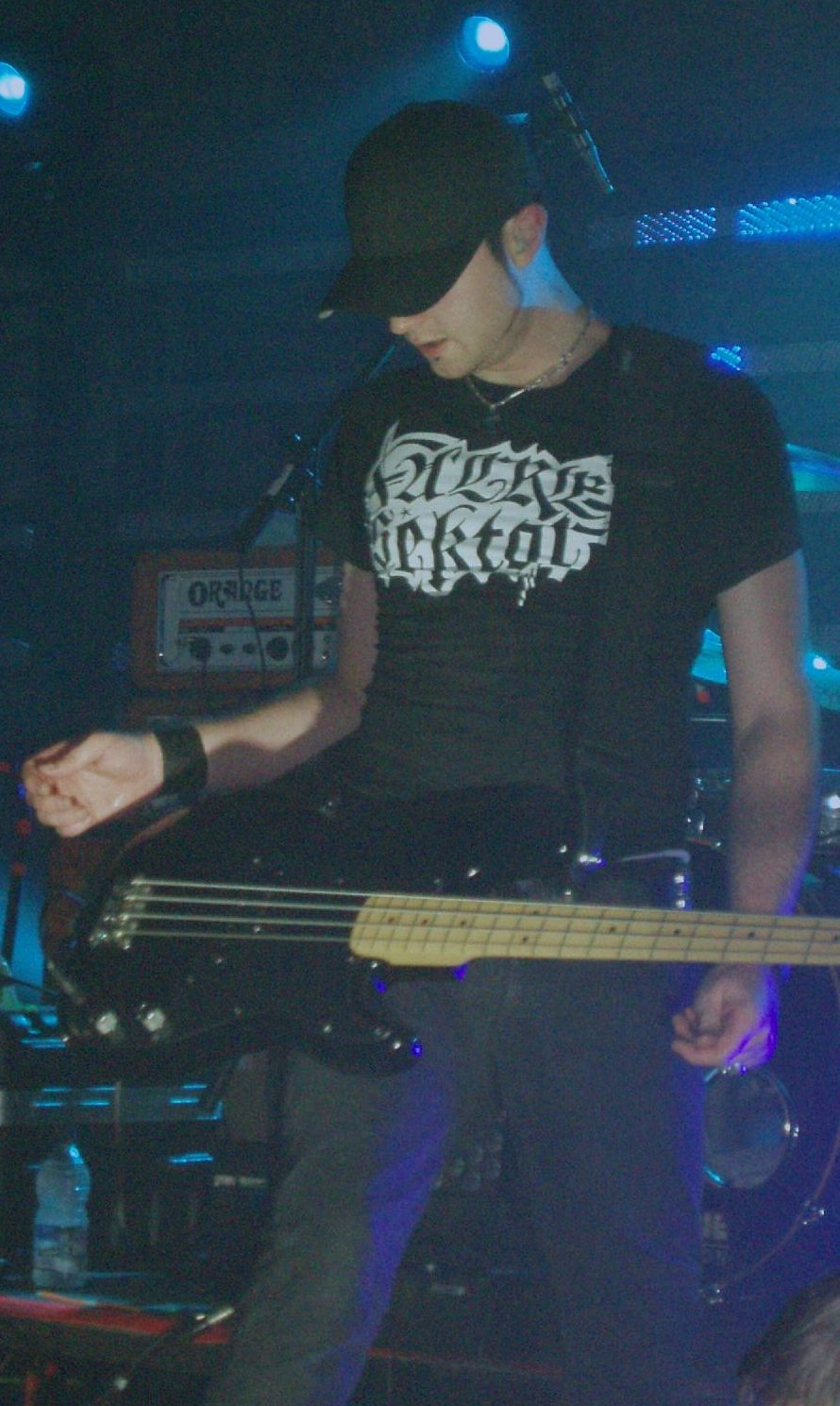
Bassist Gareth McGrillen at University of Hertfordshire in 2007

When Pendulum was formed, their musical style was considerably more drum and bass–sounding than the work they were known for later in their career. Signature tunes such as "Masochist", "Vault", "Back 2 You" and "Voyager", which were released on labels such as Uprising Records, 31 Records, Renegade Hardware and Low Profile Records, have a darker, more amelodic air to them which is substantially absent from their later productions. The band's newer work is regarded as generally leaning heavily towards a mainstream, dance-driven sound. Early work such as "Another Planet" seems to indicate an early affinity with a more global sound, similar to other Breakbeat Kaos artists such as DJ Fresh and Adam F.

The group has produced various remixes of other artists also; one of the best-known being the remix of "Voodoo People", originally by British band The Prodigy. In 2008–2010, they covered/remixed songs including Led Zeppelin's "Immigrant Song", Linkin Park's "The Catalyst", Calvin Harris's "I'm Not Alone", Coldplay's "Violet Hill", and Metallica's "Master of Puppets". Pendulum's versions of "I'm Not Alone" and "Master of Puppets" both exist as studio recordings but have not been officially released and have only previewed during DJ sets. The original live version of "Master of Puppets" was played as an instrumental introduction for "Slam" and was featured on their first live album/DVD. During their American tour as the supporting band for Linkin Park, the song was played in its entirety, with Rob doing vocals. Pendulum have also remixed their own music and, on occasion, television theme songs, such as Australian television's "ABC News Theme" in May 2010. The remix proved to be immensely popular with listeners of Australian youth radio station Triple J, polling at number 11 in the 2010 Triple J Hottest 100 countdown.

Pendulum's musical style consisted of a fusion of drum and bass (along with other electronic genres), alternative rock and heavy metal, with the inclusion of acoustic instruments. This creates a sound reminiscent of electronic rock, albeit with much more prominent drum and bass and, more recently, dubstep influences. Some songs, such as "Slam", "Propane Nightmares" and "Witchcraft" are synth-led, whilst others, such as "Showdown", "The Tempest" and "Comprachicos", are guitar-led. Bassist Gareth McGrillen stated in an interview on Channel 4 that they use 13 computers during the live performances, all of which are mixing the sounds produced by the instruments in real time. Rob Swire stated in issues of TJECK magazine and Rock Sound magazine that he would like to begin producing songs with a punk style to them, which Gareth clarified to mean "A raw, aggressive, less polished method of producing". Pendulum were known to be fans of progressive rock and progressive metal bands, which may have inspired them to fuse multiple genres of music together, which is standard practice in those genres.

== Members ==
=== Current members ===
- Rob Swire – lead vocals, synthesizer, guitar, keyboards, bass guitar, production, DJ (2002–present)
- Gareth McGrillen – bass guitar, backing vocals, production, DJ (2002–present); MC (2016–present)
- Paul Harding – DJ (2002–present)
- Peredur ap Gwynedd – guitar (2006–present)
- KJ Sawka – drums, percussion (2009–present)

=== Former members ===
- Paul Kodish – drums (2006–2009)
- Ben Mount – MC (2006–2018)

=== Touring musicians ===
(These members performed during Pendulum's transition into a live band prior to the acquisition of guitarist Peredur ap Gwynedd and MC Ben Mount as permanent members.)

- Matt White – guitar (2006–2008)
- MC Jakes – MC (2006–2008)

== Discography ==
=== Studio albums ===
- Hold Your Colour (2005)
- In Silico (2008)
- Immersion (2010)
- Inertia (2025)

== Awards ==
=== AIR Awards ===
The Australian Independent Record Awards (commonly known informally as AIR Awards) is an annual awards night to recognise, promote and celebrate the success of Australia's Independent Music sector.

Year	Nominee / work	Award	Result
2006	Hold Your Colour	Best Performing Independent Album	Nominated
2006	Pendulum	Independent Artist of the Year	Nominated

=== West Australian Music Industry Awards ===
The West Australian Music Industry Awards (WAMIs) are annual awards presented to the local contemporary music industry, put on annually by the Western Australian Music Industry Association Inc (WAM).

Year	Nominee / work	Award	Result (wins only)
2006	Pendulum	Best Electronic Producer	Won
2007	Pendulum	Best Electronic Producer	Won
2007	Pendulum	Best Live Electronic Act	Won
2008	Pendulum	Best Electronic Producer	Won
2008	Pendulum	Best Live Electronic Act	Won
2009	Pendulum	Best Live Electronic Act	Won
