= Pendulum discography =

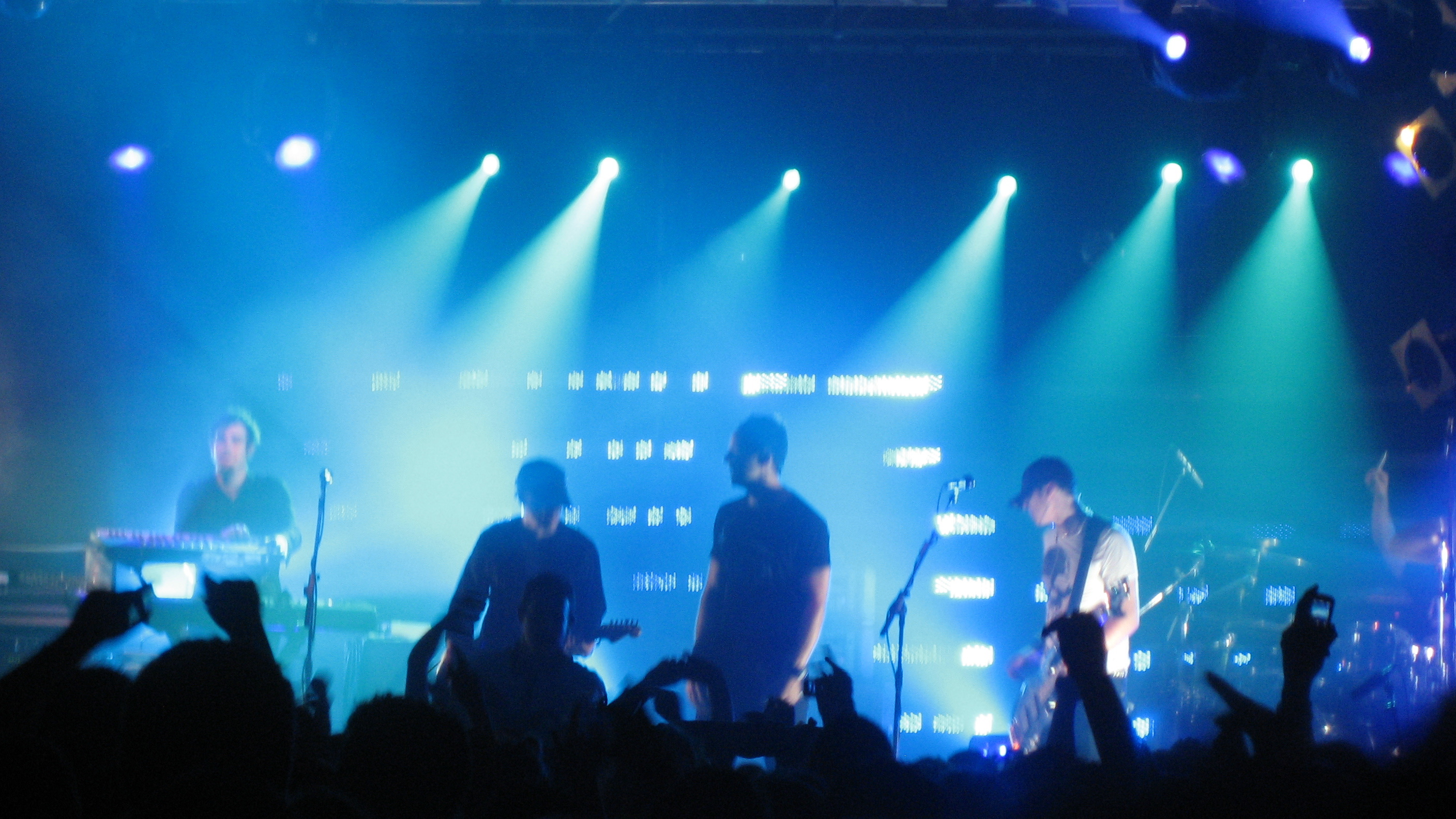
- Pendulum live at the Electric Ballroom in London during their 2007 tour
- Studio albums: 4
- Extended plays: 2
- Live albums: 1
- Compilation albums: 1
- Singles: 27
- Music videos: 18
- Other appearances: 36

Pendulum are an Australian drum and bass band originating from Perth, Western Australia. They have released four studio albums, one live album, one compilation, one extended play, twenty-five singles and twelve music videos.

Pendulum were formed in 2002 by Rob Swire, Gareth McGrillen and Paul "El Hornet" Harding in Perth. Their first individual single release was the double A-side "Spiral" / "Ulterior Motive" in July 2003. The single was only released in New Zealand and did not receive much publicity, but later that year their track "Vault" was met with widespread underground recognition. Soon after, the band relocated to the United Kingdom where they were joined by guitarist Peredur ap Gwynedd, drummer Paul Kodish, and MC Ben "the Verse" Mount.

Their first full-length release followed in July 2005 with the album Hold Your Colour. Five singles were produced from the album, including "Slam" / "Out Here", the first single by Pendulum to reach the top forty in the UK Singles Chart. In addition, two non-album singles were released. The first was Pendulum's remix of "Voodoo People" originally by The Prodigy, released on 3 October 2005. It reached number twenty in the UK charts and was the band's most successful single for almost three years. This was followed by "Blood Sugar" / "Axle Grinder", released on 18 June 2007, which was later appended to the reissue of Hold Your Colour due to its popularity.

Pendulum's second album, In Silico, was released in May 2008 to significant commercial success. The album charted at number two in the United Kingdom and at number nine in Australia, and has been certified Platinum in the UK. Four singles have been released from In Silico. The most successful of these is "Propane Nightmares", which reached number nine in the UK Singles Chart and was nominated for Best Single at the Kerrang! Awards 2008 ceremony.

The band's third album titled Immersion was released on 24 May 2010. It peaked at number one in the United Kingdom during its first week of release, marking the band's success. The lead single from the album "Watercolour" reached number four on the UK Singles Chart, making it Pendulum's highest-charting single to date. So far, Immersion has been their most successful album based on sales and chart success.

Their fourth album Inertia was released on 22 August 2025. I peaked at number 8 on the UK charts. Ten singles were released from Inertia including Driver (originally released on their 2021 EP Elemental), Save the Cat and Halo.

== Albums ==
=== Studio albums ===
Title	Details	Peak chart positions										Certifications (sales thresholds)
Title	Details	AUS	AUT	BEL	FIN	IRL	NLD	NZ	SWI	UK	US Heat.	Certifications (sales thresholds)
Hold Your Colour	Released: 25 July 2005; Label: Breakbeat Kaos (BBK002); Formats: LP, CD, download	77	—	—	—	—	—	—	—	29	—	ARIA: Gold; BPI: Platinum
In Silico	Released: 12 May 2008; Labels: Warner Music, Ear Storm, Atlantic (US); Formats: LP, CD, download	9	—	—	—	—	—	21	—	2	50	BPI: Platinum
Immersion	Released: 24 May 2010; Labels: Warner Music, Ear Storm, Atlantic (US); Formats: LP, CD, download	3	20	67	50	15	48	3	43	1	4	ARIA: Gold; BPI: Platinum
Inertia	Released: 22 August 2025; Label: Mushroom Music; Formats: LP, CD, download	59	63	61	36	—	60	—	100	8	*	
"—" denotes releases that did not chart in that country. "*" denotes a chart did not exist at that time.

=== Live albums ===
Title	Details	Peak chart positions		Notes
Title	Details	NZ	UK	Notes
Live at Brixton Academy	Released: 12 June 2009; Label: Warner Music, Ear Storm; Formats: CD, DVD, download	32	45	Recorded at Brixton Academy in December 2008. Produced by Mike Downs and directed by Paul Caslin.

=== Compilation albums ===
Title	Details	Comments
Jungle Sound: The Bassline Strikes Back!	Released: 4 October 2004; Reissued: 27 February 2006 as Jungle Sound: Gold.; Label: Breakbeat Kaos (BBK001); Formats: LP, CD, download	Various artist drum and bass compilation album released by Breakbeat Kaos, containing one unmixed disc and another disc mixed by Pendulum.

=== Remix albums ===
Title	Details	Peak chart positions	
Title	Details	AUS	UK
The Reworks	Released: 29 June 2018; Label: Earstorm; Formats: LP, CD, download	29	61

== Extended plays ==
Title	Details
Elemental	Released: 17 June 2021; Label: Earstorm; Formats: LP, digital download, streaming
Anima	Released: 3 November 2023; Label: Earstorm; Formats: digital download, streaming

== Singles ==
=== As lead artist ===
Year	Title	Peak chart positions					Certifications	Album
Year	Title	AUS	CAN	NZ	UK	US Alt.	Certifications	Album
2003	"Spiral" / "Ulterior Motive"	—	—	—	—	—		Non-album single
2004	"Another Planet" / "Voyager"	—	—	—	46	—		Hold Your Colour
2004	"Back 2 You" / "Still Grey"	—	—	—	—	—		Hold Your Colour
2005	"Tarantula" / "Fasten Your Seatbelt"	—	—	—	60	—	BPI: Gold; RMNZ: Platinum	Hold Your Colour
2005	"Slam" / "Out Here"	—	—	—	34	—	BPI: Silver	Hold Your Colour
2006	"Hold Your Colour" / "Streamline"	—	—	—	83	—		Hold Your Colour
2007	"Blood Sugar" / "Axle Grinder"	—	—	—	62	—	BPI: Silver	Hold Your Colour
2007	"Granite"	—	—	—	29	—		In Silico
2008	"Propane Nightmares"	—	—	—	9	38	BPI: Platinum; RMNZ: Gold	In Silico
2008	"The Other Side"	—	—	—	54	—		In Silico
2009	"Showdown"	—	—	—	119	—		In Silico
2010	"Watercolour"	37	62	37	4	—	BPI: Gold; RMNZ: Platinum	Immersion
2010	"Witchcraft"	56	—	—	29	—	BPI: Gold; RMNZ: Platinum	Immersion
2010	"The Island"	—	—	—	41	—	RMNZ: Gold	Immersion
2011	"Crush"	—	—	—	92	—		Immersion
2011	"Ransom"	—	—	—	193	—		Non-album single
2020	"Nothing for Free" / "Driver"	—	—	—	—	—		Inertia
2021	"Come Alive"	—	—	— (Note: "Come Alive" did not enter the NZ Top 40 Singles Chart, but peaked at number 23 on the NZ Hot Singles Chart.)	—	—		Inertia
2021	"Louder than Words" (with Hybrid Minds)	—	—	— (Note: "Louder than Words" did not enter the NZ Top 40 Singles Chart, but peaked at number 21 on the NZ Hot Singles Chart.)	—	—		Inertia
2023	"Halo" (featuring Matthew Tuck)	—	—	— (Note: "Halo" did not enter the NZ Top 40 Singles Chart, but peaked at number 39 on the NZ Hot Singles Chart.)	—	—		Inertia
2023	"Colourfast"	—	—	— (Note: "Colourfast" did not enter the NZ Top 40 Singles Chart, but peaked at number 31 on the NZ Hot Singles Chart.)	—	—		Inertia
2023	"Mercy Killing" (featuring Scarlxrd)	—	—	—	—	—		Inertia
2024	"Napalm" (featuring Joey Valence & Brae)	—	—	—	—	—		Inertia
2025	"Sound of You" (with Armin van Buuren and Rob Swire)	—	—	— (Note: "Sound of You" did not enter the NZ Top 40 Singles Chart, but peaked at number 31 on the NZ Hot Singles Chart.)	—	—		Breathe
2025	"Save the Cat"	—	—	—	—	—		Inertia
2025	"Cannibal" (with Wargasm)	—	—	—	—	—		Inertia
2025	"Guiding Lights" (with Awolnation)	—	—	—	—	—		Inertia
2026	"Fade" (with Alesso)	—	—	— (Note: "Fade" did not enter the NZ Top 40 Singles Chart, but peaked at number 27 on the NZ Hot Singles Chart.)	—	—		TBA
"—" denotes releases that did not chart or were not released in that country.

=== As featured artist ===
Year	Song	Artist	Peak positions	Album
Year	Song	Artist	UK	Album
2005	"Guns at Dawn"	Baron	71	Non-album single
2006	"Painkiller"	Freestylers	—	Adventures in Freestyle
2007	"Security"	Freestylers	—	Adventures in Freestyle
"—" denotes releases that did not chart or were not released in that country.

=== Promotional singles ===
Year	Title	Single details	Album
2006	Hardware Limited 03	A. "Minds Eye" (Pendulum & Bulletproof)^{[I]} AA. "Trail of Sevens"^{[II]}	Non-album single
2008	"The Tempest"	3" mini CD given away free for promotional use only.	In Silico
2010	"Immunize"	3" mini CD given away free at Milton Keynes Bowl only.	Immersion

- I Released first on Skool of Hard Knocks.
- II Released first on Paranoia EP – Part 1.

== Remixes ==
Year	Song	Artist	Peak positions					Album
Year	Song	Artist	AUS	IRL	NOR	SWE	UK	Album
2005	"Voodoo People"	The Prodigy	79	27	20	93	20	Their Law: The Singles 1990–2005
2010	"ABC News Theme"^{[III]}	Tony Ansell & Peter Wall	38	—	—	—	—	Non-album single
2025	"Sound of You"^{[IV]}	Armin van Buuren & Rob Swire	—	—	—	—	—	Breathe
"—" denotes releases that did not chart or were not released in that country.

- III Released only on Australian iTunes Store.
- IV Released as a single billed as Pendulum, Armin Van Buuren & Rob Swire

== Music videos ==
Year	Song	Album	Director	Type	Link
2005	"Slam"	Hold Your Colour	Adam Brown	Narrative	
2005	"Voodoo People" (Pendulum remix)	Their Law: The Singles 1990–2005	Ron Scalpello	Narrative	
2007	"Granite"	In Silico	D.A.R.Y.L.	Compilation	
2008	"Propane Nightmares"	In Silico	Tim Qualtrough	Narrative	
2008	"The Other Side"	In Silico	Rob Chandler	Narrative	
2008	"Showdown"	In Silico	Nick Bartleet	Narrative	
2010	"Salt in the Wounds"	Immersion	A former Russian army general	Visual	
2010	"Watercolour"	Immersion	The Found Collective	Performance	
2010	"Witchcraft"	Immersion	The Found Collective	Performance	
2010	"The Island, Pt. I (Dawn)"	Immersion	The Found Collective	Narrative	
2011	"Crush"	Immersion	Tim Qualtrough	Narrative	
2020	"Nothing For Free"	Inertia	Lewis Cater	Performance/Narrative	
2021	"Come Alive"	Inertia		Performance	
2021	"Louder Than Words"	Inertia	Ed Bulmer	Animation	
2023	"Halo" (featuring Matthew Tuck)	Inertia		Performance	
2023	"Colourfast"	Inertia	Ross Silcocks	Performance	
2025	"Save The Cat"	Inertia	Jason Baker	Performance/Narrative	
2025	"Cannibal" (with WARGASM)	Inertia	Chris Wade		

== Other appearances ==
The following songs have been made, remixed or covered by Pendulum, and have not appeared on any studio album or single released by Pendulum.

=== Notable compilation appearances ===
Year	Song	Release
2003	"Vault"	Kingz of the Rollers EP Volume 3
2004	"Toxic Shock"	The Sideshow EP: Chapter 1
2004	"Kingston Vampires" (with Fresh)	Jungle Sound: The Bassline Strikes Back!
2004	"Masochist"	Jungle Sound: The Bassline Strikes Back!
2005	"Another Planet" (VIP mix)	Bass Invaderz
2006	"Masochist" (VIP mix)	Jungle Sound: Gold
2008	"Violet Hill" (Coldplay cover)	Radio 1's Live Lounge – Volume 3

=== Guest appearances ===
Year	Song	Artist	Release
2006	"Babylon Rising"	Fresh & Singing Fats	Escape from Planet Monday

=== Studio appearances as remixer ===
Year	Song	Artist	Release
2004	"Tonite"	Concord Dawn	"Tonite" (Pendulum remix) / "Appollo 13" single
2004	"Submarines"	Fresh	"Submarines" CD single
2004	"Pack of Wolves"	Nightbreed	"Pack of Wolves" CD maxi single
2004	"Bacteria"	Ed Rush & Optical	The Remixes Vol. 2 single
2005	"Just a Ride" (Adam F & Pendulum music mix)	Jem	"Just a Ride" CD maxi single
2010	"Stay Too Long"	Plan B	"Stay Too Long" single
