= Immersion (album) =

Studio album by Pendulum
- Released: 21 May 2010
- Recorded: 2008–2010
- Genre: Electronic rock; industrial rock; drum and bass
- Length: 67:14
- Label: Warner Music UK; Earstorm; Atlantic
- Producer: Rob Swire; Gareth McGrillen

Pendulum chronology
Live at Brixton Academy (2009)	Immersion (2010)	The Reworks (2018)

Singles from Immersion
- 1. "Watercolour" Released: 1 May 2010; 2. "Witchcraft" Released: 18 July 2010; 3. "The Island" Released: 19 September 2010; 4. "Crush" Released: 16 January 2011

Professional ratings
Aggregate scores
Source	Rating
Metacritic	63/100
Review scores
Source	Rating
AllMusic	3/5 stars
Alternative Press	favourable
BBC Music	favourable
NME	4/10
PopMatters	6/10 stars
Rock Sound	8/10
Sputnikmusic	3.0/5

Immersion is the third studio album by the Australian drum and bass band Pendulum. The album was announced in early 2009, with the name being confirmed in December 2009. The album was released on 21 May 2010 in Australia and Ireland, and on 24 May for the rest of the world, followed by a UK tour of the album. In January 2010, Pendulum hosted the album preview Ear Storm event at Matter in London in which many top DJs performed sets of their own with Pendulum being the headliners.

The album was finished on 18 April 2010 and mastered by Brian Gardner at Bernie Grundman Mastering Studios in Los Angeles.

Immersion peaked at number one on the UK Albums Chart in its first week of release. The album features a variety of sounds. Although drum and bass is highly featured, electro, house and metal styles are also within the 67-minute long album.

The album features collaborations with Liam Howlett, Steven Wilson and the Swedish melodic death metal band In Flames.

== Track listing ==
All tracks are written by Rob Swire, except where noted.

No.	Title	Writer(s)	Length
1.	"Genesis"		1:09
2.	"Salt in the Wounds"		6:38
3.	"Watercolour"		5:04
4.	"Set Me on Fire"		5:02
5.	"Crush"		4:13
6.	"Under the Waves"	Swire; Paul Harding; Ben Mount	4:54
7.	"Immunize" (featuring Liam Howlett)	Swire; Liam Howlett	4:36
8.	"The Island – Pt.I (Dawn)"		5:20
9.	"The Island – Pt.II (Dusk)"		4:09
10.	"Comprachicos"	Swire; Gareth McGrillen	2:48
11.	"The Vulture"	Swire; Mount	4:03
12.	"Witchcraft"	Swire; McGrillen	4:12
13.	"Self vs. Self" (featuring In Flames)	Swire; Björn Gelotte; Anders Fridén	4:45
14.	"The Fountain" (featuring Steven Wilson)	Swire; Steven Wilson	5:00
15.	"Encoder"	Swire; Peredur ap Gwynedd	5:21

Deluxe version (iTunes)
No.	Title	Length
16.	"Watercolour" (deadmau5 remix)	6:06
17.	"Watercolour" (Emalkay remix)	5:07
18.	"Witchcraft" (Rob Swire's drum-step mix)	5:44
19.	"Witchcraft" (John B remix)	6:53
20.	"Witchcraft" (Chuckie remix)	4:59
21.	"Witchcraft" (Netsky remix)	4:56
22.	"The Island"	9:29
23.	"The Island" (Tiësto remix)	6:45
24.	"The Island" (Cicada remix)	7:12
25.	"The Island" (Steve Angello, AN21 and Max Vangeli remix)	6:40
26.	"The Island" (Lenzman remix)	4:57
27.	"The Island" (Madeon remix)	4:06
28.	"The Island" (Statelapse remix)	5:15
29.	"Watercolour" (video)	3:29
30.	"Witchcraft" (video)	3:52
31.	"The Island" (video)	3:40
32.	"The Making of Immersion" (video)	11:15
33.	"Making the Immersion Artwork" (video)	4:34
34.	"Witchcraft – Making of the Music video" (video)	3:48
35.	"Pendulum – Live at Wembley" (video)	4:12
36.	"Pendulum Live – Tour Graphics" (video)	5:56
Total length:		118:55

Sample credits

- "We Do the Killing" by Cocoa Tea, written by C. Scott, W. Riley, used on "Set Me on Fire"

=== B-side ===
The track "Ransom" was originally included but it was later dropped as it "didn't fit the sound of the album". The band later stated that it would either be released "as a free download to fans or a B-side but it will definitely see the light of day". Rob Swire later stated that "Ransom" would not be released because he found the song to be "boring" after the intro; however, he added that most of the project files for the song were corrupted when his MacBook hard drive malfunctioned. However, on 6 April 2011, "Ransom" was released as a download-only single on the group's website in aid of Japan's earthquake appeal, and it entered the UK Singles Chart at number 193 the following week.

== Personnel ==
Writing, performance and production credits are adapted from the album liner notes.

=== Pendulum ===
- Rob Swire – vocals on "Watercolour", "Crush", "Under the Waves", "Immunize", "The Island – Pt.I (Dawn)", "The Island – Pt. II (Dusk)", "Comprachicos", "Witchcraft", "Self vs. Self", guitar on "Under the Waves", "Comprachicos"
- Ben Mount – vocals on "The Vulture"
- Peredur ap Gwynedd – guitar on "Crush", "The Vulture", "Witchcraft", "Self vs. Self", "The Fountain", "Encoder"
- Gareth McGrillen – bass guitar on "Comprachicos", "Witchcraft"
- KJ Sawka – drums on "Crush", "Comprachicos", "Witchcraft", "Self vs. Self", "Encoder", percussions on "The Island – Pt.I (Dawn)", "The Island – Pt. II (Dusk)", "The Vulture", "Encoder"

=== Guest musicians ===
- Steven Wilson – vocals on "The Fountain"
- In Flames on "Self vs. Self"
  - Anders Fridén – vocals
  - Björn Gelotte – guitar
  - Peter Iwers – bass guitar

=== Additional musicians ===
- Andy Greenwood – brass on "Watercolour"
- Andy Wood – brass on "Watercolour"
- Craig Wild – brass on "Watercolour"
- Adrian Revell – brass on "Watercolour"
- Martin Williams – brass on "Watercolour"
- Samantha Beagley – vocals on "The Vulture"

=== Production and design ===
- Rob Swire – production, mixing
- Gareth McGrillen – production, except for "Genesis" and "The Fountain"
- Liam Howlett – production on "Immunize"
- Brad Kohn – mixing (drums only) on "Crush" and "Encoder", editing assistant
- Brian "Big Bass" Gardner – mastering
- Storm Thorgerson (in collaboration with Valp Maciej Hajnrich) – artwork

=== Studios ===
- Pendulum HQ – mixing
- Brain Gardner Mastering – mastering

== Charts ==
=== Weekly charts ===
Chart (2010)	Peak position
Australian Albums (ARIA)	3
Austrian Albums (Ö3 Austria)	20
Belgian Albums (Ultratop Flanders)	67
Belgian Albums (Ultratop Wallonia)	98
Dutch Albums (Album Top 100)	48
Finnish Albums (Suomen virallinen lista)	50
German Albums (Offizielle Top 100)	62
Greek Albums (IFPI)	25
Irish Albums (IRMA)	15
Japanese Albums (Oricon)	41
New Zealand Albums (RMNZ)	3
Scottish Albums (OCC)	3
Swiss Albums (Schweizer Hitparade)	43
UK Albums (OCC)	1
United States Dance/Electronic Albums (Billboard)	6
United States Heatseekers Albums (Billboard)	4
United States Top Rock Albums (Billboard)	50

=== Year-end charts ===
Chart (2010)	Position
Australian Albums (ARIA)	49
UK Albums (OCC)	56

Chart (2011)	Position
Australian Dance Albums (ARIA)	26
UK Albums (OCC)	190

== Certifications ==
Region	Certification	Certified units/sales
Australia (ARIA)	Gold	35,000^{^}
United Kingdom (BPI)	Platinum	300,000^{^}
^{^} Shipments figures based on certification alone.

== Release history ==
Region	Release date	Format	Edition
Various	21 May 2010	Digital download	Standard
Ireland	21 May 2010	12-inch LP; CD	Standard
Australia	21 May 2010	12-inch LP; CD	Standard
United Kingdom	24 May 2010	12-inch LP; CD	Standard
United Kingdom	16 January 2011	Digital download	iTunes edition
United States	25 January 2011	12-inch LP; CD; digital download	Standard; iTunes edition
