= Live at Brixton Academy (Pendulum album) =

Live album by Pendulum
- Released: 12 June 2009
- Recorded: December 2008
- Venues: Brixton Academy, London, England
- Genres: Drum and bass, electronic rock, alternative dance
- Length: 79:16 (CD); 95:30 (DVD)
- Labels: Earstorm; Warner Bros.; Breakbeat Kaos
- Director: Paul Caslin
- Producer: Mike Downs

Pendulum chronology
In Silico (2008)	Live at Brixton Academy (2009)	Immersion (2010)

Live at Brixton Academy is the first live album by the Australian drum and bass band Pendulum, recorded live at the Brixton Academy in London, England and released on 12 June 2009 by Warner Bros. Records, Earstorm and Breakbeat Kaos. It was produced by Mike Downs and directed by Paul Caslin. The concert features live footage filmed by 12 fans. Six tracks on the DVD extra are fan only edits, with an audience heavy 5.1 remix. The live album was available for pre-order on 8 June 2009, just a week before its release. On 9 June 2009 a special premiere of the live show was put on in an exclusive theater which Pendulum attended. Both the audio CD and DVD contain their live cover of Metallica's Master of Puppets.

== Track listing ==
CD
No.	Title	Length
1.	"Star Wipe Intro (Ø) (by Rob Swire)"	1:57
2.	"Showdown"	5:53
3.	"Fasten Your Seatbelt"	5:50
4.	"Another Planet"	4:26
5.	"Voodoo People" (Pendulum remix)	4:48
6.	"Propane Nightmares"	6:04
7.	"Blood Sugar"	5:16
8.	"The Other Side"	5:27
9.	"Different"	5:57
10.	"Master of Puppets"	1:34
11.	"Slam"	4:19
12.	"Hold Your Colour"	7:13
13.	"Countdown"	2:19
14.	"Tarantula"	4:58
15.	"Granite"	4:56
16.	"The Tempest"	8:19
Total length:		79:16

DVD
No.	Title	Length
1.	"Star Wipe Intro (Ø) (by Rob Swire)"	1:57
2.	"Showdown"	5:53
3.	"Fasten Your Seatbelt"	5:50
4.	"Another Planet"	4:26
5.	"Voodoo People" (Pendulum remix)	4:48
6.	"Propane Nightmares"	6:04
7.	"9,000 Miles"	3:51
8.	"Midnight Runner"	6:20
9.	"Mutiny"	4:42
10.	"Blood Sugar"	5:16
11.	"The Other Side"	5:27
12.	"Different"	5:57
13.	"Master of Puppets"	1:34
14.	"Slam"	4:19
15.	"Hold Your Colour"	7:13
16.	"Tarantula"	7:17
17.	"Granite"	4:56
18.	"The Tempest"	8:19
19.	"Credits"	1:21
Total length:		95:30

== Personnel ==
- Rob Swire - vocals, synths
- Gareth McGrillen - bass guitar
- Peredur ap Gwynedd - guitar
- Paul Kodish - drums
- Ben Mount - MC
