= Watercolour (song) =

2010 single by Pendulum

Single by Pendulum

from the album Immersion
- Released: 1 May 2010
- Recorded: 2008–2010
- Genre: Electronic rock; drum and bass
- Length: 5:04 (album version); 3:28 (radio edit)
- Label: Warner Music UK; Earstorm
- Songwriter: Rob Swire
- Producers: Rob Swire; Gareth McGrillen

Pendulum singles chronology
"Showdown" (2009)	"Watercolour" (2010)	"Witchcraft" (2010)

Alternative cover
- Remixes vinyl

"Watercolour" is the first single from the third album Immersion by Australian drum and bass band Pendulum. This song has been remixed by dubstep artist Emalkay and by progressive house artist Deadmau5. The video was shot on 16 March 2010 at a studio in East London featuring around 70 fans as extras. A behind-the-scenes video was released on the official Pendulum website. The music video was released as a Myspace exclusive on 31 March.

"Watercolour" debuted at number four on the UK Singles Chart, making it the band's highest-charting single in the United Kingdom. The song also featured on F1 2010 and Need for Speed: Hot Pursuit. The song was also used in a promo during the 2011 A-League Grand Final. It featured in the 2011 series of the BBC programme Traffic Cops. Pendulum performed "Watercolour" at the 2011 MTV Europe Music Awards at Belfast City Hall in Belfast, Northern Ireland, United Kingdom during the backstage show on 6 November 2011.

== Track listings ==
iTunes digital bundle
(released 1 May 2010)

1. "Watercolour" – 5:04
2. "Watercolour" (radio edit) – 3:28
3. "Watercolour" (Deadmau5 remix) – 6:06
4. "Watercolour" (Emalkay remix) – 5:07
5. "Watercolour" (music video) – 3:29

Digital single
(released 2 May 2010)

1. "Watercolour" – 5:04

CD single
(released 3 May 2010)

1. "Watercolour" – 5:04
2. "Watercolour" (radio edit) – 3:28
3. "Watercolour" (Deadmau5 remix) – 6:06
4. "Watercolour" (Emalkay remix) – 5:07

12-inch vinyl single
(released 3 May 2010)

A. "Watercolour" – 5:04
B. "Watercolour" (DJ edit) – 4:35

12-inch remixes vinyl single
(released 3 May 2010)

A. "Watercolour" (Deadmau5 remix) – 6:06
B. "Watercolour" (Emalkay remix) – 5:07

== Personnel ==
Pendulum

- Rob Swire – writer, producer, vocals, synthesisers, mixing
- Gareth McGrillen – production assistant
- KJ Sawka – acoustic drums

Other contributors

- Andy Greenwood – trumpet
- Craig Wild – trumpet
- Andy Wood – trombone
- Adrian Revell – brass
- Martin Williams – brass
- Emalkay – remix
- Deadmau5 – remix

== Chart performance ==
As predicted by midweek sales estimates, "Watercolour" debuted on the UK Singles Chart on 9 May 2010 at number four, marking Pendulum's most successful single after "Propane Nightmares" reached number nine in 2008. In its second week in the chart, the single fell to number 13. On 26 May 2010, the single fell to number 22, before climbing three places to number 19 following the release of the album.

"Watercolour" also debuted on the Australian Singles Chart on 10 May 2010 at number 37. The following week, the single fell 10 places to number 47. The single also debuted the same day on the New Zealand Top 40 chart at number 37. However, the single dropped out of the top 40 the following week. "Watercolour" was listed on Triple J's Hottest 100, 2010 countdown and came in at number 69.

=== Weekly charts ===
Chart (2010–2011)	Peak position
Australia (ARIA)	37
Canada (Jam!)	62
New Zealand (Recorded Music NZ)	37
UK Singles (OCC)	4

=== Year-end charts ===
Chart (2010)	Position
UK Singles (OCC)	139

== Certifications ==
Region	Certification	Certified units/sales
New Zealand (RMNZ)	Platinum	30,000^{‡}
United Kingdom (BPI)	Gold	400,000^{‡}
^{‡} Sales+streaming figures based on certification alone.

== Release history ==
Region	Release date	Format	Catalogue
Various	1 May 2010	iTunes	None
Various	2 May 2010	Download single	None
United Kingdom	3 May 2010	12-inch single	WEA470T
United Kingdom	3 May 2010	CD single	WEA470CD
