= Witchcraft (Pendulum song) =

Single by Pendulum

from the album Immersion
- Released: 18 July 2010
- Recorded: 2009–2010
- Genre: Drum and bass; electronic rock; alternative metal
- Length: 4:12 (album version); 3:52 (video edit)
- Label: Warner Music UK; Earstorm; Breakbeat Kaos
- Songwriter: Rob Swire
- Producers: Rob Swire; Gareth McGrillen

Pendulum singles chronology
| "Watercolour" (2010) | "Witchcraft" (2010) | "The Island" (2010) |

"Witchcraft" is the second single from Australian drum and bass band Pendulum from their third studio album, Immersion. It was released as a digital single on iTunes on 18 July 2010, with the CD single being released the following day. It debuted at number sixty-two on the UK Singles Chart following high numbers of downloads from the release of the album. The music video was shot on 2 June 2010 and finished on 25 June, as confirmed by Rob Swire's Twitter feed.

The single includes a drumstep mix by Rob Swire, remixes by drum and bass DJs and producers John B and Netsky, and a remix by house DJ and producer Chuckie. An exclusive video of "Witchcraft" was placed on the Pendulum members section "The Other Side". The single artwork shares a similarity with the artwork for Pendulum's debut album, Hold Your Colour. The song is used in many sport montages one of which being the end of season review by the BBC for the 2010–11 Formula One season. The song was also featured in Season 3 of the Netflix Series, Heartstopper.

== Meaning ==
There was some constant controversy over the song’s name and meaning of lyrics, primarily due to Pendulum's cryptic style. However, Rob Swire later discussed the meaning of several Pendulum songs at a music festival in Perth. He said that the song speaks out against violence towards women, and compares it to witchcraft, a "highly devastating act that people try to avoid, but it still occurs although we rarely see it".

== Chart performance ==
"Witchcraft" debuted on the UK Singles Chart on 30 May 2010 at number 62, following the release of the album, "Immersion", which also reached number-one that week. The single however, fell out of the top 100 on its second week in the chart. On 11 July 2010, the single began to climb its way back up the UK Singles Chart reaching number 113. The single then climbed back into the top 100 at number 67 on 18 July. Upon physical release, the single climbed 38 places to a current peak of number 29, marking the band's third most successful single alongside "Granite" and fifth top 40 single in the UK.

== Other media ==
To help promote the single, Pendulum created a "Witchcraft Experiment" Facebook application. When used, the viewer is taken into an impression of their profiles, with people on their friends list typing various lyrics out while the song played in the background. Pendulum have also released an animated "Witchcraft" screensaver, along with an image to use on Facebook as well. Bullet for My Valentine also played an acoustic version of this song on BBC Radio 1. It was also used in the soundtrack of the video game WRC FIA World Rally Championship.

== Formats and track listings ==
"Witchcraft" was written and produced by Rob Swire and Gareth McGrillen.

iTunes bundle

1. "Witchcraft" – 4:12
2. "Witchcraft" (Rob Swire's drum-step mix) – 5:44
3. "Witchcraft" (Chuckie remix) – 6:14
4. "Witchcraft" (John B remix) – 6:53
5. "Witchcraft" (Netsky remix) – 4:56
6. "Witchcraft" (music video) – 3:52

12-inch vinyl single

A. "Witchcraft" (Rob Swire's drum-step mix) – 5:44
B. "Witchcraft" (Netsky remix) – 4:56

CD single

1. "Witchcraft" – 4:12
2. "Witchcraft" (Rob Swire's drum-step mix) – 5:44
3. "Witchcraft" (Chuckie remix) – 6:14
4. "Witchcraft" (John B remix) – 6:53
5. "Witchcraft" (Netsky remix) – 4:56

== Personnel ==
Pendulum

- Rob Swire – writer, producer, vocals, synthesizers, mixing, remix
- Gareth McGrillen – production assistant, bass guitar, vocals
- Peredur ap Gwynedd – guitar
- KJ Sawka – acoustic drums

Other contributors:

- Netsky – remix
- John B – remix
- Chuckie – remix

== Charts ==
| Chart (2010) | Peak position |
|---|---|
| Australia (ARIA) | 56 |
| Scotland Singles (Official Charts) | 27 |
| UK Singles (Official Charts) | 29 |

== Certifications ==
| Region | Certification | Certified units/sales |
|---|---|---|
| New Zealand (RMNZ) | Platinum | 30,000^{‡} |
| United Kingdom (BPI) | Gold | 400,000^{‡} |
^{‡} Sales+streaming figures based on certification alone.
