= Promise Land (DJs) =

Italian DJ duo

- Origin: Milan, Italy
- Genres: Progressive house; house; electro house
- Years active: 1995–present
- Labels: Spinnin' Records, Size Records, Dirty Dutch Music, Flamingo Recordings, Hexagon, Mixmash Records
- Members: Nazario Pelusi; Fabio Ranucci
- Website: djpromiseland.com/

Promise Land (born 4 October 1994) is an Italian DJ and production duo from Milan, consisting of Nazario Pelusi and Fabio Ranucci.

"Why I Still Love You", "Bad DJ", and "Noise" are their main success, respectively ranked 14th, 13th and 23rd in the top 100 established by Beatport.

== Discography ==
=== Extended plays ===
Title	Album details
Blippy EP	Released: 2 November 2016; Format: Digital download; Label: Stmpd Rcrds

=== Singles ===
==== Charted singles ====
Year	Title	Peak chart positions		Album
Year	Title	BEL Dance	BEL Dance BU	Album
2010	"Last Night A DJ Saved My Life"	20	—	Non-album singles
2012	"Breaking Up" (with Chuckie featuring Amanda Wilson)	—	2	Non-album singles
2015	"Memories Will Fade" (with Yves V featuring Mitch Thompson)	—	17	Non-album singles
"—" denotes a recording that did not chart or was not released in that territory.

==== Other singles ====
- 2009: We Save Your Life [Netswork Records]
- 2009: Last Night a Dj Saved My Life [Netswork Records]
- 2010: You Can't Stop the Love (with Provenzano) [Netswork Records]
- 2010: Feel the Pushing [Netswork Records]
- 2010: Push the Feeling On [Netswork Records]
- 2011: Wrong [Dirty Dutch Music]
- 2011: Heaven (with COZi) [Netswork Records]
- 2011: Piece of Heaven (Vocal Radio) (with COZi) [Netswork Records]
- 2011: Slipped Disc (with MYNC) [Cr2 Records]
- 2011: Endless (with Gregori Klosman) [Flamingo Recordings]
- 2011: Killer [Dirty Dutch Music]
- 2011: Never Be Lonely [Subliminal]
- 2011: Alarma (Make Your Body Sing) (with Dimitri Vegas & Like Mike, Mitch Crown) [Smash The House]
- 2012: Never Be Lonely [Strictly Rhythm]
- 2012: Breaking Up (with Chuckie, Amanda Wilson) [Dirty Dutch]
- 2013: Gangsta [Spinnin Records]
- 2013: Rulez [Spinnin Records]
- 2013: Noise (with Junior Black) [DOORN (Spinnin)]
- 2013: Bad Dj [Size Records]
- 2013: Sun Shine Down (featuring Alicia Madison) [Mixmash Records]
- 2014: Vega [DOORN (Spinnin)]
- 2015: Burn (with Chuckie) [Dirty Dutch Music]
- 2015: Why I Still Love You [Size Records]
- 2015: Memories Will Fade (with Yves V) [Smash The House]
- 2015: Love I Feel [Sosumi]
- 2015: Alright [Flamingo Recordings]
- 2015: Faithfully (with Shawnee Taylor) [Ones To Watch (Mixmash Records)]
- 2015: Let the Groove [Sosumi]
- 2015: Wood
- 2016: X-Press [DOORN (Spinnin)]
- 2016: Rebound [DOORN (Spinnin)]
- 2016: Rebound to the Beat (featuring Luciana) [DOORN (Spinnin)]
- 2016: Scratchin' (with Daddy's Groove) [Doorn Records]
- 2016: Pressure (with Matt Nash) [Staar Traxx]
- 2019: I N33D [Hexagon Records]

=== Remixes ===
- 2009: Fedde Le Grand, Mitch Crown - Scared Of Me featuring Mitch Crown (Promise Land & Provenzano Remix) [Flamingo Recordings]
- 2009: The Playin' Stars - You Needed Me (Promise Land Remix) [Rise]
- 2010: Ambush, Chuckie, Hardwell - Move It 2 The Drum (Promise Land Remix) [Dirty Dutch Music]
- 2011: Flo Rida - Who Dat Girl (Promise Land Instrumental) [Poe Boy/Atlantic]
- 2011: Chuckie, Gregori Klosman - Mutfakta (Promise Land Remix) [Dirty Dutch Music]
- 2011: Dim Chris - You Found Me (featuring Amanda Wilson) (Promise Land Miami 305 Mix) [Paradise Records]
- 2011: John Dahlback - You're In My Heart (Promise Land Remix) [Mutants]
- 2011: DJ Bam Bam, Alex Peace - Keep Movin' (Promise Land Remix) [Big Beat]
- 2012: Rebecca Stella - Give Me That O (Promise Land Remix) [Ultra]
- 2012: Jeremy Carr - Just One Breath (Promise Land Remix Extended) [Delirious]
- 2012: Swedish House Mafia - Don't You Worry Child (featuring John Martin) (Promise Land Remix) [Virgin UK]
- 2013: Max Vangeli, AN21 - Glow (Promise Land vs. AN21 & Max Vangeli Remix) [Size Records]
- 2014: Flatdisk - One More Chance (Promise Land Edit) [Cr2 Records]
- 2015: Tristan Garner, Norman Doray, Errol Reid - Last Forever 2015 (Promise Land Remix) [Cr2 Mainroom]
