= Crush (Pendulum song) =

Single by Pendulum

from the album Immersion
- Released: 16 January 2011
- Recorded: 2009–2010
- Genre: Drum and bass; electronic rock; alternative metal
- Length: 3:22 (single version); 4:13 (album version)
- Label: Warner Music UK; Earstorm
- Songwriter(s): Rob Swire
- Producer(s): Rob Swire; Gareth McGrillen

Pendulum singles chronology
"The Island" (2010)	"Crush" (2011)	"Ransom" (2011)

"Crush" is the fourth single from Australian drum and bass band Pendulum released from their third studio album, Immersion. Its release was set to coincide with the iTunes Immersion LP. The official video for the song was released on 7 January 2011 by BBC Radio 1 on their website. It was directed by Tim Qualtrough, who previously directed the official video for the single "Propane Nightmares". A "Crush" screensaver was released to promote the single. The song reached number 92 on the UK Singles Chart, staying on the chart for one week.

== Track listing ==
Promotional CD • digital download
No.	Title	Length
1.	"Crush" (radio edit)	3:22

== Personnel ==
Pendulum

- Rob Swire – writer, producer, vocals, synthesizers, mixing
- Gareth McGrillen – production assistant, bass guitar
- Peredur ap Gwynedd – guitar
- KJ Sawka – acoustic drums

Other contributors

- Brad Kohn – mixing acoustic drums

== Charts ==
Chart (2011)	Peak position
UK Singles (OCC)	92
