= Congorock =

Italian record producer and DJ

- Born: Rocco Rampino; 4 July 1983 (age 43); Lecce, Italy
- Genres: Electro, house, dance-punk, progressive house, electro house
- Occupations: DJ, music producer
- Instruments: Guitar, bass guitar, electric guitar
- Years active: 2008–present
- Labels: Dim Mak Records; Fool's Gold Records; Ultra Records (2011–present)
- Website: congorock.com

Rocco Rampino (born 4 July 1983 in Lecce), better known as Congorock, is an Italian producer and DJ, best known for his song "Babylon,” released in 2010.

In 2012, Congorock joined Rihanna on her 777 Tour.

The song "Sirius" with Alle Benassi was included on the soundtrack for the 2012 film Chronicle by Josh Trank.

== Musical career ==
In 2007 when moving to Los Angeles in the United States he began working with The Bloody Beetroots' Bob Rifo (also from Italy). The two began working together and eventually released their debut single at the same time, as a collaboration between the two. The song was called "Rombo" and featured on The Bloody Beetroots debut EP of the same name. The Rombo EP featured 5 songs. Congorock once stated in an interview on "The Bloody Beetroots Gazette" that he was Crookers #1 Fan, he was also influenced by the Basement Jaxx album Rooty.

In 2010 Rampino joined with Sir Bob Cornelius Rifo, Steve Aoki and Scott Cogo to form the dance-punk band Rifoki. They released one EP named Sperm Donor in winter 2010. The song "Zombie Attack" featuring vocals from punk band Refused along with Bob Rifo's own vocals. "Zombie Attack" was successful enough to be included on the 2010 edition of I Love Techno mixed by Aoki. Also it was included on the Dim Mak compilation Dim Mak Hardcore (Punk) Vault. Rifoki is heavily influenced by rock and metal but it has a dance beat. Rampino plays guitars in the band, Rifo provides vocals and mixdowns along with mixdowns and DJing by Aoki and Cogo.

On the Travis Barker song "Misfits" with Steve Aoki from his album Give the Drummer Some the collaboration between Barker and Aoki counts them both as featured artists. But on the writing credits it states it is written by Rocco Rampino, Sir Bob Cornelius Rifo, Steve Aoki, Scott Cogo and Travis Barker. This makes the song produced by Rifoki as Sir Bob provides vocals and Congorock plays guitars while Steve Aoki and Scott Cogo DJ the track with Travis Barker's drumming.

=== Solo career ===
Congorock eventually released his own EP, Runark, on 17 March 2009. It featured five songs: "Runark", "Runark (Joker of the Scene Remix)", "Exodus", "Hybro" and "Runark (His Majesty Andre Remix)". After Runark, Congorock collaborated with fellow Italian dance-punk duo Blatta & Inesha, they produced Stepoff!/People.

Also in 2008; Congorock collaborated with fellow Italian dance-punk duo Crookers to produce the song "Sbombers" (sometimes written as Sbomberz, S-Bombers or S Bombers). He remixed the song "Bite Your Lip" by Blatta & Inesha and another song "Bubblicious" by electronic artist Rex the Dog.

On 20 April 2010 Congorock released one of his most successful singles to date, "Babylon", featuring an original mix, a dub version and a Lexxapella version. "Babylon" became successful enough to get onto the Ministry of Sound Annual 2011 compilation, which was released in 2010. It was also put onto another Ministry of Sound compilation, this time it was the winter edition of the "Addicted To Bass" series. After the success of "Babylon", Congorock went on to remix the Swedish House Mafia song One.

After the remix of "One", "Babylon" started to receive its own remixes on 7 September 2010. Some of the remixing artists included Proxy, Steve Angello (of Swedish House Mafia) and CJ Bolland.

Congorock's next project was a remix of the Mark Ronson song "Somebody to Love Me". Congorock also went on to remix the Benny Benassi song "Electroman" and "Cinema", the Congorock remix was on the same single as the remix by Skrillex which was nominated as best remix at the 2011 Grammy Awards. On 11 November 2011 Congorock teamed up with Benny Benassi's cousin and co-worker Alle Benassi to produce the song "Sirius". The song would later go on to appear on the soundtrack to the 2012 film Chronicle directed by Josh Trank. Congorock released another single shortly after, this was "Ivory" which was released on 28 November 2011. "Ivory" became successful and would have remixes later on 8 May 2012.

After "Ivory", Congorock remixed The Bloody Beetroots song "Church of Noise" which featured Dennis Lyxzén and Bob Rifo on vocals. On 20 March Congorock released Monolith/Agarta. "Monolith" was included on the Benny Benassi mixed compilation Cavo Paradiso 2012. Congorock also released "Liu Kang's Theme" which was a single from Mortal Kombat: Songs Inspired by the Warriors.

After this Congorock released an "Ivory Remixes EP", the remixing artists included Laidback Luke, The Bloody Beetroots, Mumbai Science and NT89.

He then collaborated with dance project Stereo Massive and Jamaican rapper Sean Paul to create the song "Bless Di Nation".

He then remixed the song "We Run the Night" by Havana Brown and Pitbull. He started working with Barbadian R&B singer Rihanna on her 777 Tour, he also remixed the song "Diamonds".

His most recent project is the remix of the Clockwork song "Titan", he decided the song was good enough already and he wanted to keep the bass drop so he made a Safari Edit instead of an actual remix. It included some drum samples and didn't edit the tempo.

He collaborated with the Swedish/American house duo AN21 & Max Vangeli on the song "Lost" (credited as 'AN21 & Max Vangeli vs Congorock'). It was included on their album People of the Night released through SIZE Records.

After this he has remixed the songs "Cowboy" by Zeds Dead featuring Omar LinX and "Pogo" by Laidback Luke featuring Majestic.

Upon the fall on 2013 Congorock made the song "Minerals" on Ultra Records along with electro house producer Nom De Strip. The song was released on 8 December 2013. The musical style is significantly different from other previous Congorock releases, the song has far less percussion instruments. The song "Seth" was released on 23 December 2013. It was released on Chris Lake's record label Rising Music, the song included many Indian and Egyptian instruments and percussions. The musical style was similar to that of Nom De Strip of whom Congorock previously collaborated. "Seth" is an Egyptian God, so the song's sound and vibe were based on Egyptian elements.

Since then Congorock has collaborated with EDM trio Daddy's Groove on "Synthemilk" and with DJ Clockwork on "Infinite Mana". Both were released on Ultra Music.

In 2015 Congorock released "Nok Nok", a collaboration with fellow electro house producer Mindshake, and another single "Black Sun" with Daddy's Groove.

=== Remix albums ===
Congorock released remix albums (or EP's) for both the songs "Babylon". The remixing artists on the EP include Steve Angello (of Swedish House Mafia), CJ Bolland, and Proxy. The original mix and Lexxapella version are also both on this EP. The cover is a seven sided star which is questioned to be satanic, but is, in fact, a play on words as the ancient goddess Babalon (from the Thelema system) has a heptagram which is used as the "Seal of Babalon". The heptagram is more visible on the remix album but it does actually appear on the original single but is distorted by the dragon picture.

There are also remixes for the song "Ivory". The remixing artists are Laidback Luke, The Bloody Beetroots, Mumbai Science and NT89.

On 8 January 2013, there was remixes released for "Bless Di Nation" featuring Stereo Massive and Sean Paul, there are seven tracks on the EP. Remixing artists include Firebeatz, Clockwork, Valentino Khan, GTA, Torro Torro and Ookay.

== Logo ==
In early 2008 for the song "Rombo" with The Bloody Beetroots the Congorock logo was not included on the cover art for the EP, but by the time of the song "Sbombers" with Crookers the logo was included. At that time it was designed to be similar to an arcade game style, it mounted up in the middle. In 2009 when he released his own EP "Runark" it ascended and then descended on the 'rock' part of the word. On "Stepoff!/People" the Congorock and Blatta & Inesha logos were not stylized and were both written in plain text. When the song "Babylon" was released the logo was dented in the middle and numerous spikes emerged from the corners, two eyes were also in the middle of the second O, the logo and heptagram are more visible on the "Babylon Remixes" album. In 2011 by the release of "Ivory" the logo took an African theme, the O's were slanted; this is how the logo remained until the recent release of the song "Bless Di Nation". The Congorock logo is written in plain white text on "Bless Di Nation", but Sean Paul and Stereo Massive are also written the same way.

Since the release of "Bless Di Nation" the logo has not taken a specific style, on the artwork of the following releases the typography used would differ every time. On the majority of the releases the Congorock logo wasn't styled in any way; with the exception of "Synthemilk" which used the established logo from 2011. No more releases since Synthemilk have used the logo again.

== Musical style ==
At first Congorock's style was mainly dance-punk and electro, his style then changed to moombahton when he released "Babylon". His style varied to electro house afterwards but still included African percussion instruments. Ivory and Sirius were heavy on electro house, whereas the percussions seemed to be less dominant when he remixed Zedd's "Spectrum", the sound changed to a more house sound, this has remained on songs such as "Bless Di Nation", but percussion was then used. Congorock has not used such instruments on his recent remixes.

On recent songs such as "Minerals" and "Seth" has been more electronic sounds backed by some percussion instruments but not as predominant as were previously featured on songs such as "Babylon" and "Monolith". On the Congorock remix of the Laidback Luke song "Pogo" featuring British grime rapper MC Majestic there is a heavy hardcore bass sound, similar to that in moombahton and hard dance. The recent song "Synthemilk" with Daddy's Groove is mainly electro house but some snare drums are audible. The following song "Infiniate Mana" with DJ Clockwork is of a hard house style; of which Clockwork is known for.

In 2015 Congorock did not differ heavily in musical style, his tracks would continue to have an electro house BPM, similar synths and percussion's were used, but the "Congo" influence once seen in Congorock's style had seemed to mostly fade away. No EDM subgenres (such as Moombahton and Dutch house) were produced anymore. The releases "Nok Nok" and "Black Sun" were both collaborations and included a mass amount of the collaborating artists style within the track. However the "Congo" percussion's were clearly audible as the bass line for "Nok Nok".

== Discography ==
=== Singles/EP's ===
- Rombo (with The Bloody Beetroots) (2008)
- Sbombers (with Crookers) (2008)
- Runark EP (2009)
- Stepoff!/People (with Blatta & Inesha) (2009)
- Babylon (featuring Mr. Lexx) (2010)
- Babylon Remixes EP (2010)
- Kapongo Dance (with Berou and Canblaster) (2011)
- Sirius (2011)
- Ivory (2011)
- Monolith/Agarta (2012)
- Liu Kang's Theme (2012)
- Ivory Remixes EP (2012)
- Bless Di Nation (with Sean Paul and Stereo Massive) (2012)
- Lost (vs AN21 & Max Vangeli) (2012)
- Bless Di Nation Remixes EP (with Sean Paul and Stereo Massive) (2013)
- Minerals (with Nom De Strip) (2013)
- Seth (2014)
- Synthemilk (with Daddy's Groove) (2014)
- Infinite Mana (with Clockwork) (2014)
- Nok Nok (with Mindshake) (2015)
- Black Sun (with Daddy's Groove) (2015)

=== Remixes ===
- Nic Sarno – Hot Jack (2008, ESP Records)
- Blatta & Inesha Feat Rqm - Bite Your Lip (2008, Hell Yeah! Music)
- Keatch Feat Gehts Noch – Call It Love (2008)
- Bugo – Primitivo (2008)
- Favretto Feat Naan – What's Your Name? (2008)
- Rex the Dog - Bubblicious (2009, Universal Music Group)
- Djedjotronic Feat Spoek – Dirty & Hard (2009, Boysnoize Records)
- All Leather – I Don't Hate Fags, God Does (2009, Dim Mak Records)
- Fukkk Offf – More Than Friends (2009, Coco Machete)
- D-Bag Feat Naan – Up to the Boy (2009)
- Romanthony's Nightvision – Never F*** (2009, Launch Entertainment)
- JFK of MSTRKRFT & St. Andrew – Face Pump (2010, Teenage Riot Recordings)
- Swedish House Mafia – One (feat Pharrell) (2010, Virgin Records)
- Mark Ronson Feat Boy George & Andrew Wyatt – Somebody to Love Me (2010, Universal Music Group)
- Benny Benassi Feat T-Pain – Electroman (2011, Ultra Records)
- Berou & Canblaster – Kapongo Dance (2011, Moveltraxx)
- Benny Benassi Feat Gary Go – Cinema (2011, Ultra Records)
- The Bloody Beetroots Feat Dennis Lyxzén – Church of Noise (2011, Ultra Records)
- Havana Brown Feat Pitbull – We Run the Night (2012, Universal Music Group)
- Zedd Feat Matthew Koma – Spectrum (2012, Polydor Records)
- Rihanna – Diamonds (2012, Virgin Records)
- Clockwork – Titan (2012, Mad Decent)
- Zeds Dead & Omar LinX – Cowboy (2013, Ultra Records)
- Laidback Luke feat Majestic – Pogo (2013, Mixmash Records)
