= The Island (Pendulum song) =

Single by Pendulum

from the album Immersion
- Released: 19 September 2010 (digital); 20 September 2010 (CD); 8 November 2010 (vinyl)
- Recorded: 2009–2010
- Genre: Progressive house; electro house
- Length: 9:30; Album versions: 5:20 "The Island – Pt. I (Dawn)"; 4:09 "The Island – Pt. II (Dusk)"
- Label: Warner Music UK; Earstorm; Breakbeat Kaos
- Songwriter: Rob Swire
- Producers: Rob Swire; Gareth McGrillen

Pendulum singles chronology
"Witchcraft" (2010)	"The Island" (2010)	"Crush" (2011)

"The Island" is the third single from Australian drum and bass band Pendulum to be released from their third studio album, Immersion. It was released on 19 September 2010.

"The Island" is a song split into two parts; "Dawn" and "Dusk", with "Dawn" receiving the majority of radio airplay. In a recent interview, Rob Swire stated that the premise of lyrics has to do with "two young lovers" and how they overcome adversity. The single includes remixes by DJ and record producer Tiësto, and by drum and bass DJ and record producer Lenzman. A Steve Angello, AN21 and Max Vangeli remix of the song was released as a digital single on 24 November 2010. To promote the single, Pendulum also held a remix competition, releasing a free pack of remix stems taken from the "Dawn" part which was won by Madeon at the age of 16. The "Dusk" part uses a sample from Missy Elliott's "I'm Really Hot". In 2018, American DJ and record producer Skrillex released a remix of this song.

Devin Townsend used the song as a structural basis for his song "Save Our Now" from his fifteenth studio album Epicloud.

== Music video ==
The music video for "Part 1 – (Dawn)" was released to Pendulum's official YouTube page on 2 September 2010. It features a woman awaking on a desolate planet, disorientated and confused of her whereabouts. She then glimpses at another human across the wasteland and chases the person across the dead planet, until it is revealed at the end of the video that she is, in fact, chasing herself. The woman is in a time paradox, seeing, and chasing after versions of herself, who in turn, see and chase after her and so on. The woman wears clothes identical to those worn by the clones in the film The Island, and is shot in similar areas.

As of January 2024, the video has received over 12 million views.

== Reception ==
A BBC review declared the song "the absolute standout" of Immersion. The band played it when they went on BBC Radio 1's Live Lounge, and the fan reception to it was overwhelming for the presenter, Fearne Cotton.

== Track listings ==
iTunes bundle
No.	Title	Length
1.	"The Island"	9:30
2.	"The Island" (radio edit)	3:39
3.	"The Island" (Tiësto remix)	6:45
4.	"The Island" (Lenzman remix)	4:57
5.	"The Island – Pt. II (Dusk)" (DJ edit)	4:57
6.	"The Island – Pt. I (Dawn)" (music video)	3:40
Total length:		33:28

CD single
No.	Title	Length
1.	"The Island"	9:30
2.	"The Island" (Radio edit)	3:39
3.	"The Island" (Tiësto remix)	6:45
4.	"The Island" (Lenzman remix)	4:57
Total length:		29:48

12-inch vinyl
No.	Title	Side	Length
1.	"The Island"	A	9:30
2.	"The Island – Pt. II (Dusk)" (DJ edit)	AA	4:57
Total length:			14:27

12-inch vinyl (remixes)
No.	Title	Side	Length
1.	"The Island" (Tiësto remix)	A	6:45
2.	"The Island" (Lenzman remix)	AA	4:57
Total length:			11:42

== Personnel ==
Pendulum

- Rob Swire – writer, producer, vocals, mixing
- Gareth McGrillen – production assistant
- KJ Sawka – percussion

Other contributors

- Tiësto – remix
- Lenzman – remix
- Madeon – remix

== Charts ==
Chart (2010)	Peak position
UK Singles (OCC)	41

== Certifications ==
Region	Certification	Certified units/sales
New Zealand (RMNZ)	Gold	15,000^{‡}
^{‡} Sales+streaming figures based on certification alone.
