= Live at Brixton =

Live at Brixton may refer to:

- Live at Brixton (DMA's album), 2021
- Live at Brixton (Mastodon album), 2014
- Live at Brixton (Of Mice & Men album), 2016
- Live at Brixton by Public Service Broadcasting, 2016

== See also ==
- Live at Brixton Academy (disambiguation)
