= The Best of Chuckie =

Greatest hits album by Chuckie
- Released: November 10, 2013
- Genre: Electronic
- Label: CR2 Records

The Best of Chuckie is a two disc greatest hits album by the Surinamese DJ Chuckie, released in 2013. The album peaked at 100 on the Dutch Charts.

== Track listing ==
List of singles
No.	Title	Writer(s)	Length
1.	"What Happens in Vegas" (featuring Gregor Salto)	Clyde Narain, Gregor Salto	5:44
2.	"Let the Bass Kick in Miami Bitch" (featuring LMFAO)	Clyde Narain, Stefan Gordy, Skyler Gordy	6:53
3.	"Breaking Up" (featuring Promise Land & Amanda Wilson)	Clyde Narain, Amanda Wilson, Nazario Pelusi, Fabio Ranucci	6:22
4.	"Who Is Ready to Jump"	Clyde Narain	3:45
5.	"Make Some Noise" (featuring Junxterjack)	Clyde Narain	4:46
6.	"Together"	Clyde Narain	6:21
7.	"Move It 2 the Drum" (featuring Hardwell & Ambush)	Clyde Narain, Ambush, Robbert Van De Corput	5:33
8.	"The Numb3rs" (featuring Gregori Klosman)	Clyde Narain, Gregori Klosman	6:08
9.	"Electro Dude" (featuring Glowinthedark)	Clyde Narain, Albert Harvey, Kevin Ramos	4:48
10.	"Detroit Bounce"	Clyde Narain	4:21
11.	"Let the Bass Kick (Part 2)" (featuring Jermaine Dupri & Lil Jon)	Clyde Narain, Stefan Gordy, Skyler Gordy, Jermaine Dupri, Silvio Ecomo	3:08

== Charts ==
Chart (2013)	Peak position
Netherlands (Dutch Charts)	100
