= Live at Brixton Academy =

Live at Brixton Academy (or Live at the Brixton Academy) is the name given to a number of live music albums and videos by various artists, recorded at the Brixton Academy in London. Such albums have included:

- You Fat Bastards: Live at the Brixton Academy, a 1991 live album by Faith No More, recorded in 1990
- A New Decade: Live from Brixton Academy, a 1990 live album by Soul II Soul, recorded in 1990
- Live at the Brixton Academy (Brian May album), 1994
- Live at Brixton Academy (Atari Teenage Riot album), 1999
- Live at Brixton Academy (Motörhead album), 2003, recorded in 2000
- Savage – Live at Brixton Academy, a 2018 live album by Gary Numan
- Live at Brixton Academy, a 2003 live DVD by the Inspiral Carpets
- Live at Brixton Academy, a 2004 Good Charlotte DVD
- Live at Brixton Academy (Dido album), a 2005 live album and DVD, recorded in 2004
- Live at Brixton Academy (Pendulum album), a 2009 live album and DVD
- The Poison: Live at Brixton, a 2006 live DVD by Bullet For My Valentine
- Chase & Status: Live at Brixton, a 2011 live album and DVD by Chase & Status

== See also ==
- Other albums recorded at Brixton Academy
- Other videos recorded at Brixton Academy
