= Daddy's Groove =

Italian house band

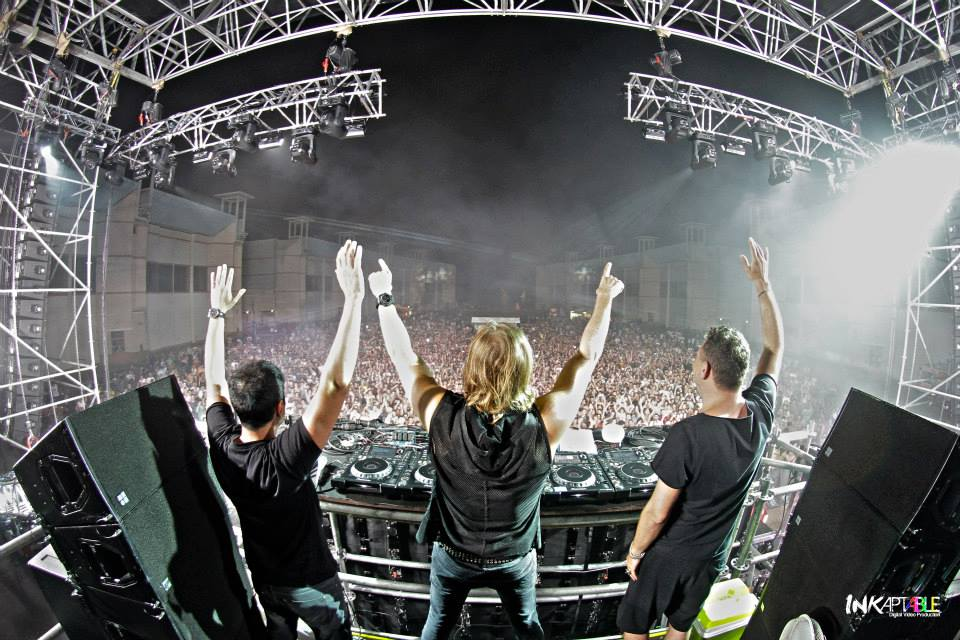
- Daddy's Groove and David Guetta, 2013

Background information
- Origin: Naples, Campania, Italy
- Genres: Electro house, g-house, progressive house
- Years active: 2004–present
- Members: Carlo Grieco; Peppe Folliero
- Past members: Giovanni Romano
- Website: daddysgroove.com

Daddy's Groove are an Italian house music group formed by Carlo Grieco and Peppe Folliero. Based in Naples, Daddy's Groove have co-produced, remixed and handled the mix and master for artists such as Martin Garrix, Bono, David Guetta, Swedish House Mafia, Bob Sinclar, Axwell, Justin Bieber, Lady Gaga, Sia, Nicki Minaj, Celine Dion, Bruno Mars, Whitney Houston, Usher etc., and Italian Artists Alessandra Amoroso, The Kolors, Eros Ramazzotti as among others. They have released singles alongside Bob Sinclar, David Guetta, Kryder, Nervo etc. and scored several first top 10 positions on Beatport. In 2016,2018,2019,2021 Daddy's Groove entered the DJ Mag top 100.

They are signed to the independent label Spinnin Records. They have had several platinum, gold and even diamond records (David Guetta – Play Hard), They have had for 10 years a residency at the Pacha nightclub, and have also gone on multiple world tours.

== History ==
=== 2006–2012: Formation and exposure ===
Initially forming as 'Black Raw' and 'Spit', in 2008, they changed their name to 'Daddy's Groove' which better fit each other's influences. They first gained exposure when Swedish House Mafia's Axwell asked them to remix his track "Nothing but Love". This was followed by an offer to be Swedish House Mafia's opening act for Masquerade Motel in Ibiza. Daddy's Groove was also asked by David Guetta to provide additional production on his album Nothing but the Beat and remixes for some of his tracks.

=== 2013: Surrender and Tomorrowland ===
Daddy's Groove released several tracks on Spinnin' Records, including "Stellar", "Vertigo" (featuring Cryogenix), "Tilt" (also featuring Cryogenix) and "Walking on Air" (featuring Dino), which topped various Beatport charts. They also released "Hurricane" and "Unbelievable" (featuring Rob Adans) on Doorn Records.

During 2013, Daddy's Groove toured extensively around the world, performing throughout the US, Europe, Australia, China, India and Japan. Most of their bookings were at clubs including Ministry of Sound, Marquee Las Vegas, Pacha Sydney, Story Miami, Vision Tokyo and Zouk Singapore. David Guetta booked Daddy's Groove for his Ibiza summer residency, Fuck Me I'm Famous, three years in a row at Pacha Ibiza and Ushuaia.

Catching the attention of Black Eyed Peas' will.i.am, Daddy's Groove were asked to work on the production of Britney Spears' album Britney Jean. They also did the mixing of Lady Gaga's track "Fashion!" on her Artpop album.

By the end of 2013, after signing to Ultra Records, they released "Surrender" together with Mindshake. Their popularity increased further when David Guetta offered them to join him, Nicky Romero and Afrojack on the mainstage of Belgium's biggest festival, Tomorrowland.

=== 2014: Summer festivals ===
Daddy's Groove continued their releases in 2014 with their track "Miners". This was followed by "Synthemilk", a collaborative track with Mindshake, which reached #3 on Beatport's top 10. They performed at major festivals throughout the summer including Global Gathering and Tomorrowland. Their track "Pulse", featuring vocals from Teammate, saw them return to Beatport and iTunes chart.

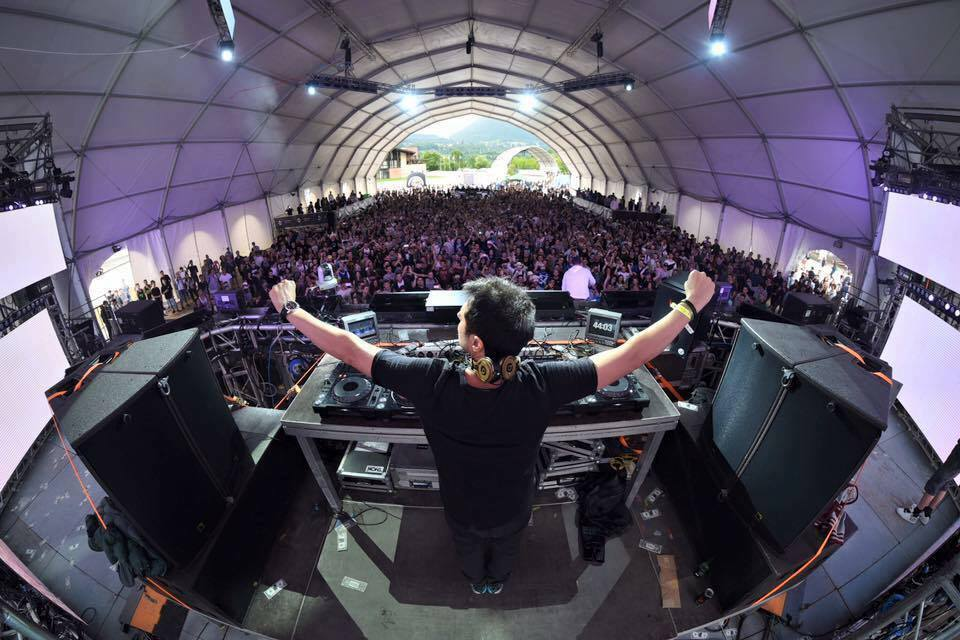
Daddy's Groove on stage

Daddy's Groove were also credited for additional production and drums programming on 7 tracks featured on David Guetta's album Listen.

=== 2015: Weekly residency and Tribe ===
Daddy's Groove released for the first time on Steve Aoki's label Dim Mak the track "Pros & iCons" in 2015. A follow-up to their single "Synthemilk", entitled "Black Sun", was released next. Daddy's Groove secured a weekly residency in the Italian Riviera area and introduced their own party called 'Tribe' at Peter Pun club. Another one of their tracks, "Where I Belong", was premiered at ADE 2015 before hitting radio stations and charts around the world. "I Stay True", featuring Jaxx Da Fishworks & $andhiv, was their last track of the year and released through Kryder's Sosumi Records.

=== 2016: Return to Spinnin' Records ===
In 2016, ten years after their formation, Daddy's Groove returned to Spinnin' Records. Their first release of the year was "WOW!", a collaboration with Mindshake, featuring vocals from Kris Kiss, on sub-label Doorn Records. Shortly after, they revealed "Back to 94" featuring Cimo Fränkel on Spinnin'. A pop influenced track designed to bring back the nostalgia of the '90s, it reached over 300,000 views on Spinnin' Records' YouTube channel in just 2 days. Daddy's Groove then released two further tracks on Doorn Records. "Tribe" featuring Steve Biko was followed by a collaboration with Promise Land in the form of "Scratchin". In October, together with Bob Sinclar, Daddy's Groove released "Burning" on Spinnin'. Their final track of 2016, "Street Life", was created with Kryder and released on his label Cartel Recordings.

=== 2017: "Railgun" with Tom Staar / DJMAG ASEAN ===
Daddy's Groove has partnered with Tom Staar for their first track of 2017, "Railgun", which was released on 6 February on DOORN Records. In July, they produced another record on DOORN Records, "Basement". In October, they were chosen as official ambassadors for DJMAG ASEAN.

=== 2018: "Latido", "BVULGARI" ===
Daddy's Groove started 2018 with "Latido" on Spinnin' Records, in collaboration with Ferdy, followed by the track "BVULGARI". They also made a return on the DJ Mag Poll for 2018. After a few years, Bob Sinclar's Africanism label made its big comeback with the track of Erik Hagleton, "City of Gold" of which Daddy's Groove produced a remix.

=== 2019: Heldeep records, platinum record and DJ Mag Top 100 ===
Daddy's Groove returned with two tracks released on Oliver Heldens' label Heldeep: "Been a Long Time" and "Addicted to Drums" with Ferdy. They also produced the track "Pensare male" for the Kolors and Elodie. The single became a gold record in Italy. They also made the DJ Mag Top 100.

=== 2020 – 2026 ===
In recent years, after a break due to Covid, they have concentrated above all on productions for other artists, after many years they have taken a long break both in recording and with live tours. In recent years, however, there have been many productions in which they have participated both as co-producers and as sound engineers (mix and master) for Artists like Martin Garrix, Afrojack, Bono, David Guetta, Bob Sinclar and Italian artists as Geolier, The Kolors etc.

== Discography ==
=== Singles ===
Title	Year	Record label	Additional information
Stellar	2013	Spinnin' Records	
Hurricane	2013	DOORN Records	
Vertigo	2013	Jack Back Records	Featuring Cryogenix
Tilt	2013	Spinnin' Records	Featuring Cryogenix
Walking on Air	2013	Spinnin' Records	With Dino
Unbelievable	2013	DOORN Records	With Rob Adans
Surrender	2013	Ultra	With Mindshake featuring Iossa
Miners	2014	Ultra	
Synthemilk	2014	Sony Music	With Congorock
Big Love to the Bass	2014	Ultra	With Nari & Milani
BlackOut	2014	Ultra	With Cryogenix
Pulse	2014	Ultra	Featuring Teammate
Back	2014	Spinnin' Records	With Mindshake
Workaholics	2014		Free download
Pros and iCons	2015	Dim Mak	
Black Sun	2015	Ultra	
Where I Belong	2015	Ultra	
Stay True	2015	Sosumi Records	Featuring Jaxx Da Fishworks and $andhiv
WOW!	2016	DOORN Records	With Mindshake featuring Kris Kiss
Back to 94	2016	Spinnin' Records	Featuring Cimo Fränkel
Tribe	2016	DOORN Records	Featuring Steve Biko
Scratchin	2016	DOORN Records	With Promise Land
Burning	2016	Spinnin' Records	With Bob Sinclar
Street Life	2016	Cartel Recordings	With Kryder
Railgun	2017	DOORN Records	With Tom Staar
Basement	2017	DOORN Records	
What Happened Last Night?	2017	Island Records	With The Kolors and Gucci Mane
Latido	2018	Spinnin Records	with Ferdy
Free	2018	Armada	with Bottai
Bvulgari	2018	SPRS	
Been a Long Time	2019	Heldeep Records	
Addicted to Drums	2019	Heldeep Records	With Ferdy
Amame	2019	SPRS	
Feel It	2019	SPRS	With Marc Vedo
Mambara	2019	SPRS	With Mariana Bo
Borracho	2020	SPRS	
Forever Spank	2020	SPRS	With Ron Louis Smith 2nd
Everyone	2020	Heldeep Records	
When We Fall	2020	Spinnin' Records	Featuring Iossa

=== Remixes ===
- 2007: Spit – Falling (Daddy's Groove Remix)
- 2009: Dance Ritual – Cerrone, Little louie Vega (Daddy's Groove Remix)
- 2009: Axwell, Ingrosso, Angel, Laidback Luke – Leave the world behind (Daddy's Groove Remix)
- 2009: Whitney Houston – I Didn't know my own strength (Daddy's Groove Remix)
- 2009: Bob Sinclar – Kiss my agonie (Daddy's Groove Remix)
- 2010: Prok & Fitch – Walk with me (Daddy's Groove vs Axwell Remix)
- 2010: Enrique Iglesias – I Like it (Daddy's Groove Remix)
- 2010: Kylie Minogue – Get outta my way (Daddy's Groove Remix)
- 2010: Axwell – Nothing but love (Daddy's Groove Remix)
- 2011: David Guetta feat Nicky Minaj – Where them girls at (Daddy's Groove Remix)
- 2012: David Guetta – I can only imagine (Daddy's Groove Remix)
- 2013: Ludacris – Rest of my life (Daddy's Groove Remix)
- 2013: Benny Benassi – Dance the pain away (Daddy's Groove Remix)
- 2018: Erik Hagleton – "City of Gold" (Daddy's Groove Remix)
- 2019: Soha – "Les Enfants du Bled" (Daddy's Groove 2019 rework)
- 2020: Moguai – "Everybody's Got to Learn Sometime" (Daddy's Groove Remix)
