= Showdown (Pendulum song) =

Single by Pendulum

from the album In Silico
- Released: 5 January 2009
- Recorded: 2007–2008
- Genre: Electronic rock; drum and bass
- Length: 5:27 (album version); 3:22 (radio edit)
- Label: Warner Music UK
- Songwriter: Rob Swire
- Producer: Rob Swire

Pendulum singles chronology
"The Other Side" (2008)	"Showdown" (2009)	"Watercolour" (2010)

Music video
- Pendulum video – "Showdown"

"Showdown" is the fourth single and first track from the album In Silico by Australian drum and bass band Pendulum. It has been remixed by several artists, including DJ Clipz (who is also Red Light) and Excision. It is also the first single taken from In Silico not to use the album logo prominently on its cover.

The single was originally released through various online music stores on 5 January 2009. It was not available in any physical format until 9 February, when Warner Music UK released the 12-inch picture disc of "Showdown". To help promote the single, Pendulum also released a Space Invaders themed video game which offered players a chance of winning an official framed gold disc of In Silico.

== Background and writing ==
"Showdown" (album version)
30-second sample, demonstrating the distinction between acoustic and sampled drums.

"Showdown" was originally written and produced for the album In Silico by Rob Swire. Although primarily influenced by drum and bass, the song contains prominent elements of both early hard rock and techno, and has even been described as "dance metal" by some critics. "Showdown" opens with vocals from Swire, before going into a heavy guitar riff which is the main focus of the track. It also makes extensive use of both sampled and acoustic drums to produce large and heavy sounds respectively.

== Critical reception ==
"Showdown" has received generally positive reviews from music critics. Angry Ape reviewer David Adair described the single as "a snappy and slightly abrasive number that will keep their new found fans amongst the Kerrang reading community, very happy". David Knight observed that "you won't hear a better riff on a dance track without a great amount of searching", but described the remixes released with the single as "absolutely terrible".

== Music video ==
Part of the Fight Club style fight scene taken from the "Showdown" music video.

The music video for "Showdown", directed by Nick Bartleet, was released on MyspaceTV on 12 December 2008 to promote Pendulum's upcoming single. It was originally intended to be Internet-only, but was subsequently A-listed on the television channel MTV Dance.

The video draws parallels from dog fighting, focusing on a fight scene in which the dogs are replaced by two young women, and culminates in the escape of one woman at the end of the video. It also depicts controversial scenes of women being kept in cages and men gambling on the outcome of fights, which contributed to Knight describing the video as "highly problematic". Some scenes of the video have been compared with the movie Fight Club by various sources, including Bartleet.

== Promotional video game ==
The "Showdown" video game.

On 24 December, shortly after the release of their music video, Pendulum presented a Space Invaders themed video game on their website to further promote "Showdown". By scoring more points, players who submitted their details could unlock more of the "Live at the Brixton Academy" version of "Showdown". They also had a chance of winning an official framed gold disc of In Silico.

The game was a modified version of Space Invaders, in which the aliens had been replaced with different coloured variants of the In Silico logo, and the bunkers were replaced with pairs of letters spelling out the band's name. Players had three lives to score as many points as possible, after which their score was logged on a high score table. The album version of "Showdown" was played during the game.

== Marketing and release ==
"Showdown" was first released on 5 January 2009 through various online music stores, including 7digital, Amazon.com, and iTunes. Along with the album version and radio edit of the song, the download bundle included a live recording and several remixes by other artists. The single was later released on a 12-inch picture disc, containing the album version and Excision remix of "Showdown", on 9 February by Warner Music UK.

The song "Showdown" was featured on In Silico as the opening track. It was the first single from the album not to use the In Silico logo prominently on its cover, although most of the logo can be seen on a bass drum in the cover art. Live versions of the song have appeared on iTunes Live: London Festival '08, as a B-side on "The Other Side", as well as in the single download bundle. It was also featured in the soundtrack of Disney Interactive Studios' off-road racing video game Pure. The track is also featured in the first trailer for Forza Motorsport 3, on the Xbox 360 as well as in the game itself during races, and CSI: NY episode "Green Piece". The song was featured for available in the soundtrack of Marvel's the Punisher: War Zone.

== Track listings ==
These are the major formats and associated track listings of single releases of "Showdown", written and produced by Rob Swire.

Music download
(released 5 January 2009)

1. "Showdown" – 5:27
2. "Showdown" (radio edit) – 3:22
3. "Showdown" (DJ Clipz remix) – 4:52
4. "Showdown" (Excision remix) – 4:47
5. "Showdown" (Redlight remix) – 5:09
6. "Showdown" (live at Brixton Academy) – 7:38

12-inch picture disc vinyl
(WEA454T; released 9 February 2009)

1. "Showdown" – 5:27
2. "Showdown" (Excision remix) – 4:47

== Personnel ==
"Showdown" is credited to:

Pendulum

- Rob Swire – writer, producer, vocals, mixing
- Gareth McGrillen – production assistant, bass guitar
- Peredur ap Gwynedd – guitar
- Paul Kodish – acoustic drums

Other contributors

- Simon Askew – mixing
- John Davis – mastering
- Paul West – logo design
- Hugh Pescod (DJ Clipz / Red Light) – remix
- Excision – remix

=== Video personnel ===
The music video for "Showdown" is credited to:

- Nick Bartleet – director, editor
- Phoebe Lloyd – producer
- Marko Fuchs – assistant director
- Eric Maddison – director of photography
- Zara Phythian – actor, lead martial artist
- Helen Bailey – actor, martial artist
- John Moule – video commissioner

== Release history ==
Region	Release date	Format	Catalogue
United Kingdom	5 January 2009	Download EP	None
United Kingdom	9 February 2009	12-inch single	WEA454T
