= AN21 =

Swedish DJ and record producer (born 1989)

- Born: Antoine Gabriel Michel Haydamous Josefsson; August 17, 1989 (age 36); Stockholm, Sweden
- Genres: Progressive house; electro house; tech house
- Occupations: Musician; DJ; record producer
- Instruments: Piano; guitar; synthesizer
- Years active: 2008–2016, 2022–present
- Label: Size Records
- Website: an21.com

Antoine Gabriel Michel Haydamous Josefsson (born August 17, 1989), known professionally as AN21, is a Greek-Swedish DJ and record producer. In DJ Magazine's polls of the top 100 DJs, he was ranked number 85 in 2011 and number 61 in 2012. AN21 has collaborated with Max Vangeli and signed on his brother's label, Size Records.

== Career ==
AN21 was nominated for "DJ Revelation" in the International Dance Music Awards (IDMAs). He appeared as a DJ in several major festivals including Pacha Ibiza, Ministry of Sound in London, Avalon in Los Angeles, Zouk in Singapore, Global Gathering, and Mysteryland.

In 2011, AN21 assembled the compilation "People Of The Night", which was released for free with issue 497 of DJ Magazine. It collects works of Steve Angello, Dirty South, Swanky Tunes and others. On September 3, 2011, AN21 released the album People Of The Night in collaboration with Max Vangeli on Size Records. The album contains 15 tracks and includes collaborations with Steve Angello, Michael Woods, Tiësto, Congorock, Kim Fai and Moguai, and vocalists Example and Julie McKnight.

== Personal life ==
He is the younger brother of Steve Angello, a producer and member of Swedish House Mafia.

== Discography ==
=== Studio albums ===
- 2012: People Of The Night (with Max Vangeli) (Size Records)

=== Singles ===
- 2009: "Flonko" (with Steve Angello)
- 2009: "Valodja" (with Steve Angello)
- 2010: "Gama" (feat. Max Vangeli) (Size Records)
- 2010: "Swedish Beauty" (featuring Max Vangeli) (Size Records)
- 2010: "Swing 'n' Swoosh" (with Steve Angello)
- 2011: "Whisper" (featuring Max Vangeli and Example)
- 2011: "This Far" (featuring Max Vangeli and Rudy)
- 2012: "H8RS" (AN21 and Max Vangeli vs. Steve Angello) (Size Records)
- 2012: "People Of The Night" (AN21, Max Vangeli and Tiësto featuring Lover Lover) (Size Records)
- 2012: "Bombs Over Capitals" (AN21 and Max Vangeli featuring Julie McKnight) (Size Records)
- 2014: "Rebel" (AN21, Dimitri Vangelis and Wyman) (Size Records)
- 2014: "GODS" (S-A vs. AN21 and Sebjak) (Size Records)
- 2014: "Tonight" (featuring Max Vangeli) (Size Records)
- 2015: "Everything" (featuring Sebjak) (Size Records)
- 2015: "Last Dance" (with Steve Angello) (Size Records)
- 2015: "Louder" (with Matt Nash) (Size Records)
- 2022: "Alright" (with Hiisak featuring Able Faces) (Size Records)
- 2022: "No Tomorrow" (with Maunt) (Size Records)
- 2023: "Love's Not Over" (with Silhouette and Kuaigon) (Size Records)
- 2026: "Run" (with Pretty Output) (Size Records)

=== Remixes ===
- 2009:
  - Basement Jaxx – "Raindrops" (AN21 and Philip Jensen Remix)
  - Tommy Sparks – "Miracle" (AN21 and Philip Jensen Remix)
  - Juan Kidd and Mr. Pedros – "Bang the Drum" (AN21 and Sebjak Remix)
  - Steve Angello – "Monday" (AN21 and Max Vangeli Remix)
- 2010:
  - Ellie Goulding – "Starry Eyed" (AN21 and Max Vangeli Remix)
  - La Roux – "Quicksand" (AN21 and Philip Jensen Remix)
  - Jus Jack – "That Sound" (Max Vangeli and AN21 Extended Club Mix)
  - The Prodigy – "Smack My Bitch Up" (AN21 and Max Vangeli Remix)
  - Eddie Thoneick and Erick Morillo (featuring Shena) – "Nothing Better" (AN21 and Max Vangeli Remix)
  - Switchfoot – "Always" (Max Vangeli and AN21 Remix)
  - Gorillaz – "On Melancholy Hill" (AN21 and Max Vangeli Remix)
  - Pendulum – "The Island" (Steve Angello, AN21 and Max Vangeli Remix)
- 2011:
  - Swedish House Mafia – "Save the World" (AN21 and Max Vangeli Remix)
- 2013:
  - AN21 and Max Vangeli featuring Bnann – "Glow" (AN21 and Max Vangeli and Promise Land Remix)
- 2014:
  - Steve Angello and Dougy from The Temper Trap – "Wasted Love" (AN21 and Sebjak remix)
- 2015:
  - Susanne Sundfør – "Kamikaze" (Steve Angello and AN21 Remix)
- 2018:
  - Pendulum - The Island, Part 1 (Dawn) (AN21 Remix)
