= In Silico (Pendulum album) =

Studio album by Pendulum
- Released: 12 May 2008
- Recorded: 2007–2008
- Genre: Drum and bass; electronic rock; alternative dance
- Length: 57:55
- Label: Earstorm; Warner Bros.; Atlantic
- Producer: Rob Swire; Gareth McGrillen

Pendulum chronology
| Hold Your Colour (2005) | In Silico (2008) | Live at Brixton Academy (2009) |

Alternative casing
- Special edition embossed tin

Singles from In Silico
- 1. "Granite" Released: 26 November 2007; 2. "Propane Nightmares" Released: 14 April 2008; 3. "The Other Side" Released: 28 July 2008; 4. "Showdown" Released: 5 January 2009

In Silico is the second studio album by the Australian drum and bass band Pendulum, released in Australia and Europe on 12 May 2008 by Warner Bros. Records and in the United States a day later by Atlantic Records. The album represents a change in sound for the band from their debut album Hold Your Colour away from drum and bass, incorporating more rock and electronic influences. The album peaked at number 2 on the UK Albums Chart on 18 May 2008. Singles from the album include "Granite", "Propane Nightmares", "The Other Side" and "Showdown". Mini discs of the song "The Tempest" were thrown out to the audience of the "Project Rev" live show.

The expression "in silico", from which the album's title is derived, means performed on computer or via computer simulation. However group member Gareth McGrillen also commented on the way it plays upon Nirvana's well-known album title In Utero (which means born naturally or of the uterus) and thus carries extra shades of meaning related to being "born synthetically", thus explaining the album's cover design of a baby or fetus displayed inside a circular design representing a synthetic ovum.

== Reception ==
Professional ratings
Review scores
| Source | Rating |
|---|---|
| AllMusic | 4/5 stars |
| Digital Spy | 3/5 stars |
| The Guardian | 3/5 stars |
| Resident Advisor | 1/5 |

Critical reception to the album was mixed, with most of the polarisation coming from Pendulum's shift from drum and bass to a more rock and pop-imbued electronic sound. AllMusic praised that "Pendulum is determined to heal the breach" between rock and electronica; however, The Guardian felt that the sound was "a little dated". Some fans of the first album criticised In Silico for the change of genre; however, because of the album's popularity, and with singles being played on television music channels such as Kerrang!, Pendulum managed to attract a new group of fans. Q named both lead single "Granite" and "Propane Nightmares" in the top 50 songs of the months in which they were released.

== In popular culture ==
The songs "Granite" and "Showdown" are featured in the off-road video game Pure. "Showdown" appears in the racing video game Forza Motorsport 3. "Granite", "9,000 Miles" and "The Tempest" are also featured in the video game Need for Speed: Undercover. "Showdown" also appears in the 2008 film Punisher: War Zone in addition to an episode of CSI: NY. Also, part of the song "Mutiny" appears in a Verizon Wireless commercial promoting the LG Dare, and "The Other Side" appears in an episode of EastEnders aired on 6 August 2010. The song "Propane Nightmares" was also used as the main theme for the WWE Pay-per view Cyber Sunday 2008 special and on the release trailer of Just Cause 2. Plus, a remixed version of "Propane Nightmares" by Celldweller appears on the PlayStation 2 and PlayStation Portable videogame MotorStorm: Arctic Edge. "The Tempest" also appeared in TV spots for the film Ninja Assassin.

== Track listing ==
Original release
| No. | Title | Length |
|---|---|---|
| 1. | "Showdown" | 5:27 |
| 2. | "Different" | 5:51 |
| 3. | "Propane Nightmares" | 5:13 |
| 4. | "Visions" | 5:36 |
| 5. | "Midnight Runner" | 6:55 |
| 6. | "The Other Side" | 5:15 |
| 7. | "Mutiny" | 5:09 |
| 8. | "9,000 Miles" | 6:26 |
| 9. | "Granite" | 4:41 |
| 10. | "The Tempest" | 7:27 |
| Total length: | | 57:55 |

Special edition
| No. | Title | Length |
|---|---|---|
| 11. | "Propane Nightmares" (VIP remix) | 5:22 |
| 12. | "Propane Nightmares" (Celldweller remix) | 5:34 |
| 13. | "Propane Nightmares" (radio edit music video) | 4:29 |
| 14. | "Granite" (live video from electric ballroom) | 4:32 |
| Total length: | | 68:48 |

Bonus tracks version (iTunes)
| No. | Title | Length |
|---|---|---|
| 11. | "Propane Nightmares" (VIP remix) | 5:22 |
| 12. | "Propane Nightmares" (Celldweller remix) | 5:34 |
| 13. | "Propane Nightmares" (VST remix) | 4:48 |
| 14. | "Granite" (music video) | 3:41 |
| 15. | "Propane Nightmares" (music video) | 5:20 |
| 16. | "In Silico Showcase" | 5:24 |
| Total length: | | 90:04 |

In Silico EP (Vinyl)
| No. | Title | Side | Length |
|---|---|---|---|
| 1. | "Showdown" | A | 5:27 |
| 2. | "Visions" | B | 5:36 |
| 3. | "Midnight Runner" | C | 6:55 |
| 4. | "9,000 Miles" | D | 6:26 |
| Total length: | | | 24:24 |

=== March mini-mix release ===
On 26 March 2008, Pendulum released a 12-minute mini-mix of the album – known as In Silico (El-Hornet Mini-Mix) – available only to those who are registered on their website. The track listing is as follows:

1. "Showdown"
2. "Granite"
3. "Granite" (Dillinja remix)
4. "Granite" (Breakfastaz remix)
5. "Visions"
6. "The Other Side"
7. "Propane Nightmares" (VST remix)
8. "Different"
9. "Mutiny"
10. "Propane Nightmares"
11. "Propane Nightmares" (VIP remix)
12. "Propane Nightmares" (Celldweller remix)
13. "Midnight Runner"
14. "9000 Miles"
15. "The Tempest"

== Samples ==
- The track "Showdown" uses a sample from "Jungle Boogie" by Kool & the Gang.
- The track "Propane Nightmares" uses samples from "Million Miles From Home" by Dune.
- The track "Mutiny" uses a modified vocal sample from Pendulum's own "The Terminal" (from Hold Your Colour), as well as Public Enemy's 1991 single "Shut 'Em Down".

== Personnel ==
Pendulum

- Rob Swire – vocals, synthesisers
- Gareth McGrillen – bass guitar
- Paul Harding – turntables, samples
- Peredur ap Gwynedd – guitar
- Paul Kodish – drums

Additional personnel

- Andy Greenwood – trumpet on "Propane Nightmares"
- Craig Wild – trumpet on "Propane Nightmares"
- Andy Wood – trombone on "Propane Nightmares"
- Christopher Mayhew – talkbox vocals on "The Other Side"

== Charts ==
=== Weekly charts ===
| Chart (2008) | Peak position |
|---|---|
| Australian Albums (ARIA) | 9 |
| New Zealand Albums (RMNZ) | 21 |
| UK Albums (OCC) | 2 |
| UK Dance Albums (OCC) | 1 |
| US Top Dance Albums (Billboard) | 16 |
| US Heatseekers Albums (Billboard) | 50 |

=== Year-end charts ===
| Chart (2008) | Position |
|---|---|
| UK Albums (OCC) | 73 |
| Chart (2009) | Position |
| UK Albums (OCC) | 168 |

== Certifications ==
| Region | Certification | Certified units/sales |
|---|---|---|
| United Kingdom (BPI) | Platinum | 300,000^{^} |
^{^} Shipments figures based on certification alone.

== Release history ==
| Country | Release date |
|---|---|
| Europe | 12 May 2008 |
| United States | 13 May 2008 |
