= The Other Side (Pendulum song) =

Single by Pendulum

from the album In Silico
- Released: 28 July 2008 (UK)
- Recorded: 2007–2008
- Genre: Breakbeat; electronic rock
- Length: 5:15 (album version); 3:41 (radio edit)
- Label: Warner Music UK
- Songwriter: Rob Swire
- Producers: Rob Swire; Gareth McGrillen

Pendulum singles chronology
"Propane Nightmares" (2008)	"The Other Side" (2008)	"Showdown" (2009)

Audio sample
- "The Other Side": file; help

"The Other Side" is a song by Australian drum and bass band Pendulum, released as the third single from their second album, "In Silico". It was released on 28 July 2008 to coincide with their iTunes Festival gig at London's KOKO. The song peaked at number 54 in the UK Singles Chart on 3 August, one week after it was first released.

== Critical reception ==
"The Other Side" received mixed reviews. Simon Reynolds, of Digital Spy, said in his review that the song "continues their switch to a more mainstream, 'chartable' sound", and that it "seems far too cluttered, noisy and confused to become a chart hit". He went on to say it "is percussive and clearly designed to get dance floors moving, but outside of that context it's little more than a boisterous, unwanted assault on the ear drums".

While reviewing the album In Silico, DJ Gregsta put "The Other Side" in a more positive light, describing it as an "excellent vocal track". He also went further to say that "this is, in my opinion, one of the standout tracks on the album and although unlikely to strike a chord with the media, I still believe its one of the best on the album". The track also received a fairly neutral review from Aidan Williamson in his review of In Silico for Strangeglue, who described the track as "quite odd... but cleverly constructed" and noted that it "squanders the interesting intro with an unimposing mid section".

== Music video ==
The Pendulum logo depicted in the vent of a volcano in the music video for "The Other Side".

A music video was produced for "The Other Side" by the motion design studio Bon-Bon, directed by Rob Chandler. It primarily depicts a man travelling in an elevator, stopping at several locations throughout the video. The video was initially released on 8 July 2008 exclusively through the BBC Radio 1 website. It was later uploaded to YouTube and various other websites for use on the band's Myspace page and official website.

During the video, a holographic projection in the elevator appears to communicate with the man using some of the lyrics in the song. It features several instances of the band's logo, which has also been used for the cover art of In Silico and three of the singles taken from it. In particular the video features a UFO closely resembling the logo, which featured in the video for the band's earlier single "Granite". Parts of the video bear some resemblance to various scenes in the film 2001: A Space Odyssey.

The man in the music video is Scott Ryan Vickers.

== Track listing ==
12-inch vinyl single
(WEA450T; released 28 July 2008)

A1. "The Other Side" (VIP mix) – 5:38
A2. "The Other Side" (dubstep mix) – 4:46

CD single
(WEA450CD; released 28 July 2008)

1. "The Other Side" (album version) – 5:15
2. "The Other Side" (radio edit) – 3:41
3. "The Other Side" (VIP mix) – 5:38
4. "The Other Side" (dubstep mix) – 4:46

Digital EP
(iTunes Store, 7digital; released 7 July 2008)

1. "The Other Side" (album version) – 5:15
2. "The Other Side" (radio edit) – 3:41
3. "The Other Side" (VIP mix) – 5:38
4. "The Other Side" (dubstep mix) – 4:46
5. "Showdown" (live at Brixton Academy) – 7:39

== Personnel ==
The following people contributed to "The Other Side".

- Rob Swire – synthesiser, mixing
- Gareth McGrillen – bass guitar
- Peredur ap Gwynedd – guitar
- Paul Kodish – drums
- Christopher Mayhew – talkbox vocals
- Simon Askew – mixing
- John Davis – mastering

=== Video personnel ===
The following people contributed to the music video for "The Other Side".

- Rob Chandler – director, editor, visual effects
- Sam Brown – producer, director of photography
- Paul Richman – producer
- Clayton McDermott – visual effects
- Annelise (Annie) Levy – makeup artist
- Justin Atkinson – matte painter
- Scott Ryan Vickers – actor

== Charts ==
Chart (2008)	Peak position
UK Singles Chart	54
