= Ransom (Pendulum song) =

Single by Pendulum
- Released: 6 April 2011
- Recorded: 2009–2011
- Genre: Drum and bass
- Length: 5:54
- Label: Warner Music UK; Earstorm
- Songwriter(s): Rob Swire

Pendulum singles chronology
"Crush" (2011)	"Ransom" (2011)	"Driver/Nothing For Free" (2020)

"Ransom" is a song by Australian drum and bass band Pendulum. It was released as a charity digital download single from the official Pendulum website with 100% of proceeds from the sale going to two charities, The Red Cross and Doctors Without Borders (MSF) who did work in Japan following the 2011 earthquake and tsunami there. It peaked at number 193 on the UK Singles Chart.

== Background ==
"Ransom" was released as a charity single with all the proceeds from the single going to The Red Cross and Doctors Without Borders (MSF). Rob Swire talked about the song by saying, "As you may or may not know, we excluded a number of tracks from the final version of ‘Immersion’. One in particular caused considerable outcry amongst fans, a little track called ‘Ransom’ that we made for Miami WMC 2009. It was omitted from the album because we didn't think it fit, and we were waiting for a good enough reason to let people have it. Given the recent tragic events in Japan, we thought it would be a good idea to finally make it available on our website and donate the proceeds to charities which we feel have the best chance of helping out. We don't make anything, the label doesn’t make anything – 100% of the proceeds will be divided equally between the Red Cross and Doctors Without Borders (MSF)". Since Summer 2011 Ransom has been the intro for Pendulum's live shows.

== Track listing ==
Digital download
No.	Title	Length
1.	"Ransom"	5:54

== Charts ==
Chart (2011)	Peak position
UK Singles (The Official Charts Company)	193
