= Emalkay =

English dubstep producer and DJ

- Born: Martin Knowles; Birmingham, England
- Genres: Dubstep, Drum and Bass
- Occupations: Producer, DJ
- Years active: 2005–present
- Labels: Dub Police, Morphic Sounds, Boka, Storming Productions
- Website: facebook.com/emalkayofficial

Martin Knowles, better known by his stage name Emalkay, is an English dubstep producer and DJ from Birmingham. He is best known for his 2009 single "When I Look at You", described by Clash as a "monster", which was released on Caspa's Dub Police label. Emalkay released his debut album, Eclipse, in May 2011. Knowles describes his sound as '[...] a mixture of the usual dubstep tropes coupled with what I imagine Sean Pertwee's face sounds like when he is making all those terrible, grimacing expressions in the film Dog Soldiers.'
