= Paul Kodish =

- Born: 2 January 1965 (age 61); Willesden, London, England
- Genres: Drum and bass, electronic rock, electronica
- Occupation: Musician
- Instrument: Drums
- Years active: 1986–present
- Website: www.kodishlive.com

Paul Kodish (born 2 January 1965) is an English musician and professional drummer, raised in Willesden, London. Kodish has performed with a variety of different artists, including the hip hop act Whodini in 1986, and the drum and bass group Bad Company. He was also one of two drummers for the electronica band Apollo 440 between 1997 and 2005 and the drummer in the Australian-British drum and bass band Pendulum between 2006 and 2009. Kodish spent a short time in 2010 drumming with the Liverpool band Killaflaw, performing at several concerts and drumming for their debut album Sleaze and Grit. He currently supports DJ Fresh's crew on their FRESH/Live tour.

== Biography ==
=== Early career: 1986–1996 ===
Kodish grew up in Willesden, London. He learned to play the drums at an early age and was heavily influenced by drummers including Billy Cobham, Steve Gadd and Stewart Copeland. His earliest professional gig was with Brooklyn hip hop act Whodini, as the drummer on their 1986 studio album Back in Black. Over the next ten years, he played and performed with a variety of different artists, including Eye to Eye, London-based acid house pioneers T-Funk, Phunk Lawds, Lizzie Tear, The Franks, Skunk Anansie, Jean Michel Jarre, mrTimothy and IBEX. Moving to fusion, Paul soon became familiar with the London drum and bass scene.

=== Apollo 440: 1996–2005 ===
In 1996, Kodish formed the jungle-surf fusion band Maximum Roach with Noko of Apollo 440 and Ian "Mary Byker" Hoxley, former lead singer of Gaye Bykers on Acid. He then joined Apollo 440 with Mary and Harry K in 1997, as their second drummer. Kodish toured extensively with Apollo 440 that year, and they were invited to support U2 in Israel.

During his time with them, he appeared on two albums, Gettin' High on Your Own Supply and Dude Descending a Staircase. Two years later, after many lineup changes, Noko left Maximum Roach and was replaced by Peredur ap Gwynedd, who eventually joined Pendulum with Kodish. Noko then reunited with Maximum Roach in 2005 to record new material, which was never released. In one interview, Kodish called Maximum Roach and Apollo 440 the best bands he'd ever played in and said would die happy with those memories. Kodish is currently playing with DJ Fresh, who was introduced to Kodish by Howard Grey from Apollo 440. Kodish is currently back playing with the original Apollo 440 line up.

=== Pendulum: 2005–2009 ===
Prior to leaving Apollo 440, Kodish had joined the drum and bass group Bad Company as part of their live band. Although he did not remain with them for long, he did become friends with Dan Stein, better known as Fresh, who went on to produce several songs with Pendulum. In 2005, Kodish met the lead singer and producer of Pendulum, Rob Swire, to whom he suggested trying to play tracks from the band's debut album, Hold Your Colour, in live performance. Soon after, he joined the band as their first live drummer, and went on to perform on the band's second studio album, In Silico. Kodish toured extensively with Pendulum between 2006 and 2009 In 2010, it was announced that Kodish was no longer a member of the band. After a short stint with Liverpool electronica group Killaflaw, he reunited with DJ Fresh and his Fresh/live Project.

== Musical equipment ==
Kodish plays a customised drum kit including Gretsch drums and Zildjian cymbals. He has also used drum triggers and pads, and various other percussion instruments including bells and a 30-inch gong.

Zildjian cymbals:

- 6" A Custom splash
- 12" A Custom splash
- 13" A Custom Mastersound hi-hat
- 17" A Custom fast crash
- 18" A Custom fast crash
- 20" A Custom sizzle ride with 6 rivets
- 13.25" K Custom Hybrid hi-hat
- 20" K Custom Hybrid ride
- 9.5" Zil-Bel effect
- 14" ZXT Trashformer effect

Gretsch usa Maple drums:

- 10x8" mounted tom
- 12x9" mounted tom
- 14x5" snare drum
- 14x6.5" snare drum
- 14x14" floor tom
- 16x16" floor tom
- 18x16" floor tom
- 22x18" bass drum

Spaun custom Acrylic 22x17 BD 10X7 RACK 15X13 FLOOR 16X15 FLOOR

PORK PIE BRASS SHELLS 12X6 13X6 10X6 LUDWIG 402 SLINGERLAND COB 14X 6.5 DW HARDWARE PEDALS

Other equipment:

- Clavia Nord DDrum4
- ddrum acoustic trigger pads
- ddrum electronic drums

Various Roland td's muse receptors Fat kat pedals

- 30" gong
- various bells

== Discography ==
Albums with Whodini:

- Back in Black (1986, Jive)

Albums with Apollo 440:

- Gettin' High on Your Own Supply (1999, Sony Music Entertainment)
- Dude Descending a Staircase (2003, Sony Music Entertainment)

Albums with Pendulum:

- In Silico (2008, Warner Music Group)

Singles with Pendulum:

- "Granite" (2007, Warner Music UK)
- "Propane Nightmares" (2008, Warner Music UK)
- "The Other Side" (2008, Warner Music UK)
- "Showdown" (2009, Warner Music UK)
