= Max Vangeli =

Moldavian DJ (born 1985)

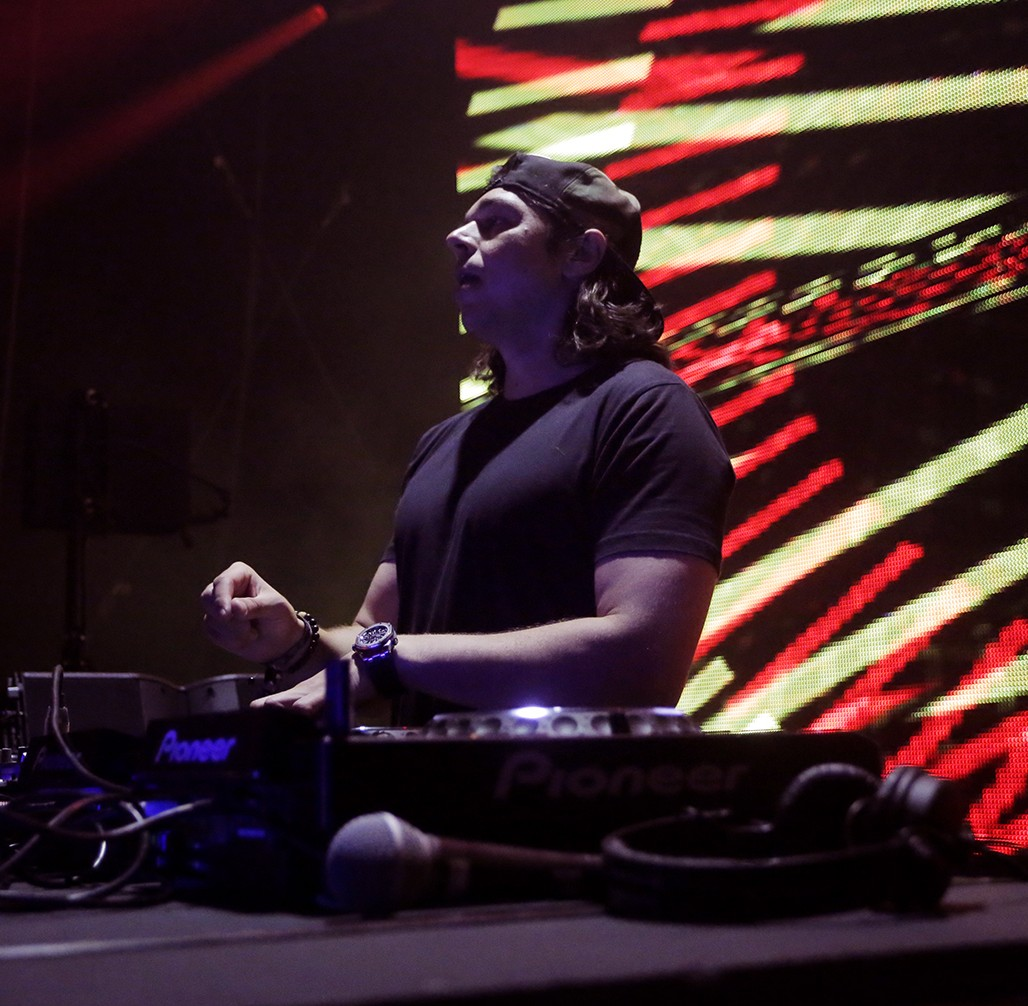
- Max Vangeli in New York, 2014

Background information
- Born: Maksim Vangeli; 4 August 1985 (age 41); Căușeni, Moldavian SSR, USSR
- Origin: San Francisco, California, United States
- Genres: House, electro house, tech house
- Occupations: DJ, record producer
- Instruments: music sequencer, personal computer, synthesizers, piano
- Years active: 2008-present
- Labels: Size Records, NoFace Records, Armada Music
- Website: www.maxvangeli.com

Maksim "Max" Vangeli (born 4 August 1985) is a Moldovan DJ and record producer based in San Francisco, United States.

Vangeli is best known for his house music productions and collaboration with Swedish DJ and record producer Antoine Josefsson, better known as AN21. The duo is popularly known as AN21 and Max Vangeli.

== Biography ==
Max Vangeli was born on 4 August 1985, and raised in Moldova until in his teens, when he moved to the United States.

== Musical career ==
=== 2008–2011: Career beginnings and early success ===
In 2008, Max Vangeli released his debut EP entitled Crazed EP via Rising Trax. In 2009, Vangeli released the singles, "Aqua Kai," "Exit", "Fender Bender," and "Your Love", which featured Digital Lab and Simone Denny. On 9 December, Max Vangeli made his debut on Steve Angello's record label, Size Records, alongside Swedish DJ, AN21 with the single, "Gama".

In 2010, Max Vangeli released his second collaboration with AN21 entitled "Swedish Beauty", via Refune Music. The song was named an "Essential New Tune" by Pete Tong of BBC Radio 1. Soon after, Max Vangeli and AN21 collaborated again for the release of their remix of Ellie Goulding's single, "Starry Eyed." The remix was released as a free download on 23 March. On 14 June, Max Vangeli released the single, "Look Into Your Heart", via the record label, U-BOOT. Two days later, on 16 June, Vangeli released his collaboration with Max C entitled, "Let It Rain", via PBR Recordings. Alongside Steve Angello and AN21, Vangeli remixed "The Island" for the Australian band Pendulum. The record was dubbed the 'hottest track in the world' on the radio program of Zane Lowe for BBC Radio 1, and reached Number 3 in the global sales Beatport chart, once released in November. During the year, Vangeli performed at international festivals including Creamfields in the UK and Mysteryland in Amsterdam; as well as mega-clubs such as Cocoon in Frankfurt, Avalon in Los Angeles and Mansion in Miami, Florida. Later that year, he was named as one of the DJ Mag’s "Top 5 DJs to watch in 2011".

In 2011, Max Vangeli was named as MTV's, "destined to be one of the most promising artists of the year 2011 ". On 15 February, Vangeli and AN21's remix of "Starry Eyed" was officially released and featured on the official remix EP of the following track. Throughout the year, Vangeli focused on live endeavours and marked frequent slots at Pacha Ibiza for the Masquerade Motel alongside Swedish supergroup Swedish House Mafia, as well as spots at Sensation White.

=== 2012–2015: Career with AN21, Size Records and other projects ===
In 2012, Max Vangeli released his debut studio album with AN21, entitled, "People Of the Night," which was released on the Size Records label. The album featured a series of collaborations, those of which included the DJs: Congorock, Kim Fai, Michael Woods, Moguai, Steve Angello and Tiësto; and the vocalists: Bnann, Example, Julie McKnight, Rudy and Sadapa. The album was also home to the singles: "H8RS," (with Steve Angello), "Bombs Over Capitals," featuring Julie McKnight, "Lost," with Congorock, "Glow," featuring Bnann and the album's title track with Tiësto. Most of Vangeli's tours that year were with his partner AN21 and Steve Angello. In 2013, Max Vangeli launched a weekly podcast and radio show called, "CODE RADIO", which is syndicated in 35 countries.

In 2014, Vangeli collaborated with his childhood friend Danny Ray to release the single "Grim" on Size Records. Later on, Vangeli released a vocal record called, "Last Night Changed It All," also through Size Records on 31 March. it charted in the Top 25 of the iTunes dance chart. On 9 July, Vangeli released his second collaborative effort with Danny Ray titled, "Bang the Drums," via Size Records as a free download. On 27 October, Vangeli released his track with Adrien Mezsi called, "DNCE," exclusively via Spotify. The track was released by Size Records. On 1 December, Vangeli and AN21 collaborated once again for the release of the vocal single, "Tonight," via Size Records. Corey James and Will K released a remix of the following track as a free download via Size Records later on.

In January 2015, Max Vangeli announced on Facebook that he planned to start his own music label. He then released the vocal single, "You And Me," via Size Records on 25 January. Soon after, Max Vangeli released the single, "Skin," with Flatdisk via Sosumi Records, being the first release by Vangeli to not be with Size Records since 2012. On 29 October, Vangeli released the song, "Say My Name," as a free download exclusively through his SoundCloud account.

=== 2016–present: New music and NoFace Records ===
In January 2016, Max Vangeli collaborated with Armada Music and launched his record label, NoFace Records. On 11 January, he released the label's first single, "Shine," featuring Frances Marvel and Kacie Marie. On 22 February, Max Vangeli released NoFace Records' second track, "Blow This Club," in collaboration with Flatdisk. On 2 May, Vangeli released his third single with NoFace Records titled, "Stay Out," featuring Connor Foley. On 2 June, Max Vangeli released the single, "Get High" as a free download via his record label, NoFace Records. He then released the single, "Feel the Music" with De KiBo on 1 August, also via NoFace Records. On 19 September, Vangeli released the single, "Why Do I," featuring Mackenzie Thoms, via NoFace Records.

== NoFace Records ==
In January 2016, Max Vangeli collaborated with Armada Music and launched his record label NoFace Records.

On September 9, 2019, Vangeli rebooted his label "NoFace Records" and released his new single Golden Rings, featuring Sergio Echenique & Snenie.

On July 24, 2019, Vangeli signed Mawsua to NoFace Records and "Rapt", was released in September 20, 2019 through the label. The label then released a promotional video welcoming the new artist.

=== Singles ===
Title	Artist(s)	Date	Catalogue
"Shine"	Max Vangeli (featuring Frances Marvel and Kacie Marie)	11 January 2016	NFR001
"Blow This Club"	Max Vangeli and Flatdisk	22 February 2016	NFR002
"Shine" (Max Vangeli VIP Mix)	Max Vangeli (featuring Francis Marvel and Kacie Marie)	14 March 2016	NFR001V
"Stay Out"	Max Vangeli (featuring Connor Foley)	2 May 2016	NFR003
"Get High"	Max Vangeli	2 June 2016	none
"Feel the Music"	Max Vangeli and De KiBo	1 August 2016	NFR005
"Set the World (On the Fire)"	Flatdisk (featuring Bitter's Kiss)	22 August 2016	NFR004
"Why Do I"	Max Vangeli (featuring Mackenzie Thoms)	19 September 2016	NFR006
"Just Freakin"	Max Vangeli	28 September 2018	NFR019
"4EVER"	Max Vangeli (featuring Blender)	8 March 2018	NFR021S
"I Don't Wanna Say Goodbye"	Max Vangeli	26 July 2018	NFR020DJ
"Golden Rings featuring Sergio Echenique & Snenie"	Max Vangeli (featuring Sergio Echenique & Snenie)	6 September 2019	NFR022
"Rapt"	Mawsua	20 September 2019	NFR023
"Don't Worry About Me"	Chris Burke	20 May 2021	NFR252

== Discography ==
=== Singles ===
Title	Year	Album
"iRock" (with Digital Lab)	2008	Crazed EP
"KEJI" (with Digital Lab)	2008	Crazed EP
"Crazed" (with Digital Lab)	2008	Crazed EP
"Aqua Kai" (with Digital Lab)	2009	Non-album singles
"Exit" (with Sonic C and Digital Lab)	2009	Non-album singles
"Fender Bender" (with Stonebridge)	2009	Non-album singles
"Your Love" (with Digital Lab featuring Simone Denny)	2009	Non-album singles
"Swedish Beauty" (with AN21)	2010	Non-album singles
"Gama" (with AN21)	2010	Non-album singles
"Look Into Your Heart" (featuring Max C)	2010	Non-album singles
"Let It Rain" (featuring Simone Denny)	2010	Non-album singles
"Diamond Life" (featuring Julie Mcknight)	2010	Non-album singles
"Bombs Over Capitals" (with AN21 featuring Julie McKnight)	2012	People of the Night
"Glow" (with AN21 featuring Bnann)	2012	People of the Night
"H8rs" (with AN21 vs. Steve Angello)	2012	People of the Night
"Lost" (with AN21 and Congorock)	2012	People of the Night
"People of the Night" (with AN21 vs. Tiësto featuring Lover Lover)	2012	People of the Night
"Grim" (with Danny Ray)	2014	Non-album singles
"Last Night Changed It All"	2014	Non-album singles
"Bang the Drums" (with Danny Ray)	2014	Non-album singles
"DNCE" (with Adrien Mezsi)	2014	Non-album singles
"Tonight" (with AN21)	2014	Non-album singles
"You & Me"	2015	Non-album singles
"Skin" (with Flatdisk)	2015	Non-album singles
"Say My Name"	2015	Non-album singles
"Shine" (featuring Francis Marvel and Kacie Marie)	2016	Non-album singles
"Blow This Club" (with Flatdisk)	2016	Non-album singles
"Stay Out" (featuring Connor Foley)	2016	Non-album singles
"Get High"	2016	Non-album singles
"Feel the Music" (with De KiBo)	2016	Non-album singles
"Why Do I" (featuring Mackenzie Thoms)	2016	Non-album singles
"Top Of My Lungs" (with Databoy)	2017	Non-album singles
"Save Myself" (featuring Adrian Delgado)	2017	Non-album singles
"Roads"	2017	Roads EP
"Sonar"	2017	Roads EP
"Game Changer"	2017	Roads EP
"Heavy Love" (with Andrew Rayel featuring Kye Sones)	2017	Moments
"Made For Lovin' You" (featuring Danny Ray)	2017	Non-album singles
"Ground Shake" (with Drop Department)	2018	Non-album singles
"Booty Shake" (with Timmy Trumpet)	2018	Non-album singles
"Just Freakin"	2018	Non-album singles
"I Don't Wanna Say Goodbye"	2019	Non-album singles
"Rapt" (with Mawsua)	2019	Non-album singles
"Golden Rings" (featuring Sergio Echenique and Snenie)|	2019	Non-album singles
"What's Love Got to Do With It" (featuring Agatha)	2019	

== Remixes and mashups ==
=== With AN21 ===
Year	Title	Artist(s)
2009	"Monday"	Steve Angello
2010	"Starry Eyed"	Ellie Goulding
2010	"Always"	Switchfoot
2010	"The Island" (Steve Angello, AN21 and Max Vangeli Remix)	Pendulum
2010	"Nothing Better"	Erick Morillo and Eddie Thoneick
2010	"On Melancholy Hill"	Gorillaz
2010	"Smack My Bit** Up 2010"	The Prodigy
2010	"That Sound"	Jus Jack
2011	"Save the World"	Swedish House Mafia (featuring John Martin)
2013	"Glow" (AN21 and Max Vangeli and Promise Land Remix)	AN21 and Max Vangeli (featuring Bnann)

=== As a solo artist ===
Year	Title	Artist(s)
2008	"Whop" (Max Vangeli and Digital Lab Remix)	Mark Trophy
2009	"Move For Me" (Max Vangeli, Digital Lab and Sonic C Vocal Mix)	Kaskade and deadmau5
2009	"Finally Found"	Late Night Alumni
2010	"One Beat Away"	Cicada
2016	"Shine" (Max Vangeli VIP Mix)	Max Vangeli (featuring Francis Marvel and Kacie Marie)
2016	"Feel the Music" (Max Vangeli PB&J Edit)	Max Vangeli and De Kibo

=== Mashups ===
Year	Title	Artist(s)
2016	"No Money to Get High"	Galantis vs. Max Vangeli
2016	"Light It Up Intoxicated"	Major Lazer featuring Nyla and Fuse ODG vs. Martin Solveig and GTA
2016	"Fugees Blow This Club"	ID vs. Max Vangeli and Flatdisk
