= Chuckie (DJ) =

Surinamese musician (born 1978)

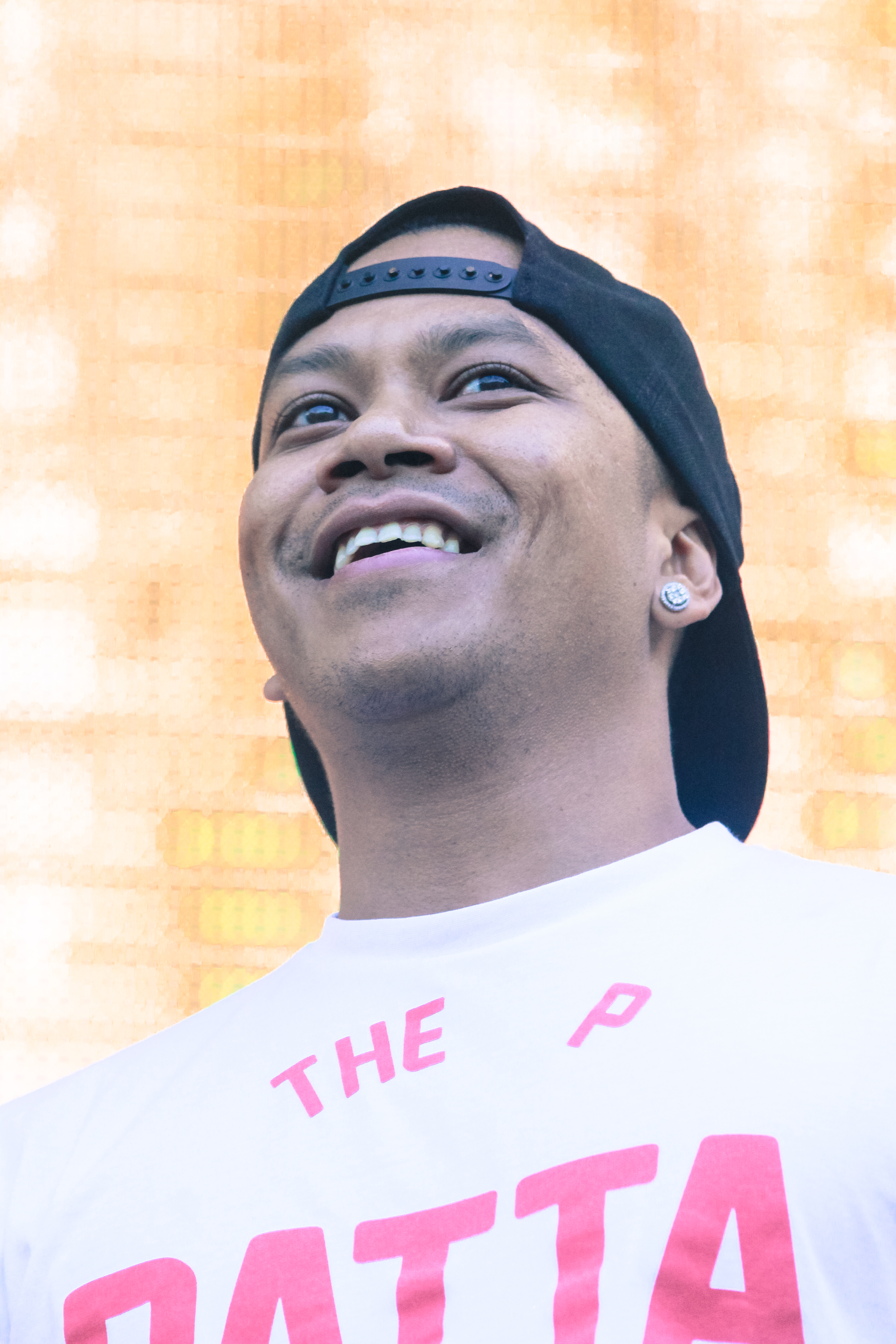
- Chuckie in 2013

Background information
- Also known as: DJ Chuckie
- Born: Clyde Sergio Narain; 25 June 1978 (age 47); Paramaribo, Suriname
- Origin: Paramaribo, Suriname
- Genres: Trance house, Dutch house, EDM, trap, moombahton, progressive trance
- Occupations: DJ, producer, rapper
- Instrument: Ableton
- Years active: 1993–present
- Labels: Dirty Dutch Music, Smash The House, DOORN Records (SPINNIN'), Armada Trice, Cr2
- Website: http://www.djchuckie.com/

Clyde Sergio Narain (born 25 June 1978), known professionally as Chuckie, is a Surinamese DJ, rapper and producer.

Chuckie was born in Paramaribo, Suriname. He is a producer of what has been called the "dirty trance" scene, a cultural movement centered on lively urban club events featuring dancing, bright lights and interactive stage elements. He has also helped develop a style of music known as "Dirty trance", a genre characterized by high pitched lead synths over Latin-inspired rhythms and samples.

Hits including "Let the Bass Kick", "Aftershock" and "Make Some Noise" (with Junxterjack) have contributed to his success. Chuckie has also remixed songs for, among others, Michael Jackson and David Guetta and has produced for 50 Cent, Kesha and Akon. Further, his work has been showcased on the popular EDM focused show "What's Hot in EDM?" on BBC Radio 1.

He also owns his record label, Dirty Dutch Music.

He currently hosts the one-hour rap, trap and hip hop show on KissFresh from 11pm every Wednesday.

== Discography ==
=== Studio albums ===
List of studio albums with selected details
Title	Album details	Peak chart positions
Title	Album details	NLD
The Best of Chuckie	Released: November 10, 2013; Label: Cr2; Format: CD, digital download	100

== Singles ==
=== As lead artist ===
List of singles as lead artist, with selected chart positions, showing year released and album name
Title	Year	Peak chart positions								Certifications	Album
Title	Year	NLD	AUS	AUT	BEL	FRA	GER	SWE	SWI	Certifications	Album
"Let the Bass Kick in Miami Bitch" (with LMFAO)	2009	23	55	—	17	—	—	—	—	BPI: Silver	The Best of Chuckie
"Move It 2 the Drum" (with Hardwell featuring Ambush)	2010	—	—	—	—	—	—	—	—		The Best of Chuckie
"What Happens in Vegas" (featuring Gregor Salto)	2011	—	—	—	37	—	—	—	—		The Best of Chuckie
"Who Is Ready to Jump"	2011	—	—	—	—	—	—	—	—		The Best of Chuckie
"Together"	2012	—	—	—	—	—	—	—	—		The Best of Chuckie
"Breaking Up" (with Promise Land featuring Amanda Wilson)	2012	—	—	—	—	—	—	—	—		The Best of Chuckie
"Make Some Noise" (with Junxterjack)	2012	—	—	—	—	—	—	—	—		The Best of Chuckie
"Makin' Papers" (featuring Lupe Fiasco, Too Short and Snow Tha Product)	2013	—	—	—	—	—	—	—	—		Non-album singles
"Skydive" (featuring Maiday)	2013	—	—	—	26	53	—	—	—		Non-album singles
"Dirty Funkin Beats"	2014	—	—	—	—	—	—	—	—		Non-album singles
"Bitches Be Like"	2014	—	—	—	—	—	—	—	—		Non-album singles
"Want You Back"	2015	—	—	—	—	—	—	—	—		Non-album singles
"High" (with R-Wan featuring MC Stik-E)	2016	—	—	—	—	—	—	—	—		Non-album singles
"Back in the Day" (with Tom Enzy featuring GVO LV)	2018	—	—	—	—	—	—	—	—		Non-album singles
"Face Down" (with Tom Enzy)	2019	—	—	—	—	—	—	—	—		Non-album singles
"Bugatti Ridin" (with Sirona)	2021	—	—	—	—	—	—	—	—		Non-album singles
"—" denotes a recording that did not chart or was not released in that territory.

=== As featured artist ===
List of singles as featured artist, with selected chart positions and certifications, showing year released and album name
Title	Year	Peak chart positions								Certifications	Album
Title	Year	NLD	AUS	AUT	BEL	FRA	GER	SWE	SWI	Certifications	Album
"1234" (Laidback Luke featuring Chuckie and Martin Solveig)	2012	—	—	—	—	—	—	—	—		Non-album singles
"NRG" (GLOWINTHEDARK featuring Chuckie)	2013	—	—	—	—	—	—	—	—		Non-album singles
"Oldschool Sound" (Yves V featuring Chuckie)	2014	—	—	—	—	—	—	—	—		Non-album singles
"—" denotes a recording that did not chart or was not released in that territory.

=== Remixes ===
2003

- Ixxel – "Drop That Beat" (DJ Chuckie Mix)

2005

- Gio – "X–Girl" (DJ Chuckie Remix)
- Brace – "Hartendief" (DJ Chuckie Remix)

2006

- Real El Canario – "U Rock" (Chuckie's Not In Amsterdam Remix)

2007

- Ron Carroll – "Walking Down the Street" (Gregor Salto, Chuckie & Dave Moreaux Remix)

2008

- Sidney Samson featuring MC Stretch – "Pump Up the Stereo" (DJ Chuckie & Dave Moreaux Remix)
- Unders and Drrie – "3 Days in Kazachstan" (Chuckie Remix)
- The Partysquad – "Stuk" (Chuckie's Hustled Up Mix)
- Joachim Garraud – "Are U Ready" (Chuckie Remix)

2009

- David Guetta, Chris Willis, Steve Angello and Sebastian Ingrosso – "Everytime We Touch" (Chuckie Remix)
- David Guetta featuring Akon – "Sexy Bitch" (Chuckie & Lil Jon Remix)
- David Guetta featuring Estelle – "One Love" (Chuckie & Fatman Scoop Remix)
- Bob Sinclar featuring Shabba Ranks – "Love You No More" (Chuckie Remix)
- Groovewatchers – "Sexy Girl" (DJ Chuckie Remix)
- Hardwell and Rehab – "Blue Magic" (Chuckie & Silvio Ecomo Remix)
- Chris Kaeser – "Who's in the House" (DJ Chuckie Remix)
- Sunnery James and Ryan Marciano – "Pondo" (Chuckie & Silvio Ecomo Mix)

2010

- Bob Sinclar featuring Sean Paul – "Tik Tok" (Chuckie & R3hab Remix)
- 3OH!3 featuring Kesha – "First Kiss" (Chuckie Remix Extended)
- Black Eyed Peas – "Rock That Body" (Chuckie Remix)
- Kelly Rowland featuring David Guetta – "Commander" (Chuckie & Albert Neve Remix)
- Enrique Iglesias featuring Ludacris and DJ Frank E – "Tonight (I'm Lovin' You)" (Chuckie Remix)
- Enrique Iglesias featuring Pitbull – "I Like It" (Chuckie Remix)
- Robbie Rivera featuring Fast Eddie – "Let Me Sip My Drink" (Chuckie Remix)
- Sidney Samson featuring Lady Bee – "Shut Up & Let It Go" (Chuckie Remix)
- Luis Lopez vs. Jesse Lee – "Is This Love" (Chuckie Remix)
- Erick Morillo and Eddie Thoneick featuring Shawnee Taylor – "Live Your Life" (Chuckie Remix)
- Toni Braxton – "So Yesterday" (Chuckie Remix)
- Sergio Mauri featuring Janet Gray – "Everybody Dance" (Chuckie Remix)
- Nari & Milani and Cristian Marchi featuring Luciana – "I Got My Eye on You" (Chuckie Remix)
- Pendulum – "Witchcraft" (Chuckie Remix)
- Mohombi – "Bumpy Ride" (Chuckie Remix)
- Moby – "Jltf" (Chuckie Remix)
- Lil Jon featuring Claude Kelly – "Oh What a Night" (Chuckie Remix)
- Felix Da Housecat – "Silver Screen Shower Scene" (Chuckie & Silvio Ecomo Acid Mix)
- Picco – "Venga" (Chuckie's Back to Voltage Remix)
- Diddy - Dirty Money – "Hello, Good Morning" (Chuckie's Bad Boy Went Dirty Dutch Remix)
- Lock 'N Load – "Blow Ya Mind 2011" (Chuckie Meets Obek & Neve Mix)
- Nervo featuring Ollie James – "Irresistible" (Chuckie & Gregori Klosman Remix)

2011

- Michael Jackson – "Hollywood Tonight" (Chuckie Remix)
- Ely Supastar and Henry L featuring Dawn Tallman – "Money for Love" (Chuckie Remix)
- DJ Smash – "From Russia with Love" (Chuckie & Gregori Klosman Remix)
- Carolina Márquez – "Wicked Wow" (DJ Chuckie Extended Mix)
- Nause – "Made Of" (Chuckie Remix)
- Mastiksoul and Dada featuring Akon and Paul G - "Bang It All" (Chuckie Remix)
- Diddy - Dirty Money - "I Hate That You Love Me" (Chuckie Marquee Remix)
- Jean-Roch featuring Flo Rida and Kat Deluna – "I'm Alright" (Chuckie Remix)
- Erick Morillo and Eddie Thoneick featuring Shawnee Taylor – "Stronger" (Chuckie & Gregori Klosman Remix)
- Eva – "Ashes" (Chuckie Remix)
- Wynter Gordon – "Buy My Love" (Chuckie Remix)
- The Saturdays – "Notorious" (Chuckie Extended Mix)
- DJ Obek featuring Ambush – "Craissy" (Chuckie & Albert Neve 4Ibiza Remix)
- Laurent Wery featuring Swift K.I.D. and Dev – "Hey Hey Hey (Pop Another Bottle)" (Chuckie Club Mix)
- Rihanna featuring Calvin Harris – "We Found Love" (Chuckie Extended Mix)
- Kelly Rowland – "Down for Whatever" (Chuckie Remix)
- Neon Hitch – "Bad Dog" (Chuckie Remix)
- Wildboys – "Dominoes" (Chuckie Extended Mix)

2012

- Neon Hitch - "F U Betta" (Chuckie Club Remix)
- Sarvi - "Amore" (Chuckie Remix)
- Donaeo - "Party Hard" (Genairo Nvilla & Chuckie Amazone Project Remix)
- Skepta - "Punch His Face" (Genairo Nvilla & Chuckie King Of Drums Rework)
- Aba and Simonsen - "Soul Bossa Nova" (Chuckie & Mastiksoul Remix)
- KeeMo featuring Cosmo Klein - "Beautiful Lie" (Chuckie, Ortzy & Nico Hamuy Remix)
- Dada Life - "Rolling Stones T-Shirt" (Chuckie Remix)
- Milk & Sugar featuring Neri Per Caso - "Via Con Me (It's Wonderful)" (Chuckie Remix)
- Wallpaper - "Fucking Best Song Ever" (Chuckie & Glowinthedark Remix)
- Baauer - "Harlem Shake" (Chuckie Remix)
- Sub Focus featuring Alpines - "Tidal Wave" (Chuckie Remix)
- Roscoe Dash - "Good Good Night" (Chuckie & Horny Sanchez Smash Krank Remix)
- Krewella - "Killin' It" (Chuckie Remix)

2013

- Pitbull featuring TJR - "Don't Stop the Party" (Chuckie's Funky Vodka Mix)

2014

- Timeflies – "All the Way" (Chuckie Remix)
- Shakira - "Dare (La La La)" (Chuckie Remix)
- T-ara - "Sugar Free" (Chuckie Remix)
- Deadmau5 - "Ghosts 'n' Stuff" (Chuckie Remix)

2015

- Cash Cash ft. Busta Rhymez, B.O.B and Neon Hitch - "Devil" (Chuckie & Diamond Pistols Remix)
- Childsplay ft. Jayh - "Bobbel" (Chuckie & Childsplay Remix)

Guest appearances

- 2010: "Work It Out" (Lil Jon featuring Pitbull and Chuckie)
- 2011: "It's Not You (It's Me)" (T-Pain vs. Chuckie featuring Pitbull)
