= Granite (song) =

Single by Pendulum

from the album In Silico
- Released: 5 November 2007
- Recorded: 2007
- Genre: Drum and bass; breakbeat; electronic rock; space rock
- Length: 4:41 (album version); 3:45 (radio edit)
- Label: Warner Music UK
- Songwriter: Rob Swire
- Producers: Rob Swire; Gareth McGrillen

Pendulum singles chronology
"Blood Sugar" / "Axle Grinder" (2007)	"Granite" (2007)	"Propane Nightmares" (2008)

"Granite" is a song by Australian drum and bass band Pendulum, released as the first single from their second studio album In Silico. It was released through Warner Music UK, and through the band's new Earstorm imprint with Warner Music Group. The song entered the UK Singles Chart on 11 November 2007, peaking at number 29 on 2 December. The single is supposedly inspired by the likes of video game boss battles, including the theme of various battles against the Mario series' Bowser; specifically, the intro is directly inspired by the beginning of the music from the castle stages in Super Mario World. Q magazine named it 24th in the 50 top records of December 2007. When played in reverse, the main melody changes into the melody used in the end of the song, and vice versa. The song is featured in Need for Speed Undercover, and also an ATV game of Pure.

== Music video ==
The music video is centred on the theme of ufology and aliens visiting Earth. The video features "amateur" video footage of various UFO sightings over cities and famous landmarks and monuments, as well as simulated news footage. Some of the UFOs resemble Pendulum's logo on their "In Silico" album and were later seen again in the music video for their other single "The Other Side". Locations include: Rome, Italy; Brussels, Belgium; Barcelona, Spain; Mexico City, Mexico; Paris, France; and London, England. In the last few images of the video a ghostly silhouette of an alien can be seen from an upstairs window.

== Chart performance ==
"Granite" entered the UK Singles Chart on 11 November 2007 at number 48 based solely on downloads from iTunes and 7digital. Following the release of physical formats the song peaked at number 29 on 2 December, making it their second most successful original hit to date at the time – their remix of "Voodoo People" originally by The Prodigy having reached number twenty on 2 October 2005. This achievement was later surpassed by their next single "Propane Nightmares" which peaked in the charts at number nine. "Granite" remained in the chart for a total of six weeks.

== Criticism ==
The track was criticised by veteran jungle and drum and bass producer, Goldie.

== Track listing ==
These are the major formats and associated track listings of single releases of "Granite".

12-inch single
(WEA436T; released 26 November 2007)

A. "Granite" – 4:26
B. "Granite" (Dillinja remix) – 4:20

CD single
(WEA436CD; released 26 November 2007)

1. "Granite" – 4:26
2. "Granite" (Dillinja remix) – 4:20

Limited edition 12-inch single
(PR017045; released 5 November 2007)

A. "Granite" – 4:26

Promo CD single
(PR017042; released 5 November 2007)

1. "Granite" (radio edit) – 3:45
2. "Granite" (original version) – 4:26

== Personnel ==
The following people contributed to "Granite".

- Rob Swire – vocals, synthesizer, mixing
- Peredur ap Gwynedd – guitars
- Paul Kodish – drums
- Gareth McGrillen – bass guitar
- Simon Askew – mixing
- Dave Bascombe – mixing
- John Davis – mastering

== Charts ==
Chart (2007)	Peak position
UK Singles Chart	29

== Release history ==
Region	Release date	Format	Catalogue
Various	4 November 2007	Download single	None
United Kingdom	26 November 2007	12-inch single	WEA436T
United Kingdom	26 November 2007	CD single	WEA436CD
United Kingdom	2 December 2007	Download reissue	None
