= Propane Nightmares =

Single by Pendulum

from the album In Silico
- Released: 12 April 2008
- Recorded: 2007–2008
- Genre: Drum and bass; electronic rock
- Length: 5:13 (album version); 4:19 (radio edit)
- Label: Warner Music UK
- Songwriters: Rob Swire; Bernd Burhoff; Oliver Froning; Jens Oettrich
- Producer: Rob Swire

Pendulum singles chronology
"Granite" (2007)	"Propane Nightmares" (2008)	"The Other Side" (2008)

Music video
- Pendulum video – "Propane Nightmares"

"Propane Nightmares" is a song by Australian drum and bass band Pendulum, released as the second single from their second album In Silico. It incorporates elements of the song "Million Miles from Home" by German happy hardcore band Dune. It has received significant airplay on BBC Radio 1, being played frequently by DJ Zane Lowe.

The song was released exclusively for download on 12 April 2008 in Australia and New Zealand, where Pendulum were on tour at the time. It was later released globally for download on 21 April, and on physical formats on 28 April. The song reached number sixteen in the UK Singles Chart on April 27 based on downloads alone, and on May 4, the song peaked at number nine. It was also the official theme song of WWE Cyber Sunday 2008 as well as being used as background music for the official video highlights of the 2008 Belgian Grand Prix. It is also used as the runout song for Rotherham United football team.

== Critical reception ==
"Propane Nightmares" has received mixed reviews from music critics, mostly as a result of the change in style compared to older tracks produced by Pendulum. Some reviewers praised the new direction that the band had taken, for example Gerard McGarry wrote, in an article for Unreality Music, that Pendulum "have created an epic song that – for our money – fuses their penchant for dance and rock music beautifully". Jo-Ann Greene of Allmusic described the song as "another sizzling single" in her review of In Silico, while Fiona McGlynn wrote that "...Propane Nightmares is a fresh take on a merge of genres that actually works", in her single review for the Manchester Evening News. It was also named 38th in Q magazine's Q50 of April 2008.

The track also received some criticism, mostly derived from Pendulum's migration from drum and bass to a more rock-imbued sound. In his review for AngryApe, Tim Johnson pointed out that "the problem... lies in Pendulum trying to cram too much into one space... almost like two or three different songs being played on top of one another". Simon Catling went further, writing an open letter in the webzine God Is in the TV to Pendulum asking them to "decide whether [they] wish to be a band or a drum n’ bass act" and commenting that "at the moment all [they're] providing us with is a horribly half-baked and shoddy form of neither".

On 22 July 2008, it was announced that "Propane Nightmares" had been nominated for Best Single at the Kerrang! Awards 2008 ceremony, alongside singles from four other rock bands. The ceremony was held on 21 August, and Pendulum lost to Thirty Seconds to Mars who took Best Single with their song "From Yesterday".

== Music video ==
Members of a cult congregating in an isolated building in the "Propane Nightmares" music video.

A music video was also produced themed around a religious cult closely resembling Heaven's Gate, in particular depicting the mass suicide of members of a cult by poison after first drinking citric juices. Several scenes of Pendulum performing before the cult are intercut in the middle of the video, which otherwise focuses primarily on two members who attempt to flee during the mass suicides. It features English actor Marc Baylis, who later became famous for his role as Rob Donovan in Coronation Street.

The video was originally uploaded to the band's YouTube channel as early as 27 March 2008 to help promote the single. It was later released for download in May, most notably through the digital media delivery service Xbox Live, which allowed all users to download the video freely. It was also included on the special edition and iTunes bonus tracks versions of In Silico, the album from which the song was originally taken.

== Chart performance ==
"Propane Nightmares" entered the UK Singles Chart on 27 April 2008 at number sixteen based on downloads alone. After the release of physical formats during the following week, the song peaked at number nine on 4 May, becoming their first UK top 10 single. It also entered the Billboard European Hot 100 chart, peaking on 17 May at number 32 and remaining in the chart for a total of ten weeks. "Propane Nightmares" was also the band's first charting single in the United States, reaching number 38 on the Billboard Hot Modern Rock Tracks chart in December 2008. It was also featured on Now 70, the first of the band's songs to be featured in a Now! album.

== Track listing ==
These are the major formats and associated track listings of single releases of "Propane Nightmares", which was written by Rob Swire, Bernd Burhoff, Oliver Froning and Jens Oettrich.

12-inch vinyl single
(WEA445T; released 28 April 2008)

A. "Propane Nightmares" – 5:13
B. "Propane Nightmares" (V.I.P. mix) – 5:22

CD single
(WEA445CD; released 28 April 2008)

1. "Propane Nightmares" (radio edit) – 4:19
2. "Propane Nightmares" (original version) – 5:13

Digital EP
(iTunes Store, 7digital; released 18 April 2008)

1. "Propane Nightmares" – 5:13
2. "Propane Nightmares" (V.I.P. mix) – 5:22
3. "Propane Nightmares" (VST remix) – 4:48

Promo CD single

1. "Propane Nightmares" (Celldweller remix) – 5:36
2. "Propane Nightmares" (VST remix) – 4:48

== Personnel ==
The following people contributed to "Propane Nightmares".

- Rob Swire – vocals, synthesiser, mixing
- Peredur ap Gwynedd – guitar
- Paul Kodish – drums
- Gareth McGrillen – bass, secondary vocals
- Andy Wood – trombone
- Andy Greenwood – trumpet
- Craig Wild – trumpet
- Simon Askew – mixing
- John Davis – mastering

== Charts ==
=== Weekly charts ===
Chart (2008)	Peak position
Europe (European Hot 100)	32
Scottish Singles Sales (Official Charts)	20
UK Singles (OCC)	9
UK Dance (Official Charts)	3
US Alternative Airplay (Billboard)	38

=== Year-end charts ===
Chart (2008)	Position
UK Singles (OCC)	80

== Certifications ==
Region	Certification	Certified units/sales
New Zealand (RMNZ)	Gold	15,000^{‡}
United Kingdom (BPI)	Gold	400,000^{‡}
^{‡} Sales+streaming figures based on certification alone.

== Release history ==
Region	Release date	Format	Catalogue
Australia; New Zealand	12 April 2008	Download single	None
Australia; New Zealand	18 April 2008	Digital EP	None
Various	21 April 2008	Download single	None
Various	21 April 2008	Digital EP	None
United Kingdom	28 April 2008	12-inch single	WEA445T
United Kingdom	28 April 2008	CD single	WEA445CD

== Cover versions and remixes ==
The song has been remixed by popular artist Celldweller and Australian electropop group Van She. The Celldweller remix is included in the soundtrack for the video games, including MotorStorm: Arctic Edge and KickBeat.

American musician Grabbitz produced a remix as a featured guest on Pendulum's remix album The Reworks.
