= Production assistant =

Person responsible for various aspects of a film or TV production

A production assistant, also known as a PA, is a member of the film crew and is a job title used in filmmaking and television for a person responsible for various aspects of a production. The job of a PA can vary greatly depending on the budget and specific requirements of a production as well as whether the production is unionized. Production assistants on films are sometimes attached to individual actors or filmmakers.

== Television and feature film ==
In unionized television and feature film, production assistants are usually divided into different categories. Variations exist depending on a show's structure or region of the world.

- Office PAs usually spend most hours in the respective show's production office handling such tasks as phones, deliveries, script copies, lunch pick-ups, and related tasks in coordination with the production manager and production coordinator.
- Set PAs work on the physical set of the production, whether on location or on a sound stage. They report to the assistant director (AD) department and key set PA if one is so designated. Duties include calling out "rolls" and "cuts", locking up (making sure nothing interferes with a take), wrangling actors and background, facilitating communication between departments, distributing paperwork and radios, and related tasks as mandated by the ADs. Set PAs usually work 12- to 16-hour days with the possibility at the end of a shoot to work more than 20 hours a single day.
- Post-production PAs work in an administrative office, focusing on film quality, arranging schedules, organizing workload and getting coffee.
- Truck PAs drive trucks carrying equipment from place to place.
- Locations PAs accompany the location manager and assist in any needed tasks. "They're wherever the location manager needs them to be on any particular day."
- Extra or daily PAs are brought and needed, frequently supporting a second unit.
- Set Runner PAs do general tasks, such as buying stationery, taking lunch orders, copying call sheets and getting coffee.

== Commercials ==
Commercial Set PAs share the same responsibilities as their Television and Feature Film counterparts (see "Set PAs" above), but also inherit additional responsibilities traditionally encompassed by other departments in the television and feature film structure. The tasks range from providing both critical and mundane production support equipment such as dollies, cranes, director's chairs and pop-up tents to standing in for talent and even filling in for other departments who might be shortstaffed. It is not atypical for a commercial set PA to be seen handling trash one minute, and the next minute assisting the electricians or grips with a set-up. A select group of commercial set PAs are given the responsibility of driving and managing the production and camera cube trucks. That responsibility is often given to more senior PAs because it provides several extra days of pay.

Set PAs in commercials are more commonly hired by the production coordinator and/or production manager as opposed to an AD or key set PA. However, many commercial ADs will also perform this responsibility. Standard rate for a commercial PA in the Los Angeles area is a flat rate of $200 per day. On February 1, 2008, benefits for qualifying freelance PAs became available through the Producer's Health Benefits Plan.

== Union vs. non-union ==
With the exception of Quebec, in North America, no union currently exists for production assistants, but the affiliation of a production with a union (or unions) can affect the job responsibilities of a PA. Less unionized film productions have more positions that can be serviced by non-union personnel; consequently, PAs on such productions may take on a greater variety of non-traditional duties. Examples of this would be a PA setting a light bounce (grip department) or driving a passenger van (teamster/transportation department). PAs on a union production generally have less variety in their job duties whereas a non-union PA can be asked to perform any kind of task by a department head.

In British Columbia, which has the third largest film and television production sector in North America, PAs are represented by the Directors Guild of Canada. Production assistants represented by the DGC work in the Locations Department and work both on and off set with duties including locking up the set, traffic control, echoing rolls, firewatching, and liaising with the public and location owners. The Key-PA is in charge of all the PAs and is the 1st ADs' right-hand man when it comes to do with the on set aspects regarding a location. From the position of Key-PA, DGC PA's can move up through the Locations Department or the Assistant Direction (AD) Department as either a Training Locations Manager (TAL) or a Training Assistant Director (TAD), respectively. Office production assistants work in the production office as an Office PA and they work for the Production Manager, Production Coordinator, Assistant Production Coordinator, and / or other office staff in maintaining the work-flow in the office. From that position, Office PAs can work their way up through the office by becoming an Assistant Production Coordinator (APOC), which is unionized under IATSE 891. Pay for PAs according to the DGC Collective Agreement in BC is $283.93 (non-key) to $290.28 (key) for a 15-hour day. An 8-hour day is approximately $117.00.

In Quebec, the Set PA is part of what is called the "Unit Department" or "Régie". Usually, there is a Unit Manager, Assistant Unit Manager, Set PA, Truck PA, Set Runner, and the "dailies" as needed for street blocking and extra set ups. In other states and provinces these duties are often taken care of by the AD Department, Locations or Transport. The Unit Manager and his/her team are the ones who deal with the daily logistics of shooting on location and/or in studio. There are two film unions in Quebec: IATSE 514 and AQTIS: L'Alliance québécoise des techniciens de l'image et du son. In both cases the PA's are unionized.

== Publication ==
Production assistants are also present in fields other than film and television, as publication businesses also have a need for PAs to regulate the production process of making professional written pieces such as articles, books, records or any other kind of production involving the preparation of written words.

=== Educational and publishing companies ===
The tasks taken on by a PA will depend on the type of educational and/or publishing company that employs them. If the assistant works at a textbook or publishing company, they may oversee the art and composition of written works. P.A.s at educational companies may also oversee work in proofreading departments, as well as for freelance copy editors and authors. When looking at documents and other materials uploaded by the author the production assistant has to make sure everything falls within the requirements of the company they work for. That includes items such as the format, correct file types, positioning, captions and obtaining copyright forms from authors.

If the assistant is part of a publications department for a scientific or professional organization, they have daily jobs that which involve keeping records that are important for their company. They may take care of editing, sending or reading information in databases or manuscripts. Production assistants may also team up with information technology (IT) workers to help streamline the tasks of the publications departments since it involves keeping track of large amounts of data and information. Working with an IT department to create a specific sorting program can improve the speed at which documents are proofed and organized.

=== Entertainment companies ===
In entertainment companies, production assignments may have to do technical work such as typesetting, printing and binding. They must also be good communicators and be good with deadlines. When working for magazines or newspapers, production assistants may need to keep track of things like individual teams and the cost of producing a physical product. Clients and stakeholders may be involved in magazine work, so PA's have to be professional. There may also be journalists who are on deadlines or need extensions. There are also creative processes with which a production assistant may be involved. They are able to work with book designers or magazines to ensure a client's specifications are followed properly and may then have to send a copy of the draft for approval to clients. That can last until the final piece has been completed. When printing a piece of work, production assistants may deal with is how files are supposed to be submitted to printers, along with publication dates, and any printing or copy issues. Even after a final piece is complete, the PA may need to ask a client their thoughts on final product.
