= DJ Fresh discography =

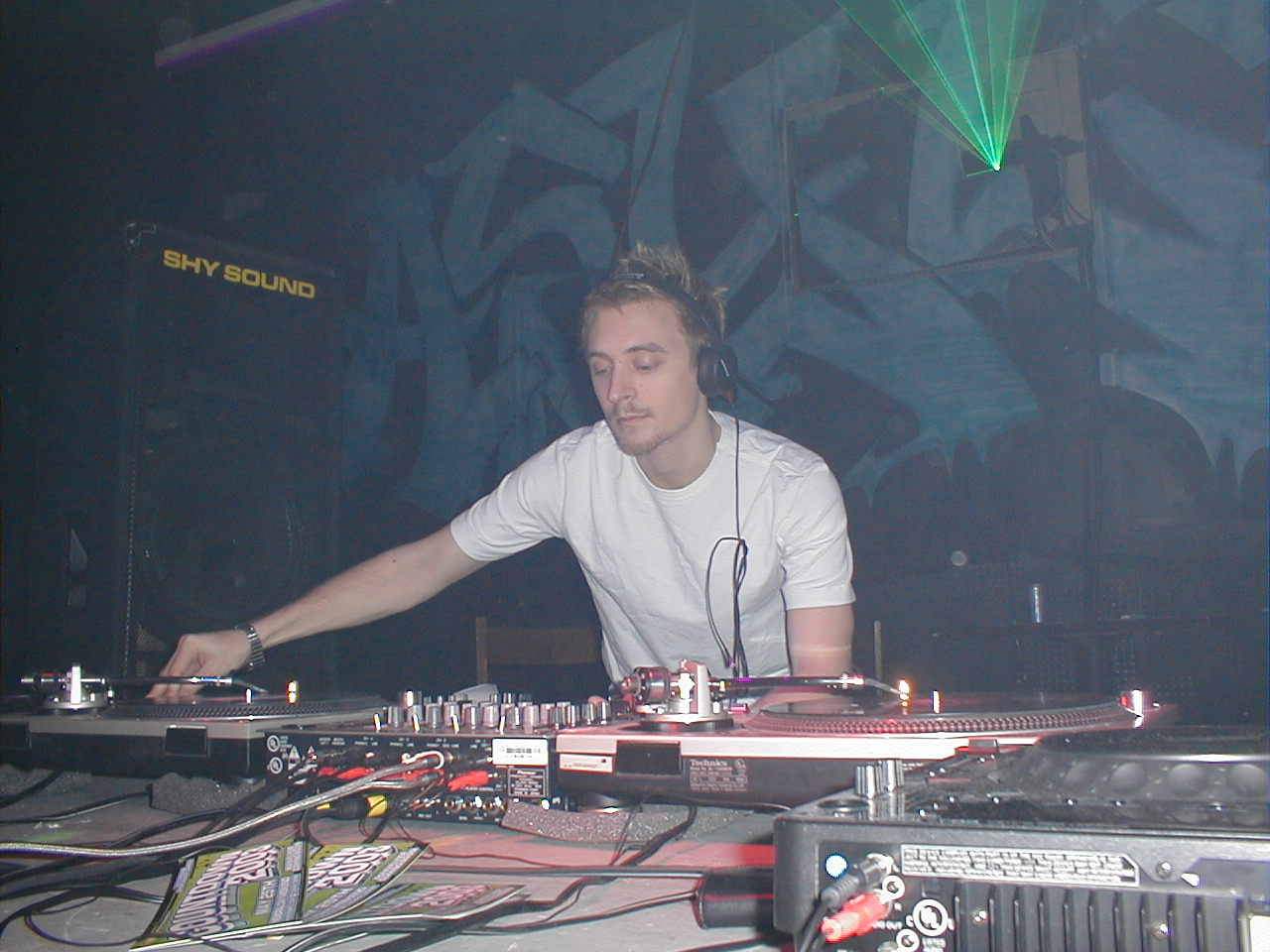
- DJ Fresh performing at a rave in Springfield, Massachusetts in 2003.
- Studio albums: 3
- Compilation albums: 4
- Singles: 29
- Music videos: 12
- Remixes: 11

The discography of DJ Fresh, an English drum and bass and dubstep producer and DJ, consists of three studio albums and 29 singles.

On 1 August 2010 he re-released his song "Gold Dust" featuring vocals from Ce'Cile, whereafter it peaked at 22 in the UK and 39 in Ireland, marking his first Top 40 hit in both countries. On 16 August, he released his second studio album, Kryptonite which peaked at 4 on the UK Dance Chart. He then released his follow-up single, called "Lassitude" with Sigma and vocals from Koko. It peaked at 98 on the UK Singles Chart and 11 on the UK Dance Chart.

"Louder", the first single from his third album Nextlevelism, was released on 3 July 2011. The song was used as part of a Lucozade Lite advertising campaign in the UK and Ireland. The song features vocals from Welsh singer Sian Evans and peaked number 4 on the Irish Singles Chart and was his first ever number one on the UK Singles Chart. On 12 February 2012, the second single "Hot Right Now", featuring British singer Rita Ora, became his second number one in the UK, and the first drum and bass song to chart at number one in the UK. The third single from the album, "The Power", which features rapper Dizzee Rascal, was officially released on 3 June 2012 it debuted and peaked at number 6 on the UK Singles Chart. The fourth single, "The Feeling", which features RaVaughn, was officially released on 23 September 2012 it debuted and peaked at number 13 in the UK. Nextlevelism was released on 1 October 2012, peaking at number 14 on the UK Albums Chart.

== Albums ==
=== Studio albums ===
Title	Details	Peak chart positions				Certifications
Title	Details	UK	AUS	BEL (FL)	SCO	Certifications
Escape from Planet Monday	Released: 22 May 2006; Label: Breakbeat Kaos (BBK003); Format: 12" LP, CD, digital download	—	—	—	—	
Kryptonite	Released: 16 August 2010; Label: Breakbeat Kaos (BBK006); Format: 12" LP, CD, digital download	117	—	—	—	
Nextlevelism	Released: 1 October 2012; Label: Ministry of Sound; Format: CD, digital download	14	96	92	24	BPI: Gold
"—" denotes a title that did not chart, or was not released in that territory.

=== Compilation albums ===
Title	Details
Breakbeat Kaos	Released: 18 August 2003; Label: Ministry of Sound (MOSCD 74); Format: 12" LP, CD
Jungle Sound: The Bassline Strikes Back!	Released: 4 October 2004; Label: Breakbeat Kaos (BBK #001CD); Formats: 12" LP, CD
Bass Invaderz	Released: February 2005; Label: Human Imprint Recordings (HUMA8014-2); Formats: 12" LP, CD
Jungle Sound: Gold	Released: 13 November 2006; Label: Breakbeat Kaos (BBK #001CD); Formats: CD, digital download

== Extended plays ==
Title	Details
Cactus Funk '02	Released: 2005; Formats: Digital download
Future Jungle	Released: 14 March 2011; Label: RAM Records; Formats: Digital download
Dancing in the Dark	Released: 18 February 2022; Label: Breakbeat Kaos; Formats: Digital download
Gold Dust (10th Anniversary Remixes)	Released: 14 April 2022; Label: Breakbeat Kaos; Formats: Digital download

== Singles ==
=== As lead artist ===
Title	Year	Peak chart positions									Certifications	Album
Title	Year	UK	AUS	AUT	BEL (FL)	GER	IRE	NL	SWI	SCO	Certifications	Album
"Submarines"	2004	73	—	—	—	—	—	—	—	—		Escape from Planet Monday
"When the Sun Goes Down" (featuring Adam F)	2004	68	—	—	—	—	—	—	—	—		Jungle Sound: The Bassline Strikes Back!
"All That Jazz" (featuring MC Darrison)	2005	—	—	—	—	—	—	—	—	—		Escape from Planet Monday
"X Project"	2005	—	—	—	—	—	—	—	—	—		Escape from Planet Monday
"Funk Academy"	2005	—	—	—	—	—	—	—	—	—		Escape from Planet Monday
"The Immortal"	2006	—	—	—	—	—	—	—	—	—		Escape from Planet Monday
"Nervous" (featuring Mary Byker)	2006	—	—	—	—	—	—	—	—	—		Escape from Planet Monday
"Chainsaw"	2008	—	—	—	—	—	—	—	—	—		Chainsaw / The Union
"The Union"	2008	—	—	—	—	—	—	—	—	—		Chainsaw / The Union
"Hypercaine" (featuring Stamina MC and Koko)	2009	—	—	—	—	—	—	—	—	—		Kryptonite
"Gold Dust" (featuring Ce'Cile)	2010	24	—	—	24	—	—	—	—	32	BPI: 3× Platinum	Kryptonite
"Lassitude" (with Sigma featuring Koko)	2010	98	—	—	—	—	—	—	—	—		Kryptonite
"Louder" (featuring Sian Evans)	2011	1	82	—	5	—	4	—	—	1	BPI: Platinum	Nextlevelism
"Hot Right Now" (featuring Rita Ora)	2012	1	46	24	11	28	17	22	39	2	BPI: Platinum	Nextlevelism
"Gold Dust" (Nextlevelism re-release) (featuring Ms. Dynamite)	2012	22	—	—	24	—	39	—	—	32		Nextlevelism
"The Power" (featuring Dizzee Rascal)	2012	6	—	—	—	—	25	—	—	5		Nextlevelism
"The Feeling" (featuring RaVaughn)	2012	13	—	—	28	—	64	—	—	16		Nextlevelism
"Earthquake" (with Diplo featuring Dominique Young Unique)	2013	4	—	—	21	—	42	—	—	6	BPI: Silver	Non-album singles
"Dibby Dibby Sound" (with Jay Fay featuring Ms. Dynamite)	2014	3	—	—	23	—	36	—	—	3	BPI: Silver	Non-album singles
"Make U Bounce" (with TC featuring Little Nikki)	2014	10	—	—	25	—	—	—	—	7		Non-album singles
"Flashlight" (featuring Ellie Goulding)	2014	47	—	—	71	—	—	—	—	36		Halcyon Days
"Gravity" (featuring Ella Eyre)	2015	4	—	—	16	—	67	86	—	5	BPI: Platinum	Feline
"Believer" (with Adam F)	2015	58	—	—	72	—	—	—	—	38		Non-album singles
"How Love Begins" (with High Contrast featuring Dizzee Rascal)	2016	53	—	—	—	—	—	—	—	26		Non-album singles
"Bang Bang" (vs Diplo featuring R. City, Selah Sue and Craig David)	2016	—	—	—	35	—	—	—	—	—		Non-album singles
"Shots" (featuring Jakes)	2017	—	—	—	—	—	—	—	—	—		Jungle Sound: Revenge of the Bass - 15 Years of Breakbeat Kaos
"Never Wanna Stop / Civilization" (with Macky Gee & DJ Phantasy)	2018	—	—	—	—	—	—	—	—	—		Jungle Sound: Revenge of the Bass - 15 Years of Breakbeat Kaos
"Control" (with Doctrine)	2019	—	—	—	—	—	—	—	—	—		Non-album singles
"Drive"	2020	—	—	—	—	—	—	—	—	—		Non-album singles
"Dancing in the Dark" (with Buunshin)	2022	—	—	—	—	—	—	—	—	—		Dancing in the Dark
"Exorcist" (with Vegas)	2022	—	—	—	—	—	—	—	—	—		Non-album singles
"Higher" (with Used featuring Nikki Ambers)	2022	—	—	—	—	—	—	—	—	—		Non-album singles
"—" denotes a title that did not chart, or was not released in that territory.

=== As featured artist ===
Title	Year	Peak chart positions	Album	Certifications
Title	Year	UK	Album	Certifications
"Tarantula" (Pendulum featuring DJ Fresh, $pyda and Tenor Fly)	2005	60	Hold Your Colour	BPI: Gold
"Say You Do" (Sigala featuring Imani and DJ Fresh)	2016	5	Brighter Days	BPI: Platinum

=== Promotional singles ===
Title	Year	Album
"Morning Glory" / "Thunder and Rain"	1998	Non-album singles
"Dead Man Walking" / "Formula One"	2003	Non-album singles
"Signal" / "Big Love"	2003	Non-album singles
"Colossus" / "Hooded"	2004	Non-album singles
"Twister" / "Capture the Flag"	2004	Non-album singles
"Supernature" (Baron vs. Fresh)	2005	Non-album singles
"Exhale"	2006	Non-album singles
"Balloons (Thinking in Reverse)"	2006	Non-album singles
"Steam (Rock Out)" (DJ Fresh vs. DJ Deekline and Wizard) / "Scream"	2007	Non-album singles
"Clap" / "Exhale" (Inhale Remix)	2008	Non-album singles
"All That Jazz" (Mosquito Remix) / "Windrush" (Heist Remix) (DJ Fresh featuring MC Darrison / Roni Size)	2009	Non-album singles
"Blow" (with Ivory vs Deekline and Wizard)	2009	Non-album singles
"Off World" / "Direct Order" (DJ Fresh / The Funktion)	2009	Non-album singles
"Heavyweight" / "Fantasia"	2009	Kryptonite
"Talkbox" / "Acid Rain"	2009	Kryptonite
"Elevator" (with Erik Arbores)	2016	Non-album single

== Remixes ==
Title	Year	Original Artist	Album
"Here Comes Trouble"	2003	Dillinja	Here Comes Trouble - A Decade of Drum and Bass
"Twist 'Em Out"	2003	Dillinja	Twist 'Em Out / Kids Stuff
"Mo' Fire"	2003	Andy C	Nightlife
"Cuban Links"	2004	DJ Clipz	Cuban Links (Fresh Remix) / Tripods
"Thugged Out Bitch"	2004	Dillinja	Spectrum (with Lemon D)
"Enuff"	2007	DJ Shadow	Enuff / This Time
"I Want You"	2010	Paul Harris vs. Eurythmics	I Want You (White label release)
"Cross My Heart"	2010	Skepta featuring Preeya Kalidas	Cross My Heart
"Together"	2011	Hervé	Together
"Broken Record"	2011	Katy B	Broken Record
"Right Beside You"	2011	Jakwob featuring Smiler	Right Beside You
"Who's Laughing Now"	2011	Jessie J	Who's Laughing Now
"Don't Go"	2011	Wretch 32 featuring Josh Kumra	Don't Go
"Neon"	2012	Doctor P featuring Jenna G	Neon
"It's Tricky"	2014	Run-DMC	It's Tricky (DJ Fresh Remix)
"Intoxicated"	2015	Martin Solveig & Good Times Ahead	Intoxicated (Remixes)
"Missing You"	2015	Cedric Gervais featuring Rooty	Missing You (DJ Fresh & Danny Howard Remix) (with Danny Howard)
"Higher Place"	2015	Dimitri Vegas & Like Mike featuring Ne-Yo	Higher Place (Remixes Pt. 2)
"Millionaire"	2016	Cash Cash & Digital Farm Animals featuring Nelly	Millionaire (Remixes)
"The Best You Had"	2018	Nina Nesbitt	The Best You Had (Remixes)

== Collaborations and other releases ==
Title	Year	Album
"Mutated (Version X)"	2002	Mutated for 200X (with Trace)
"Sandstorm (Sunrise)"	2002	Mutated for 200X (with Trace)
"U-Boat"	2002	Mutated for 200X (with Trace)
"Chain of Thought"	2002	Mutated for 200X (with Trace)
"Sausage Dog"	2003	3rd Planet (EP)
"Switch"	2003	21st Century Drum and Bass 3
"Warehouse Lick" (with Trace)	2003	Spy Technologies 2: Battlefield
"Kingston Vampires" (with Pendulum)	2004	Jungle Sound: The Bassline Strikes Back!
"Living Daylights"	2004	Jungle Sound: The Bassline Strikes Back!
"Floodlight"	2005	Bass Invaderz
"Play Me" (Swift and Blame Remix) (with Swift)	2005	Bass Invaderz
"Living Daylights II"	2007	The Immortal
"Ease Down"	2007	Inside the Machine / Lost and Found (Bad Company UK compilation)
"Trick of the Light"	2007	Inside the Machine / Lost and Found (Bad Company UK compilation)
"All That Jazz" (VIP Mix)	2008	Bryan G and MC Skibadee Live @ Movement Bar, Rumba
"X-Project" (VIP Mix)	2009	Heist's Mystery FM
"Spaceface"	2009	Unreleased / Incomplete
"Lazer Squad"	2009	Unreleased / Incomplete
"Up" (with Diplo)	2013	Unreleased / Incomplete
"Skyhighatrist" (Instrumental Edit)	2013	Andy C: Nightlife 6

== Production credits ==
Title	Year	Artist	Album
"Throw It Down" (with Benga)	2014	Dominique Young Unique	Non-album single
"New York City"	2019	Kylie Minogue	Step Back in Time: The Definitive Collection

== Music videos ==
Title	Year	Albums	Director
"Nervous"	2006	Escape from Planet Monday	Barney Howells
"Hypercaine"	2009	Kryptonite	Jeffrey Madoff
"Gold Dust"	2010	Kryptonite	Ben Newman
"Lassitude"	2010	Kryptonite	Rollo Jackson
"Louder"	2011	Nextlevelism	Ben Newman
"Hot Right Now"	2012	Nextlevelism	Rohan Blair-Mangat
"The Power"	2012	Nextlevelism	Rohan Blair-Mangat
"The Feeling"	2012	Nextlevelism	Ivan Oglivie
"Earthquake"	2013	Untitled fourth studio album	Jonas & François
"Dibby Dibby Sound"	2013	Untitled fourth studio album	The Sacred Egg
"Make U Bounce"	2014	Untitled fourth studio album	Mickey Finnegan
"Gravity"	2014	Untitled fourth studio album	Jeffrey Madoff
