= Booksmart (soundtrack) =

2019 EP/ film score by Dan the Automator

Booksmart (Original Motion Picture Soundtrack)

EP / film score by Dan the Automator
- Released: May 24, 2019
- Recorded: 2018–2019
- Length: 29:53
- Label: Lakeshore
- Producer: Tony Giles

Dan the Automator chronology
Dan the Automator Presents 2K7 (2006)	Booksmart (Original Motion Picture Soundtrack) (2019)	Holidate (2020)

Booksmart (Original Motion Picture Soundtrack) is the film score soundtrack to the 2019 film Booksmart directed by Olivia Wilde and featured musical score composed by Daniel Nakamura under the stage name, Dan the Automator. The film score was released under the Lakeshore Records label on May 24, 2019. A separate album for the licensed music heard in the film was released in vinyl LP-only format in August 2019.

== Development ==
Booksmart marked Nakamura's maiden score for a major United States-produced feature as he primarily scored music for Chinese films and assisted with the scores of Scott Pilgrim vs. the World (2010) and Money Monster (2016). Wilde contacted his manager to discuss with him on the score, and eventually wanted him to push along the film's music. According to Nakamura, writing a film score as opposed to record production, would "bolster the emotional content of the scene, but also not getting in the way of the scene" which meant that it would also foreshadow and exaggerate the mood, at the same time being laid back and refrain from interfering with the dialogues.

The film takes inspiration from the romantic comedy films of the 1980s, mostly from the John Hughes directorials and broke conventional rules while scoring romantic comedies. Nakamura recalled on a sequence where the characters experience being on drugs for the first time, hence had to score it "to kind of capture the feeling [of what that's like]". He recalled that "the thing about it is, when you make music, you get certain aspects of the senses; one thing you don't usually get is a visual component to work off of. It's exciting [to work with film clips] because when you're sitting at home making music just to make music, it's a different dynamic. But with film scoring you get this whole different thematic dynamic energy that you get to bring to a project."

== Release ==
Booksmart (Original Motion Picture Soundtrack) was released through Lakeshore Records day-and-date with the film on May 24, 2019. A piece from the score "Broke a Couple of Rules" was released on May 20. The second album, Booksmart (Music from the Motion Picture) was released exclusively in limited vinyl LP records through Urban Outfitters retail stores and website on August 2, 2019, and was not released to streaming platforms.

== Reception ==
Monica Castillo of RogerEbert.com called the score as "a sensational mix that left me with an elated feeling by the time the credits rolled." Jake Coyle of Associated Press called it as a "thumping score". Peter DeBruge of Variety called the score and soundtrack as "infinitely cooler than its characters to supply much of its energy". Matt Shiverdecker of Austin American-Statesman described it as a "killer" and "beat-driven score". Alex De Vore of Santa Fe Reporter called it as a "hype-ass soundtrack".

== Track listing ==
No.	Title	Length
1.	"Full Star"	4:50
2.	"Amy Devastated"	6:00
3.	"Broke a Couple of Rules"	3:21
4.	"Molly and Nick Dance"	3:16
5.	"Handjobs / Graduation"	4:32
6.	"Amy Molly Fight"	3:41
7.	"One Night Left"	3:05
8.	"Ryan"	1:08
Total length:		29:53

== Additional music ==
The songs featured in the film include:

- "Boys" – Lizzo^{[a]}
- "To Whom It May Concern" – Sam i, CeeLo Green, Theophilus London, Alex Ebert^{[a]}
- "Nobody Speak" – DJ Shadow, Run the Jewels^{[a]}
- "Attitude" – Leikeli47
- "Holy Calamity [Bear Witness II]" – Handsome Boy Modeling School, DJ Shadow, DJ Quest
- "Slip Away" – Perfume Genius^{[a]}
- "Cold War" – Cautious Clay^{[a]}
- "Open" – Rhye
- "Can You Discover?" – Discovery^{[a]}
- "Double Rum Cola" (Single Edit) – FATA BOOM
- "Osaka Loop Line" – Discovery
- "I've Seen Footage" – Death Grips
- "Batshit" – Sofi Tukker
- "Give Up the Funk (Tear the Roof off the Sucker)" – Parliament
- "Push It" – Salt-N-Pepa
- "Come Down" – Anderson .Paak
- "What's Golden" – Jurassic 5^{[a]}
- "You Oughta Know" – Alanis Morissette
- "High on Your Love" – Kings Go Forth^{[a]}
- "Freeway" – Scapegoat Wax
- "Just Like Love (Jam City Remix)" – Perfume Genius, Jam City^{[a]}
- "Piano Sonata No. 14 in C-Sharp Minor, Op. 27, No. 2" – Ludwig van Beethoven, Istvan Szekely
- "How We Are" – Lia Ices^{[a]}
- "Carries On" – Edward Sharpe and the Magnetic Zeros^{[a]}
- "Unchained Melody" – Lykke Li^{[a]}
- "oh baby" – LCD Soundsystem
- "Can You Tell" – Ra Ra Riot
- "Money" – Leikeli47
- "Throw It Down" – Dominique Young Unique
- "Look at These Hoes" – Santigold
- "Wildfire" – Sbtrkt, Little Dragon
- "May" – Dizolve
- "Tomboy" – Princess Nokia
- "Bad Girls" – M.I.A.
- "F E M A L E" – Sampa the Great
- "Sonja Smokes Me Out" – Anjimile
- "288" – Anna St. Louis
- "Who Are You" – Arnetta Johnson, SunN.Y
- "Mirror" – Ider
- "Work 4 Me" – Jean Deaux feat. Kari Faux
- "Due West" – Kelsey Lu
- "Toast" – Koffee
- "More" – Mvstermind
- "Poke Bowl" – Radiant Children
- "Faraway Look" – Yola

Notes

- ^{^a} Released as a soundtrack album in vinyl editions.
