= North Trafford =

North Trafford may refer to:

- The area of Trafford, in Greater Manchester, England, which lies north of the River Mersey
- North Trafford, early name of Trafford F.C., football club in Grater Manchester, England
- North Trafford College, college which merged into Trafford College in 2007
