= Dibby Dibby Sound =

2014 single by DJ Fresh and Jay Fay

Single by DJ Fresh vs. Jay Fay featuring Ms. Dynamite
- Released: 2 February 2014
- Recorded: 2012–2013
- Genre: Moombahton; moombahcore; electro house
- Length: 3:17 (radio edit); 3:58 (extended mix)
- Label: Ministry of Sound
- Songwriter(s): Dan Stein; Niomi McLean-Daley; Joshua Fagin; Jason Pebworth; George Astasio; Jon Shave
- Producer(s): DJ Fresh; Jay Fay; The Invisible Men

DJ Fresh singles chronology
| "Earthquake" (2013) | "Dibby Dibby Sound" (2014) | "Make U Bounce" (2014) |

Jay Fay singles chronology
| "$ OOPS $" (2012) | "Dibby Dibby Sound" (2014) | "Trunk" (2015) |

Ms. Dynamite singles chronology
| "Cloud 9" (2013) | "Dibby Dibby Sound" (2014) |

"Dibby Dibby Sound" is a song by British record producer DJ Fresh and American record producer Jay Fay (whose track it is heavily based on), featuring vocals from British singer Ms. Dynamite. It was released on 2 February 2014 as the second single from his forthcoming fourth studio album. The song was written by Dan Stein, The Invisible Men, Niomi McLean-Daley and Joshua Fagin. It premiered on Zane Lowe's BBC Radio 1 show, who made it the week's Hottest Record in the World on 29 October 2013.

== Background and release ==
The song heavily samples Jay Fay's 2013 song "Dibby Dibby", featured on T&A Records' Moombahton Forever compilation album. which in turn samples "The Wickedest Sound" by Rebel MC featuring Tenor Fly. Jay reworked the song with Fresh, and Ms. Dynamite's vocals were added later. When asked, "What's your single Dibby Dibby Sound all about?" by Andrew Williams of Metro UK, Fresh responded, "It's a fun piece of music – fun is what that track stands for. Ms. Dynamite's on it. She co-wrote "Gold Dust" with me so I see it as a sequel to that. I get involved with writing – some producers send backing tracks to people and get a song sent back. That's not how I operate. The song is a really important part of the track". In addition, Fresh conducted his own "extensive research of traditional Brazilian drum beats to re-create an authentic carnival sound, re-playing and re-creating individual drum beats and sounds himself".

== Music video ==
The music video for the song was released onto Fresh's YouTube channel on 16 December 2013. It had a total length of three minutes and twenty seconds. Directed by The Sacred Egg, who had previously directed the Breach videos Jack and Everything You Never Had, the video was shot in Middlesex. The production crew built large stacks of speaker cabinets around a house.

== Critical reception ==
Lewis Corner of Digital Spy gave the song a mixed review, stating:

After 15 years in the drum 'n' bass game and having created some of the genre's most popular tunes, it's fair to say DJ Fresh ruffled a few feathers when he decided to go electro-reggae-hip-hop on last year's Diplo-assisted 'Earthquake'. He'd sold out, apparently, although he was quick to silence the cynics when we spoke to him about it, insisting: "I feel like I'm in a place where I can make whatever sort of sound I want". For his follow-up, he's teamed up with 19-year-old US producer Jay Fay and re-worked his original 'Dibby Dibby Sound' into three and a half minutes of stomping electro-bass. "Shout it out, put up your hands high," guest singer Ms Dynamite chants over a pulsing bounce before a head-spinning chorus drops that harks back to Basement Jaxx. Its immediate rush wears off soon enough, but nonetheless, this brash and bolshy piece of carnival pop is the sound of a man who's very much large and in charge..

== Track listing ==
Digital download – single
| No. | Title | Length |
|---|---|---|
| 1. | "Dibby Dibby Sound" (featuring Ms. Dynamite) | 3:17 |

Digital download – EP
| No. | Title | Length |
|---|---|---|
| 1. | "Dibby Dibby Sound" (Sigma Remix) | 4:14 |
| 2. | "Dibby Dibby Sound" (The Partysquad Remix) | 3:59 |
| 3. | "Dibby Dibby Sound" (Skitzofrenix Remix) | 4:52 |
| 4. | "Dibby Dibby Sound" (Majestic Remix) | 5:29 |
| 5. | "Dibby Dibby Sound" (Codec Remix) | 4:47 |
| 6. | "Dibby Dibby Sound" (Extended Mix) | 3:58 |
| Total length: | | 27:20 |

== Personnel ==
- Dan "Fresh" Stein – producer, instruments
- Joshua "Jay Fay" Fagin – producer, instruments
- Niomi "Ms. Dynamite" McLean-Daley – vocals
- The Invisible Men – producers

== Chart performance ==
| Chart (2014) | Peak position |
|---|---|
| Belgium (Ultratop 50 Flanders) | 23 |
| Ireland (IRMA) | 36 |
| Poland (Dance Top 50) | 30 |
| Scotland (OCC) | 3 |
| UK Dance (OCC) | 2 |
| UK Indie (OCC) | 1 |
| UK Singles (OCC) | 3 |

== Release history ==
| Region | Date | Format | Label |
|---|---|---|---|
| United Kingdom | 2 February 2014 | Digital download | Ministry of Sound |
