= Move Way =

EP by dBridge
- Released: August 16, 2013
- Genre: Electronic
- Label: R&S

Professional ratings
Aggregate scores
Source	Rating
Metacritic	70/100
Review scores
Source	Rating
XLR8R	8/10
Exclaim!	8/10

Move Way is an extended play album by electronic musician dBridge. It was released in August 2013 under R&S Records. The track Move Way uses a vocal sample taken from an interview of Pete Rock, played in the intro of his track Ready Fe War, featuring Chip Fu.

== Track listing ==
No.	Title	Length
1.	"Move Way" (featuring Skeptical)	6:19
2.	"Death of a Drum Machine"	6:02
3.	"Plain To See"	5:05
