= Pepper Rose =

Pepper Rose (formerly known as Katie Pepper and Pepper) is an English singer.

== Career ==
Pepper together with Emma Alkazraji made up the musical group known as Pepper and Piano. Pepper and Piano got to the final of the Sky talent show, Must Be the Music which was held at Wembley Arena in September 2010.

In getting to the semifinals of the show, the duo released a single entitled, "You Took My Heart", which peaked at number 7 on the UK iTunes singles chart, with another song called "One Of Those Days" reaching number 63 after the final.

Pepper was later signed by rapper Dizzee Rascal, who was a judge on the talent show, to his label Dirtee Stank in 2012. The singer had already changed her stage name to simply that of Pepper. She also incorporated more of a dubstep sound in her music.

The Dizzee Rascal song "Scream" was released as an official single for the London Olympics of 2012 and featured Pepper on vocals upon the track. The single charted at number 22 in August 2012.

At an Art for Change event in October 2014 within Chamonix, France, Pepper performed a cover of Candi Staton's "You've Got the Love".

Pepper has said she is influenced by soul and pop artists such as Dusty Springfield, Lauryn Hill, Aretha Franklin, Nina Simone and Tina Turner.

== Personal life ==
Pepper is a former student of Trafford College in Manchester. Pepper is also a fan of Arsenal F.C.
