= Lassitude (song) =

Single by Sigma and DJ Fresh featuring Koko

from the album Kryptonite
- B-side: "Cylon" (DJ Fresh vs. Sigma); "Talkbox" (Camo & Krooked remix)
- Released: 28 November 2010
- Recorded: 2010
- Genre: Drum and bass; liquid funk
- Length: 3:11 (album version); 2:43 (radio edit)
- Label: Breakbeat Kaos
- Songwriter: Dan Stein

DJ Fresh singles chronology
"Gold Dust" (2010)	"Lassitude" (2010)	"Louder" (2011)

Sigma singles chronology
"Lassitude" (2010)	"Rudeboy" (2013)

Music video
- "Lassitude" on YouTube

"Lassitude" is a song by British-based drum and bass record producers Sigma and DJ Fresh. It is the fourth and final single released from Fresh's second studio album Kryptonite. It reached number 98 on the UK Singles Chart and number 11 on the UK Dance Chart.

== Music video ==
The music video for the song was uploaded to YouTube on 4 October 2010.

== Track listings ==
Digital download
No.	Title	Length
1.	"Lassitude" (radio edit)	2:43
2.	"Lassitude" (club mix)	5:37
3.	"Cylon" (DJ Fresh vs. Sigma)	6:09
4.	"Talkbox" (Camo & Krooked remix) (by DJ Fresh)	5:11

Digital download – remixes
No.	Title	Length
1.	"Lassitude" (radio edit)	2:43
2.	"Lassitude" (club mix)	5:37
3.	"Lassitude" (Jakwob remix)	3:21
4.	"Lassitude" (Hot Pink Delorean remix)	6:31
5.	"Lassitude" (Kamuki remix)	5:41

CD single
No.	Title	Length
1.	"Lassitude" (radio edit)	2:43
2.	"Lassitude" (club mix)	5:38
3.	"Lassitude" (Jawkob remix)	4:11
4.	"Lassitude" (Hot Pink Delorean remix)	6:31
5.	"Lassitude" (Kamuki mix)	5:41
6.	"Cylon" (DJ Fresh vs. Sigma)	6:10
7.	"Talkbox" (Camo & Krooked remix) (by DJ Fresh)	5:12

== Chart performance ==
Chart (2010)	Peak position
UK Dance (Official Charts)	11
UK Indie (Official Charts)	8
UK Singles (Official Charts)	98

== Release history ==
Region	Date	Format	Label
United Kingdom	28 November 2010	12"; CD; digital download	Breakbeat Kaos
