= Kryptonite (album) =

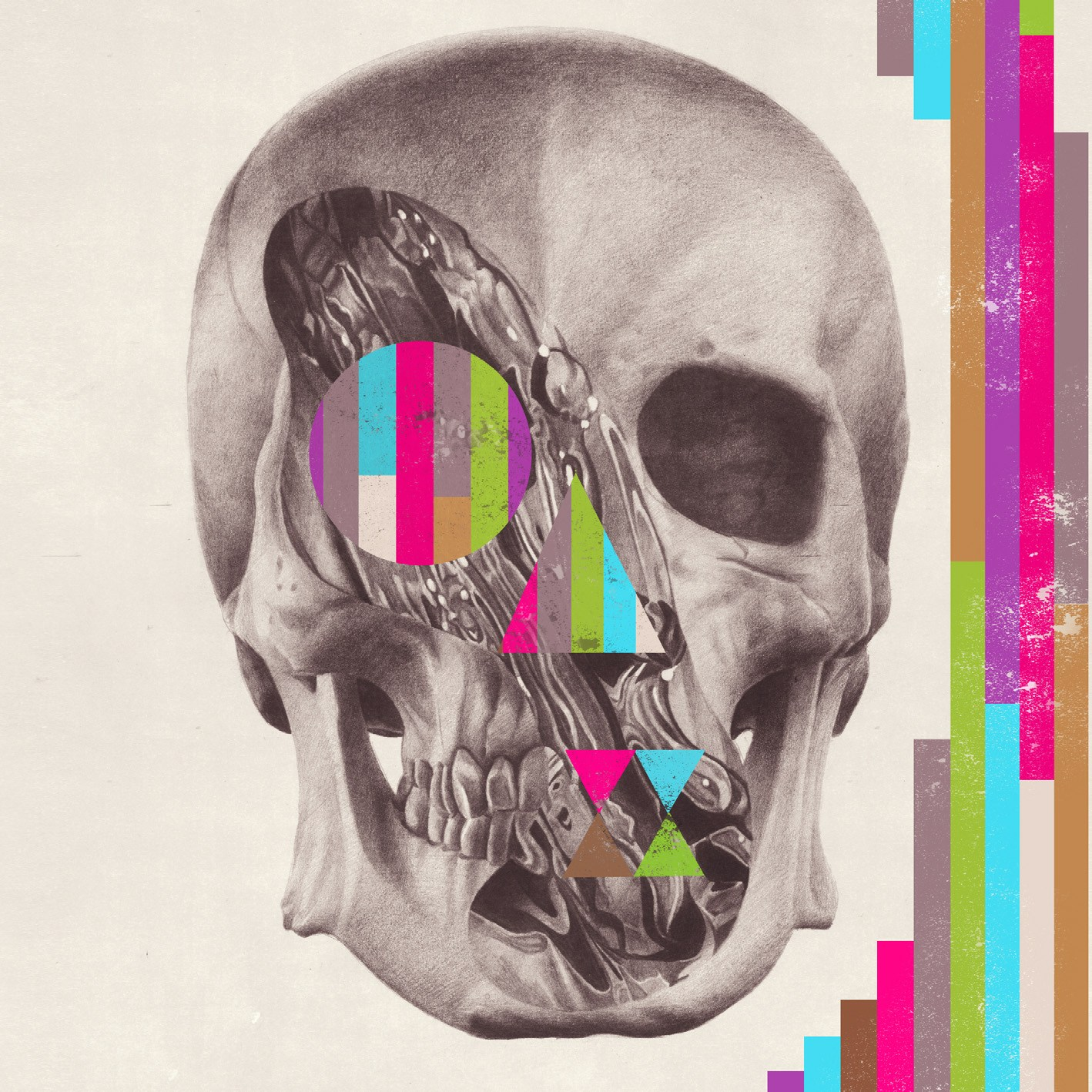

Studio album by DJ Fresh
- Released: 16 August 2010
- Recorded: 2007–10
- Genre: Drum and bass; dubstep
- Length: 45:34
- Label: Breakbeat Kaos; Data
- Producer: Dan Stein

DJ Fresh chronology
Escape from Planet Monday (2006)	Kryptonite (2010)	Nextlevelism (2012)

Singles from Kryptonite
- 1. "Heavyweight" / "Fantasia" Released: 7 September 2009 (Promo); 2. "Hypercaine" Released: 5 October 2009; 3. "Gold Dust" Released: 2 August 2010; 4. "Talkbox" / "Acid Rain" Released: 16 August 2010 (Promo); 5. "Lassitude" Released: 28 October 2010

Kryptonite is the second studio album by British-based DJ and record producer DJ Fresh. The album primarily features drum and bass tracks, featuring drum and bass group Sigma and vocalists Stamina MC, Koko, Valkyrie and Ce'cile. The album has been pushed back various times, each time with a new track or an old track removed. Tracks removed from Kryptonite are "Spaceface", a drum and bass tune removed due to Fresh losing parts of the song itself, Fresh has confirmed that he doesn't know "what's going on" with "Lazer Squad", "Off World" was put onto a 12" with "Direct Order" by The Funktion, "Cylon" became the flip to "Lassitude", and "X-Project" (VIP mix) has been removed for an unknown reason. There was a mispress of the talkbox promo vinyl which had "Acid Rain" on the flipside rather than the intended song, "Fight". Due to the public reception to the preference over "Acid Rain" than to "Fight", it ("Acid Rain") was made the official flipside rather than "Fight".

A minimix was released on 9 June, which can be found on Fresh's Myspace.

== Track listing ==
All songs written and composed by Dan Stein.

No.	Title	Length
1.	"Talkbox"	4:41
2.	"Lassitude" (with Sigma featuring Koko)	3:11
3.	"Kryptonite"	5:11
4.	"Gold Dust" (featuring Ce'cile)	3:11
5.	"Acid Rain"	5:44
6.	"Hypercaine" (featuring Stamina MC and Koko)	3:24
7.	"Starfall" (featuring Valkyrie)	5:35
8.	"Chacruna"	4:39
9.	"Fight!" (featuring Valkyrie)	4:51
10.	"Heavyweight"	5:07
Total length:		45:34

== Singles ==
- "Heavyweight" was released as the first single from the album. It was released on 7 September 2009 as a promotional single.
- "Hypercaine" was released as the album's second single. It was released on 5 October 2009 and peaked at number 12 on the UK Dance Chart.
- "Gold Dust" is the album's third single, released on 2 August 2010. It is the album's most successful single, charting on the UK Dance Chart at number six and the UK Singles Chart at number 24.
- "Lassitude" was released on 28 November 2010 as the last single from the album. It peaked at number 98 on the UK Singles Chart and at number 11 on the UK Dance Chart.

== Reception ==
Professional ratings
Review scores
Source	Rating
BBC	(Positive)
musicOMH	4.5/5 stars

Kryptonite has received generally positive reviews.

BBC commented that the album was "not as harsh as his work in Bad Company," and had the synopsis of "sticks to a tried-and-tested drum’n’bass sound, but an undeniably bouncy affair."

musicOMH rated it 4.5 out of 5 stars, and commented that "this is a high tempo stormer you should not be without."

== Charts ==
On 28 August, the album debuted on the UK Dance Albums Chart, at a current peak of number four.

Chart (2010)	Peak position
UK Dance Albums Chart	4
Chart (2011)	Peak position
UK Dance Albums Chart	39
