= Nextlevelism =

Studio album by DJ Fresh
- Released: 1 October 2012
- Recorded: 2010–12
- Genre: Drum and bass; dubstep; electro house; electronica
- Length: 37:51
- Label: Ministry of Sound
- Producer: Daniel Stein

DJ Fresh chronology
Kryptonite (2010)	Nextlevelism (2012)

Singles from Nextlevelism
- 1. "Louder" Released: 3 July 2011; 2. "Hot Right Now" Released: 13 February 2012; 3. "The Power" Released: 3 June 2012; 4. "The Feeling" Released: 23 September 2012; 5. "Gold Dust" Released: 2 December 2012

Nextlevelism is the third studio album released by drum and bass and dubstep producer DJ Fresh. The album was released in the United Kingdom on 1 October 2012. The album spawned the hit singles "Louder", "Hot Right Now", "The Power" and "The Feeling", as well as featuring "Gold Dust".

== Singles ==
- "Louder", featuring Sian Evans, was released as the lead single from the album on 3 July 2011. It peaked at No. 1 on the UK Singles Chart.
- "Hot Right Now", featuring Rita Ora, was released as the second single from the album on 13 February 2012. It also peaked at No. 1 on the UK Singles Chart.
- "The Power", featuring Dizzee Rascal, was released as the third single from the album on 3 June 2012. It peaked at No. 6 on the UK Singles Chart.
- "The Feeling", featuring RaVaughn, was released as the fourth single from the album on 23 September 2012. It peaked at No. 13 on the UK Singles Chart.
- "Gold Dust", featuring Ms. Dynamite, was released as the fifth single from the album on 2 December 2012. It peaked at No. 22 on the UK Singles Chart.

== Track listing ==
No.	Title	Writer(s)	Producer(s)	Length
1.	"Louder" (featuring Sian Evans)	Stein; Sian Evans	Stein; Sian Evans	3:26
2.	"Hot Right Now" (featuring Rita Ora)	Stein; The Invisible Men	Stein; The Invisible Men	3:02
3.	"The Feeling" (featuring RaVaughn)	Stein; The Invisible Men	Stein; The Invisible Men	3:25
4.	"Skyhighatrist" (featuring Rizzle Kicks)	Stein; The Invisible Men; Harley Alexander-Sule; Jordan Stephens	Stein; The Invisible Men	3:07
5.	"The Edge" (featuring Ayah Marar)	Stein; Ayah Marar	Stein; Ayah Marar	3:22
6.	"The Power" (featuring Dizzee Rascal)	Stein; The Invisible Men; Dylan Mills	Stein; The Invisible Men	2:47
7.	"Turn It Up" (featuring Fleur)	Stein; Fleur East; Ayah Marar	Stein; Ayah Marar	2:26
8.	"Gold Dust" (featuring Ms. Dynamite)	Stein; Norman Daley	Stein; Norman Daley	3:11
9.	"Don't Tell Me" (featuring Liam Bailey)	Stein; The Invisible Men; Liam Bailey	Stein; The Invisible Men	3:05
10.	"Fire Over Water" (featuring Juliette Lewis)	Stein; The Invisible Men; Juliette Lewis	Stein; The Invisible Men	3:40
11.	"See You Again" (with Adam F featuring Michael Warren)	Stein; Adam Fenton; Michael Warren	Stein; Adam Fenton	3:08
12.	"Forever More" (featuring The Fray and Professor Green)	Stein; The Invisible Men; Stephen Manderson	Stein; The Invisible Men	3:12
Total length:				37:55

Nextlevelism – Deluxe edition bonus tracks
No.	Title	Writer(s)	Producer(s)	Length
1.	"Louder" (Live) (featuring Sian Evans)	Stein; Sian Evans	Stein; Sian Evans	6:02
2.	"Hot Right Now" (Live) (featuring Rita Ora)	Stein; The Invisible Men	Stein; The Invisible Men	3:27
3.	"The Power" (Live) (featuring Dizzee Rascal)	Stein; The Invisible Men; Dylan Mills	Stein; The Invisible Men	4:23
4.	"Gold Dust" (Shy FX Exclusive Re-Edit)	Stein; Norman Daley	Stein; Norman Daley; Shy FX	3:27
5.	"Hot Right Now" (featuring Rita Ora) (Camo & Krooked Remix)	Stein; The Invisible Men	Stein; The Invisible Men; Camo & Krooked	4:33
6.	"The Power" (featuring Dizzee Rascal) (Andy C Remix)	Stein; The Invisible Men; Dylan Mills	Stein; The Invisible Men; Andy C	5:12
7.	"Louder" (featuring Sian Evans) (Doctor P and Flux Pavilion Remix)	Stein; Sian Evans	Stein; Sian Evans; Doctor P; Flux Pavilion	3:55
8.	"Godzilla"	Stein; The Invisible Men	Stein; The Invisible Men	4:45
Total length:				1:13:35

== Charts ==
Chart (2012)	Peak position
Irish Albums Chart	82
Scottish Albums Chart	24
UK Dance Albums Chart	1
UK Albums Chart	14

== Certifications ==
Region	Certification	Certified units/sales
United Kingdom (BPI)	Gold	100,000^{‡}
^{‡} Sales+streaming figures based on certification alone.

== Release history ==
Region	Date	Format(s)	Label	Ref.
United Kingdom	1 October 2012	CD; digital download	Ministry of Sound	
