= Bad Company (drum and bass group) =

English drum and bass group

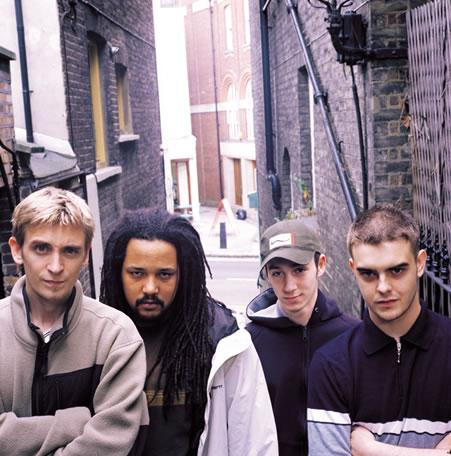
- Bad Company in 2011

Background information
- Origin: England, United Kingdom
- Genres: Drum and bass
- Years active: 1998–present
- Labels: Bad Company; Virus; Human Imprint; Prototype; Bad Taste
- Spinoff of: Absolute Zero; Future Forces Inc.
- Members: dBridge; DJ Fresh; Maldini; Vegas

Bad Company, Bad Company UK or simply BC (stylized as ᑐᗴ|ᗱᑕ) is the stage name of the English drum and bass record producers Jason Maldini (Maldini), Michael Wojcicki (Vegas), Dan Stein (DJ Fresh) and Darren White (dBridge).

The abbreviation of the name, ᑐᗴ|ᗱᑕ, is the group's logo as used on singles and album covers: the letters BC are mirrored on a vertical line (written as the letter I or as the pipe symbol |), where the reversed B looks like the number three or letter E, and the reversed C looks like an open-backed D or a right parenthesis. It is not uncommon to find the band referred to by the malaprop "DEIBC." More recent releases have doubled the upright bar of the B, resulting in ᑐᗴ||ᗱᑕ.

== History ==
They formed in 1998 as "Bad Company" from the ashes of Renegade Hardware acts Future Forces Inc (dBridge and Maldini) and Absolute Zero (DJ Fresh), although they had also worked together in various configurations: Stein, White and Maldini released The Code as Absolute Zero & Subphonics on Renegade Hardware; Stein and Wojcicki released Otto's Way as Fresh & Vegas on Metro Recordings,

The group is known in the drum and bass industry for their 12" single, "The Nine" / "The Bridge" (BCR001), which was later remastered and released again as "The Nine (Remastered)" in 2014. Bad Company went on to produce four albums and various singles which were acclaimed with similar success.

- Inside the Machine (2000)
- Digital Nation (2000)
- Shot Down on Safari (2002)
- Ice Station Zero (2018)

"Book of the Bad" (2001), a compilation album of their three Book of the Bad vinyl EPs, featuring "Miami Flashback", "Planet Dust" (originally released on Prototype Recordings), and "Mind Games".

The name Bad Company has been in disuse since about 2005, but the artists still work in the scene. Fresh had left Bad Company to pursue several solo projects under different record labels, such as Breakbeat Kaos, Ram Records, V Recordings, and Valve. D-Bridge kept producing alone as well, and started his own record label.

Maldini continued to cooperate with Vegas, recording under the name "Bad Company UK", a change which was needed because of a legal battle with the hard rock band formed in the 1970s with the same name. Their main label is Bad Taste Recordings. In 2010 the two producers formed the trio Blokhe4d along with Swiss producer Uman. Maldini and Vegas also created the Unique Artists record label, with the participation of a variety of producers from the scene.

The group had a fan forum on their website, which later became Dogs on Acid.

In 2008, readers of Knowledge Magazine voted "The Nine" as the number 1 drum and bass track of all time. Other significant tracks are "Nitrous" and "Planet Dust".

=== Comeback ===
On 8 February 2016, UKF officially announced that the group was reuniting along with the new material being released that month. They released the single Equilibrium on 25 February 2016. Two performances in Bristol and London followed in March. In June, the group gave two concerts in the United States, Las Vegas for EDC and Baltimore for 3D Productions. They also performed at several festivals, including Dour, Paradiso and Nu Forms. In August, they performed at Imagine Festival in Atlanta. They are scheduled to perform at the New Years festival Northern Bass in New Zealand.

In September 2016, they released a remix of The Prodigy's "The Day Is My Enemy" which was also uploaded onto UKF's YouTube page. The remix was nominated for the Drum & Bass Arena Awards in the category Best Remix. The single "Nomad" followed in November.

In April 2018, the group announced their first album in 16 years, Ice Station Zero, which was released at May 11, via Ram Recordings.

Since 2018 the group has continued playing live shows and going on tour. Most recently playing in February 2022, with more shows planned throughout 2022.
