= Dance with Me (Le Youth song) =

Single by Le Youth featuring Dominique Young Unique
- Released: February 7, 2014
- Recorded: 2013
- Genre: Electronica, hip hop
- Length: 2:58
- Label: Sony Music Entertainment
- Songwriters: Wes James; Dominique Clarke; Larry Blackmon; Lisa Lopes; Jermaine Dupri; Kevin Briggs; Charles Singleton; Eumir Deodato; Kandi Burruss; Shawntae Harris; Tameka Cottle; Tomi Jenkins; Robert Earl Bell; James Warren Taylor; George Melvin Brown; Robert Spike Mickens; Claydes Eugene Smith; Nathan David Leftenant; Ronald N. Bell
- Producer: Le Youth

Le Youth singles chronology
"Cool" (2013)	"Dance with Me" (2014)	"Feel Your Love" (2014)

Dominique Young Unique singles chronology
"Earthquake" (2013)	"Dance with Me" (2014)	"Throw It Down" (2014)

"Dance with Me" is a single by American electronic musician, DJ, and producer Le Youth, featuring vocals from Dominique Young Unique. The song was released in the United Kingdom as a digital download on February 7, 2014. The song was written by Wes James, Dominique Clarke, Larry Blackmon, Lisa Lopes, Jermaine Dupri, Kevin Briggs, Charles Singleton, Eumir Deodato, Kandi Burruss, Shawntae Harris, Tameka Cottle, Tomi Jenkins, Robert Earl Bell, James Warren Taylor, George Melvin Brown, Robert Spike Mickens, Claydes Eugene Smith, Nathan David Leftenant and Ronald N. Bell.

== Background ==
The songs samples TLC's hit single "No Scrubs" and Jermaine Dupri featuring Usher and Da Brat's "The Party Continues." Talking to Digital Spy about the song he said, "I knew it was getting some kind of reaction and people were going to get into and grow, but I was pretty shocked it got to the point it got".

== Music video ==
A music video to accompany the release of "Dance with Me" was first released onto YouTube on January 13, 2014 at a total length of three minutes. The video shows a number of glamorous models participate in a retro, colour co-ordinated fashion shoot.

== Critical reception ==
Robert Copsey of Digital Spy gave the song a positive review stating:

Few were more surprised at the out-of-the-blue success of Le Youth's 'Cool' last year than the artist himself. "I knew it was getting some kind of reaction," the Californian producer recently told us of the Cassie-sampling track. "But I was pretty shocked it got to the point it got." But online and radio hype aside, the fact that it only managed number 26 on the charts was, in our book, a chart travesty. For his follow-up, he's opted to sample TLC's 'No Scrubs'; a brave choice given its now iconic status in music history but also a sensible one now that we live in a time where '90s pop is old enough to become part of the revival trend. Given he's essentially repeating the trick as before it doesn't quite have the same impact as its predecessor, but crucially, its clever clipping and slinky electro grooves ensure 'Dance With Me' never once feels gimmicky.

== Track listing ==
Digital download - Single
No.	Title	Length
1.	"Dance With Me" (featuring Dominique Young Unique)	2:58

Digital download - Remixes
No.	Title	Length
1.	"Dance With Me" (featuring Dominique Young Unique) (Extended Mix)	4:40
2.	"Dance With Me" (featuring Dominique Young Unique) (MK Remix)	6:57
3.	"Dance With Me" (featuring Dominique Young Unique) (TWRK Remix)	3:57
4.	"Dance With Me" (featuring Dominique Young Unique) (Great Good Fine OK Remix)	4:23
5.	"Dance With Me" (Jacob Plant Remix)	4:43
6.	"Dance With Me" (featuring Dominique Young Unique) (Tough Love Remix)	4:13

== Chart performance ==
=== Weekly charts ===
Chart (2014)	Peak position
Ireland (IRMA)	87
Belgium (Ultratip Bubbling Under Flanders)	42
Scottish Singles Sales (Official Charts)	18
UK Dance (Official Charts)	6
UK Singles (Official Charts)	11

== Release history ==
Region	Date	Format	Label
United Kingdom	February 7, 2014	Digital download	Sony Music Entertainment
