= The Feeling (DJ Fresh song) =

Single by DJ Fresh featuring RaVaughn

from the album Nextlevelism
- Released: 23 September 2012
- Recorded: 2012
- Genre: Drum and bass
- Length: 3:25
- Label: Ministry of Sound
- Songwriter: Daniel Stein
- Producer: Daniel Stein

DJ Fresh singles chronology
"The Power" (2012)	"The Feeling" (2012)	"Gold Dust" (2012)

Music video
- "The Feeling" on YouTube

"The Feeling" is a single by English disc jockey DJ Fresh, released as the fourth single from his album Nextlevelism. RaVaughn is the main vocalist. It was released on 23 September 2012 in the United Kingdom as a digital download on iTunes.

== Music video ==
The music video was produced in Japan and was directed by Ivan Oglivie. Everyone is riding mopeds that are relatively futuristic. The basis for the music video is about youth and fulfilment thus the title "The Feeling" as in a feeling of ecstasy which is a familiar theme throughout the music video.

== Track listings ==
Digital download
No.	Title	Length
1.	"The Feeling" (radio edit)	3:25
2.	"The Feeling" (Metrik remix)	4:11
3.	"The Feeling" (Bobby Tank remix)	4:29
4.	"The Feeling" (Utah Saints remix)	6:30
5.	"The Feeling" (Julian Jordan remix)	5:34
6.	"The Feeling" (extended mix)	4:52

Remixes EP
No.	Title	Length
1.	"The Feeling" (Hadouken! remix)	5:11
2.	"The Feeling" (South Central remix)	4:12
3.	"The Feeling" (The Young Punx vocal mix)	6:40

CD single
No.	Title	Length
1.	"The Feeling" (radio edit)	3:25
2.	"The Feeling" (Metrik remix)	4:11
3.	"The Feeling" (Bobby Tank remix)	4:29
4.	"The Feeling" (Utah Saints remix)	6:30
5.	"The Feeling" (Julian Jordan remix)	5:34
6.	"The Feeling" (extended mix)	4:52
7.	"The Feeling" (South Central remix)	4:12
8.	"The Feeling" (The Young Punx vocal mix)	6:40
9.	"The Feeling" (instrumental edit)	3:26

== Chart performance ==
Chart (2012)	Peak position
Belgium (Ultratop 50 Flanders)	40
Romania (Romanian Top 100)	76
Scottish Singles Sales (Official Charts)	16
UK Dance (Official Charts)	3
UK Indie (Official Charts)	2
UK Singles (Official Charts)	13

== Release history ==
Region	Date	Format	Label
United Kingdom	23 September 2012	Digital download	Ministry of Sound
