= Jay Fay =

- Birth name: Joshua Fagin
- Origin: St. Louis, Missouri, United States
- Genres: Dance
- Occupations: Record producer; DJ
- Years active: 2012–present
- Labels: T&A Records
- Website: jayfaymusic.com

Joshua Fagin, better known by his stage name Jay Fay, is an American DJ and producer from St. Louis, Missouri. He released his debut EP Bonkers in February 2012. He is best known for featuring on DJ Fresh's 2014 single "Dibby Dibby Sound", a track which was initially based on Jay Fay's solo single "Dibby Dibby".

== Career ==
=== 2012–present: Breakthrough ===
On 14 February 2012 he released his debut EP Bonkers. On 3 April 2012 he released his second EP $$ OOPS $$. In February 2014 he released the single "Dibby Dibby Sound" with DJ Fresh featuring vocals from English singer Ms. Dynamite. The song heavily samples Jay Fay's 2013 song "Dibby Dibby", featured on T&A Records' Moombahton Forever compilation album. Jay reworked the song with Fresh, and Ms. Dynamite's vocals were later added.

== Discography ==
=== Extended plays ===
Title	EP details
Bonkers	Released: 14 February 2012; Label: Young Robots; Format: Digital download
$$ OOPS $$	Released: 3 April 2012; Label: T&A Records; Format: Digital download

=== Singles ===
==== As featured artist ====
Title	Year	Peak chart positions				Album
Title	Year	BEL (Vl)	SCO	UK	UK Dance	Album
"Dibby Dibby Sound"^{[A]} (DJ Fresh vs. Jay Fay featuring Ms. Dynamite)	2014	40	3	3	2	TBA
"Trunk" (signal:noise & Jay Fay)	2015	–	–	–	–	Non-album single

=== Other appearances ===
Song	Year	Release	Label
"Dibby Dibby"	2013	Moombahton Forever	T&A Records

=== Remixes ===
Song	Year	Original Artist(s)
"Uncrushable"	2012	Bro Safari
"Tira o Pé"	2012	Buraka Som Sistema
"Baby, I Love You"	2012	Bailey Smalls
"Tonight"	2012	Felix Cartal featuring Maja Ivarsson
"Selekta"	2012	Craze
"Ladies in the Back"	2012	Star Slinger
"Velma Kelly"	2012	Faux No
"These Things are Nice"	2012	The Hood Internet
"Kingpin"	2013	Friction and Skream featuring Scrufizzer, P Money and Riko Dan
"Outlaw"	2013	Amplify Dot
