= Throw It Down =

Single by Dominique Young Unique
- Released: 21 March 2014
- Recorded: 2013
- Genre: Hip hop, trap
- Length: 3:16
- Label: Sony Music Entertainment
- Songwriter(s): Dominique Clark; Daniel Stein; Adegbenga Adejumo; Jon Shave; Jason Pebworth; George Astasio
- Producer(s): DJ Fresh; Benga; The Invisible Men

Dominique Young Unique singles chronology
"Dance with Me" (2014)	"Throw It Down" (2014)

"Throw It Down" is a song by American rapper and model Dominique Young Unique. The song was released in the United Kingdom on 21 March 2014 as a digital download. The song has charted in Belgium. The song was written by Dominique Clark and produced by DJ Fresh, Benga and The Invisible Men.

== Music video ==
A music video to accompany the release of "Throw It Down" was first released onto YouTube on 16 March 2014 at a total length of three minutes and eighteen seconds.

== Track listing ==
Digital download – single
No.	Title	Length
1.	"Throw It Down"	3:16

== Chart performance ==
=== Weekly charts ===
Chart (2014)	Peak position
Belgium (Ultratip Bubbling Under Flanders)	45

== Release history ==
Region	Date	Format	Label
United Kingdom	21 March 2014	Digital download	Sony Music Entertainment
