= Dogs On Acid =

UK-based music website

- The DOA homepage
- Website type: Portal
- Available in: English
- Owners: Vexus & Rezpkt (previously Sacha, Adam F, DJ Fresh and Grooverider)
- Creator: Bad Company
- Website: dogsonacid.com
- Commercial: Yes
- Registration: Yes
- Launched: 29 January 2001

Dogs On Acid, also known as DOA, is a UK-based drum and bass and electronic music website established in 2001.

== History ==
Dogs On Acid started on Bad Company's website, bcrecordings.com in 2000. On 27 April 2010, the website reached 10 million posts from the forums, with almost 9 million posts on The Board and over a million on The Grid.

On 23 September 2013, the forum was taken offline. In January 2014, the site was relaunched under new ownership, with updated design and servers.

=== Relaunch ===
The domain was sold to a new owner "Vexus". On 10 January 2014, a placeholder page appeared on the original domain, stating that the site would be "Renamed. Rebranded. Relaunched". The Facebook account repeated the message on the website, whereas the Twitter account had the message "RIP DOA". However, in late January, the site was relaunched under the name "Mixspace", sporting a new design, but keeping the existing forums and database. Due to the Dogs On Acid branding being more popular, the site soon reverted to its original name.

=== Present forum ===
The website features an Editorial section, stores selling merchandise and—in cooperation with Track It Down—online music downloads, an image gallery, an online radio and an audio section, showcasing the latest tracks from the scene. The Grid, the website's music production section, is the birthplace of many new D&B talent. Regular contributors included Noisia, Pendulum, Alix Perez, and Danny Byrd before gaining any mainstream popularity; additionally, most D&B artists and promoters are regular contributors to the community. Dogs On Acid also runs various music labels: Breakbeat Kaos, Dogs On Acid and Under Construction and promotes and organises various parties worldwide.

The Grid, documenting production techniques, holds monthly Q&A Sessions with notable producers and artists. Members of The Grid can also collaborate to the 'Grid Wiki'. Mary Anne Hobbs announced during an interview "Everything happens on-line [sic]. The forums and the bloggers are running things - dubstepforum.com and dogsonacid.com are phenomenal".

== Notable events ==
Dogs On Acid's competitors are Drum & Bass Arena. Both production sub-forums compete against each other for best track and mixes.

=== Pendulum ===
Around being signed to Breakbeat Kaos (BBK), drum and bass group Pendulum was active on DOA. During the same time, DOA became the first board to get hit with any news of their releases, also causing the group to be hit with many questions on the production side. Following the success of Pendulum's Slam and Hold Your Colour, Fresh decided to release a compilation CD entitled Jungle Sound Gold Edition. Pendulum responded to the thread stating they had no idea about the release nor gave any permission. Rob Swire responded by admitting no knowledge of the album's release, and that it had nothing to do with the band. Swire also stated they gave Fresh & Adam F low quality tracks to be used for a set and not for releases.

We didn't approve and in fact strongly disapprove of the 'Junglesound Gold' artwork, especially in relation to our name being unfairly used as an advertisement – plainly an attempt to link 'Junglesound Gold' to the recent success of Hold Your Colour.

As a result of the above, we do not endorse 'Junglesound Gold' at all.
– Pendulum

This is one of the few threads that caused uproar within the forum and gained over a thousand replies & 141,000 views in the space of four weeks from Rob's post. News of the scandal spread quickly, even being mentioned on Radio 1's Drum & Bass show only a week later. Fresh was also accused by various members for deviously capitalizing on Pendulum's sudden success. Since the incident, Fresh gave his statement (although by this point the CD was out) and Pendulum left the label. On 18 June 2007, Fresh released Pendulum's last 12" single: Blood Sugar / Axle Grinder along with a special edition ‘Hold Your Colour’ CD.

Although Pendulum (which at that time included Rob Swire, Paul Harding and Gareth McGrillen) felt the forum began to become negative and cut ends with BBK & Fresh, they continued posting on the portal. Once the track "Granite" was released, Pendulum became ridiculed by various members for their change in style and being accused of "selling out" for mainstream success. Although the album was highly successful the band continued to receive heavy sarcasm and accusations for killing the genre from various members, described by the board as "haters". Pendulum responded by saying "if we 'killed drum and bass' last time, this is the final nail in its coffin." As the album continued to do well in the mainstream (including Propane Nightmares peaking at #9 in the UK Singles Chart), the band continued to be criticised by DnB enthusiasts, to the point where in March 2009 the band were booed at the Drum and Bass awards from certain enthusiasts for "selling out" and "sounding more rock and having a different style to their preceding album". After receiving a heavy amount of criticism, Pendulum decided to respond one more time and left the forum indefinitely.

== Accolades ==
- Nominated for Best Website at the Accelerated Culture Awards 2003, 2nd place
- Nominated for Best Website at the BBC XtraBass Awards 2007, 2nd place
- Mentioned in the July 2008 issue of KMag as one of "the top 100 most important moments in Drum & Bass"
- Nominated for Best Music Forum during MTV's second annual Online Music Awards, 2011

== See also ==
- Drum and bass
- Jungle music
