= DBridge =

English drum and bass record producer

dBridge
- Also known as: Velvit
- Born: Darren White
- Origin: England
- Genres: Drum and bass, electronic, techno
- Years active: 1994–present
- Label: Exit Records (UK)

dBridge, also known as Velvit (born Darren White), is an English drum and bass record producer whose career began during the genre's conception in the early 1990s. dBridge was part of the duo Future Forces Inc., a project made with DJ Maldini, with releases on the record label Renegade Hardware. Later, they joined Fresh and Vegas to form the drum and bass supergroup Bad Company, of which dBridge was a member of during the late 1990s and early 2000s. During his time with Bad Company, they released the tracks "Planet Dust", "Nitrous", and "The Nine".

dBridge released his first solo album, The Gemini Principle, in 2008. dBridge owns his own record imprint, Exit Records. In 2011, Exit released a compilation called Mosaic Vol 1. Mosaic Vol 2 followed in 2013. In 2013 he collaborated with Kid Drama on Heart Drive, a project consisting of a series of podcasts previewing autonomic tracks from the duo. Also in 2013, he released the EP Move Way on the R&S Records label. dBridge started creating techno and house music in 2015 under the alias Velvit. Other projects of his include collaborations with producers Instra:mental (see autonomic podcasts), Fierce, Break, Survival, Calibre, and Skream.
