= Cool (Le Youth song) =

Single by Le Youth
- Released: June 28, 2013
- Recorded: 2012/13
- Genre: Electronica, house
- Length: 3:34
- Label: Sony Music Entertainment; Ultra Records
- Songwriter(s): Ryan Leslie; Wes James

Le Youth singles chronology
"Cool" (2013)	"Dance with Me" (2014)

"Cool" (stylized as "C O O L") is the debut single by American electronic musician, DJ, and producer Le Youth. The song was released in the United Kingdom as a digital download on June 28, 2013 and in the United States on July 2, 2013. The song has peaked to number 26 on the UK Singles Chart and number 19 on the Danish Singles Chart. The song heavily samples Cassie's song "Me & U". It rapidly received over 200,000 plays on SoundCloud in a short period of time.

== Music video ==
A music video to accompany the release of "Cool" was first released onto YouTube on April 10, 2013 at a total length of three minutes and thirty-four seconds.

== Track listing ==
No.	Title	Length
1.	"Cool"	3:34
2.	"Cool" (ColeCo Remix)	6:38
3.	"Cool" (Lane 8 Remix)	4:57
4.	"Cool" (Henry Krinkle Remix)	5:20
5.	"Cool" (Nate Goldsmith Remix)	4:05
6.	"Cool" (Ben Pearce Remix)	6:33

== Chart performance ==
=== Weekly charts ===
Chart (2013)	Peak position
Belgium (Ultratip Bubbling Under Flanders)	10
Belgium Dance (Ultratop)	11
Denmark (Tracklisten)	19
Scotland (OCC)	28
UK Dance (OCC)	8
UK Singles (OCC)	26

=== Year-end charts ===
Chart (2013)	Position
UK Singles (Official Charts Company)	187

== Certifications ==
Region	Certification	Certified units/sales
United Kingdom (BPI)	Silver	200,000^{‡}
Streaming
Denmark (IFPI Danmark)	Gold	900,000^{†}
^{‡} Sales+streaming figures based on certification alone.^{†} Streaming-only figures based on certification alone.

== Release history ==
Region	Date	Format	Label
United Kingdom	June 28, 2013	Digital download	Sony Music Entertainment
United States	July 2, 2013	Digital download	Ultra Records
