= Le Youth =

- Born: Wes James; 1983 (age 42–43); Toledo, Ohio, United States
- Origin: Los Angeles, California, United States
- Genres: Electronica; house; alternative dance; nu-disco; deep house
- Years active: 2012–present
- Labels: Sony; Epic
- Website: leyouth.com

Wes James, better known by his stage name Le Youth, is an American electronic musician, DJ, and producer. James was raised in Toledo, Ohio and currently resides in Los Angeles, California.

== Music career ==
=== Breakthrough ===
Le Youth's debut track "Cool" quickly garnered attention on SoundCloud, amassing over 200,000 streams in the six months following its release. The music video for the song was directed by Renata Raksha and was released on April 9, 2013. The single was officially released on Ultra on July 2, 2013, and was later selected as the Record of the Week on BBC Radio 1. James' next single "Dance with Me" featuring vocals from Dominique Young Unique was released on February 7, 2014.

Le Youth continued to release R&B and house-inspired songs in the years following, including remixes of popular tracks like Disclosure's "Voices" and originals like "Real".

=== Homewerk Label and Tour, Continued Success ===
On October 7, 2016, Le Youth released "Me Without You" on his own label, Homewerk Records. James cited the label's launch as a way of taking control of his music, particularly with respect to release schedules. "If You're Leaving" also released later that year on Homewerk, reaching number one on Sirius XM's Chill playlist. The accompanying Homewerk Tour saw the artist perform at 13 venues in North America.

By 2017, Le Youth had released remixes of songs by popular singers such as Katy Perry, Christina Aguilera, and Sia. On August 4 of that year, "Clap Your Hands" released on Warner Music, featuring then-unknown Ava Max.

=== This Never Happened, PRGRSSN, and Debut Album ===
The release of Aquiver on November 7, 2019 marked a significant sonic shift in Le Youth's discography. The instrumental record was both inspired by and released on Daniel Goldstein's (Lane 8) This Never Happened label. James hailed the deeper melodic techno and progressive sounds as his best work to date.

On July 9, 2020, Le Youth released his second EP on This Never Happened, Waves. Collaboration with Lane 8 continued with a remix of "The Rope (feat. POLIÇA)" and a support role in Goldstein's Brightest Lights Tour.

The PRGRSSN Records imprint was founded by James in 2020 to further explore progressive house and techno sounds. The first release on PRGRSSN came on April 17, 2020 with Interstellar by thomfjord and featured a remix of the title track by Le Youth. On May 14, tracks "Swimming" and "&." followed, marking Le Youth's first release on his new label. PRGRSSN released records from James and other artists through 2022.

Le Youth released his debut album, Reminders, on May 27, 2022. Split into two discs, the former contains fifteen original mixes while the latter comprises four extended mixes. The album features collaborations with fellow melodic house producers such as Sultan & Shepard.

=== Sophomore Album, & EP ===
Le Youth released his sophomore album About Us on September 29, 2023. Inspired by a run of crowd-focused live shows in 2022, James expressed his desire to capture a "spectrum of emotions" with the album, with some tracks "[moving] you emotionally" and others "moving the dance floor." About Us [Deluxe] was released on March 15, 2024, and included 8 remixes of 7 songs from the album.

Like About Us, Le Youth referenced one of his previous songs when he released & (EP) on October 11, 2024. This collaboration-focused record was designed to "shine a spotlight" on some of James' favorite up and coming artists; Otherwish, MYRNE, and Robby East were among the names to feature on the EP and have gone on to release music on the This Never Happened label.

== Discography ==
=== Singles ===
Title	Year	Peak chart positions					Album
Title	Year	BEL (FL)	DEN	IRE	SCO	UK	Album
"Cool"	2013	—^{[A]}	19	—	28	26	Non-Album Singles
"Dance with Me" (featuring Dominique Young Unique)	2014	—^{[B]}	—	87	18	11	Non-Album Singles
"Feel Your Love" (featuring Javeon)	2014	—	—	—	—	146	Non-Album Singles
"Girl"	2014	—	—	—	—	—	Non-Album Singles
"Real"	2015	—	—	—	—	—	Non-Album Singles
"Touch"	2015	—	—	—	—	—	Non-Album Singles
"Me Without You" (featuring Tay Beckham)	2016	—	—	—	—	—	Non-Album Singles
"Boomerang" (featuring Tay Beckham)	2016	—	—	—	—	—	Non-Album Singles
"If You're Leaving" (featuring Sydnie)	2016	—	—	—	—	—	Non-Album Singles
"Walk Away"	2017	—	—	—	—	—	Non-Album Singles
"Clap Your Hands"	2017	—	—	—	—	—	Non-Album Singles
"I Could Always" (featuring MNDR)	2017	—	—	—	—	—	Non-Album Singles
"Stay" (featuring Karen Harding)	2018	—	—	—	—	—	Non-Album Singles
"Selfish" (with Samana)	2019	—	—	—	—	—	Non-Album Singles
"Obvious" (with Adam Rom)	2020	—	—	—	—	—	Non-Album Singles
"About Us" (featuring EMME)	2020	—	—	—	—	—	Non-Album Singles
"Gemini"	2020	—	—	—	—	—	Gemini / Arizona
"Arizona"	2020	—	—	—	—	—	Gemini / Arizona
"Rise"	2020	—	—	—	—	—	Rise / Unattached
"Unattached"	2020	—	—	—	—	—	Rise / Unattached
"Other Voices"	2020	—	—	—	—	—	Underwater / Other Voices
"Underwater"	2020	—	—	—	—	—	Underwater / Other Voices
"Home Away From Home" (with OCULA featuring Karra)	2020	—	—	—	—	—	Non-Album Singles
"Skipping Stones" (with Sultan & Shepard)	2021	—	—	—	—	—	Non-Album Singles
"Miraje"	2021	—	—	—	—	—	Non-Album Singles
"Virgo"	2021	—	—	—	—	—	Non-Album Singles
"Empire" (with OCULA featuring Møøne)	2021	—	—	—	—	—	Non-Album Singles
"Lullaby" (with Anakim featuring Linney)	2022	—	—	—	—	—	Non-Album Singles
"Lighthouse" (featuring RBBTS)	2022	—	—	—	—	—	Reminders
"Pattern" (with Sultan & Shepard featuring Emily Falvey)	2022	—	—	—	—	—	Reminders
"Dreaming" (featuring Tailor)	2022	—	—	—	—	—	Reminders
"Hang On" (featuring Gordi)	2022	—	—	—	—	—	Reminders
"Chills"	2022	—	—	—	—	—	Chills / Cycles
"Cycles"	2022	—	—	—	—	—	Chills / Cycles
"Lost" (with Jerro featuring Lizzy Land)	2023	—	—	—	—	—	Non-Album Singles
"Hologram" (featuring LeyeT)	2023	—	—	—	—	—	Non-Album Singles
"Protocol" (with Hessian featuring Able Joseph)	2023	—	—	—	—	—	Non-Album Singles
"Like You Did	2023	—	—	—	—	—	About Us
"I Will Leave a Light On" (with Lane 8 featuring Jyll)	2023	—	—	—	—	—	About Us
"Talking Like That" (featuring EMME)	2023	—	—	—	—	—	About Us
"I Don't Mind" (featuring Kairos Grove)	2023	—	—	—	—	—	About Us
"Paradise" (featuring Oaks)	2024	—	—	—	—	—	About Us [Deluxe]
"Stay Still" (with Forester featuring Lyrah)	2024	—	—	—	—	—	Non-Album Single
"every-little-part" (with Otherwish featuring LeyeT)	2024	—	—	—	—	—	&
"golden" (with MYRNE featuring Bertie Scott)	2024	—	—	—	—	—	&
"seven-twenty-four" (with Robby East)	2024	—	—	—	—	—	&
"i don't know what to say" (with Lipless featuring Hana Fatur)	2025	—	—	—	—	—	who are you really?
"still my ecstasy" (featuring Ella Poletti)	2025	—	—	—	—	—	who are you really?
"sanctuary" (featuring ALLKNIGHT)	2025	—	—	—	—	—	who are you really?
"blinded" (featuring Orem)	2026	—	—	—	—	—	who are you really?
"alone" (with Forester featuring Robertson)	2026	—	—	—	—	—	who are you really?
"—" denotes a recording that did not chart or was not released in that territory.

=== Albums ===
Title	Year
Reminders	2022
Reminders Remixed	2022
About Us	2023
About Us [Deluxe]	2024
who are you really?	2026

=== EPs ===
Title	Year
Dance With Me (Remixes)	2014
Me Without You (Remixes)	2016
Boomerang (Remixes)	2016
If You're Leaving (Remixes)	2016
Aquiver	2019
Swimming/&.	2020
Waves	2020
Gemini / Arizona	2020
Rise / Unattached	2020
Underwater / Other Voices	2020
Colour	2021
Underwater - Remixes	2021
Chills / Cycles	2022
&	2024
