= Scream (Dizzee Rascal song) =

Single by Dizzee Rascal featuring Pepper
- Released: 5 August 2012
- Recorded: 2012
- Genre: Dance
- Length: 4:20
- Label: Dirtee Stank, Island Records
- Songwriter(s): Dizzee Rascal, Pepper, Nick Cage, Musical D, Teriy Keys
- Producer(s): Nick Cage, Musical D,

Dizzee Rascal singles chronology
"The Power" (2012)	"Scream" (2012)	"Wild" (2013)

Pepper singles chronology
"Scream" (2012)

"Scream" is a song by the English rapper, MC, songwriter and record producer Dizzee Rascal, featuring vocals from Pepper. The song was produced by Musical D and Nick Cage and is the first single released from his fifth studio album. It was announced on that "Scream" would serve as one of the official songs for the London 2012 Olympics.

== Background ==
It was announced on 25 July 2012 that the song would serve as one of five official tracks for the London 2012 Olympics. The song had been demo-ed by Smurfie Syco before finally featuring vocals from Pepper, who has performed with him a handful of times following their first collaboration at last year's V Festival. Pepper was signed to his Dirtee Skank record label after she was discovered on Must Be the Music, where Dizzee appeared as a vocal judge.

== Music video ==
The music video for the song was uploaded to YouTube on 26 July 2012 at a length of two minutes and thirty-seven seconds.

== Critical reception ==
Robert Copsey of Digital Spy gave the song a mixed review stating:

"I feel like Rocky on the steps/ I could have drowned in the blood and the sweat," he insists over punchy beats, swooping strings and twinky electro-swizzles, his flow still packing a considerable punch. As with most sports songs this summer it's not the most lyrically adventurous ("Scream it from your heart/ Feel it from your soul," guest star Pepper sings on the chorus), but as a rousing stadium-filler, it does the job nicely..

== Track listings ==
Digital download
No.	Title	Length
1.	"Scream" (Radio Edit)	2:36
2.	"Scream"	4:20

== Charts ==
Chart (2012)	Peak Position
Scotland (OCC)	22
UK Singles (OCC)	22
UK Dance (OCC)	6

== Release history ==
Region	Date	Format	Label
United Kingdom	5 August 2012	Digital download	Dirtee Stank, Island Records
