= Trafford College =

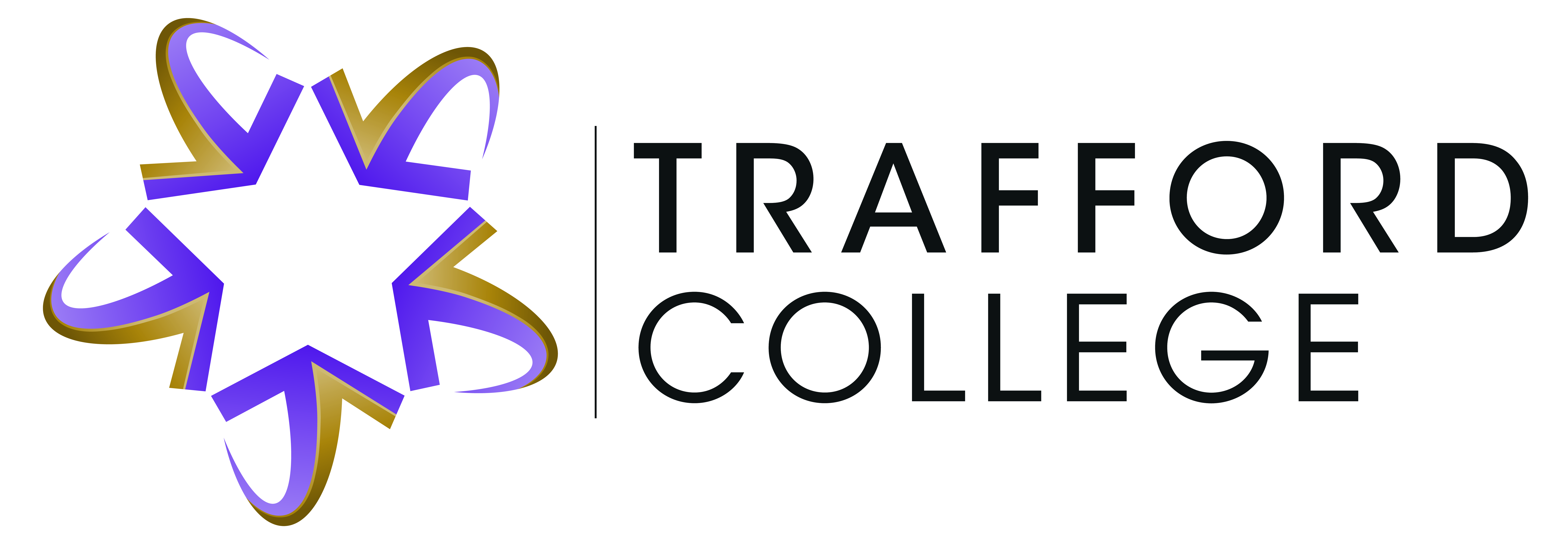
- Trafford, Greater Manchester; England

Information
- Type: Further Education
- Established: 2007
- Local authority: Trafford
- Ofsted: Reports
- Gender: Mixed
- Website: Official website

Trafford College is a further education college in Trafford, Greater Manchester, England. It was formed with the merger of North Trafford College (formerly Stretford Technical College, founded 1974) and South Trafford College (founded 1951) in 2007.

== Campuses and facilities ==
Trafford College has two campuses; Altrincham Campus and Stretford Campus, the main sites of the original colleges before the merging, as well as a Skills Shop based at the Trafford Centre.

Altrincham Campus offers A-Levels and vocational courses in business and accountancy, childcare, creative arts and media, foundation learning, beauty and hairdressing, health and social care, hospitality, IT and computing, sport, uniformed services, tourism and aviation. On-site facilities include a fitness suite, a beauty salon and spa, a restaurant bar, and a café.

Stretford Campus is STEM Assured and has engineering and motor vehicle workshops, an industrial robot, science labs, AMC and AM2 training centres, and other specialist teaching facilities. The campus offers vocational courses in electrical installation, electronics, engineering, engineering services for buildings, foundation learning, gas, motor vehicles, plumbing, and science. The campus also offers A Levels in applied science, biology, chemistry, English, mathematics, physics and psychology.

The Skills Shop, based at the Trafford Centre, offers training programmes to young people in retail, hospitality and customer service. This hub also provides employers with staff development and training.

== Notable alumni ==
- Morrissey
- Jason Orange
- Pepper Rose
- John Squire
- Ian Brown
- Carly Tait
