= Believer (DJ Fresh and Adam F song) =

Single by DJ Fresh & Adam F
- Released: 7 June 2015
- Recorded: 2014–2015
- Genre: Breakbeat
- Length: 3:01
- Label: Ministry of Sound
- Songwriters: Adam Fenton; Dan Stein; Ray Keith
- Producers: Adam Fenton; Dan Stein

DJ Fresh singles chronology
"Gravity" (2015)	"Believer" (2015)	"How Love Begins" (2016)

Adam F singles chronology
"The Pit" (2013)	"Believer" (2015)	"Harmony" (2016)

"Believer" is a single by English drum and bass producer DJ Fresh and English record producer and DJ Adam F. The song was released as a digital download on 7 June 2015 through Ministry of Sound as the sixth single from Fresh's forthcoming fourth studio album. The song peaked at 58 on the UK Singles Chart. The song was written by Adam Fenton, Dan Stein and Ray Keith.

== Music video ==
A music video to accompany the release of "Believer" was first released onto YouTube on 30 April 2015 at a total length of three minutes and fifteen seconds.

== Track listing ==
Digital download - Single
No.	Title	Length
1.	"Believer" (Radio Edit)	3:01

Digital download - EP
No.	Title	Length
1.	"Believer" (Adam F & DJ Fresh BBK Edit)	3:09
2.	"Believer" (David Zowie Remix)	5:07
3.	"Believer" (MJ Cole Remix)	5:41
4.	"Believer" (Jacob Plant Remix)	4:42

== Chart performance ==
=== Weekly charts ===
Chart (2015)	Peak position
UK Singles (OCC)	58
UK Dance (OCC)	14
UK Indie (OCC)	3

== Release history ==
Region	Date	Format	Label
United Kingdom	7 June 2015	Digital download	Ministry of Sound
