= Earthquake (DJ Fresh and Diplo song) =

2013 single by DJ Fresh and Diplo

Single by DJ Fresh vs. Diplo featuring Dominique Young Unique
- Released: 18 August 2013
- Recorded: 2013
- Genre: Trap; moombahton
- Length: 3:09
- Label: Ministry of Sound
- Songwriter(s): Daniel Stein; Thomas Wesley Pentz
- Producer(s): DJ Fresh; Diplo

DJ Fresh singles chronology
| "Gold Dust" (2012) | "Earthquake" (2013) | "Dibby Dibby Sound" (2014) |

Diplo singles chronology
| "P.O.V. 2.0" (2013) | "Earthquake" (2013) | "Boy Oh Boy" (2013) |

Dominique Young Unique singles chronology
| "Pushing" (2013) | "Earthquake" (2013) | "Dance with Me" (2014) |

"Earthquake" is a single by British disc jockey DJ Fresh and American counterpart Diplo featuring vocals from Dominique Young Unique. The song was released in the United Kingdom on 18 August 2013 as the lead single from his fourth studio album. An edited version of the song with extra production and sound effects features in the film Kick-Ass 2, under the name "Motherquake". It contains a sample from the song "Teach Me How to Dougie" by the hip hop group Cali Swag District. "Earthquake" peaked at number four on the UK Singles Chart, number three on the UK Dance Chart and topped the UK Indie Chart.

The debut performance of "Earthquake" occurred during DJ Fresh's set at the New York leg of the international Electric Daisy Carnival festival. Dominique and DJ Fresh performed "Earthquake" again at Radio 1's Big Weekend, during the latter's headlining set on the "1Xtra Arena/In New Music We Trust Stage". DJ Fresh and Dominique Young Unique performed the track live on 4Music panel show 'McFlurry Music Mix Up' presented by Rickie and Melvin on 19 August 2013.

== Music video ==
A music video to accompany the release of "Earthquake" was first released onto YouTube on 24 July 2013 at a total length of three minutes and twenty seconds. The music video was directed by Jonas & François and filmed in New York City. It features DJ Fresh, Diplo and Dominique Young Unique.

== Track listings ==
Digital download
| No. | Title | Length |
|---|---|---|
| 1. | "Earthquake" (Edit) (Clean) | 3:10 |
| 2. | "Earthquake" (TC Remix) (Explicit) | 3:47 |
| 3. | "Earthquake" (Vato Gonzalez and Jaguar Skills Remix) (Explicit) | 4:23 |
| 4. | "Earthquake" (Delta Heavy Remix) (Explicit) | 3:52 |
| 5. | "Earthquake" (Astronomar Remix) (Explicit) | 3:36 |
| 6. | "Earthquake" (The Golden Boy Remix) (Clean) | 5:52 |
| 7. | "Earthquake" (WestFunk and Steve Smart Club Mix) (Clean) | 4:22 |

"Motherquake" (Kick-Ass 2 version) download
| No. | Title | Length |
|---|---|---|
| 1. | "Motherquake" (DJ Fresh vs. Diplo featuring Dominique Young Unique) (Explicit) | 2:08 |

Remix EP
| No. | Title | Length |
|---|---|---|
| 1. | "Earthquake" (Shy FX Remix) (Explicit) | 3:36 |
| 2. | "Earthquake" (DJ Riot's Zouk Bass Remix) (Explicit) | 4:07 |
| 3. | "Earthquake" (Extended Mix) (Explicit) | 4:20 |

Eat, Sleep, Rave, Repeat - Ministry of Sound [Explicit] MP3-Album download
| No. | Title | Length |
|---|---|---|
| 1. | "Earthquake" (Extended Edit) (Explicit) | 10:08 |

== Chart performance ==
=== Weekly charts ===
| Chart (2013) | Peak position |
|---|---|
| Ireland (IRMA) | 42 |
| Scotland (OCC) | 6 |
| UK Singles (OCC) | 4 |
| UK Dance (OCC) | 3 |
| UK Indie (OCC) | 1 |
| US Hot Dance/Electronic Songs (Billboard) | 26 |

=== Year-end charts ===
| Chart (2013) | Position |
|---|---|
| UK Singles (OCC) | 104 |
| Chart (2014) | Position |
| US Hot Dance/Electronic Songs (Billboard) | 94 |

== Certifications ==
Certifications for "Earthquake"
| Region | Certification | Certified units/sales |
|---|---|---|
| United Kingdom (BPI) | Silver | 200,000^{‡} |
^{‡} Sales+streaming figures based on certification alone.

== Release history ==
| Region | Date | Format | Label |
|---|---|---|---|
| United Kingdom | 18 August 2013 | Digital download | Ministry of Sound |
