= Escape from Planet Monday =

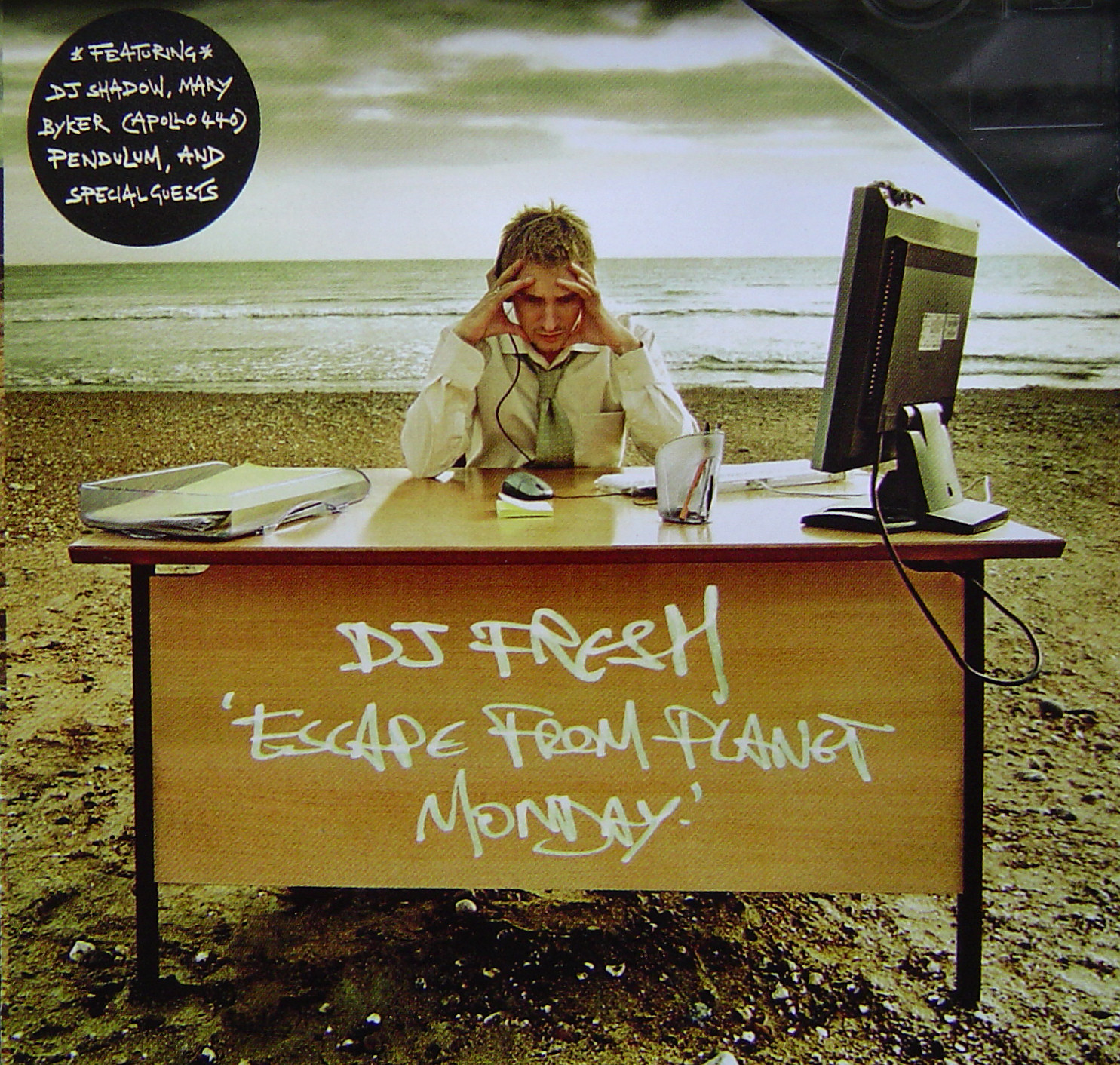

Studio album by DJ Fresh
- Released: 22 May 2006
- Recorded: 2001–06
- Genre: Drum and bass; techstep
- Length: 68:32
- Label: Breakbeat Kaos (BBK003); System Recordings
- Producer: Dan Stein

DJ Fresh chronology
Escape from Planet Monday (2006)	Kryptonite (2010)

Singles from Escape from Planet Monday
- 1. "Submarines" Released: 19 July 2004; 2. "All That Jazz" Released: 11 April 2005; 3. "X Project" Released: 4 November 2005; 4. "Funk Academy" Released: 11 November 2005; 5. "The Immortal" Released: 13 February 2006; 6. "Nervous / Matador" Released: 8 May 2006

Professional ratings
Review scores
Source	Rating
Allmusic	3.5/5 stars

Escape from Planet Monday is a drum and bass album by former Bad Company member DJ Fresh. The album was released in 2006 to positive reviews.

The album has several adjoining tracks such as the intro tracks and "The Looking Glass".

== Track listing ==
All music is composed by Dan Stein.

No.	Title	Length
1.	"Nervous" (featuring Mary Byker)	5:16
2.	"The Pink Panther"	4:14
3.	"All That Jazz" (featuring MC Darrison)	2:58
4.	"Babylon Rising" (featuring Pendulum and Singing Fats)	5:54
5.	"Closer" (DJ Fresh vs. DJ Shadow featuring Sally Dury and MC Darrison)	6:51
6.	"X Project" (Intro)	1:22
7.	"X Project"	5:12
8.	"The Immortal"	6:56
9.	"Submarines" (Domestic Cold War Edit)	5:40
10.	"Funk Academy" (Intro)	0:58
11.	"Funk Academy"	5:31
12.	"The Looking Glass" (featuring Jeremy Beadle)	1:48
13.	"All Strung Out" (Thunder VIP)	5:51
14.	"Throw" (Intro)	0:18
15.	"Throw" (featuring Neil Tennant)	9:43
Total length:		68:32
