= The Power (DJ Fresh song) =

2012 single by DJ Fresh featuring Dizzee Rascal

Single by DJ Fresh featuring Dizzee Rascal

from the album Nextlevelism
- Released: 3 June 2012
- Recorded: 2011
- Genre: Electro house; hip house
- Length: 2:47
- Label: Ministry of Sound
- Songwriters: Daniel Stein; The Invisible Men
- Producer: Daniel Stein

DJ Fresh singles chronology
| "Hot Right Now" (2012) | "The Power" (2012) | "The Feeling" (2012) |

Dizzee Rascal singles chronology
| "Loca" (2010) | "The Power" (2012) | "Scream" (2012) |

Music video
- "The Power" on YouTube

"The Power" is a single by English producer DJ Fresh, released as the third single from his album Nextlevelism. English rapper Dizzee Rascal features on the single as the main vocalist. It was released on 3 June 2012 in the United Kingdom as a digital download on iTunes.

== Music video ==
The music video for the song was uploaded to YouTube on 19 April 2012 at a length of two minutes and fifty-six seconds. The video was shot in Miami, United States during the Winter Music Conference 2012 and directed by Rohan Blair-Mangat. American rapper Bun B and the LMFAO robot appear in the video.

== Critical reception ==
Lewis Corner of Digital Spy gave the song a mixed review stating:

"I wanna party 'til my last breath/ 'Til there ain't no air in my lungs left," Rascal declares over speaker-jolting drum 'n' bass beats before the chorus bursts into a disco-come-dubstep raveathon with more heart-palpitating energy than a can of Red Bull. Just like the fizzy beverage, it's a track that most will prefer when mixed with a boozy tipple whilst bopping along at a Balearic Island resort..

== Track listings ==
iTunes EP and CD single
| No. | Title | Length |
|---|---|---|
| 1. | "The Power" (radio edit) | 2:47 |
| 2. | "The Power" (Andy C remix) | 5:12 |
| 3. | "The Power" (Datsik remix) | 3:32 |
| 4. | "The Power" (extended mix) | 3:44 |
| 5. | "The Power" (original mix) | 2:47 |

12" vinyl
| No. | Title | Length |
|---|---|---|
| 1. | "The Power" (Andy C remix) | 5:12 |
| 2. | "The Power" (Datsik remix) | 3:32 |

== Chart performance ==
=== Weekly charts ===
| Chart (2012) | Peak position |
|---|---|
| Ireland (IRMA) | 25 |
| Scottish Singles Sales (Official Charts) | 5 |
| UK Dance (Official Charts) | 2 |
| UK Indie (Official Charts) | 1 |
| UK Singles (Official Charts) | 6 |

=== Year-end charts ===
| Chart (2012) | Position |
|---|---|
| UK Singles (Official Charts Company) | 137 |

== Release history ==
| Region | Date | Format | Label |
|---|---|---|---|
| United Kingdom | 3 June 2012 | Digital download | Ministry of Sound |

== In popular culture ==
- The song was used in the 2012 racing video games Forza Horizon while you drive to the Horizon Festival, and Need for Speed: Most Wanted.
