= Freeway (song) =

1952 EP release featuring "Freeway" on Pacific Jazz Records.

"Freeway" is a 1952 jazz song composed by Chet Baker and recorded with the Gerry Mulligan Quartet. The song was released as part of an LP album and an EP single in the U.S. and a 45 single in the UK and France in 1952.

== Background ==
"Freeway" was recorded in sessions on October 15–16, 1952 at Gold Star Studios in Los Angeles, California. The personnel were Chet Baker, trumpet; Gerry Mulligan, baritone sax; Bob Whitlock, bass; and Chico Hamilton, drums. The sessions were supervised by Richard Bock and Roy Harte.

The song was released as part of a 7", vinyl 45 picture sleeve EP single on Pacific Jazz Records. The song was also on the 10" LP album released in 1952.

The song inspired the title of the 2012 musical by Bryce Hallet and Tim Draxl, based on the life and career of Chet Baker, Freeway - The Chet Baker Journey.

== Album appearances ==
"Freeway" appears on the following albums:

- Gerry Mulligan Quartet, Pacific Jazz Records, 1952
- Gerry Mulligan: Timeless, Pacific Jazz, 1963
- Chet Baker: The Pacific Jazz Years, Pacific Jazz, 1994
- The Gerry Mulligan Quartet: The Original Quartet with Chet Baker, Pacific Jazz, 1998.
- The Definitive Chet Baker, Blue Note Records, 2002.

== Other recordings ==
Tim Draxl recorded a version on his album My Funny Valentine released in 2012 on Fanfare Records.

The Tantillo Patti Quintet featuring Stefano Bagnoli has recorded "Freeway" on the 2013 album Rewind.

== Sources ==
- Baker, Chet. As Though I Had Wings: The Lost Memoir. St. Martin's Press, 1997.
- Baker, Chet. The Chet Baker Collection. Artist Transcriptions. Trumpet. Milwaukee, WI: Hal Leonard Corporation, 2013.
- Claxton, William. Young Chet: The Young Chet Baker. Te Neues Pub. Group, 1999.
- De Valk, Jeroen. Chet Baker: His Life and Music. Berkeley Hills Books, 2000.
- Gavin, James. Deep in a Dream: The Long Night of Chet Baker. 2011.
- Rouy, Gérard. Chet Baker. Paris: Editions du limon, 1992.
- Ruddick, Matthew. Funny Valentine: The Story of Chet Baker. Melrose Books, 2012.
