= How Love Begins =

Single by DJ Fresh & High Contrast featuring Dizzee Rascal
- Released: 5 February 2016
- Recorded: 2015
- Genre: Breakbeat; UK funky
- Length: 3:19
- Label: Ministry of Sound
- Songwriter(s): Dizzee Rascal; Dan Stein; Clare Maguire; Lincoln J. Barrett
- Producer(s): Dan Stein; High Contrast

DJ Fresh singles chronology
"Believer" (2015)	"How Love Begins" (2016)	"Say You Do" (2016)

High Contrast singles chronology
"Who's Loving You" (2014)	"How Love Begins" (2016)	"Calling My Name" (2016)

Dizzee Rascal singles chronology
"Still Sittin' Here" (2014)	"How Love Begins" (2016)	"Hype" (2016)

"How Love Begins" is a single by English drum and bass producer DJ Fresh and Welsh drum and bass DJ and producer High Contrast featuring vocals from English rapper, songwriter, singer, and record producer Dizzee Rascal and uncredited vocals from Clare Maguire. The song was released as a digital download on 5 February 2016 through Ministry of Sound as the seventh single from Fresh's forthcoming fourth studio album. The song peaked at number 53 on the UK Singles Chart. The song was written by Dizzee Rascal, Dan Stein, Clare Maguire and Lincoln J. Barrett.

== Music video ==
A music video to accompany the release of "How Love Begins" was first released onto YouTube on 23 December 2015 at a total length of three minutes and nineteen seconds. The video pays homage to 1980s workout videos featuring the dancers appearing in the video that is shown on television and throughout in various places (during a family dinner, a crime scene, a police station, a courtroom, a jail, and a bar). A blue haired woman watches the dancers at the beginning then shows up at the bar at the end of the song. Dizzee Rascal appears as a news presenter. The music video was directed by Scott Cudmore

== Track listing ==
Digital download - Single
No.	Title	Length
1.	"How Love Begins" (feat. Dizzee Rascal) (Hardcore Will Never Die Edit)	3:19

Digital download – EP
No.	Title	Length
1.	"How Love Begins"	3:17
2.	"Elevator" (with Erik Arbores)	2:47
3.	"What U Want"	2:55
4.	"Sumo" (with Jacob Plant)	3:53
5.	"Still Watching"	3:50
Total length:		16:42

== Chart performance ==
=== Weekly charts ===
Chart (2016)	Peak position
UK Singles (OCC)	53
UK Dance (OCC)	15
UK Indie (OCC)	8

== Release history ==
Region	Date	Format	Label
United Kingdom	5 February 2016	Digital download	Ministry of Sound
