= Louder (DJ Fresh song) =

2011 single by DJ Fresh

Single by DJ Fresh featuring Sian Evans

from the album Nextlevelism
- Released: 3 July 2011
- Recorded: 2010
- Genre: Dubstep; drum and bass
- Length: 3:26
- Label: Ministry of Sound
- Songwriters: Sian Evans; Daniel Stein
- Producer: Daniel Stein

DJ Fresh singles chronology
"Lassitude" (2010)	"Louder" (2011)	"Hot Right Now" (2012)

Sian Evans singles chronology
"Louder" (2011)

Music video
- "Louder" on YouTube

"Louder" is a song by British producer DJ Fresh. It features vocals from British singer and Kosheen frontwoman Sian Evans. The song serves as the theme song for the Lucozade Sport Lite campaign. It was released on 3 July 2011 on Ministry of Sound. "Louder" is considered an important landmark for dubstep music as it was the first of the genre to reach number one on the UK Singles Chart. The song was featured on the soundtrack to Studio Liverpool's Wipeout 2048 and used as the promotional theme for Fox8's reality programme Cricket Superstar.

== Music video ==
The music video for the song was uploaded to YouTube on 23 May 2011. It was shot by director Ben Newman as part of the Lucozade Sport Lite campaign.

== Critical reception ==
Robert Copsey of Digital Spy gave the song a positive review stating:

"Like sipping on a bottle of the electrolyte-infused liquid, its wobbly drum 'n' bass lines are guaranteed to satisfy many a club-goers craving for a three-minute fix of hang-banging, fist-pumping and head-spinning music. "It's gonna get louder," warns guest vocalist Sian Evans on the hi-NRG chorus before breaking into a glorious middle 8 that sounds like a lost '90s classic - prompting the response, 'Don't worry love, keep cranking that dial!'.

== Chart performance ==
The song debuted at number one on the UK Singles Chart, UK Dance Chart, UK Indie Chart and the Scottish Charts with first week sales in excess of 140,000 copies. In its second week, the single shifted additional 80,000 digital copies. The song also peaked number four on the Irish Singles Chart. As of February 2012, "Louder" had sold 507,659 units in the UK.

== Track listings ==
- Digital EP and CD single
1. "Louder" (radio edit) – 3:26
2. "Louder" (club mix) – 4:35
3. "Louder" (Hervé remix) – 4:34
4. "Louder" (Drumsound and Bassline Smith remix) – 4:31
5. "Louder" (Flux Pavilion and Doctor P remix) – 3:55
- Louder EP – US iTunes
1. "Louder" (featuring Sian Evans) – 3:26
2. "The Power" (featuring Dizzee Rascal) – 2:47
3. "The Edge" (featuring Ayah Marar) – 3:22
4. "Louder" (featuring Sian Evans) (Flux Pavilion and Doctor P remix) – 3:55
- 12" vinyl – drum and bass – dubstep
1. "Louder" (Hervé remix) – 4:36
2. "Louder" (Drumsound and Bassline Smith remix) – 4:32
3. "Louder" (club mix) – 4:36
4. "Louder" (Flux Pavilion and Doctor P remix) – 3:57

== Charts and certifications ==
=== Weekly charts ===
Chart (2011–2013)	Peak position
Australia (ARIA)	96
Australian Dance (ARIA)	24
Belgium (Ultratop 50 Flanders)	5
Belgium Dance (Ultratop Flanders)	1
Belgium (Ultratop 50 Wallonia)	43
Belgium Dance (Ultratop Wallonia)	27
Ireland (IRMA)	4
Scottish Singles Sales (Official Charts)	1
Slovakia Airplay (ČNS IFPI)	68
UK Singles (Official Charts)	1
UK Dance (Official Charts)	1
UK Singles Downloads (Official Charts)	1
UK Independent (Official Charts)	1
US Dance Club Songs (Billboard)	18
US Hot Dance/Electronic Songs (Billboard)	21

=== Year-end charts ===
Chart (2011)	Position
Belgium (Ultratop 50 Flanders)	58
UK Singles (OCC)	25
Chart (2013)	Position
US Hot Dance/Electronic Songs (Billboard)	61

=== Certifications ===
Region	Certification	Certified units/sales
United Kingdom (BPI)	Platinum	600,000^{‡}
^{‡} Sales+streaming figures based on certification alone.

== Release history ==
Region	Date	Format	Label
Ireland	3 July 2011	Digital download	Ministry of Sound
United Kingdom	3 July 2011	Digital download	Ministry of Sound
Australia	7 August 2011	Digital download	Ministry of Sound
Netherlands and Belgium	7 July 2011	Digital download	Spinnin'
