= Hot Right Now =

2012 single by DJ Fresh featuring Rita Ora

Single by DJ Fresh featuring Rita Ora

from the album Nextlevelism
- Released: 13 February 2012
- Studio: Grove
- Genre: Drum and bass
- Length: 3:02
- Label: Ministry of Sound
- Songwriters: Daniel Stein; Sian Evans; The Invisible Men
- Producers: Daniel Stein; Wez Clarke

DJ Fresh singles chronology
"Louder" (2011)	"Hot Right Now" (2012)	"The Power" (2012)

Rita Ora singles chronology
"Where's Your Love" (2008)	"Hot Right Now" (2012)	"How We Do (Party)" (2012)

Music video
- "Hot Right Now" on YouTube

"Hot Right Now" is a single by English drum and bass producer DJ Fresh featuring British singer Rita Ora, released on 13 February 2012 as the second single from his third studio album, Nextlevelism (2012), before later being included as a bonus track on Ora's debut studio album Ora (2012).

"Hot Right Now" debuted at the top of UK Singles Chart on 19 February 2012. The Official Charts Company confirmed "Hot Right Now" as the UK's first ever drum and bass number one.

== Background and composition ==
In July 2011, DJ Fresh released "Louder", the first single from his third studio album, Nextlevelism. It reached peak position on the UK Singles Chart, giving DJ Fresh his first ever number one. After "Louder", Fresh started working on "Hot Right Now" and as he was looking for a vocalist for the song, he came across Ora's cover videos on YouTube. Daniel Stein and The Invisible Men wrote the song while Daniel Stein and Wez Clarke produced it.

== Critical reception ==
Robert Copsey of Digital Spy gave the song a mixed review stating:

Judging by the results of his latest track, we assume that the burden became all-too-great. Yes, the head-spinning breakneck beats and fuzzy basslines are impressive, as are the efforts of rising Roc Nation-signed guest singer Rita Ora, but there's something lacking here that made 'Louder' the hit that it was. Our suggestion? Lyrics such as "Turn it up right now/ Put your hands in the air if you want it right now" can't be doing him many favours..

== Commercial performance ==
"Hot Right Now" debuted at number one on the UK Singles Chart, becoming DJ Fresh's second and Ora's first UK number one, selling over 128,000 copies in its first week. By the end of the year, "Hot Right Now" sold 482,000 copies in the United Kingdom, making it the 23rd best-selling single of 2012.

== Music video ==
The music video for the song was directed by Rohan BM and filmed in Los Angeles.

== Track listings ==
iTunes EP
No.	Title	Length
1.	"Hot Right Now" (radio edit)	3:02
2.	"Hot Right Now" (extended mix)	3:40
3.	"Hot Right Now" (Camo & Krooked remix)	4:34
4.	"Hot Right Now" (Zed Bias remix)	5:16
5.	"Hot Right Now" (Zomboy remix)	4:57
6.	"Hot Right Now" (Kamuki remix)	4:26

12" vinyl
No.	Title	Length
1.	"Hot Right Now" (extended mix)	3:40
2.	"Hot Right Now" (Zomboy remix)	4:57
3.	"Hot Right Now" (Camo & Krooked remix)	4:34
4.	"Hot Right Now" (Zed Bias dub mix)	4:46

CD single
No.	Title	Length
1.	"Hot Right Now" (radio edit)	3:02
2.	"Hot Right Now" (extended mix)	3:40

Exclusive remixes
No.	Title	Length
1.	"Hot Right Now" (Redroche remix)	6:02
2.	"Hot Right Now" (Zed Bias dub mix)	4:46

== Charts ==
=== Weekly charts ===
Chart (2012)	Peak position
Australia (ARIA)	46
Australia Dance (ARIA)	7
Austria (Ö3 Austria Top 40)	24
Belgium (Ultratop 50 Flanders)	11
Belgium Dance (Ultratop Flanders)	1
Belgium (Ultratip Bubbling Under Wallonia)	33
Belgium Dance (Ultratop Wallonia)	31
CIS (TopHit)	14
Czech Republic Airplay (ČNS IFPI)	5
Euro Digital Songs (Billboard)	4
Germany (GfK)	28
Ireland (IRMA)	17
Netherlands (Dutch Top 40)	11
Netherlands (Single Top 100)	22
Poland Dance (ZPAV)	22
Poland (Video Chart)	1
Romania Airplay (Media Forest)	7
Russia Airplay (TopHit)	16
Scottish Singles Sales (Official Charts)	2
Slovakia Airplay (ČNS IFPI)	9
Switzerland (Schweizer Hitparade)	39
UK Singles (Official Charts)	1
UK Dance (Official Charts)	1
UK Singles Downloads (Official Charts)	1
UK Indie (Official Charts)	1
Ukraine Airplay (TopHit)	23

=== Year-end charts ===
2012 year-end chart performance for "Hot Right Now"
Chart (2012)	Position
Belgium (Ultratop 50 Flanders)	61
Netherlands (Dutch Top 40)	67
Russia Airplay (TopHit)	37
UK Singles (OCC)	24
Ukraine Airplay (TopHit)	199

2013 year-end chart performance for "Hot Right Now"
Chart (2013)	Position
Russia Airplay (TopHit)	188

== Certifications ==
Region	Certification	Certified units/sales
New Zealand (RMNZ)	Gold	15,000^{‡}
United Kingdom (BPI)	Platinum	600,000^{‡}
^{‡} Sales+streaming figures based on certification alone.

== Release history ==
Region	Date	Format	Label
United Kingdom	13 February 2012	Digital download	Ministry of Sound
