= Gold Dust (DJ Fresh song) =

2008 single by DJ Fresh

Single by DJ Fresh featuring Ce'cile or Ms. Dynamite

from the album Kryptonite (Ce'cile version) and Nextlevelism (Ms. Dynamite version)
- A-side: "Gold Dust" (2008 release)
- B-side: "The Field" (2008 release)
- Released: 16 August 2008 (instrumental); 1 August 2010 (featuring Ce'cile); 2 December 2012 (Shy FX re-edit)
- Recorded: 2008–10
- Genre: Drum and bass
- Length: 7:51 (original 2008 instrumental); 10:44 (2010 version featuring Ce'cile); 3:14 (album version); 3:02 (Shy FX re-edit)
- Label: Breakbeat Kaos (BBK027); Data (DATA216)
- Songwriter: Dan Stein
- Producer: Dan Stein

DJ Fresh singles chronology
"Hypercaine" (2009)	"Gold Dust" (2008)	"Lassitude" (2010)
"The Feeling" (2012)	"Gold Dust" (2012)	"Earthquake" (2013)

Ms. Dynamite singles chronology
"Light Up" (2012)	"Gold Dust" (2012)	"Cloud 9" (2013)

Music video
- "Gold Dust" on YouTube

"Gold Dust" is a song by British-based DJ and record producer DJ Fresh. It is the third single released from his second album Kryptonite.

Originally put out as a 12" in 2008, it was re-released in 2010 featuring vocals from Ce'cile although there is a version of the song on his album Nextlevelism which was released in 2012 and features Ms. Dynamite on vocals. The 2010 version of the song peaked at number 24 on the UK Singles Chart. The music video was directed by Ben Newman and edited by Jacek Zajkowski. In 2012, Shy FX made a 're-edit' of the song that was re-released to radio. This version reached number 22 on the UK Singles Chart and number 39 on the Irish Singles Chart.

The sales of all versions are combined enabling it to have sold in excess of 1,800,000 copies, receiving a triple Platinum certification, despite never reaching the top twenty of the UK Singles Chart.

== Music video ==
The official music video was filmed at the Brownsville Project in Brooklyn and captures some performances by American Double Dutch champions, Jumpers in Command. The youths are seen doing various activities including skateboarding, skipping, and free running.

== Critical reception ==
Fraser McAlpine of BBC Chart Blog gave the song a positive review stating:

Sometimes the brightest gems are right in front of your eyes, hiding in plain sight. Or just obscured by people who know they are there, but have forgotten to tell you.

With this song, and its fantastic video, I will admit that my attention was miles away, probably raking through some slower, drabber, less fun things (ie: ANYTHING ELSE). I had no idea something this ker-ay-zee, this life-affirming, this astonishingly chipper was released across on my beloved internet just seven days ago, until a friend dragged me over to look at what he called "the skipping video" on his phone.

Yeah, that's right, a skipping video. I mean how impressive can a video which features people either successfully or unsuccessfully jumping over a moving rope actually b...oh my LORD have you SEEN THE SKIPPING VIDEO? YOU'VE GOT TO SEE THE SKIPPING VIDEO! THE SKIPPING VIDEO IS AMAZING!.

== Track listings ==
2008 12" release
No.	Title	Length
1.	"Gold Dust"	7:51
2.	"The Field"	5:53

2010 digital download (Ce'cile version)
No.	Title	Length
1.	"Gold Dust" (radio edit)	3:14
2.	"Gold Dust" (vocal VIP mix)	5:18
3.	"Gold Dust" (Flux Pavilion remix)	5:25
4.	"Gold Dust" (Mike Delinquent Project remix)	6:08
5.	"Gold Dust" (Vent remix)	5:02
6.	"Gold Dust" (Sammy J remix)	6:03

2010 CD single (Ce'cile version)
No.	Title	Length
1.	"Gold Dust" (radio edit)	3:17
2.	"Gold Dust" (vocal VIP mix)	5:20
3.	"Gold Dust" (Sammy J remix)	6:06
4.	"Gold Dust" (Mike Delinquent Project remix)	6:11
5.	"Gold Dust" (Flux Pavilion remix)	5:28
6.	"Gold Dust" (Vent remix)	5:05
7.	"Gold Dust" (Mike Delinquent Project edit)	3:33
8.	"Gold Dust" (Sammy J edit)	3:40

2012 digital download (Ms. Dynamite version)
No.	Title	Length
1.	"Gold Dust" (Shy FX re-edit – clean)	3:02
2.	"Gold Dust" (TC remix)	4:56
3.	"Gold Dust" (WestFunk and Steve Smart remix)	5:15
4.	"Gold Dust" (Kutz full vocal mix)	5:26
5.	"Gold Dust" (Riddim Commission remix)	4:20
6.	"Gold Dust" (Max Polyphonic remix)	5:39

== Chart performance ==
=== Weekly charts ===
Chart (2010–12)	Peak position
Belgium (Ultratop 50 Flanders)	48
Czech Republic Airplay (ČNS IFPI)	75
Ireland (IRMA)	39
Scottish Singles Sales (Official Charts)	32
UK Dance (Official Charts)	2
UK Indie (Official Charts)	2
UK Singles (Official Charts)	22

=== Year-end charts ===
Chart (2010)	Position
UK Singles Chart	142

Chart (2012)	Position
UK Singles Chart	152

== Certifications ==
Region	Certification	Certified units/sales
New Zealand (RMNZ)	3× Platinum	90,000^{‡}
United Kingdom (BPI)	3× Platinum	1,800,000^{‡}
^{‡} Sales+streaming figures based on certification alone.

== Release history ==
Region	Date	Version	Format	Label
United Kingdom	1 August 2010	Ce'cile	Digital download	Data
United Kingdom	2 December 2012	Shy FX Re-Edit	Digital download	Ministry of Sound
