= Ce'cile =

Jamaican dancehall musician (born 1974)

- Also known as: Cécile
- Born: Cécile Claudine Charlton; 24 February 1974 (age 52); Manchester Parish, Jamaica
- Genre: Dancehall

Ce'cile (also spelled Cécile, born Cecile Claudine Charlton on 24 February 1974 in Manchester Parish, Jamaica), is a Jamaican musician in the dancehall genre.

== Biography ==
Ce'cile grew up in Porus, and Mile Gully, Jamaica, spending most of her youth in Mandeville, where her grandfather had previously been mayor.

Ce' Cile discovered music through a friend of her father, Michael "Ibo" Cooper from the reggae band Third World and brought out her first single "Beat of Her Heart". She added her own style to classical reggae and took it toward dancehall. In 1995, Steven Ventura, the owner of Celestial Sound Recordings, noticed her. Then followed a period where she worked as a studio manager and recorded multiple demo tapes. She also appeared on stage as a backing vocalist for various bands, as well as writing and producing songs with artists such as Jah Mason & Chrisinti.

Her first major success was with the single "Can You Do the Work" with Sean Paul in 2001. This track later appeared on his album Dutty Rock (Atlantic Records), which went on to sell over two million copies in the United States, also winning a Grammy Award. In 2003, she signed with Delicious Vinyl Records, but she was not given the chance to release an album. Instead, she released singles in cooperation with other artists. In 2005 she left the label and toured with T.O.K. in Europe.

Her first album, Bad Gyal, was released in 2008 with Kingstone Records, and was the first dancehall album that was ever discussed in the German Playboy. Next to the article was a large print promotion photo of Cécile, but she did not appear as a Playmate. In 2009 her second album Waiting was released with Danger Zone/SoBe Entertainment.

Today Cécile is known internationally. Her albums sell well in Germany and Japan amongst others. She appears as guest singer on singles from Sean Paul, Carl Henry, Mono & Nikitaman, DJ Fresh, Doctor P, and D-Flame. Her single "Gold Dust" with DJ Fresh peaked at number 24 on the UK Singles Chart, with a Shy FX re-edit that reached number 22 in the UK and number 39 on the Irish Singles Chart. The sale of all versions of "Gold Dust" are combined enabling it to have sold in excess of 1,800,000 copies, receiving a triple Platinum certification by the BPI, despite not reaching the top twenty of the UK Singles Chart.

== Personal life ==
She had a child in 2012 with her then boyfriend, recording artist Christopher Martin.

== Discography ==
- 2008: Goody
- 2008: Bad Gyal (Kingstone Records)
- 2009: Waiting (Danger Zone/SoBe Entertainment)
- 2009: Worth It
- 2011: Jamaicanization
- 2014: Still Running
- 2016: Diary of a Journey
- 2019: Music + Magic
- 2021: Sophisticated
