= Dominique Young Unique =

American rapper

- Born: Dominique Lashawn Clark; March 15, 1991 (age 35)
- Origin: Tampa, Florida, U.S.
- Genres: Hip hop, electronic
- Occupations: Rapper, model
- Years active: 2009–present
- Labels: Sony Records (2012–2014), The Hana Road Music Group (present)

Dominique Lashawn Clark (born March 15, 1991), better known by her stage name Dominique Young Unique, is an American rapper and model. In 2012, Clark signed to Sony Records, a contract which ended in 2014. Dominique is currently signed to The Hana Road Music group.

== Career ==
=== Early beginnings ===
As a model, Clarks' debut experience on the runway was in 2011, for London-based fashion designer Katie Eary. She also appeared in Vogue's September 2012 issue, alongside fellow models Tali Lennox and Cara Delevingne.

=== 2009–present: Breakthrough ===
Clark first gained recognition in 2009, when she released her debut EP Hot Girl, followed by her promotional video for ‘War Talk’, a song taken from her debut mixtape Domination, released in 2010. She has since released two more mixtapes, Glamorous Touch and Stupid Pretty, both in 2011, alongside various promotional videos, and collaborations with Mad Decent-signed producer Branko, A.N.D.Y., and most recently, a feature on "Earthquake", a collaboration between DJ Fresh and Diplo, released by Ministry of Sound.

Clark's debut performance of "Earthquake" occurred during DJ Fresh's set at the New York leg of the international Electric Daisy Carnival festival. Clark and DJ Fresh performed "Earthquake" again at Radio 1's Big Weekend, during the latter's headlining set on the "1Xtra Arena/In New Music We Trust Stage". Additionally, an edited version of "Earthquake" was included on the Kick-Ass 2 soundtrack under the name "Motherquake".

In February 2014 Clark featured on Le Youth's single "Dance with Me" which reached 11 on the official UK singles chart. Her debut single, "Throw It Down", was released on April 20, 2014.

She is the featured artist on Don Diablo's May 2016 single "Drifter".

== Discography ==
=== EPs ===
| Title | EP details |
|---|---|
| Hot Girl | Released: 2009; Format: Digital download |
| Just Doing Me | Released: 2014; Format: Digital download |

=== Mixtapes ===
| Title | Mixtape details |
|---|---|
| Domination | Released: 2010; Format: Digital download |
| Glamorous Touch | Released: 2011; Format: Digital download |
| Stupid Pretty | Released: 2011; Format: Digital download |
| Paradise | Released: 2011; Format: Digital download |
| Domination Reload | Released: 2015; Format: Digital download |

=== Singles ===
==== As lead artist ====
| Year | Single | Peak chart positions | Album |
| Year | Single | BEL (Fl) | Album |
|---|---|---|---|
| 2014 | "Throw It Down" (Note: did not chart on the Ultratop's Belgian Flanders Singles Chart, but did chart at number 45 on the Ultratip chart, the top 100 songs which haven't made the Ultratop 50.) | 45 | Non-album single |

==== As featured artist ====
| Year | Single | Peak chart positions | | | | | | Certifications | Album |
| Year | Single | BEL (Fl) | IRE | SCO | UK | UK Dance | UK Indie | Certifications | Album |
|---|---|---|---|---|---|---|---|---|---|
| 2013 | "Pushing" (A.N.D.Y featuring Dominique Young Unique) | — | — | — | — | — | — | | Non-album singles |
| 2013 | "Earthquake" (DJ Fresh vs. Diplo featuring Dominique Young Unique) | 21 | 42 | 6 | 4 | 3 | 1 | BPI: Silver | Non-album singles |
| 2014 | "Dance with Me" (Note: did not chart on the Ultratop's Belgian Flanders Singles Chart, but did chart at number 42 on the Ultratip chart, the top 100 songs which haven't made the Ultratop 50.) (Le Youth featuring Dominique Young Unique) | 42 | 87 | 18 | 11 | 6 | — | | Non-album singles |
| 2014 | "Utopia" (Bang La Decks featuring Dominique Young Unique) | — | — | — | — | — | — | | Non-album singles |
| 2016 | "Drifter" (Don Diablo featuring DYU) | — | — | — | — | — | — | | Non-album singles |
| 2020 | "BOSS" (Coone featuring Dominique Young Unique) | — | — | — | — | — | — | | |
| | "—" denotes a single that did not chart or was not released in that territory. | | | | | | | | |
