= RaVaughn =

American singer-songwriter

- Born: RaVaughn Nichelle Brown
- Origin: Carson, California, United States
- Genres: R&B
- Occupations: Singer-songwriter
- Years active: 2007–present
- Labels: Columbia Records; Compound University

RaVaughn Nichelle Brown, known professionally as RaVaughn, is an American singer-songwriter from Carson, California. She was initially signed to Ne-Yo's imprint Compound University which includes artists such as Adrienne Bailon. RaVaughn is the older sister of actress Rhyon Nicole Brown. Her music is primarily R&B but contains pop and rock elements. She has been influenced by artists such as Mary J. Blige, Aretha Franklin, Anita Baker, Beyoncé and Nas. RaVaughn has recorded demos and background vocals for multiple artists, including Celine Dion, Natasha Bedingfield, Jennifer Hudson and Brandy to name a few. RaVaughn released her debut EP, Love Always… The Introduction, in 2012. Her unreleased debut studio album, Love Always, was supposedly underpromoted by the singles "Better Be Good" and "Best Friend". RaVaughn is currently a Background Vocalist with Justin Timberlake on his 2024 The Forget Tomorrow World Tour, which began April 29, 2024 in Vancouver, and is scheduled to conclude on December 20, 2024 in Kansas City.

== Career ==
After attending college in New York City and putting out a few demos, she became a background singer on the hit TV show Glee for three seasons. Shortly thereafter, she was signed to Ne-Yo's imprint Compound University and soon after to Columbia Records in 2011.

RaVaughn attended the 2013 Grammy Awards with singer-songwriter, Ne-Yo. On June 17, RaVaughn sat down with The Source to discuss her career and unmateralized projects. In the interview, she shed some light on her album, Love Always. "For my debut album, I want women to be inspired to be a strong woman, not taking B.S. from anyone, and being in control for yourself."

=== Releases ===
RaVaughn's debut EP entitled Love Always… The Introduction was released on September 14, 2012. After its release, music website Urban Music Daily wrote that "RaVaughn is the ultimate contemporary R&B artist. The passion she pours into her lyrics is astounding." On February 21, 2013, she released her planned debut album's lead single "Better Be Good" featuring Wale. On March 15, 2013, she published via her SoundCloud page her album's sampler which includes tracks "Better Be Good", "It's Over", "Sick of Crying", "Lovin U", and "God Made Me Over". Her second single "Best Friend" was released on May 16, 2013. As of 2014, RaVaughn had since been released from her deal with Compound and Columbia Records, thus the album, Love Always, has remained unreleased.

=== Performances ===
She performed her song "Best Friend" On Sirius XM Radio in April 2013.

On May 7, 2013, RaVaughn joined Yahoo!'s On the Road tour featuring Kendrick Lamar in Cincinnati, Ohio. In an exclusive interview with Yahoo!, she talked about her past experiences and her life on tour.

RaVaughn performed alongside Kendrick Lamar, 2 Chainz, and Wale, at 106 KMEL's Summer Jam concert on June 9 in Oakland, California.

Staff members at Concrete Loop were "blown away" by RaVaughn's exclusive performance of "Best Friend" on June 26, 2013.

RaVaughn performed at the 2013 BET Awards in Los Angeles, California on June 30, 2013 as one of the Music Matters artists.

== Discography ==
EPs

- 2012: Love Always… The Introduction

Albums

- Love Always (shelved)

Singles

List of showing year released and album name
Single	Album	Year
"Better Be Good" ft. Wale	Non-album singles	2013
"Best Friend"	Non-album singles	2013
