= DJ Fresh =

English DJ and producer (born 1977)

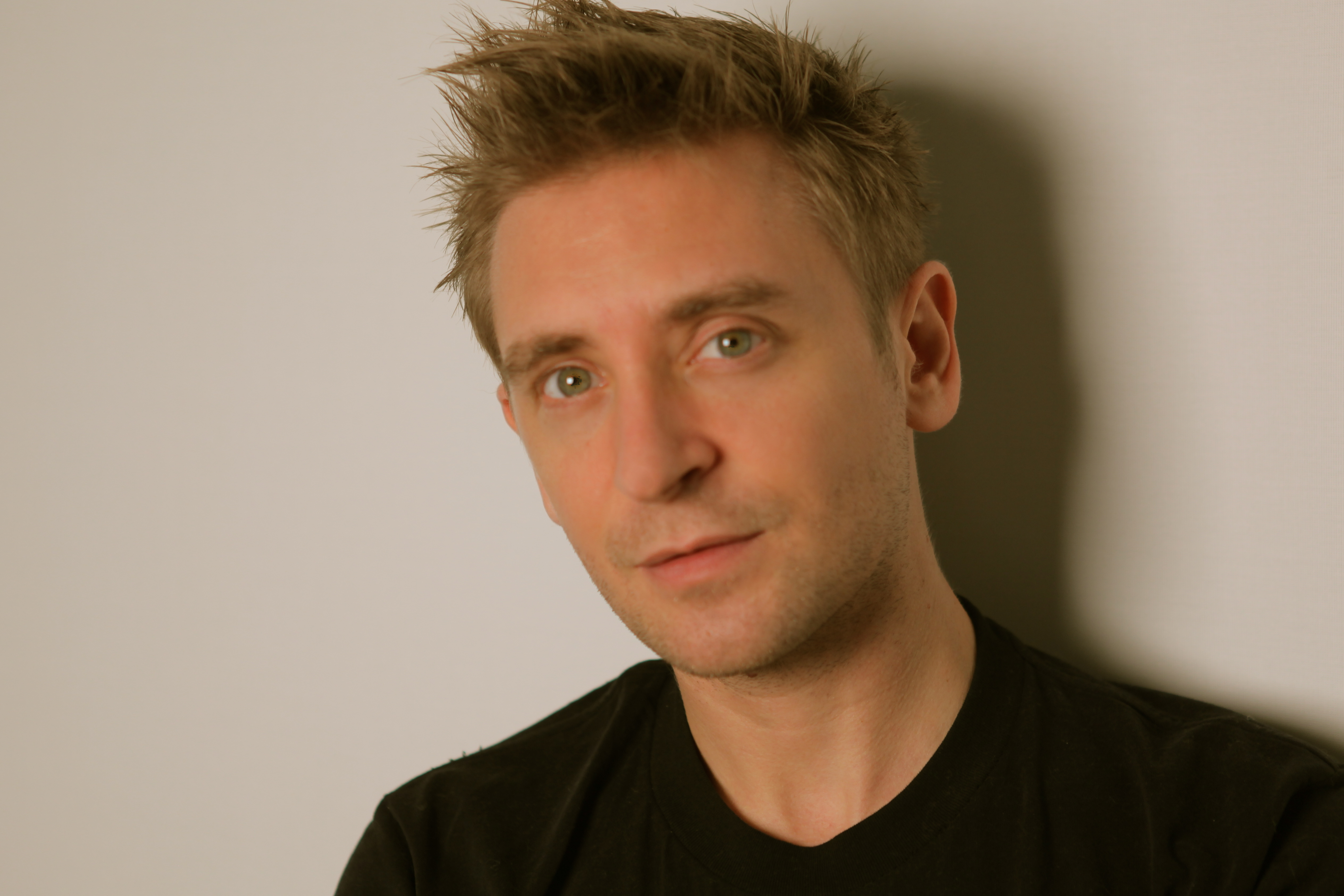
- DJ Fresh in 2011

Background information
- Also known as: DJ Fresh; Fresh; Absolute Zero
- Born: Daniel Edward Stein; 11 April 1977 (age 49)
- Origin: Worthing, England
- Genres: Drum and bass; electro house; dubstep
- Occupations: DJ; record producer
- Instruments: Synthesizer; keyboards
- Years active: 1996–present
- Labels: Breakbeat Kaos; Ministry of Sound; Data; RAM; V; Valve
- Member of: Bad Company
- Website: thedjfresh.com

Daniel Edward Stein (born 11 April 1977), known professionally as DJ Fresh, is an English DJ and record producer. A member of the drum and bass group Bad Company with Darren "dBridge" White, Jason Maldini, and Michael "Vegas" Wojcicki, he co-founded the music website Dogs on Acid and, with Adam F, the record label Breakbeat Kaos. His singles "Louder", featuring Sian Evans, and "Hot Right Now", featuring Rita Ora, became the first dubstep and drum and bass tracks, respectively, to reach number one on the UK Singles Chart. Stein retrained as a software engineer, subsequently worked in machine learning and co-founded Voice-Swap, an AI voice-modelling company that licenses singers' voices and pays royalties to participating artists.

He has released three studio albums and achieved eight UK top-ten singles, including six top-five hits and two number ones. His single "Gold Dust" was certified triple platinum in the United Kingdom by the British Phonographic Industry in 2024.

== Early life ==
Daniel Stein was born in Worthing, West Sussex in 1977; his father had come from South Africa "with nothing" aged 21. He says that from a very early age he was fascinated by computers and programming, and as a child imagined he'd pursue that as a career. He attended the boarding school Bradfield College in Berkshire where a love of The Cure, Happy Mondays and other indie and alternative music led him to acid house, hardcore rave and jungle, then studied business information technology at university; however a combined fascination with, DJing, pirate radio and making music using early tracker software like OctaMED on a Commodore Amiga drew his attention away from his studies. He says he spent his student loan on a sampler, then against his family's wishes dropped out of university to pursue music.

== Career ==
=== Early success and Escape from Planet Monday (1998–2008) ===
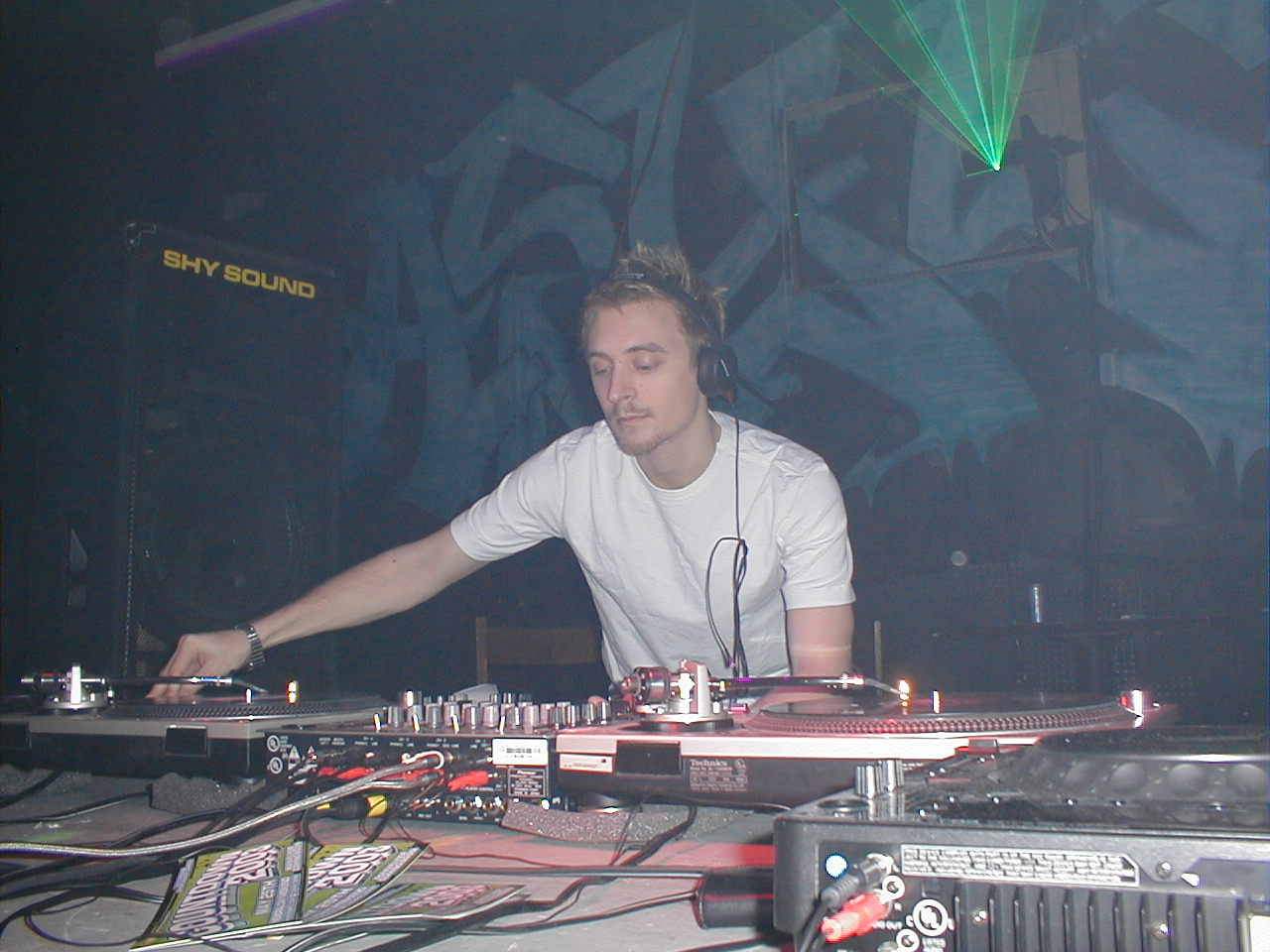
DJ Fresh performing at a rave in Springfield, Massachusetts in 2003

Along with the three other members of Bad Company, Fresh founded the record label BC Recordings, as well as the website Dogs on Acid. Bad Company's track "The Nine", was released in 1998 when Fresh was just 21 years old. "The Nine" was later voted the greatest drum & bass track of all time by readers of Knowledge Magazine

Resuming his solo career in 2002, Fresh founded Breakbeat Punk, which merged with Adam F's Kaos Recordings to become Breakbeat Kaos in 2003. In 2004 Dogs on Acid was given its own imprint.

In 2006, Fresh released his first studio album, Escape from Planet Monday, featuring "The Immortal", "X Project", "Nervous" and "All that Jazz" on Breakbeat Kaos.

=== Kryptonite and commercial success (2009–2011) ===
In 2009 Fresh released a 12" of "Heavyweight" (with Fantasia on the B side) on the Digital Soundboy label. "Heavyweight" had a different style from Fresh's usual output, and gained positive reviews and a general positive response through the underground scene and within various radio stations. Fresh subsequently released "Hypercaine" (including a remix from Nero in September 2009) and made BBC Radio 1's daytime playlist.

On 1 August 2010, he re-released his song "Gold Dust" featuring vocals from Ce'Cile, where it peaked 24 in the UK and 39 in Ireland, it marked his first Top 40 hit in both countries. On 16 August, he released his second studio album, "Kryptonite" where it peaked 4 on the UK Dance Chart.

He then released his follow-up single called "Lassitude" with Sigma featuring vocals from Koko. It managed to peak 98 on the UK Singles Chart and 11 on the UK Dance Chart.

=== Nextlevelism and continued commercial success (2011–2012) ===
"Louder", the first single from his third album Nextlevelism, was released on 3 July 2011. The song was used as part of a Lucozade Lite advertising campaign in the UK and Ireland. The song features vocals from Welsh singer Sian Evans from the band Kosheen and peaked number 4 on the Irish Singles Chart and was the first ever dubstep number one on the UK Singles Chart.

On 12 February 2012, the second single "Hot Right Now", featuring British singer Rita Ora, became his second number one in the UK, and the first drum and bass song to chart at number one in the UK. The third single from the album, "The Power", which features rapper Dizzee Rascal, was officially released on 3 June 2012.

Following the release of his fourth single, "The Feeling", which features rapper RaVaughn, on 23 September 2012, DJ Fresh released his third studio album, Nextlevelism, on 1 October 2012 through Ministry of Sound Recordings. "Nextlevelism" includes the songs "Hot Right Now", "Louder", "The Power", "Gold Dust", "The Feeling" and features Rita Ora, Dizzee Rascal, Rizzle Kicks, Professor Green, Ms Dynamite, The Fray and Liam Bailey.

=== 2012–2018 ===
Stein started working in 2012 on his fourth studio album. The album's lead single, "Earthquake", is a collaboration with Diplo and Dominique Young Unique. The song was released on 18 August 2013 and managed to reach number four on the UK Singles Chart. An edited version titled "Motherquake" was produced and released specifically for the film Kick-Ass 2. The album's second single, "Dibby Dibby Sound", samples the song "Dibby Dibby" by moombahton producer Jay Fay and features additional vocals from Ms. Dynamite. The song is credited as DJ Fresh vs. Jay Fay. The song received the title of Zane Lowe's "Hottest Record in the World". The third single from the album, "Make U Bounce", is credited as DJ Fresh vs. TC featuring Little Nikki. The song is a reworking of TC's previously unreleased 2012 song "Make You Bounce" and was released on 29 June 2014. The fourth single, "Flashlight", features Ellie Goulding and was released on 28 September 2014. It is a reworking of the original version that appears on Goulding's album Halcyon Days. The fifth single, "Gravity", features Ella Eyre and was released on 8 February 2015. The song appears on Eyre's album Feline.The sixth single, "Believer", with DJ Adam F, was released as a digital download on 7 June 2015. "How Love Begins", with bass DJ and producer High Contrast featuring vocals from English rapper, songwriter, singer, and record producer Dizzee Rascal and uncredited vocals from Clare Maguire. The song was released as a digital download on 5 February 2016 as the seventh single. "Bang Bang", with Diplo featuring vocals from R. City, Selah Sue and Craig David. The song was released as a digital download on 9 December 2016 as the eighth single from Fresh's forthcoming fourth studio album.

In 2016, he featured alongside Imani on Sigala's "Say You Do", which reached number five on the UK Singles Chart.

=== 2018–present ===
After surviving cancer in 2017, Fresh changed his focus to his other long running passion of software development.

Stein retrained as a software engineer and subsequently worked in machine learning. He later co-founded Voice-Swap, an AI voice-modelling company that enables music producers to use licensed models of singers' voices and pays royalties to participating artists. In 2026, Voice-Swap became an initial participant in the World Intellectual Property Organization's Technical Exchange Network and joined DDEX, the music industry's data standards organisation.

In 2024, "Gold Dust" was certified triple platinum by the British Phonographic Industry, representing 1.8 million units from sales and streaming in the United Kingdom.

== Discography ==
Studio albums

- Escape from Planet Monday (2006)
- Kryptonite (2010)
- Nextlevelism (2012)

== Awards and nominations ==
Year	Organisation	Award	Work	Result
2013	BRIT Awards	British Single of the Year	"Hot Right Now" (featuring Rita Ora)	Nominated
