= Freestylers =

British electronic music group

- Also known as: Raw as F**k
- Origin: London, England
- Genres: Electronic, breakbeat, trip hop, big beat, acid house, electro house
- Years active: 1996–present
- Members: Matt Cantor; Aston Harvey; MC SirReal
- Website: FreestylersMusic.co.uk

The Freestylers are a British electronic music group, consisting of producers Matt Cantor and Aston Harvey. They have released five studio albums and a number of mix compilations for, among others, Fabric and BBC Radio.

The group took their name from their first sample "Don't Stop the Rock" by Freestyle, which they also sampled on "Drop the Boom".

== Career ==
=== Formation–Raw as Fuck album (1996–2004) ===
The Freestylers formed in 1996 when DJs and dance music producers Matt Cantor and Aston Harvey joined forces. Both Cantor and Aston had been involved in the British dance music scene since the early 1990s. Cantor had recorded both as Cut & Paste and Strike with Andy Gardner (Plump DJs). Aston Harvey recorded as Blapps! Posse, best known for their 1990 breakbeat dance hit "Don't Hold Back", before working with Definition of Sound, Rebel MC and DJ Rap (as DJ Rap and Aston).

The trio's first single, "Drop the Boom (AK-48)", on their own Scratch City Records in 1996 became a dancefloor hit in the United Kingdom and Miami. The band released the Freestyle EP in 1996 on Freskanova (Freskanova's parent label, Fresh, had released Cantor and Harvey's previous works). When playing live, the group consisted of Cantor and Harvey on keyboards and programming, turntablist Jason Tunbridge (Mad Doctor X), guitarist (Tony Ayiotou), drummer Clive Jenner, bass guitarist Joe Henson, MC Navigator and Tenor Fly and three breakdancers (Coza, Marat, Lil'Tim).

The band released their first album, We Rock Hard, in 1998. The single "B-Boy Stance" became a hit in the UK in 1998, featuring the contributions of rapper Tenor Fly. In 1999, the Freestylers enjoyed success in the U.S. with the track "Don't Stop", which reached number 8 in the Billboard dance charts, and the video for "Here We Go" becoming a hit on a MTV. We Rock Hard sold well in the US, selling over 150,000 copies and reaching the top 30 on the Billboard Heatseekers chart.

Following the success of B-Boy Stance, the band were asked to remix tracks by Audioweb, Afrika Bambaataa and the Jungle Brothers as well as a big beat compilation album FSUK 2 and a Radio 1 Essential Mix featuring Beenie Man, Public Enemy, Whodini and The Fall.

The Freestylers released a mix album, Electro Science, in 2000. Their second album, Pressure Point, was released in 2001 with the track "Get Down Massive (featuring Navigator)" reaching number 16 on the Billboard dance charts in 2002.

During 2002 and 2003, the group began releasing singles under the alias Raw As Fuck, which later became the title of their third studio album. Released in 2004, it featured the single "Push Up", which reached the top 30 in the UK and the top 3 in Australia. The song "Get A Life", which was released as the album's first single, was re-released and reached the top 20 in Australia.

=== Adventures in Freestyle (2006) and current activity ===
Released in 2006 album Adventures in Freestyle experimented with a variety of styles, and saw the Freestylers working with assorted underground vocalists.

In 2008, the song "Jump 'n' Twist" from their fourth studio album "Adventures in Freestyle" was featured in the soundtrack for Tiger Woods PGA Tour 2008.

In 2010 the remixes of "Cracks" (originally from the Past, Present and Future E.P.) was released through Never Say Die Records. The Flux Pavilion remix received 25 million hits on YouTube.

CTRL-Z, hailing from Hammersmith and individually known as DJ Dash (Tom Petais) & DJ Inch (Nicky D’Silva), have been very involved with The Freestylers' music. In 2009, their remake of "Ruffneck" (renamed "Ruffneck '09") became the first ever release of the Never Say Die Records label. They also remixed "Security" in 2007 and "Cracks" in 2010. CTRL-Z has also co-produced songs with The Freestylers, such as "Turn to Dust" from the Adventures in Freestyle album.

In 2012, Freestylers signed with Black Hole Recordings subsidiary Rub-A-Duck Records. Through the label, they have released singles such as "Frozen" and "Over You", as well as their last album The Coming Storm in 2013. 2012 also saw new member Chris Bishop (Screwface from Stereo:Type) joining the production team. It is their first full-length release through the Black Hole Recordings subsidiary Rub-A-Duck. Throughout the album, the Freestylers showcase their ever-eclectic style and renegade approach to production focusing on everything in the bass music spectrum, including drum and bass, dubstep, speed garage and acid house, while also not shying away from their well-known hip-hop/breakbeat style. The album features collaborations with various artists such as Stereo:Type, Wizard (a frequent collaborator with DJ Deekline), SirReal, Laura Steel, Irwin Sparkes, Takura Tendayi, Synikall and hiphouse legend Fast Eddie. Through their SoundCloud page, the track "Calling Me Home" (featuring D.V.) was released as a free download to promote the release of the album and its title single. Later, a remix competition for "The Coming Storm" was held to celebrate the launch of the new album at Subsound, Liverpool. They have also released their own VIP mix of the track.

Since the release of their album "The Coming Storm" the band have been releasing their new material on Instant Vibes partially owned by Krafty Kuts. The single "Rude Bwoy" features Jamaican dancehall artist RDX.

== Discography ==
=== Albums ===
Year	Album details	Peak chart positions				
Year	Album details	UK	AUS	BEL	FRA	NLD
We Rock Hard	Released: 14 June 1998; Label: Freskanova; Formats: CD	33	—	—	—	73
Pressure Point	Released: 2001; Label: Freskanova; Formats: CD	—	—	—	115	—
Raw as F**k	Released: 5 July 2004; Label: PIAS; Formats: CD	130	66	66	180	44
Adventures in Freestyle	Released: 2 October 2006; Label: PIAS; Formats: CD	—	—	—	—	—
The Coming Storm	Released: 10 June 2013; Label: Rub-A-Duck; Formats: CD	—	—	—	—	—
Other Worlds	Released: 21 July 2021; Label: Mama's Pie; Formats: LP/CD	—	—	—	—	—

=== DJ mixes/compilations ===
- Essential Mix (BBC Radio 1) (1998)
- FSUK2 (1998)
- Rough Technique Vol. 1 (1998)
- Electro Science (2000)
- FabricLive.19 (2004)
- A Different Story Vol. 1 (2007)

=== Singles/EPs ===
Title	Year	Peak chart positions					Album
Title	Year	UK	AUS	BEL	NLD	NZL	Album
"B-Boy Stance" (featuring Tenor Fly)	1998	23	—	—	—	—	We Rock Hard
"Ruffneck" (featuring Navigator)	1998	—	—	—	23	—	We Rock Hard
"Warning" (featuring Navigator)	1998	68	—	—	—	—	We Rock Hard
"Here We Go" (featuring Definition of Sound)	1999	45	—	—	—	—	We Rock Hard
"Don't Stop"	2000	—	—	—	—	—	We Rock Hard
"Told You So" (featuring Petra)	2001	—	100	—	—	—	Pressure Point
"Get Down Massive" (featuring Navigator)	2001	172	—	—	—	—	Pressure Point
"Weekend Song" (featuring Tenor Fly)	2002	—	—	—	—	—	Pressure Point
"Now Is the Time" / "Blowin Ya Brainz"	2002	—	—	—	—	—	Pressure Point
"Get a Life"	2004	66	15	60	82	—	Raw as F**k
"Push Up"	2004	22	2	1	4	5	Raw as F**k
"Boom Blast" (featuring Million Dan)	2005	75	—	—	—	—	Raw as F**k
"Painkiller" (featuring Pendulum and Sirreal)	2006	117	—	—	—	—	Adventures in Freestyle
"In Love with You"	2006	—	40	—	—	—	Adventures in Freestyle
"Electrified" (featuring Bad Manner, Sirreal, Ragman and Ayak)	2007	—	—	—	—	—	Adventures in Freestyle
"Security"	2007	—	—	—	—	—	Adventures in Freestyle
"Dynamite Love" (with Krafty Kuts and Dynamite MC)	2008	—	—	—	—	—	Non-album singles
"Push Up Word Up"	2008	—	—	—	—	—	Non-album singles
"Cracks" (featuring Belle Humble)	2010	—	—	—	—	—	Non-album singles
"Over You" (featuring Ami Carmine)	2011	—	—	—	—	—	Non-album singles
"The Coming Storm" (with Stereo:Type featuring Takura)	2013	—	—	—	—	—	The Coming Storm
"You and What Army"	2013	—	—	—	—	—	The Coming Storm
"Falling" (featuring Laura Steel)	2014	—	—	105	—	—	The Coming Storm
"The Sound" (featuring Fast Eddie)	2014	—	—	—	—	—	The Coming Storm
"Fall Down"	2015	—	—	—	—	—	Non-album singles
"Rude Bwoy" (featuring RDX)	2015	—	—	—	—	—	Non-album singles
