= RDX (disambiguation) =

RDX is an explosive.

RDX may also refer to:

== Science and technology ==
- Radixin, a protein encoded by the RDX gene
- RDX register, a CPU register in 64-bit x86 processors
- RDX (disk), a data storage format

== Media and entertainment ==
- RDX (band), a reggae duo from Kingston, Jamaica
- RDX Love, a 2019 Indian Telugu-language film directed by Shankar Bhanu
- RDX (film), a 2023 Indian Malayalam-language film directed by Nahas Hidayath
- Ranvir Dhanraj Xaja "RDX Bhai", a fictional criminal in the 2007 Indian film Welcome

== Other uses ==
- Acura RDX, a 2006–present Japanese compact SUV
- Reaction Dynamics (company), a space company
