= NordSpace =

Canadian aerospace company

- Type: Private
- Industry: Aerospace
- Founded: 2022; 4 years ago
- Founder: Rahul Goel
- Headquarters: Markham, Ontario, Canada
- Key people: Rahul Goel (CEO)
- Products: Taiga, Tundra launch vehicles; Athena satellite bus
- Services: Launch services, suborbital research flights
- Website: www.nordspace.com

NordSpace is a Canadian aerospace company specializing in the development of small launch vehicles and satellite systems. The company is developing the Taiga suborbital launch vehicle and the Tundra orbital launch vehicle, as well as the Athena satellite bus. NordSpace is also developing a commercial launch site in Newfoundland and Labrador known as the Atlantic Spaceport Complex.

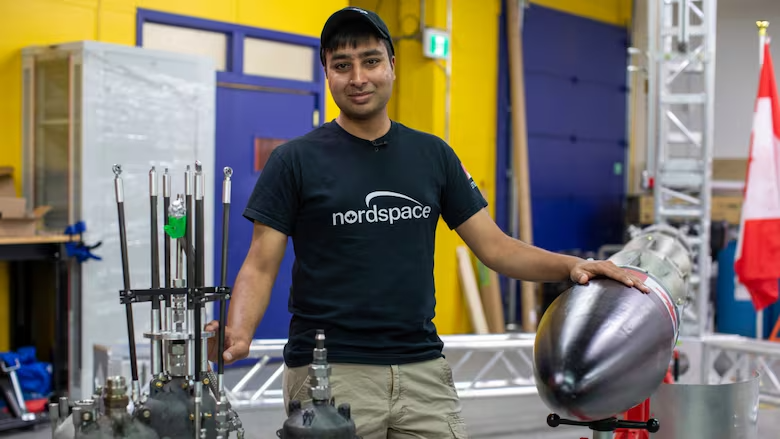
NordSpace was founded by Rahul Goel in 2022

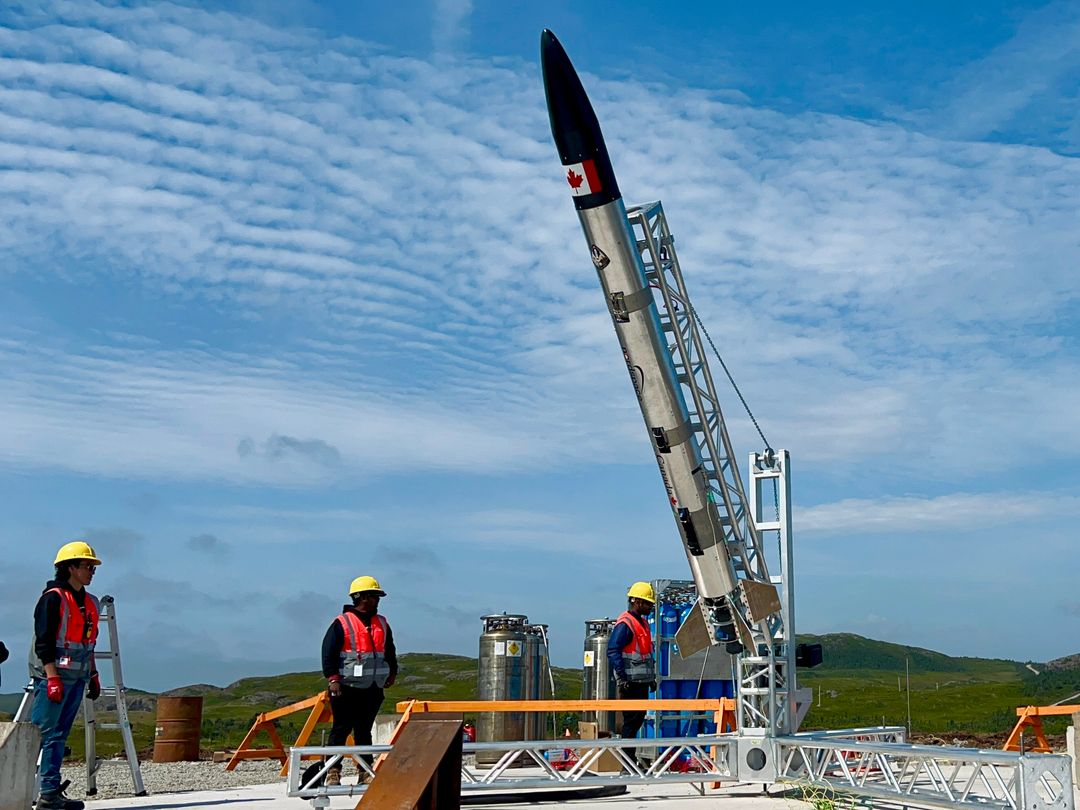
Taiga Rocket at the Atlantic Spaceport Complex in August 2025

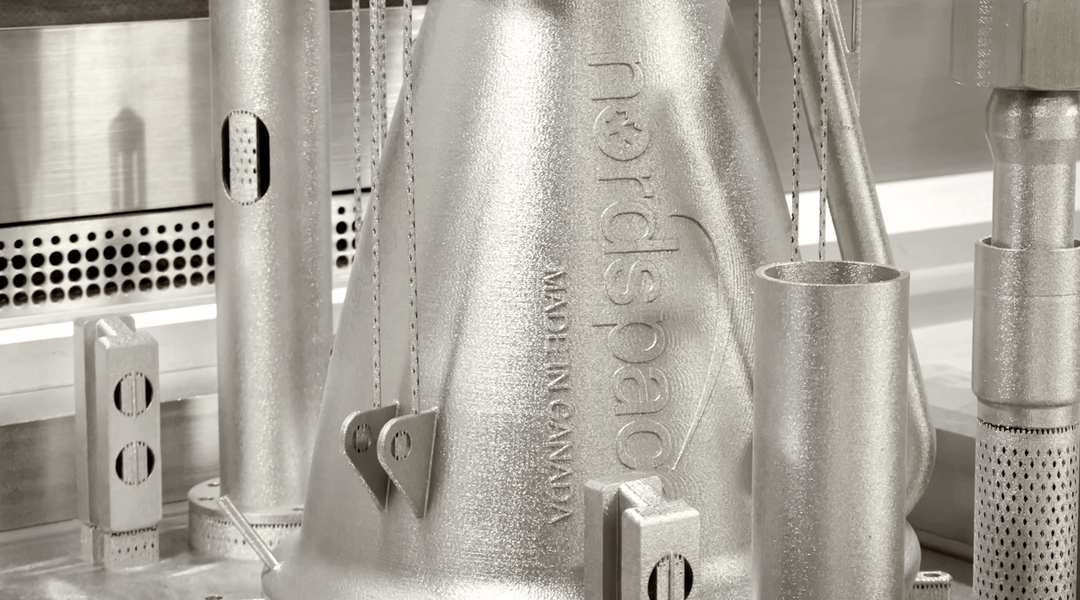
The Hadfield rocket engine is made in Markham, Ontario

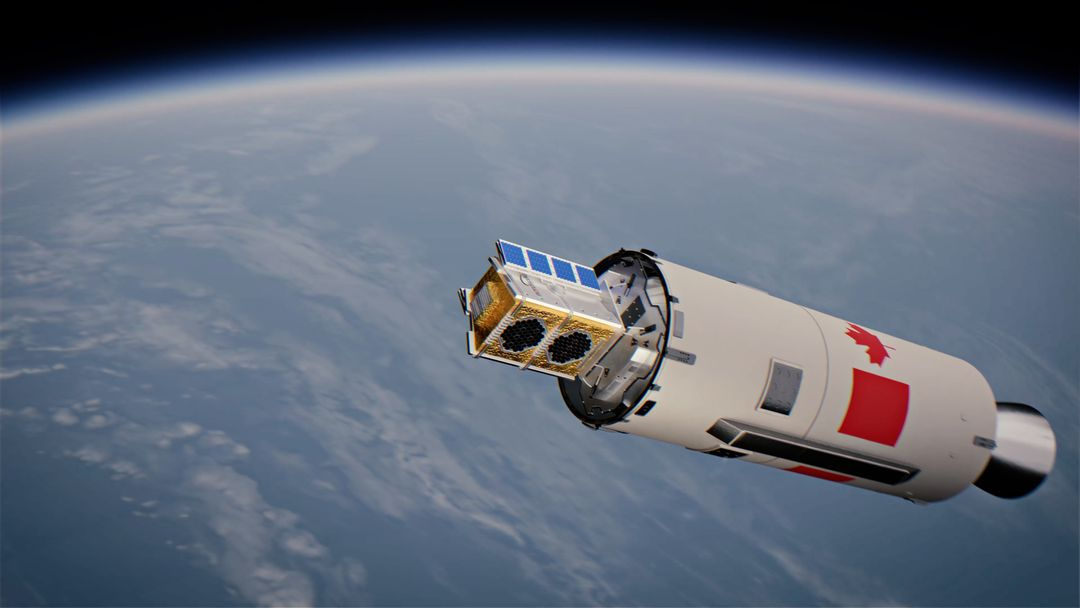
Render of NordSpace's Tundra Orbital Launch Vehicle deploying satellite in low Earth orbit

== History ==
NordSpace was founded in 2022 in Markham, Ontario by entrepreneur Rahul Goel. Goel previously founded the event management platform PheedLoop and invested approximately CA$5,000,000 of personal capital into NordSpace.

In March 2025, NordSpace announced the Supersonic and Hypersonic Applications Research Platform (SHARP) program, which includes the SHARP Arrow unmanned aircraft, the SHARP Sabre rocket-based platform, and the M2S-HyRock rocket engine.

In August 2025, the company broke ground on the Atlantic Spaceport Complex in Newfoundland and Labrador.

NordSpace conducted a launch campaign for its Taiga rocket in August 2025 from St. Lawrence, Newfoundland and Labrador. Launch attempts were delayed due to weather and technical issues, including a ground safety system fault, and no launch occurred during the campaign.

== Launch vehicles ==
NordSpace is developing small launch vehicles for suborbital and orbital missions.

=== Taiga ===
Taiga is a suborbital launch vehicle intended for research and technology demonstration payloads. The vehicle is used as a test platform for propulsion systems and flight technologies. As of October 2026, no launch attempts of the Taiga have been successful, and none are currently planned for the future.

=== Tundra ===
Tundra is an orbital launch vehicle under development, with a reusable first stage, intended to deliver small satellites to orbit. It is currently in development by the company and will be powered by Nordspace's own 3D-printed Hadfield and Garneau rocket engines. Tundra will be portable and able to be launched from land or at sea. The company claims the rocket will be able to place payloads up to 1,100 kg to low Earth orbit (LEO) and will cost roughly $10,000 / kg to LEO. The rocket will also be compatible with carbon-neutral sustainable-aviation fuels.

== Satellites ==
In 2026, the company plans to launch its first satellite Terra Nova.

== Rocket engines ==
NordSpace develops rocket engines using additive manufacturing techniques.

=== Hadfield engine ===
The Hadfield Mk III engine is a 3D-printed rocket engine developed by NordSpace and used on the Taiga vehicle during its 2025 launch campaign.

=== M2S-HyRock ===
The M2S-HyRock is a 3D-printed rocket engine introduced as part of the SHARP program.

== Launch infrastructure ==
NordSpace is developing the Atlantic Spaceport Complex in Newfoundland and Labrador to support future launch operations.

== Launch history ==
NordSpace launch history
Date	Vehicle	Outcome	Notes
29 August 2025	Taiga	No launch	First launch attempt scrubbed at 11:45 a.m. NDT due to loss of power to quick-disconnect mechanism from generator issue
29 August 2025	Taiga	No launch	Second attempt: engine ignition achieved at 18:38 NDT, but automatic misfire detection system shut down engine; later determined to be a false trigger

== See also ==
- Maritime Launch Services
- Atlantic Spaceport Complex
- Reaction Dynamics
