= Jungle Revolution =

Studio album by Congo Natty
- Released: 1 July 2013
- Length: 47:10
- Label: Big Dada
- Producer: Congo Natty

Congo Natty chronology
Born Again (2005)	Jungle Revolution (2013)	Jungle Revolution in Dub (2015)

Jungle Revolution is a studio album by English musician Michael West under the pseudonym Congo Natty. It was released on 1 July 2013, through Big Dada. It received generally favorable reviews from critics.

== Background ==
Michael West has released his music under the pseudonyms Rebel MC, Conquering Lion, Blackstar, and Congo Natty. He is also known as Mikail Tafari. Jungle Revolution is West's first studio album release on Big Dada. It includes contributions from Adrian Sherwood and Skip McDonald.

A remix version of the album, titled Jungle Revolution in Dub, was later released in 2015.

== Critical reception ==
Professional ratings
Aggregate scores
Source	Rating
Metacritic	72/100
Review scores
Source	Rating
AllMusic	4/5 stars
Clash	8/10
Exclaim!	8/10
The Irish Times	4/5 stars
MusicOMH	3/5 stars
The Observer	3/5 stars
The Skinny	3/5 stars

According to the review aggregator Metacritic, Jungle Revolution received "generally favorable reviews" based on a weighted average score of 72 out of 100 from 9 critic scores.

Sam Wiseman of The Skinny commented that "the LP is mostly a straightforward blend of classic jungle breaks and Rastafarian vibes." He added, "Jungle Revolution may not herald a new century, but it's a concise, infectious mashup of some of the most vital genres that emerged from 90s club music." James Williams of Exclaim! stated, "The 150-bpm ragga bangers that we all know and love are present and correct, alongside more roots-based tracks and sub-heavy workouts, but the fantastic thing about Jungle Revolution is the feeling of the torch being passed to the new generation." He described it as "an LP that manages to look forward while honouring the past simultaneously, which is no mean feat these days." David Jeffries of AllMusic stated, "Bits of television and movie dialog work themselves in and out of the extremely busy mix, but On-U Sound's Adrian Sherwood is well in charge of the mix, and with Skip McDonald guest starring on guitar, this one is top veteran stuff."

=== Accolades ===
Year-end lists for Jungle Revolution
Publication	List	Rank	Ref.
PopMatters	The Best Electronic Music of 2013	19	

== Track listing ==
Jungle Revolution track listing
No.	Title	Writer(s)	Length
1.	"Jungle Souljah"	M. Tafari; M. Kean	4:06
2.	"UK Allstars" (Congo Natty meets Benny Page mix)	M. Tafari; J. Sutter; A. Codrington; P. Levy; A. Henry; D. Bent; F. Nelson	4:54
3.	"Revolution"	M. Tafari; O. Chinangwa	4:57
4.	"Get Ready"	M. Tafari; N. Weir; T. Cowan	5:22
5.	"Jah Warriors" (Congo Natty meets Vital Elements mix)	M. Tafari; M. Hull	4:47
6.	"Nu Beginingz"	M. Tafari; M. Lamont	3:26
7.	"Jungle Is I and I" (Congo Natty meets Vital Elements mix)	M. Tafari; C. Williams; G. Warnock	4:13
8.	"London Dungeons" (Congo Natty meets Boyson and Crooks mix)	M. Tafari; M. Kean; J. Boyson; S. Crooks	5:20
9.	"Rebel"	M. Tafari; L. J. Blair	4:27
10.	"Micro Chip (Say No)"	M. Tafari; P. Hibbert; K. Tafari	5:36
Total length:			47:10

== Personnel ==
Credits adapted from liner notes.

- Congo Natty (Rebel MC) – vocals, guitar (10), drums (10), production, mixing

Additional musicians

- La La – vocals (1)
- The Boo Ya – vocals (1)
- Ras Asheber – drums (1)
- Dunc the Trump – horns (1)
- Steve Finnerty – guitar (1, 3, 8)
- General Levy – vocals (2)
- Tippa Irie – vocals (2)
- Sweetie Irie – vocals (2)
- Top Cat – vocals (2)
- Tenor Fly – vocals (2, 4)
- Daddy Freddy – vocals (2, 4)
- Nanci Correia – vocals (3, 4, 5), additional vocals (7, 8, 10)
- Phoebe Hibbert – vocals (3, 10)
- Ras Buggsy – vocals (3)
- Quake – drums (3)
- Crispy Horns – horns (3)
- Skip McDonald – guitar (3, 6, 7, 9), melodica (3)
- Yosief Tafari – vocals (5)
- Yared Colour Code – guitar (5)
- Raziel Amlak – bass guitar (5)
- Sista Mary – vocals (6)
- Princess Lydia Tafari – additional vocals (7, 10)
- Princess Trinity Tafari – additional vocals (7, 10)
- Martha Kean – vocals (8)
- Fish – bass guitar (8, 10)
- 2Nice – vocals (9)
- Kaya Fyah – vocals (10)
- Redz – guitar (10)
- Robin – guitar (10)
- Biscuit – flute (10)

Technical personnel

- Benny Page – remix (2)
- Serial Killerz – additional production (4)
- Vital Elements – remix (5, 7)
- Boyson and Crooks – remix (8)
- Greg Wizard – additional programming, engineering
- Graham Warnock – additional programming, engineering
- Jahkey Murder – additional programming, engineering
- Mathew Smyth – additional programming, engineering
- Dave McEwen – engineering
- Adrian Sherwood – mixing
- Kevin Metcalfe – mastering
- Spencer Murphy – photography
- Oscar & Ewan – design

== Charts ==
Chart performance for Jungle Revolution
Chart (2013)	Peak position
UK Independent Albums (OCC)	41
