= List of airports in the St. John's area =

Location in Newfoundland

The following active airports serve the area around St. John's, Newfoundland and Labrador, Canada. Airport names in italics are part of the National Airports System.

Airport name	ICAO/TC LID (IATA)	Location	Coordinates
Atlantic Spaceport Complex		St. Lawrence	46.9016986°N 55.3534819°W
Bell Island Airport	CCV4	Bell Island	47°38′06″N 52°58′48″W
Cape St. Francis Heliport		Cape St. Francis	47°48′34″N 52°47′09″W
Harbour Grace Airport	CHG2	Harbour Grace	47°41′08″N 53°15′14″W
Health Sciences Centre Heliport	CCK2	St. John's	47°34′21″N 52°44′44″W
Hebron Heliport	CHO9	Grand Banks	46°32′38″N 48°29′53″W
Hibernia Heliport	CHO7	Grand Banks	46°45′02″N 48°46′59″W
Long Pond Heliport	CCX2	Foxtrap	47°30′58″N 52°58′51″W
Dobbin Residence Heliport		Portugal Cove	47°37′06″N 52°52′08″W
SeaRose Heliport		Grand Banks	46°47′19″N 48°00′54″W
Paddy's Pond Water Aerodrome	CCQ5	St. John's	47°28′09″N 52°53′30″W
St. John's International Airport	CYYT (YYT)	St. John's	47°37′07″N 52°45′09″W
Terra Nova Heliport		Grand Banks	46°28′30″N 48°28′46″W
Universal Heliport	CDC2	St. John's	47°36′30″N 52°43′37″W
West White Rose Heliport		Grand Banks	46°42′00″N 48°50′00″W

== Defunct airports ==
Airport name	ICAO/TC LID (IATA)	Location	Coordinates
Lester's Field		St. John's	47°33′27″N 052°43′13″W
Janeway Children's Hospital Heliport		St. John's	47°35′23″N 052°41′18″W
McAndrew Air Force Base		Argentia	47°17′09″N 053°58′53″W
Naval Station Argentia	CWAR (NWP)	Argentia	47°18′22″N 053°59′24″W
Pepperrell Air Force Base		St. John's	47°35′10″N 052°41′31″W
Trepassey Water Aerodrome		Trepassey	46°44′07″N 053°22′16″W

== See also ==
- List of airports in Newfoundland and Labrador
