= Ruffneck =

Ruffneck may refer to:

- Ruffneck (band), a house music group from New Jersey
- "Ruffneck" (song), a song by MC Lyte
- "Ruffneck (Full Flex)", a song by Skrillex from the EP More Monsters and Sprites
  - "Ruffneck (Flex)", another song from the EP
- "Ruffneck", a song by the Freestylers from the album We Rock Hard

== See also ==
- Patrick van Kerckhoven, known as DJ Ruffneck
- Roughneck, slang for a labourer
