= Tuff Jam =

British DJ, music production and remixing duo

- Origin: London, England
- Genres: UK garage, house
- Occupation(s): Record producers, remixers, DJs
- Years active: 1993–present
- Labels: Casa Trax, Fifty First Recordings, Unda-Vybe, i! Records, 2tuf4u Records
- Members: Karl Brown; Matt Lamont

Tuff Jam are a British DJ, music production and remixing duo consisting of Karl 'Tuff Enuff' Brown and Matt 'Jam' Lamont. They began working together in 1993, and were instrumental in developing the UK garage sound. They presented a radio show on London's Kiss 100 from 1997 until 2000.

== Biography ==
Karl 'Tuff Enuff' Brown and Matt 'Jam' Lamont began working together in 1993 after meeting at the London club The Arches, where Lamont had a DJ residency. Brown had previously been in the group Double Trouble, who enjoyed chart success with singles such as "Street Tuff".

They are described as having a "pivotal involvement in the development of the UK underground garage scene." They presented a radio show on London's Kiss FM from 1997 until 2000. Their 1998 single "Need Good Love" reached No. 44 on the UK Singles Chart.

Lamont continues to DJ, whilst Brown launched a record label, 2tuf4u in 2002.

They have produced and remixed an extensive back-catalogue of UK garage releases over the years, as well as mixing several compilations.

In 2013, Tuff Jam appeared alongside many other garage pioneers in a documentary exploring the legacy of UK garage, Rewind 4Ever: The History of UK Garage.

== Discography ==
=== Singles and EPs ===
- "Spread Love" (feat. Q-Rius) (1995), Casa Trax
- The Experience EP (1995), Fifty First
- Tuff Jams Vol. 1 (1995), New York Soundclash Records
- Unda-Vibes Vol. 1 (with Large Boy) (1995), Casa Trax
- "Set It Off" (1996), Fifty First
- "Experience" (1996), Fifty First
- "Let Me Tell You" (1996), Dansa
- "Feel My Love" (as The Jam Experience) / "Track No Name" (1997), Unda-Vybe
- "Dangerous" (feat. Mr. X) (1997), Unda-Vybe
- "Just Gets Better" (feat. Xavier) (1997), Catch
- "Tumblin' Down" (feat. Xavier) (1997), Mucho Soul
- "Need Good Love" (1998), Locked On - UK No. 44
- "Reach On Up" (feat. Michael Watford) (1999), Unda-Vybe
- Wanting Jesus / Share Your Love / One Day (with Todd Edwards) (1999), i! Records
- "Key Dub" (1999), i! Records
- "So Excited (Part One)" (feat. Pepper Mashay) (2004), 2tuf4u

=== Mixes/compilations ===
- Havin' It Stateside II (1996), Havin' It Records
- Underground Frequencies Volumes 1/2 (1997 & 1998), Satellite
- Speed Garage: The Underground Sound of London (1998), Urban Tracks
