= We Rock Hard =

Studio album by Freestylers
- Released: 14 June 1998
- Genres: Breakbeat, big beat, electronic
- Length: 73:05
- Labels: Freskanova (UK); PIAS; Mammoth (US)
- Producer: Freestylers

Freestylers chronology
We Rock Hard (1998)	Pressure Point (2001)

Singles from We Rock Hard
- 1. "B-Boy Stance" Released: 1998; 2. "Ruffneck" Released: 1998; 3. "Warning" Released: 1998; 4. "Here We Go" Released: 1999; 5. "Don't Stop" Released: 2000

We Rock Hard is the debut album by the English electronic group Freestylers. It was their most commercially successful release to date. AllMusic describes the album as a run through of the band members' back catalogue, but it still showcases the classic big beat and breakbeat electronica that would remain the band's trademark sound along with ragga and dub twists.

The album features the single "Ruffneck", which garnered MTV rotation.

Before the album's release, Freestylers released the Adventures in Freestyle EP in 1997, which featured three tracks: "B-Boy Stance", "Feel the Panic" and "Breaker Beats (Part Two)". The EP was withdrawn from circulation because the first two songs contained uncleared samples of "Wonderwall" by Oasis (sung by Tenor Fly) and "Walk This Way" by Aerosmith.

== Critical reception ==
Professional ratings
Review scores
Source	Rating
AllMusic	4/5 stars
NME	7/10
Rolling Stone	3/5 stars
Select	4/5 stars

The Guardian noted: "They've got tunes like the British breaks scene has never had tunes, which gives their superb productions a sweetness grievously lacking at the more ascetic end of breakbeat."

== Track listing ==
No.	Title	Length
1.	"Freestyle Noize"	5:37
2.	"Dancehall Vibes" (featuring Tenor Fly)	6:21
3.	"Drop the Boom"	3:01
4.	"Don't Stop"	4:43
5.	"Here We Go" (featuring Definition of Sound)	4:51
6.	"The Darkside"	4:50
7.	"B–Boy Stance" (featuring Tenor Fly) (scratches by Funk Wizard Jay Rock)	4:36
8.	"We Rock Hard" (featuring Soul Sonic Force)	7:08
9.	"Breaker Beats (Part 1)"	2:54
10.	"Breaker Beats (Part 2)"	2:57
11.	"Scratch 22 (Jay-Rock's Theme)" (produced by Funk Wizard Jay Rock)	5:25
12.	"Ruffneck" (featuring Navigator) (scratches by Funk Wizard Jay Rock)	5:40
13.	"Feel the Panic"	5:54
14.	"Hold Up Your Hands"	3:58
15.	"Warning" (featuring Navigator) (scratches by Funk Wizard Jay Rock)	5:10

1999 US release
No.	Title	Length
1.	"Freestyle Noize"	5:36
2.	"Dancehall Vibes" (featuring Tenor Fly)	6:17
3.	"Drop the Boom"	3:01
4.	"Don't Stop"	4:20
5.	"Here We Go" (featuring Definition of Sound)	4:56
6.	"B–Boy Stance" (featuring Tenor Fly) (scratches by Funk Wizard Jay Rock)	4:21
7.	"We Rock Hard" (featuring Soul Sonic Force)	7:10
8.	"Breaker Beats (Part 1)"	4:36
9.	"Spaced Invader"	7:19
10.	"Ruffneck" (featuring Navigator) (scratches by Funk Wizard Jay Rock)	5:43
11.	"Feel the Panic"	5:57
12.	"Check the Skillz"	7:10
13.	"Warning" (featuring Navigator) (scratches by Funk Wizard Jay Rock)	4:57
Total length:		1:11:23

- The female vocals on track 4 "Don't Stop" are sampled from the 1976 song "I Know" by Candi Staton.
- The 1999 US release omits the tracks "The Darkside", "Breaker Beats (Part 2)", "Scratch 22 (Jay-Rock's Theme)" and "Hold Up Your Hands" and includes "Spaced Invader" and "Check the Skillz" (from the B-sides of the singles "Ruffneck" and "B-Boy Stance", respectively).
