= T-Minus Engineering =

Dutch aerospace launch vehicle company

- Type: Private company
- Industry: Aerospace
- Founded: 2011
- Founders: Roel Eerkens, Mark Uitendaal, Hein Olthof and Eric Smit
- Headquarters: Delft, Netherlands
- Website: https://www.t-minus.nl/

T-Minus Engineering is a Dutch aerospace company headquartered in Delft, specializing in suborbital sounding rockets. Founded in 2011, the company offers commercial suborbital platforms for scientific research, commercial applications, and national security solutions.

They were ranked the 5th Top European Launch Company by European Spaceflight of 2025.

== History ==
T-Minus Engineering was founded in 2011 in Delft by Roel Eerkens, Mark Uitendaal, Hein Olthof and Eric Smit, with the objective of developing high-quality suborbital rockets at an affordable cost.

== Projects ==
=== CanSat Launcher ===
The launcher stands at 3.17 metres and can deploy 6 CanSats at an altitude in an excess of 1 kilometre.

=== DART ===
The DART sounding rocket stands at 3.5 metres and can reach a maximum altitude of 200 kilometres. It features a payload compartment with maximum payload volume of 30 x 250 mm, and is capable of carrying payloads of up to 1.5 - 2 kilograms in its glass fibre hull payload compartment.

The DART was first launched on 19 September 2020 from Koonibba Rocket Range in South Australia, reaching an altitude of 85km. The DART was unsuccessfully launched from Andøya, Norway on 3 October 2021, with failure to separate the payload. The DART was unsuccessfully launched from Koonibba Rocket Range on 29 August, failing to reach target altitude. The DART was launched from Esrange Space Center in February 2024, but after successful liftoff an anomaly occurred resulting in the early deployment of the mission’s payload. A second launch occurred from Esrange Space Center in April 2025, and was successful.

A future launch from SUAS Aerospace in Ireland is planned.

=== Kingfisher ===
The Kingfisher rocket was successfully launched from MOD Hebrides Range in October 2022, reaching 185km.

=== Barracuda ===
Unveiled in 2022 with a 200mm diameter solid rocket motor, the Barracuda was designed to be capable of carrying payloads to a 200km apogee. The completed sounding rocket is a single-stage, solid fuel suborbital vehicle that stands approximately 4 metres tall. It features a payload compartment measuring 1000 millimetres, and can carry payloads of up to 40 kilograms to altitudes reaching 120 kilometres.

Prior to April 2025, T-Minus stated that they had not performed any launches for civil applications with the Barracuda. In June 2025, Maritime Launch Services claimed that the Barracuda had been launched many times before outside of North America. The Barracuda launched from Spaceport Nova Scotia in November 2025 and June 2026. In both launches, after successful liftoff the Barracuda suffered anomalies late in the boost phase and failed to reach the Karman-line.

Another launch from Spaceport Nova Scotia is expected in fall 2026.
