= Rebel Music (Rebel MC album) =

Studio album by Rebel MC
- Released: 1990
- Label: Desire
- Producers: Rebel MC; Double Trouble; Smith & Mighty; Simon Law; Longsy D; Dynamic Guvnors

Rebel MC chronology
Rebel Music (1990)	Black Meaning Good (1991)

Rebel Music is the debut album by British rapper and producer Rebel MC, released in 1990 on Desire Records.

== Critical reception ==
Professional ratings
Review scores
Source	Rating
AllMusic	3/5 stars
Robert Christgau	(choice cut)

The St. Petersburg Times noted that "Rebel Music is charming and straightforward, although its actual rebelliousness quota amounts to little more than advocating occasional jaywalking."

== Singles ==
The album contains four singles which charted in several countries: "Just Keep Rockin'" (with Double Trouble; UK No. 11, Belgium No. 14, Netherlands No. 3), "Street Tuff" (also with Double Trouble; UK No. 3, Australia No. 85, Belgium No. 7, Netherlands No. 3, New Zealand No. 29, Sweden No. 12), "Better World" (UK No. 20, Belgium No. 22, Netherlands No. 14, New Zealand No. 4) and the title track "Rebel Music" (UK No. 53, Netherlands No. 84, New Zealand No. 15).

== Track listing ==
No.	Title	Writer(s)	Length
1.	"Just Keep Rockin'" (Sk'ouse Mix; with Double Trouble)	Michael West; Leigh Guest; Michael Menson	5:42
2.	"Street Tuff" (Scar Mix; with Double Trouble)	West; Guest; Menson	3:30
3.	"Music Is the Key"	West	4:27
4.	"Love?"	West	3:38
5.	"Storytime"	West; Guest; Menson	4:10
6.	"MC²" (featuring Clement Irie)	West; Irie	4:48
7.	"Better World"	West	3:42
8.	"Rebel Music"	West; Simon Law; Ross Anderson	5:12
9.	"Commin' Brand New" (featuring MC Kinki)	West; Caron Geary; Andrew Long	5:14
10.	"Set Yourself Free"	West; Joseph Tunbridge; D. Kidd	5:02
11.	"Cockney Rhythm" (Remix)	West; Guest; Menson	4:59

CD bonus tracks
No.	Title	Writer(s)	Length
12.	"Better World" (Peace Mix)	West	4:59
13.	"Better World" (Unity Mix)	West	4:44

== Charts ==
Chart performance for Rebel Music
Chart (1990)	Peak position
Dutch Albums (Album Top 100)	54
New Zealand Albums (RMNZ)	9
Swedish Albums (Sverigetopplistan)	40
UK Albums (Official Charts)	18
