= Mad Doctor X =

British DJ

- Birth name: Frederick Jason Carter
- Also known as: DJ Jason, Jazzy Jason, Jay Rock, London Funk Allstars, DJ Toolz, Clusterfunk
- Origin: London, England
- Genres: Hip hop
- Occupation: DJ

Jason Carter, better known by the stage name Mad Doctor X (also known as DJ Jason, Jazzy Jason, Jay Rock, London Funk Allstars, DJ Toolz and Clusterfunk) is a British DJ.

== Biography ==
Carter ran the Blapps! Records label, which released several records from 1988–1992 that were club hits in the Baltimore area, as well as in the British rave scene. "Don't Hold Back", "Too Much Energy", and "Let the Freak" were sampled and played heavily by DJs and producers in the Baltimore club scene. The label had two sublabels: Pure Bhoomie and Ruff Lick Records. Carter also released a mini album on d-zone records under the pseudonym "Turntable Symphony" after striking up a friendship with the owner of d-zone, andré jacobs and regularly appearing on his radio show on Pulse FM.

Carter and Aston Harvey of Freestylers formed Blapps Posse, a production team active in the late 1980s and early 1990s. Their music combined house and hip hop influences, with strong bass lines and house breaks, fused with rap vocals and beats.

== Discography ==
=== Mad Doctor X/Blapps production ===
- Dynamic Guvnors - Rock The Discothèques (Blapps! Records 1988)
- Rebel MC - Set Yourself Free (Desire Records 1989)
- Blapps Posse - Don't Hold Back (Blapps! Records 1989)
- Blapps Posse - Don't Hold Back Remix (Blapps! Records 1990)
- Blapps Posse - Don't Hold Back '91 (TRIBAL BASS 1991)
- Turntable Symphony - Instructions Of Life (d-zone 1991)
- Turntable Symphony - It'll Make You Go (Ooh) (d-zone 1991)
- Turntable Symphony - Can't Stop (d-zone 1991)
- Turntable Symphony - Techno Love (d-zone 1991)
- Epitome Of Hype - Let The Freak (Big Life 1991)
- DJ Toolz - DJ Toolz Vol I (BLAPPS 1992)
- Clusterfunk - The Real Deal (mini LP) (Funkasaurus Records 1993)
- DJ Toolz - Breaks, Beats N Grooves Vol I (Ninja Tune 1993)
- DJ Toolz - Breaks, Beats N Grooves Vol II (Ninja Tune 1993)
- Clusterfunk - Do Me Right (Funkasaurus Records 1993)
- DJ Toolz - Breaks, Beats N Grooves Vol III (Ninja Tune 1993)
- William George - What's All The Fighting For (Funkasaurus Records 1994)
- Clusterfunk - Do Me Right (Cooltempo 1994)
- Clusterfunk - Inside (12') (Ninja Tune / Funkasaurus Records 1995)
- London Funk Allstars - Can Ya Understand (12') (Ninja Tune 1995)
- London Funk Allstars - London Funk Vol I (LP) (Ninja Tune 1995)
- London Funk Allstars - Sureshot (12') (Ninja Tune 1995)
- DJ Toolz - Breaks, Beats N Grooves Vol IV (LP) (Ninja Tune 1995)
- London Funk Allstars - Knee Deep In The Beats (12') (Ninja Tune 1996)
- Mad Doctor X - Mad Doctor X's Hip Hop Experiments Escape From The Lab And Go On The Rampage Vol I (LP) (Ninja Tune 1996)
- London Funk Allstars - Flesh Eating Disco Zombies Vs The Bionic Hookers From Mars (LP) (Ninja Tune 1996)
- Mad Doctor X - Real Heavy Science (10') (Freskanova 1997)
- Monty Props - Battle Beats Vol I (LP) (Freskanova 1997)
- Mad Doctor X - Picnic With The Greys (LP) (Freskanova 1997)
- Mad Doctor X - Hot Shit (Ill Remixes Vol II) (bootleg 1997)
- Freestylers - Scratch 22 (Jay-Rock's Theme) (Freskanova 1998)
- Quakes - Capital Visions (12' track) (Son Records 1998)
- William George - Sunshine (BLAPPS 1998)
- Mad Doctor X - The Picnic Revisited (EP) (Freskanova 1998)
- Mad Doctor X - Project X (EP) (Son Records 1998)
- Mad Doctor X - Project X Part II (EP) (Son Records 2000)
- Mad Doctor X - Chillonometry (LP) (Marble Bar (Japan) 2001)
- Mad Doctor X - 7even (Azzurro remix) (12' track) (Son Records (Japan) 2001)
- Mad Doctor X - Presents: Xtramentals Prescription 1 (Blapps! Records, Limited Edition LP)
- Kenny Dope & Mad Doctor X - Daily Troble EP (Marble Bar (Japan) 2006)

=== Remixes ===
- Bam Bam - Animal Attraction (Desire Records 1989)
- De La Soul - Ring Ring Ring (Big Life 1992)
- on-dré - work it out (d-zone 1993)
- Strike - I Have Peace (Fresh Music 1997)
- Sol Brothers - That Elvis Track (Fresh Music 1997)
- Freestylers - Warning (Freskanova 1998)
- Denki Groove - Parachute (KI/OON 1998)
- Freestylers - B-Boy Stance (Freskanova 1999)
- Quakes - Histoire De Q (Son Records 1999)
- Freestylers - Here We Go (Freskanova 1999)
- Angel Lee - What's Your Name (WEA 2000)
- SBK - Finally (Warner Music 2000)
- J Soul Brothers - Chaos (Rhythm Zone 2000)
- Resin Dogs - Hardgroove 2001 (HYDRAFUNK/Virgin Records 2001)
- Lagoon - Blue Lagoon (UMU 2001)

=== Featured turntablist ===
- Freestylers - B-Boy Stance (Freskanova, 1998)
- Various - FSUK Vol II (Ministry of Sound, 1998)
- Freestylers - Ruffneck (Freskanova, 1998)
- Various - Rough Technique (Freskanova, 1999)
- Electronic - Can't Find My Way Home (Parlophone, 1999)
- Various - Urban Theory Presents Electro Science (Urban Theory, 2000)
- Freestylers - Adventures In Freestyle (Against The Grain/Cortex, 2006)

=== Exclusive tracks ===
- "Jus Clap" on "Resin Dogs - Grinnin' (We Got Wot U Need)" (Hydrofunk Records, 1998)
- "Swimmer Girls" (Featuring Jo Morgan) on "Various - Hydrofunk Records Catalogue Mixer" (Ministry (Magazine) Australia, 2004)

== Reviews ==
- Chillonometry Review at ukhh.com
- Chillonometry Review at Independent.co.uk
- Project X Part II EP Review at ukhh.com
