= Better World =

1990 single by Rebel MC

Single by Rebel MC

from the album Rebel Music
- Released: 1990
- Length: 3:42
- Label: Desire
- Songwriter: Michael West
- Producer: Rebel MC

Rebel MC singles chronology
"Street Tuff" (1989)	"Better World" (1990)	"Culture" / "Comin' On Strong" (1990)

Audio
- "Everybody" on YouTube

"Better World" is a song by British music producer Rebel MC. Released in 1990, the song was later included on Rebel MC's debut album, Rebel Music (1990). Upon its release, "Better World" reached number 20 in the United Kingdom, number 10 in the Netherlands, and number four in New Zealand.

== Track listings ==
CD single

1. "Better World" (Peace radio mix)
2. "Better World" (Peace mix)
3. "Better World" (Unity mix)

Cassette single

A. "Better World" (Peace radio mix)
B. "Better World" (Unity mix)

7-inch single

A. "Better World" (Peace radio mix)
B. "Better World" (Unity radio mix)

12-inch single

A. "Better World" (Peace mix)
B. "Better World" (Unity mix)

== Charts ==
=== Weekly charts ===
Chart (1990)	Peak position
Australia (ARIA)	131
Belgium (Ultratop 50 Flanders)	22
Europe (Eurochart Hot 100)	48
Ireland (IRMA)	21
Netherlands (Dutch Top 40)	10
Netherlands (Single Top 100)	14
New Zealand (Recorded Music NZ)	4
Switzerland (Schweizer Hitparade)	21
UK Singles (Official Charts)	20

=== Year-end charts ===
Chart (1990)	Position
Netherlands (Dutch Top 40)	91
New Zealand (RIANZ)	21
