= Push Up (song) =

2004 single by Freestylers

Single by Freestylers

from the album Raw as F**k
- Released: 2004
- Length: 3:05
- Label: Against the Grain
- Songwriters: Aston Harvey; Matt Cantor; Theodorakis Brehony; Reza Safinia
- Producer: Freestylers

Freestylers singles chronology
"Get a Life" (2004)	"Push Up" (2004)	"Boom Blast" (2005)

"Push Up" is a single by the British electronic music group Freestylers. The song was co-written by Theo Brehony and Rez Safinia of the pop duo Heist and features vocals from Theo. Released in 2004, it reached number one in the Flanders region of Belgium for seven weeks, number two in Australia and the Netherlands, and number five in New Zealand. In the band's home country, "Push Up" reached number 22 on the UK Singles Chart and topped the UK Dance Singles Chart.

The song's music video was recorded in various parts of Central London, including Piccadilly Circus. It features Kate Eloise Whitfield in various outfits dancing on the streets near crowds of people. In 2008, the Freestylers mashed-up "Push Up" with the 1986 hit song "Word Up!" by Cameo and released it as "Push Up Word Up" through Data Records.

== Track listings ==
UK CD single

1. "Push Up" (radio edit)
2. "Push Up" (Plump DJ's remix)
3. "Push Up" (DJ Bomba & J Paolo remix)

UK and Belgian 12-inch single

A. "Push Up" (original)
B. "The Slammer" (Clipz remix)

UK and Belgian 12-inch single (Remixes)

1. "Push Up" (Plump DJ's remix)
2. "Push Up" (DJ Bomba & J Paolo remix)

Belgian CD single

1. "Push Up" (radio edit) – 3:55
2. "Push Up" (Plump DJ's remix) – 7:23

Belgian maxi-CD single

1. "Push Up" (radio edit) – 3:55
2. "Push Up" (original mix) – 5:45
3. "Push Up" (Plump DJ's remix) – 7:23
4. "Push Up" (DJ Bomba & J Paolo remix) – 7:25

Australian CD single

1. "Push Up" (radio edit)
2. "Push Up" (Plump DJ's remix)
3. "Push Up" (DJ Bomba & J Paolo remix)
4. "Push Up" (Poxy Music mix)

== Charts ==
=== Weekly charts ===
Chart (2004)	Peak position
Australia (ARIA)	2
Australian Club Chart (ARIA)	1
Australian Dance (ARIA)	1
Belgium (Ultratop 50 Flanders)	1
Belgium (Ultratop 50 Wallonia)	36
Hungary (Dance Top 40)	32
Netherlands (Dutch Top 40)	2
Netherlands (Single Top 100)	4
New Zealand (Recorded Music NZ)	5
Romania (Romanian Top 100)	48
Scotland Singles (Official Charts)	30
UK Singles (Official Charts)	22
UK Dance (Official Charts)	1
UK Indie (Official Charts)	3

=== Year-end charts ===
Chart (2004)	Position
Australia (ARIA)	52
Australian Club Chart (ARIA)	11
Australian Dance (ARIA)	4
Belgium (Ultratop 50 Flanders)	4
Netherlands (Dutch Top 40)	3
Netherlands (Single Top 100)	31

== Certifications ==
Region	Certification	Certified units/sales
Australia (ARIA)	Gold	35,000^{^}
^{^} Shipments figures based on certification alone.

== Release history ==
Region	Date	Format(s)	Label(s)	Ref.
Australia	2004	CD	Shock; Against the Grain	
United Kingdom	2004	CD; 12-inch vinyl	Against the Grain	
Australia	19 July 2004	12-inch vinyl	Shock; Against the Grain	
