= Michael Watford =

American dance music singer (1959–2024)

- Born: Michael Wayne Watford; July 20, 1959; Suffolk, Virginia, U.S.
- Died: January 26, 2024 (aged 64) Newark, New Jersey, U.S.
- Genres: Dance, house
- Occupation: Singer

Michael Wayne Watford (July 20, 1959 – January 26, 2024) was an American dance music singer, who was born in Virginia and raised in New Jersey. He was best known for his gospel-influenced vocals on house records throughout the 1990s and 2000s.

== Biography ==
Watford was born in Suffolk, Virginia, on July 20, 1959, and was raised in Newark, New Jersey. His mother was a minister in the African Methodist Episcopal Church and a gospel singer, and Watford's early musical experiences came from singing in church.

Watford's first single, "Holdin' On", was released in 1991. Four of his singles charted on the United States Hot Dance Music/Club Play chart in the mid-1990s, including "So into You" which hit number one in 1994. The same track peaked at No. 53 on the UK Singles Chart.

Watford's career faltered after 1995, when he was dropped by his label, East West Records, amid administrative turnover. He withdrew from his performing career in the years afterward, running karaoke bars in Newark before a stint working at a welfare office, though he harbored interest in returning to music.

Watford died from dementia at a hospital in Newark on January 26, 2024, at the age of 64.

== Discography ==
=== Albums ===
- Michael Watford (1994, East West America/Atlantic)

=== Singles ===
- "Holdin' On" (1991, Atlantic)
- "Luv 4-2" (1993, EastWest Records America)
- "Happy Man" (1994, EastWest)
- "Love to the World" (1994, EastWest)
- "So into You" (1994, EastWest) - UK No. 53
- Love to the World"/"Michael's Prayer" (1994, EastWest)
- "I Am What I Am (Fire Island Mix)'' (1995, EastWest)
- "Come Together" - Michael Watford & Robert Owens (1995, Hard Times) - UK No. 94
- "Love Change Over" (1995, Hard Times) - UK No. 86
- "Say Something" (1996, Free Bass)
- "Sunshine" - GTS feat. Michael Watford (1996, Artimage Vinyls)
- "Return Your Love to Me" (1996, Music Station)
- "Mighty Love" (1996, Music Station)
- "You Got It" - Deep Bros. feat. Michael Watford (1997, Azuli Records)
- "For Your Love" (1997, Free Bass)
- "I'm Coming Home" - Vice Versa feat. Michael Watford (1997, Azuli)
- "Heaven Is Calling You" (1997, Ulterior Records)
- "As" (1998, Soundmen On Wax)
- "For You" - Jamie Lewis feat. Michael Watford (1999, Purple Music)
- "Reach On Up" (with Tuff Jam) (1999, Locked On)
- "Understand Me" - I-D feat. Michael Watford(1999, Hole)
- "Watcha Gonna Do" - Jon Cutler & Michael Watford (2005, MN2S)
- "It's Over" - Jamie Lewis & Michael Watford (2006, Purple Music)
- "One More Time" - John Made vs Michael Watford (2006, Dream Beat)

== See also ==
- List of number-one dance hits (United States)
- List of artists who reached number one on the US Dance chart
