= Terra Nova (satellite) =

Canadian satellite

- Operator: (Canada) NordSpace

Spacecraft properties
- Spacecraft type: 3U CubeSat
- Bus: Athena
- Manufacturer: NordSpace

Start of mission
- Launch date: 1 October 2026, 18:32 UTC
- Rocket: Falcon 9

Terra Nova is a technology demonstration and Earth observation satellite developed by the Canadian company NordSpace. It is the first flight of the company's Athena satellite bus and is intended to test the Chronos imaging system for dual use Earth observation and the Zephyr in-space propulsion system. The 3U CubeSat-type small satellite was launched in October 2026 on Falcon 9's mission Transporter-18.

Transporter-18 encapsulation
