= Double Trouble (music producers) =

English musical group

- Origin: England
- Genres: Hip house, house
- Years active: 1985–1992, 2025
- Label: Desire Records
- Members: Leigh Guest
- Past members: Karl Brown; Michael Menson (deceased)

Double Trouble are an English dance record production and remixing group in the house and hip house scene, active during the late 1980s and early 1990s. In 2025, they returned after 35 years with a new single, "This Is Ska" in collaboration with Rebel MC.

== History ==
The group consisted of members Karl 'Tuff Enuff' Brown, Leigh Guest and Michael Menson and first rose to prominence through their collaborations with the Rebel MC on the Polydor/Desire releases "Just Keep Rockin'" and "Street Tuff", which reached numbers 5 and 1 respectively on the UK Indie Chart in 1989. "Just Keep Rockin'" then reached number 11 on the UK Singles Chart, while "Street Tuff" reached number 3, becoming their biggest hit. These two singles were included on Rebel MC's debut album, Rebel Music, as well as going on to feature on Double Trouble's own debut album, As One, which also spawned the singles "Don't Give Up", "Talk Back" and "Love Don't Live Here Anymore" - a cover of the Rose Royce track.

In 1991, a club/reggae single was released, entitled "Rub-A-Dub".

New interest in "Just Keep Rockin'" in December 2007 saw it re-enter the UK Dance Chart at number 32.

== Murder of Michael Menson ==
Michael Menson, son of a Ghanaian diplomat, died from the results of burns on 13 February 1997, his anorak having been set on fire by three men in Edmonton.

== Discography ==
=== Albums ===
- 1990: As One

=== Singles ===
Year	Single	Peak positions										Album
Year	Single	UK	AUS	IRE	NED	BEL (FLA)	GER	AUT	SWI	SWE	NZ	Album
1988	"Feel the Music (Feel the Bass)"	—	—	—	—	—	—	—	—	—	—	Single only
1989	"Just Keep Rockin'" (with Rebel MC)	11	—	—	3	14	—	—	—	—	—	As One
1989	"Street Tuff" (with Rebel MC)	3	85	—	3	7	12	13	10	12	29	As One
1990	"Talk Back"	71	—	—	49	—	—	—	—	—	—	As One
1990	"Love Don't Live Here Anymore"	21	147	29	—	—	35	—	—	—	11	As One
1990	"Celebrate" (as Double Trouble's Collective Effort)	77	—	—	—	—	—	—	—	—	—	Singles only
1991	"Rub-A-Dub"	66	—	—	—	—	—	—	—	—	—	Singles only
1991	"Give Me Some More"	—	—	—	—	—	—	—	—	—	—	Singles only
2025	"This Is Ska" (with Rebel MC featuring Kaya Fyah and Blackout JA)	—	—	—	—	—	—	—	—	—	—	Singles only

=== Remixes ===
The trio were responsible for a string of successful remixes including:

- Snap! - "Ooops Up"
- Joey B Ellis - "Go for It (Heart and Fire)"
- Joe Smooth - "Promised Land"
- Dream Warriors - "Ludi"
