= Tenor Fly =

- Born: Jonathan Sutter; 7 July 1967; Brixton, London, England
- Died: 17 June 2016 (aged 48)
- Occupations: Singer; rapper; songwriter; record producer
- Instrument: Vocals
- Years active: 1988–2016

Jonathan Sutter (7 July 1967 – 17 June 2016), better known by his stage name Tenor Fly, was a British singer and rapper. He rose to prominence in the ragga movement of the early 1990s.

Sutter was a solo artist and later a member of Freestylers. Fly was active in the music business from 1988, and was best known for his work with other artists, such as Rebel MC, Top Cat, Barrington Levy and Sir Coxson Sound.

Sutter died on 17 June 2016 with no details regarding his death made public.

== Discography ==
Note: selective listing

=== Albums ===
As lead/main artist

- Tenor Fly Meets Congo Natty (with Rebel MC a.k.a. Congo Natty) (2003)
- Tenor Fly Meets Top Cat – Two Veterans (with Top Cat) (2006)

As collaborating/featuring artist

- We Rock Hard by Freestylers (1998)
- Pressure Point by Freestylers (2001)

=== Singles ===
- "Roughneck Fashion", Blacka Dread (1989)
- "No More Agony", Ghetto Clappers (1989)
- "Town Ah Run Hot", Tribal Bass (1991)
- "Pose Up", Fashion (1992)
- "Sight Mi Nozzle", Gussie P (1993)
- "Bright Side of Life" Mango (1994)
- "Bump and Grine", 9LD (1994)
- "Mi Darlin'", Gussie P (1994)
- "Mind Weh Yu Seh", Fashion (1994)
- "I Get My Kicks" 9LD (1995)
- "Don't Dis The Jungle", Fashion, (1995)
- "Sorry If I Hurt Your Feelings", 9LD (1996)
- "Jah Give Me Energy", Kaya's Music (1998)

As collaborating/featuring artist

- "Dance Hall Clash" with Daddy Freddy (1989)
- "Culture"/"Coming on Strong" by Rebel MC (1990)
- "Tribal Base" by Rebel MC (1991)
- "The Wickedest Sound" by Rebel MC, Desire (1991)
- "Tease Dem" with Top Cat, Fashion, 1994
- "Let's Play" by Nerious Joseph, Big Orange (1995)
- "Sunshine" by Nerious Joseph, Song Star (1995)
- "Inna City" by Prizna (1995)
- "Alaska Ride" by Blackstar (1996)
- "B-Boy Stance" by Freestylers (1998)
- "Tarantula" by Pendulum (2005)
- "Born Again" by Rebel MC, Congo Natty (2010)
- "Positive People" by BRAINS (2011)
