= Raw as F**k =

Raw as Fuck

Studio album by Freestylers
- Released: July 2004
- Genres: Electronic; breakbeat; trip hop; house
- Length: 69:07
- Labels: Against the Grain; PIAS
- Producer: Freestylers

Freestylers chronology
Pressure Point (2001)	Raw as Fuck (2004)	FabricLive.19 (2004)

Singles from Raw as F**k
- 1. "Get a Life" Released: 2004; 2. "Push Up" Released: 2004; 3. "Boom Blast" Released: 2005

Raw as Fuck is an album by the British electronic music group Freestylers. Released in July 2004, it was the group's third album. It is also the first full-length album release from the Against the Grain label. The remix album was released almost a year later.

The album included breakbeat dance music, with tracks including the singles "Get a Life", "Push Up" and "Boom Blast". "Push Up" was particularly successful in Australia as a single, where it reached No. 2 in the charts, although in both Australia and the United Kingdom the album failed to make a major impact on the album charts.

The tracks "Punks", "The Slammer" and "No Replica" were originally from the singles the Freestylers created as Raw As Fuck in 2002–2003. The three singles were their first ever productions in Against the Grain.

Despite the album's title, the album did not carry a "Parental Advisory – Explicit Content" warning due to a lack of substantial profanity on the tracks themselves.

== Track listing ==
No.	Title	Writer(s)	Vocals	Length
1.	"Music Is Music"	Matt Cantor, Aston Harvey		1:10
2.	"Boom Blast"	Matt Cantor, Aston Harvey & Michael Dunn	Million Dan	6:07
3.	"Raw as Fuck" (co-written by Sy & Unknown)	Matt Cantor, Aston Harvey, Simon Cranny, Chris Sargent		5:50
4.	"Get a Life"	Matt Cantor, Aston Harvey & Tracey Bowen	Onallee	5:12
5.	"The Slammer"	Cantor, Harvey		6:59
6.	"Push Up"	Matt Cantor, Aston Harvey, Theodorakis Brehony & Reza Safinia	Theo	4:39
7.	"Punks"	Matt Cantor & Aston Harvey		6:07
8.	"Dogs and Sledges" (co-produced by Million Dan)	Matt Cantor, Aston Harvey & Michael Dunn	Million Dan	4:17
9.	"Warrior Charge" (co-written by Sy & Unknown)	Matt Cantor, Aston Harvey, Cranny & Chris Sargent		5:33
10.	"Losing You"	Matt Cantor, Aston Harvey & Julie Thompson	Julie Thompson	6:02
11.	"No Replica"	Matt Cantor, Aston Harvey & Michael Dunn	Million Dan	4:07
12.	"Right On"	Matt Cantor & Aston Harvey		5:47
13.	"Too Far"	Matt Cantor, Aston Harvey & Julie Thompson	Julie Thompson	7:17
Total length:				69:07

- Track 5 was originally from "The Slammer" / "Theme from Raw" single by Raw as F**k
- Track 7 was originally from the "Punks" / "Demon Beats" single by Raw as F**k
- Track 11 was originally credited as Million Dan vs. Raw as F**k
- The duration of tracks 6 & 11 are extended in US releases.

Raw as Fuck (Remixed)
No.	Title	Vocals	Length
1.	"Too Far" (NAPT Remix)	Julie Thompson	6:07
2.	"Push Up" (Plump DJ's Remix)	Theo	5:31
3.	"Boom Blast" (Deekline & Wizard Remix) (featuring Yolanda)	Million Dan	7:31
4.	"Right On" (Splitloop Remix)		4:41
5.	"Get a Life" (Poxy Music Remix)	Onallee	5:04
6.	"Warrior Charge" (Breakfastaz Remix)		4:42
7.	"Punks" (Krafty Kuts Remix)		5:40
8.	"No Replica" (Aquasky vs. Masterblaster Remix)	Million Dan	5:26
9.	"Get a Life" (Roni Size Remix)	Onallee	5:56
10.	"The Slammer" (Clipz Remix)		5:07
11.	"Boom Blast" (John B Remix)	Million Dan	5:00
Total length:			60:45

== Charts ==
Chart (2004)	Peak position
Australian Albums (ARIA)	66
Belgian Albums (Ultratop Flanders)	66
Dutch Albums (Album Top 100)	44
French Albums (SNEP)	180
UK Albums (OCC)	130
