= Maritime Launch Services =

Canadian space transportation company

Coordinates: 45.303559°N 60.982891°W

- Type: Public
- Traded as: Cboe: MAXQ; OTCQB: MAXQF
- ISIN: CA57033N1006
- Industry: Aerospace
- Founded: 2016; 10 years ago
- Founder: Steve Matier
- Headquarters: Halifax, Nova Scotia, Canada
- Key people: Steve Matier (CEO); Robert Feierbach (President); Phil Jones (CFO)
- Products: Launch service
- Services: Orbital rocket launch
- Website: www.maritimelaunch.com

Maritime Launch Services (MLS) is a Canadian space transport services company founded in 2016 and headquartered in Halifax, Nova Scotia, Canada. MLS is building a commercial launch facility near Canso, Nova Scotia called Spaceport Nova Scotia. Three sub-orbital flights have been launched from this site.

Originally, MLS was to rely on Ukrainian-built Cyclone-4M rockets by Pivdenne Design Office to launch polar and Sun-synchronous orbit from Canso, Nova Scotia. Due to supply problems caused by the 2022 Russian invasion of Ukraine, the agreement was terminated.

In 2024, Maritime Launch Services transitioned to an airport model, planning to lease facilities and services to launch vehicle providers. The company has signed agreements with Netherlands-based T-Minus Engineering, Quebec-based Reaction Dynamics, and Germany-based Isar Aerospace to provide launch services. The company has signed Letters of Intent with UK-based Skyrora and South Korea-based Innospace.

== Launch site ==
On 14 March 2017, MLS selected Canso, Nova Scotia as its launch site. MLS applied to lease 15 hectares (37 acres) of land outside the town from the provincial Department of Natural Resources. This leased area was later increased to 335 acres. The launch site is approximately 3.5 km south of Canso, with the Vehicle Processing Facility located approximately 2 km south-west of Canso. After delays, MLS received final approval for construction in August 2022 and began work in September 2022.

The site is slated to include a 10 to 15 metre-tall control centre and rocket assembly facility, with a launch pad positioned 2.4 kilometres away, linked by a custom rail system for rocket transportation. It will be the only operational spaceport in Canada, after the abandonment of the Churchill Rocket Research Range in the 1990s, and the first commercial spaceport for orbital launches in the country. It was estimated that construction of the spaceport would take three or four years to complete, but the first pad was not ready until 2024.

=== Launch History ===
Flight no.	Date and time (EST)	Launch Vehicle	Launch Vehicle Provider	Payload	Altitude Achieved	Outcome
1	6 July 2023	Goose 3	Arbalest Rocketry (York University)	VisionCosmos Saudi Arabia's VCL-1 ChipSat.	13.4km	Success
1	The Goose 3 amateur rocket developed by Arbalest Rocketry, a student group from York University. The Goose 3 rocket's first launch attempt occurred on 5 July 2023, but was delayed by one day, due to weather.					
2	20 November 2025; 10:54 EST	Barracuda	T-Minus Engineering	Various scientific and educational payloads for clients, and STORIES of Space student original stories and student-designed mission patches.	<100km	Success
2	Two Barracudas were originally scheduled to be launched in October 2025, this was reduced to one Barracuda due to T-Minus Engineering not having completed the second rocket, and the launch was delayed to a 18-24 November 2025 launch window due to a European port strike.					
3	10 June 2026 8:51 ADT	Barracuda	T-Minus Engineering	No payload.	<100km	Success
3	Two Barracuda were scheduled to be launched in a 8-14 June 2026 window. As the first launch did not reach the Kármán line due to an anomaly, the second launch was scrubbed for a later date to allow time for analysis.					
4	October 2026	Barracuda	T-Minus Engineering			Planned
4	A fourth Barracuda rocket launch is being planned for October 2026.					
5	Q3 2028	Aurora-8	Reaction Dynamics (RDX)			Planned
5	In August 2025, Maritime Launch Services reached an agreement with RDX for a one-time exclusive agreement to perform an orbital launch attempt on or about Q3 2028.					
6	2028	Spectrum	Isar Aerospace			Planned
6	In July 2026, Maritime Launch Services reached an agreement with Isar Aerospace for a dedicated launch complex to perform orbital launches beginning in 2028.					

==== Flights by mission outcome ====
Success Failure Partial Failure Planned

==== First launch ====
The first rocket launch that occurred from Spaceport Nova Scotia was the Goose 3 amateur rocket developed by Arbalest Rocketry, a student group from York University. The Goose 3 rocket's first launch attempt occurred on 5 July 2023, but was delayed by one day, due to weather. Goose 3 was successful launched on 6 July 2023, reaching 13.4 kilometers.

==== Second launch ====
The second rocket launch that occurred from Spaceport Nova Scotia was the Barracuda hypersonic test platform by T-Minus Engineering. Two Barracudas were originally scheduled to be launched in October 2025, this was reduced to one Barracuda due to T-Minus Engineering not having completed the second rocket, and the launch was delayed to a 18-24 November 2025 launch window due to a European port strike. The Barracuda was successful launched on 20 November 2025 at 10:54 a.m. Eastern time, but did not cross the Kármán line.

==== Third launch ====
The third rocket launch that occurred from Spaceport Nova Scotia was the Barracuda hypersonic test platform by T-Minus Engineering. Two Barracudas were scheduled to be launched in a 8-14 June 2026 window. One Barracuda was successful launched on 10 June 2025 at 8:51 a.m. Atlantic time, but did not cross the Kármán line. The second launch was scrubbed for a later date.

=== Launch Vehicle Partnerships ===
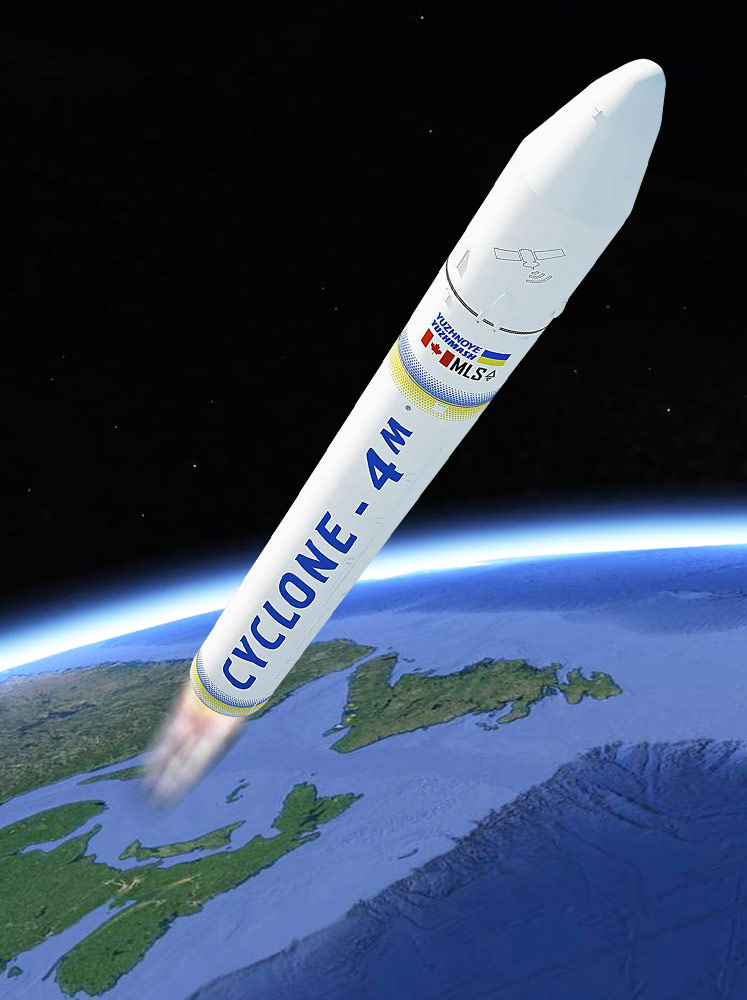
Cyclone-4M graphic

==== Cyclone-4M ====
MLS originally planned to utilize the Ukrainian-built Cyclone-4M medium-lift launch vehicle designed by Pivdenne Design Office. It was expected to use a first-stage derived from the Soviet-era Zenit launch vehicle. It was to be powered by four Ukrainian-built RD-870 kerosene/LOX engines. These engines were originally designed for the vacuum of space on a second-stage for Soviet-era rockets. The upper stage stack was developed from the original hypergolic Cyclone 4 rocket. The first launch of the Cyclone-4M was originally expected to take place at Canso in 2025. However, because of the 2022 Russian invasion of Ukraine, and the uncertainty the prolonged war caused, MLS terminated the agreement to launch Cyclone from Spaceport Nova Scotia in third quarter 2024.

Before the 2022 Russian invasion of Ukraine, MLS originally had planned to launch eight Cyclone-4M rockets annually. The launch site has two southward launch orbital inclination options:

Option 1 is a Sun-synchronous orbit launch between 600–800 km in altitude, for smaller satellites, with a payload up to 3350 kg for $45 million USD.
Option 2 is an equatorial low Earth orbit launch, below 600 km in altitude, that will allow a payload up to 5000 kg also for $45 million USD.

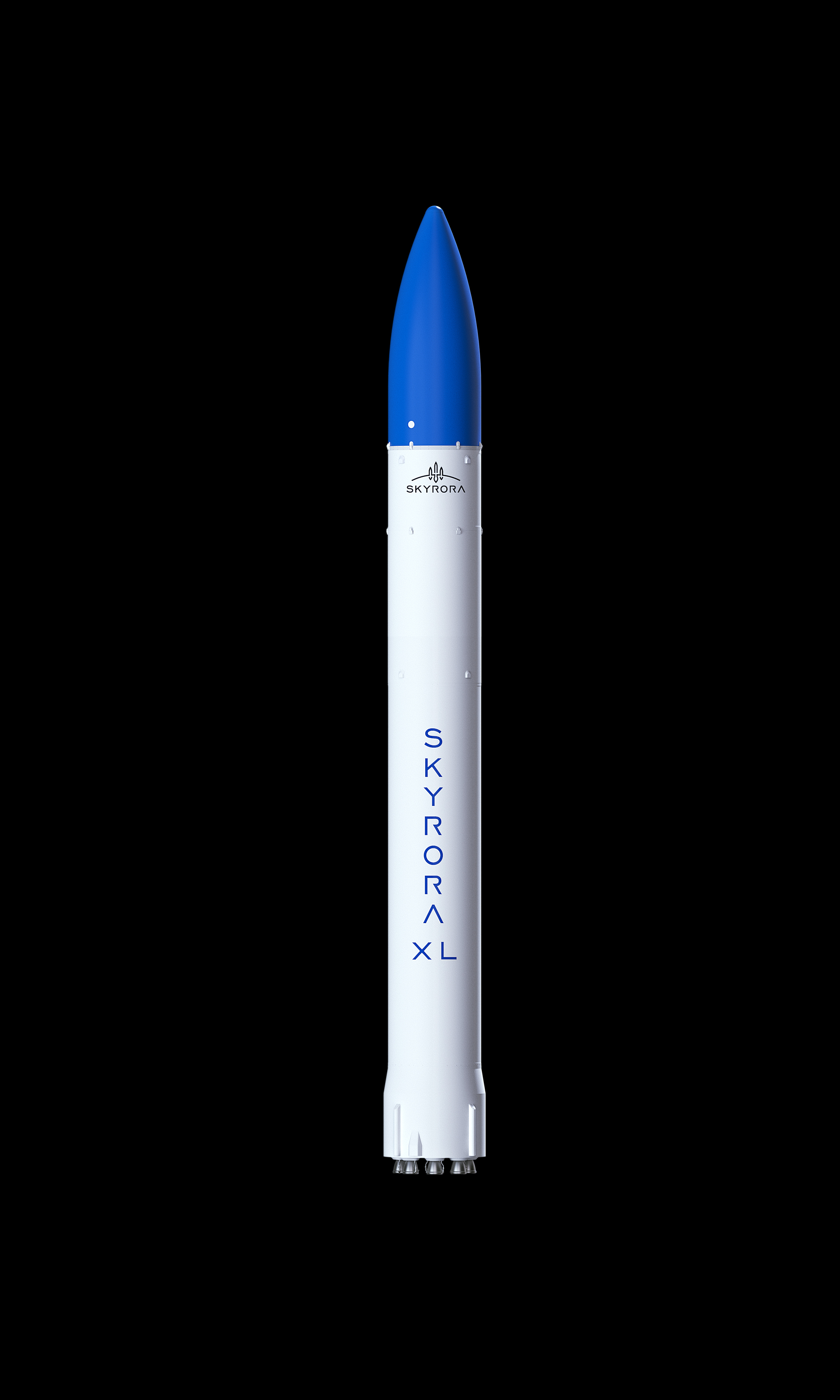
Skyrora XL graphic

==== Skyrora XL ====
In September 2022, Maritime Launch Services signed a Letter of Intent with the UK-based company Skyrora to launch that company's Skyrora XL small class launch vehicle from Spaceport Nova Scotia.

==== Barracuda ====
In June 2025, Maritime Launch Services reached an agreement with the Dutch company T-Minus Engineering to perform two launches of that company's Barracuda hypersonic test platform from Spaceport Nova Scotia in October 2025. The Barracuda was first successful launched from Spaceport Nova Scotia on 20 November 2025.. On 5 January 2026, Steve Matier stated that Maritime Launch Services was planning to launch two more Barracuda rockets from Spaceport Nova Scotia in May or June 2026, with a fourth launch being planned for late 2026. In May 2026, Matier stated that these launches would occur in June and October. One Barracuda was successfully launched on 10 June 2026, with the second launched scrubbed to a later date.

==== Aurora-8 ====
In August 2025, Maritime Launch Services reached an agreement with the Quebec-based firm Reaction Dynamics (RDX) to launch that company's Aurora-8 small-class orbital launch vehicle from Spaceport Nova Scotia no earlier than 2028.

==== HANBIT ====
In March 2026, Maritime Launch Services signed a Letter of Intent with the South Korea-based Innospace to evaluate hosting that company's HANBIT launch system from Spaceport Nova Scotia, with a deadline of December 2026 to finalize an agreement.

==== Spectrum ====
In May 2026, Maritime Launch Services signed a Letter of Intent with the German-based Isar Aerospace to bring together Isar Aerospace's Spectrum orbital launch system and Spaceport Nova Scotia. In July 2026, Maritime Launch Services reached an agreement with Isar Aerospace for a dedicated launch complex to perform orbital launches beginning in 2028.

== Ground Control Site ==
In June 2021, Maritime Launch Services acquired a 6.87 acre piece of private land at 233 Dover Road. On 8 January 2025, Maritime Launch Services requested to rezone the property from mixed-use rural residential (MRR-1) to commercial.

=== Launch Control Centre ===
On 19 November 2021, Maritime Launch Services announced plans to construct a Launch Control Centre on the land the company had acquired. This LCC is planned to contain launch control functionality, a press briefing room, and a visitors centre to include interactive exhibits, a theatre, a gift store, and a public launch viewing area.

=== Ground Station ===
On 25 September 2024, Maritime Launch Services announced an agreement with Italy-based ground segment as-a-service (GSaaS) provider Leaf Space. This 10-year agreement was to build and host a new ground station at Spaceport Nova Scotia. The station was expected to be operation in Q1 2025, the completed installation was announced in August 2026.

== See also ==
- Spaceport
- NordSpace
- List of rocket launch sites
