= Atlantic Spaceport Complex =

Canadian space launch facility

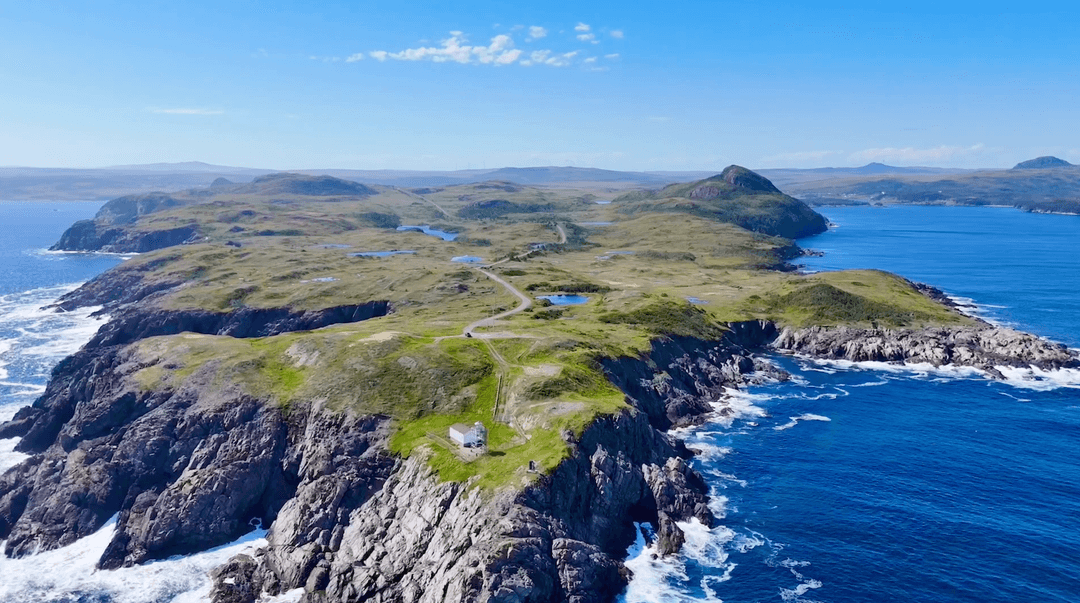
- Site of the Atlantic Spaceport Complex (2025)
- IATA: none; ICAO: none

Summary
- Airport type: Private commercial spaceport
- Owner: NordSpace
- Location: Newfoundland and Labrador, Canada
- Website: www.nordspace.com/spaceport

The Atlantic Spaceport Complex (ASX) is an under-construction commercial space launch facility in Newfoundland and Labrador, Canada. The initiative is being led by NordSpace.

== Launch facility ==
The launch site is located near the town of St. Lawrence in Newfoundland and Labrador – about 350 kilometres (220 mi) southwest of St. John's. Construction of the facility was announced in August 2025. The initiative, led by NordSpace, will support both orbital flights and suborbital flights and tracking infrastructure. Its inaugural test flight, which will be Canada's first commercial rocket launch, is to take place sometime in September. NordSpace plans to launch its smaller Taiga rocket for the facility's maiden flight from SLC-02, and has future plans to launch its 26-metre orbital rocket Tundra at the same facility from SLC-01.

The facility is planned to have 2 launch locations, SLC-01 and SLC-02. The smaller site, SLC-02, is expected to feature ground station equipment, such as satellite communication and rocket communication systems, radar, and a small launch area used for launching weather balloons and sounding rockets for upper atmospheric research. The larger site, SLC-01, is planned to be the location of 2 launchpads used for launching orbital rockets.

== Taiga rocket ==
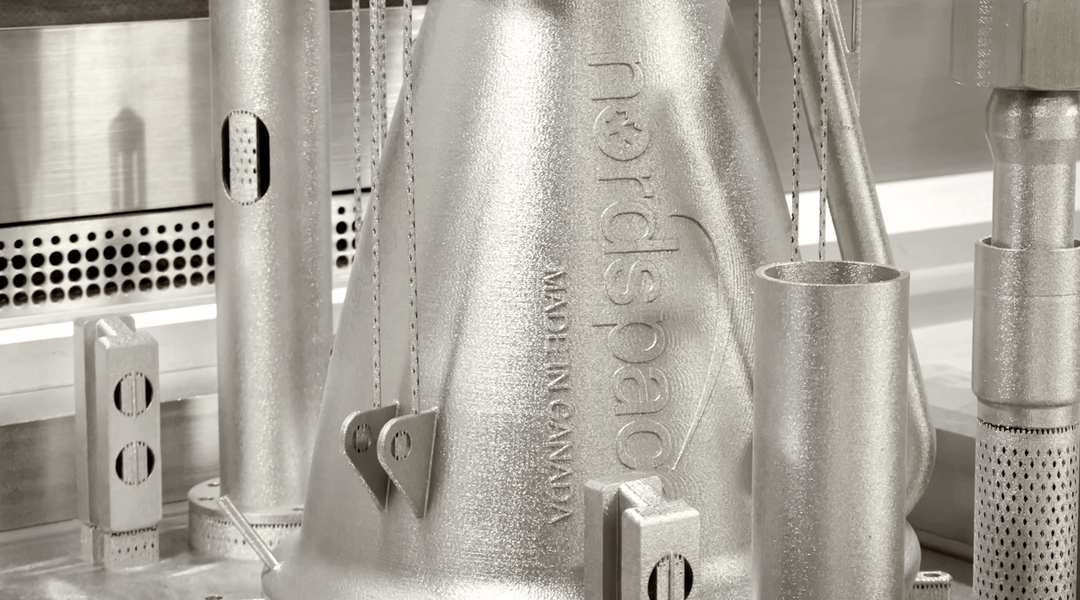

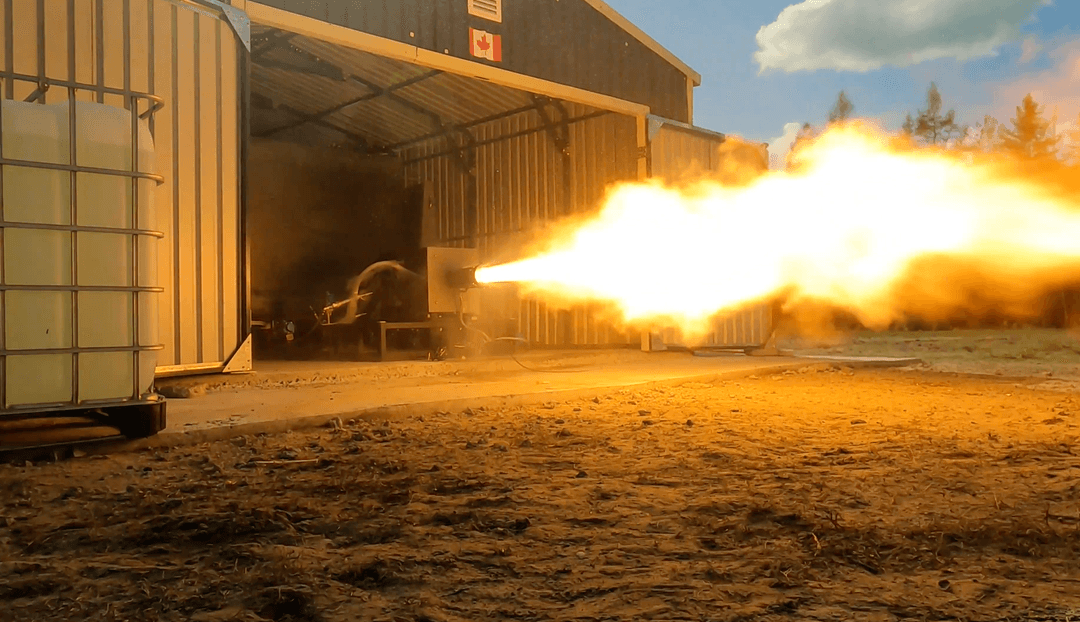
The Taiga rocket is powered by the Hadfield Mk III engine, developed in Ontario

Taiga is a 6-metre tall suborbital rocket created by NordSpace planned to launch from the Atlantic Spaceport Complex. While the Taiga rocket will not head into orbit per se, it is ultimately designed to pass the Kármán line which is considered the defining line between Earth and space, but will fly partially fuelled to an approximate 10 kilometre altitude for its first flight. The suborbital test flight is expected to last approximately 60 seconds, according to the company's CEO Rahul Goel. The rocket is powered by its 3D-printed Hadfield Mk III engine, uses kerosene and liquid oxygen, and took about a year of development to design and manufacture in Canada.

The spaceport's first mission, named "Getting Screeched In" will feature the company's Taiga rocket. "Getting Screeched In" is a tradition in Newfoundland of initiating visitors to the island's culture by inviting them to have a shot of rum, kiss a cod, and recite local slang.

=== Launch attempts ===
Taiga's first launch was scheduled to happen between Monday 25 August 2025 and Friday August 29 2025. However, Friday was the only available launch day due to unfavourable weather caused by Hurricane Erin.

==== First launch attempt ====
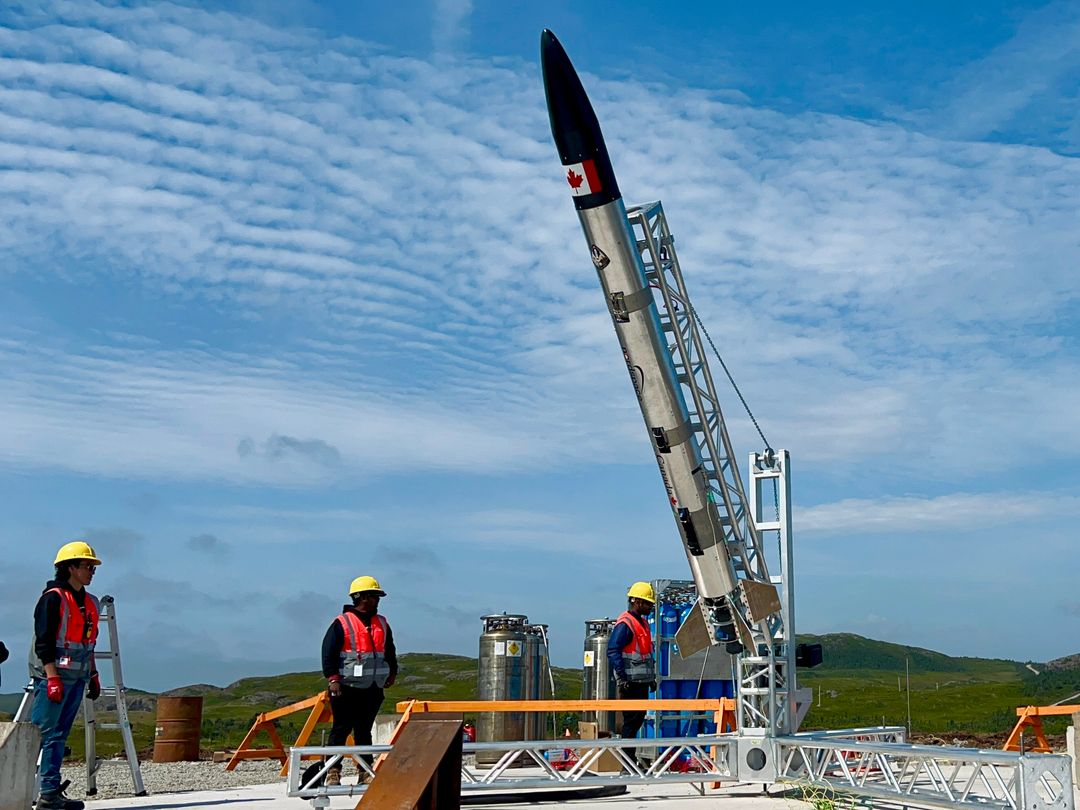
The first 2 launch attempts of the Taiga Rocket occurred on 29 August 2025

The Taiga rocket's first launch attempt occurred on Friday 29 August 2025, but was scrubbed at 11:45 a.m. NDT, due to an issue caused by a quick disconnect mechanism from the nitrogen tank losing power due to an issue with the generator powering the air compressor for the pneumatic mechanism. The issue was resolved minutes later.

==== Second launch attempt ====
Later that same day, a second launch window opened from 3:00 p.m. to 7:00 p.m. however the earliest the rocket could launch was at 4:50 p.m. 58 seconds to launch at 6:37 p.m. the launch countdown timer was held. About 1 minute later at 6:38 p.m. the rocket's Hadfield engine successfully ignited for launch, however the rocket's misfire detection mechanism kicked in and chose to shut off fuel flow to ensure safety of the vehicle. It was later determined that there was no actual misfire, the rocket's software was over cautious, and stopped an otherwise nominal launch. NordSpace's launch license ended that day. Although Taiga remained safe and ready to launch, NordSpace was required to wait to acquire a renewed licence from Transport Canada and re-attempt their launch in September.

==== Third launch attempt ====
A future launch attempt was planned for September once NordSpace's launch license would be re-issued. However, the re-issue and subsequent launch attempt was expected to occur sometime between mid-November until early to mid-December 2025. As of October 2026, no statements from Nordspace have been released on any potential future launch attempts of the Taiga rocket.

==== Future planned launches ====
Most of NordSpace's team transitioned to working on their orbital rocket program, satellite program, spaceport development, and the expansion of manufacturing and testing facilities after the failed launch attempts of Taiga. Orbital-scale tests are to commence in early 2026. Future orbital launches will benefit from on-site cryogenic propellant generation, as well as other infrastructure at the complex.
