= Street Tuff =

1989 single by Rebel MC & Double Trouble

Single by Rebel MC & Double Trouble

from the album Rebel Music
- Released: 1989
- Genre: Dance; hip house
- Length: 3:31
- Label: Desire
- Songwriters: Leigh Guest; Michael Menson; Michael West
- Producers: Double Trouble; Rebel MC

Rebel MC singles chronology
"Just Keep Rockin'" (1989)	"Street Tuff" (1989)	"Better World" (1990)

Music video
- "Street Tuff" on YouTube

"Street Tuff" is a song by British producer and toaster Rebel MC and Double Trouble featuring vocals by Janet Rose. It is written by Leigh Guest, Michael Menson and Michael West. Released in 1989 by the Desire label as their second single from the debut album, Rebel Music (1990), it became a commercial success and the biggest hit of both performers' careers, peaking at number three on the UK Singles Chart. It is the follow-up to their first hit, "Just Keep Rockin'", which made it into the UK top 20. Additionally, "Street Tuff" became a top-10 hit in Belgium, Greece, Israel, Luxembourg, the Netherlands and Switzerland.

== Critical reception ==
David Taylor-Wilson from Bay Area Reporter named the song "one of the most infectious grooves we've heard all year", noting that it "mixes the rhythms of Jamaican reggae with a house music beat. Just try and sit still when this one’s playing." Bill Coleman from Billboard magazine wrote that "clever rhyming powered by insinuating club beats" could generate multiformat play to follow the UK act's previous smash, "Just Keep Rockin'". David Giles from Music Week complimented it as a "splendid duet between hot young rapper Rebel MC and former Simply Red backing vocalist Janet Rose, conducted to an instrumental track that sounds very much like a dancehall reggae groove speeded up to 45 rpm! Brilliant and irresistibly danceable." A reviewer from The Network Forty felt that featuring the "sultry Annie Lennox style vocals" of the singer, "this rap-dance record covers both musical realms with equal zeal."

Siân Pattenden from Smash Hits said, "Quite a funky little number this, though very much in the same vein as their last single. There are lots of "yeahs", a boogalong beat and a host of currazy rhythms to keep you dancing. The words are very hard and tough, because the Rebel Mc is "street tuff" and he stings "like a bee" and that sorts of thing." Frank Owen from Spin found that the song is "a single masquerading as an album", "both marketing gimmick and a testament to the way the British mix and match different musical genres, unlike in the US, where the demarcation lines between house, hip hop and reggae still remain fiercely patrolled aesthetic boundaries."

== Charts ==
=== Weekly charts ===
Chart (1989–1990)	Peak position
Australia (ARIA)	85
Austria (Ö3 Austria Top 40)	13
Belgium (Ultratop 50 Flanders)	7
Europe (Eurochart Hot 100)	14
Greece (IFPI)	3
Israel (Israeli Singles Chart)	2
Italy (Musica e dischi)	19
Luxembourg (Radio Luxembourg)	3
Netherlands (Dutch Top 40)	4
Netherlands (Single Top 100)	3
New Zealand (Recorded Music NZ)	29
Sweden (Sverigetopplistan)	12
Switzerland (Schweizer Hitparade)	10
UK Singles (Official Charts)	3
West Germany (GfK)	12

=== Year-end charts ===
Chart (1989)	Position
Belgium (Ultratop)	60
Netherlands (Dutch Top 40)	34
Netherlands (Single Top 100)	27
UK Singles (OCC)	25

Chart (1990)	Position
Germany (Media Control)	68
