= Pressure Point (album) =

Studio album by Freestylers
- Released: 2001
- Recorded: 72:02 (2001 UK release); 76:49 (2002 US release)
- Genre: Big beat, breakbeat, trip hop
- Label: Freskanova (UK); Mammoth (US)
- Producer: Freestylers

Freestylers chronology
We Rock Hard (1998)	Pressure Point (2001)	Raw as F**k (2004)

Pressure Point is the second album by the English electronic group Freestylers, released in 2001. The album contains singles such as "Get Down Massive", "Told You So" and "Weekend Song".

== Track listing ==
No.	Title	Writer(s)	Length
1.	"Intro"	Matt Cantor, Aston Harvey	1:02
2.	"Now Is the Time"	Cantor, Harvey	4:38
3.	"London Sound" (featuring Tenor Fly)	Cantor, Harvey, Jonathan Sutter	5:39
4.	"Told You So" (featuring Petra)	Cantor, Harvey, Petra Jean Phillipson	4:41
5.	"Bad Boy Love" (featuring Navigator)	Cantor, Harvey, Raymond Crawford	6:09
6.	"Bass Odyssey"	Cantor, Harvey	5:25
7.	"Calling" (featuring Valerie M)	Cantor, Harvey, Valerie Malcolm	5:30
8.	"Phenomenon One" (featuring Tenor Fly)	Cantor, Harvey, Sutter	5:48
9.	"Broadcast Channels" (featuring Cardinal)	Cantor, Harvey, Justin Warfield	6:26
10.	"Blowin Ya Brainz"	Cantor, Harvey	5:15
11.	"Weekend Song" (featuring Tenor Fly)	Cantor, Harvey, Sutter	4:23
12.	"Get Down Massive" (featuring Navigator)	Cantor, Harvey, Crawford	5:25
13.	"Rumours of War" (featuring Navigator)	Cantor, Harvey, Crawford	5:59
14.	"Signs" (featuring Spanner Banner & Tenor Fly)	Cantor, Harvey, Joseph Bonner, Sutter	5:42
Total length:			1:12:02

2002 US release
No.	Title	Writer(s)	Vocals	Length
1.	"Intro"	Matt Cantor, Aston Harvey		1:02
2.	"Get Down Massive"	Cantor, Harvey, Crawford	Navigator	5:25
3.	"Weekend Song"	Cantor, Harvey, Sutter	Tenor Fly	3:57
4.	"Now Is the Time"	Cantor, Harvey		4:38
5.	"Bad Boy Love"	Cantor, Harvey, Raymond Crawford	Navigator	6:09
6.	"Bass Odyssey"	Cantor, Harvey		5:24
7.	"Calling"	Cantor, Harvey, Valerie Malcolm	Valerie M	5:30
8.	"Phenomenon One"	Cantor, Harvey, Sutter	Tenor Fly	5:47
9.	"Broadcast Channels"	Cantor, Harvey, Justin Warfield	Cardinal	6:26
10.	"Blowin Ya Brainz"	Cantor, Harvey		6:41
11.	"London Sound"	Cantor, Harvey, Jonathan Sutter	Tenor Fly	5:39
12.	"Told You So"	Cantor, Harvey, Petra Jean Phillipson	Petra	4:40
13.	"Rumours of War"	Cantor, Harvey, Crawford	Navigator	6:00
14.	"Signs"	Cantor, Harvey, Joseph Bonner, Sutter	Spanner Banner, Tenor Fly	5:56
15.	"Weekend Song" (Radio Mix)	Cantor, Harvey, Sutter	Tenor Fly	3:35
Total length:				1:16:49

- In the 2002 US release, some tracks have altered durations (especially 3 & 10) and tracks 2–4 & 11–12 have changed their order of appearance.
