= Definition of Sound =

London-based dance-music group

Definition of Sound were a London-based dance-music group, consisting of Kevin Clark and Don Weekes, working with musicians Rex Brough (a.k.a. The Red King) and later Mike Spencer. Their second and fourth singles, "Wear Your Love Like Heaven" (1991) and "Moira Jane's Café" (1992) were top 40 hits on the UK Singles Chart. The group also had several songs enter the U.S. Billboard Hot Dance Club Play chart, including "Moira Jane's Café", which hit No. 1 in 1992.

== Career ==
Clark and Weekes first recorded together in 1988, using the name Top Billin. They released two songs, "Naturally" and "Straight From the Soul", on the Dance Yard record label before signing to Phonogram for the single " My Thing/Surprise". In 1990, the band signed to Circa in the UK and Cardiac in the US. Having changed their name to Definition of Sound, the duo recorded Love and Life: A Journey With the Chameleons (1991). The album featured four singles: "Now Is Tomorrow", "Wear Your Love Like Heaven", "Moira Jane's Cafe", and "Dream Girl". Vocal duties on "Now Is Tomorrow" and some album tracks were handled by singer, Elaine Vassel. The video for "Moira Jane's Cafe" was directed by Mark Romanek.

Although they had no Billboard Hot 100 entries, the song "Now Is Tomorrow" (a No. 10 dance hit) climbed to No. 68 on the Hot 100 Airplay chart in 1991, whilst "Moira Jane's Cafe" became the first UK Rap record to become number 1 on the Billboard Dance Charts, earning the band accolades from their American peers. The album was well received by critics in the UK and America.

The band recorded two more albums, The Lick (1992) and Experience (1996), Which Included Pass The Vibes, Which Reached No.49 on Triple J Hottest 100 of 1996, for different record labels and with different producers. In 1997 they released three promotional singles through MCA/Universal, in advance of a planned fourth album. Before the album was released, the band decided to stop recording.

Clark and Weekes' are featured as Definition of Sound on the Freestylers' single "Here We Go" (1998).

Initially, the final members Clark, Weekes, and Spencer continued as a songwriting remix and production team.

Clark went on to work in A&R and music publishing. He was also a recurring cast member on The Mayor of Kentish Town comedy radio show on Soho Radio, with Steve Furst (Little Britain/Lenny Beige) and Dominic Coleman (Miranda/Trollied).

Spencer has continued producing and recording musicians, as well as music publishing.

Weekes released a solo album before leaving the music industry.

== Discography ==
=== Albums ===
List of albums, with selected chart positions
Title	Album details	Peak chart positions	
Title	Album details	UK	AUS
Love and Life: A Journey With the Chameleons	Released: 1991; Format: LP, CS, CD; Label: Circa	38	97
The Lick	Released: November 1992; Format: LP, CS, CD, MD; Label: Circa	–	176
Experience	Released: August 1996; Format: CD, CS; Label: Fontana	97	142

=== Singles ===
Year	Single	Peak positions							Album
Year	Single	UK	AUS	NED	NZ	SWE	SWI	US Dance	Album
1990	"Now Is Tomorrow"	94	—	—	—	—	—	—	Love And Life: A Journey With The Chameleons
1991	"Wear Your Love Like Heaven"	17	77	38	–	34	28	28	Love And Life: A Journey With The Chameleons
1991	"Now Is Tomorrow" (reissue)	46	85	77	–	–	–	10	Love And Life: A Journey With The Chameleons
1991	"Dream Girl"	–	178	—	—	—	—	—	Love And Life: A Journey With The Chameleons
1992	"Moira Jane's Café"	34	153	50	–	–	–	1	Love And Life: A Journey With The Chameleons
1992	"What Are You Under"	68	116	–	41	–	–	4	The Lick
1992	"Can I Get Over"	61	106	—	—	—	—	—	The Lick
1995	"Boom Boom"	59	—	—	—	—	—	—	Experience
1995	"Pass the Vibes"	23	36	—	—	—	—	—	Experience
1996	"Child"	48	—	—	—	—	—	—	Experience
1997	"Eccentric"	–	—	—	—	—	—	—	singles only
1997	"Outsider" (promo)	–	–	–	–	–	–	—	singles only
1998	"Lipstick on My Collar" (promo)	–	—	—	—	—	—	—	singles only
"—" denotes releases that did not chart or were not released.

=== Music videos ===
- "Now Is Tomorrow" Directed by Mike Owen.
- "Wear Your Love Like Heaven"
- "Moira Jane's Café" Directed by Mark Romanek
- "What Are You Under"
- "Pass The Vibes"
- "Child" Directed by Dani Jacobs

== See also ==
- List of number-one dance hits (United States)
- List of artists who reached number one on the US Dance chart
- List of performers on Top of the Pops
- List of Peel sessions
