= Reaction Dynamics (company) =

Canadian aerospace launch vehicle company

- Type: Private company
- Industry: Aerospace
- Founded: 2017
- Founder: Bachar Elzein
- Headquarters: Longueuil, Quebec, Canada
- Key people: Bachar Elzein (CEO); Maxime Goulet-Bourdon (Director of Operations); Rémi Lecerf (Director of Strategy)
- Products: Orbital launch vehicles Hybrid rocket engines
- Number of employees: 37 (2022)
- Website: https://reactiondynamics.space

Reaction Dynamics is a Canadian aerospace company headquartered in Longueuil, Quebec, specializing in hybrid rocket propulsion and small satellite launch vehicles. Founded in 2017, the company is developing a light launch vehicle called Aurora, designed to deliver small payloads into low Earth orbit using hybrid rocket engines. The first suborbital flight of Aurora was planned for 2025, followed by an orbital flight targeted for 2028.

== History ==
Reaction Dynamics was founded in 2017 in Montreal by aerospace engineer Bachar Elzein with the objective of developing a low-cost hybrid-propulsion rocket system. The company has received multiple research and development contributions from the Canadian Space Agency under its Space Technology Development Program. The largest of these was a grant of CAD 1.5 million awarded in 2020.

In the same year, Reaction Dynamics completed a CAD 5 million funding round to acquire industrial equipment for its rocket manufacturing facilities.

In May 2022, CEO Bachar Elzein stated that the company had secured letters of intent from approximately a dozen prospective customers across Canada, the United States, and Europe, with a combined potential contract value approaching CAD 500 million.

Later in May 2022, Reaction Dynamics signed an agreement with Canadian launch provider Maritime Launch Services to conduct suborbital and orbital launches from the Canso Spaceport in Nova Scotia.

== Projects ==
=== Aurora ===
Aurora is a two-stage light launch vehicle under development, designed to place payloads of between 50 and 150 kg into a 500 km low Earth orbit. Both stages employ hybrid rocket engines combining liquid oxidizers with solid fuel.

The rocket is approximately 18 m tall with a diameter of 1.8 m. The first stage is powered by eight hybrid rocket engines, each producing 34 kN of thrust at liftoff, and uses carbon composite propellant tanks. The second stage is powered by a single hybrid engine equipped with a vacuum-optimized nozzle.

Aurora’s payload fairing measures 2.5 m in height and 1.3 m in diameter. A campaign of suborbital test flights was planned to validate flight hardware, launch procedures, and ground systems, and to support licensing for an orbital launch attempt.

=== RE 201 / RE 202 ===
Reaction Dynamics is developing hybrid rocket engines for the Aurora launcher using solid fuel formulations that incorporate recycled polymer materials. Engine components are designed using metal additive manufacturing technologies derived from industrial 3D printing.

Small-scale engine firing tests began in 2018 at a decommissioned mine in Saint-Joseph-de-Coleraine, near Thetford Mines. Larger-scale testing has been underway since 2020, focusing on two orbital-class engine variants designated RE 201 and RE 202.

The most recent RE 202 test firing occurred in March 2024, achieving a burn duration of approximately 12 seconds.

=== RE 101 / RE 102 ===
The RE 101 class of hybrid rocket engines was developed primarily as a test platform for Reaction Dynamics’ proprietary solid hybrid fuel. The RE 101 is smaller and simpler than the RE 201/202 and is used exclusively for static ground testing. The company reported an internal record of six firings conducted in a single day using the RE 101 platform.

A secondary objective of the RE 101 program is the validation of regeneratively cooled nozzles, a technology intended to reduce nozzle erosion and improve hybrid engine efficiency. In December 2023, Reaction Dynamics successfully completed a 30‑second firing of an RE 101 engine equipped with a regeneratively cooled nozzle.

The RE 102 engine, derived from the RE 101 architecture, is currently under development and is intended for use on the suborbital Aurora vehicle. The RE 102 is expected to be lighter and more compact than its predecessor.

== See also ==
- Maritime Launch Services
- Canadian Space Agency
