= RDX (band) =

Jamaican musical duo

RDX (Renegade & Delomar from Xsytment) were a duo of reggae recording artists, producers and performers composed of the deejay Renegade (Carlton Williams) and singer Delomar (Andre Bedward), hailing from Waterhouse and Kencot in Kingston, Jamaica respectively.

The duo are known for multiple successful dancehall hits in the late 2000s and 2010s (Dance, Everybody Dance, Dancers' Anthem, and Daggering / Bend Over), and have also toured internationally to the United States and Canada, across Europe, Japan, the Caribbean, and have performed on concerts in the United Kingdom and African countries such as Uganda, Kenya, Mauritius, and Seychelles.

Williams and Bedward began their dancehall music career in 2003 as members of a group called "Xsytment". In 2006, they broke away and formed the duo. In 2007, they released the hit single "Dance".

Their collaborations have included Lose Yourself with Major Lazer, Mash Up The Place with Sak Noel & Salvi and Ser Libre with Konshens. Broad Out was their 7th chart topper in Jamaica. Their other popular songs include Kotch, Ride It, Jump and Bang!.

They received Group of the year honors in 2007 and 2008, and charted internationally with Skip (Poland), Movements (Poland and Panama), Deliver Me (Guyana) and For The Girls (Trinidad).

RDX release their debut album To The World in 2008, and their second studio album Level Up in 2017. The lead single from Level Up was Shake Your Bam Bam, an interpretation of Sister Nancy's classic reggae hit song 'Bam Bam'.

The duo has since split in 2020 amidst a very public feud between both Renegade (now known as Renigad) and Delomar over various issues including their perception and image as dancehall artistes, song crediting, and inequalities in their friendship.
