= Rebel MC =

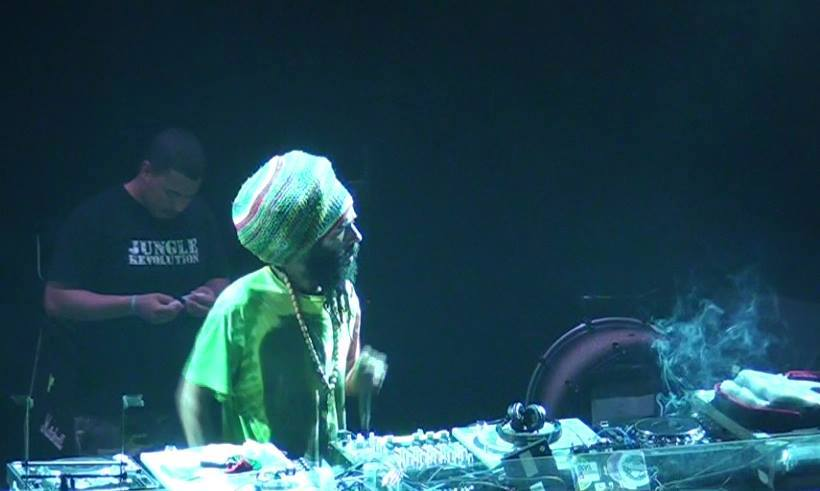

Background information
- Also known as: Congo Natty; X Project; Conquering Lion; Blackstar; Tribe of Issachar; Ras Project
- Born: Michael Alec Anthony West; 27 August 1964 (age 62); Islington, London, England
- Genres: Hip house; jungle
- Occupations: Record producer; toaster
- Years active: 1980s–present
- Labels: Desire; Big Life; Tribal Bass; Mango; X Project; Congo Natty; Big Dada

Michael Alec Anthony West (born 27 August 1964 in Islington, London, England), better known as Rebel MC and Congo Natty, is a British jungle producer, spiritual chanter, and toaster. He has also gone by aliases including Conquering Lion, Blackstar, Tribe of Issachar, Lion of Judah, X Project, and Ras Project.

== Biography ==
West was born to a Jamaican father and a Welsh mother.

In the late 1980s, West formed the group Double Trouble with Michael Menson, Karl Brown (more commonly known as the UK garage DJ Karl 'Tuff Enuff' Brown), and Leigh Guest. This would lead to two hip house records reaching the UK Top 40 in 1989 - "Just Keep Rockin'" followed by "Street Tuff". The latter reached number 3 in the UK Singles Chart. These would appear shortly after on his debut album Rebel Music.

In 1991, West released his second album, Black Meaning Good, which combined his former hip house and pop-rap influences with radical political, spiritual consciousness, and a stronger roots reggae, dubwise, and breakbeat edge. The album featured notable reggae and dancehall artists such as Barrington Levy, Tenor Fly, and Dennis Brown. Singles released from the album included "The Wickedest Sound", "Comin' On Strong", and "Tribal Base" - to which their breakbeat hardcore and reggae fusion would give rise to an early precursor to the jungle sound.

His third album Word, Sound and Power (released in 1992, also featuring vocals from Spikey T and Little T ) represented further exploration of increasingly politicised awareness, breakbeat hardcore, house, conscious spiritual roots reggae, dubwise, and hip hop, with two singles "Rich Ah Getting Richer" and "I Can't Get No Sleep" released from it.The album opens with Rebel's version of Lincoln Thompson’s "Humanity (Love the Way It Should Be)", whilst the track "African Descendent" opens with a sample from Lloyd Coxsone's iconic King of the Dub Rock ( pt 2 ) Tribesman label album track, “Black Wars Reggae”, spliced with a vocal refrain chant from Johnny Clarke. "Rich Ah Getting Richer" was built on melodies and samples from Twinkle Brothers "Jahovia", Junior Byles, and King Tubby's'"Fade Away" as well as Junior Delgado's "Tichion." The track "Jahovia" samples the keyboard hook from the sound system favourite, "Kunta Kinte". Kunta Kinte, the film character from Alex Haley's book "Roots" inspired a reggae riddim of the same name, which started off life as a track called Beware Of Your Enemies released from Jamaica's Channel One. A dub version, put out in 1976 by Channel One house band The Revolutionaries became a sound system anthem for many years on dubplate, and inspired a UK version produced by Mad Professor in 1981. The track inspired Rebel MC and other jungle covers.

On Word, Sound and Power Rebel MC also built tracks around samples and melodies from Yabby You, Lincoln Thompson and the Royal Rasses ("Humanity"), and Burning Spear's "Creation Rebel."

The track "African" samples Lloyd Coxsone’s King of the Dub Rock part two, and Johnny Clarke’s vocals from Bunny Lee productions.

The album track “Revolution” is largely based on Dennis Brown’s track of the same name.

Whilst West was enjoying further commercial success with "Tribal Base" featuring Barrington Levy and Tenor Fly, he was also experimenting with white label releases on his X Project label. The first of these would be "Walking in the Air" (which contains samples from The Snowman track), followed by a further five releases which by this time were jungle.

West is often noted for having popularised the term "jungle". In the book Energy Flash by Simon Reynolds, MC Navigator of Kool FM is quoted as saying: "Rebel got this chant - 'all the junglists' - from a yard-tape" (referring to the sound system tapes from Kingston, Jamaica). "When Rebel sampled that, the people cottoned on, and soon they started to call the music 'jungle'".

In 1994, West converted to Rastafari. As Conquering Lion, he would release a classic jungle track "Code Red", with vocals from Super Cat. This was picked up for major release by Mango Records, a subsidiary of Island Records, which was followed by "Champion DJ" (featuring Top Cat) and "Junglist" (featuring Peter Bouncer), both released on his Congo Natty label that would be prolific in the mid-1990s to early 2000s.

In 2013, West returned with the album Jungle Revolution, featuring Jah Shaka's son, Young Warrior, General Levy, Top Cat, Tippa Irie, Tenor Fly, and Nãnci Correia.

== Discography ==
=== Albums ===
List of albums, with selected details and chart positions
Title	Details	Peak chart positions				
Title	Details	UK	AUS	NLD	NZ	SWE
Rebel Music	Released: 1990; Label: Desire	18	98	54	9	40
Black Meaning Good	Released: 1991; Label: Desire	23	—	—	—	—
Word, Sound and Power	Released: 1992; Label: Big Life	—	—	—	—	—
Tribute to Haile Selassie I	Released: 1995; Label: Congo Natty	—	—	—	—	—
Born Again	Released: 2005; Label: Congo Natty	—	—	—	—	—
Jungle Revolution	Released: 2013; Label: Big Dada	—	—	—	—	—
Ancestorz [Rootz of Jungle]	Released: 2022; Label: New State Music	—	—	—	—	—

=== Compilations ===
- Most Wanted (Congo Natty, 2008)

=== Singles ===
==== As Rebel MC ====
List of singles, with selected chart positions
Title	Year	Peak chart positions						Album
Title	Year	UK	AUS	BEL (FL)	NLD	NZ	SWE	Album
"Just Keep Rockin'" (with Double Trouble)	1989	11	—	14	3	—	—	Rebel Music
"Street Tuff" (with Double Trouble)	1989	3	85	7	3	29	12	Rebel Music
"Better World"	1989	20	131	22	14	4	—	Rebel Music
"Rebel Music"	1990	53	155	—	84	15	—	Rebel Music
"Culture"/"Comin' On Strong"	1990	90	—	—	—	—	—	Black Meaning Good
"The Wickedest Sound" (featuring Tenor Fly)	1991	43	—	—	—	—	—	Black Meaning Good
"Tribal Base" (featuring Tenor Fly and Barrington Levy)	1991	20	—	—	—	—	—	Black Meaning Good
"Black Meaning Good"	1992	73	—	—	—	—	—	Black Meaning Good
"Rich Ah Getting Richer"	1992	48	—	—	—	—	—	Word, Sound and Power
"Word, Sound and Power"	1992	—	—	—	—	—	—	Word, Sound and Power
"Humanity"/"I Can't Get No Sleep"	1992	62	—	—	—	—	—	Word, Sound and Power
"Under Me Sensi" (with Barrington Levy)	1992	—	—	—	—	—	—	Barrington

==== As X Project, Lion of Judah et al ====
- "Walking in the Air" (X Project, 1992)
- "The Calling"/"Jah Sunshine" (X Project, 1993)
- "Inahsound"/"Lion of Judah" (X Project, 1993)
- "Code Red" (as Conquering Lion) (X Project/Mango, 1994)
- "Champion DJ" (as Blackstar with Top Cat) (Congo Natty, 1994)
- "Junglist" (as Tribe of Issachar) (Congo Natty, 1995)
- "Jah Set It" (as Lion of Judah) (Congo Natty, 1996)
- "Emperor Selassie I" (as Lion of Judah) (Congo Natty, 1997)
