= Paolo Nutini discography =

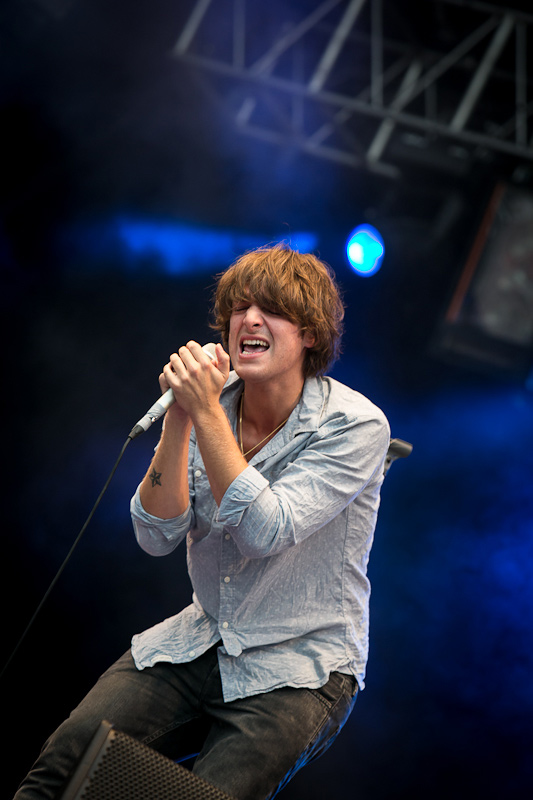
- Paolo Nutini performing in 2012
- Studio albums: 4
- Extended plays: 6
- Live albums: 1
- Singles: 9
- Music videos: 11

The discography of Paolo Nutini, a Scottish pop/rock singer, contains four studio albums, one live album, six extended plays, eight singles and ten music videos. Nutini's debut album, These Streets, was released by Atlantic Records in the United Kingdom in July 2006. The album peaked at number three on the UK Albums Chart and has been certified five-times platinum by the British Phonographic Industry. The album also peaked within the top twenty on the Australian Album Chart, French Album Chart, Irish Albums Chart and in the Dutch Album Chart. Singles released from the album were: "Last Request", "Jenny Don't Be Hasty", "Rewind" and "New Shoes". "Last Request" was the most successful, reaching number five on the UK Singles Chart and number eight on the Irish Singles Chart. In May 2009, Nutini released his second album, Sunny Side Up, which debuted at number one in the UK and in Ireland. It contained the singles: "Candy", "Coming Up Easy", "Pencil Full of Lead" and "10/10". Sunny Side Up has also been certified five-times platinum by the BPI and was the eighth biggest-selling album in the UK in 2009.

Nutini's most recent album Last Night in the Bittersweet was released in 2022, eight years after Caustic Love, which was released in April 2014. A single from that album, "Scream (Funk My Life Up)", was released in January 2014.

Nutini is also known for his live performances and numerous extended plays of some of his recordings. His first, the Live Sessions EP, was released in September 2006 and featured exclusive live versions of four fan favourite tracks mainly recorded in London. Recorded Live at Preservation Hall was released exclusively in the United States in March 2010 and features renditions of songs originally found on Sunny Side Up; it was then re-released as a limited edition album in independent record stores in April.

== Albums ==
=== Studio albums ===
List of albums, with selected chart positions, sales, and certifications
Title	Album details	Peak chart positions										Sales	Certifications
Title	Album details	UK	AUS	BEL	FRA	GER	IRE	ITA	NLD	SWI	US	Sales	Certifications
These Streets	Released: 17 July 2006; Label: Atlantic (#5101150172); Formats: CD, digital download	3	16	26	19	28	10	37	17	19	48	UK: 1.5 million; WW: 2.3 million	BPI: 6× Platinum; ARIA: Gold; FIMI: Gold; IFPI SWI: Platinum; IRMA: 2× Platinum; SNEP: Gold
Sunny Side Up	Released: 29 May 2009; Label: Atlantic (#825646901371); Formats: CD, digital download	1	39	15	25	15	1	12	18	3	57	UK: 1.8 million	BPI: 6× Platinum; FIMI: Platinum; IFPI SWI: Gold; IRMA: 4× Platinum
Caustic Love	Released: 14 April 2014; Label: Atlantic; Formats: CD, digital download	1	6	9	34	15	1	3	3	1	31	UK: 600,000	BPI: 2× Platinum; FIMI: Gold
Last Night in the Bittersweet	Released: 1 July 2022; Label: Atlantic; Formats: CD, LP, digital download	1	—	5	154	13	1	17	1	3	—		BPI: Gold
"—" denotes a recording that did not chart or was not released in that territory.

=== Live albums ===
Title	Album details
Live at the Barra's	Released: 26 February 2007; Label: Atlantic (#5101196722); Formats: CD, DVD

== Extended plays ==
Title	EP details
Live and Acoustic	Released: 29 May 2006; Label: Atlantic
Live Sessions	Released: 26 February 2007; Label: Atlantic
iTunes Festival: London	Released: 3 September 2007; Label: Atlantic
Live at Isle of Wight Festival	Released: 25 September 2007; Label: Atlantic
London Festival '09	Released: 1 June 2009; Label: Warner Music
Recorded Live at Preservation Hall	Released: 2 March 2010; Label: Warner Music

== Singles ==
List of singles, with selected chart positions, showing year released and album name
Single	Year	Peak chart positions										Certifications	Album
Single	Year	UK	AUS	BEL	FRA	GER	IRE	ITA	NLD	SWI	US AAA	Certifications	Album
"Last Request"	2006	5	67	59	20	65	8	15	—	42	3	BPI: 4× Platinum; FIMI: Gold	These Streets
"Jenny Don't Be Hasty"	2006	20	40	—	—	59	38	—	69	56	9	BPI: Platinum	These Streets
"Rewind"	2006	27	—	—	—	—	—	—	—	—	—	BPI: Silver	These Streets
"New Shoes"	2007	21	—	—	—	97	35	— (Note: "New Shoes" did not chart on the Italian Singles Chart, but it peaked at number 20 on the Italian FIMI Top Digital Downloads Chart in May 2007.)	42	52	1	BPI: 2× Platinum; FIMI: Gold	These Streets
"Candy"	2009	19	—	66	—	62	25	20	—	10	29	BPI: 3× Platinum; FIMI: Gold; SWI: Gold	Sunny Side Up
"Coming Up Easy"	2009	62	—	59	—	—	—	—	—	— (Note: "Coming Up Easy" did not enter the Swiss Singles chart, but charted at number 72 on the Swiss Airplay chart.)	—	BPI: Gold	Sunny Side Up
"Pencil Full of Lead"	2009	17	—	—	—	—	33	—	—	—	—	BPI: Platinum	Sunny Side Up
"10/10"	2010	51	—	—	—	—	—	—	—	—	—	BPI: Gold	Sunny Side Up
"Scream (Funk My Life Up)"	2014	12	—	69	—	—	22	76	90	56	—	BPI: Gold	Caustic Love
"Let Me Down Easy"	2014	47	—	52	182	—	—	—	— (Note: "Let Me Down Easy" did not enter the Netherlands' Single Top 100 but peaked on the Netherlands' Single Tip Chart at number 21.)	— (Note: "Let Me Down Easy" did not enter the Swiss Singles chart, but charted at number 98 on the Swiss Airplay chart.)	2	BPI: Silver	Caustic Love
"Iron Sky"	2014	42	—	57	—	—	96	71	24	—	—	BPI: Platinum; FIMI: Gold	Caustic Love
"One Day"	2014	— (Note: "One Day" did not enter the UK Singles Chart, but peaked at number 96 on the UK Streaming Chart.)	—	62	—	—	—	—	—	—	—		Caustic Love
"Through the Echoes"	2022	46	—	—	—	—	76	—	— (Note: "Through the Echoes" did not enter the Netherlands' Single Top 100 but peaked on the Netherlands' Airplay Chart at number 25.)	— (Note: "Through the Echoes" did not enter the Swiss Singles chart, but charted at number 97 on the Swiss Airplay chart.)	—	BPI: Gold	Last Night in the Bittersweet
"Lose It"	2022	—	—	—	—	—	—	—	—	—	—		Last Night in the Bittersweet
"Shine a Light"	2022	—	—	—	—	—	—	—	—	—	—		Last Night in the Bittersweet
"—" denotes single that did not chart or was not released

== Other charted and certified songs ==
List of other charted and certified songs, with selected chart positions and certifications, showing year released and album name
Song	Year	Peak chart positions					Certifications	Album
Song	Year	UK	FRA	IRE	ITA	SCO	Certifications	Album
"These Streets"	2006	—	—	—	—	—	BPI: Silver	These Streets
"Loving You"	2006	—	—	—	—	—	BPI: Silver	These Streets
"No Other Way"	2009	—	—	—	—	—	BPI: Silver	Sunny Side Up
"Better Man"	2014	40	169	34	86	24	BPI: Silver	Caustic Love
"Acid Eyes"	2022	98	—	—	—	—	BPI: Silver	Last Night in the Bittersweet
"—" denotes song that did not chart or was not released in that territory.

== Music videos ==
List of music videos, showing year released and director
Song	Year	Director(s)
"Last Request"	2006	Charles Mehling
"Last Request" (US version)	2006	Charles Mehling
"Jenny Don't Be Hasty"	2006	Paul Gore
"Rewind"	2006	Jeff Thomas
"New Shoes"	2007	Charles Mehling / Rob Hall
"New Shoes" (US version)	2007	Luke & Gav
"Candy"	2009	Nez
"Coming Up Easy"	2009	Dan and Julian
"Pencil Full of Lead"	2009	Corin Hardy
"10/10"	2010	Compilation of live performances and behind the scenes footage
"Scream (Funk My Life Up)"	2014	Nez

== Other appearances ==
List of songs recorded by Nutini which haven't appeared on any of his albums
Song	Year	Album
"It Must Be Love" (Madness cover)	2007	Radio 1 Established 1967
"Rehab" (Amy Winehouse cover performed live)	2007	Radio 1's Live Lounge – Volume 2
"Duo" (Zazie featuring Paolo Nutini)	2007	Totem
"What a Wonderful World" (Louis Armstrong cover, live at the Live Earth concert, London)	2007	Live Earth: The Concerts for a Climate in Crisis
"Covers" (The View featuring Paolo Nutini)	2009	Which Bitch?
"Gimme Shelter" (The Rolling Stones cover)	2009	Gimme Shelter (2009 Film)
"Between the Devil and the Deep Blue Sea" (Preservation Hall Jazz Band featuring Paolo Nutini)	2010	Preservation: An Album to Benefit Preservation Hall & the Preservation Hall Music Outreach Program
"Only Good for Conversation" (Dennis Coffey featuring Paolo Nutini)	2011	Dennis Coffey
"One World" (John Martyn cover)	2011	Johnny Boy Would Love This... A Tribute to John Martyn
"Hard Times Come Again No More" (The Chieftains featuring Paolo Nutini & City of Limerick Pipe Band)	2012	Voice of Ages
"Fade into You" (Mazzy Star cover)	2022	BBC Piano Room

== Writing credits ==
List of songs written or co-written by Nutini and performed by other artists
Song and co-writers	Year	Artist	Album	Notes
"Mangialanima" (originally titled "Make You Mine") (Written with Jim Duguid and John Frederick Fortis, adapted by Dente)	2011	Marco Mengoni	Solo 2.0	Nutini was credited under the pseudonym Glen Byrne
