= Caustic Love =

Studio album by Paolo Nutini
- Released: 14 April 2014
- Recorded: 2013
- Genre: Soul; R&B
- Length: 51:34
- Label: Atlantic
- Producer: Paolo Nutini, Dani Castelar

Paolo Nutini chronology
Sunny Side Up (2009)	Caustic Love (2014)	Last Night in the Bittersweet (2022)

Singles from Caustic Love
- 1. "Scream (Funk My Life Up)" Released: 28 January 2014; 2. "Let Me Down Easy" Released: 17 June 2014; 3. "Iron Sky" Released: 14 August 2014; 4. "One Day" Released: 30 November 2014

Caustic Love is the third studio album by Scottish singer-songwriter Paolo Nutini, released on 14 April 2014 by Atlantic Records. After releasing his critically and commercially successful album Sunny Side Up (2009), Nutini toured for two years. In February 2011, Nutini began writing and recording the album Caustic Love, which he co-produced with Dani Castelar.

Upon release, Caustic Love was met with positive reviews from music critics, who noted the album as "the best UK R&B album since the 1970s blue-eyed-soul heyday." Commercially the album was a success; it debuted at number one on the UK Albums Chart with 109,000 copies sold, making it the fastest-selling album of the year in the region. It was also selected on 8 December 2014 by Apple to become the Best Album in iTunes' 'Best of 2014'.

The album was preceded by the single "Scream (Funk My Life Up)", released as a digital download on 28 January 2014 and as a physical single on 30 March 2014.

== Background ==
In May 2009, Nutini released his second album, Sunny Side Up, which debuted at number one in the UK and in Ireland. It contained the singles: "Candy", "Coming Up Easy", "Pencil Full of Lead" and "10/10". Sunny Side Up has also been certified five-times platinum by the BPI and was the eighth-biggest-selling album in the UK in 2009. In December 2013 he announced via social networks that his new album Caustic Love would be released in April 2014 - Friday 11 April in Ireland, Monday 14 April in UK.

== Recording ==
As of February 2011, Paolo Nutini was in the studio working on new material. He toured for two years after the release of his second studio album, followed by a hiatus from music in which he went home and "spent a good few months partying there, then I detoxed, then I retoxed." During this time Nutini was "writing along and recording little bits," for the following two years Nutini put the "spotlight" on the album stating he had "never written as much, but I had to take a bit of time. My writing used to come from a different place. I used to be more picky and there used to be a more pop sensibility to what I would naturally come up with." This was followed by Nutini writing "nothing but poetry", although he hated the notion of "trying to turn it into a verse-chorus-verse-chorus-type song, and struggled with it and got no pleasure from it whatsoever." The album's recording took place in a variety of locations, including Grouse Lodge Studios in Ireland; RAK Studios, Sarm Studios, Studio 45, The Premises, The Strong Room in London; Studio Barxeta in Valencia, Spain; Sunset Sound in Los Angeles; The Old Police Station as well as Cava Sound in Glasgow and Toy Room Studios in Brighton.

== Singles ==
"Scream (Funk My Life Up)" was released as the album's lead single on 28 January 2014. A music video, directed by Nez, was released on YouTube on 10 March 2014 and a physical single released on 30 March 2014. The song peaked at number 12 on the UK Singles Chart and number 5 in Scotland. The song has also charted in Belgium and Switzerland.

Initially a non-charting single in the Netherlands, the song Iron Sky was revived by radio station 3FM in early 2015 following the Paris shootings at the Charlie Hebdo offices on 7 January 2015. It was rush re-released as a single and only a week later reached number 15 in 3FM's Mega Top 50 chart.

== Critical reception ==
Professional ratings
Aggregate scores
Source	Rating
Metacritic	79/100
Review scores
Source	Rating
AllMusic	4/5 stars
Clash	7/10
The Guardian	4/5 stars
The Independent	5/5 stars
The Daily Telegraph	4/5 stars

Caustic Love received positive reviews from music critics, holding a score of 79/100 on Metacritic, indicating, "generally favourable reviews". In a very positive review, The Independent called the album an "unqualified success", later going on to say it may be "the best UK R&B album since the 1970s blue-eyed-soul heyday of Rod Stewart and Joe Cocker."

== Chart performance ==
Caustic Love debuted at number one on the Irish Albums Chart, outselling the same week's number 2, The Vamps' Meet the Vamps, by five copies to one. In the United Kingdom, as of 20 April 2014, the album had sold 109,000 copies therefore, making it the fastest selling album of the year, beating Sam Bailey's The Power of Love, which sold 72,644 copies in its debut week. The album held on to the top spot of the UK charts for a second week, bringing its total sales up to 162,000 copies. The album would go on to spend a third week at number one, bringing its sales to 198,000 copies.

== Track listing ==
All tracks are produced by Paolo Nutini and Dan Castelar, unless noted otherwise.

No.	Title	Writer(s)	Producer(s)	Length
1.	"Scream (Funk My Life Up)"	Paolo Nutini		3:09
2.	"Let Me Down Easy"	Nutini; James McDougal; Rollo Armstrong; Wrecia Holloway		3:32
3.	"Bus Talk" (interlude)	Eddie Holland; Lamont Dozier; Van McCoy		1:30
4.	"One Day"	Nutini; Leo Abrahams	Nutini; Castelar; Abrahams	5:06
5.	"Numpty"	Nutini	Nutini; Castelar; Abrahams	3:54
6.	"Superfly" (interlude)	Nutini; Abrahams	Nutini; Castelar; Abrahams	1:13
7.	"Better Man"	Nutini		5:29
8.	"Iron Sky"	Nutini; Charlie Chaplin; Dave Nelson		6:13
9.	"Diana"	Nutini; Nelson		3:35
10.	"Fashion" (featuring Janelle Monáe)	Nutini; Abrahams; Monáe	Nutini; Castelar; Abrahams; Dave Sardy	3:06
11.	"Looking for Something"	Nutini; Michael McDaid		6:21
12.	"Cherry Blossom"	Nutini; Nelson; McDaid; Donny Little; Gavin Fitzjohn; Thomas Simon		6:17
13.	"Someone like You"	Nutini		2:09

== Notes ==
- "Let Me Down Easy" contains a sample of "Let Me Down Easy" by Bettye LaVette.
- "Bus Talk [Interlude]" contains a sample of "Stop! In the Name of Love" as performed by Margie Joseph, and of "Giving Up" by Gladys Knight & the Pips.
- "Iron Sky" contains a sample of the 1940 Charlie Chaplin film The Great Dictator.

== Charts ==
=== Weekly charts ===
Chart (2014–15)	Peak position
Australian Albums (ARIA)	6
Austrian Albums (Ö3 Austria)	13
Belgian Albums (Ultratop Flanders)	13
Belgian Albums (Ultratop Wallonia)	27
Canadian Albums (Billboard)	21
Danish Albums (Hitlisten)	37
Dutch Albums (Album Top 100)	3
French Albums (SNEP)	34
German Albums (Offizielle Top 100)	15
Hungarian Albums (MAHASZ)	2
Irish Albums (IRMA)	1
Italian Albums (FIMI)	3
New Zealand Albums (RMNZ)	5
Scottish Albums (OCC)	1
Spanish Albums (PROMUSICAE)	50
Swiss Albums (Schweizer Hitparade)	1
UK Albums (OCC)	1
US Billboard 200	31

Chart (2025)	Peak position
Greek Albums (IFPI)	36

=== Year-end charts ===
Chart (2014)	Position
Belgian Albums (Ultratop Flanders)	35
Belgian Albums (Ultratop Wallonia)	189
Dutch Albums (MegaCharts)	43
Swiss Albums (Schweizer Hitparade)	47
UK Albums (OCC)	4

Chart (2015)	Position
Belgian Albums (Ultratop Flanders)	96
Dutch Albums (Album Top 100)	38
UK Albums (OCC)	51

=== Decade-end charts ===
Chart (2010–2019)	Position
UK Albums (OCC)	90

== Certifications ==
Region	Certification	Certified units/sales
Italy (FIMI)	Gold	25,000^{*}
Netherlands (NVPI)	Gold	25,000^{^}
New Zealand (RMNZ)	Gold	7,500^{‡}
United Kingdom (BPI)	2× Platinum	600,000^{^}
^{*} Sales figures based on certification alone.^{^} Shipments figures based on certification alone.^{‡} Sales+streaming figures based on certification alone.

== Release history ==
Region	Date	Format	Label
United Kingdom	14 April 2014	CD, digital download	Atlantic Records
Italy	15 April 2014	CD, digital download	Atlantic Records
United States	16 September 2014	CD, digital download	Atlantic Records

== See also ==
- List of UK Albums Chart number ones of the 2010s
