= Live Earth concert, London =

Concert event

Live Earth
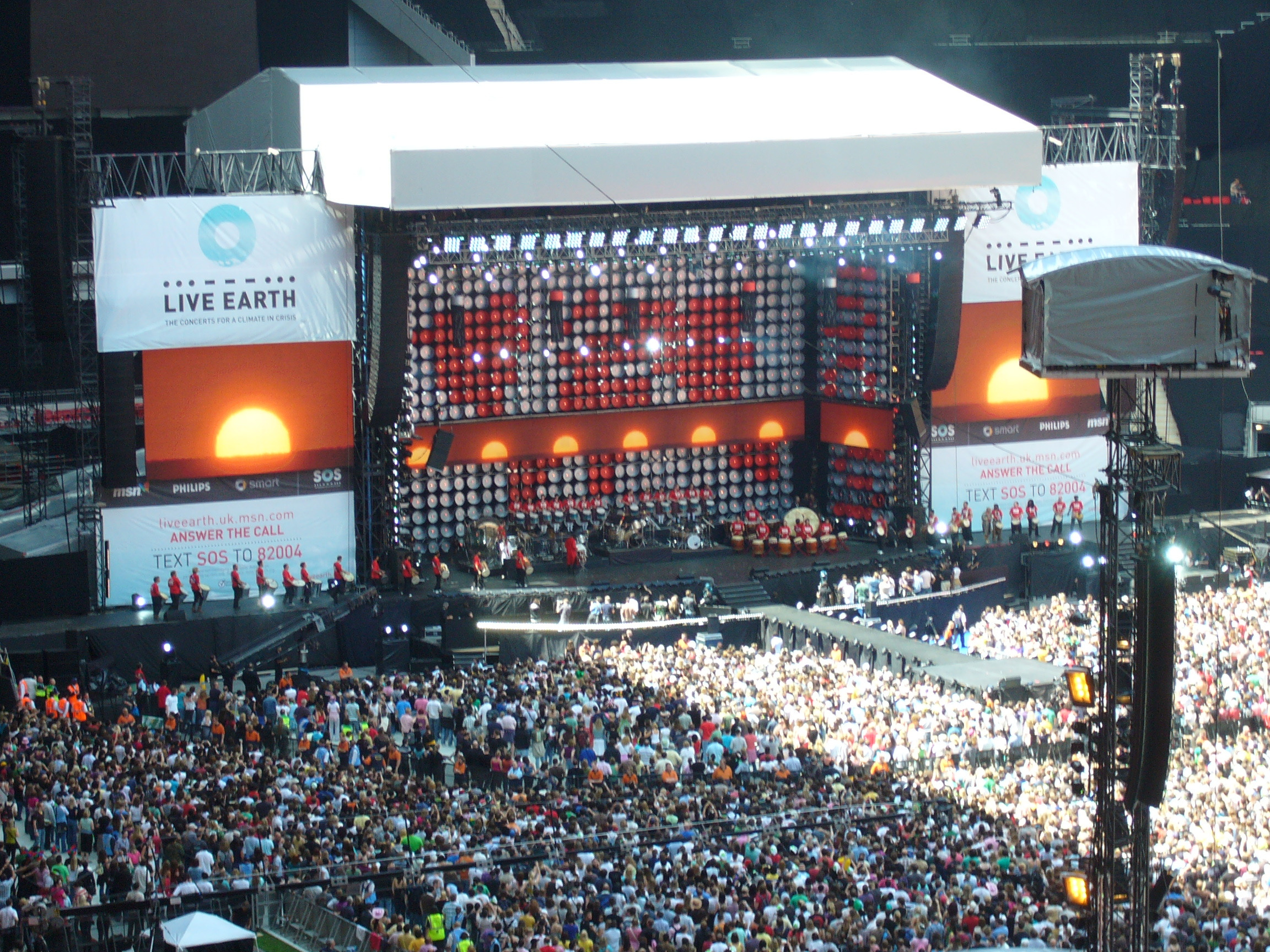
- Genre: Pop and Rock music
- Dates: 7 July 2007; 19 years ago
- Locations: Wembley Stadium, London, England
- Founders: Al Gore and Kevin Wall
- Website: Live Earth UK Site

The Live Earth concert in London, England was held at Wembley Stadium on 7 July 2007.

== Lineup ==
- SOS Allstars (led by Roger Taylor, Chad Smith, and Taylor Hawkins) (W 13:30)
- Chris Moyles (presenter) (W 13:55)
- Genesis - "Behind the Lines"/"Duke's End", "Turn It On Again", "Land of Confusion" and "Invisible Touch" (W 14:00)
- Eddie Izzard (presenter) (W 14:25)
- Razorlight - "In The Morning", "America" and "Los Angeles Waltz" (W 14:30)
- Alan Carr (presenter) (W 14:55)
- Snow Patrol - "Open Your Eyes", "Shut Your Eyes" and "Chasing Cars" (W 15:00)
- Damien Rice and David Gray - "Babylon" (Gray solo performance, Rice on backing rhythm), "The Blower's Daughter (Rice solo performance, Gray on backing rhythm) and "Que Sera Sera" (W 15:25)
- Gerard Butler (presenter) (W 15:40)
- Kasabian - "Empire", "Club Foot" and "L.S.F." (W 15:45)
- Thandiwe Newton (presenter) (W 16:00)
- Al Gore (speech) (W 16:05)
- Paolo Nutini - "Alloway Groove", "Last Request", "What a Wonderful World" and "Jenny Don't Be Hasty" (W 16:10)
- June Sarpong (presenter) (W 16:35)
- The Black Eyed Peas - "Pump It", "Let's Get It Started", "Big Girls Don't Cry" (Fergie solo performance), "Help Us Out" (will.i.am solo performance) and "Where Is The Love?" (W 17:00)
- John Legend - "Ordinary People" (W 17:25)
- Geri Halliwell (presenter) (W 17:40)
- Duran Duran - "Planet Earth", "Ordinary World", "Notorious/I Want To Take You Higher" and "Girls on Film" (W 17:45)
- Chris Rock (presenter) (W 18:10)
- Red Hot Chili Peppers - "Can't Stop", "Dani California", "So Much I" and "By the Way" (W 18:17)
- Neve Campbell (presenter) (W 18:40)
- Bloc Party - "Banquet", "So Here We Are" and "The Prayer" (W 18:45)
- Kyle MacLachlan (presenter) (W 19:10)
- Ashok Sinha (speech) (W 19:15)
- Corinne Bailey Rae - "I'd Like To", "Mercy Mercy Me" (with John Legend) and "Put Your Records On" (W 19:20)
- Terra Naomi - "Say It's Possible" (W 19:45)
- Ioan Gruffudd (presenter) (W 20:00)
- Keane - "Somewhere Only We Know", "Is It Any Wonder?" and "Bedshaped" (W 20:05)
- Russell Brand (presenter) (W 20:30)
- Metallica - "Sad but True", "3rd Stone From The Sun/Nothing Else Matters" and "Enter Sandman" (W 20:35)
- Ricky Gervais (presenter) (W 20:50)
- Spinal Tap - "Stonehenge", "Warmer Than Hell", and "Big Bottom" (with every bass guitar player from the event except Mike Rutherford and John Taylor) (W 20:55)
- Russell Brand (presenter) (W 21:20)
- Boris Becker (presenter) (W 21:25)
- James Blunt - "Wisemen", "Wild World", and "Same Mistake" (W 21:30)
- Russell Brand (presenter) (W 21:55)
- Beastie Boys - "Sure Shot", "So What'cha Want", "Intergalactic", "Sabotage" (W 22:00)
- Russell Brand (presenter) (W 22:25)
- David Tennant (presenter) (W 22:30)
- Pussycat Dolls - "Buttons", "Stickwitu" and "Don't Cha" (W 22:35)
- Russell Brand (presenter) (W 22:50)
- Foo Fighters - "All My Life", "My Hero", "Times Like These", "Best of You" and "Everlong" (W 22:55) ("We decided to play the ones that everyone knew…" said Dave Grohl. "I felt like I was being challenged by all of the bands before me. I'm not a competitive dude. But I thought, 'Okay motherfuckers: watch this.'")
- Kevin Wall (speech) (W 23:30)
- Russell Brand (presenter) (W 23:35)
- Terence Stamp (speech) (W 23:40)
- Madonna - "Hey You", "Ray of Light", "La Isla Bonita" (with Eugene Hütz and Sergey Ryabtsev) and "Hung Up" (W 23:45)
- Russell Brand (wrap-up) (W 00:10)

== Coverage ==
=== Television ===
- In Britain, the BBC provided live television coverage of the show on BBC Two, followed by BBC One later on, BBC Radio 1, and BBC HD. The television coverage was presented by Jonathan Ross, Graham Norton and Edith Bowman. Coverage commenced at 13:00 on BBC Two and concluded at 17:20 continuing on BBC One at 17:30.
- In Ireland, RTÉ Two provided live coverage starting from 12:30 until 19:00 and then again from 21:30 until 06:00 the following morning, presented by Dave Fanning.
- In Canada, CTVglobemedia provided uninterrupted live television coverage of the show on MuchMoreMusic. Highlights of the show were featured on CTV throughout the day.

=== Online ===
MSN was responsible for the online broadcasting of the concert.

== Controversy ==
Chris Rock's explicit language during the introduction of the Red Hot Chili Peppers caused problems with Canadian TV networks and the BBC. Rock also used the word "nigger" while being interviewed on BBC One by Jonathan Ross, alongside Ricky Gervais. Rock called the crowd "motherfuckers" and Jonathan Ross had to apologize to the viewers. He was unrepentant in later NME interviews.

The BBC missed the start of the Metallica set, joining live halfway through the first song, then switched to Crowded House from Sydney just as they started to play "Enter Sandman". This resulted in 413 complaints from Metallica fans who watched the concert from home.

Phil Collins sang during "Invisible Touch", "And though she will fuck up your life, you'll want her just the same." Collins has sung this as part of many Genesis concerts. BBC presenter Jonathan Ross was required to apologize on air for the expletives used by Collins and Johnny Borrell of Razorlight and vowed to give them a "talking to". The offensive language used by performers at the event and broadcast live before the watershed caused the BBC to be censured by media regulator Ofcom.
