= Jim Duguid =

Scottish musician and songwriter

Jim Duguid is a Scottish musician and songwriter best known for co-writing Paolo Nutini Album "These Streets and the Alex Clare song "Too Close".

== Biography ==
A native of Glasgow, Duguid cut his teeth playing drums in a number of bands which centred around the vibrant 90's Glasgow music scene and the iconic King Tuts Wah Wah Hut. His drumming career began with the band Speedway, which he founded with fellow Glaswegian Jill Jackson in 2001. He developed his songwriting in sessions with Steve Robson, Guy Chambers and Star Gate. Speedway released one full-length album, Save Yourself (2003), before disbanding in 2004.

Following Speedway's breakup, he began a collaboration with Scottish singer Paolo Nutini, co-writing five tracks on Nutini's first album, These Streets. Credits included hit singles "Rewind", "Last Request" and the number-1 UK airplay hit, "New Shoes". Duguid toured extensively with Nutini, as his drummer and piano player. The album has sold over three million copies to date. In 2008 after the first recording sessions for Nutini's second album, Sunny Side Up and after seven years working with Nutini, Duguid took the difficult decision to leave the band.

Published by Warner Chappell UK, Duguid set himself up in a studio in London in 2009, working with developing young artists, including early sessions with Sam Smith, James Bay and Alex Clare.

On Alex Clare's 2011 album The Lateness of the Hour, he co-wrote the hit song "Too Close".

His biggest hit to date, the song was used for a major Internet Explorer ad campaign in 2011. "Too Close" was number 1 in Germany, top 5 in the U.K. and top 10 throughout Europe.

In the U.S. the track's hit status was solidified, spending over 50 weeks in the hot 100 chart, peaking at number 7. It topped the Rock radio Chart and spent a number of weeks in the mainstream AirPlay top 10. To date the song has sold almost five million copies around the world, has had over 65 million views on YouTube and over 100 million Spotify streams.

Duguid and Clare received the ASCAP, PRS Songwriter of the Year Award in 2012.

He currently works from his home studio just outside London. He has been working on releases for 2017/18 with Kiko Bun (Universal), Callum Beattie (3 beat/Universal), Dan Owen (Atlantic Records), Lukas Graham and US newcomer Molly Kestner (Atlantic Records).

== Songwriting credits ==
Year	Artist	Song	Co-written with	U.S. peak position	U.K. peak position
2017	Molly Kate Kestner	"Prom Queen"	Adj Buffone, Molly Kate Kestner	—	—
2006	Paolo Nutini	"Last Request"	Paolo Nutini, Matty Benbrook	—	5
2006	Paolo Nutini	"Rewind"	Paolo Nutini	_	27
2007	Paolo Nutini	"New Shoes"	Paolo Nutini, Matty Benbrook	108	21
2011	Alex Clare	"Too Close	Alex Clare	7	4
