= Jill Jackson =

Jill Jackson is the name of:

- Jill Jackson (Paul & Paula) (born 1942), half of American pop duo Paul & Paula
- Jill Jackson, (born 1979), Scottish singer-songwriter and ex-frontwoman for Speedway (band)
