= Save Yourself =

Save Yourself may refer to:

== Music ==
=== Albums ===
- Save Yourself (McAuley Schenker Group album), 1989
- Save Yourself (Speedway album), 2004
- Save Yourself (The Make-Up album), 1999
- Save Yourself, a 2016 album by SBTRKT

=== Songs ===
- "Save Yourself" (Stabbing Westward song), 1998
- "Save Yourself" (The Chainsmokers and Nghtmre song), 2018
- "Save Yourself", the title track from McAuley Schenker Group's 1989 album
- "Save Yourself", the title track from Speedway's 2004 album
- "Save Yourself", the title track from The Make-Up's 1999 album
- "Save Yourself, I'll Hold Them Back", a song by My Chemical Romance from Danger Days: The True Lives of the Fabulous Killjoys
- "Save Yourself", a song by One Ok Rock, 2022

== Television and film ==
- "Save Yourself" (True Blood), an episode of True Blood
- Save Yourself (film), a 2015 Canadian horror film
