= Sunny Side Up (Paolo Nutini album) =

Studio album by Paolo Nutini

Studio album by Paolo Nutini
- Released: 29 May 2009
- Recorded: 2008–2009
- Studio: Real World (Box, UK)
- Genre: Pop; folk
- Length: 38:32
- Label: Atlantic
- Producer: Paolo Nutini, Ethan Johns

Paolo Nutini chronology
These Streets (2006)	Sunny Side Up (2009)	Caustic Love (2014)

Singles from Sunny Side Up
- 1. "Candy" Released: 18 May 2009; 2. "Coming Up Easy" Released: 10 August 2009; 3. "Pencil Full of Lead" Released: 2 November 2009; 4. "10/10" Released: 11 January 2010

Sunny Side Up is the second studio album by Scottish singer and songwriter Paolo Nutini, released on 29 May 2009 in Ireland and 1 June 2009 in the United Kingdom. Nutini and his band, the Vipers, embarked on a brief tour of the United States before a UK tour leading up to the album's release. The album debuted at number one on the UK Albums Chart. Nutini self-recorded the album with his band the Vipers, while Ethan Johns contributed to the mixing and production. Notably, the album includes guest appearances from trombonist Rico Rodriguez and Questlove.

The album was the eighth best-selling album in the United Kingdom in 2009 and the sixth best-selling album in 2010. On 3 January 2010, Sunny Side Up topped the UK Albums Chart for a second time, making it the first number-one album in the United Kingdom in 2010 and the entire decade.

On 19 February 2010, Colin Farrell presented Nutini with "Best International Album" for Sunny Side Up at the 2010 Meteor Awards. On 20 May 2010, Sunny Side Up won Best Album at the Ivor Novello Awards. The album was nominated for MasterCard British Album at the 2010 BRIT Awards.

== Singles ==
The first single from the album was "Candy", which reached No. 19 on the UK Singles Charts. The song is Nutini's third highest peak to date, after "Last Request" and "Pencil Full of Lead" (see below). The second single was "Coming Up Easy", reaching No. 62 on the UK Singles Chart. The song became his lowest charting single to date, spending just one week within the top 75.

The third single to be released was "Pencil Full of Lead". The song was released on 2 November 2009 and peaked at No. 17 on the UK Singles Charts. It is his second highest chart success and the biggest hit single from Sunny Side Up, spending 21 weeks inside the top 75. The fourth single from the album was "10/10". The song was released on 11 January 2010 as a digital download only single. Once "10/10" was released, the song debuted at No. 100 on the UK Singles Charts, peaking at #51. It spent a total of six weeks inside the top 75.

== Critical reception ==
Professional ratings
Aggregate scores
Source	Rating
Metacritic	64/100
Review scores
Source	Rating
AllMusic	3.5/5 stars
The Guardian	3/5 stars
The Independent	(favourable)
MusicOMH	2.5/5 stars
The Observer	(neutral)
Sunday Mercury	(unfavourable)
The Daily Telegraph	5/5 stars
The Times	3/5 stars

The album received a generally favourable critical reception. AllMusic's Thom Jurek noted the move away from the sound of These Streets: "Nutini has taken huge chunks of America's (and Scotland's) pop and folk pasts and reshaped them in his own image," going on to describe it as "wise beyond this songwriter's years". Andy Gill of The Independent commented on Nutini's progress since his debut, saying the album "sees the singer making giant strides in several directions", and going on to say "don't be surprised if, come December, this is one of the year's biggest-selling albums." Neil McCormick of The Daily Telegraph was also positive, stating "his joyous second album organically blends soul, country, folk and the brash, horny energy of ragtime swing."

Some reviewers were less impressed. It was described by The Guardian's Caroline Sullivan as "not bad", with opening track "10/10" described as "jaunty enough to make you retch". Graeme Thomson of The Observer saw the album as an attempt by Nutini at "rebranding himself as a mongrel hybrid of John Martyn, Otis Redding and Bob Marley".

== Commercial performance ==
The album debuted at number one on the UK Albums Chart with sales of over 60,000 copies, fighting off strong competition from Love & War, the debut album of fellow male solo artist Daniel Merriweather. The album performed similarly well on the Irish Albums Chart, debuting at number two behind Eminem's new album before rising to the top of the charts the week after.

== Track listing ==
All tracks are written by Paolo Nutini, except where noted.

No.	Title	Writer(s)	Length
1.	"10/10"		2:56
2.	"Coming Up Easy"	Nutini, Matty Benbrook	4:18
3.	"Growing Up Beside You"	Nutini, Dave Nelson	3:23
4.	"Candy"		4:58
5.	"Tricks of the Trade"		2:32
6.	"Pencil Full of Lead"		2:26
7.	"No Other Way"	Nutini, Nelson	4:25
8.	"High Hopes"		2:57
9.	"Chamber Music"	Nutini, Nelson	2:27
10.	"Simple Things"		2:33
11.	"Worried Man"	Traditional	3:01
12.	"Keep Rolling"		2:36

iTunes-bonus tracks
No.	Title	Writer(s)	Length
13.	"Smokey Joe's Cafe" (The Robins cover)	Jerry Leiber, Mike Stoller	2:43
14.	"Funky Cigarette"		2:29

== Personnel ==
- Paolo Nutini – vocals, backing vocals, drums, percussion, acoustic guitar, piano
- Donny Little – acoustic guitar, electric guitar, backing vocals
- Mike McDaid – bass guitar, piano, Fender Rhodes, backing vocals
- Dave Nelson – acoustic guitar, percussion, backing vocals
- Seamus Simon – drums, percussion
- Gavin Fitzjohn – tenor saxophone, baritone saxophone, trumpet, flugelhorn
- Rico Rodriguez – trombone
- Questlove – drums
- James Poyser – piano
- Ethan Johns – Hammond organ, celesta, mandolin, mellotron, omnichord, electric guitar, acoustic guitar, ukulele, Dobro, mandocello, bass guitar, baritone guitar, optigan, percussion
- Matt Benbrook – bass guitar
- Phil Cunningham – accordion, tin whistle
- Simon Farrell – double bass
- Steve Bentley Klein, Andrew Maddick – violin
- Fiona Leggat – viola
- Emma Wallace – cello
- Malcolm Stevenson – backing vocals
- Derek Green – backing vocals
- Andy Gaine – backing vocals
- Lance Ellington – backing vocals
- Ricci P. Washington – backing vocals
- Miguan A. Green – backing vocals
- Fraser Speirs - harmonicas

== Charts ==
=== Weekly charts ===
Weekly chart performance for Sunny Side Up
Chart (2009)	Peak position
Australian Albums (ARIA)	39
Austrian Albums (Ö3 Austria)	34
Belgian Albums (Ultratop Flanders)	15
Belgian Albums (Ultratop Wallonia)	40
Canadian Albums (Billboard)	19
Dutch Albums (Album Top 100)	18
European Top 100 Albums (Billboard)	4
French Albums (SNEP)	25
German Albums (Offizielle Top 100)	15
Hungarian Albums (MAHASZ)	27
Irish Albums (IRMA)	1
Italian Albums (FIMI)	12
Scottish Albums (OCC)	1
Swiss Albums (Schweizer Hitparade)	3
UK Albums (OCC)	1
US Billboard 200	57

=== Year-end charts ===
2009 year-end chart performance for Sunny Side Up
Chart (2009)	Position
European Top 100 Albums (Billboard)	40
French Albums (SNEP)	191
Irish Albums (IRMA)	9
Italian Albums (FIMI)	87
Swiss Albums (Schweizer Hitparade)	52
UK Albums (OCC)	8

2010 year-end chart performance for Sunny Side Up
Chart (2010)	Position
European Top 100 Albums (Billboard)	17
Irish Albums (IRMA)	8
UK Albums (OCC)	6

=== Decade-end charts ===
Decade-end chart performance for Sunny Side Up
Chart (2010–2019)	Position
UK Albums (OCC)	40

== Certifications ==
Region	Certification	Certified units/sales
GCC (IFPI Middle East)	Gold	3,000^{*}
Ireland (IRMA)	4× Platinum	60,000^{^}
Italy (FIMI)	Platinum	50,000^{‡}
Switzerland (IFPI Switzerland)	Gold	15,000^{^}
United Kingdom (BPI)	6× Platinum	1,800,000^{*}
Summaries
Europe (IFPI)	2× Platinum	2,000,000^{*}
^{*} Sales figures based on certification alone.^{^} Shipments figures based on certification alone.^{‡} Sales+streaming figures based on certification alone.
