= Let Me Down Easy (Paolo Nutini song) =

Single by Paolo Nutini and Bettye LaVette

from the album Caustic Love
- Released: 17 June 2014
- Recorded: 2013
- Genre: Soul
- Length: 3:32
- Label: Atlantic
- Songwriter(s): Wrecia Holloway, James McDougal, Paolo Nutini, Rollo Armstrong

Paolo Nutini and Bettye LaVette singles chronology
"Scream (Funk My Life Up)" (2014)	"Let Me Down Easy" (2014)	"Iron Sky" (2014)

"Let Me Down Easy" is a song by Scottish pop/rock singer Paolo Nutini. The song was released as the second single from his third studio album, Caustic Love. It was released on 17 June 2014. This song is a blended duet incorporating the song with the same name by Bettye LaVette. It is featured in the movie Alien: Covenant.

== Charts ==
=== Weekly charts ===
Chart (2014)	Peak position
Belgium (Ultratip Bubbling Under Flanders)	2
France (SNEP)	182
US Adult Alternative Songs (Billboard)	2

=== Year-end charts ===
Chart (2014)	Position
US Adult Alternative Songs (Billboard)	46

== Certifications ==
Region	Certification	Certified units/sales
United Kingdom (BPI)	Silver	200,000^{‡}
^{‡} Sales+streaming figures based on certification alone.
