= Candy (Paolo Nutini song) =

2009 single by Paolo Nutini

Single by Paolo Nutini

from the album Sunny Side Up
- Released: 18 May 2009
- Recorded: 2009
- Genre: Folk rock
- Length: 4:58 (album version); 3:38 (radio edit)
- Label: Atlantic UK
- Songwriter: Paolo Nutini
- Producers: Paolo Nutini, Ethan Johns

Paolo Nutini singles chronology
"New Shoes" (2007)	"Candy" (2009)	"Coming Up Easy" (2009)

Music video
- "Candy" on YouTube

"Candy" is a song from Paolo Nutini which was released on 18 May 2009. The song is the lead single from his second studio album Sunny Side Up. The song was released as a single eleven days before the release of Sunny Side Up.

== Release and reception ==
The single made the A-list on BBC Radio 1 and BBC Radio 2, as well as the B-list on Absolute Radio. It charted at number 19 on the UK Singles Chart, making it his third highest-charting single behind "Last Request" (number five) and "Pencil Full Of Lead" (number 17). In Scotland, "Candy" is Nutini's highest-charting single alongside "Last Request", topping the Scottish Singles Chart. Elsewhere, the song reached number 10 in Switzerland and the top 30 in Ireland and Italy.

== Charts ==
=== Weekly charts ===
Chart (2009)	Peak position
Belgium (Ultratip Bubbling Under Flanders)	18
Belgium (Ultratip Bubbling Under Wallonia)	16
Europe (European Hot 100 Singles)	51
Germany (GfK)	62
Ireland (IRMA)	25
Italy (FIMI)	20
Scottish Singles Sales (Official Charts)	1
Switzerland (Schweizer Hitparade)	10
UK Singles (Official Charts)	19
US Adult Alternative Airplay (Billboard)	29

=== Year-end charts ===
Chart (2009)	Position
Switzerland (Schweizer Hitparade)	79
UK Singles (OCC)	179

== Certifications ==
Region	Certification	Certified units/sales
Italy (FIMI)	Platinum	50,000^{‡}
New Zealand (RMNZ)	Gold	15,000^{‡}
Switzerland (IFPI Switzerland)	Gold	15,000^{^}
United Kingdom (BPI)	3× Platinum	1,800,000^{‡}
^{^} Shipments figures based on certification alone.^{‡} Sales+streaming figures based on certification alone.

== Covers ==
In 2010, the song was covered by Welsh act Marina and the Diamonds on Dermot O'Leary's show on BBC Radio 2. In 2014, Kungs & Jasmine Thompson collaborated to make a cover version of the song which uses the elements of Tropical house and Deep house. Previously, Thompson released a cover version of the song in February of that year.
