= Up All Night (Alex Clare song) =

Single by Alex Clare

from the album The Lateness of the Hour
- Released: 9 December 2010
- Recorded: 2010
- Genre: Electronic rock; alternative rock; drum and bass; blue-eyed soul
- Length: 2:43
- Label: Island
- Songwriter(s): Alex Clare; Diplo; Switch; Ariel Rechtshaid
- Producer(s): Major Lazer; Ariel Rechtshaid; Mike Spencer

Alex Clare singles chronology
"Up All Night" (2010)	"Too Close" (2011)

"Up All Night" is the debut single by English singer Alex Clare, released in December 2010. It is from his debut studio album The Lateness of the Hour. The song was written by Alex Clare and producers Diplo and Switch of Major Lazer and features addition production from Mike Spencer and co-writer Ariel Rechtshaid. It was first released on 9 December 2010 as a digital download in the United Kingdom. Remixes were later released digitally and physically on various vinyl formats. It has been used as the opening theme for the BBC science fiction show Class which is an official spin-off from Doctor Who.

== Music video ==
The music video was first published through Alex Clare's YouTube channel on 10 November 2010. It is around three minutes in length and it was directed by Blake Claridge.

The video starts with three different people, two men and a girl, who wake up lying on the ground, after having passed out the previous night. Throughout the video, the girl is seen near a swimming pool, one of the men is seen running on a treadmill, and the other is seen playing the drums to the song. The video progresses to show how the three characters' actions led them to the beginning of the video.

== Track listing ==
Digital download
No.	Title	Length
1.	"Up All Night"	2:42
2.	"Up All Night" (featuring Gilbere Forté)	3:22
3.	"Up All Night" (SBTRKT Remix)	3:20
4.	"Up All Night" (SBTRKT VIP Remix)	5:40

Remixes
No.	Title	Length
1.	"Up All Night" (Skream's Behind Closed Doors Remix)	5:40
2.	"Up All Night" (Nadastrom Remix)	4:44

== Charts ==
Chart (2013)	Peak position
US Alternative Airplay (Billboard)	32

== Credits and personnel ==
- Lead vocals – Alex Clare
- Songwriters – Alex Clare, Thomas Pentz, David Taylor, Ariel Rechtshaid
- Producers – Diplo, Switch
- Additional production – Ariel Rechtshaid, Mike Spencer
- Label: Island

== Release history ==
Region	Date	Format	Label
United Kingdom	9 December 2010 (EP)	Digital download	Island
United Kingdom	10 January 2011 (Single)	7"	Island
United Kingdom	10 January 2011 (SBTRKT Remixes)	10"	Island
United Kingdom	10 October 2011 (Remixes)	12"	Island
United Kingdom	16 September 2011 (Remixes)	Digital download	Island
