= Rewind (Paolo Nutini song) =

Single by Paolo Nutini

from the album These Streets
- Released: 4 December 2006
- Recorded: 2006
- Genre: Pop rock
- Length: 4:20 (album version); 3:56 (radio edit)
- Label: Atlantic
- Songwriters: Jim Duguid; Paolo Nutini

Paolo Nutini singles chronology
"Jenny Don't Be Hasty" (2006)	"Rewind" (2006)	"New Shoes" (2007)

"Rewind" is the third single from Scottish singer/songwriter Paolo Nutini, which was released on 4 December 2006. It was taken from his debut album, These Streets, and was the follow-up to his hits "Last Request" and "Jenny Don't Be Hasty". The single missed the top 20 but gave him his third consecutive top 30 hit single on the UK Singles Chart, peaking at number 27. On 1 June 2008, it returned to the UK Singles Chart at number 98.

The song was covered by fellow Scottish act The View on Radio 1's Live Lounge on 17 January 2007.

It has been used on the television series CSI: Miami, The Hills, and Eli Stone, and featured on the soundtrack to the film P.S. I Love You.

== Charts ==
Chart (2006)	Peak position
European Hot 100 Singles	83
UK Singles (OCC)	27

== Certifications ==
Region	Certification	Certified units/sales
United Kingdom (BPI)	Silver	200,000^{‡}
^{‡} Sales+streaming figures based on certification alone.
