= Too Close (Alex Clare song) =

2011 single by Alex Clare

Single by Alex Clare

from the album The Lateness of the Hour
- B-side: "Remixes"
- Released: 15 April 2011
- Recorded: 2010
- Genre: R&B; dubstep; alternative pop
- Length: 4:16 (album version); 3:43 (radio edit)
- Label: Island
- Songwriters: Alex Clare; Jim Duguid
- Producers: Ariel Rechtshaid; Mike Spencer; Major Lazer

Alex Clare singles chronology
| "Up All Night" (2010) | "Too Close" (2011) | "Treading Water" (2011) |

Music video
- "Too Close" on YouTube

"Too Close" is a song by British singer Alex Clare. The track was first released in the United Kingdom on 15 April 2011 as the second single from Clare's debut studio album, The Lateness of the Hour (2011). The track was written by Clare, Jim Duguid and produced by Major Lazer (Diplo and Switch), with co-production from Ariel Rechtshaid and Mike Spencer. Lyrically, the song describes the protagonist who is not ready for a committed relationship and he must end things with his love interest in good terms.

The song became popular after it was used in an advertising campaign for Microsoft's Internet Explorer 9. "Too Close" was a number-one hit in Germany and Luxembourg. It became a top-ten hit in multiple countries, including the UK, where it peaked at number 4, and the U.S., where it peaked at number 7. The song has also been certified double platinum by the RIAA. The song was also nominated for the Brit Award for Best British Single at the 2013 Brit Awards.

== Background ==
Clare said "Too Close" was inspired by a particular relationship with a close friend that turned romantic. He said, "One thing led to another, but it didn't really work out and that felt too close."

The song was first released in the UK on 15 April 2011 as the second single from the album. In March 2012, it was selected as the soundtrack to Microsoft's advertisement for Internet Explorer 9, released the following month. The exposure propelled the song to international success. This marked a turnaround in Clare's musical career and fortunes. Prior to it entering the UK Singles Chart, he had been forced to take a job as an estate agent after being dropped by his record label due to poor sales of his album. Soon after its success on the chart, Universal Republic Records signed Clare to a distribution deal that allowed The Lateness of the Hour to be released in the US. The song's success in the US also led to it being featured as one of the 16 main tracks on NOW That's What I Call Music! 43.

== Chart and sales performance ==
In the weeks after the premiere of the Microsoft advertising campaign where the song was featured, "Too Close" sold more than 100,000 digital downloads, and it made its debut at number 68 on the Billboard Hot 100 in its third week of release. It reached the top-ten in September after a boost in download due to it being featured in Fox TV's So You Think You Can Dance, with 127,000 downloads sold for the week. The song peaked at number 7 on the U.S. Billboard Hot 100. The song has sold over 3 million digital downloads in the US as of May 2013.

In the UK, the song sold 70,000 copies in the weeks after the Microsoft advertising campaign premiered. The song peaked at number four on the UK Singles Chart and at number-one in Germany and Luxembourg. It was the eighteenth best-selling single of 2012 in the UK with sales of 557,000.

== Music video ==
A music video to accompany the release of "Too Close" was first released onto YouTube on 15 March 2011 at a total length of four minutes and eighteen seconds. The video contains Clare singing on a chair, intermixed with scenes of a heavily dramaticised representation of a Kendo match between two heavily padded athletes in black uniforms. The fight takes place in an urban setting resembling a deserted factory building. Clare said that he originally wanted samurais cutting each other up in the music video but the budget did not permit it, so he had to settle for kendo fighters.

The video opened to very small numbers, but two months after the Internet Explorer 9 advert campaign, it gained much popularity and by 24 February 2013, it had more than 40 million views. It has over 88 million views as of November 2023.

An alternate music video was released to YouTube on 28 August 2012. There is also an official version of the music video with footage from Taken 2.

== Covers ==
In October 2012, Leona Lewis performed an acoustic cover of the song during a session with The Sun. Tim Halperin and Macy Maloy also covered the song.

== Track listing ==
Digital download
| No. | Title | Length |
|---|---|---|
| 1. | "Too Close" | 4:16 |
| 2. | "Too Close" (Nadastrom Remix) | 4:28 |
| 3. | "Too Close" (music video) | 4:18 |
| 4. | "Too Close" (Distance Remix) | 4:00 |

== Charts and certifications ==
=== Weekly charts ===
| Chart (2011–2012) | Peak position |
|---|---|
| Australia (ARIA) | 66 |
| Austria (Ö3 Austria Top 40) | 5 |
| Belgium (Ultratip Bubbling Under Flanders) | 15 |
| Belgium (Ultratop 50 Wallonia) | 36 |
| Canada Hot 100 (Billboard) | 14 |
| Canadian Alternative Rock (America's Music Charts) | 42 |
| CIS Airplay (TopHit) | 2 |
| Czech Republic Airplay (ČNS IFPI) | 19 |
| Denmark (Tracklisten) | 29 |
| France (SNEP) | 9 |
| Germany (GfK) | 1 |
| Hungary (Rádiós Top 40) | 14 |
| Ireland (IRMA) | 47 |
| Luxembourg Digital Songs (Billboard) | 1 |
| Netherlands (Dutch Top 40) | 37 |
| Netherlands (Single Top 100) | 33 |
| Russia Airplay (TopHit) | 1 |
| Scottish Singles Sales (Official Charts) | 6 |
| Switzerland (Schweizer Hitparade) | 12 |
| Ukraine Airplay (TopHit) | 127 |
| UK Singles (Official Charts) | 4 |
| US Billboard Hot 100 | 7 |
| US Adult Contemporary (Billboard) | 25 |
| US Adult Pop Airplay (Billboard) | 4 |
| US Dance Airplay (Billboard) | 7 |
| US Pop Airplay (Billboard) | 4 |
| US Rock & Alternative Airplay (Billboard) | 3 |
| US Hot Rock & Alternative Songs (Billboard) | 2 |
| US Rhythmic Airplay (Billboard) | 34 |
| Venezuela Airplay (Record Report) | 115 |

=== Year-end charts ===
| Chart (2012) | Position |
|---|---|
| Austria (Ö3 Austria Top 40) | 18 |
| France (SNEP) | 72 |
| Germany (Media Control Charts) | 11 |
| Russia Airplay (TopHit) | 167 |
| Switzerland (Schweizer Hitparade) | 31 |
| UK Singles (Official Charts Company) | 18 |
| US Billboard Hot 100 | 30 |
| US Adult Top 40 (Billboard) | 36 |
| US Dance/Mix Show Airplay (Billboard) | 46 |
| US Hot Rock Songs (Billboard) | 13 |
| US Mainstream Top 40 (Billboard) | 35 |

| Chart (2013) | Position |
|---|---|
| Russia Airplay (TopHit) | 15 |
| Ukraine Airplay (TopHit) | 137 |
| US Hot Rock Songs (Billboard) | 19 |

=== Certifications ===
| Region | Certification | Certified units/sales |
|---|---|---|
| Austria (IFPI Austria) | Gold | 15,000^{*} |
| Brazil (Pro-Música Brasil) | Gold | 30,000^{‡} |
| Germany (BVMI) | 3× Gold | 450,000^{‡} |
| Switzerland (IFPI Switzerland) | Platinum | 30,000^{^} |
| United Kingdom (BPI) | Platinum | 600,239 |
| United States (RIAA) | 2× Platinum | 3,000,000 |
Streaming
| Denmark (IFPI Danmark) | Gold | 900,000^{†} |
^{*} Sales figures based on certification alone.^{^} Shipments figures based on certification alone.^{‡} Sales+streaming figures based on certification alone.^{†} Streaming-only figures based on certification alone.

== Release history ==
| Region | Date | Format | Label |
|---|---|---|---|
| United Kingdom | 15 April 2011 | Digital download | Island |
| United States | 5 March 2012 | Digital download | Island |
| United States | 15 May 2012 | Mainstream airplay | Universal Republic |
