= Hey You (Madonna song) =

2007 single by Madonna

Single by Madonna
- Released: May 24, 2007
- Recorded: 2007
- Genre: Pop
- Length: 4:12
- Label: Warner Bros.
- Songwriter: Madonna
- Producers: Madonna; Pharrell Williams

Madonna singles chronology
| "Jump" (2006) | "Hey You" (2007) | "4 Minutes" (2008) |

Music video
- "Hey You" on YouTube

"Hey You" is a charity song written and recorded by American singer Madonna. She co-produced the song with Pharrell Williams for the Live Earth campaign. It was released digitally on May 24, 2007 and was available on the CD and DVD of the Live Earth concerts on December 4, 2007. Musically it is a stripped-down, folksy ballad with straightforward, anthem-like lyrics talking about how to save the world from destruction. The song received generally mixed reviews, with one group of reviewers commenting that the modest message of the song was uninspiring while others called the song sweet and commended Madonna's commitment to charity.

"Hey You" was initially released as a free download for a period of seven days before being made available as a regular digital single. Once it had been released as a regular digital single, it entered the lower reaches of the sales charts of a few countries including the United Kingdom, Canada, Sweden and Switzerland. Madonna only performed the song once at the Live Earth concert, London, where she was joined by a choir of school children who provided backing vocals to her singing while the backdrops displayed images relevant to the song's message, like natural devastations, different cultures and political leaders.

== Background ==
"Hey You" was written by Madonna, who also co-produced it along with Pharrell Williams in honor of the 2007 Live Earth concert in London. It was inspired by the climate change campaign. It became Madonna's first single since "Gambler" (1985) to be written entirely by herself. Live Earth was a music event that brought together more than hundred headlining artists in a series of concerts, two billion people and launched a mass movement to combat climate crisis. The concerts took place in cities like New York, London, Sydney, Tokyo, Shanghai, Rio de Janeiro etc. It marked the beginning of a multi-year campaign led by The Alliance for Climate Protection to move individuals, corporations and governments to take action. The song was made available to be downloaded in MP3 and WMA formats on MSN's Live Earth website. Microsoft pledged to donate $0.25 per download to the "Alliance for Global Climate Change" society for the first million downloads of the track. Live Earth founder Kevin Wall said in a statement, "We are thrilled that Madonna donated her art to Live Earth and is a part of this movement for us."

== Composition ==
'Hey You'
A 26 second sample from Madonna's song "Hey You" where Madonna sings the first verse.

"Hey You" is a stripped-down, straightforward mid-tempo pop ballad with influences of folk in it and features lyrics like "Hey you/ Don't you give up/ It's not so bad/ There's still a chance for us." The lyric conveys the message that purifying your own soul can open the way, by which one can change the mind of others. According to The New York Times, the lyrics have straightforward, anthem-like meaning with lines like "If you can change someone else/Then you have saved someone else/ But you must first love yourself." Daryl Davis from Blogcritics felt that "Hey You" is about making the world a better place. The song begins with the sound of acoustic guitars, leading to an instrumental chorus, which according to Davis, is "simple and touching".

== Critical reception ==
Sarah Hall from E! Online called the song to be unlikely inspiring to the listeners to hit the dance floor. Jon Pareles from The New York Times, while reviewing the Live Earth concert in London, said that the song and its lyrics like "Don’t you give up/it’s not so bad" are not exactly eloquent. While reviewing Madonna's album Hard Candy, he commented that "Hey You" failed to be the equivalent of Madonna's cover version of John Lennon's song "Imagine". He also noted that "[t]he song came and went, raising some corporate donations". Alessandra Stanley from The New York Times commented that the song had a modest message with lines like "Don't you give up/it's not so bad/there's still a chance for us."

Michael Hirschorn from The Atlantic Monthly said that the song was proof that Madonna's heart was in the right place. Responses from the Madonna fansites were also mixed with some fans decrying the track's message as overly sentimental and the lyrics as weak, while others defended the song as "sweet" and "not that bad," while commending the singer's commitment to charity. Daryl D from Blogcritics felt that "even if the lyrics are slightly clichéd, Madonna gives her best vocal performance since the Evita years and adds feeling when the lyrics falter.... The production on this record is outstanding. It also proves that Madonna brings more to the table on her own records than her critics give her credit for because this sounds absolutely nothing like a song Pharrell Williams would produce. The acoustic guitars at the beginning lead to an instrumental chorus that is simple and touching."

== Chart performance ==
"Hey You" was promoted through the official Live Earth website and the July 7, 2007 concert in London. There was no physical single released. However, it managed to chart in countries like Canada, Sweden and Switzerland in its second week of release based purely on paid downloads. In Canada the song entered for one week on the Canadian Hot 100 chart at position fifty-seven and was present for one week only. In Switzerland, it entered the chart at number 60, but fell down to number 91 the next week. The song started climbing up again and ultimately reached a peak of number 55 on the chart issue dated September 2, 2007. "Hey You" was present on the chart for a total of seven weeks. It debuted on the Swedish Singles Chart at number 58 and reached a peak of 57, being present on the chart for three weeks. The song was also able to chart at the lower positions of the UK Singles Chart, at number 187 based on downloads. In the Czech Republic, it reached the top ten and peaked at number nine on the airplay charts. "Hey You" also entered on the Digital charts of Italy, reaching a peak of number 36 in its fourth week. In the United States, the song sold 3,000 digital downloads after it was made purchasable-only on the iTunes Store. The song was not eligible to chart on Hot Digital Songs since free downloads are not applicable in the chart per Billboard and Nielsen SoundScan.

== Live performance ==
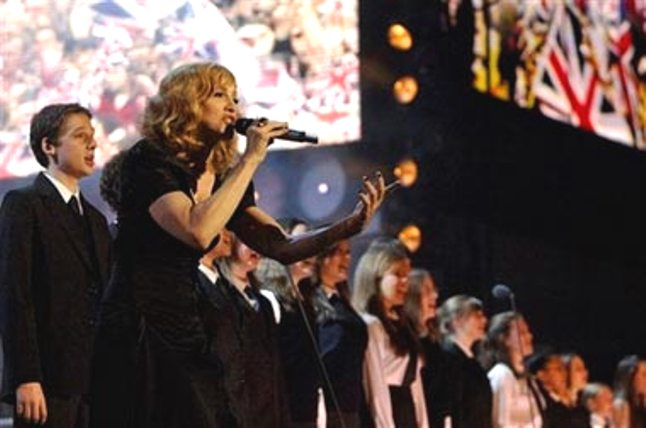
Madonna performing "Hey You" during the Live Earth concert on July 7, 2007. She is surrounded by a choir of children in school uniform.

On May 17, 2007, Warner Bros. Records announced Madonna as one of the seventeen headliners performing at Wembley Stadium for the London stop of the Live Earth concerts. It is still the only venue where Madonna has performed the song. Madonna's set list was the last performance of the London leg before the concert moved to New York City. "Hey You" was the first of the set list which consisted of a total of four songs. It was also used as the bridging music between the bands performing at Wembley. The performance started with the symbolic turning-off of lights of the stadium which plunged it into darkness except for the lights on the stage and that from the cameras. Actor Terence Stamp who compered the show, declared "Let’s not be endarkened by this, let's be enlightened by this. Let it be the beginning of an adventure!" Madonna came out on the stage wearing a black satin leotard accompanied by a long line of children in school uniform. The children were compared to the Hogwarts school choir from the Harry Potter series by The New York Times.

Madonna started singing the song while holding the amplifier in her hand. The backdrop imitated the song's message by displaying a procession of images of environmental devastations like fires, nuclear power plants, suffering animals—which altered with images of visionary leaders like Nelson Mandela, Aung San Suu Kyi, Mahatma Gandhi, and current political leaders like George W. Bush, Gordon Brown and Nicolas Sarkozy. The video progressed to display the image of underdressed but nonetheless festive African children tossing a globe into the air, where it resolved into an image of the Earth as seen from space. The idea of the video was to transpose the images of the world leaders with natural disasters. The lyrics of the song were also projected as supertitles. Backing vocals were provided by the children. The performance ended with Madonna and the kids coming in front of the stage and saluting the crowd.

== Credits and personnel ==
- Madonna – songwriter, producer
- Mirwais Ahmadzaï – guitar
- Pharrell Williams – producer, guitar, keyboards

== Charts ==
| Chart (2007) | Peak position |
|---|---|
| Canada Hot 100 (Billboard) | 57 |
| Croatia International Airplay (HRT) | 2 |
| Czech Republic Airplay (ČNS IFPI) | 9 |
| Italy (FIMI) | 36 |
| Sweden (Sverigetopplistan) | 57 |
| Switzerland (Schweizer Hitparade) | 55 |
| UK Singles (Official Charts Company) | 187 |
