= Treading Water (Alex Clare song) =

Single by Alex Clare

from the album The Lateness of the Hour
- Released: 27 May 2011
- Recorded: 2010
- Genre: Drum and bass; soul; alternative rock; dubstep
- Length: 3:38
- Label: Island
- Songwriter(s): Jarrad Rogers; Francis White; Alex Clare
- Producer(s): Mike Spencer

Alex Clare singles chronology
"Too Close" (2011)	"Treading Water" (2011)	"Not Giving In" (2012)

"Treading Water" is a song by British singer Alex Clare, from his debut studio album The Lateness of the Hour. It was released on 27 May 2011 as a digital download in the United Kingdom as the third single from the album. The song was written by Jarrad Rogers, Francis White, Alex Clare and produced by Mike Spencer. It has peaked to number 62 on the German Singles Chart.

== Music video ==
A music video to accompany the release of "Treading Water" was first released onto YouTube on 3 June 2011 at a total length of three minutes and forty-five seconds.

In the music video, We are set in a car park with Alex sitting inside a car with his girlfriend. However the girlfriend then leaves the car angry and walks off leaving Alex behind. In between shots we have Alex singing with the girlfriend crying. Into another verse the car slowly begins to fill with water as it then begins to pour in faster. It then goes into another mix shot between Alex and the girlfriend as the water rises in the car. At the end of the music video Alex is nearly submerged before he opens the car door letting out the water inside the car as the video fades out.

== Track listing ==
Digital download
No.	Title	Length
1.	"Treading Water"	3:38

Remix single
No.	Title	Length
1.	"Treading Water" (DC Breaks Remix)	4:09

Remixes
No.	Title	Length
1.	"Treading Water" (Radio Edit)	3:18
2.	"Treading Water" (Lenzman Remix)	5:12
3.	"Treading Water" (Noisses Remix)	5:30
4.	"Treading Water" (LBC Remix)	5:29

== Credits and personnel ==
- Lead vocals – Alex Clare
- Songwriters – Jarrad Rogers, Francis White, Alex Clare
- Producer – Mike Spencer
- Label: Island

== Chart performance ==
Chart (2012)	Peak position
Germany (GfK)	59
UK Singles (Official Charts Company)	179

== Release history ==
Region	Date	Format	Label
United Kingdom	27 May 2011	Digital download	Island
