= Alex Clare =

English singer-songwriter (born 1985)

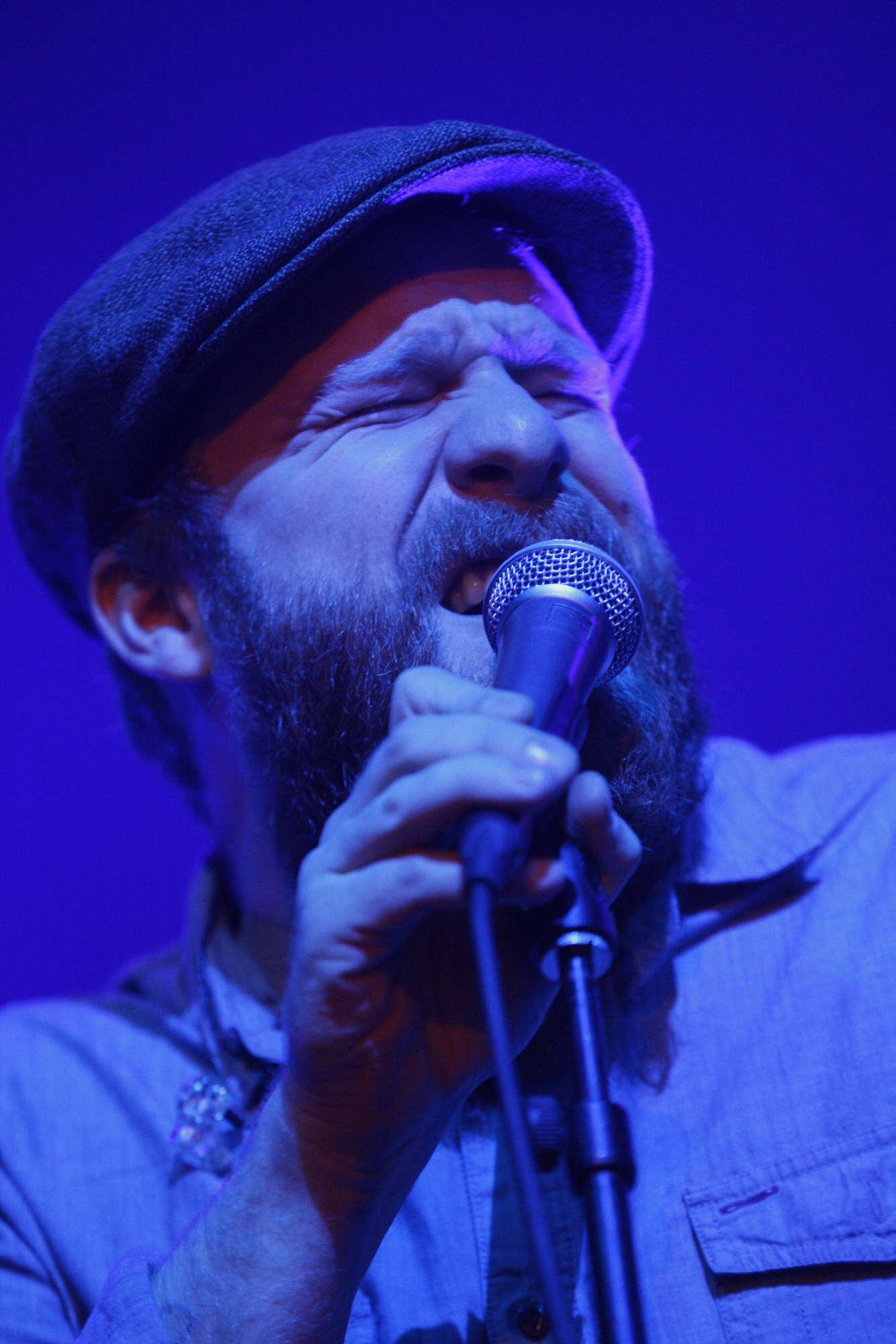
- Clare performing in 2013

Background information
- Born: Alexander George Clare; 14 September 1985 (age 41); London, England
- Genres: Alternative rock; electronica; pop; blue-eyed soul; drum and bass; R&B; dubstep; soul
- Occupations: Singer; songwriter
- Instrument: Vocals
- Years active: 2011–present
- Labels: Island; Republic; Universal Republic; ETC Recordings
- Website: alexclare.com

Alexander George Clare (born 14 September 1985) is an English singer and songwriter. His debut album, The Lateness of the Hour, produced by Mike Spencer and Major Lazer, was released in July 2011 on Island Records. He has since published four more albums, including an acoustic collection.

His biggest hit, "Too Close", peaked at number 4 on the UK Singles Chart and number 7 on the US Billboard Hot 100. The song was nominated for Best British Single at the 2013 Brit Awards.

== Early life ==
Alex Clare was born in London on 14 September 1985, the youngest of seven children. He grew up listening to his father's jazz records; Clare described the experience as a "...benefit of having a dad who was born in 1936... very much into bebop and cool jazz. I just loved it". From a young age, he was drawn to blues and soul artists such as Donny Hathaway and Stevie Wonder, which eventually led to interests in drum and bass, dubstep, and UK garage. Though he took up the trumpet and drums when he was young, he eventually placed an emphasis on guitar and songwriting, playing open mic nights with original material.

== Career ==
=== 2011–2012: Recording contract and The Lateness of the Hour ===
Clare's debut album, The Lateness of the Hour, produced by Mike Spencer and Major Lazer, was released in July 2011 on Island Records. It spawned the singles "Up All Night", "Too Close", "Treading Water", and "Hummingbird".

On 19 May 2011, Reggie Yates made Clare's cover of Prince's "When Doves Cry" his Song of the Day. A day later, the Dutch radio station 3FM announced "Too Close" to be the "Megahit" of the week.

In March 2012, "Too Close" was featured in several Internet Explorer 9 advertisements. Following its use, the song debuted at number 68 on the US Billboard Hot 100 and later reached number 7, becoming his first top 10 hit. "Too Close" peaked at number 4 on the UK Singles Chart in May 2012. In March, Island signed Clare to a distribution deal for The Lateness of the Hour to be released in the United States. Following disappointing sales and an inability to fulfill a support slot for Adele in 2012, Clare was dropped by the label.

In October 2014, ASCAP named Clare and Jim Duguid Songwriters of the Year for "Too Close".

=== 2014–2018: subsequent albums and hiatus ===
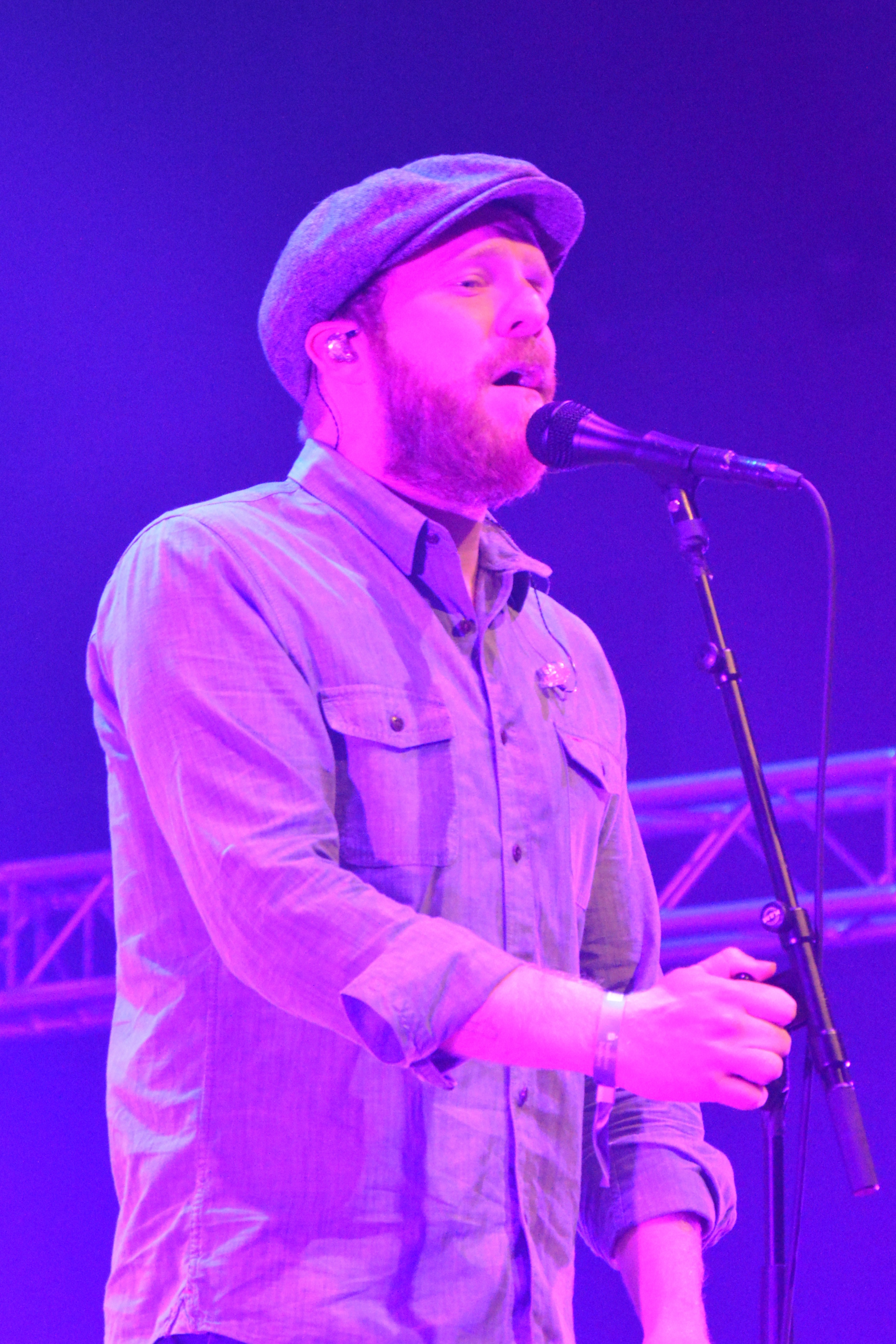
Clare performing in 2013

In May 2014, Clare released the video for his single "War Rages On", the first from his second album, Three Hearts, which came out in August.

Clare issued his third studio album, Tail of Lions, in November 2016.

In September 2018, he published an acoustic album titled Three Days at Greenmount, which includes stripped-back versions of previous songs as well as unreleased tracks, recorded during a three-day studio session in Leeds in 2017.

=== 2021–present: New single and Rebuild Again ===
In October 2021, Clare released the single "Why Don't Ya", following a five-year hiatus from the music industry. He also revealed that he had been working on new songs with the songwriter/producer Jamie Hartman during the COVID-19 lockdown.

In 2024, Clare published the explicitly Jewish-themed album Rebuild Again, a collaboration with the Jewish organization Thank You Hashem.

== Personal life ==
Brought up in what he has described as a "very, very secular Jewish" environment, Clare became a baal teshuva to the Chabad branch of Orthodox Judaism in the mid-2000s. As such, he does not perform, travel, or work on Shabbat or on Jewish holidays. Clare also keeps a strictly kosher diet and maintains a schedule of Talmud study on tour.

In 2006, before gaining critical success, Clare dated the British singer Amy Winehouse (with whom he shared a birthday) for approximately one year.

In 2015, he and his wife moved to Jerusalem. As of 2016, they had two children together.

== Discography ==
=== Studio albums ===
Title	Album details	Peak chart positions							Certifications
Title	Album details	UK	AUT	BEL	FRA	GER	SWI	US	Certifications
The Lateness of the Hour	Released: 8 July 2011 (UK); Label: Island; Formats: CD, digital download	17	16	190	95	8	49	48	BPI: Gold; BVMI: Gold
Three Hearts	Released: 11 August 2014 (UK); Label: Island; Formats: CD, digital download	98	—	—	—	43	74	—	
Tail of Lions	Released: 11 November 2016 (UK); 20 January 2017 (US); Label: ETC Recordings; Formats: CD, digital download	—	—	—	—	—	—	—	
Rebuild Again	Released: 13 November 2024; Label: Farbrengable Studios; Formats: CD, digital download	—	—	—	—	—	—	—	
"—" denotes a recording that did not chart or was not released in that territory.

=== Acoustic albums ===
Title	Album details
Three Days at Greenmount	Releases 14 September 2018; Label: ETC Recordings; Formats: CD, digital download

=== Singles ===
==== As lead artist ====
Title	Year	Peak chart positions										Certifications	Album
Title	Year	UK	AUT	BEL	CAN	DEN	FRA	GER	NL	SWI	US	Certifications	Album
"Up All Night"	2010	—	—	—	—	—	—	—	—	—	—		The Lateness of the Hour
"Too Close"	2011	4	5	36	14	29	9	1	33	12	7	BPI: Platinum; BVMI: 3× Gold; IFPI AUT: Gold; IFPI DEN: Gold; IFPI SWI: Gold; RIAA: 2× Platinum	The Lateness of the Hour
"Treading Water"	2011	179	—	—	—	—	—	59	—	—	—		The Lateness of the Hour
"Hummingbird"	2012	—	—	—	—	—	—	—	—	—	—		The Lateness of the Hour
"War Rages On"	2014	53	—	—	—	—	—	—	—	—	—		Three Hearts
"Never Let You Go"	2014	—	—	—	—	—	—	—	—	—	—		Three Hearts
"Tell Me What You Need"	2016	—	—	—	—	—	—	—	—	—	—		Tail of Lions
"Get Real"	2017	—	—	—	—	—	—	—	—	—	—		Tail of Lions
"Why Don't Ya"	2021	—	—	—	—	—	—	—	—	—	—		Non-album single
"—" denotes a recording that did not chart or was not released in that territory.

==== As featured artist ====
Title	Year	Peak chart positions						Certifications	Album
Title	Year	UK	AUS	BEL (FLA)	BEL (WA)	NL	NZ	Certifications	Album
"Not Giving In" (Rudimental featuring John Newman and Alex Clare)	2012	14	12	54	77	71	11	BPI: Gold; ARIA: 2× Platinum; RMNZ: 2× Platinum	Home
"Endorphins" (Sub Focus featuring Alex Clare)	2013	10	—	134	—	—	—	BPI: Silver; RMNZ: Gold	Torus
"Give It All" (Don Diablo featuring Alex Clare and Kelis)	2013	—	—	—	—	—	—		Non-album singles
"Living" (Bakermat featuring Alex Clare)	2016	—	—	—	—	—	—		Non-album singles
"Heaven to Me" (Don Diablo featuring Alex Clare)	2018	—	—	—	—	—	—		Non-album singles
"Hold On" (Ilan Bluestone and Maor Levi featuring Alex Clare)	2021	—	—	—	—	—	—		Non-album singles
"Thunder Child" (Jeff Wayne featuring Liam Neeson and Alex Clare)	2012	57	—	—	—	—	—		Jeff Wayne's Musical Version of The War of the Worlds – The New Generation
"—" denotes a recording that did not chart or was not released.

==== Other appearances ====
Title	Year	Album
"Give You Up" (Rudimental featuring Alex Clare)	2012	Home (deluxe version)
"Shine a Little Light" (Shine a Little Light featuring Alex Clare)	2016	Shine a Little Light (single)

=== Music videos ===
==== As lead artist ====
Title	Year	Director(s)
"Up All Night"	2010	Blake Claridge
"Too Close"	2011	Ian Bonhote
"Treading Water"	2011	Sam Pilling
"War Rages On"	2014	Alex Southam
"Get Real"	2017	Shimmy Socol
"Why Don't Ya"	2021	Indy Hait

==== As featured artist ====
Title	Year	Director(s)
"Not Giving In" (Rudimental featuring John Newman and Alex Clare)	2012	Josh Cole

== Awards and nominations ==
Year	Organisation	Award	Work	Result
2011	MOBO Awards	Best Newcomer	Himself	Nominated
2011	UK Music Video Awards	Best Pop Video – Budget	"Relax My Beloved"	Nominated
2013	UK Music Video Awards	Best Dance Video – UK	"Not Giving In" (Rudimental featuring John Newman and Alex Clare)	Won
2013	International Dance Music Awards	Best Breakthrough Artist (Solo)	Himself	Nominated
2013	New Music Awards	New AC Artist of the Year	Himself	Won
2013	Echo Music Prize	Best International Newcomer	Himself	Nominated
2013	BRIT Awards	British Single of the Year	"Too Close"	Nominated
2014	ASCAP Awards Night	Songwriter of the Year (with Jim Duguid)	"Too Close"	Won
2014	World Music Awards	World's Best Video	"Too Close"	Nominated
2014	World Music Awards	World's Best Male Artist	Himself	Nominated
2014	World Music Awards	World's Best Live Act	Himself	Nominated
2014	World Music Awards	World's Best Entertainer of the Year	Himself	Nominated
