= 10/10 (Paolo Nutini song) =

Single by Paolo Nutini

from the album Sunny Side Up
- B-side: "Tricks of the Trade" (live)
- Released: 11 January 2010
- Recorded: 2009
- Length: 2:56
- Label: Atlantic
- Songwriter: Paolo Nutini
- Producers: Paolo Nutini, Ethan Johns

Paolo Nutini singles chronology
"Pencil Full of Lead" (2009)	"10/10" (2010)	"Scream (Funk My Life Up)" (2014)

"10/10" (pronounced: Ten out of Ten) is a song by Scottish singer-songwriter Paolo Nutini, from his second studio album, Sunny Side Up. The song was released on 11 January 2010 as the fourth single from the album. The B-side of the single is a live version of album track "Tricks of the Trade", recorded in New Orleans in 2009. It features Nutini backed by the New Orleans Preservation Hall Jazz Band.

== Background ==
"10/10" is the first track on Nutini's second album Sunny Side Up. The song was written and produced by Nutini with additional production by Ethan Johns.

== Promotion ==
Before the song's digital single release, "10/10" was playlisted on the A-list of both BBC Radio 1 and BBC Radio 2. Nutini also promoted the song by performing it on Later... with Jools Holland in 2009 and on Jools Holland's Hootenanny on the 2009/2010 edition of the show.

== Critical reception ==
The BBC stated:

"This sounds like an old ska tune by Prince Buster. I think it's good fun, but I would probably not miss it if it mysteriously fell off the album and something else which sounds like Prince Buster popped up instead. 3/5".

Whereas The Skinny commented:

"Paolo Nutini seems to be suffering from an identity crisis. Having toyed with the idea of becoming Cat Stevens, he’s now decided he’s a seasoned reggae virtuoso. The thing is, on the entertaining 10/10, he’s pretty convincing. Whatever next, Paolo? A hair metal number? 3/5.".

== Chart performance ==
Following increasing amounts of radio airplay through January 2010, "10/10" entered the UK Singles Chart on the week ending 23 January 2010 at number 100. The following week the single jumped to #64, eventually peaking at #51. The song spent a total of six weeks inside the UK top 75.

== Music video ==
The video for "10/10" was released on 1 February 2010, three weeks after the song's single release. It features behind the scenes footage of Nutini from throughout the Sunny Side Up era, interspersed with live performances of the song.

== Track listing ==
Digital download
No.	Title	Length
1.	"10/10" (album version)	2:56
2.	"Tricks of the Trade" (Live from New Orleans)	1:57

== Charts ==
Chart (2010)	Peak position
Scottish Singles Sales (Official Charts)	37
UK Singles (Official Charts)	51

== Certifications ==
Region	Certification	Certified units/sales
United Kingdom (BPI)	Gold	400,000^{‡}
^{‡} Sales+streaming figures based on certification alone.
