= New Shoes =

2007 single by Paolo Nutini

Single by Paolo Nutini

from the album These Streets
- Released: 12 March 2007
- Length: 3:21
- Label: Atlantic
- Songwriters: Paolo Nutini, Matty Benbrook, Jim Duguid
- Producer: Ewan Stennett

Paolo Nutini singles chronology
"Rewind" (2006)	"New Shoes" (2007)	"Candy" (2009)

"New Shoes" is a song by Scottish singer-songwriter Paolo Nutini, released as the fourth single from debut album, These Streets. It was used as the headlining single for the US release of the album. The song peaked at number 21 on the UK Singles Chart, number eight on the US Billboard Bubbling Under Hot 100 chart, and number one on the Billboard Triple A chart. The song was used for a 2007 international ad campaign by Puma AG.

== Charts ==
=== Weekly charts ===
Chart (2007)	Peak position
Germany (GfK)	97
Ireland (IRMA)	35
Italy (FIMI)	24
Netherlands (Single Top 100)	42
Switzerland (Schweizer Hitparade)	52
UK Singles (OCC)	21
US Bubbling Under Hot 100 (Billboard)	8
US Triple A (Billboard)	1

=== Year-end charts ===
Chart (2007)	Position
UK Singles (OCC)	98

== Certifications ==
Region	Certification	Certified units/sales
Italy (FIMI)	Gold	25,000^{‡}
New Zealand (RMNZ)	Platinum	30,000^{‡}
United Kingdom (BPI)	2× Platinum	1,200,000^{‡}
^{‡} Sales+streaming figures based on certification alone.

== Cover versions ==
Lena Meyer-Landrut covered this song on some editions of her album My Cassette Player. A live version is found on the platinum edition of her album Good News and on her DVD "Good News Live".
