= Last Night in the Bittersweet =

Studio album by Paolo Nutini
- Released: 1 July 2022
- Length: 72:07
- Label: Atlantic
- Producer: Paolo Nutini; Gavin Fitzjohn; Dani Castelar

Paolo Nutini chronology
Caustic Love (2014)	Last Night in the Bittersweet (2022)

Singles from Last Night in the Bittersweet
- 1. "Through the Echoes" Released: 11 May 2022; 2. "Lose It" Released: 11 May 2022; 3. "Shine a Light" Released: 1 June 2022; 4. "Acid Eyes" Released: 22 June 2022; 5. "Petrified in Love" Released: 22 June 2022

Last Night in the Bittersweet is the fourth studio album by Scottish singer-songwriter Paolo Nutini, released on 1 July 2022 by Atlantic Records. Two songs from the album, "Through the Echoes" and "Lose It", were jointly released on 11 May 2022. Last Night in the Bittersweet was Nutini's first release in eight years, following his third studio album, Caustic Love (2014).

== Critical reception ==
Professional ratings
Aggregate scores
Source	Rating
Metacritic	87/100
Review scores
Source	Rating
AllMusic	4.5/5 stars
The Arts Desk	4/5 stars
Clash	8/10
Evening Standard	4/5 stars
The Irish Times	4/5 stars
The Skinny	4/5 stars
The Times	4/5 stars

Last Night in Bittersweet received a score of 87 out of 100 on review aggregator Metacritic from four critics' reviews, indicating "universal acclaim". Writing in Mojo, John Aizelwood gave this release 4 out of 5 stars, calling it "worth wallowing in".

== Commercial performance ==
The album debuted at number one on the UK Albums Chart dated 8 July 2022, and by midweek, was outselling the album at number two by a ratio of 4:1. It was Nutini's third consecutive UK number-one album.

== Track listing ==
Last Night in the Bittersweet track listing
No.	Title	Writer(s)	Length
1.	"Afterneath"	Paolo Nutini; Gavin Fitzjohn; John Blease; Quentin Tarantino	4:05
2.	"Radio"	Nutini; Matty Benbrook	4:22
3.	"Through the Echoes"	Nutini	3:41
4.	"Acid Eyes"	Nutini; Dani Castelar	4:33
5.	"Stranded Words" (interlude)	Nutini; Tom Herbert	2:31
6.	"Lose It"	Nutini; Gavin Fitzjohn	5:30
7.	"Petrified in Love"	Nutini; Fitzjohn	3:53
8.	"Everywhere"	Nutini	5:51
9.	"Abigail"	Nutini	3:50
10.	"Children of the Stars"	Nutini	3:20
11.	"Heart Filled Up"	Nutini	5:17
12.	"Shine a Light"	Nutini; Thomas Seamus Simon	5:56
13.	"Desperation"	Nutini	3:35
14.	"Julianne"	Nutini	4:51
15.	"Take Me Take Mine"	Nutini	6:51
16.	"Writer"	Nutini	4:01
Total length:			72:07

== Personnel ==
Musicians

- Paolo Nutini – vocals (all tracks), bass guitar (3, 4, 6, 7, 12), acoustic guitar (3, 9, 11–13, 15), piano (3), synthesizer (4, 6, 8, 12, 15), organ (9), electric guitar (10)
- Gavin Fitzjohn – electric guitar (1, 3, 4, 6–15), bass guitar (1); flugelhorn, saxophone (2); organ (3, 7, 8), acoustic guitar (4, 10, 15), programming (6), percussion (8, 10), piano (11, 15), synthesizer (12, 13)
- John Blease – drums (1, 3, 4, 7, 8, 10–12, 14, 15), percussion (8, 10)
- Jordi Fuster – electric guitar (1, 4, 7, 8, 10–12), acoustic guitar (12)
- Dani Castelar – programming (1, 3–15), skit (2), electric guitar (4), synthesizer (6)
- Donato di Trapani – synthesizer (1, 11, 12, 14), Hammond organ (10), piano (14)
- Dave Nelson – acoustic guitar, electric guitar (2)
- Matty Benbrook – drums, synthesizer (2)
- Pat Noodle – Mellotron (3)
- Tom Herbert – bass guitar (4, 5, 7–9, 11, 12, 15)
- Damon Reece – drums (6)
- Gerard Ballester – drums (8)
- Tom Pinder – trombone (8)
- Michael Mcdaid – acoustic guitar (9); backing vocals, bass guitar (10); electric guitar (14)
- Joe Glossop – Hammond organ (10), organ (15)
- Daniel Forouhar – twelve-string guitar, bass guitar, electric guitar (13)
- Scott Anderson – drums (13)
- Peter Riley – electric guitar (13)
- The Frying Salsiccia Brothers – backing vocals (14)
- Rob Moose – strings (14)

Technical

- Paolo Nutini – production
- Dani Castelar – production (all tracks), mixing (3, 5, 11, 12), engineering (1–15)
- Gavin Fitzjohn – production (all tracks), engineering (3, 4, 8)
- Matt Colton – mastering
- Paul Savage – mixing (1, 2, 6–10, 13)
- Richard Woodcraft – mixing (4, 14–16), engineering (3–5, 7, 9, 12, 15, 16), additional production (12, 15, 16)
- Joe Jones – engineering (1, 10), engineering assistance (7)
- Rhys Evans – engineering (4)
- Kevin Burleigh – engineering (13)

Artwork

- Alex Cowper – design
- David Sanden – design
- Reuben Sutherland – design
- Shamil Tanna – photography
- Paolo Nutini – cover art concept, back cover photo

== Charts ==
=== Weekly charts ===
Weekly chart performance for Last Night in the Bittersweet
Chart (2022–2025)	Peak position
Australian Digital Albums (ARIA)	9
Australian Physical Albums (ARIA)	34
Austrian Albums (Ö3 Austria)	13
Belgian Albums (Ultratop Flanders)	5
Belgian Albums (Ultratop Wallonia)	33
Dutch Albums (Album Top 100)	1
German Albums (Offizielle Top 100)	13
Greek Albums (IFPI)	45
Hungarian Albums (MAHASZ)	8
Irish Albums (OCC)	1
Italian Albums (FIMI)	17
Scottish Albums (OCC)	1
Swiss Albums (Schweizer Hitparade)	3
UK Albums (OCC)	1

=== Year-end charts ===
Year-end chart performance for Last Night in the Bittersweet
Chart (2022)	Position
UK Albums (OCC)	66

== Certifications ==
Region	Certification	Certified units/sales
United Kingdom (BPI)	Gold	100,000^{‡}
^{‡} Sales+streaming figures based on certification alone.
