= The Lateness of the Hour (Alex Clare album) =

Studio album by Alex Clare
- Released: 8 July 2011
- Recorded: 2010
- Genre: Soul; alternative rock; dubstep; drum and bass; electronica; electronic rock
- Length: 46:20
- Label: Island
- Producer: Mike Spencer; Major Lazer

Alex Clare chronology
The Lateness of the Hour (2011)	Three Hearts (2014)

Singles from The Lateness of the Hour
- 1. "Up All Night" Released: 9 December 2010; 2. "Too Close" Released: 15 April 2011; 3. "Treading Water" Released: 27 May 2011; 4. "Hummingbird" Released: 14 December 2012

The Lateness of the Hour is the debut studio album by British singer Alex Clare. It was released on 8 July 2011 by Island Records. The album peaked at number 17 on the UK Albums Chart, number 8 on the German Albums Chart and number 48 on the US Billboard 200. The album includes the singles "Up All Night", "Too Close" and "Treading Water".

== Background ==
All the songs on the album apart from a cover of Prince's "When Doves Cry" were co-written by Alex Clare. Most of these songs were about his personal relationships. According to Clare, they came from "a combination of lots of different situations I’ve been in with unrequited love or love that's gone terribly wrong." "Too Close" for example was inspired by a particular relationship with a close friend that turned romantic but "didn't really work out and that felt too close." Other album tracks like "Whispering" and "Tight Rope" were inspired by his childhood surroundings as well as his love for literature.

The album was released in the UK in 2011, but sold poorly initially and Clare was effectively dropped from his label. A month after he was dropped, he was contacted for permission to use a song from the album, "Too Close", in an advertising campaign for Microsoft's Internet Explorer 9. The advertising campaign propelled the song up the chart, and soon after, Universal Republic Records signed Clare to a distribution deal that allowed The Lateness of the Hour to be rush-released in America on iTunes on 24 March 2012.

== Recording ==
After Alex Clare signed with Island Records, he teamed up with Diplo and Switch (Major Lazer) in 2010 to collaborate on his debut album. The recording of the album took about 10 weeks in total, working around the Diplo's tour schedule. It was first recorded in New Orleans, then later in the year in Jamaica and eventually five weeks in Los Angeles.

Clare wrote the album, and had a handful of songs including "Too Close" already in demo form before hitting the studio. Clare described the experience of recording with Diplo and Switch "intense" but ultimately rewarding. According to Clare, Diplo and Switch "wanted to focus more on live instruments which was something I don't think they're used to," and "It was a challenge for them, a challenge for me and good things came out of it. We clicked very quickly."

== Singles ==
- "Up All Night" was released as the album's lead single on 9 December 2010.
- "Too Close" was released as the album's second single on 15 April 2011 in the UK. In March 2012, the track was selected as the soundtrack to Microsoft's advertisement for Internet Explorer 9, and the single was released in the US. The feature saw the track achieve international success, peaking at number four on the UK singles chart and number seven on the Billboard Hot 100.
- "Treading Water" was released as the album's third single in UK on 27 May 2011.
- "Hummingbird" was released as the album's fourth single on 14 December 2012.

== Reception ==
=== Critical reception ===
Professional ratings
Aggregate scores
Source	Rating
Metacritic	58/100
Review scores
Source	Rating
AllMusic (Jon O'Brien)	3/5 stars
Drowned in Sound (Robert Leedham)	(4/10)
The Independent (Andy Gill )	4/5 stars
Mojo	4/5 stars
musicOMH (Ben Hogwood)	3/5 stars
Pitchfork (Ian Cohen)	(3.7/10)
Uncut	2/5 stars

The album got mixed impressions via Metacritic, which it received a 58 out of a possible 100 points. The Lateness of the Hour got a few favourable ratings from the critics, and those come from Mojo, who gave the album a four-out-of-a-possible-five-stars. They called the album "A majorly impressive debut." Furthermore, the other one came from The Independent, who gave the album a four-out-of-a-possible-five-stars, and Andy Gill said the album was "An impressive debut, albeit one light on lyrical depth."

The mixed reviews came in from AllMusic, who gave the album a three-out-of-a-possible-five-stars, and Jon O'Brien wrote that the album "appears to be more concerned with creating a bold statement of intent than in showcasing Clare's undeniable talents." In addition, Drowned in Sound gave it a mixed impression review with a four-out-of-a-possible-ten, when Robert Leedham stated "Alex Clare is a fairly gifted gentleman. But here his talents have been squandered on a collection of songs that fail to establish him as either a dance-pop titan or an emotive warbler. It is [...] a shame that anyone thought dubstep, or several of the genre's hallmarks, could be so crudely co-opted into an obviously unwieldy vehicle." To this, Uncut gave the album a two-out-of-a-possible-five-stars, and they noted "Much of it is a coffee-table approximation of the producer duo's more irreverent work." On a more upbeat note, musicOMH gave the album a three-out-of-a-possible-five-stars because as Ben Hogwood noted "Is it dubstep? In parts. Is it soulful? When it wants to be. But perhaps the most crucial question is whether it shows potential or not – and happily for Clare the answer is affirmative. With a little more focus and a natural approach, he could find himself a unique voice that sits outside of the styles he is trying to embrace."

The lone highly negative review came in from Pitchfork, who gave the album a 3.7-out-of-a-possible-ten points, and Ian Cohen wrote that "...Lateness never does much to prove Clare and his producers were on the same page (let alone reading from the same book)...Truth is, it's much easier getting mad at the marketing plan of Lateness of the Hour than the record itself: The total mismatch of artistic motivation makes everyone involved come off like innocent bystanders, not manipulators."

=== Chart and sales performance ===
The album performed poorly when it was first released in the UK where it debuted at number 156 in the chart. After the launch of the advert for Microsoft's Internet Explorer 9 where the song "Too Close" was used, it sold 10 times better than they imagined it to sell. It peaked at number 17 in the UK chart.

The album entered the Billboard 200 at number 123 with sales of 4,000 after its rush-release on iTunes on 24 March 2012. It peaked at number 48.

== Track listing ==
Standard edition
No.	Title	Writer(s)	Length
1.	"Up All Night"	Ariel Rechtshaid; Thomas Pentz; Alex Clare; David Taylor	2:43
2.	"Treading Water"	Jarrad Rogers; Francis "Eg" White; Clare	3:38
3.	"Relax My Beloved"	Clare; Pentz; Rechtshaid; Taylor	3:31
4.	"Too Close"	Clare; Jim Duguid	4:17
5.	"When Doves Cry"	Prince	4:07
6.	"Hummingbird"	Rechtshaid; Pentz; Clare; Taylor; Antony Genn; Martin Slattery	3:50
7.	"Hands Are Clever"	Clare; White	3:16
8.	"Tightrope"	Rechtshaid; Pentz; Clare; Taylor; Genn; Slattery	3:37
9.	"Whispering"	Clare; James Lee Homes; Robert Terry Homes	4:30
10.	"Love You"	Iyiola Babatunde Babalola; Clare; Darren Emilio Lewis	4:39
11.	"Sanctuary"	Clare; Rogers; Genn; Slattery	4:00
12.	"I Won't Let You Down"		4:09

iTunes Deluxe Edition
No.	Title	Length
13.	"Damn Your Eyes" (Etta James cover)	2:26
14.	"Caroline"	5:04
15.	"Where Is The Heart?"	3:26
16.	"Too Close" (Nadastrom Remix)	4:28
17.	"Too Close" (Distance Remix)	4:00
18.	"Treading Water" (Unplugged)	3:42

AmazonMP3 Deluxe Edition
No.	Title	Length
13.	"Damn Your Eyes" (Etta James cover)	2:26
14.	"Caroline"	5:04
15.	"Too Close" (Nadastrom Remix)	4:28
16.	"Too Close" (Distance Remix)	4:00
17.	"Too Close" (Music video)	4:30

== Charts ==
=== Weekly charts ===
Chart (2012)	Peak position
Austrian Albums (Ö3 Austria)	16
Belgian Albums (Ultratop Wallonia)	190
German Albums (Offizielle Top 100)	8
Scottish Albums (OCC)	35
Swiss Albums (Schweizer Hitparade)	49
UK Albums (OCC)	17
US Billboard 200	48
US Heatseekers Albums (Billboard)	1

=== Year-end charts ===
Chart (2012)	Position
German Albums (Offizielle Top 100)	62
UK Albums (OCC)	146

== Release history ==
Country	Release date	Format	Label
United Kingdom	8 July 2011	Digital download	Island
United Kingdom	11 July 2011	CD	Island
United States	24 March 2012	Digital download	Island
United States	8 May 2012	CD	Island
