= Scream (Funk My Life Up) =

2014 single by Paolo Nutini

Single by Paolo Nutini

from the album Caustic Love
- Released: 28 January 2014
- Recorded: 2013
- Genre: Soul, funk rock, alternative rock
- Length: 3:09
- Label: Atlantic
- Songwriter: Paolo Nutini

Paolo Nutini singles chronology
"10/10" (2010)	"Scream (Funk My Life Up)" (2014)	"Let Me Down Easy" (2014)

"Scream (Funk My Life Up)" is a song by British pop/rock singer Paolo Nutini. The song was released as the lead single from his third studio album, Caustic Love. It was released in the United Kingdom on 28 January 2014 as a digital download, through Warner Music Group. The song peaked at number 12 on the UK Singles Chart and number 5 in Scotland. The song has also charted in Belgium, New Zealand and Switzerland.

== Music video ==
A music video to accompany the release of "Scream (Funk My Life Up)" was first released onto YouTube on 10 March 2014 at a total length of three minutes and nineteen seconds. The video was directed by Nez.

== Track listing ==
Digital download
No.	Title	Writer(s)	Length
1.	"Scream (Funk My Life Up)"	Paolo Nutini	3:09

== Charts ==
Chart (2014)	Peak position
Belgium (Ultratip Bubbling Under Flanders)	19
Belgium (Ultratip Bubbling Under Wallonia)	37
Ireland (IRMA)	22
New Zealand (Recorded Music NZ)	19
Scotland Singles (OCC)	5
Switzerland (Schweizer Hitparade)	56
UK Singles (OCC)	12

== Certifications ==
Region	Certification	Certified units/sales
United Kingdom (BPI)	Gold	400,000^{‡}
^{‡} Sales+streaming figures based on certification alone.

== Release history ==
Region	Date	Format	Label
United Kingdom	28 January 2014	Digital download	Warner Music Group
