= Speedway (band) =

Scottish band

- Origin: Glasgow, Scotland
- Genres: Soft rock, pop rock, rock
- Years active: 2001–2004
- Labels: Innocent Records
- Past members: Jill Jackson; Jim Duguid; Tom Swann; Dan Sells

Speedway were a Scottish pop rock group, who were formed in 2001, by Glaswegians Jill Jackson (lead vocals) and Jim Duguid (drums). The band acquired three more members in that year, with bass guitarist Tom Swann from Droitwich plus guitarist Dan Sells, now lead singer of The Feeling (the latter of whom was later replaced by Chris Leonard), and signed with Innocent Records in 2002. Also recruited as a guitarist was Carlos Garcia of The Crave.

The band supported then labelmates Blue on their UK tour in early 2003, played a number of university gigs, and played to over 25,000 people in September 2003 at the KC Stadium in Hull as part of a charity event made by the local radio station, Viking FM. A mashup by The Freelance Hellraiser of the Christina Aguilera hit "Genie in a Bottle" and "Hard to Explain" by the Strokes had been a popular online and radio hit, but was refused commercial release by the record label. Seizing on this, Speedway covered the Aguilera song to sound as close to the mashup as possible, and as a result it became their first single as a double A-side, with another song, "Save Yourself" and reached No. 10 on the UK Singles Chart.

Their second single, "Can't Turn Back" reached No. 12 in February 2004. Their third single, "In & Out", hit No. 33 in June, and their album, Save Yourself was released just after "Can't Turn Back" was released. The album reached No. 42 on the UK Albums Chart. Speedway thus left Innocent Records after their first UK tour, and later split up, later reforming briefly to support Bryan Adams on his ten date UK tour later that year.

Jackson later toured the material for an acoustic solo album in support of Nashville, Tennessee singer-songwriter Kevin Montgomery, formed a duo with Irish singer-songwriter Gianna Cassidy called Jackson and Cassidy, and released her first solo album in 2006. Jackson then worked with her own band; members include Alan Frew (guitar), Carl Taylor (drums) and Lorna Thomas (bass).

Duguid was until recently drumming and writing for Scottish singer-songwriter Paolo Nutini (who supported Speedway at some of their later gigs in 2004) and can be seen in the videos to Nutini's singles.

== Discography ==
=== Albums ===
- Save Yourself (2003) - UK No. 42

=== Singles ===
- "Genie in a Bottle/Save Yourself" – UK No. 10
- "Can't Turn Back" – UK No. 12
- "In and Out" – UK No. 31
- "Around Back"

== Band members ==
=== Final line up ===
- Jill Jackson – Lead Vocals, Rhythm Guitar
- Dan Gillespie Sells – Lead Guitar
- Tom Swann – Bass Guitar
- Jim Duguid – Drums

=== Other members ===
- Chris Leonard – Lead Guitar
- Tom Lamb – Hi-hat
- Carlos Garcia – Guitar
- Noel Nugent – Bass Guitar
