= Iron Sky (song) =

Single by Paolo Nutini

from the album Caustic Love
- Released: 14 August 2014
- Recorded: 2014
- Genre: Soul
- Length: 6:13
- Label: Atlantic
- Songwriters: Paolo Nutini, Dave Nelson

Paolo Nutini singles chronology
"Let Me Down Easy" (2014)	"Iron Sky" (2014)	"One Day" (2014)

"Iron Sky" is a rock song by Scottish singer/songwriter Paolo Nutini from his third studio album Caustic Love, which was released in April 2014. The song was released as a single on Atlantic Records in August 2014. The song was a minor hit in the UK charts in the spring of 2014, reaching number 42 in April of that year, ahead of its official single release.

The song was described as being a "slow burner." The Independent described it as being a "stirring blend of conscious-soul subject with deep-soul style" and compared the song to being, "like Percy Sledge singing Curtis Mayfield.". The song features an audio excerpt of the famous speech Charlie Chaplin gave in his film The Great Dictator (1940).

Initially a non-charting single in the Netherlands, the song was revived by Dutch radio station 3FM in early 2015 following the Charlie Hebdo shooting in Paris on 7 January 2015. Radio DJ Giel Beelen cried while reading the lyrics on air.

The song is also sampled in Bon Iver's song "33 'GOD"" from their 2016 album 22, A Million.

== Music video ==
The music video was filmed in Kyiv, Ukraine by Daniel Wolfe. It won the best music video award at the 2015 SXSW Film Festival.

== Charts ==
Chart (2014–15)	Peak position
Belgium (Ultratip Bubbling Under Flanders)	7
Ireland (IRMA)	96
Italy (FIMI)	71
Netherlands (Dutch Top 40)	30
Netherlands (Single Top 100)	24
UK Singles (OCC)	42

== Certifications ==
Region	Certification	Certified units/sales
Italy (FIMI)	Gold	25,000^{‡}
United Kingdom (BPI)	Platinum	600,000^{‡}
^{‡} Sales+streaming figures based on certification alone.
