= Save Yourself (Speedway album) =

Studio album by Speedway
- Released: 8 March 2004
- Recorded: Innocent Records
- Genre: Pop rock
- Producer: Ash Howes, Martin Harrington, StarGate, Guy Chambers

Save Yourself is the debut album by Scottish pop rock band Speedway. It reached No. 42 on the UK Albums Chart.

== Track listing ==
No.	Title	Writer(s)	Length
1.	"Juggernaut"	G. Chambers, Jackson, Duguid	3:36
2.	"In & Out"	G. Chambers, Jackson, Duguid	3:23
3.	"Can't Turn Back"	Mikkel SE, Rustan, Hermansen, Jackson, Duguid	3:30
4.	"Overdrive"	Jackson, Duguid, Robson, Poole	3:14
5.	"Talk to Me"	Jackson, Duguid, Robson	3:14
6.	"Please"	Harrington, Howes, Jackson, Duguid	3:34
7.	"Seven Nights"	Jackson, Duguid	3:20
8.	"Thinking About You Lately"	Jackson, Duguid	3:07
9.	"Save Yourself"	Jackson, Duguid	3:40
10.	"Walk On By"	Harrington, Howes, Jackson, Duguid	3:27
11.	"Last Surprise"	Jackson, Duguid	3:25
12.	"All That Matters"	Mikkel SE, Rustan, Hermansen, Jackson, Duguid	3:52
13.	"Always Here"	Jackson, Duguid	4:10
14.	"Genie in a Bottle"	Sheyne, Frank, Kipner	3:07
