= Jenny Don't Be Hasty =

2006 single by Paolo Nutini

Single by Paolo Nutini

from the album These Streets
- B-side: "January" (live); "Rainbows"
- Released: 25 September 2006
- Length: 3:31
- Label: Atlantic
- Songwriters: Paolo Nutini, Jimmy Hogarth
- Producer: Ken Nelson

Paolo Nutini singles chronology
"Last Request" (2006)	"Jenny Don't Be Hasty" (2006)	"Rewind" (2006)

Music video
- "Jenny Don't Be Hasty") on YouTube

"Jenny Don't Be Hasty" is a song by Scottish singer-songwriter Paolo Nutini, written with Jimmy Hogarth and produced by Ken Nelson. The song was released as Nutini's second single on 25 September 2006 from his debut album, These Streets (2006).

The lyrics, a personal experience of the singer, are about an 18-year-old boy who wants to have a relationship with an older woman who is angry at him for having lied to her about his real age and now says he is too young. "Jenny Don't Be Hasty" song reached number 20 on the UK Singles Chart, and in Australia, it peaked at number 40 on the ARIA Singles Chart in April 2007.

== Track listings ==
UK and European CD single

1. "Jenny Don't Be Hasty"
2. "January" (live)

UK maxi-CD single

1. "Jenny Don't Be Hasty"
2. "Rainbows"
3. "Jenny Don't Be Hasty" (video)
4. "Jenny Don't Be Hasty" (making of the video)

UK 7-inch single

A. "Jenny Don't Be Hasty"
B. "Rainbows" (live)

Australian CD single

1. "Jenny Don't Be Hasty"
2. "January" (live from Glasgow Garage, July 2006)
3. "Rainbows" (live from Glasgow Garage, July 2006)

== Charts ==
=== Weekly charts ===
Chart (2006–2007)	Peak position
Australia (ARIA)	40
Ireland (IRMA)	38
Netherlands (Single Top 100)	69
Scottish Singles Sales (Official Charts)	3
Switzerland (Schweizer Hitparade)	56
UK Singles (Official Charts)	20

=== Year-end charts ===
Chart (2006)	Position
UK Singles (OCC)	159

== Certifications ==
Region	Certification	Certified units/sales
New Zealand (RMNZ)	Gold	15,000^{‡}
United Kingdom (BPI)	Platinum	600,000^{‡}
^{‡} Sales+streaming figures based on certification alone.
