= These Streets =

Studio album by Paolo Nutini
- Released: 17 July 2006
- Genre: Pop rock
- Length: 44:26
- Label: Atlantic
- Producers: Ken Nelson, Jim Duguid, Tom Elmhirst, Andy Green

Paolo Nutini chronology
These Streets (2006)	Sunny Side Up (2009)

Singles from These Streets
- 1. "Last Request" Released: 3 July 2006; 2. "Jenny Don't Be Hasty" Released: 25 September 2006; 3. "Rewind" Released: 4 December 2006; 4. "New Shoes" Released: 12 March 2007

These Streets is the debut studio album by Scottish singer-songwriter Paolo Nutini, released by Atlantic Records on 17 July 2006. Preceded by the single "Last Request", the album debuted and peaked at number 3 on the UK Albums Chart and was later certified six times Platinum by the British Phonographic Industry for domestic shipments in excess of 1,800,000 copies. It also entered the charts in many other European countries, and in 2011 it was certified double Platinum by the International Federation of the Phonographic Industry for sales of over 2,000,000 copies in Europe.

== Background ==
Most of the songs featured on the album were inspired by the end of Nutini's relationships with his long-term girlfriend Teri Brogan, and another girl which began when they were still in their teens. Among the others, "Last Request" describes the couple's last night together, while "Rewind" expresses the willing of turning back time before the end of another relationship were his lover left him alone in a hotel. Another auto-biographical intimate relationship served as the inspiration for the album's second single, "Jenny Don't Be Hasty", which tells about Nutini's involvement with an older woman who refused him because of his age.

Other tracks from the album explore different themes, like the title-track, which describes the feelings of a boy who leaves his hometown to move to a big city, or "New Shoes", a song telling about a man who finds life easier as he wears a new pair of shoes. According to Nutini, the song was written trying to imagine if solving problems could be as easy as buying shoes is.

== Critical reception ==
Professional ratings
Review scores
Source	Rating
AllMusic	3.5/5 stars
IndieLondon	3.5/5 stars
The Observer	3/5 stars
Rolling Stone	2/5 stars
The New York Times	(positive)
USA Today	3.5/4 stars

These Streets garnered mostly positive reviews from music critics. Marisa Brown of AllMusic praised Nutini's ability to convey mature honesty by crafting songs that carry effective lyrics and catchy melodies, concluding that the record "won't blow anyone away with its creativeness or ingenuity, but it's done well and it's direct and open and enjoyable to listen to, which is more than enough." Nick Levine of The Observer saw potential in Nutini's "talent for elegant, melodic songwriting and an admirable willingness to vary the tempo." He concluded with, "[T]here is a glut of singer-songwriters right now but, on this evidence, the half-Italian 18-year-old boasts more talent than most." Rolling Stone's Christian Hoard felt the album didn't have any replay value because it had songs that lacked strong choruses and recognizable lyricism, saying that "For Nutini's lady fans, These Streets might be something to get hot and bothered about, but most of us could take or leave this useless beauty."

== Track listing ==
No.	Title	Writer(s)	Length
1.	"Jenny Don't Be Hasty"	Paolo Nutini, Jimmy Hogarth	3:29
2.	"Last Request"	Nutini, Jim Duguid, Matty Benbrook	3:42
3.	"Rewind"	Nutini, Duguid	4:19
4.	"Million Faces"	Nutini, Benbrook, Pauline Taylor	3:41
5.	"These Streets"	Nutini, Pete Wilkinson, Sarah Erasmus	3:53
6.	"New Shoes"	Nutini, Benbrook, Duguid	3:21
7.	"White Lies"	Nutini, John Fortis	4:00
8.	"Loving You"	Nutini, Duguid, Chris Leonard	4:00
9.	"Autumn"	Nutini, Duguid	2:50
10.	"Alloway Grove" (includes the acoustic version of "Last Request" as a hidden track)	Nutini, Rollo Armstrong	14:12

French Edition Bonus Tracks
No.	Title	Writer(s)	Length
11.	"No No No"	Nutini, Benbrook, Taylor	3:45
12.	"Sugar Man"	Sixto Diaz Rodriguez	2:06
13.	"Caledonia" (Live at Garage, Glasgow)	Dougie MacLean	4:00

Live in Concert Version Bonus Tracks
No.	Title	Length
11.	"Last Request" (Live from Kentish Town Forum)	3:45
12.	"Rewind" (Live from Kentish Town Forum)	5:01
13.	"Jenny Don't Be Hasty" (Live from Kentish Town Forum)	5:08
14.	"New Shoes" (Live from Kentish Town Forum)	4:09
15.	"Rainbows" (Live from Kentish Town Forum)	4:30

Festival Edition Disc 2 (recorded live at the Isle of Wight Festival 2007)
No.	Title	Writer(s)	Length
1.	"Alloway Grove"	Nutini, Rollo Armstrong	4:25
2.	"New Shoes"	Nutini, Benbrook, Duguid	4:04
3.	"Rewind"	Nutini, Duguid	4:34
4.	"These Streets"	Nutini, Wilkinson, Erasmus	3:38
5.	"Troubled So Hard (Natural Blues)"	Moby, Vera Hall	3:34
6.	"Last Request"	Nutini, Duguid, Benbrook	4:09
7.	"I Want To Be Like You"	Robert B. Sherman, Richard M. Sherman	2:36
8.	"Jenny Don't Be Hasty"	Nutini, Hogarth	5:21

== Personnel ==
- Paolo Nutini – acoustic guitar, vocals, background vocals
- Matt Benbrook – guitar, bass, keyboards, strings, programming
- Jim Duguid – double bass, drums, keyboards, percussion, piano, strings
- Eddie Harrison – guitar
- Vicky Hollywood – cello
- Michael Hunter – bass guitar, double bass
- Donny Little – acoustic guitar, slide guitar, background vocals
- The London Session Orchestra – strings
- Will Malone – string arrangements
- Michael McDaid – bass guitar
- Dave Nally – piano, organ
- Ken Nelson – electric guitar, piano, Hammond organ, recorder
- Pauline Taylor – background vocals

Technical

- Chris Athens – mastering
- Michael Brauer – mixing
- Dean Chalkley – photography
- Jim Duguid – A&R assistance, assistance, production
- Tom Elmhirst – mixing, production
- Robert Gold – art direction
- Andy Green – mixing, production
- Paul Wesley Griggs – photography
- Thomas Haimovici – A&R
- Dominic Leung – cover design
- Brendan Moon – A&R assistance, assistant
- Gregg Nadel – product management
- Ken Nelson – engineering, mixing, production, recording
- Conor O'Mahony – A&R
- Mark Pythian – engineering, mixing
- Richard Skinner – creative direction
- Richard Wilkinson – engineering
- Julian Wilmott – assistance

== Charts ==
=== Weekly charts ===
Chart (2006–2014)	Peak position
Australian Albums (ARIA)	16
Austrian Albums (Ö3 Austria)	23
Belgian Albums (Ultratop Wallonia)	26
Danish Albums (Hitlisten)	18
Dutch Albums (Album Top 100)	17
French Albums (SNEP)	19
German Albums (Offizielle Top 100)	28
Irish Albums (IRMA)	10
Italian Albums (FIMI)	37
Norwegian Albums (VG-lista)	14
Scottish Albums (Official Charts)	2
Swedish Albums (Sverigetopplistan)	24
Swiss Albums (Schweizer Hitparade)	19
UK Albums (Official Charts)	3
US Billboard 200	48
US Top Rock Albums (Billboard)	12

=== Year-end charts ===
Chart (2006)	Position
UK Albums (OCC)	24
Chart (2007)	Position
Belgian Albums (Ultratop Wallonia)	78
Dutch Albums (Album Top 100)	72
French Albums (SNEP)	92
Swiss Albums (Schweizer Hitparade)	74
UK Albums (OCC)	29
Chart (2009)	Position
UK Albums (OCC)	95
Chart (2010)	Position
UK Albums (OCC)	65
Chart (2011)	Position
UK Albums (OCC)	161

== Certifications ==
Region	Certification	Certified units/sales
Australia (ARIA)	Gold	35,000^{^}
France (SNEP)	Gold	75,000^{*}
Ireland (IRMA)	2× Platinum	30,000^{^}
Italy (FIMI)	Gold	25,000^{*}
New Zealand (RMNZ)	Gold	7,500^{‡}
Switzerland (IFPI Switzerland)	Platinum	30,000^{^}
United Kingdom (BPI)	6× Platinum	1,800,000^{‡}
United States	—	114,000
Summaries
Europe (IFPI)	2× Platinum	2,000,000^{*}
^{*} Sales figures based on certification alone.^{^} Shipments figures based on certification alone.^{‡} Sales+streaming figures based on certification alone.

== Release history ==
Region	Release date	Format	Label
United Kingdom	17 July 2006	CD, download	Atlantic
Italy	29 September 2006	CD, download	Atlantic
United States	30 January 2007	CD, download	Atlantic
