= Coming Up Easy =

Single by Paolo Nutini

from the album Sunny Side Up
- Released: 10 August 2009
- Recorded: 2009
- Genre: Pop, blue-eyed soul, folk
- Length: 4:18
- Label: Atlantic
- Songwriters: Paolo Nutini, Matty Benbrook
- Producer: Ethan Johns

Paolo Nutini singles chronology
"Candy" (2009)	"Coming Up Easy" (2009)	"Pencil Full of Lead" (2009)

"Coming Up Easy" is the second single from Scottish singer/songwriter Paolo Nutini's second album, Sunny Side Up. The song was released on 10 August 2009 as a CD single, 7" single and download single, following Nutini's previous UK top 20 hit single "Candy".

== Background ==
"Coming Up Easy" is the second track on Nutini's second album Sunny Side Up. The song was co-written by Nutini and Matty Benbrook. It was produced by Ethan Johns.

The song's content concentrates on Nutini's struggles with marijuana but Nutini has expressed that it can be listened to from other perspectives. Nutini stated: "It's about my own conflict I had about marijuana but you can hear it as a song about relationships, compromising, having to deal with someone else's emotions. It's about bad habits and breaking up, but I wanted to keep it positive.".

== Critical reception ==
Music website ilike gave "Coming Up Easy" a positive review, stating:

Written by Paolo Nutini and produced by Paolo and Ethan Johns (Kings of Leon) the rolling soul of Coming Up Easy is one of many highlights on Sunny Side Up. Paolo's mesmerising and powerful voice has no equal, which is beautifully portrayed through the soulful swing of Coming Up Easy.

While the BBC were less positive:

"This, while a nice song, is not one of the most precious treasures. Which makes it an odd choice for a single.

The trouble is, the one thing Paolo should have maybe stopped himself from doing is the painstaking recreation of that big Jools Holland-approved '60s soul sound. Y'know, like in The Commitments. He's got the voice for it, he clearly knows the turf well enough to pen a decent ditty in that style, but compared to the giddy fun of 'Pencil Full of Lead', or the spiralling South American folk-gospel of 'High Hopes', 'Coming Up Easy' just sounds too reverential to the past. Too obvious.". 3/5

== Track listings ==
CD
No.	Title	Length
1.	"Coming Up Easy" (Album Version)	4:18
2.	"High Hopes"	2:57
3.	"Gimme Shelter"	4:27

7" Vinyl
No.	Title	Length
1.	"Coming Up Easy" (Album Version)	4:18
2.	"Beeswing" (Live at the BBC)	3:49

Digital Download
No.	Title	Length
1.	"Coming Up Easy" (Album Version)	4:18
2.	"High Hopes"	2:57
3.	"Beeswing" (Live at the BBC)	3:49
4.	"Candy" (Live at the BBC)	5:37

== Music video ==
The "Coming Up Easy" music video was released on 28 July 2009. The video saw Nutini making friends with a giant bunny rabbit and heading down to the pub with him where they share a few pints, play darts and almost end up in a bar brawl.

== Chart performance ==
"Coming Up Easy" charted and peaked at number sixty-two in the UK Singles Chart. The song became Nutini's sixth consecutive top 75 hit in UK but remains his lowest peaking single to date.

Chart (2009)	Peak position
Belgian (Flanders) Tip Chart	9
UK Singles Chart	62

== Certifications ==
Region	Certification	Certified units/sales
United Kingdom (BPI)	Gold	400,000^{‡}
^{‡} Sales+streaming figures based on certification alone.
