= Pencil Full of Lead =

2009 single by Paolo Nutini

Single by Paolo Nutini

from the album Sunny Side Up
- Released: 2 November 2009
- Recorded: 2009
- Genre: Jazz pop
- Length: 2:26
- Label: Atlantic
- Songwriter: Paolo Nutini
- Producers: Paolo Nutini, Ethan Johns

Paolo Nutini singles chronology
"Coming Up Easy" (2009)	"Pencil Full of Lead" (2009)	"10/10" (2010)

"Pencil Full of Lead" is a song by Scottish recording artist Paolo Nutini. The song was released in the United Kingdom on 2 November 2009 as the third single from his second studio album, Sunny Side Up (2009). A music video of the song having been released on 20 October 2009. The song peaked at #17 on the UK Singles Chart and #33 on the Irish Singles Chart.

The distinctive trumpet riff to the song is played by Gavin Fitzjohn.

== Promotion ==
Nutini performed the song on various UK TV shows including The Graham Norton Show and, with his band The Vipers, performed the song with other album tracks at Willton Music Hall before the album was released. Nutini also performed the song live at the Royal Albert Hall in November 2009 for Children in Need.

The song was chosen as one of the Desert Island Discs of Len Goodman.

== Critical reception ==
Angryape.com said:

The fact Paolo Nutini's second album Sunny Side Up still resides in the UK top 10 five months after it was first released in June, speaks volumes. It's songs like new single 'Pencil Full of Lead' that have elevated the Scottish star from unknown singer-songwriter to a surprise household name and hit-maker in the three years since debut These Streets landed.

Continuing his love of classic sounds like rock-n-roll, folk, soul and jazz, this time Nutini lends his bluesy vocals (which appear to sound more weathered, and far beyond his years every time a new song arrives), to an uptempo ragtime pop track, littered with harmonicas, trumpets and jaunty percussion. Without fear of sounding overly cheesy, it's a timeless hit-in-the-making that'll still sound as feel-good in 30 years time.

Fraser McAlpine on the BBC Radio 1 Chart Blog wrote:

This is a sentence everyone should carry round with them at all times. It would solve a lot of tedious chat using words like "vintage" and "seminal" and "authentic", or "cutting-edge" and "innovative" and (absolutely the very very worst worst of all) "zeitgeist".

There are things which are good, and there are things which are not good, and that (as Girls Aloud, who are good) once said, is that.

There are no guest rappers, no modern production effects on his voice, no lyrics about current TV shows, nothing about sleazy sex in hotel rooms, nothing about alienation, nothing about the state of modern urban youth and no disco stick.

He does, however, mention having a pencil full of lead, and if I'm not mistaken, that's a saucy metaphor. Either that or he's been sold a lot of lead-less pencils in his time, and after all, what is a pencil without lead but a stick?

== Music video ==
The music video for the song was added to YouTube on 20 October 2009. It was directed by Corin Hardy. The video is set in a television studio and opens with a view from the control room. The performance begins with a coloured clay model of Nutini singing amongst an all-female band of real musicians and dancers. He starts to grope the band members and one of the dancers slaps him across the face, radically deforming his clay features. The music stops and an awkward pause ensues as the production staff assess the situation. One of the dancers flattens his hand under her foot, but escapes and runs away as the girls chase him, hitting a camera and tripping over a wire trap that the girls have set. The video ends with the women playing with the component clay parts of Nutini. The video ends with a mini-model of Nutini springing back to life from her hand, and him trying to hide his naked body from view.

== Track listing ==
UK CD single
No.	Title	Length
1.	"Pencil Full of Lead" (Album Version)	2:26

== Charts and certifications ==
=== Weekly charts ===
Chart (2009)	Peak position
European Hot 100 Singles	56
Ireland (IRMA)	33
Scotland Singles (OCC)	10
UK Singles (OCC)	17

=== Year-end charts ===
Chart (2009)	Position
UK Singles Chart	159

=== Certifications ===
Region	Certification	Certified units/sales
United Kingdom (BPI)	Platinum	600,000^{‡}
^{‡} Sales+streaming figures based on certification alone.
