= Paolo Nutini =

Scottish singer, songwriter and musician (born 1987)

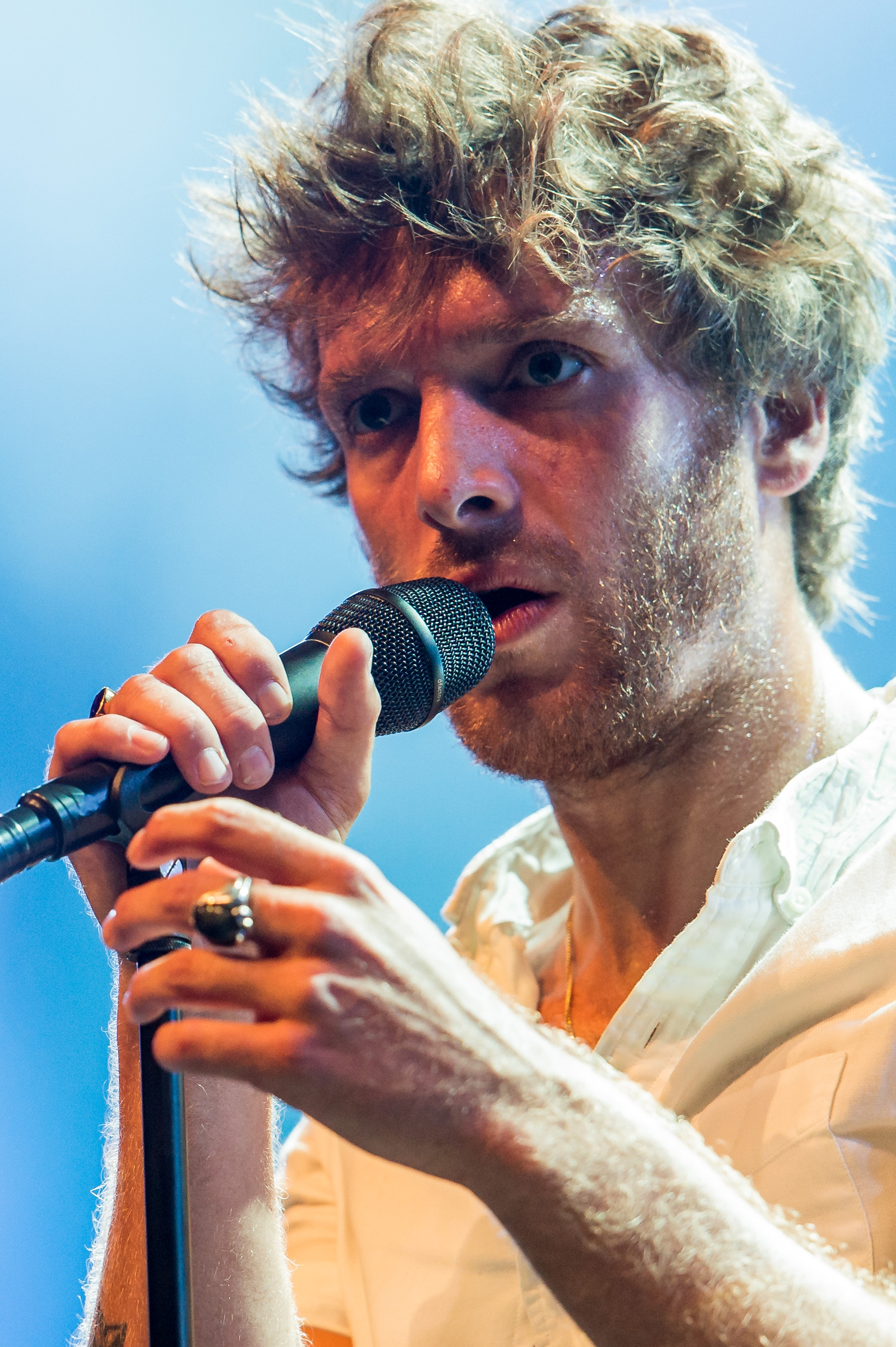
- Nutini at Montreux Jazz Festival 2015

Background information
- Born: Paolo Giovanni Nutini; 9 January 1987 (age 39); Paisley, Renfrewshire, Scotland
- Genres: Pop rock; blue-eyed soul; folk
- Occupations: Singer-songwriter, musician
- Instruments: Vocals, guitar, keyboards, bass
- Years active: 2005–present
- Label: Atlantic
- Website: paolonutini.com

Paolo Giovanni Nutini (born 9 January 1987) is a Scottish singer-songwriter from Paisley, Renfrewshire, Scotland. Nutini's debut album, These Streets (2006), peaked at number three on the UK Albums Chart. Its follow-up, Sunny Side Up (2009), debuted at number one on the UK Albums Chart. Both albums have been certified quintuple platinum by the British Phonographic Industry. Five years later, Nutini released his third studio album, Caustic Love, in April 2014, which debuted at number one on the UK Albums Chart and was certified platinum by the BPI. In July 2022, he released his fourth album, Last Night in the Bittersweet.

Among other accolades, Nutini has received three BRIT Award nominations and an Ivor Novello Award nomination for songwriting.

== Early life ==
Paolo Nutini was born on 9 January 1987 in Paisley, Scotland, and has a younger sister. His father, Alfredo, is a Scot of Italian descent from Barga in Tuscany, while his mother, Linda, is of Scottish descent. He was expected to follow his father into the family's fish and chip shop business. As a child he attended PACE Youth Theatre. He was first encouraged to sing by his music-loving grandfather, Giovanni "Jackie" Nutini, and a teacher at his school, St Andrews Academy, who recognised his talent.

Nutini left school to work as a roadie and to sell t-shirts for Scottish band Speedway. He spent three years learning the music business and performing live. He later worked as a studio hand at Glasgow's Park Lane Studio. It was here where he started demo-ing songs, writing with Jim Duguid, the drummer of Speedway.

At 17, Nutini moved to London and performed regularly at The Bedford pub in Balham with local singer-songwriter Charlie Wallis. Other radio and live appearances followed, including two live acoustic spots on Radio London, The Hard Rock Cafe, and support slots for The Rolling Stones, Amy Winehouse and KT Tunstall.

== Career ==
=== These Streets (2005–2007) ===
Nutini made his first demo which saw him signed to Atlantic Records in May 2005, shortly after his 18th birthday. He released his first single "These Streets" as a free download in May 2006; this was then followed by his next single "Last Request" which was released on 4 July 2006 and charted at number five on the UK Singles Chart. In the video for "Last Request", Nutini plays the part of a robber – though this is not revealed until the end. Nutini's third single, "Jenny Don't Be Hasty", was released on 25 September 2006 and got to number twenty on the UK Singles Chart. "Rewind" was Nutini's fourth single. It was released on 4 December 2006, and reached number twenty seven on the UK Singles Chart.

Nutini's debut album These Streets, produced by Ken Nelson, was released on 17 July 2006 and immediately entered the UK albums chart at number three. Many of the songs on the album, including "Last Request" and "Rewind", were inspired by a turbulent relationship with his former girlfriend Teri Brogan, and "Jenny Don't Be Hasty" is a true story about encounters with an older woman.

The album has been certified quintuple platinum by the British Phonographic Industry.

In late 2007, Nutini covered Labi Siffre's "It Must Be Love" for BBC Radio 1's Radio 1 Established 1967 album.

Throughout 2006, Nutini played a number of concerts across Britain and performed at a variety of venues worldwide, including King Tut's Wah Wah Hut in Glasgow, a TV appearance on Later with Jools Holland, Carnegie Hall in New York, The Montreux Jazz Festival, The Wireless Festival, Oxegen and T in the Park. He supported the Rolling Stones in Vienna and at the Don Valley Stadium in August 2006. He also played at the V Festival, The Austin City Limits Music Festival, Texas, and at BBC Radio 1's Big Weekend in Dundee.

Nutini performed at the Glastonbury Festival in June 2007 on the Pyramid Stage on the second day of the event, and at the British leg of Live Earth at Wembley Stadium on 7 July 2007. He performed the following day at T in the Park, in Scotland. He performed at the Ahmet Ertegun Tribute Concert on 10 December 2007, an event that was the first full live concert performance by Led Zeppelin in 27 years. Scottish independent TV company Volt MediaFix made a one-off documentary of Nutini's US tour. The programme, for the BBC, was scheduled for broadcast on BBC2, on Thursday 7 June throughout Scotland and on Sky channel 990 throughout the rest of Britain.

=== Sunny Side Up (2009–2011) ===
On 1 June 2009, Nutini released his second studio album Sunny Side Up, which debuted at number one. The first single from the album, "Candy", was released on 25 May. In July, he appeared on Friday Night with Jonathan Ross, performing "Coming Up Easy". This was released as the second single to the album on 10 August and it debuted at number 62 in the UK Singles Chart on 16 August 2009. On 10 September 2009, Nutini performed "Coming Up Easy" on The Tonight Show with Conan O'Brien. The third single from the album was "Pencil Full of Lead".

The album received a mixed critical reception. Some noted the move away from the sound of the debut album. Neil McCormick of The Daily Telegraph was also positive, stating "his joyous second album organically blends soul, country, folk and the brash, horny energy of ragtime swing." Some reviewers were less impressed. It was described by The Guardian's Caroline Sullivan as "not bad", with opening track "10/10" described as "jaunty enough to make you retch".

The album debuted at number one on the UK Albums Chart with sales of over 60,000 copies, fighting off strong competition from Love & War, the debut album of fellow male solo artist Daniel Merriweather. The album performed similarly well on the Irish Albums Chart, debuting at number two behind Eminem's new album before rising to the top of the chart the week after. The album has been one of the best UK album sales of the year. On the UK Albums Chart on the week of Monday 19 October, the album went from number 31 to number 5, making the album sell more than The Saturdays' second album. On 3 January 2010 Sunny Side Up topped the UK Albums Chart for a second time, making the album the first Number one album in the United Kingdom of 2010 and the decade.

This album was also certified quintuple platinum by the British Phonographic Industry.

=== Caustic Love (2013–2016) ===
In December 2013, it was revealed that Nutini had recorded a third album called Caustic Love, which was released on 14 April 2014. The album's first single "Scream (Funk My Life Up)" was released on 27 January. The Independent newspaper described the album as, "an unqualified success: Caustic Love may be the best UK R&B album since the 1970s blue-eyed-soul heyday of Rod Stewart and Joe Cocker". It was selected on 8 December 2014 by Apple to become the Best Album in iTunes' 'Best of 2014'. Caustic Love debuted at number one on the UK Albums Chart and was certified platinum by the BPI in June 2014.

An 18-month tour following the release of Caustic Love saw Nutini perform in North America, Europe, South Africa, Australia and New Zealand. In October 2014 Nutini was forced to pull out of shows in his hometown of Glasgow, Cardiff and London due to tonsillitis. In August 2015 Nutini headlined a show to 35,000 people at Bellahouston Park in Glasgow.

After touring in 2015 in support of Caustic Love, Nutini took a hiatus in 2016 although he performed at a tribute in memory of a Welsh fan in Newport, Wales on 20 July. On 20 September 2016 it was announced that Nutini would headline the Concert in the Gardens, the flagship event of Edinburgh's Hogmanay street party, on New Year's Eve 2016/2017. Tickets were sold out in three hours leading to a second show (named "The Night Afore") being announced for 30 December.

=== Last Night in the Bittersweet (2022–present) ===
Over eight years following the release of Caustic Love, Nutini announced on 11 May 2022 that his fourth studio album, Last Night in the Bittersweet, would be released on 1 July 2022. Alongside the announcement, he released two songs from the album, titled "Through the Echoes" and "Lose It". On 8 July 2022, he headlined TRNSMT festival.

== Media appearances ==
On Hogmanay 2006, Nutini appeared on BBC Scotland's Hogmanay Live celebrations after the official celebrations in Princes Street Gardens were cancelled at short notice due to bad weather. He performed several songs in the Great Hall of Edinburgh Castle for the TV audience with little or no rehearsal. On Wednesday 11 April 2007, Nutini performed in a concert that was streamed live via MSN Music.

On 24 July 2007, Nutini was awarded The Golden St Christopher medal by the city of Barga in Italy, the highest honour the city can give, to celebrate his extraordinary contributions to Barga and its people. On 18 September, Nutini performed "Last Request" on The Tonight Show with Jay Leno. In September 2007, Nutini recorded a short radio show with imeem.com where he listed his top 10 favourite tracks and the reasons behind his choices. In October 2007, Nutini performed for the annual Voodoo Fest held in New Orleans, Louisiana.

On New Year's Eve 2008–09, Nutini performed at the Hogmanay street parties in both Edinburgh and Glasgow, Scotland, becoming the first act to play both locations on the same day for the event. In The View's 2009 album Which Bitch?, he is featured singing on the song "Covers". Nutini appeared in the 2011 documentary Reggae Got Soul: The Story of Toots and the Maytals which was featured on BBC and described as "The untold story of one of the most influential artists ever to come out of Jamaica".

On 27 July 2012, Nutini sang at the London 2012 Olympic Games Opening Ceremony Concert in London's Hyde Park, along with Duran Duran, Snow Patrol and Stereophonics.

== Personal life ==
Nutini had an eight-year on-again, off-again relationship with Teri Brogan, whom he met while they were pupils at St Andrew's Academy in Paisley. After their split, he was romantically involved with Irish TV presenter and model Laura Whitmore. Nutini also had a relationship with English actress and model Amber Anderson from 2014 until 2016.

Nutini stated in a June 2014 interview that he has smoked cannabis every day of his life since the age of sixteen. Nutini also has an Honorary Doctorate from his hometown university in Paisley, the University of the West of Scotland.

As of 2017, Nutini was living in his home town of Paisley, and he performed karaoke there in 2019.

In July 2019, Paolo donated over £10,000 to the charity Tiny Changes by buying and raffling off the Chewbacca mask worn on stage by fellow Scottish musician Lewis Capaldi at TRNSMT.

Nutini is a supporter of Celtic F.C.

== Discography ==
- These Streets (2006)
- Sunny Side Up (2009)
- Caustic Love (2014)
- Last Night in the Bittersweet (2022)

== Awards and nominations ==
List of awards and nominations received by Paolo Nutini
Year	Award	Category	Work	Result	Ref.
2007	BRIT Awards	British Male	—N/a	Nominated	
2008	ASCAP Awards	Songwriting	"New Shoes"	Won	
2009	UK Music Video Awards	Best Cinematography	"Candy"	Nominated	
2009	UK Music Video Awards	Best Telecine	"Candy"	Won	
2009	UK Music Video Awards	Best Pop Video	"Candy"	Nominated	
2010	BRIT Awards	British Male Solo Artist	—N/a	Nominated	
2010	BRIT Awards	British Album	Sunny Side Up	Nominated	
2010	Ivor Novello Awards	Album Award	Sunny Side Up	Won	
2010	Meteor Awards	Best International Album	Sunny Side Up	Won	
2010	Meteor Awards	Best International Male	—N/a	Nominated	
2010	Q Awards	Best Male	—N/a	Won	
2010	Scottish Fashion Awards	Style Icon of the Year	—N/a	Won	
2010	Tartan Clef Awards	Tartan Clef	—N/a	Won	
2010	UK Festival Awards	Feel Good Act of the Summer	—N/a	Won	
2011	UK Festival Awards	Headline Performance of the Year	Latitude Festival	Won	
2014	Q Awards	Best Track	"Iron Sky"	Won	
