= Last Request (song) =

2006 single by Paolo Nutini

Single by Paolo Nutini

from the album These Streets
- B-side: "No No No"; "Sugar Man"
- Released: 3 July 2006
- Length: 3:37
- Label: Atlantic
- Songwriters: Paolo Nutini; Jim Duguid; Matty Benbrook
- Producer: Ken Nelson

Paolo Nutini singles chronology
"Last Request" (2006)	"Jenny Don't Be Hasty" (2006)

"Last Request" is a song by Scottish singer-songwriter Paolo Nutini from his 2006 debut album, These Streets. The song was released on 3 July 2006 as Nutini's debut single and peaked at number five on the UK Singles Chart. The song's lyrics describe a person who knows his relationship is over, but he wants to have one last night with his partner.

== Music video ==
The video features Paolo Nutini along with other masked men robbing a jewellery shop before the police arrive and shoot Nutini who appears to die at the end of the video.

== Track listings ==
UK CD1

1. "Last Request"
2. "Last Request" (live version)
3. "Last Request" (video)
4. "Last Request" (making of)

UK CD2 and European CD single

1. "Last Request"
2. "No No No"

UK 7-inch single

A. "Last Request"
B. "Sugar Man"

Australian CD single

1. "Last Request"
2. "No, No, No"
3. "Sugar Man"

== Personnel ==
Personnel are taken from the These Streets album booklet.

- Paolo Nutini – writing, vocals
- Jim Duguid – writing
- Matty Benbrook – writing, strings, additional programming, string production
- Donny Little – backing vocals, guitar, acoustic guitar
- Ken Nelson – guitar, production
- Eddie Harrison – guitar
- Mike Hunter – bass
- Jim Duguid – keyboards, drums, percussion
- Tom Elmhirst – mixing
- Mark Phythian – engineering
- Darren Simpson – assistant engineering
- Richard Wilkinson – additional engineering

== Charts ==
=== Weekly charts ===
Chart (2006–2008)	Peak position
Australia (ARIA)	67
Austria (Ö3 Austria Top 40)	20
Belgium (Ultratip Bubbling Under Wallonia)	9
Denmark (Tracklisten)	16
Europe (Eurochart Hot 100)	19
France (SNEP)	20
Germany (GfK)	65
Ireland (IRMA)	8
Italy (FIMI)	15
Scotland Singles (OCC)	1
Switzerland (Schweizer Hitparade)	42
UK Singles (OCC)	5
US Adult Alternative Airplay (Billboard)	3
US Adult Pop Airplay (Billboard)	30

=== Year-end charts ===
Chart (2006)	Position
UK Singles (OCC)	45

== Certifications ==
Region	Certification	Certified units/sales
Italy (FIMI)	Gold	25,000^{‡}
New Zealand (RMNZ)	Platinum	30,000^{‡}
United Kingdom (BPI)	4× Platinum	2,400,000^{‡}
^{‡} Sales+streaming figures based on certification alone.

== Release history ==
Region	Date	Format(s)	Label(s)	Ref.
United Kingdom	3 July 2006	CD	Atlantic	
Australia	18 September 2006	CD	Atlantic	

== Cover versions ==
In 2017, the song was covered by British singer Amber Leigh Irish for use in a TV advertising campaign for the British bed retailer and manufacturer Dreams. The recording was subsequently released as a charity single, with all proceeds going to The Fostering Network. Singer-songwriter Zayn Malik covered the song while on his 2024–2025 Stairway to the Sky Tour. He had previously uploaded a video of him covering the song on Instagram as well.
