= Rudimental discography =

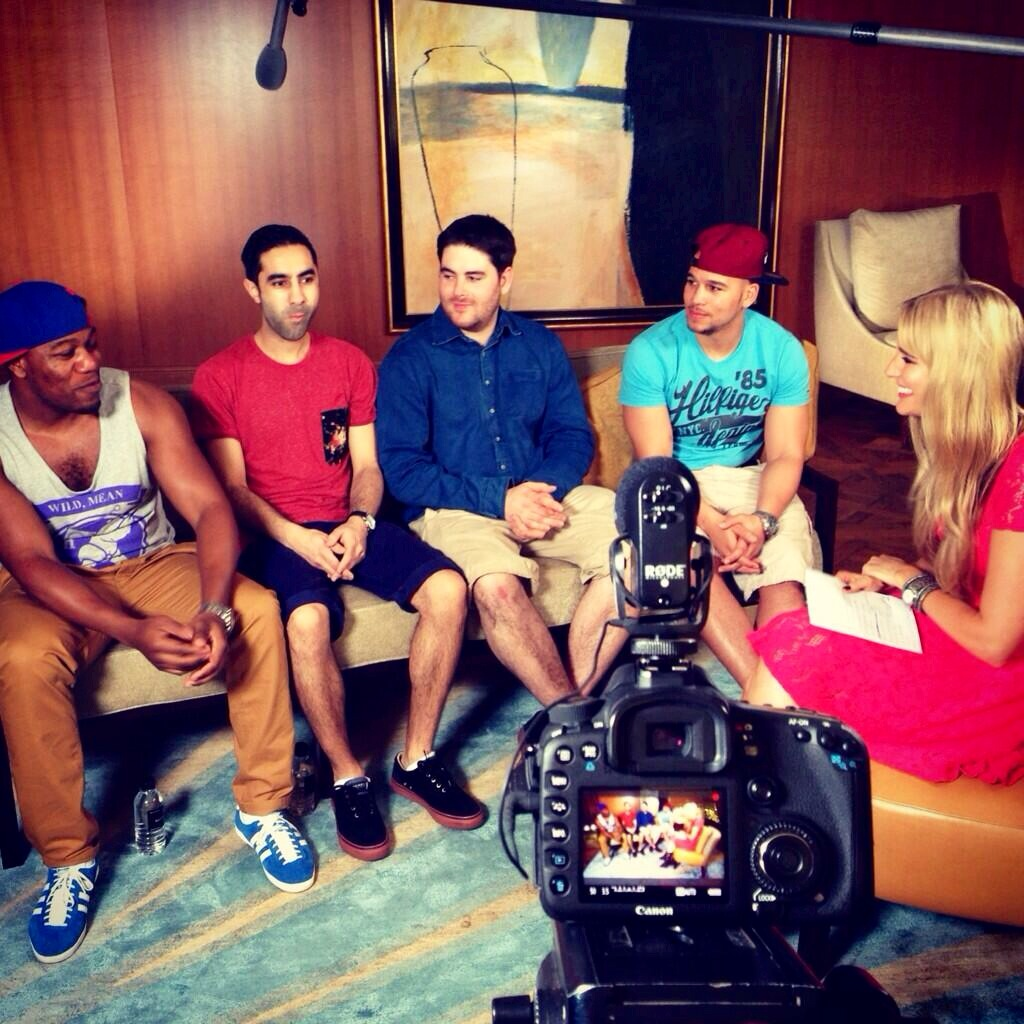
- Kylie Speer interviewing Rudimental in 2013
- Studio albums: 5
- EPs: 1
- Singles: 49

English drum and bass band Rudimental has released five studio albums, one extended play and forty-nine singles.

Their debut studio album, Home, was released in April 2013. The album reached number one on the UK Albums Chart. On 14 May 2012, they released "Feel the Love", featuring vocals from John Newman, as the album's lead single. The song entered the UK Singles Chart at number one, making it their first number one single in the UK. The song also was a top 5 hit in Australia, Belgium, the Netherlands, and New Zealand, also charting in Austria, Denmark, Germany, and Ireland. On 18 November 2012, they released the album's second single "Not Giving In", featuring vocals from Newman and Alex Clare. It debuted and peaked at number 14 on the UK Singles Chart. "Waiting All Night", featuring Ella Eyre, was released as the third single from the album in 2013, reaching number one in the UK Singles Chart on 21 April 2013. The next single released was "Powerless", featuring Becky Hill.

Their second studio album, We the Generation, was released on 2 October 2015. Rudimental were given a writing credit on "Bloodstream" by Ed Sheeran, taken from his second studio album, x. On 28 April 2015, the band unveiled a new song called "Never Let You Go", which was the lead single from the album.

Rudimental released their third album, Toast to Our Differences on 25 January 2019. It is preceded by the singles "Sun Comes Up", "These Days" (which became their third number one) and "Let Me Live".

== Studio albums ==
Title	Details	Peak chart positions										Certifications
Title	Details	UK	AUS	AUT	BEL (FL)	IRE	NL	NZ	SCO	SWI	US	Certifications
Home	Released: 29 April 2013; Label: Asylum, Atlantic, Warner; Format: CD, digital download	1	2	56	23	5	41	2	1	34	—	BPI: 2× Platinum; ARIA: Platinum; RMNZ: 3× Platinum
We the Generation	Released: 2 October 2015; Label: Asylum, Atlantic, Warner; Format: CD, digital download	1	4	—	14	8	41	5	1	32	190	BPI: Gold; RMNZ: Platinum
Toast to Our Differences	Released: 25 January 2019; Label: Asylum, Atlantic, Warner; Format: CD, digital download, streaming	5	41	—	66	31	68	20	18	31	—	BPI: Silver; RMNZ: Platinum
Ground Control	Released: 3 September 2021; Label: Asylum, Atlantic, Warner; Format: Cassette, CD, digital download, streaming, vinyl	16	―	―	―	―	―	―	―	―	―	
Rudim3ntal	Released: 22 August 2025; Label: Room Two; Format: Cassette, CD, digital download, streaming, vinyl	31	―	―	―	―	―	36	―	―	―	
"—" denotes an album that did not chart or was not released in that territory.

== Extended plays ==
Title	Details
Distinction	Released: 9 August 2019; Label: Asylum, Atlantic, Warner; Format: Digital download, streaming

== Singles ==
=== As lead artist ===
Title	Year	Peak chart positions										Certifications	Album
Title	Year	UK	AUS	AUT	BEL	GER	IRE	NL	NZ	SCO	US	Certifications	Album
"Deep in the Valley" (featuring MC Shantie)	2011	—	—	—	—	—	—	—	—	—	—		Non-album singles
"Speeding" (featuring Adiyam)	2011	—	—	—	—	—	—	—	—	—	—		Non-album singles
"Spoons" (featuring MNEK and Syron)	2012	—	—	—	—	—	—	—	—	—	—		Home
"Feel the Love" (featuring John Newman)	2012	1	3	14	2	59	26	2	4	1	—	BPI: 3× Platinum; ARIA: 3× Platinum; BEA: Gold; RMNZ: 3× Platinum	Home
"Not Giving In" (featuring John Newman and Alex Clare)	2012	14	12	—	54	—	54	71	11	16	—	BPI: Gold; ARIA: 2× Platinum; RMNZ: 2× Platinum	Home
"Waiting All Night" (featuring Ella Eyre)	2013	1	6	37	13	—	4	26	9	2	—	BPI: 3× Platinum; ARIA: Platinum; BEA: Gold; RMNZ: 4× Platinum	Home
"Right Here" (featuring Foxes)	2013	14	29	—	59	—	—	—	—	19	—	BPI: Silver; RMNZ: Platinum	Home
"Free" (featuring Emeli Sandé)	2013	26	5	41	36	38	9	—	5	32	—	BPI: Silver; ARIA: 4× Platinum; RMNZ: Platinum	Home
"Powerless" (featuring Becky Hill)	2014	73	—	—	—	—	—	—	—	—	—	BPI: Silver	Home
"Give You Up" (featuring Alex Clare)	2014	—	—	—	—	—	—	—	—	—	—		Home
"Bloodstream" (Note: "Bloodstream" also appears on Ed Sheeran's second studio album x.) (with Ed Sheeran)	2015	2	7	—	82	—	13	98	2	2	—	BPI: 3× Platinum; ARIA: Platinum; RMNZ: 2× Platinum	We the Generation
"Never Let You Go" (featuring Foy Vance)	2015	29	54	—	79	—	74	—	—	28	—		We the Generation
"I Will for Love" (featuring Will Heard)	2015	180	—	—	73	—	—	—	—	—	—		We the Generation
"Rumour Mill" (featuring Anne-Marie and Will Heard)	2015	67	68	—	63	—	—	—	—	—	—	BPI: Silver; RMNZ: Gold	We the Generation
"Lay It All on Me" (featuring Ed Sheeran)	2015	12	7	23	24	31	5	45	5	7	48	BPI: Platinum; ARIA: Platinum; BVMI: Gold; RIAA: Platinum; RMNZ: 3× Platinum	We the Generation
"Common Emotion" (featuring MNEK)	2016	—	—	—	—	—	—	—	—	—	—		We the Generation
"Sun Comes Up" (featuring James Arthur)	2017	6	57	50	51	76	15	—	— (Note: "Sun Comes Up" did not enter the NZ Top 40 Singles Chart, but peaked at number four on the NZ Heatseeker Singles Chart.)	9	—	BPI: 2× Platinum; ARIA: 2× Platinum; RMNZ: Platinum	Toast to Our Differences
"These Days" (featuring Jess Glynne, Macklemore and Dan Caplen)	2018	1	2	1	3	3	2	10	4	3	— (Note: "These Days" did not enter the Billboard Hot 100, but peaked at number five on the Bubbling Under Hot 100 Singles chart.)	BPI: 5× Platinum; ARIA: 5× Platinum; BVMI: Platinum; RIAA: Platinum; RMNZ: 5× Platinum	Toast to Our Differences
"Let Me Live" (with Major Lazer featuring Anne-Marie and Mr Eazi)	2018	42	77	—	16	—	43	73	— (Note: "Let Me Live" did not enter the NZ Top 40 Singles Chart, but peaked at number nine on the NZ Heatseeker Singles Chart.)	29	—	BPI: Silver; ARIA: Gold; RMNZ: Gold	Toast to Our Differences
"Walk Alone" (featuring Tom Walker)	2018	80	—	—	—	—	92	—	— (Note: "Walk Alone" did not enter the NZ Top 40 Singles Chart, but peaked at number 29 on the NZ Hot Singles Chart.)	80	—	BPI: Silver	Toast to Our Differences
"Summer Love" (with Rita Ora)	2018	—	—	—	—	—	—	—	—	—	—		Toast to Our Differences
"Scared of Love" (featuring Ray BLK and Stefflon Don)	2019	—	—	—	—	—	—	—	—	—	—		Toast to Our Differences
"Stigawana" (with The Martinez Brothers featuring Faith Mussa)	2019	—	—	—	94	—	—	—	—	—	—		Distinction
"Mean That Much" (with Preditah featuring Morgan)	2019	—	—	—	—	—	—	—	—	—	—		Distinction
"Something About You" (with Elderbrook)	2019	87	—	—	78	—	88	—	— (Note: "Something About You" did not enter the NZ Top 40 Singles Chart, but peaked at number 28 on the NZ Hot Singles Chart.)	57	—	BPI: Silver; RMNZ: Gold	Distinction
"Krazy" (featuring Afronaut Zu)	2020	—	—	—	—	—	—	—	—	—	—		Ground Control
"Easy on Me" (with the Martinez Brothers)	2020	—	—	—	—	—	—	—	—	—	—		Non-album single
"Come Over" (featuring Anne-Marie and Tion Wayne)	2020	26	—	—	—	—	—	—	—	46	—	BPI: Gold	Ground Control
"Blend" (with Netsky featuring Afronaut Zu)	2020	—	—	—	—	—	—	—	—	—	—		Second Nature
"Be Strong" (with Hot Since 82)	2020	—	—	—	—	—	—	—	—	—	—		Non-album single
"Be the One" (featuring Morgan, Digga D and Tike)	2020	49	—	—	—	—	—	—	— (Note: "Be the One" did not enter the NZ Top 40 Singles Chart, but peaked at number 27 on the NZ Hot Singles Chart.)	—	—	BPI: Silver	Ground Control
"Regardless" (with Raye)	2020	37	—	—	—	—	69	—	—	—	—	BPI: Silver	Euphoric Sad Songs
"Be Somebody" (with James Vincent McMorrow)	2021	—	—	—	—	—	— (Note: "Be Somebody" did not enter the Irish Singles Chart, but peaked at number 8 on the Irish Homegrown Top 20 chart.)	— (Note: "Be Somebody" did not enter the NZ Top 40 Singles Chart, but peaked at number 34 on the NZ Hot Singles Chart.)	—	—	—		Ground Control
"Straight from the Heart" (featuring Nørskov)	2021	—	—	—	—	—	—	—	— (Note: "Straight from the Heart" did not enter the NZ Top 40 Singles Chart, but peaked at number 35 on the NZ Hot Singles Chart.)	—	—		Ground Control
"So Sorry" (with Skream)	2021	—	—	—	—	—	—	—	—	—	—		Ground Control
"Jumper" (featuring Kareen Lomax)	2021	—	—	—	—	—	—	—	—	—	—		Ground Control
"Break My Heart" (Note: "Break My Heart" only appears on the deluxe edition of Rudim3ntal.)	2022	—	—	—	—	—	—	—	— (Note: "Break My Heart" did not enter the NZ Top 40 Singles Chart, but peaked at number 12 on the NZ Hot Singles Chart.)	*	—	BPI: Silver; RMNZ: Platinum	Rudim3ntal (Note: "Break My Heart" only appears on the deluxe edition of Rudim3ntal.)
"Dancing Is Healing" (with Charlotte Plank and Vibe Chemistry)	2023	5	—	—	—	—	14	—	— (Note: "Dancing Is Healing" did not enter the NZ Top 40 Singles Chart, but peaked at number 10 on the NZ Hot Singles Chart.)	*	—	BPI: Platinum	Rudim3ntal
"Die Young" (with Venbee)	2023	73	—	—	—	—	—	—	— (Note: "Die Young" did not enter the NZ Top 40 Singles Chart, but peaked at number 15 on the NZ Hot Singles Chart.)	*	—		Non-album singles
"Thunderstorm" (with Clipz featuring Deyaz)	2023	—	—	—	—	—	—	—	—	*	—		Non-album singles
"Waterslides" (with Tiësto and Absolutely)	2024	—	—	—	—	—	—	—	— (Note: "Waterslides" did not enter the NZ Top 40 Singles Chart, but peaked at number 22 on the NZ Hot Singles Chart.)	*	—		Non-album singles
"Green & Gold" (with Skepsis featuring Charlotte Plank and Riko Dan)	2024	29	—	—	—	—	—	—	— (Note: "Green & Gold" did not enter the NZ Top 40 Singles Chart, but peaked at number 16 on the NZ Hot Singles Chart.)	*	—	BPI: Gold	Rudim3ntal (Note: "Gone for the Night" only appears on the deluxe edition of Rudim3ntal.)
"Bring Me Joy" (featuring Karen Harding)	2024	63	—	—	—	—	—	—	— (Note: "Bring Me Joy" did not enter the NZ Top 40 Singles Chart, but peaked at number 21 on the NZ Hot Singles Chart.)	*	—	BPI: Silver	Rudim3ntal
"Gone for the Night" (Note: "Gone for the Night" only appears on the deluxe edition of Rudim3ntal.) (with Disrupta featuring Liam Bailey, BackRoad Gee, Scrufizzer and Shakes)	2024	—	—	—	—	—	—	—	— (Note: "Gone for the Night" did not enter the NZ Top 40 Singles Chart, but peaked at number 34 on the NZ Hot Singles Chart.)	*	—		Rudim3ntal
"Ram Pam" (featuring Mystic Marley and Flowdan)	2024	—	—	—	—	—	—	—	— (Note: "Ram Pam" did not enter the NZ Top 40 Singles Chart, but peaked at number 11 on the NZ Hot Singles Chart.)	*	—		Rudim3ntal
"The Feeling" (with 1991, Pnau and AR/CO)	2024	—	—	—	—	—	—	—	— (Note: "The Feeling" did not enter the NZ Top 40 Singles Chart, but peaked at number 13 on the NZ Hot Singles Chart.)	*	—		Rudim3ntal
"Vex" (with Skepsis featuring Mist and Popcaan)	2024	—	—	—	—	—	—	—	—	*	—		Rudim3ntal
"All I Know" (with Khalid)	2025	56	—	—	—	—	—	—	—	*	—		Rudim3ntal
"Back to Me" (with Jess Glynne)	2025	42	—	—	—	—	—	—	— (Note: "Back to Me" did not enter the NZ Top 40 Singles Chart, but peaked at number 35 on the NZ Hot Singles Chart.)	*	—		Rudim3ntal
"Nights Like These" (with Rag'n'Bone Man)	2025	65	—	—	—	—	—	—	—	*	—		Rudim3ntal
"Love You More"	2026	—	—	—	—	—	—	—	— (Note: "Love You More" did not enter the NZ Top 40 Singles Chart, but peaked at number 15 on the NZ Hot Singles Chart.)	*	—		Non-album singles
"Send Shots"	2026	—	—	—	—	—	—	—	— (Note: "Send Shots" did not enter the NZ Top 40 Singles Chart, but peaked at number 16 on the NZ Hot 40 Singles Chart.)	*	—		Non-album singles
"3 2 1" (with Chrystal)	2026	—	—	—	—	—	—	—	— (Note: "3 2 1" did not enter the NZ Top 40 Singles Chart, but peaked at number 27 on the NZ Hot 40 Singles Chart.)	*	—		Non-album singles
"—" denotes a recording that did not chart or was not released in that territory.
"*" denotes a chart that is discontinued.

=== As featured artist ===
Title	Year	Peak chart positions				Certifications	Album
Title	Year	UK	IRE	NL	NZ	Certifications	Album
"Stand By (#CWC19)" (Loryn featuring Rudimental)	2019	—	—	—	—		Non-album single
"Alibi" (Note: Only appears on the deluxe edition of Rudim3ntal.) (Ella Henderson featuring Rudimental)	2024	10	21	71	— (Note: "Alibi" did not enter the NZ Top 40 Singles Chart, but peaked at number 14 on the NZ Hot Singles Chart.)	BPI: Platinum; ARIA: Gold; RMNZ: Gold	Rudim3ntal (Note: Only appears on the deluxe edition of Rudim3ntal.)
"—" denotes a recording that did not chart or was not released in that territory.

=== Promotional singles ===
Title	Year	Peak chart positions					Certifications	Album
Title	Year	UK	AUS	IRE	NZ Hot	SCO	Certifications	Album
"Hell Could Freeze" (featuring Angel Haze)	2013	—	—	—	—	—		Home
"Pompeii" / "Waiting All Night" (with Bastille featuring Ella Eyre)	2014	21	—	42	—	24		Non-album single
"Love Ain't Just a Word" (featuring Anne-Marie and Dizzee Rascal)	2015	108	—	—	—	—		We the Generation
"We the Generation" (featuring Mahalia)	2015	—	—	—	—	—		We the Generation
"Healing" (featuring Joseph Angel)	2016	—	95	—	—	85		Non-album singles
"Trouble" (with Sub Focus featuring Chronixx and Maverick Sabre)	2017	—	—	—	—	—	RMNZ: Gold	Non-album singles
"No Fear" (with The Martinez Brothers featuring Donna Missal)	2017	—	—	—	—	—		Non-album singles
"Toast to Our Differences" (featuring Shungudzo, Protoje and Hak Baker)	2018	—	—	—	—	—		Toast to Our Differences
"They Don't Care About Us" (featuring Maverick Sabre and YEBBA)	2018	—	—	—	—	—		Toast to Our Differences
"Remember Their Names" (with MJ Cole featuring Josh Barry)	2021	—	—	—	36	—		Ground Control
"Instajets" (with The Game and D Double E featuring BackRoad Gee)	2021	—	—	—	—	—		Ground Control
"—" denotes a recording that did not chart or was not released in that territory.

== Remixes ==
Title	Year	Artist	Label	Album
"Closer"	2010	Natalie May	independent	/
"Lego House"	2011	Ed Sheeran	Warner	+
"Drunk"	2012	Ed Sheeran	Warner	+
"Around"	2012	Noir & Hayze	Defected	The Album
"Bada Bing"	2012	Benny Banks	679	Non-album remix
"Express Yourself"	2012	Labrinth	Syco	Electronic Earth
"Hush Little Baby" (featuring Ed Sheeran)	2012	Wretch 32	Ministry of Sound	Black and White
"Happier"	2012	Paper Crows	Warner	Build EP
"The Work"	2016	Saronde	Beating Heart Project	Beating Heart: Malawi
"Human"	2016	Rag'n'Bone Man	Sony	Human
"Fading"	2018	Alle Farben & ILIRA	Sony	Sticker on my Suitcase
"Don't Worry Bout Me"	2019	Zara Larsson	TEN Music Group	Non-album remix
"Ndi Konkuno"	2019	Faith Mussa	UMG	Kalilima
"All I Need"	2020	Jake Bugg	Sony	Saturday Night, Sunday Morning
"Need a Little Love"	2021	The Fratellis	Cooking Vinyl	Half Drunk Under a Full Moon
"Empower" (featuring Afronaut Zu, Tinyman and Ahnansé)	2021	Steam Down	UMG	Five Fruit
"Take Care Of Business"	2022	Nina Simone	UMG Recordings	Feeling Good: Her Greatest Hits And Remixes
