= List of awards and nominations received by Rudimental =

== BBC Radio 1Xtra Hot Summer Awards ==
Year	Nominee / work	Award	Result	Ref.
2013	"Right Here" (with Foxes)	Hottest Oap	Nominated	

== Berlin Music Video Awards ==
The Berlin Music Video Awards is international festival that puts filmmakers, musicians and the art behind music videos in the spotlight. Supporting both unknown and famous artists, it is primary a networking event for the video and music industries in Europe. Creators have the possibility to submit their works to various categories, such as Best Narrative, Animation, Song, Low Budget, Cinematography, Art Director, VFX, Director, Editor, Concept, Experimental, Production Company, Most Trashy, and Bizarre. The winners of each category compete for the Best Music Video and the final winner receives €3.000.

Year	Nominee / work	Award	Result	Ref.
2014	"Powerless" (with Becky Hill)	Best Editor	Nominated	
2024	"Dancing is Healing" (with Charlotte Plank and Vibe Chemistry)	Best Editor	Nominated	

== Brit Awards ==
The BRIT Awards are the British Phonographic Industry's annual pop music awards.

Year	Nominee / work	Award	Result	Ref.
2013	"Feel the Love" (with John Newman)	British Single of the Year	Nominated	
2014	"Waiting All Night" (with Ella Eyre)	British Single of the Year	Won	
2014	Home	British Album of the Year	Nominated	
2014	Themselves	Best British Group	Nominated	
2019	"These Days" (featuring Jess Glynne, Macklemore and Dan Caplen)	British Single of the Year	Nominated	
2019	"These Days" (featuring Jess Glynne, Macklemore and Dan Caplen)	British Video of the Year	Nominated	
2024	"Dancing Is Healing" (with Charlotte Plank and Vibe Chemistry)	Song of the Year	Pending	

== European Festival Awards ==
Year	Nominee / work	Award	Result	Ref.
2015	"Never Let You Go" (with Foy Vance)	Festival Anthem of the Year	Nominated	

== Global Awards ==
The Global Awards are given by the Global company to honour the stars of music, news & entertainment across genres in the UK and from around the world.

Year	Nominee / work	Award	Result	Ref.
2019	Themselves	Best British Artist or Group	Nominated	
2019	"These Days" (featuring Jess Glynne, Macklemore and Dan Caplen)	Most Played Song	Won	
2024	Themselves	Best Group	Pending	
2024	Themselves	Best Dance	Pending	
2024	"Dancing Is Healing"	Best Song	Pending	

== Hungarian Music Awards ==
The Hungarian Music Awards (Golden Giraffe Awards, before 2004) is an annual award ceremony held by the Hungarian music industry association Mahasz since 1992.

Year	Nominee / work	Award	Result	Ref.
2016	We the Generation	International Electronic Music Album of the Year	Nominated	

== International Dance Music Awards ==
The International Dance Music Awards were established in 1985. It is a part of the Winter Music Conference, a weeklong electronic music event held annually.

Year	Nominee / work	Award	Result	Ref.
2014	"Waiting All Night" (with Ella Eyre)	Best Dubstep/Drum & Bass Track	Nominated	
2014	Themselves	Best Dubstep/Drum & Bass DJ	Nominated	
2014	Themselves	Best Breakthrough Artist (Group)	Nominated	
2016	Themselves	Best Artist (Group)	Nominated	

== Ivor Novello Awards ==
The Ivor Novello Awards are awarded for songwriting and composing. The awards, named after the Cardiff born entertainer Ivor Novello, are presented annually in London by the British Academy of Songwriters, Composers and Authors (BASCA).

Year	Nominee / work	Award	Result	Ref.
2019	"These Days"	Most Performed Work	Nominated	

== MTV Europe Music Awards ==
The MTV Europe Music Awards was established in 1994 by MTV Europe to award the music videos from European and international artists.

Year	Nominee / work	Award	Result	Ref.
2013	Themselves	Best Push Act	Nominated	
2013	Themselves	Best New Act	Nominated	
2013	Themselves	Best UK & Ireland Act	Nominated	

== MOBO Awards ==
Year	Nominee / work	Award	Result	Ref.
2012	Themselves	Best Newcomer	Nominated	
2013	Home	Best Album	Won	
2013	Themselves	Best Male Act	Nominated	
2013	"Waiting All Night" (with Ella Eyre)	Best Song	Nominated	
2014	"Powerless" (with Becky Hill)	Best Video	Nominated	

== Mercury Prize ==
Year	Nominee / work	Award	Result	Ref.
2013	Home	Album of the Year	Nominated	

== Silver Clef Awards ==
Year	Nominee / work	Award	Result	Ref.
2018	Themselves	Innovation Award	Won	

== UK Music Video Awards ==
The UK Music Video Awards is an annual award ceremony founded in 2008 to recognise creativity, technical excellence and innovation in music videos and moving images for music.

Year	Nominee / work	Award	Result	Ref.
2012	"Feel the Love" (with John Newman)	Best Dance Video - UK	Nominated	
2013	"Waiting All Night" (with Ella Eyre)	Best Dance Video - UK	Nominated	
2013	"Not Giving In" (with John Newman & Alex Clare)	Best Dance Video - UK	Won	
2014	"Powerless" (with Becky Hill)	Best Urban Video - UK	Nominated	
2014	Live at Brixton Academy	Best Live Coverage	Nominated	
2015	"Never Let You Go" (with Foy Vance)	Best Colour Grade in a Video	Nominated	
2016	Live Acoustic Session	Best Live Coverage	Nominated	
2019	"Something About You"	Best Dance Video - UK	Nominated	
2021	"So Sorry" (with Skream)	Best Dance/Electronic Video - UK	Nominated	

== Urban Music Awards ==
The Urban Music Awards (UMA) is a hip-hop, R&B, dance and soul music awards ceremony launched by Jordan Kensington in 2003 and now held in several countries.

Year	Nominee / work	Award	Result	Ref.
2012	"Feel the Love"	Best Music Video	Won	
2013	Home	Best Album	Nominated	
2013	Themselves	Artist of the Year	Nominated	
2013	Themselves	Best Dance Act	Nominated	
2013	Themselves	Best Group	Nominated	
2015	Themselves	Best Group	Nominated	
2016	Themselves	Best Group	Nominated	
2017	Themselves	Best Group	Nominated	

== YouTube Music Awards ==
The YouTube Music Awards, abbreviated as the YTMA, is an inaugural music award show presented by YouTube.

Year	Nominee / work	Award	Result	Ref.
2013	Themselves	YouTube Breakthrough	Nominated	
