= Amir Amor =

British musician (born 1985)

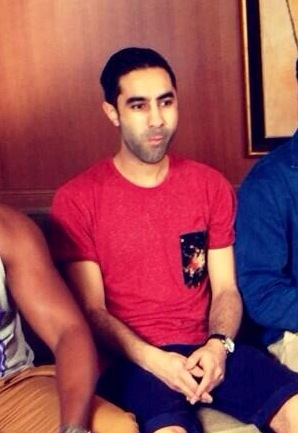
- Amor during an interview in 2013

Background information
- Also known as: Analog Kid
- Born: Amir Izadkhah; 23 March 1985 (age 41); Tehran, Iran
- Origin: London, England, UK
- Genres: Electronic; pop; hip-hop; alternative rock; dance; soul
- Occupations: Record producer; musician; singer; songwriter
- Instruments: Bass guitar; guitar; drums; keyboards; percussion; vocals
- Years active: 2002–present
- Labels: Asylum; Atlantic; Black Butter; 679; Major Toms
- Formerly of: Rudimental
- Website: amiramormusic.com

Amir Izadkhah (Persian: امیر ایزدخواه; born 23 March 1985), better known by his stage name Amir Amor, is an Iranian–English record producer, musician, singer and songwriter. From 2011 to 2022, he was a member of the drum and bass band Rudimental. Amor is the founder of London record label and recording studio Major Tom's. His production and writing credits include Sam Smith, Ed Sheeran, Charli XCX, Maxïmo Park, Peace, Yuck, Marina and the Diamonds, Wretch 32, Angel Haze and MNEK amongst many others. Through his work with Rudimental, he has won the 2014 Brit Award for Best Single of the Year, the Mobo Award for Best Album, and has achieved multiple platinum awards for record sales in multiple countries.

Amor was tipped as the "number one new producer to watch" by The Guardian, and listed by NME magazine as one of the "20 hottest producers in music right now". Some of the other names on the bill were Paul Epworth, Mark Ronson, Dr. Luke and Rick Rubin.

== Early life ==
Amor began life amidst the Iran–Iraq War in Tehran, Iran. The son of an air force Colonel and a high school science teacher, he spent his early years unable to enroll into school and escaping to shelters amidst regular bomb raids. In 1992, Amor, his mother and sister arrived in London separated from his father and brothers. Moving from spare room, to lodge, and at times, to the street. Unable to communicate in English, Amor and his sister were rejected by many schools. However, once placed, the lack of school experience that Amor had, spelt a difficult time fitting in, and staying in. He was often dismissed, preferring to wander and discover the deep corners of London for hours on his own. Amidst this ample spare time he discovered a cassette player with an accidental function – the ability to overdub. Experiments in beatboxing over tracks began.

Soon, his family was partially reunited and Amor's father and one brother rejoined the family. They were finally able to find their first home together. First in Ladbroke Grove, and then in Somers Town, with Amor beginning his educational trials at Gladstone Park, St Peters, and Edith Neville. With the family mostly together again, a roof over their heads, and a sense of stability emerging – Amir finally began to feel a sense of settling in. Learning to call Camden his stomping ground, and staying enrolled at his graduating school, Haverstock. Here, his growing community began to introduce him to a new culture – of hip hop, graffiti, pirate radio stations, and their potential. Amor learnt how to graffiti, latched onto pirate radio setups, honed in on record stores and quickly amassed a worthy cassette collection of hip hop, funk, soul, alternative rock and electronic music. Then at 14, a chance encounter with a music production software demo without a save function resulted in his first ever (accidentally) recorded production, "Jaws", a garage track that soon spread around his school and ended up selling a cassette.

== Career ==
=== Career beginnings ===
Soon after, driven by the potential, and his habit of discovery, Amor found himself inching into recording studios around Camden. Befriending staff and trying to satiate his widening curiosity. It was then when he found Tribal Tree, a studio and youth club teaching music skills to disadvantaged kids. Their quota was full, but hanging around landed him a space and the laying down of a foundation of skills. At this course, he learnt how to program beats – and heard of the idea that one could actually make a living from creating music. In these classes, recent graduate Plan B taught him his first chords, and program founder Kevin Osbourne lent him keys to his studio after hours. He soon ended up as a tutor at the youth club himself.

During the late nights in Osbourne's studio, Amor wrote and produced a demo EP, and on the suggestion of Osbourne, sent it into a songwriting competition run by The Prince's Trust. Amir won the competition and used the £2500 to buy his first computer, and although he did not yet know how to play them, a guitar and bass. With these, he would listen to Parliament-Funkadelic and Jimi Hendrix, playing the bass lines and teaching himself the guitar.

Amor partnered up with Plan B to produce his first album, Paint It Blacker: The Bootleg Album, a series of tracks of hip hop beats covering the likes of the Rolling Stones, Leonard Cohen and Radiohead. Amor's sensibility of merging live sounds with the electronic begins to solidify – and with this, Plan B was signed to 679 Records, and Amor began to get hired as a beat maker – programming for other producers across Europe. He also began touring as a session musician with a post-hardcore rock band, and in another as a bass player with live electronics. Plan B hired him again to score his first short film, Michelle. It is during this time that Amor reunited with his brother who stayed in Iran, Shahrokh Izadkhah, and found an alignment of interests. Shahrokh also happened to be a musician and guitarist, and co-founded the influential Persian rock band O-Hum. They kindle a relationship that began the workings of their company, Future Instruments.

In 2009, during a session with Little Boots, Amor convinced Nick Worthington, former A&R of XL Recordings and founder of 679, to come down. A conversation ended up in a partnership to open a studio, Major Toms. A space to curate and experiment with new work and artists – alongside working with the existing 679 roster. At Major Toms, Amor produced three albums in their first year, on top of his production and engineering one-offs. His artists were signed to Atlantic and Amor produced the likes of Sam Smith, Charli XCX, Maxïmo Park, Peace, Yuck, Marina and the Diamonds, Wretch 32 and Angel Haze. He also met MNEK, then a young aspiring producer and songwriter, to collaborate on songwriting – who moved into Major Toms.

=== 2011–2022: Rudimental ===
A turn arrived in 2011 when Atlantic threatened to cut both of Amor's developed and signed artists and under a major funding cut, Amor turned Major Toms into a commercial studio space. He also spoke with Worthington on expanding it into a record label.

On Worthington's advice, they sought out a small existing label, looking to produce and develop an existing roster instead of starting from the ground up. Worthington looked for a left-field dance record label called Black Butter Records, run by Henry Village – whose roster includes Gorgon City, Kidnap Kid and Rudimental.

At this time, Worthington also became Amor's manager, and a stream of tracks started coming through from Black Butter. A demo called "Feel the Love" featuring keys and a vocal is amongst them and sits on Amor's backlog for four months until he began working on developing and producing the track.

The funding cut continued, and Amor looked to secure a publishing deal in a hopeful attempt to further bolster Major Toms. He reached out and took his production of "Feel the Love" to RAM and Ministry of Sound, who turned it down, and then to Asylum Records, who turned up at Major Toms the next day with a contract to sign it as a one-off single.

Still never having met Rudimental or Henry Village face to face, Amor proposed a joint venture release and a naming confusion ensued – "Rudimental featuring Amir Amor" or "Rudimental and Amir Amor" are considered.

Both were considered too lengthy, and Amor agreed to keeping his name solely in the production and writing credits.

After this process, Rudimental come up to Major Toms and finally meet Amor for the first time. Coming together to session, Amor produced and wrote more songs for them, resulting in the tracks "Not Giving In" and "Spoons". The final touches were also added to Amor's production of "Feel the Love".

On 14 May 2012, "Feel the Love" was released and debuted at number one on the UK Singles Chart, giving Asylum its first number one single in its 41-year history. To this, Asylum came to Rudimental and Amor with an album deal, but under the requirement that Amor dedicated his production efforts to all of Rudimental's work. The band then invited him to join and heavy touring together ensued.

For Rudimental's live shows, Amor played bass, guitar and keyboards with an 11-piece live band. Guest vocalists, a brass section and live drums play Rudimental's fusion of electronic and live instruments. Amor also worked with Beanie, Bridgette Amofah and MNEK along the way.

Debuting their first live show, at BBC Hackney Weekend, Rudimental became the most shared act, ahead of the likes of Kanye West. BBC proclaimed them the "Festival Band of the Summer" and the band headlined festivals across six continents. In 2013, they also toured with Prodigy and the Stone Roses.

Also in 2013, Amor graduated with a bachelor's degree in Commercial Music from the University of Westminster.

Rudimental's second studio album We the Generation was released in October 2015, and album three then began production – with collaborators including Bobby Womack, George Clinton, DJ Premier, Nas, Nile Rodgers and Max Romeo.

Today, Amor continues his production work as Amir Amor; heads up Major Toms; and furthers the development of "Future Instruments", a company focused on developing tools for intuitive creation.

On 21 October 2022, Rudimental posted a tweet captioned "A new era". The image attached to the tweet had three of the group members pictured, implying Amir left the group in 2022.

== Awards ==
Amor's work with Rudimental has been nominated for a Mercury Prize in 2013, and has won several awards including the 2014 Brit Award for Best Single of the Year for "Waiting All Night" and the Mobo Award for Best Album. It has also received multiple nominations at the MTV Europe Music Awards and has achieved multiple platinum awards for record sales in multiple countries including in the United Kingdom and Australia.
