= 2024 Global Awards =

Edition of award ceremony

- Date: 22 March 2024
- Country: United Kingdom
- Most awards: Calvin Harris (3); RAYE (3)

Television/radio coverage
- Network: Capital FM; Capital XTRA; Heart FM; Radio X Smooth Radio

The 2024 Global Awards ceremony was held on Friday, 22 March 2024 live on-air through the Global radio stations Capital FM, Capital XTRA, Heart FM, Radio X and Smooth Radio.

== Nominees and winners ==
The list of nominees was announced in March 2024 through the Global networks. All nominees are listed below, and the winners are listed in bold.

Best Song	Most Played Song
**Cassö, Raye, D-Block Europe – "Prada"**; Anne-Marie, Shania Twain – "Unhealthy"; Calvin Harris, Ellie Goulding – "Miracle"; Dave, Central Cee – "Sprinter"; Doja Cat – "Paint the Town Red"; Dua Lipa – "Dance the Night"; Ed Sheeran – "Eyes Closed"; J Hus – "Who Told You"; Jack Harlow – "Lovin on Me"; Jazzy – "Giving Me"; Kenya Grace – "Strangers"; Kylie Minogue – "Padam Padam"; Lewis Capaldi – "Wish You the Best"; Miley Cyrus – "Flowers"; Olivia Rodrigo – "Vampire"; PinkPantheress – "Boy's a Liar"; Rudimental – "Dancing Is Healing"; Tate McRae – "Greedy"; Taylor Swift – "Karma"; Tom Grennan – "How Does It Feel"; Zara Larsson – "Can't Tame Her"	**Calvin Harris, Ellie Goulding – "Miracle"**
Global Legend	Rising Star Award
**Elton John**; ABBA; Barry Manilow; Billy Joel; Bruce Springsteen; Cher; Dolly Parton; Elvis Presley; George Michael; Lionel Richie; Madonna; Michael Jackson; Queen; Rod Stewart; Take That; The Rolling Stones; Tina Turner	**Tate McRae**; AntsLive; Caity Baser; Jazzy; Kenya Grace; Noah Kahan; Teddy Swims; Tyla; Venbee
Best Podcast	Best Group
**My Therapist Ghosted Me**; The News Agents; The News Agents – USA; Filthy Ritual; Rachel Johnson’s Difficult Women; For The Many; Full Disclosure; The Rest Is Politics; Big Fish with Spencer Matthews; ZOE Science & Nutrition; The Wittering Whitehalls; We Can Be Weirdos	**Take That**; Busted; Foo Fighters; Jonas Brothers; Nothing but Thieves; Rudimental
Best Male	Best Female
**Calvin Harris**; Dave; David Guetta; Drake; Ed Sheeran; Harry Styles; Jax Jones; Joel Corry; Stormzy; The Weeknd; Tom Grennan	**Taylor Swift**; Anne-Marie; Beyoncé; Doja Cat; Dua Lipa; Leigh-Anne Pinnock; Miley Cyrus; Olivia Rodrigo; RAYE; Tate McRae; Zara Larsson
Best Classical Artist	Best British Act
**Anna Lapwood**; Abel Selaocoe; Malakai Bayoh; Lise Davidsen; Yunchan Lim	**RAYE**; Becky Hill; Calvin Harris; Central Cee; Dave; Dua Lipa; Ed Sheeran; Leigh-Anne; Lewis Capaldi; Tom Grennan
Best RnB or Hip Hop	Best Dance
**Central Cee**; Beyoncé; Chris Brown; D-Block Europe; Dave; Doja Cat; Drake; J Hus; RAYE; SZA	**Calvin Harris**; Becky Hill; Chase & Status; David Guetta; Fred Again; James Hype; Jazzy; Rudimental; Venbee
Best Rock and Indie	Best Pop
**Foo Fighters**; Blink-182; Blur; Noel Gallagher's High Flying Birds; Nothing but Thieves	**RAYE**; Anne-Marie; Ed Sheeran; Harry Styles; Jonas Brothers; Leigh-Anne; Miley Cyrus; Olivia Rodrigo; Tate McRae; Taylor Swift; Zara Larsson
Best Fans (Public vote)
**Jung Kook**; Ariana Grande; Beyoncé; Billie Eilish; Doja Cat; Harry Styles; Ice Spice; Olivia Rodrigo; RAYE; Sabrina Carpenter; Taylor Swift
