= Brit Awards 2014 =

British music awards ceremony

- Date: 19 February 2014
- Venue: The O2 Arena
- Hosted by: James Corden

Highlights
- Most awards: Arctic Monkeys and One Direction (2)
- Most nominations: Ellie Goulding (5)

Television/radio coverage
- Network: ITV; YouTube
- Viewership: 4.56 million

Brit Awards 2014 was held on 19 February 2014. It was the 34th edition of the British Phonographic Industry's annual pop Brit Awards. The awards ceremony was held at The O2 Arena in London and was presented by James Corden for the fourth consecutive year. Leading the nominations was Ellie Goulding with five nominations. Arctic Monkeys and One Direction both won the most awards, winning two awards each. For the first time ever, a backstage livestream was broadcast on the internet, via YouTube. The stream was hosted by internet vloggers Daniel Howell and Phil Lester, with guests including One Direction and Ellie Goulding. 67-year-old David Bowie became the oldest winner to date of the British Male Solo Artist award.

A new glossy black finish design statue designed by fashion designer Philip Treacy was presented for the first time.

== Statuette design ==
The statuette for the 2014 BRIT Awards was designed by Irish milliner Philip Treacy. Taking the form of Britannia (the national personification of Britain), the trophy has been redesigned by various artists since the BRIT Awards revamp in 2011. Treacy stated that music has always been his inspiration, with the 2014 trophy being inspired by "a uniquely British genre of music, Punk." It was unveiled on 28 November 2013. The statuette has a glossy black finish, with a black and white circular hat that represents a mohawk, which sits atop the helmet at the apex of the trophy.

== Performances ==
=== The Brits Are Coming: Nominations Launch Party ===
Nick Grimshaw hosted the launch show inside the ITV Studios in London on Thursday 9 January.

| Artist(s) | Song(s) | UK Singles Chart reaction |
|---|---|---|
| Tinie Tempah | "Children of the Sun" "Lover Not a Fighter" | did not chart 42 (+78) |
| Pixie Lott | "Nasty" | 9 (debut) |
| Sam Smith | "Money on My Mind" | 1 (debut) |
| Rudimental | "Not Giving In" | 84 (−17) |

=== Main show performances ===
The following performances took place during the live broadcast on 19 February 2014.

| Artist(s) | Song(s) | UK Singles Chart reaction | UK Albums Chart reaction |
|---|---|---|---|
| Arctic Monkeys | "R U Mine?" | 55 (re-entry) | AM – 2 (+11); Whatever People Say I Am, That's What I'm Not – 40 (+71); Favourite Worst Nightmare – 84 (re-entry) |
| Katy Perry | "Dark Horse" | 6 (+4) | Prism – 27 (+10) |
| Bruno Mars | "Treasure" | 61 (+99) | Unorthodox Jukebox – 14 (+16); Doo-Wops & Hooligans – 56 (+61) |
| Beyoncé | "XO" | 23 (+26) | Beyoncé – 7 (−4) |
| Disclosure; Lorde; Aluna Francis | "Royals" "White Noise" | 36 (+7); 67 (re-entry) | Disclosure; Settle – 3 (+29) Lorde; Pure Heroine – 9 (+3) |
| Ellie Goulding | "I Need Your Love" "Burn" | did not chart 35 (+18) | Halcyon – 4 (−2) |
| Bastille; Rudimental; Ella Eyre | "Pompeii" "Waiting All Night" | 20 (+41); 42 (+64) | Bastille; Bad Blood – 1 (+9) Rudimental; Home – 5 (+14) |
| Pharrell Williams; Nile Rodgers | "Get Lucky" "Good Times" "Happy" | 47 (+16) did not chart 2 (+1) | Random Access Memories – 36 (+78) |

Select performances were made available for purchase on iTunes following the ceremony, and "Pompeii/Waiting All Night" by Bastille, Rudimental and Ella Eyre debuted at number 21 on the UK Singles Chart, whilst Lorde and Disclosure's "White Noise/Royals" debuted at number 72.

== Winners and nominees ==
| British Album of the Year (presented by Emeli Sandé) | British Producer of the Year |
|---|---|
| Arctic Monkeys – AM; Bastille – Bad Blood; David Bowie – The Next Day; Disclosure – Settle; Rudimental – Home | Flood and Alan Moulder; Ethan Johns; Paul Epworth |
| British Single of the Year (presented by Katy Perry) | British Video of the Year (presented by Jimmy Carr) |
| Rudimental featuring Ella Eyre – "Waiting All Night"; Bastille – "Pompeii"; Calvin Harris featuring Ellie Goulding – "I Need Your Love"; Disclosure featuring AlunaGeorge – "White Noise"; Ellie Goulding – "Burn"; John Newman – "Love Me Again"; Naughty Boy featuring Sam Smith – "La La La"; Olly Murs – "Dear Darlin'"; One Direction – "One Way or Another (Teenage Kicks)"; Passenger – "Let Her Go" | One Direction – "Best Song Ever"; Calvin Harris featuring Ellie Goulding – "I Need Your Love"; Ellie Goulding – "Burn"; John Newman – "Love Me Again"; Naughty Boy featuring Sam Smith – "La La La" |
| British Male Solo Artist (presented by Noel Gallagher) | British Female Solo Artist (presented by Prince and 3rdeyegirl) |
| David Bowie (collected by Kate Moss); Jake Bugg; James Blake; John Newman; Tom Odell | Ellie Goulding; Birdy; Jessie J; Laura Marling; Laura Mvula |
| British Group (presented by Lily Allen) | British Breakthrough Act (presented by Tinie Tempah and Fearne Cotton) |
| Arctic Monkeys; Bastille; Disclosure; One Direction; Rudimental | Bastille; Disclosure; Laura Mvula; London Grammar; Tom Odell |
| International Male Solo Artist (presented by Pharrell Williams and Kylie Minogue) | International Female Solo Artist (presented by Nick Grimshaw) |
| Bruno Mars; Drake; Eminem; John Grant; Justin Timberlake | Lorde; Janelle Monáe; Katy Perry; Lady Gaga; Pink |
| International Group (presented by Cesc Fàbregas and Nicole Scherzinger) | Critics' Choice Award |
| Daft Punk (collected by Nile Rodgers); Arcade Fire; Haim; Kings of Leon; Macklemore & Ryan Lewis | Sam Smith; Ella Eyre; Chlöe Howl |
| Global Success Award (presented by Rosie Huntington-Whiteley) | Icon Award (presented by Rod Stewart) |
| One Direction | Elton John |

== Multiple nominations and awards ==
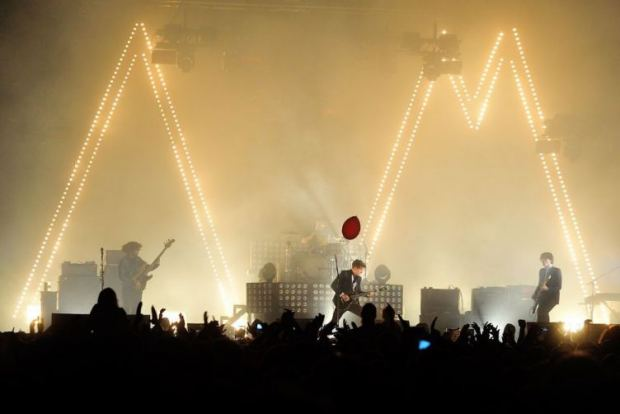
Two-time winner Arctic Monkeys

Artists that received multiple nominations
| Nominations | Artist |
|---|---|
| 5 | Ellie Goulding |
| 4 (2) | Bastille |
| 4 (2) | Disclosure |
| 3 (4) | John Newman |
| 3 (4) | One Direction |
| 3 (4) | Rudimental |
| 3 (4) | Sam Smith |
| 2 (6) | Arctic Monkeys |
| 2 (6) | Calvin Harris |
| 2 (6) | David Bowie |
| 2 (6) | Laura Mvula |
| 2 (6) | Naughty Boy |
| 2 (6) | Tom Odell |

Artists that received multiple awards
| Awards | Artist |
|---|---|
| 2 | Arctic Monkeys |

== Brit Awards 2014 album ==
Brit Awards 2014

Compilation album / Box set by Various Artists
- Released: 31 January 2014
- Label: UMTV

Various Artists chronology
| ''Brit Awards 2014'' (2014) | Brit Awards 2015 (2015) |

The Brit Awards 2014 is a compilation and box set which includes the "62 biggest tracks from the past year". The box set has three discs with a total of sixty-two songs by various artists.

=== Track listing ===
The set has three discs; the first disc includes twenty-one songs, the second disc includes twenty songs and the third disc includes twenty-one songs. Sam Smith, Ellie Goulding and Calvin Harris are the only artists to have more than one song in the album.

Brit Awards 2014 – disc 1
| No. | Title | Artist(s) | Length |
|---|---|---|---|
| 1. | "Waiting All Night" | Rudimental featuring Ella Eyre | 3:34 |
| 2. | "Roar" | Katy Perry | 3:43 |
| 3. | "Berzerk" | Eminem | 3:59 |
| 4. | "Pompeii" | Bastille | 3:34 |
| 5. | "Let Her Go" | Passenger | 4:11 |
| 6. | "Burn" | Ellie Goulding | 3:52 |
| 7. | "La La La" | Naughty Boy featuring Sam Smith | 3:40 |
| 8. | "Thrift Shop" | Macklemore & Ryan Lewis featuring Wanz | 3:58 |
| 9. | "Counting Stars" | OneRepublic | 4:17 |
| 10. | "Go Gentle" | Robbie Williams | 3:40 |
| 11. | "Wake Me Up" | Avicii featuring Aloe Blacc | 4:09 |
| 12. | "Applause" | Lady Gaga | 3:32 |
| 13. | "Wild" | Jessie J featuring Big Sean & Dizzee Rascal | 3:54 |
| 14. | "Just Give Me a Reason" | P!nk featuring Nate Ruess | 4:03 |
| 15. | "Hold On, We're Going Home" | Drake featuring Majid Jordan | 3:48 |
| 16. | "Animals" | Martin Garrix | 2:46 |
| 17. | "Feel This Moment" | Pitbull featuring Christina Aguilera | 3:19 |
| 18. | "I Need Your Love" | Calvin Harris featuring Ellie Goulding | 3:45 |
| 19. | "You're Nobody 'til Somebody Loves You" | James Arthur | 3:21 |
| 20. | "Grow Old with Me" | Tom Odell | 3:05 |
| 21. | "Best Song Ever" | One Direction | 3:24 |

Brit Awards 2014 – disc 2
| No. | Title | Artist(s) | Length |
|---|---|---|---|
| 1. | "Do I Wanna Know?" | Arctic Monkeys | 4:34 |
| 2. | "White Noise" | Disclosure featuring AlunaGeorge | 3:38 |
| 3. | "Love Me Again" | John Newman | 3:36 |
| 4. | "Strong" | London Grammar | 3:59 |
| 5. | "Where Are We Now?" | David Bowie | 4:10 |
| 6. | "Reflektor" | Arcade Fire | 5:01 |
| 7. | "Retrograde" | James Blake | 3:44 |
| 8. | "The Wire" | Haim | 4:06 |
| 9. | "Chocolate" | The 1975 | 3:46 |
| 10. | "Lost & Not Found" | Chase & Status featuring Louis M^ttrs | 3:58 |
| 11. | "Lightning Bolt" | Jake Bugg | 2:25 |
| 12. | "Wings" | Birdy | 3:49 |
| 13. | "Indian Summer" | Stereophonics | 4:27 |
| 14. | "Black Chandelier" | Biffy Clyro | 3:45 |
| 15. | "High Hopes" | Kodaline | 3:50 |
| 16. | "Bonfire Heart" | James Blunt | 3:58 |
| 17. | "Antenna" | Fuse ODG | 3:04 |
| 18. | "Booyah" | Showtek featuring We Are Loud & Sonny Wilson | 3:37 |
| 19. | "Get Up (Rattle)" | Bingo Players featuring Far East Movement | 2:46 |
| 20. | "Children Of The Sun" | Tinie Tempah featuring John Martin | 3:53 |

Brit Awards 2014 – disc 3
| No. | Title | Artist(s) | Length |
|---|---|---|---|
| 1. | "Get Lucky" | Daft Punk featuring Pharrell Williams & Nile Rodgers | 4:09 |
| 2. | "Treasure" | Bruno Mars | 2:57 |
| 3. | "Royals" | Lorde | 3:10 |
| 4. | "Blurred Lines" | Robin Thicke featuring Pharrell Williams | 3:51 |
| 5. | "We Can't Stop" | Miley Cyrus | 3:51 |
| 6. | "Talk Dirty" | Jason Derulo featuring 2 Chainz | 2:57 |
| 7. | "Scream & Shout" | will.i.am featuring Britney Spears | 4:14 |
| 8. | "Dear Darlin'" | Olly Murs | 3:26 |
| 9. | "What About Us" | The Saturdays featuring Sean Paul | 3:42 |
| 10. | "Dance Apocalyptic" | Janelle Monáe | 3:26 |
| 11. | "Look Right Through" | Storm Queen | 2:28 |
| 12. | "Summertime Sadness" | Lana Del Rey vs Cédric Gervais | 3:36 |
| 13. | "I Love It" | Icona Pop featuring Charli XCX | 2:35 |
| 14. | "Hey Porsche" | Nelly | 3:29 |
| 15. | "Eat, Sleep, Rave, Repeat" | Fatboy Slim & Riva Starr featuring Beardyman vs Calvin Harris | 4:43 |
| 16. | "Need U (100%)" | Duke Dumont featuring A*M*E | 2:55 |
| 17. | "Sonnentanz (Sun Don't Shine)" | Klangkarussell featuring Will Heard | 3:59 |
| 18. | "So Good to Me" | Chris Malinchak | 2:40 |
| 19. | "Green Garden" | Laura Mvula | 4:10 |
| 20. | "Lay Me Down" | Sam Smith | 3:22 |
| 21. | "Somewhere Only We Know" | Lily Allen | 3:30 |

=== Weekly charts ===
| Chart (2014) | Peak position |
|---|---|
| Irish Compilation Albums | 4 |
| UK Compilation Albums | 1 |
