= Rumour Mill =

Single by Rudimental featuring Anne-Marie and Will Heard

from the album We the Generation
- Released: 28 August 2015
- Recorded: 2015
- Genre: Deep house; UK garage
- Length: 4:03
- Label: Asylum; Atlantic
- Songwriters: Rudimental; Uzo Emenike; Will Heard; Jess Glynne
- Producer: Rudimental

Rudimental singles chronology
"I Will for Love" (2015)	"Rumour Mill" (2015)	"Lay It All on Me" (2015)

Anne-Marie singles chronology
"Gemini" (2015)	"Rumour Mill" (2015)	"Boy" (2015)

Will Heard singles chronology
"I Will for Love" (2015)	"Rumour Mill" (2015)	"Anywhere" (2016)

"Rumour Mill" is a song by British drum and bass band Rudimental. It features vocals from English singers Anne-Marie and Will Heard. The song was recorded for Rudimental's second album, We the Generation and was released as the album's fourth single on 28 August 2015.

== Commercial performance ==
The song reached number 67 on the UK Singles Chart for week ending 4 July 2015.

== Charts ==
Chart (2015–16)	Peak position
Australia (ARIA)	68
Belgium (Ultratip Bubbling Under Flanders)	13
Scotland Singles (OCC)	46
UK Singles (OCC)	67
UK Dance (OCC)	18

== Certifications ==
Region	Certification	Certified units/sales
New Zealand (RMNZ)	Gold	15,000^{‡}
Poland (ZPAV)	Gold	25,000^{‡}
United Kingdom (BPI)	Silver	200,000^{‡}
^{‡} Sales+streaming figures based on certification alone.
