= Bloodstream (Ed Sheeran song) =

2014 song by Ed Sheeran

Song by Ed Sheeran

from the album ×
- Released: 17 June 2014
- Studio: Shangri-La (Malibu, California)
- Length: 4:59
- Label: Asylum; Atlantic
- Songwriters: Ed Sheeran; Johnny McDaid; Gary Lightbody; Piers Agget; Amir Amor; Kesi Dryden; Leon Rolle
- Producer: Rick Rubin

"Bloodstream" is a song recorded by English singer-songwriter Ed Sheeran from his second studio album, × (2014). It was written by Sheeran, Rudimental, and Snow Patrol members Johnny McDaid and Gary Lightbody, and produced by Rick Rubin.

The song was released as an "instant grat" digital download to the iTunes Store on 17 June 2014, serving as the fourth of seven promotional singles from ×. It entered the UK Singles Chart at number 81 and rose to number 60.

In December 2014, "Bloodstream" was remixed by Rudimental. This version of the song was released on 29 March 2015 as a joint single between Sheeran and Rudimental, serving as the fourth single from × and the lead single from Rudimental's second studio album, We the Generation (2015). This remix peaked at number 2 on the UK Singles Chart.

== Background ==
"Bloodstream" was written by Sheeran, Rudimental, and Snow Patrol members – Johnny McDaid and Gary Lightbody, and produced by Rick Rubin at Shangri-La in Malibu, California. The song is about Sheeran taking MDMA during a wedding celebration in Ibiza. He claims that during the experience he "fell in love with a beanbag" and that "[he] felt anxiety, [he] felt love, [he] felt warm, [he] felt a bit weird". Sheeran made a live PA to perform the song during Rudimental's set at Glastonbury on 27 June 2014.

== Charts ==
Chart (2014)	Peak position
Australia (ARIA)	7
Belgium (Ultratop 50 Flanders)	48
Belgium (Ultratop 50 Wallonia)	47
Canada Hot 100 (Billboard)	60
Denmark (Tracklisten)	7
Euro Digital Songs (Billboard)	6
Finland (Finland Digital Songs)	7
France (SNEP)	39
Hungary (Single Top 40)	16
Ireland (IRMA)	57
Netherlands (Single Top 100)	44
Spain (Promusicae)	42
Sweden (Sweden Digital Songs)	6
UK Singles (Official Charts)	60
US Bubbling Under Hot 100 (Billboard)	10
US Digital Song Sales (Billboard)	42

== Certifications ==
Region	Certification	Certified units/sales
Canada (Music Canada)	Gold	40,000^{‡}
Italy (FIMI)	Gold	25,000^{‡}
^{‡} Sales+streaming figures based on certification alone.

== Ed Sheeran and Rudimental version ==
"Bloodstream"

Single by Ed Sheeran and Rudimental

from the album × and We the Generation
- Released: 11 February 2015
- Recorded: December 2014
- Genre: Drum and bass
- Length: 5:09 (album version); 3:39 (radio edit)
- Label: Asylum; Atlantic
- Songwriters: Ed Sheeran; Johnny McDaid; Gary Lightbody; Rudimental
- Producer: Rudimental

Ed Sheeran singles chronology
"Make It Rain" (2014)	"Bloodstream" (2015)	"Photograph" (2015)

Rudimental singles chronology
"Give You Up" (2014)	"Bloodstream" (2015)	"Never Let You Go" (2015)

At the BBC Music Awards on 11 December 2014, it was revealed by Sheeran that a remixed version of "Bloodstream" would serve as the fourth single from ×. He told MTV News, "I've done a song with Rudimental that is actually a song on my album. We've just re-done it and it's heavy, it's going to be great. They've re-done it, it's going to be sort of their first single off their new record...It's really good."

=== Background ===
In an interview with The Sun, regarding the collaboration, Rudimental's DJ Locksmith said, "We were working in LA and [Sheeran] rocked up to our studio with The Game and Ellie Goulding. We made four tracks and revisited one this year to give it a Rudimental spin. We've known Ed for years. I remember when we first saw him getting noticed by everyone, he gave us one of his tracks to remix and he said it was one of the best remixes he'd ever had. We'd never recorded with him before, but we kept the connection and he's a massive name now. The song is so sick, so insane. We can't wait to show it to people."

The reworked song's audio was uploaded on 11 February and the song was released on 29 March.

=== Music video ===
A music video featuring actor Ray Liotta was released on 23 March 2015. The video is directed by Emil Nava.

=== Live performances ===
Sheeran performed "Bloodstream" on 13 April 2015 on the results show of the second series of The X Factor in New Zealand.

=== Track listing ===
Digital download
No.	Title	Length
1.	"Bloodstream" (with Rudimental)	5:08
2.	"I Will Take You Home"	3:57
Total length:		9:05

Digital download – Chris Lorenzo remix
No.	Title	Length
1.	"Bloodstream" (Chris Lorenzo Remix)	6:24

Digital download – Arty remix
No.	Title	Length
1.	"Bloodstream" (Arty Remix)	6:35

Digital download – radio edit
No.	Title	Length
1.	"Bloodstream" (radio edit)	3:39

=== Charts and certifications ===
==== Weekly charts ====
Chart (2015)	Peak position
Belgium (Ultratip Bubbling Under Flanders)	32
Hungary (Single Top 40)	38
Ireland (IRMA)	13
Mexico (Billboard Ingles Airplay)	29
Netherlands (Single Top 100)	98
New Zealand (Recorded Music NZ)	2
Scottish Singles Sales (Official Charts)	2
UK Singles (Official Charts)	2

==== Year-end charts ====
Chart (2015)	Position
Australia (ARIA)	78
New Zealand (Recorded Music NZ)	37
UK Singles (Official Charts Company)	33

==== Certifications ====
Region	Certification	Certified units/sales
Australia (ARIA)	2× Platinum	140,000^{‡}
Canada (Music Canada)	Platinum	80,000^{‡}
Denmark (IFPI Danmark)	Platinum	90,000^{‡}
New Zealand (RMNZ)	3× Platinum	90,000^{‡}
United Kingdom (BPI)	3× Platinum	1,800,000^{‡}
United States (RIAA)	Gold	500,000^{‡}
^{‡} Sales+streaming figures based on certification alone.

=== Release history ===
Region	Date	Format	Label
United Kingdom	9 March 2015	Mainstream radio	
Ireland	27 March 2015	Digital download	Asylum; Atlantic
United Kingdom	29 March 2015	Digital download	Asylum; Atlantic
Australia	30 March 2015	Digital download	Asylum; Atlantic
New Zealand	30 March 2015	Digital download	Asylum; Atlantic
Italy	10 April 2015	Radio Airplay	Asylum; Atlantic
