= Offrami =

Music producer and artist

- Born: Rami Eid; March 12, 1994 (age 32); Abu Dhabi, United Arab Emirates
- Other name: RAMI
- Citizenship: American; Lebanese
- Occupations: Record producer; songwriter; DJ; businessman
- Years active: 2016–present
- Musical career
- Origin: Beirut, Lebanon
- Genres: Tropical house; EDM; hip hop; instrumental
- Labels: lostboy.la; Atlantic Records; Sony Music Records; Black Butter Records; Disco:Wax; Armada Music
- Website: offrami.com

Rami Eid, known professionally as offrami, is a music producer from Lebanon who resides in Los Angeles. offrami began his career by going under the artist name "RAMI", accumulating over eight hundred thousand monthly listeners on Spotify. In 2019, he decided to change his official artist name from RAMI to offrami forcing him to change his artist account on all streaming platforms. He currently has over 1.2 million monthly listeners on Spotify under the name offrami.

== Career ==
=== Early life ===
Rami Eid was born on March 12, 1994, in Abu Dhabi, United Arab Emirates and is of Lebanese descent. He spent the majority of his youth in Beirut before moving to Florida to pursue his passion of making music. He began attending Full Sail University, one of the top ranked colleges for music production in the US, and majored in Recording Arts. Right after graduating, offrami took up an internship at a recording studio in Glenwood, California called Glenwood Place Studios where he was able to get a first-hand view of well-known artists and their producers work. The artists included Lil Wayne, Bruno Mars, Burna Boy, and Pharrell Williams. This fueled his passion for music and set him on the path of turning his hobby of music production into a full-time career.

== 2016 ==
offrami started off his career as a remix-artist in an attempt to prove himself and build an audience before launching any originals. His rise to fame began with his remix of Arizona's song 'I Was Wrong' reaching No. 1 on Hype Machine and racking over seven million plays on SoundCloud. His first remix's success allowed him to receive additional remix requests by artists taking on another track shortly after called 'Swim' by Cape Cub under the label Disco:Wax - Sony Norde. 'Swim' racked over twenty million plays on Spotify and was offrami's second song to reach No. 1 on Hype Machine. 2016 included another remix by offrami for MaJLo's song 'Another Day' which racked over fifteen million plays on Spotify. After seeing his remixes successes, offrami decided to end the year by releasing an original along with artist Natio, 'Breathing', under the label Armada Music.

== 2017 ==
After releasing his first original, offrami enjoyed the process of creating his own work. He began the year by signing with Disco:Wax - Sony Norde. During this year offrami released 4 original songs, with each song racking over four million plays on Spotify. offrami ended the year with an officially signed remix by Island Records for Nick Jonas's single 'Find You'.

== 2018 ==
offrami started the year with two more official remixes signed by Island Records, Bishop Briggs' Dream and Youngr's LIT. Continuing with his original work, he teamed up with Colton Avery and CASP:R under Disco:Wax - Sony Norde to release 'Fireproof'. Throughout 2018 offrami pursued a variety of opportunities, pushing himself to explore different sounds of his own. His music style evolved from tropical house to a blend of electronic and urban feel good sounds. He ended the year with releasing his first Dancehall pop original song 'Santa Monica' with artist Hoosh under the label Lowly Palace.

== 2019 ==
2019 marked offrami's most independent and original year thus far.

== Discography ==
=== Originals ===
Year	Title	Primary Artist(s)	Featuring Artist(s)	Label(s)
2016	Breathing	offrami, Natio	F R A N C I S	Armada
2017	Losing You	offrami, CASP:R	Mougleta	Disco:Wax
2017	Our Hearts	offrami	Tom Bailey	Disco:Wax
2017	Far From Home	offrami	Mougleta	Disco:Wax
2017	Foolish	offrami, Hoosh	N/A	Disco:Wax
2018	Fireproof	offrami, CASP:R	Colton Avery	Disco:Wax
2018	Santa Monica	offrami, Hoosh	N/A	Lowly
2019	Ro Dada	offrami	TeeDeeVee	offrami (Independent)
2019	Messi	offrami	TeeDeeVee	offrami (Independent)
2019	Let Me Go	offrami	N/A	offrami (Independent)
2019	Kumbaye	offrami	Rotex	offrami (Independent)
2019	How Did We Get Here	offrami	N/A	offrami (Independent)
2019	Ella Es Asi	offrami, Sam Smyers	HSTN	offrami (Independent)
2019	Call The Police	offrami, Valleyz	Rotex	offrami (Independent)
2019	Pon Your Face	offrami, Skales	N/A	lostboy.la
2019	HOEM	offrami, Hoosh	N/A	lostboy.la

=== Remixes ===
Year	Title	Original Artist(s)	Remixer(s)	Label(s)
2016	Swim	Cape Cub	offrami	Disco:Wax, Black Butter
2016	Another Day	Majlo	offrami	Disco:Wax
2016	I Was Wrong	ARIZONA	offrami, Jiinio	Atlantic Records
2017	Find You	Nick Jonas	offrami	Island Records
2018	L.I.T	Youngr	offrami	Island Records
2018	Dream	Bishop Briggs	offrami	Island Records
2018	Antidote	Kiso	offrami	N/A
2018	Rivers	Allman Brown	offrami	N/A
