= Ground Control (album) =

Studio album by Rudimental
- Released: 3 September 2021
- Genre: House
- Length: 56:54
- Label: Asylum; Atlantic; Major Tom's
- Producer: Rudimental; Karma Kid; Conor Bellis; MJ Cole; Future Cut; Jay Weathers; Skream; Redlight; Cadenza; 2fox

Rudimental chronology
Toast to Our Differences (2019)	Ground Control (2021)	Rudim3ntal (2025)

Singles from Ground Control
- 1. "Krazy" Released: 5 March 2020; 2. "Come Over" Released: 28 August 2020; 3. "Be the One" Released: 10 December 2020; 4. "Be Somebody" Released: 12 March 2021; 5. "Straight from the Heart" Released: 18 June 2021; 6. "So Sorry" Released: 13 July 2021

Professional ratings
Review scores
Source	Rating
The Arts Desk	3/5 stars
Clash	7/10

Ground Control is the fourth studio album by English drum and bass band Rudimental, released on 3 September 2021 through Asylum Records. It is their final album to feature Amir Amor, who left the band in October 2022.

== Background and composition ==
In an interview with HMV and Rudimental member Piers Aggett, he talked about the writing process of Ground Control whilst in lockdown during the COVID-19 pandemic and stated that the album material started surfacing even before their third album Toast to Our Differences was released. Aggett said, "COVID was actually a bit of a blessing for us. Normally we tour all the time, certainly all summer, and it gave us a summer at home for the first time in a long time. We made the whole album in lockdown. A lot of the songs were actually written in 2018." He elaborated, "We went to Los Angeles and we did a bunch of writing out there. Lots of the songs are from those sessions. That’s the way we tend to work, we go on a trip, we write a lot and then it takes us a long while to actually work on the songs and finish them. The pandemic made us productive because suddenly there wasn't a gig at the weekend and we could really focus."

The album was described by the band as referencing from their earlier material but infused with more soul. Upon the release of the album, the band stated that the record is intended to be seen as a two-sided album - "side A touches on our roots, the pirate radio stations and influences we grew up with, and side B flows deeper into soul and darker textures and atmospheres."

== Track listing ==
Ground Control track listing
No.	Title	Writer(s)	Producer(s)	Length
1.	"Come Over" (featuring Anne-Marie and Tion Wayne)	Amir Izadkhah; Piers Aggett; Kesi Dryden; Leon "DJ Locksmith" Rolle; Olivia Devine; Anne-Marie Nicholson; Dennis Odunwo	Rudimental	3:26
2.	"Jumper" (featuring Kareen Lomax)	Izadkhah; Aggett; Dryden; Rolle; John Ryan II; Marco Borrero	Rudimental	3:14
3.	"Straight from the Heart" (featuring Nørskov)	Izadkhah; Aggett; Dryden; Rolle; Devine; Sophie Cooke; James Newman; Morgan Connie-Smith; Steven Meade; Daniel Langsman	Rudimental; Tom Demac^{[a]}; Cameron Gower Poole^{[v]}	3:28
4.	"Ghost (Refix)" (featuring Hardy Caprio)	Izadkhah; Aggett; Dryden; Rolle; Giana "Wens" Shabestari; Jennifer Decilveo; Conor Bellis; Hardy Tayyib-Bah	Rudimental; Bellis	3:13
5.	"Remember Their Names" (with MJ Cole featuring Josh Barry)	Izadkhah; Aggett; Dryden; Rolle; Matthew Coleman; Joshua Barry	Rudimental; MJ Cole	5:12
6.	"Be Somebody" (with James Vincent McMorrow)	Izadkhah; Aggett; Dryden; Rolle; James Vincent McMorrow; James Napier	Rudimental; Future Cut; Mark Ralph^{[c]}	3:44
7.	"Be the One" (featuring Morgan, Digga D and Tike)	Izadkhah; Aggett; Dryden; Rolle; Connie-Smith; Jay Weathers; Rhys Herbert; Warren O'Grady	Rudimental; Weathers	3:05
8.	"Handle My Own" (featuring Ella Henderson)	Izadkhah; Aggett; Dryden; Rolle; Ella Henderson; Samuel de Jong; Kenneth Gamble; Leon Huff	Rudimental	3:28
9.	"So Sorry" (with Skream)	Izadkhah; Aggett; Dryden; Rolle; Oliver Jones; Nicholson	Rudimental; Skream	3:51
10.	"Distance" (featuring Maverick Sabre and Kojey Radical)	Izadkhah; Aggett; Dryden; Rolle; Adio Marchant; Michael Stafford; Kwadwo Genfi	Rudimental; Karma Kid^{[a]}	3:52
11.	"Instajets" (with The Game and D Double E featuring BackRoad Gee)	Izadkhah; Aggett; Dryden; Rolle; Hugh Pescod; Jayceon Taylor; Darren Dixon	Rudimental; Redlight	2:35
12.	"Krazy" (featuring Afronaut Zu)	Izadkhah; Aggett; Dryden; Rolle; Mark Crown; Michael Watson; Samuel Knowles; Afronaut Zu	Rudimental	2:45
13.	"Make You Move" (featuring Nørskov and Keeya Keys)	Izadkhah; Aggett; Dryden; Rolle; Ebba Tove Nilsson; Keir Dickenson	Rudimental; Karma Kid	3:20
14.	"Hostess" (featuring Morgan)	Izadkhah; Aggett; Dryden; Rolle; Connie-Smith; Isaac Sakima; Jasper Lee Harris; Oliver Rodigan	Rudimental; Karma Kid; Cadenza	3:09
15.	"C'est Fini" (featuring RV and Lowkey)	Izadkhah; Aggett; Dryden; Rolle; Nicholson; Ester Dean; George Conway; Matthew Kopp; Bellis; Knowles; Jordan Townsend; Kareem Dennis	Rudimental; Karma Kid	3:15
16.	"Keep Your Head Up" (featuring Hamzaa and House Gospel Choir)	Izadkhah; Aggett; Dryden; Rolle; Renell Shaw; Max Abrahams; Oliver Hutchinson	Rudimental; 2fox	5:17
Total length:				56:54

Notes

- ^{^[c]} signifies a co-producer
- ^{^[a]} signifies an additional producer
- ^{^[v]} signifies a vocal producer

== Personnel ==
Rudimental

- Piers Aggett – drum programming (1–4, 8–11, 13–16), synthesizer (1–5, 7–11, 13–16), programming (5, 6), keyboards (12), bass synthesizer (16)
- Amir Amor – drum programming (1–5, 8–11, 13–16), guitar (1, 3, 5, 7, 8, 10–12, 14), bass (2, 4, 13, 15), programming (7), synthesizer (7, 9), keyboards (12, 16), percussion (16)
- Kesi Dryden – drum programming (1–5, 8, 10, 11, 13–16), synthesizer (2–5, 7–11, 13, 15, 16), programming (7), synthesizer programming (9), bass synthesizer (16)
- Leon Rolle – drum programming (1, 11, 14–16), keyboards, percussion (1–5, 8–11, 13–16); programming (7, 12), synthesizer (7)

Additional musicians

- Connor Bellis – programming (1), drum programming (4)
- Beth Aggett – backing vocals (2, 5, 8)
- Anne-Marie – backing vocals (2), vocals (1, 9)
- John Ryan – guitar (2)
- Kareen Lomax – vocals (2)
- Morgan – backing vocals (3), vocals (14)
- Taurean Antoine-Chagar – saxophone (3, 14)
- Harry Brown – trombone (3)
- Mark Crown – trumpet (3, 12, 14)
- Nørskov – vocals (3, 13)
- Hardy Caprio – vocals (4)
- Gigi Wens – vocals (4)
- Ian Burdge – cello (5)
- MJ Cole – drum programming, vocoder (5)
- Sally Herbert – string arrangement, violin (5)
- Josh Barry – vocals (5)
- S1mba – backing vocals (7)
- Renell Shaw – guitar (7, 12), backing vocals, bass (16)
- Jay Weathers – programming (7)
- Max Abrahams – drum programming (8, 16)
- Sam Newbold – saxophone (8, 13)
- Ella Henderson – vocals (8)
- Oliver Dene Jones – drum programming, synthesizer (9)
- Hamzaa – backing vocals (10), vocals (16)
- Sam Knowles – synthesizer (10), keyboards (12), drum programming (14, 15)
- Maverick Sabre – vocals (10)
- Kojey Radical – vocals (10)
- Redlight – drum programming, synthesizer (11)
- The Game – vocals (11)
- BackRoad Gee – vocals (11)
- D Double E – vocals (11)
- Tove Lo – backing vocals (13)
- Keeya Keys – backing vocals (13)
- Lowkey – vocals (15)
- RV – vocals (15)
- Natalie Maddix – choir direction, vocal arrangement (16)
- Oliver George Nobes Hutchinson – organ (16)
- Liza Jennings – vocal arrangement (16)
- House Gospel Choir – vocals (16)

Technical

- Kevin Grainger – mastering
- Greg Freeman – mixing
- Connor Bellis – engineering (all tracks), additional vocal recording (15)
- George Murphy – engineering, additional vocal recording (16)
- Ryan Fletcher – additional vocal recording (3)

== Charts ==
Chart performance for Ground Control
Chart (2021)	Peak position
Scottish Albums (OCC)	78
UK Albums (OCC)	16
UK Dance Albums (OCC)	1
