= Come Over (Rudimental song) =

2020 single by Rudimental featuring Anne-Marie and Tion Wayne

Single by Rudimental featuring Anne-Marie and Tion Wayne

from the album Ground Control
- Released: 28 August 2020
- Genre: UK garage
- Length: 3:26
- Label: Asylum
- Songwriter(s): Amir Amor; Anne-Marie Nicholson; Dennis Junior Odunwo; Leon Rolle; Olivia Devine; Piers Aggett; Kesi Dryden
- Producer(s): Rudimental

Rudimental singles chronology
"Easy on Me" (2020)	"Come Over" (2020)	"Blend" (2020)

Anne-Marie singles chronology
"To Be Young" (2020)	"Come Over" (2020)	"Problems" (2020)

Tion Wayne singles chronology
"Last Night" (2020)	"Come Over" (2020)

"Come Over" is a song by English drum and bass band Rudimental, featuring vocals from Anne-Marie and Tion Wayne. The song was released as a digital download on 28 August 2020. The song peaked at number twenty-six on the UK Singles Chart. The song was written by Amir Amor, Anne-Marie Nicholson, Dennis Junior Odunwo, Leon Rolle, Olivia Devine, Piers Aggett and Kesi Dryden.

== Music video ==
A music video to accompany the release of "Come Over" was first released onto YouTube on 28 August 2020.

== Personnel ==
Credits adapted from Tidal.

- Rudimental – producer
- Amir Amor – composer
- Anne-Marie Nicholson – composer, featured artist
- Dennis Junior Odunwo – composer, featured artist
- Leon Rolle – composer
- Olivia Devine – composer
- Piers Aggett – composer
- Kesi Dryden – composer

== Charts ==
Chart (2020)	Peak position
Scotland (OCC)	46
UK Singles (OCC)	26

== Certifications ==
Region	Certification	Certified units/sales
United Kingdom (BPI)	Gold	400,000^{‡}
^{‡} Sales+streaming figures based on certification alone.

== Release history ==
Region	Date	Format	Label	Ref.
Various	28 August 2020	Digital download; streaming	Asylum	
United Kingdom	25 September 2020	Contemporary hit radio	Asylum	
