= We the Generation =

- Standard edition cover

Studio album by Rudimental
- Released: 2 October 2015
- Recorded: 2014–15
- Genre: Drum and bass; house; soul; R&B
- Length: 60:04 (standard edition); 79:33 (deluxe edition)
- Label: Asylum; Atlantic; Black Butter
- Producer: Rudimental

Rudimental chronology
Home (2013)	We the Generation (2015)	Toast to Our Differences (2019)

Alternative cover
- Deluxe edition cover

Singles from We the Generation
- 1. "Bloodstream" Released: 29 March 2015; 2. "Never Let You Go" Released: 12 June 2015; 3. "I Will for Love" Released: 31 July 2015; 4. "Rumour Mill" Released: 28 August 2015; 5. "Lay It All on Me" Released: 25 September 2015; 6. "Common Emotion" Released: 25 March 2016

We the Generation is the second studio album by British drum and bass band Rudimental. The album was released on 2 October 2015, although the album leaked online a week prior to its release.

The album contains a number of collaborations with singers Will Heard and Anne-Marie, as well as appearances from Ed Sheeran, Lianne La Havas, Dizzee Rascal, Foy Vance, Ella Eyre, MNEK and Bobby Womack. A number of singles were released from the album prior to its release, including "Bloodstream", featuring Sheeran.

== Singles ==
- "Bloodstream", with collaboration Ed Sheeran, was released as the album's first single on 29 March 2015. It is a re-work of the original song which features on Sheeran's album x. The song reached number two on the UK Singles Chart.
- "Never Let You Go", featuring Foy Vance, was released as the album's second single on 12 June 2015. The track premiered on 27 April 2015 as BBC Radio 1 DJ Annie Mac's Hottest Record in the World. A music video was produced for the song which features the band as well as shots of Ukraine, Los Angeles, Morocco and the band's native United Kingdom. The single peaked at number 29 on the UK Singles Chart.
- "I Will for Love", featuring Will Heard, was released as the album's third single on 31 July 2015. The single did not chart on the UK Singles Chart, becoming the band's first single since "Spoons" not to reach the top 100. The single was later re-released alongside a remix EP, but again did not chart.
- "Rumour Mill", featuring both Anne-Marie and Will Heard, was released as the album's fourth single on 28 August 2015. The track had previously premiered on 19 June 2015 on BBC Radio 1, and a promotional video was released on 22 June 2015. Following the single's release in the form of a remix EP, the single charted at number 67 on the UK Singles Chart.
- "Lay It All on Me", also featuring Ed Sheeran, was released as the album's fifth single. The track premiered on 25 September 2015. The music video was released on 6 November 2015.
- "Common Emotion", featuring MNEK, was released as the album's sixth single on 25 March 2016.

=== Promotional singles ===
- "Love Ain't Just a Word", featuring Anne-Marie and Dizzee Rascal, was released as an instant grat single from the album on 17 July 2015. This subsequently resulted in the track peaking at number 108 on the UK Singles Chart. A promotional video for the song was also released.
- "We the Generation", featuring Mahalia, was released as a second instant grat single from the album on 18 September 2015, alongside the remix EP of the single "I Will for Love". The song did not chart on the UK Singles Chart.

== Track listing ==
We the Generation – Standard edition
No.	Title	Writer(s)	Length
1.	"I Will for Love" (featuring Will Heard)	Amir Izadkah; Piers Aggett; Kesi Dryden; Leon "DJ Locksmith" Rolle; Pablo Bowman; Richard Boardman; Robert Harvey; Cleo Tighe; Daniel Boyle	4:07
2.	"Never Let You Go" (featuring Foy Vance)	Izadkah; Aggett; Dryden; Rolle; Johnny McDaid; Foy Vance	3:54
3.	"We the Generation" (featuring Mahalia)	Izadkah; Aggett; Dryden; Rolle; Uzoechi Emenike; Mahalia Burkmar	3:41
4.	"Love Ain't Just a Word" (featuring Anne-Marie and Dizzee Rascal)	Izadkah; Aggett; Dryden; Rolle; Anne-Marie Nicholson; Dylan Mills; Jess Jackson; Thomas Jules	4:04
5.	"Rumour Mill" (featuring Anne-Marie and Will Heard)	Izadkah; Aggett; Dryden; Rolle; Emenike; Will Heard; Jess Glynne	4:03
6.	"Common Emotion" (featuring MNEK)	Izadkah; Aggett; Dryden; Rolle; Emenike	5:07
7.	"Go Far" (featuring Will Heard)	Izadkah; Aggett; Dryden; Rolle; Heard; Beanie Bhebhe	4:30
8.	"Foreign World" (featuring Anne-Marie)	Izadkah; Aggett; Dryden; Rolle; Jean-Baptise Kouame II; Lianne La Havas; Emenike	4:17
9.	"Too Cool" (featuring Ella Eyre)	Izadkah; Aggett; Dryden; Rolle; Ella Eyre; Jonny Harris; James Newman	3:59
10.	"Bloodstream" (with Ed Sheeran)	Ed Sheeran; Izadkah; Aggett; Dryden; Rolle; McDaid; Gary Lightbody	5:08
11.	"All That Love" (featuring Anne-Marie)	Izadkah; Aggett; Dryden; Rolle; Newman; Harris; Wayne Hector; Julie Frost; Nicholas Gale	3:55
12.	"Needn't Speak" (featuring Lianne La Havas)	Izadkah; Aggett; Dryden; Rolle; La Havas	4:58
13.	"Lay It All on Me" (featuring Ed Sheeran)	Izadkah; Aggett; Dryden; Rolle; Newman; Harris; Adam Eaglefield; Jacob Manson; Edward Sheeran; Max McElligott; Lasse Petersen; Gavin Slater; James Luke Wood	4:02
14.	"New Day" (featuring Bobby Womack)	Izadkah; Aggett; Dryden; Rolle; Robert Womack; Richard Feldman; Harold Payne	4:19
Total length:			60:04

We the Generation – Deluxe edition bonus tracks
No.	Title	Writer(s)	Length
15.	"Treading on Water" (featuring Sinéad Harnett and Will Heard)	Izadkah; Aggett; Dryden; Rolle; Sinéad Harnett; Heard	5:15
16.	"Run" (featuring Will Heard)	Izadkah; Aggett; Dryden; Rolle; Heard	4:46
17.	"Breathe" (featuring Lianne La Havas)	Izadkah; Aggett; Dryden; Rolle; La Havas; Clinton	4:58
18.	"System" (featuring Max Romeo, Earl 16 and Spee)	Izadkah; Aggett; Dryden; Rolle; Earl Daley; Spencer Graham; Max Romeo	4:30
Total length:			79:34

Notes

- Credits adapted from album liner notes.
- On physical copies of the deluxe edition, "All That Love" and "Treading on Water" switch positions.

== Charts ==
Chart (2015)	Peak position
Australian Albums (ARIA)	4
Belgian Albums (Ultratop Flanders)	14
Belgian Albums (Ultratop Wallonia)	47
Czech Albums (ČNS IFPI)	20
Dutch Albums (Album Top 100)	41
German Albums (Offizielle Top 100)	100
Hungarian Albums (MAHASZ)	4
Irish Albums (IRMA)	8
New Zealand Albums (RMNZ)	5
Scottish Albums (OCC)	1
Swiss Albums (Schweizer Hitparade)	32
UK Albums (OCC)	1
UK Dance Albums (OCC)	1
US Billboard 200	190
US Top Dance Albums (Billboard)	7
US Heatseekers Albums (Billboard)	10

== Certifications ==
Certifications for We the Generation
Region	Certification	Certified units/sales
New Zealand (RMNZ)	Platinum	15,000^{‡}
United Kingdom (BPI)	Gold	100,000^{‡}
^{‡} Sales+streaming figures based on certification alone.

== Release history ==
Region	Date	Format(s)	Edition(s)	Label	Ref.
Worldwide	2 October 2015	CD; digital download; vinyl	Standard; deluxe	Asylum; Atlantic; Black Butter	
