= Home (Rudimental album) =

Studio album by Rudimental
- Released: 29 April 2013
- Recorded: 2011–2012
- Genres: Drum and bass; house; liquid funk; soul
- Length: 56:23
- Labels: Asylum; Atlantic; Black Butter
- Producers: Rudimental; Mike Spencer

Rudimental chronology
| Home (2013) | We the Generation (2015) |

Singles from Home
- 1. "Spoons" Released: 20 February 2012; 2. "Feel the Love" Released: 14 May 2012; 3. "Not Giving In" Released: 18 November 2012; 4. "Waiting All Night" Released: 14 April 2013; 5. "Right Here" Released: 12 August 2013; 6. "Free" Released: 18 November 2013; 7. "Powerless" Released: 23 February 2014; 8. "Give You Up" Released: June 2014

Home is the debut studio album by British drum and bass band Rudimental. It was released on 29 April 2013 by Asylum Records, Atlantic Records and Black Butter Records. The album includes the singles "Spoons", "Feel the Love", "Not Giving In", "Waiting All Night", "Right Here", "Free", "Powerless", and "Give You Up". The album cover features the Hackney Peace Carnival Mural. It was nominated for the 2013 Mercury Prize.

The album's cover depicts Dalston Peace Mural in Hackney, London.

== Individual tracks ==
=== Singles ===
- "Spoons" was released as the album's first single on 20 February 2012. It features vocals from MNEK and Syron, with the treble created with the sounds of spoons, hence the name for the single. It was also released as a free promotional single on iTunes.
- "Feel the Love" was released as the album's second single on 14 May 2012. It features vocals from John Newman. The song peaked at number one in the United Kingdom.
- "Not Giving In" was released as the third single from the album on 18 November 2012. It features vocals from John Newman and Alex Clare. The song peaked at number fourteen in the United Kingdom.
- "Waiting All Night" was released as the fourth single from the album on 14 April 2013. It features vocals from Ella Eyre. The song peaked at number one in the United Kingdom.
- "Right Here" was released as the fifth single from the album on 12 August 2013. It features vocals from Foxes. The song peaked at number fourteen in the United Kingdom.
- "Free" was released as the sixth single from the album on 18 November 2013. It features vocals from Emeli Sandé. The song peaked at number 26 in the United Kingdom.
- "Powerless" was released as the album's seventh single on 23 February 2014. It features vocals from Becky Hill.
- "Give You Up" was released as the eighth single in June 2014, taken from the deluxe edition of the album. It features vocals from Alex Clare. It was featured in the game FIFA 15.

=== Promotional songs ===
- "Hell Could Freeze" was released on 14 January 2013 as a promotional single. It was originally intended to be the album's third official single after "Feel the Love" and "Not Giving In". The song was first previewed on 27 November 2012, when it was named the Hottest Record in the World by Zane Lowe on his BBC Radio 1 show. The song features American rapper Angel Haze. It also features additional vocals from Beth Aggett and backing vocals from MNEK. The Skream remix was included on the Waiting All Night EP, the platinum edition of the album and as an American bonus track.
- "Baby" (featuring MNEK and Sinéad Harnett) was first released as the second original track from the Waiting All Night EP. The music video, directed by Rob Rowland, was released on 24 April 2013 to promote the release of the album. A remix competition for the track, promoted by Warner Music UK Limited in collaboration with SoundCloud, was held from 22 August 2013 to 6 October 2013.

== Critical reception ==
Professional ratings
Aggregate scores
| Source | Rating |
|---|---|
| Metacritic | 71/100 |
Review scores
| Source | Rating |
| The Guardian | 3/5 stars |
| NME | 7/10 |
| PopMatters | 6/10 |
| Spin | 8/10 |
| Sputnikmusic | 3.7/5 |

The album received generally favourable reviews from music critics, scoring 71 at aggregator website Metacritic. It was nominated for the 2013 Mercury Prize.

== Track listing ==
All tracks are written by Piers Aggett, Amir Amor and Kesi Dryden, with additional writing credits shown below

| No. | Title | Writer(s) | Length |
|---|---|---|---|
| 1. | "Home" (featuring Sinéad Harnett) | Sinéad Harnett | 3:52 |
| 2. | "Feel the Love" (featuring John Newman) | John Newman | 4:05 |
| 3. | "Right Here" (featuring Foxes) | Jonny Harris; Louisa Rose Allen | 5:36 |
| 4. | "Hell Could Freeze" (featuring Angel Haze) | Raykeea Wilson; Uzoechi Emenike; Beth Aggett | 4:40 |
| 5. | "Spoons" (featuring MNEK and Syron) | Emenike | 5:22 |
| 6. | "Hide" (featuring Sinéad Harnett) | Emenike; Harnett | 6:01 |
| 7. | "Powerless" (featuring Becky Hill) | Becky Hill; Hannah Symons | 3:55 |
| 8. | "More Than Anything" (featuring Emeli Sandé) | Emeli Sandé; Jessica Symonds; Renell Shaw | 4:55 |
| 9. | "Not Giving In" (featuring John Newman and Alex Clare) | John Newman | 3:59 |
| 10. | "Baby" (featuring MNEK and Sinéad Harnett) | Emenike; Harnett | 4:00 |
| 11. | "Waiting All Night" (featuring Ella Eyre) | James Newman; Harris | 4:52 |
| 12. | "Free" (featuring Emeli Sandé) | Sandé | 3:36 |

UK deluxe edition bonus tracks
| No. | Title | Writer(s) | Length |
|---|---|---|---|
| 13. | "Give You Up" (featuring Alex Clare) | John Newman; Alex Clare | 5:01 |
| 14. | "Alien Bashment" | | 3:50 |
| 15. | "Solo" (featuring Ella Eyre and Mark Crown) | Ella McMahon; Mark Crown | 9:27 |
| 16. | "Feel the Love" (Rudimental VIP) (featuring John Newman) | | 6:42 |

US deluxe edition bonus tracks
| No. | Title | Length |
|---|---|---|
| 13. | "Feel the Love" (featuring Wale) | 3:56 |
| 14. | "Feel the Love" (Woz Remix) (featuring Childish Gambino) | 3:37 |
| 15. | "Hell Could Freeze" (Skream Remix) (featuring Angel Haze) | 6:31 |

=== Platinum edition ===
Platinum edition bonus tracks
| No. | Title | Length |
|---|---|---|
| 13. | "Free" (featuring Emeli Sandé and Nas) | 4:29 |
| 14. | "Waiting All Night" (featuring Ella Eyre) (Kidnap Kid Remix) | 3:26 |
| 15. | "Hell Could Freeze" (featuring Angel Haze) (Skream Remix) | 6:34 |
| 16. | "Right Here" (featuring Foxes) (Andy C Remix) | 4:32 |
| 17. | "Feel the Love" (featuring John Newman) (Gorgon City Remix) | 4:00 |

Platinum edition DVD
| No. | Title | Length |
|---|---|---|
| 1. | "Feel the Love" (featuring John Newman) |
| 2. | "Not Giving In" (featuring John Newman and Alex Clare) |
| 3. | "Waiting All Night" (featuring Ella Eyre) |
| 4. | "Right Here" (featuring Foxes) |
| 5. | "Baby" (featuring MNEK and Sinéad Harnett) |
| 6. | "Free" (featuring Emeli Sandé) |
| 7. | "Feel the Love" (Festival Montage Footage) |
| 8. | "Free" (Live from Studio) |

== Charts and certifications ==
=== Weekly charts ===
| Chart (2013) | Peak position |
|---|---|
| Australian Albums (ARIA) | 2 |
| Austrian Albums (Ö3 Austria) | 56 |
| Belgian Albums (Ultratop Flanders) | 23 |
| Belgian Albums (Ultratop Wallonia) | 99 |
| Dutch Albums (Album Top 100) | 41 |
| Irish Albums (IRMA) | 5 |
| New Zealand Albums (RMNZ) | 2 |
| Scottish Albums (Official Charts) | 1 |
| Swiss Albums (Schweizer Hitparade) | 34 |
| UK Albums (Official Charts) | 1 |

| Chart (2023) | Peak position |
|---|---|
| Hungarian Albums (MAHASZ) | 35 |

=== Year-end charts ===
| Chart (2013) | Position |
|---|---|
| Australian Albums (ARIA) | 32 |
| Belgian Albums (Ultratop Flanders) | 83 |
| New Zealand Albums (RMNZ) | 31 |
| UK Albums (OCC) | 17 |

| Chart (2014) | Position |
|---|---|
| Australian Albums (ARIA) | 46 |
| UK Albums (OCC) | 43 |

== Certifications ==
Certifications for Home
| Region | Certification | Certified units/sales |
|---|---|---|
| Australia (ARIA) | Platinum | 70,000^{^} |
| New Zealand (RMNZ) | 3× Platinum | 45,000^{‡} |
| United Kingdom (BPI) | 2× Platinum | 600,000^{‡} |
^{^} Shipments figures based on certification alone.^{‡} Sales+streaming figures based on certification alone.

== Release history ==
Release history and formats for Home
| Region | Date | Format | Label | Ref. |
|---|---|---|---|---|
| United Kingdom | 29 April 2013 | CD; digital download | Asylum; Atlantic; Black Butter | |
| Japan | 22 May 2013 | CD | Warner Music Japan | |
