= Right Here (Rudimental song) =

Single by Rudimental featuring Foxes

from the album Home
- Released: 12 August 2013
- Recorded: 2011–12
- Genre: Drum and bass; liquid funk
- Length: 5:36
- Label: Asylum; Atlantic
- Songwriters: Rudimental; Jonny Harris; Louisa Rose Allen
- Producer: Rudimental

Rudimental singles chronology
"Waiting All Night" (2013)	"Right Here" (2013)	"Free" (2013)

Foxes singles chronology
"Clarity" (2012)	"Right Here" (2013)	"Youth" (2013)

"Right Here" is a song by British drum and bass band Rudimental. It features vocals from Foxes. The song was released in the United Kingdom on 12 August 2013 as the fifth single from their debut studio album, Home (2013).

The song was originally released on 29 April 2013 as a promotional single. The Andy C remix was released two weeks earlier through the Waiting All Night EP. Hot Since 82's remix was also included on his debut studio album Little Black Book.

== Music video ==
A music video to accompany the release of "Right Here" was first released onto YouTube on 5 July 2013 at a total length of six minutes and nineteen seconds. The music video was shot at the Tiger Temple in Western Thailand, which is a Theravada Buddhist temple. It was directed by Josh Cole who had also previously filmed the music video for "Not Giving In". The video features martial artist Master Liu Gao Jie, who fights off poachers played by Chavalit Chaonoi and various others.

== Track listings ==
Digital download
No.	Title	Length
1.	"Right Here" (featuring Foxes)	5:36

"Right Here" – remixes
No.	Title	Length
1.	"Right Here" (Hot Since 82 Remix)	8:37
2.	"Right Here" (Krystal Klear Remix)	4:49
3.	"Right Here" (Andy C Remix)	4:31
4.	"Right Here" (My Nu Leng Remix)	5:16

== Charts ==
Chart (2013)	Peak position
Australia (ARIA)	29
Belgium (Ultratip Bubbling Under Flanders)	9
Belgium (Ultratip Bubbling Under Wallonia)	42
Scottish Singles Sales (Official Charts)	19
Slovakia Airplay (ČNS IFPI)	50
UK Singles (Official Charts)	14
UK Dance (Official Charts)	4

== Certifications ==
Region	Certification	Certified units/sales
New Zealand (RMNZ)	Platinum	30,000^{‡}
United Kingdom (BPI)	Silver	200,000^{‡}
^{‡} Sales+streaming figures based on certification alone.

== Release history ==
Region	Date	Format	Label
United Kingdom	12 August 2013	Digital download	Asylum; Atlantic
