= Black Butter Records =

British record label

- Founded: 2010
- Founder: Olly Wood; Henry Village; Joe Gossa
- Status: Active
- Genre: Electronic; Rap; Grime; Bass music
- Country of origin: United Kingdom
- Location: London, England
- Official website: black-butter.com

Black Butter Records is a British record label based in London, England. Founded in 2010 by Olly Wood, Henry Village and Joe Gossa, the self-funded start-up went on to become an established tastemaker label, and one part of a camp of music-related businesses in addition to management and publishing.

The record label had early association with Clean Bandit, Rudimental, Jessie Ware, MNEK, and Gorgon City. In a 2013 interview – that recognised the network of artists coming through Black Butter were at the forefront of an emerging scene – Henry said: “People's taste seems really broad right now. You're hearing garage, house, drum'n'bass, pop, reggae and dub, but it all feels like it makes sense. It feels like a really exciting movement going on." He noted that the formation of BBC Radio 1Xtra and its vital contribution to showcasing underground music on a mainstream platform, boosting its crossover potential.

Recognised by industry, Black Butter was awarded 'Best Small Label' at the 2012 Association of Independent Music Awards. Among numerous award nominations over the years, co-founder Joe has won A&R awards from Music Business Worldwide and Link Up TV, and co-founder Henry won the inaugural Entrepreneur Award at the 2015 Artist and Manager Awards.

== History ==
=== Formation and early years ===
Black Butter Records was intended initially as an outlet for musicians who were signed to corresponding artist management company, Stackhouse Management, (previously home to Rudimental, Gorgon City, Redlight, Sub Focus and more). Its first releases were ‘Lovestruck’ by Man Like Me and 'Soundclash' by RackNRuin (Gorgon City's Matt Robson-Scott) who enlisted pre-fame Jessie Ware to vocal the track.

The Black Butter brand began building presence by putting on club nights and hosting festival stages, while releasing mostly singles and EPs. In its infancy, the label was described as a hub of the British electronic music scene while it spanned several sub-genres. The label soon built a reputation as a tastemaker in UK rap/grime/bass music space as its third release, Marco Del Horno v Swerve's ‘Ho! Riddim’ featuring P Money, gained popularity on YouTube and cult classic status.

Among notable early releases on the label are debut singles from Clean Bandit ('A+E'), Gorgon City ('Real', featuring Yasmin), and Rudimental ('Deep In The Valley', featuring MC Shantie).

The following year, Rudimental track ‘Spoons’ (featuring a young MNEK and Syron) began to impact daytime radio. Rudimental signed with Atlantic/Asylum via Black Butter and the label's big mainstream breakthrough came in 2012 with the release of Rudimental's 'Feel the Love' (featuring John Newman), earning their first UK number one and leading the way for future platinum status of the corresponding debut album Home that also achieved 10 weeks atop the UK Dance Chart and placed #17 on the UK end-of-year chart. In a 2014 Music Week interview, Henry said that the involvement of investor and mentor Roger Ames was fundamental to navigating the music industry to achieve such business growth.

In April 2014, Gorgon City's 'Ready For Your Love' (featuring MNEK) achieved UK Dance Chart #2, UK Singles Chart #4, and was #59 in the UK end-of-year chart. Their debut album Sirens was released in October 2014, featuring a cast of rising vocal talent – it achieved UK Dance Chart #1, UK Albums Chart #10 and Gold-certified status.

=== Sony Music UK ===
In November 2014, Black Butter Records became a standalone entity – alongside RCA, Columbia and Sony CMG – under Sony Music UK – founders Henry and Joe serving as co-presidents and Nick Worthington heading up A&R.

Sony UK's CEO Jason Iley said in a statement: “Black Butter is the most exciting label to have emerged in the last five years, so this is a real coup for us. Henry and Joe bring with them a rare talent for spotting exceptional acts.”

Music Week editor Tim Ingham said: “That arguably renders the deal as the most significant piece of major-indie label business since Universal acquired V2 in 2007.”

Notable releases in this period came from AJR, Bakar, J Hus, Jae5, Young T & Bugsey and more. BB were instrumental in breaking Zara Larsson and were the UK partner on global hit acts such as DJ Khaled, French Montana, and more.

Breaking through in this era, J Hus and collaborator producer Jae5 saw the former's artist debut studio album Common Sense go Top 10 in the UK in 2017 (peaking #6), win the NME Best Album of 2018, secure a Mercury Prize nomination, MOBO and BRIT Awards nominations, plus recognition in Music Week Awards artist management category. The album was recognised in tastemaker end-of-year Best Of lists: Crack Magazine, Complex, Fact, NME, Pigeons and Planes, The Guardian. In the UK, it is certified platinum and finished #47 on the 2017 end-of-year chart, and #66 in 2018. Black Butter's Joe Gossa signed J Hus in 2015 and said he is ‘part of a golden age for the UK’. With underground success built, the track ‘Lean & Bop’ broke through with millions of streams and mixtape The 15th Day was released. Commercial breakthrough saw track ‘Did You See’ become his first Top 10 and the campaign garnered industry recognition.

The labels won the Artist Marketing award at the 2021 Music Week Awards for work on Young T & Bugsey who cracked the US charts with the help of TikTok virality of their track 'Don't Rush' with Headie One.

=== Publishing ===
In 2013, Black Butter launched its publishing arm and entered a joint venture with BMG Chrysalis in 2014.

An early notable signing was Jess Glynne – co-president Joe Gossa approached the young songwriter after being impressed by song demos she had created with Jin Jin (aka Janée Bennett). In a 2015 Billboard interview, Jess recalls: “[Joe] went mental. He introduced me to all the right people – lawyers, managers, I signed a deal for publishing.” Celebrating her first headline/solo number one single, she said: “Thank you to Joe Gossa at Black Butter records cause without him I don't think I would be here today!” She went on to have seven number ones on the UK Singles Chart – the most of any British female solo artist.

In 2015, up-and-coming east London producer Jae5 signed to Black Butter for publishing and later to the label as an artist after impressing Joe with early J Hus demos. They went on to have breakthrough commercial success under Black Butter's Sony partnership. Jae5 went on to produce for Burna Boy, Dave, Tion Wayne and has been recognised by multiple industry outlets for his work, including: Grammys, MOBOs MBW A&R Awards, Ivors Academy, GRM Daily.

Black Butter publishing signings include: Aquilo, Bipolar Sunshine, Chloe Leone, Elderbrook, Everything Everything, James Newman, Jae5, Jess Glynne, Kiko Bun, Laura Dockrill, Mark Crown.

=== Other ===
Rudimental's East London studio, Major Toms, was a hub for Black Butter's early label roster.

Black Butter and Method Music were partners in Disclosure and Rudimental’s Wild Life Festival. Held annually between 2015-2018, its inaugural event was winner of Best New Festival at the 2015 UK Festival Awards.

Black Butter and Sony Music UK launched a joint venture label, 4ZA, in partnership with music executive Tom Cater.

== Roster ==
Past and present

- AJR
- Amaria BB
- Badgirl$
- Bakar
- Charlotte Plank
- Clean Bandit
- Deyaz
- Drums of Death
- Dusky
- Elderbrook
- French Montana
- GoldLink
- Gorgon City
- Hostage
- J Hus
- Jae5
- Jess Glynne
- Jimothy Lacoste
- Joel Compass
- Jnr Choi
- K-Trap
- Kidnap Kid
- Kiko Bun
- King Henry
- Kwn
- Lulu James
- Marshall F
- MNEK
- My Nu Leng
- Nonô
- Offrami
- P-rallel
- Rudimental
- Sailor & I
- Scrufizzer
- Shaybo
- Sinead Harnett
- Solomon Grey
- Syron
- Take a Daytrip
- Takura
- Tazer
- Woz
- Will Heard
- Yasmin
- Young T & Bugsey
- Zara Larsson
