= Free (Rudimental song) =

Single by Rudimental featuring Emeli Sandé

from the album Home
- Released: 18 November 2013
- Recorded: 2012
- Genre: Soul; folk
- Length: 3:36
- Label: Asylum; Atlantic
- Songwriters: Rudimental; Emeli Sandé
- Producers: Rudimental; Mike Spencer

Rudimental singles chronology
"Right Here" (2013)	"Free" (2013)	"Powerless" (2014)

Emeli Sandé singles chronology
"Lifted" (2013)	"Free" (2013)	"What I Did for Love" (2015)

Nas singles chronology
"Cherry Wine" (2012)	"Free" (2013)	"Something to Believe in" (2015)

"Free" is a song by British drum and bass band Rudimental. It features the vocals from English-born Scottish singer and songwriter Emeli Sandé. The song was released in the United Kingdom on 18 November 2013 as the sixth single from their debut studio album, Home (2013). Another version of the single also features American rapper Nas; this version is featured in 2K Sports' WWE 2K15 video game.

== Music video ==
A music video to accompany the release of "Free" was first released onto YouTube on 24 October 2013 at a total length of four minutes and thirty-two seconds. The video features real life wingsuit flier and extreme sports athlete Jokke Sommer gliding through the air around the Eiger mountain in the Alps. The video was directed by Stu Thomson and required no post-production for the stunts, with Sommer displaying his real ability on film.

== Track listings ==
Album version
No.	Title	Length
1.	"Free" (featuring Emeli Sandé)	3:36

Remix EP Download
No.	Title	Length
1.	"Free" (featuring Emeli Sandé and Nas)	4:30
2.	"Free" (Maya Jane Coles Remix)	5:32
3.	"Free" (Roy Davis Jr Remix)	5:07
4.	"Free" (Jack Beats Remix)	5:20

== Charts and certifications ==
=== Weekly charts ===
Weekly chart performance
Chart (2013–14)	Peak position
Australia (ARIA)	5
Austria (Ö3 Austria Top 40)	41
Belgium (Ultratop 50 Flanders)	36
Finland Airplay (Radiosoittolista)	46
Germany (GfK)	38
Ireland (IRMA)	9
New Zealand (Recorded Music NZ)	5
Scotland Singles (OCC)	21
Slovenia (SloTop50)	43
UK Dance (OCC)	6
UK Singles (OCC)	26

=== Year-end charts ===
Annual chart rankings
Chart (2014)	Position
Australia (ARIA)	27
New Zealand (Recorded Music NZ)	28

=== Certifications ===
Certifications and sales for "Free"
Region	Certification	Certified units/sales
Australia (ARIA)	4× Platinum	280,000^{^}
New Zealand (RMNZ)	2× Platinum	60,000^{‡}
United Kingdom (BPI)	Silver	200,000^{‡}
^{^} Shipments figures based on certification alone.^{‡} Sales+streaming figures based on certification alone.

== Release history ==
Street dates
Region	Date	Format	Label
United Kingdom	18 November 2013	Digital download	Asylum; Atlantic
