= Powerless (Rudimental song) =

Single by Rudimental featuring Becky Hill

from the album Home
- Released: 23 February 2014
- Recorded: 2012–13
- Genre: Drum and bass; soul
- Length: 3:55
- Label: Asylum; Atlantic
- Songwriter(s): Rudimental; Becky Hill; Hannah Symons
- Producer(s): Rudimental

Rudimental singles chronology
"Free" (2013)	"Powerless" (2014)	"Give You Up" (2014)

Becky Hill singles chronology
"Afterglow" (2013)	"Powerless" (2014)	"Gecko (Overdrive)" (2014)

"Powerless" is a song by British drum and bass band Rudimental. It features the vocals from English singer Becky Hill. The song was released in the United Kingdom on 23 February 2014 as the sixth single from their debut studio album, Home (2013).

== Music video ==
A music video to accompany the release of "Powerless" was first released onto YouTube on 29 January 2014 at a total length of three minutes and fifty-five seconds. It depicts the story of professional boxers Deano and Scotty Burrell, who are identical twin brothers.

== Track listings ==
Album version
No.	Title	Length
7.	"Powerless" (featuring Becky Hill)	3:55

Remixes
No.	Title	Length
1.	"Powerless" (Redlight Animal Youth Remix)	4:24
2.	"Powerless" (MK Remix)	6:26
3.	"Powerless" (TIEKS Remix)	5:13

== Chart performance ==
=== Weekly charts ===
Chart (2014)	Peak position
UK Dance (OCC)	19
UK Singles (OCC)	73

== Release history ==
Region	Date	Format	Label
United Kingdom	23 February 2014	Digital download	Asylum; Atlantic
