= Waiting All Night =

Single by Rudimental featuring Ella Eyre

from the album Home
- Released: 14 April 2013
- Recorded: 2011–12
- Genre: Drum and bass; liquid funk
- Length: 4:52 (album version); 3:33 (radio edit)
- Label: Asylum; Atlantic
- Songwriters: Rudimental; James Newman; Jonny Harris
- Producer: Rudimental

Rudimental singles chronology
"Not Giving In" (2012)	"Waiting All Night" (2013)	"Right Here" (2013)

Ella Eyre singles chronology
"Waiting All Night" (2013)	"Think About It" (2013)

"Waiting All Night" is a song by English drum and bass band Rudimental. It features vocals from English singer Ella Eyre. The song was released in the United Kingdom on 14 April 2013 as the fourth single from their debut studio album, Home (2013). The song reached number one in the UK Singles Chart and has also charted in Australia and Belgium. The group, along with Eyre, performed a live version of the song for BBC Radio 1's Live Lounge, which features on the Live Lounge 2013 compilation album.

A mashup of the song with Bastille's "Pompeii" was performed live by Rudimental, Eyre and Bastille at the 2014 BRIT Awards. The mashup entered the UK Singles Chart at number 21.

== Critical reception ==
Lewis Corner of Digital Spy gave the song a positive review stating:

"I've been waiting all night for you to tell me what you want", singer Ella Eyre's warm and tender vocal declares over steadily rising drum-step and synthesised organ, before the chorus bursts open with soul-flying brass. It may echo much of their previous hits – if not with a slightly darker edge – but nevertheless their sound is one they can officially claim to dominate..

== Music video ==
A music video to accompany the release of "Waiting All Night" was first released onto YouTube on 4 April 2013 at a total length of five minutes and fifteen seconds. The music video is the inspirational true life-story of San Francisco-born BMX champion and actor Kurt Yaeger, who became an amputee after an accident in 2006. All the characters in the clip are professional BMX'ers and the real friends of Yaeger. Director Nez Khammal approached him after he found his information on his website and told Yaeger that the band was interested in his story.

== Accolades ==
At the 2014 Brit Awards, the song won the British Single of the Year.

== Usage in media ==
"Waiting All Night" was featured in the promo of MTV Latin America Music in on.

An instrumental version of the song is used in BBC's Match of the Day 2 as background music to Goal of the Month, and is also used by Sky Sports during touchdown round-ups in their NFL coverage.

The song is also featured in Lexus International's video "The Lexus Hoverboard: It's here", which unveils their new hoverboard.

== Track listing ==
Digital download
No.	Title	Length
1.	"Waiting All Night" (featuring Ella Eyre)	4:52
2.	"Baby" (featuring MNEK and Sinead Harnett)	4:00
3.	"Right Here" (featuring Foxes) (Andy C remix)	4:31
4.	"Hell Could Freeze" (featuring Angel Haze) (Skream remix)	6:31
5.	"Waiting All Night" (featuring Ella Eyre) (Kidnap Kid remix)	4:28
6.	"Waiting All Night" (featuring Ella Eyre) (Clean Bandit remix)	3:57
7.	"Waiting All Night" (featuring Ella Eyre) (Lee Foss remix)	5:04

== Charts ==
=== Weekly charts ===
Chart (2013)	Peak position
Australia (ARIA)	6
Austria (Ö3 Austria Top 40)	37
Belgium (Ultratop 50 Flanders)	13
Belgium (Ultratip Bubbling Under Wallonia)	28
Czech Republic Airplay (ČNS IFPI)	4
Czech Republic Singles Digital (ČNS IFPI)	45
Euro Digital Song Sales (Billboard)	2
France (SNEP)	89
Hungary (Dance Top 40)	36
Hungary (Rádiós Top 40)	3
Iceland (Tónlist)	16
Ireland (IRMA)	4
New Zealand (Recorded Music NZ)	9
Netherlands (Dutch Top 40)	19
Netherlands (Single Top 100)	26
Poland (Polish Airplay Top 100)	4
Scotland Singles (OCC)	2
Slovakia Airplay (ČNS IFPI)	37
Switzerland (Schweizer Hitparade)	67
UK Dance (OCC)	1
UK Singles (OCC)	1

=== Year-end charts ===
Chart (2013)	Position
Australia (ARIA)	74
Belgium (Ultratop 50 Flanders)	46
Hungary (Rádiós Top 40)	42
Netherlands (Dutch Top 40)	93
Netherlands (Single Top 100)	96
New Zealand (Recorded Music NZ)	49
UK Singles (Official Charts Company)	12

== Certifications ==
Certifications for "Waiting All Night"
Region	Certification	Certified units/sales
Australia (ARIA)	Platinum	70,000^{^}
Belgium (BRMA)	Gold	15,000^{*}
New Zealand (RMNZ)	4× Platinum	120,000^{‡}
United Kingdom (BPI)	3× Platinum	1,800,000^{‡}
Streaming
Norway (IFPI Norway)	Gold	1,500,000^{†}
^{*} Sales figures based on certification alone.^{^} Shipments figures based on certification alone.^{‡} Sales+streaming figures based on certification alone.^{†} Streaming-only figures based on certification alone.

== Release history ==
Region	Date	Format	Label
United Kingdom	14 April 2013	Digital download	Asylum; Atlantic
