= Never Let You Go (Rudimental song) =

Single by Rudimental featuring Foy Vance

from the album We the Generation
- Released: 4 June 2015
- Recorded: 2015
- Genre: Drum and bass; soul
- Length: 3:54
- Label: Asylum; Atlantic
- Songwriters: Rudimental; Johnny McDaid; Foy Vance
- Producer: Rudimental

Rudimental singles chronology
"Bloodstream" (2015)	"Never Let You Go" (2015)	"I Will for Love" (2015)

Foy Vance singles chronology
"Janey" (2013)	"Never Let You Go" (2015)	"Lay It On Me" (2017)

"Never Let You Go" is a song by British drum and bass band Rudimental, featuring Foy Vance, released on 4 June 2015 as the second single from the group's second studio album, We the Generation (2015). The track premiered on 27 April 2015 as BBC Radio 1 DJ Annie Mac's Hottest Record in the World.

== Music video ==
A music video was produced for the song which features the band as well as shots of Ukraine, Los Angeles, Morocco and the band's native United Kingdom.

== Track listings ==
Digital download — single
No.	Title	Length
1.	"Never Let You Go" (featuring Foy Vance)	3:54

Digital download — EP
No.	Title	Length
1.	"Never Let You Go" (Don Diablo Remix)	4:34
2.	"Never Let You Go" (Feder Remix)	4:39
3.	"Never Let You Go" (Soul Clap Remix)	6:11
4.	"Never Let You Go" (SpectraSoul Remix)	4:35
5.	"Never Let You Go" (M.A.X Remix)	5:06
6.	"Never Let You Go" (Weiss Remix)	6:04

== Live performances ==
Programme	Episode	Date
Later... with Jools Holland	Series 46, Episode 6	19 May 2015
TFI Friday	Special	12 June 2015

== Charts ==
Chart (2015)	Peak position
Australia (ARIA)	54
Belgium (Ultratip Bubbling Under Flanders)	29
Poland (Video Chart)	4
UK Dance (OCC)	9
UK Singles (OCC)	29

== Release history ==
Region	Date	Format
United Kingdom	4 June 2015	Digital download
