= Daisy Syron Russell =

- Born: Peckham, South East London, England
- Genres: UK funky; 2-step; hip house; dance; soul
- Occupations: Singer, songwriter, musician
- Years active: 2012–present

Daisy Syron Russell, formerly known mononymously as Syron, is an English singer from London with plays on both Radio 1 and 1Xtra, and classed as "one to watch" by MTV and named "one of 2012’s coolest new female talents" by ID magazine. Her music has been blogged by The xx, and Idolator, as well as tweeted about by Danny Brown. Popjustice is also a fan.

Syron went to BRIT School of Performing Arts & Technology in South London.

== Discography ==
=== Mixtapes ===
- Mixtape 1 (19 September 2012)
- Mixtape 2 (20 March 2013)

=== Extended plays ===
- Lucid (11 May 2014)
- Purple (28 May 2019)

=== Singles ===
==== As Syron ====
- "Breaking" (24 September 2012)
- "Waterproof" (2 January 2013)
- "Here" (24 March 2013)
- "Colour Me In" (28 November 2013)
- "Three Dreams" (8 February 2014)
- "All I Need" (31 May 2015)
- "Talkin' Crazy" (25 September 2015)

==== As Tallulah ====
- "I Feel Again" (18 October 2017)
- "Time After Time" (14 August 2018)
- "More Than Friends" (14 February 2019)
- "Don't Leave" (20 June 2019)
- "Sundress" (18 September 2019)

=== Featured singles ===
- Rudimental - "Spoons" (with MNEK) (20 February 2012)
- Solo - "Home Is Where It Hurts" (11 June 2012)
- Tensnake - "Mainline" (2 November 2012)
- Redlight - "Thunder" (10 March 2014)
- Mista Silva - "Green Light" (9 October 2014)

=== Songwriting credits ===
- f(x) - "Rude Love"
