= Rudimental =

English drum and bass band

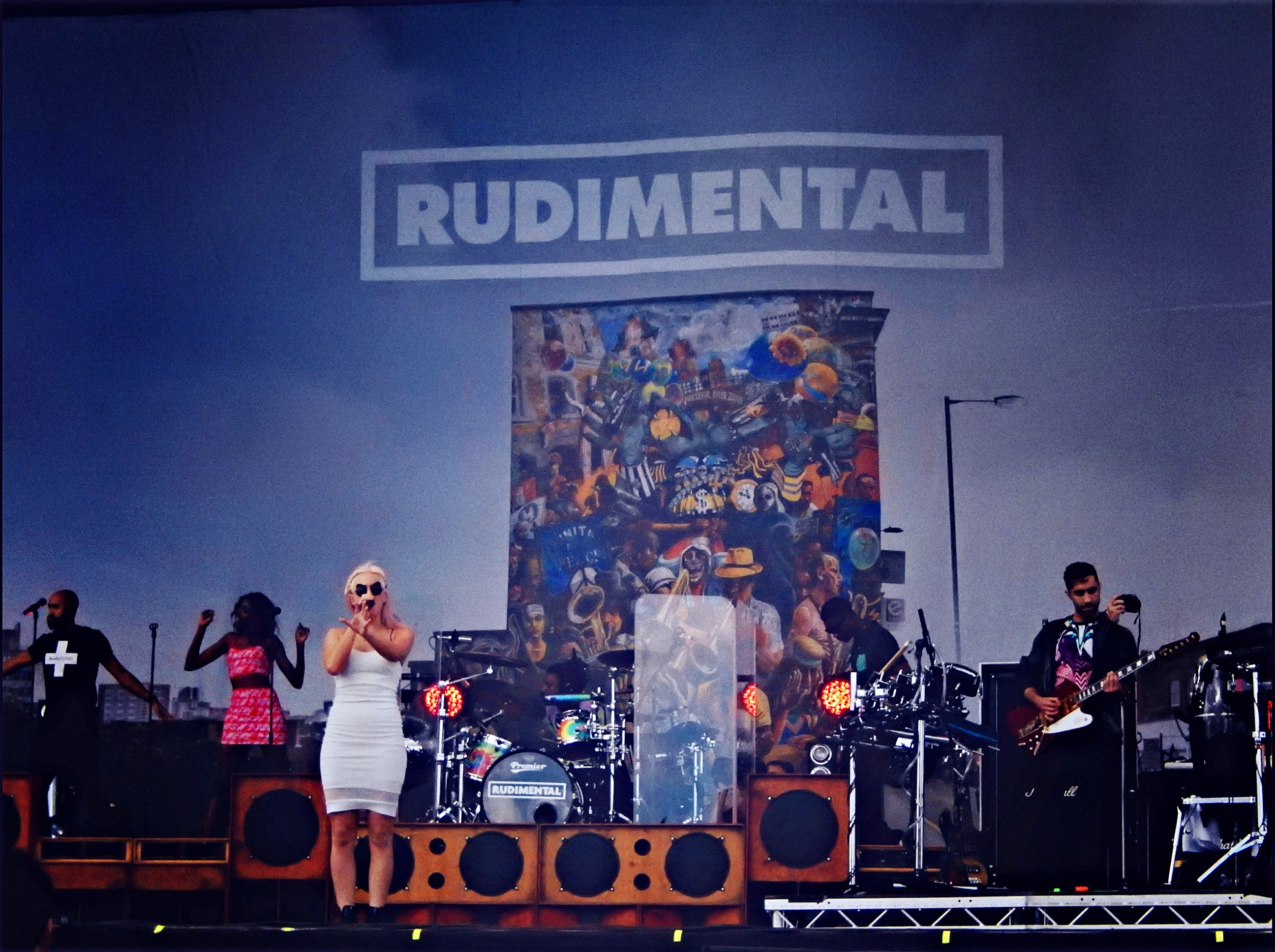
- Rudimental at V Festival 2014 (L–R): Kesi Dryden, Piers Aggett, Leon "Locksmith" Rolle and Amir Amor.

Background information
- Origin: Hackney, London, England
- Genres: Drum and bass; jungle; soul; house; electronic
- Years active: 2009–present
- Labels: Asylum; Atlantic; Black Butter
- Members: Piers Aggett; Kesi Dryden; Leon "Locksmith" Rolle
- Past members: Amir Amor
- Website: rudimental.co.uk

Rudimental are an English drum and bass band and production team, signed to Asylum Records, Atlantic Records and Black Butter Records. The band consists of Piers Aggett, Kesi Dryden and Leon "Locksmith" Rolle.

They were nominated for a Mercury Prize in 2013, and won several awards including the Brit Award, and the MOBO Award for Best Album. Rudimental also received nominations at the MTV Europe Music Awards for Best New Act, and Best UK and Ireland act. Rudimental has achieved multiple Platinum awards for record sales in several countries including in the United Kingdom and Australia.

The band rose to prominence in 2012 when their single "Feel the Love", featuring singer John Newman, topped the UK Singles Chart, and for which they were also nominated for a BRIT Award in 2013. "Feel the Love" was also used for the opening credits of the 2013 documentary movie Spark: A Burning Man Story.

The band have released further singles, including "Not Giving In", featuring Newman and Alex Clare, "Waiting All Night", featuring Ella Eyre which also topped the chart in the UK, "Right Here", featuring Foxes, "Free", featuring Emeli Sandé, and "Powerless", featuring Becky Hill. Rudimental were named by the BBC as the festival band of the summer. In 2013, Rudimental's debut studio album Home debuted at number one in the UK Albums Chart and was also nominated for a Mercury Music Prize.

== History ==
=== 2009–2011: Beginnings ===
Aggett, Dryden and Rolle have known each other from an early age, growing up on the same street and attending the same school. In regard to the name "Rudimental", Kesi Dryden said, "When I was a kid I used to go to piano lessons. There was a book called the Book of Rudiments, and my teacher would always have a go at me for forgetting it. I always used to hear 'rudiments, rudiments, where's your rudiments?' When I was a teenager, I was looking for a producer name for myself, and I would call myself 'Rudiments'. And when we started collaborating and sharing music together, Rudimental sort of felt better for a band name."

Their first release, "Sexy Sexy", with vocal contribution by Natalie May was released in 2009 along with a music video and became a regular fixture in every club DJ set and was featured on a number of big selling dance and urban compilations. 2010 saw a second song release called "Club Love", and a remix of Natalie May's "Closer". In March 2011, the band signed with Black Butter Records and released their debut single "Deep in the Valley", featuring MC Shantie. In June 2011, they released "Speeding", featuring Adiyam.

In late 2011, the band approached Amir Amor as a record producer and songwriter. This initial collaboration resulted in the songs "Feel the Love", "Not Giving In" and "Spoons". He was then subsequently asked to join the group.

=== 2012–2014: Home ===
On 20 February 2012, Rudimental released "Spoons", featuring MNEK and Syron as the debut single from their debut studio album Home.

On 14 May 2012, they released "Feel the Love", featuring vocals from John Newman, as the album's lead single. The song entered the UK Singles Chart at number one, making it their first number one single in the UK. The song also was a top-5 hit in Australia, Belgium, The Netherlands and New Zealand, also charting in Austria, Denmark, Germany and Ireland. On 18 November 2012, they released the album's second single "Not Giving In", featuring vocals from Newman and Alex Clare. It debuted and peaked at number 14 on the UK Singles Chart. "Hell Could Freeze", featuring vocals from Angel Haze, was released on 14 January 2013 as a promotional free download. "Waiting All Night", featuring Ella Eyre, was released as the third single from the album in 2013, reaching number one on the UK Singles Chart on 21 April 2013.

Home was released on 29 April 2013 and debuted at number one on the UK Albums Chart, as well as being nominated for the Mercury Music Prize. The album cover features a 'peace mural' street scene in the band's home borough of Hackney. Rudimental donated £10,000 to ensure the upkeep of the mural. The group were also nominated for three MTV EMA awards in Amsterdam in November 2013. On 19 October 2013, during the 2013 MOBO Awards in Glasgow, Rudimental received the Best Album award for Home.

As well as having toured extensively in the UK, Rudimental toured in Europe, Australia and the United States throughout 2013. In August 2013, the band were invited by Jay Z's label Roc Nation to perform at the Made in America Festival in Philadelphia. They also performed at Outsidelands in San Francisco and Future Music Festival in Australia. Rudimental kicked off 2014 with a performance on Jools Holland's annual Hootenanny. They continued in 2014 with a sell-out UK tour including three consecutive dates at the Brixton academy. The next single released was "Powerless", featuring Becky Hill. Rudimental have stated in interviews that they are writing and recording new song ideas while on the road in preparation for their second studio album. "Waiting All Night" won Rudimental the BRIT Award for Best British Single on 19 February 2014.

=== 2015–2016: We the Generation ===
Rudimental were given a writing credit on "Bloodstream" by Ed Sheeran, which appeared on his second studio album x (released 20 June 2014) and was released as a single on 11 February 2015.

On 28 April 2015, the band unveiled a new song called "Never Let You Go", which became the lead single from their upcoming second studio album. The album, released on 2 October 2015, is We the Generation.

In 2016, they released a single, featuring Joseph Angel, titled "Healing". It is more of a deep house track and differs from their previous releases.

=== 2017–2019: Toast to Our Differences and Distinction ===
The single "Sun Comes Up" featuring singer James Arthur was released on 30 June 2017.

Their second single "These Days" was released on 19 January 2018. It features vocals from Jess Glynne, Macklemore and Dan Caplen. It became their third UK number-one single after spending seven consecutive weeks at number 2. On 25 May, the band announced their third studio album Toast to Our Differences, which will feature a second collaboration with Jess Glynne (which also features Chronixx) and a collaboration with Rita Ora, "Summer Love".

In May 2019, it was announced that Rudimental would partner with Canadian vocalist Loryn for the official song of the 2019 ICC Cricket World Cup. The song, called "Stand By", was released on 17 May 2019.

On 9 August 2019, Rudimental released their debut EP, Distinction. The EP was preceded by the singles "Stigawana", "Mean That Much" and "Something About You".

=== 2020–2021: Ground Control ===
On 6 March 2020, Rudimental released the song "Krazy". On 20 March 2020, the song "Easy On Me" was released. On 4 September 2020, Rudimental released "Come Over" featuring English singer-songwriter Anne-Marie and English rapper Tion Wayne. On 10 December 2020, Rudimental released "Be the One" featuring English singer-songwriters Morgan and Tike alongside drill rapper Digga D. On 18 June 2021, Rudimental announced their fourth studio album Ground Control alongside the fourth single "Straight from the Heart" featuring Nørskov. On 3 September 2021, the band released their 16-track album Ground Control, which included a refix of their 2019 hit "Ghost".

=== 2022–present: Amor departure and Rudim3ntal ===
On 10 October 2022, the band posted on Twitter with the caption "A new era", with only three group members being shown in the image, implying Amir Amor had left the group.

On 10 November 2022, "Break My Heart" featuring uncredited vocals from English singer-songwriter L Devine premiered as BBC Radio 1's Hottest Record. In April 2023, Rudimental teamed up with Charlotte Plank and Vibe Chemistry on the single "Dancing Is Healing". The song peaked at number 5 on the UK Singles Chart. Two months later, "Die Young" with Venbee was released. On 6 October 2023, Rudimental and Clipz released "Thunderstorm" featuring Deyaz.

== Members ==
Current members

- Piers Aggett – piano, synthesizers, backing vocals (2009–present)
- Kesi Dryden – piano, bass guitar, keyboards, strings, programing, backing vocals (2009–present)
- Leon "Locksmith" Rolle – keyboards, percussion, mixing, backing vocals (2009–present)

Former members

- Amir Amor – percussion, guitar, mixing, programming, backing vocals (2011–2022)

== Discography ==
Studio albums

- Home (2013)
- We the Generation (2015)
- Toast to Our Differences (2019)
- Ground Control (2021)
- Rudim3ntal (2025)

== Tours ==
=== Main act ===
- Home Tour: 2012–14
- Wild Roots Festival Sligo: 3 June 2023

=== Opening act ===
- x Tour: July 2015
