= Feel the Love (Rudimental song) =

Single by Rudimental featuring John Newman

from the album Home
- Released: 14 May 2012
- Recorded: 2011
- Genre: Drum and bass; liquid funk; soul
- Length: 4:02
- Label: Asylum; Atlantic; Black Butter
- Songwriters: John Newman; Piers Aggett; Amir Amor; Kesi Dryden
- Producers: Rudimental; Mike Spencer

Rudimental singles chronology
"Spoons" (2012)	"Feel the Love" (2012)	"Not Giving In" (2012)

John Newman singles chronology
"Feel the Love" (2012)	"Not Giving In" (2012)

Music video
- "Feel the Love" on YouTube

"Feel the Love" is a song by British drum and bass band Rudimental. It features vocals from John Newman. It is the second single from their debut studio album, Home. The song was released in the United Kingdom on 14 May 2012 and went on to debut at the summit on the UK Singles and Dance Charts. The track was selected as BBC Radio 1 DJ Zane Lowe's Hottest Record in the World on 29 March 2012.

"Feel the Love" was featured in the 2012 video game Need for Speed: Most Wanted and in a 2013 promotional advertising for Foxtel in Australia. The song has also been used in the promo of The Pauly D Project and the Doctor Who episode "Asylum of the Daleks", as well as in the 2014 film Kingsman: The Secret Service. "Feel the Love" was also featured in the fifth episode of season four of Shoresy.

== Music video ==
A music video to accompany the release of "Feel the Love" was first released onto YouTube on 12 April 2012. It was filmed in Philadelphia, Pennsylvania and features young horseback riders and neighborhood scenes from the informal Fletcher Street Urban Riding Club, a longtime homegrown community-based program for youth. As of January 2022, it has been viewed over 100 million times.

== Chart performance ==
In the United Kingdom, "Feel the Love" debuted at number-one on the UK Singles Chart on the week ending 9 June 2012 selling 93,841 copies and becoming both Rudimental and Newman's first number one in the UK. The feat also gave Asylum Records its first number-one single in its 41-year history. On its second week, the track fell three places to number four having sold an additional 51,974 copies. The song spent eleven consecutive weeks within the UK top 10, falling nine places to number sixteen on its twelfth charting week. The song sold 619,000 copies in 2012, making it the 16th best-selling single of the year.

For the chart week dated 1 July 2012, "Feel the Love" debuted at number 42 on the Australian Singles Chart, advancing 30 places to number 12 the following week. Having climbed a further six places on its third charting week, the track reached a peak of number three on the chart week dated 15 July 2012 and has since been certified 2× Platinum by the Australian Recording Industry Association.

== Track listings ==
Digital download
No.	Title	Length
1.	"Feel the Love"	4:02
2.	"Feel the Love" (Fred V & Grafix remix)	4:48
3.	"Feel the Love" (Cutline remix)	5:22
4.	"Feel the Love" (Scuba remix)	7:11
5.	"Feel the Love" (Rudimental VIP)	6:40

== Charts ==
=== Weekly charts ===
Chart (2012–2013)	Peak position
Australia (ARIA)	3
Austria (Ö3 Austria Top 40)	14
Belgium (Ultratop 50 Flanders)	2
Belgium (Ultratip Bubbling Under Wallonia)	2
Czech Republic Airplay (ČNS IFPI)	2
Denmark (Tracklisten)	26
Germany (GfK)	59
Hungary (Rádiós Top 40)	6
Iceland (Tonlist)	23
Ireland (IRMA)	26
Netherlands (Dutch Top 40)	2
Netherlands (Single Top 100)	2
New Zealand (Recorded Music NZ)	4
Scotland Singles (OCC)	1
Slovakia Airplay (ČNS IFPI)	40
UK Dance (OCC)	1
UK Singles (OCC)	1
US Hot Dance/Electronic Songs (Billboard)	31

=== Year-end charts ===
Chart (2012)	Position
Australia (ARIA)	31
Belgium (Ultratop 50 Flanders)	25
Hungary (Rádiós Top 40)	45
Netherlands (Dutch Top 40)	15
Netherlands (Single Top 100)	24
UK Singles (OCC)	16

Chart (2013)	Position
UK Singles (OCC)	98

== Certifications ==
Region	Certification	Certified units/sales
Australia (ARIA)	3× Platinum	210,000^{^}
Belgium (BRMA)	Gold	15,000^{*}
New Zealand (RMNZ)	3× Platinum	45,000^{*}
United Kingdom (BPI)	3× Platinum	1,800,000^{‡}
Streaming
Denmark (IFPI Danmark)	Gold	900,000^{†}
Norway (IFPI Norway)	Platinum	3,000,000^{†}
^{*} Sales figures based on certification alone.^{^} Shipments figures based on certification alone.^{‡} Sales+streaming figures based on certification alone.^{†} Streaming-only figures based on certification alone.

== Release history ==
Region	Date	Format	Label
United Kingdom	14 May 2012	Digital download	Asylum; Atlantic; Black Butter
United States	25 June 2013	Mainstream radio	Asylum; Atlantic; Black Butter
