= Kidnap Kid =

Kidnap
- Birth name: Matthew Rupert Lancaster Relton
- Born: 22 February 1991 (age 34); Sheffield, South Yorkshire, England
- Genres: Electronic dance, house
- Occupation(s): Record producer, DJ
- Years active: 2011–present
- Labels: Armada Music, Birds That Fly, Anjunadeep, Black Butter, Squelch and Clap
- Website: www.facebook.com/kidnapkid

Matthew 'Matt' Rupert Lancaster Relton, known professionally as Kidnap, formerly known as Kidnap Kid, is an English electronic dance music record producer and DJ from Sheffield, South Yorkshire. He was awarded iTunes US's 'Best Electronic Song of 2012' for his track "Vehl". Relton was educated at Silverdale School in Sheffield before completing a degree in politics and crime at the University of Leeds.

Since early 2016, Relton has been releasing music through his own record label 'Birds That Fly'.

In 2017, Relton was nominated at the Electronic Music Awards for Record of the Year for "ABA" with Lane 8. He also performed at the 2017 Electronic Music Awards show.

In 2017, he changed his artist name from Kidnap Kid to Kidnap.

== Discography ==
=== Studio albums ===
- Grow (2019), Armada Music

=== Extended plays ===
- The Great Confusion (2011), Squelch and Clap
- The Apocalypse of John (2011), Squelch and Clap
- Alphaville (2012), Black Butter Records
- Moments (2016), Birds That Fly

=== Singles ===
Title	Year	Label
"Vehl"	2012	Black Butter Records
"So Close"	2013	Black Butter Records
"Survive"	2013	Black Butter Records
"Stronger"	2014	Black Butter Records
"Like You Used To"	2014	Black Butter Records
"Fall" / "Freedom"	2015	FFRR Records
"Moments / Birds That Fly"	2016	Birds That Fly
"Brokenhearted / Mist"	2016	Birds That Fly
"Aba" w/ Lane 8	2017	Anjunadeep
"Where The Sea Swings Like An Iron Gate"	2017	Anjunadeep
"Ashes"	2018	Birds That Fly
"Matcha Mistake"	2020	This Never Happened
