= Not Giving In =

Single by Rudimental featuring John Newman and Alex Clare

from the album Home
- Released: 18 November 2012
- Recorded: 2012
- Genre: Drum and bass; soul
- Length: 4:01
- Label: Asylum; Atlantic
- Songwriters: Piers Aggett; Amir Amor; Kesi Dryden; John Newman
- Producers: Rudimental; Mike Spencer

Rudimental singles chronology
"Feel the Love" (2012)	"Not Giving In" (2012)	"Waiting All Night" (2013)

John Newman singles chronology
"Feel the Love" (2012)	"Not Giving In" (2012)	"Love Me Again" (2013)

Alex Clare singles chronology
"Treading Water" (2011)	"Not Giving In" (2012)	"Hummingbird" (2012)

"Not Giving In" is a song by British drum and bass band Rudimental. It features the vocals from John Newman and Alex Clare. The song was released in the United Kingdom on 18 November 2012 as the third single from their debut studio album, Home. It came in at number 16 in the 2012 Hottest 100, announced on Australia Day 2013. It was featured in the first episode of season three of Teen Wolf. The song was also used in a 2014 FIFA World Cup commercial for Mercedes-Benz sponsoring the Germany National Football Team and official intro of MCE Insurance British Superbikes by Eurosport in 2013. The song is also featured in the Scottish Government's advertising for keeping up with COVID-19 restrictions.

== Music video ==
A music video to accompany the release of "Not Giving In", written and directed by Josh Cole, was first released onto YouTube on 17 October 2012 at a total length of five minutes and twenty-nine seconds. The video was filmed in the shanty towns of Manila, Philippines, and follows the life of two brothers growing up in poverty. The two later go their separate ways, as one manages to escape the city's underbelly and succeeds in breakdancing, whereas the other becomes trapped in a life of gang violence, drug crime and a murder, eventually resulting in his death. The video has won several awards, including best dance video at the UK MVA's and best new director at the Cannes Lions festival.

== Reception ==
=== Critical reception ===
Lewis Corner of Digital Spy gave the song a positive review stating:

Lashings of jazzy brass, twinkling piano and rumbling bass hears them picking up almost exactly where they left off. "This time I'm gonna be stronger/ I'm not giving in", John Newman declares in his smooth tone, richer than a double chocolate pud and just as satisfying. Rudimental may not have delivered a game-changer, but when your sound is still this fresh, why bother?.

== In popular culture ==
From 2014, the song has been used as the team entrance song for the Port Adelaide Football Club at home games at the redeveloped Adelaide Oval. The song was used in a Super Rugby advertising campaign for KFC in New Zealand, during the 2020 season.

=== Finnish misheard lyrics ===
The song became a meme in Finland, as "not giving in", when sung in the chorus, sounds similar to "nakkivene" which translates to "wiener boat" in Finnish. When Rudimental performed the song during Provinssirock 2014, people threw wieners with small "sails" at the stage.

== Track listings ==
iTunes digital download
No.	Title	Length
1.	"Not Giving In"	4:01
2.	"Not Giving In" (Bondax remix)	3:23
3.	"Not Giving In" (Loadstar remix)	4:13
4.	"Feel the Love" (live from BBC Radio 1's Hackney Weekend 2012)	5:35

Trackitdown digital download
No.	Title	Length
1.	"Not Giving In"	4:01
2.	"Not Giving In" (Bondax remix)	3:23
3.	"Not Giving In" (Loadstar remix)	4:13
4.	"Not Giving In" (Phaeleh remix)	5:31

Juno digital download
No.	Title	Length
1.	"Not Giving In"	4:01
2.	"Not Giving In" (Bondax remix)	3:23
3.	"Not Giving In" (Loadstar remix)	4:13
4.	"Not Giving In" (Stay+ remix)	3:46

Drum & Bass Arena digital download
No.	Title	Length
1.	"Not Giving In"	4:01
2.	"Not Giving In" (Bondax remix)	3:23
3.	"Not Giving In" (Loadstar remix)	4:13
4.	"Not Giving In" (Ed Rush remix)	5:12

Beatport digital download
No.	Title	Length
1.	"Not Giving In"	4:01
2.	"Not Giving In" (Bondax remix)	3:23
3.	"Not Giving In" (Loadstar remix)	4:13
4.	"Not Giving In" (Huxley remix)	8:31

== Charts ==
=== Weekly charts ===
Chart (2012)	Peak position
Australia (ARIA)	12
Belgium (Ultratip Bubbling Under Flanders)	4
Belgium (Ultratip Bubbling Under Wallonia)	27
Czech Republic Airplay (ČNS IFPI)	27
Hungary (Rádiós Top 40)	24
Iceland (Tonlist)	4
Netherlands (Single Top 100)	71
New Zealand (Recorded Music NZ)	11
Scotland Singles (OCC)	16
UK Dance (OCC)	1
UK Singles (OCC)	14

=== Year-end charts ===
2012 year-end chart performance for "Not Giving In"
Chart (2012)	Position
UK Singles (Official Charts Company)	188

2013 year-end chart performance for "Not Giving In"
Chart (2013)	Position
UK Singles (Official Charts Company)	163

== Certifications ==
Region	Certification	Certified units/sales
Australia (ARIA)	2× Platinum	140,000^{^}
New Zealand (RMNZ)	2× Platinum	30,000^{*}
United Kingdom (BPI)	Platinum	600,000^{‡}
Streaming
Norway (IFPI Norway)	Gold	1,500,000^{†}
^{*} Sales figures based on certification alone.^{^} Shipments figures based on certification alone.^{‡} Sales+streaming figures based on certification alone.^{†} Streaming-only figures based on certification alone.

== Release history ==
Region	Date	Format	Label
United Kingdom	18 November 2012	Digital download	Asylum; Atlantic
