= Netzwerk =

Netzwerk is the German word for "network".

It may also refer to:

- Netzwerk (film), a 1969 German film
- Netzwerk (album), an album by the electronic duo Klangkarussell
- Netzwerk (Falls Like Rain), a song by Klangkarussell released in the album Netzwerk
- Netzwerk (band), an Italian Eurodance band

== See also ==
- Network (disambiguation)
