= Nikodem Milewski =

- Occupations: Producer, mix engineer, mastering engineer
- Website: nikodemmilewski.com

Nikodem Milewski is an Austrian mix engineer, mastering engineer and music producer based in Vienna. In 2015, he won the "Amadeus Austrian Music Award" for Best Engineered Album 2015 (Klangkarussell - Netzwerk (Falls Like Rain)) for the first time.

He is an Austrian of Polish origin.

== Awards ==
- Amadeus Austrian Music Awards 2015 – Best Sound for Netzwerk by Klangkarussell
- Amadeus Austrian Music Awards 2020 – Best Sound for High Performer by 5K HD
- Amadeus Austrian Music Awards 2021 – Best Sound for Tandem by Julian le Play
- Amadeus Austrian Music Awards 2024 – Best Sound for Wiener Schickeria by Bibiza
- Amadeus Austrian Music Awards 2025 – Best Sound for Bis einer Weint by Bibiza
- Amadeus Austrian Music Awards 2026 – Best Sound for Petrichor by Klangkarussell
- Polyton Awards 2026 – Polyton Award for Universo by Giovanni Zarrella

== Discography ==
Year	Song title	Artist	Album	Credit
2025		Klangkarussell	Petrichor	Mixer, Mastering Engineer
2025	The Code, Eurostar	Nemo	Arthouse	Mixer, Mastering Engineer
2025		Leony	Oldschool Love	Mixer, Mastering Engineer
2025	Wake up with you mine	Felix Jaehn, Nasri		Mixer, Mastering Engineer
2025	Do What I Want	FILLY		Mixer, Mastering Engineer
2024	The Code (Nemo song)	Nemo		Programmer, Mixer, Mastering Engineer
2024	Simple Life	Leony		Programmer, Mixer, Mastering Engineer
2024	All We Got	Ray Dalton		Mixer, Mastering Engineer
2023	Home; Used To Love You; Cold; Long time coming; Can't fight this feeling; Parents; Reckless Eyes; Power in letting go; Bad 4 me	Emma Steinbakken	Home	Mixer, Mastering Engineer
2023		Nielson (singer)	Niels	Mixer, Mastering Engineer
2022	Remedy	Leony		Mixer, Mastering Engineer
2022	Intro; Glitch In The Simulation; Interlude; Sometimes you know	Gryffin	Alive	Mixer
2022	Beautiful World feat. Milky Chance	The Kooks	Beautiful World - Echo in the Dark, Pt. II	Mixer
2022	Summer Really Hurt Us	Alma (Finnish singer)		Mixer
2022	Until The Sun Comes Up	Milow, Skip Marley		Mixer
2021	Don't Ask Me To Change	Sophie and The Giants		Mixer, Mastering Engineer
2021	Home	Klangkarussell		Producer, Mixer, Mastering Engineer
2021	Ghost; Overthinking	Zoe Wees	Golden WIngs EP	Programmer, Mixer, Mastering Engineer
2021	No More Second Chances	Leony		Mixer, Mastering Engineer
2021	Dynamite	Ilira, VIZE		Mixer, Mastering Engineer
2021	Where The Lights Are Low	Felix Jaehn, Toby Romeo, FAULHABER		Programmer, Mixer, Mastering Engineer
2021	Plastic	Klangkarussell		Programmer, Mixer, Mastering Engineer
2021	Faded Love	Leony		Programmer, Mixer, Mastering Engineer
2020	I Just Wanna (feat. Bow Anderson)	Felix Jaehn, Cheat Codes		Programmer, Mixer, Mastering Engineer
2020	'Til I Found You	Jeremy Loops		Mixer, Mastering Engineer
2020	First Time of My Life	Milow		Programmer, Mixer, Mastering Engineer
2020	You Broke Me First (Gryffin Remix)	Tate McRae		Mixer
2020	No Therapy feat. Nea, Bryn Christopher	Felix Jaehn		Programmer, Mixer, Mastering Engineer
2020	Unbreakable feat. Clarence Coffee Jr.	BUNT.		Mixer, Mastering Engineer
2020	Never Let Me Down	VIZE & Tom Gregory		Programmer, Mixer, Mastering Engineer
2020	Some Say (Felix Jaehn Remix)	Nea		Programmer, Mixer, Mastering Engineer
2020	Sicko	Felix Jaehn, Gashi		Programmer, Mixer, Mastering Engineer
2020	Shipwreck	Klangkarussell		Programmer, Mixer, Mastering Engineer
2020	Oxygen	Robin Schulz & Winona Oak		Mixer, Mastering Engineer
2020	Heavenly Father feat. Noah Callahan	Gryffin		Mixer
2020	Ghostkeeper	Klangkarussell & GIVVEN		Programmer, Mixer, Mastering Engineer
2020	Thank You [Not So Bad]	Felix Jaehn & VIZE		Programmer, Mixer, Mastering Engineer
2019	Coming Down	Gashi, Kiddo		Mixer, Mastering Engineer
2019	Abu Dhabi	Mikolas Josef		Co-Producer, Mixer, Mastering Engineer
2019	Crazy To Love You	Decco, Alex Clare		Mixer, Mastering Engineer
2019	All The Lies	Felix Jaehn, The Vamps, Alok		Mastering Engineer
2019	You're Somebody Else (Nikodem Milewski Remix)	Flora Cash		Producer, Mixer, Mastering Engineer
2019		5K HD	High Performer	Mastering Engineer
2019	Come To Me	Zala Kralj & Gašper Šantl		Producer, Mixer, Mastering Engineer
2019	Cuba (Tiene Sabor) feat. Omara Portuondo	BUNT.		Mixer, Mastering Engineer
2019	Love on Myself	Felix Jaehn feat. Calum Scott		Mixer, Mastering Engineer
2019	Never Alone feat. VCATION	Felix Jaehn, Mesto		Mixer, Mastering Engineer
2019	Colorado	Mikolas Josef		Mixer, Mastering Engineer
2019	Close Your Eyes	Felix Jaehn & Vize feat. Miss Li		Co-Mixer, Mastering Engineer
2019	Intro; All you need to know feat. Calle Lehmann; If I Left The World feat. MARINA, Model Child; Out of my mind feat. ZOHARA; Just For A Moment feat. Iselin; You Remind Me feat. Stanaj	Gryffin	Gravity	Mixer
2018	Hot2Touch	Felix Jaehn	I	Mastering Engineer
2018	Cool (feat. Marc E. Bassy, Gucci Mane)	Felix Jaehn	I	Mastering Engineer
2018	LOV (feat. Sondr)	Felix Jaehn	I	Co-Producer, Mixer, Mastering Engineer
2018	Jennie (feat. R City, Bori)	Felix Jaehn	I	Co-Producer, Mixer, Mastering Engineer
2018	Let You Go	Bvd Kult, Olivia Trappeniers		Mixer, Mastering Engineer
2018	Lie To Me	Mikolas Josef		Programmer, Mixer, Mastering Engineer
2018	Honolulu, Forever Young (feat. Alexandra Lethi); On a Body like You; Figure You Out; Last Summer; Ain´t Nobody (feat. Jasmine Thompson); Book Of Love (feat. Polina); I Do; Eagle Eyes (feat. Lost Frequencies & Linying)	Felix Jaehn	I	Programmer, Mixer, Mastering Engineer
2017	Love in Ruins	Gryffin		Mixer, Mastering Engineer
2017	Feel Good	Felix Jaehn, Mike Williams	I	Mastering Engineer
2017	Little Hollywood	Alle Farben, Janieck		Mixer, Mastering Engineer
2016		Möwe	Back in the Summer	Producer, Mixer, Mastering Engineer
2016	Book of Love [de]	Felix Jaehn, Polina		Programmer, Mixer, Mastering Engineer
2016	Heading Home	Gryffin, Josef Salvat		Mixer, Mastering Engineer
2015		The Makemakes	The Makemakes	Mastering Engineer
2015	Almost Home (Möwe Remix)	Moby		Co-Producer, Mixer, Mastering Engineer
2015	The Nights (Felix Jaehn Remix)	Avicii		Mixer, Mastering Engineer
2015		Sam Smith	The Lost Tapes (Remixed)	Mastering Engineer
2015	Felix Jaehn feat. Jasmine Thompson	Ain’t Nobody (Loves Me Better)		Mixer, Mastering Engineer
2015	Anna Naklab feat. Alle Farben & Younotus	Supergirl		Mixer, Mastering Engineer
2014		Robin Schulz	Prayer	Mixer, Mastering Engineer
2014	No Rest for the Wicked (Klangkarussell Remix)	Lykke Li		Co-Producer, Mixer, Mastering Engineer
2014	Moments; Symmetry	Klangkarussell	Netzwerk	Co-Producer, Writer
2014	Celebrate	Klangkarussell	Netzwerk	Co-Producer
