= Cope (Freeland album) =

COPE™

Studio album by Freeland
- Released: 8 June 2009
- Genre: Electronica; electronic rock; breakbeat
- Length: 55:35
- Label: Marine Parade
- Producer: Adam Freeland; Alex Metric

Freeland chronology
Now & Them (2003)	COPE™ (2009)

Singles from COPE™
- 1. "Under Control" Released: 27 April 2009; 2. "Do You" Released: 29 June 2009; 3. "Mancry" Released: 18 August 2009; 4. "Borderline" Released: 7 September 2009

Cope (stylized as COPE™) is the second album by English DJ and record producer Adam Freeland, credited only by his surname. It was released on 8 June 2009 by Marine Parade Records. Freeland worked with Alex Metric and collaborated with artists, such as Kurt Baumann, Brody Dalle, Gerald Casale, John Ceparano and Kim Field, who contributed vocals to songs on the album.

Professional ratings
Review scores
Source	Rating
AllMusic	3.5/5 stars
BBC Music	(positive)
NME	7/10
Resident Advisor	2/5 stars
Rock Sound	6/10

== Track listing ==
No.	Title	Writer(s)	Producer(s)	Length
1.	"Do You"	Adam Freeland; Alex Metric	Freeland; Metric	3:31
2.	"Under Control"	Freeland; Metric; Kurt Baumann	Freeland; Metric	4:04
3.	"Strange Things"	Freeland; Metric; Baumann	Freeland; Metric	4:16
4.	"Bring It"	Freeland; Metric	Freeland; Metric	5:40
5.	"Mancry"	Freeland; Metric	Freeland; Metric	5:14
6.	"Borderline" (featuring Brody Dalle)	Freeland; Metric; Brody Dalle	Freeland; Metric	3:57
7.	"Rock On"	David Essex	Freeland; Metric	3:25
8.	"Silent Speaking"	Freeland; Metric; John Ceparano; Kim Field	Freeland; Metric	4:19
9.	"Best Fish Tacos in Ensenada"	Freeland; Metric	Freeland; Metric	4:17
10.	"Only a Fool (Can Die)" (featuring Gerald Casale)	Freeland; Metric; Gerald Casale	Freeland; Metric	6:12
11.	"Morning Sun"	Freeland; Metric	Freeland; Metric	5:12
12.	"Wish I Was Here"	Freeland; Metric; Baumann	Freeland; Metric	5:28
Total length:				55:35
