= Alex Metric =

British musician, producer, and DJ (born 1981)

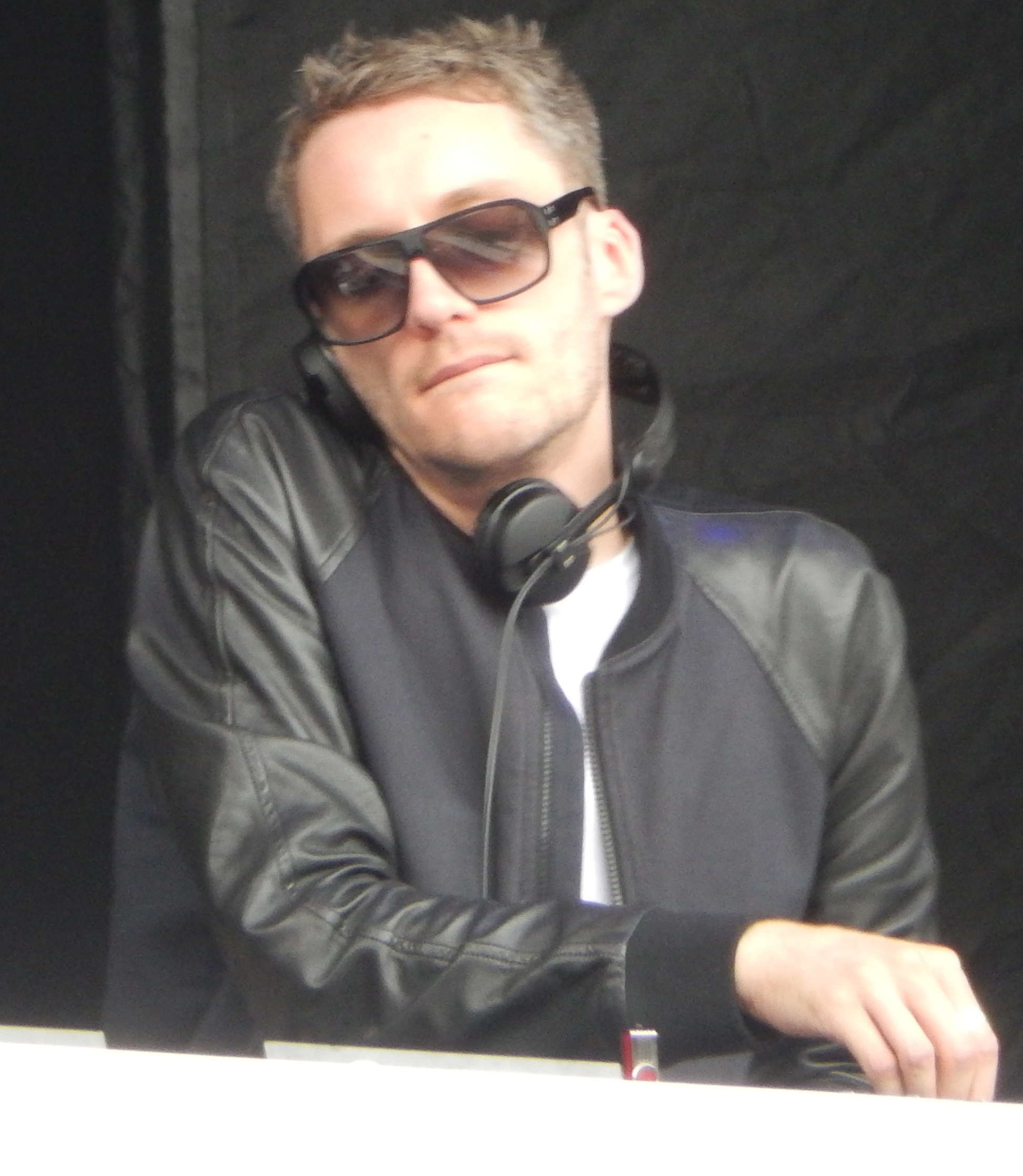
- Performing in 2014 at Spring Awakening

Background information
- Also known as: Alex Drury
- Born: 31 December 1981 (age 44)
- Origin: London, England
- Genres: House; disco house; electropop; progressive house; electro house; nu-disco
- Years active: 2006–present
- Labels: Marine Parade, Owsla, Big Beat Records, Anjunadeep
- Website: alexmetric.com

Alex Drury (born 31 December 1981), known professionally as Alex Metric, is a British musician, DJ and producer. At the 61st Annual Grammy Awards, he won a Grammy Award for Best Dance Recording for producing the Silk City and Dua Lipa song "Electricity".

== Biography ==
Alex Metric has released numerous EPs as a solo artist, and singles as a member of Metroplane and Kuu. He has remixed artists such as Daft Punk, N.E.R.D., Foals, La Roux, Pet Shop Boys, Phoenix, Gorillaz Depeche Mode and Bloc Party as well as working as a producer and writer for acts such as Mark Ronson, Dua Lipa, Avicii, Diplo, Rose Gray, Mel C, Snow Patrol, Muse, Charli XCX & The Infadels,

== Discography ==
=== Compilation albums ===
- Open Your Eyes (Remixes & Productions) (2011)

=== Singles and EPs ===
- Leave it / Stale (2005)
- Hell Yeah (2005)
- Holding (2006)
- Space hopper (2007)
- Whatshewants - EP (2007)
- Deadly on a Mission - EP (2008)
- In Your Machine - EP (2008)
- The Head Straight - EP (2009)
- It Starts - EP (2009)
- It Starts (Remixes) - EP (2009)
- "Open Your Eyes" (2011)
- End of the World - EP (2011)
- Ammunition EP (2012)
- Ammunition Pt. 2 EP (2012)
- Ammunition Pt. 3 EP (2013)
- "Safe with You" (with Jacques Lu Cont featuring Malin) (2013)
- Hope EP (2014)
- "Heart Weighs a Ton" (featuring Stefan Storm) (2014)
- Heart Weighs a Ton Remixes EP (2014)
- Ammunition Pt. 4 EP (2015)
- Ammunition Pt. 4 Remixes EP (2016)
- "Freeek" (featuring Confessionals) (2017)
- "Word of Mouth" (as Metroplane) (2017)
- "Otic" (with Ten Ven) (2018)
- "Be Where I Am" (as Metroplane) (2019)
- "Upswing" (with Amtrac) (2020)
- "How Could I Ever" (as Kuu with Riton) (2020)
- "We'll Always Have This Dance" (2020)
- "Qubit" (with Ten Ven) (2020)
- "How To Change Your Mind" EP (As Kuu with Riton) (2021)
- "Lose Control" (as Kuu With Riton) (2023)
- Space & Time EP (2023)

=== Remixes ===
- Hard Fi - "Suburban Knights"
- Autokratz - "Stay The Same"
- Splittr - "All Alone"
- Black Daniel - "Gimme What You Got"
- Locarnos - "Make Up Your Mind"
- Alphabeat - "Boyfriend"
- Reverend & The Makers - "Silence is Talking"
- Infadels - "Free Things for Poor People"
- Freeland - "Under Control"
- The Shoes - "Oh Lord"
- The Enemy - "Sing When You're In Love" (Promo Only)
- Ladyhawke - "Paris Is Burning"
- Phoenix - "Lisztomania"
- Bloc Party - "One More Chance"
- Merz - "Many Weathers Apart"
- U2 - "Crazy" (Unreleased Remix)
- Kenneth Bager - "I Can't Wait"
- Fenech-Soler - "Lies"
- La Roux - "Quicksand"
- Gorillaz - "Stylo"
- Ellie Goulding - "Salt Skin"
- Maximum Balloon - "Groove Me"
- NERD - "Hypnotize U"
- Depeche Mode - "Personal Jesus"
- Niki and The Dove - "Mother Protect"
- Pet Shop Boys - "A new bohemia"
- Sade - "Love Is Found" (Promo only)
- The Whip - "Secret Weapon"
- Miike Snow - "Devil's Work"
- The Presets - "Youth In Trouble"
- Ellie Goulding - "Anything Could Happen"
- St. Lucia - "September"
- Two Door Cinema Club - "Sun"
- Scissor Sisters - "Inevitable" (unreleased)
- Willy Moon - "Get Up" (Promo only)
- Yeah Yeah Yeahs- "Despair" (unreleased)
- Foals - "Bad Habit"
- Empire of the Sun- "DNA"
- Madeon - "You're On (ft. Kyan)"
- All Tvvins - "Darkest Ocean"
- Saint Raymond - "Young Blood" (promo only)
- Everything Everything-"Distant Past"
- Foals - "Mountain At My Gates"
- Dusky Grey - "Told Me"
- Just Kiddin - "Fall for You"
- Bad Sounds - Evil Powers
- Friendly Fires - "Love Like Waves"
- Mel - Santiago
- Silk City- "Electricity"
- Parcels-"Lightenup"
- Big Wild-"City of Sound"
- Foals-"Sunday"
- Roosevelt - Sign
- Foals - Wash Off (As Kuu)
- Victor Le Masne - Fortune Cookie
- Pet Shop Boys - A New Bohemia
- See Tai - Hey Boy

Mixes Under the "Metroplane" Alias

- Becky Hill- "Unpredictable"
- Anais-"Lost My Faith"

Bootlegs

- The Rapture - The Devil (Alex Metric Bootleg)
- Metric - Monster Hospital (Alex Metric Bootleg)
- Cassius - Sound of Violence (Alex Metric Re-Edit)
- Beastie Boys - Sabotage (Alex Metric Re-Edit)
- Blur - Song 2 (Alex Metric Festival Edit)
- Frank Ocean - White Ferrari (Alex Metric Re-Edit)

== Songwriting and production credits ==
Title	Year	Artist(s)	Album	Credits	Written with	Produced with
"Hate"	2007	Adam Freeland	The Hate EP	Co-writer/Producer	Adam Freeland	Adam Freeland
"Where's Your God Now?"	2007	Adam Freeland	The Hate EP	Co-writer/Producer	Adam Freeland	Adam Freeland
"Glowsticks"	2007	Adam Freeland	The Hate EP	Co-writer/Producer	Adam Freeland	Adam Freeland
"Under Control"	2009	Freeland	Cope	Co-writer/Producer	Adam Freeland, Kurt Baumann	Adam Freeland
"Do You"	2009	Freeland	Cope	Co-writer/Producer	Adam Freeland	Adam Freeland
"Strange Things"	2009	Freeland	Cope	Co-writer/Producer	Adam Freeland, Kurt Baumann	Adam Freeland
"Bring It"	2009	Freeland	Cope	Co-writer/Producer	Adam Freeland	Adam Freeland
"Mancry"	2009	Freeland	Cope	Co-writer/Producer	Adam Freeland	Adam Freeland
"Borderline" (featuring Brody Dalle)	2009	Freeland	Cope	Co-writer/Producer	Adam Freeland, Brody Dalle	Adam Freeland
"Rock On"	2009	Freeland	Cope	Producer	-	Adam Freeland
"Silent Speaking"	2009	Freeland	Cope	Co-writer/Producer	Adam Freeland, John Ceperano, Kim Field	Adam Freeland
"Best Fish Tacos in Ensenada"	2009	Freeland	Cope	Co-writer/Producer	Adam Freeland	Adam Freeland
"Only a Fool (Can Die)" (featuring Gerald Casale)	2009	Freeland	Cope	Co-writer/Producer	Adam Freeland, Gerald Casale	Adam Freeland
"Morning Sun"	2009	Freeland	Cope	Co-writer/Producer	Adam Freeland, Damian Taylor	Adam Freeland
"Wish I Was There"	2009	Freeland	Cope	Co-writer/Producer	Adam Freeland, Kurt Baumann	Adam Freeland
"From Out of the Black Sky"	2012	Infadels	The Future of the Gravity Boy	Producer	-	-
"The Future of the Gravity Boy"	2012	Infadels	The Future of the Gravity Boy	Producer	-	-
"Ghosts"	2012	Infadels	The Future of the Gravity Boy	Producer	-	-
"We Get Along"	2012	Infadels	The Future of the Gravity Boy	Producer	-	-
"Mercury Rising"	2012	Infadels	The Future of the Gravity Boy	Producer	-	-
"Jupiter 5"	2012	Infadels	The Future of the Gravity Boy	Producer	-	Jagz Kooner
"American Girl"	2013	Bonnie McKee	Non-album single	Co-writer	Bonnie McKee, Jonathan Asher, Oliver Goldstein, Jacknife Lee	-
"Talk to Myself" (featuring Sterling Fox)	2015	Avicii	Stories	Co-writer	Timothy Bergling, Brandon Lowry, Matthew Hartke	-
"Endisco"	2016	The Knocks	55: Japanese Edition	Co-writer	Benjamin Ruttner, James Patterson, Benjamin Berger, Ryan McMahon	-
"On What You're On"	2016	Busted	Night Driver	Co-producer	-	John Fields
"Thinking of You"	2016	Busted	Night Driver	Co-writer/Co-producer	James Bourne, Matthew Willis, Charlie Simpson, John Fields, Eric Bazilian	John Fields
"Word of Mouth" (featuring Bree Runway)	2018	Metroplane	Non-album single	Co-writer/Producer	Vito de Luca, Uzoechi Emenike, Rebecca Hill, Ryan Campbell	Metroplane, Mark Ralph
"Ginger" (with Riton)	2018	Kah-Lo	Foreign Ororo	Co-Writer / Producer	Henry Smithson, Faridah Demola-Seriki	-
"Only Can Get Better" (featuring Daniel Merriweather)	2018	Silk City	Non-album single	Co-producer	-	Mark Ronson, Diplo, The Picard Brothers, Riton, Lil Silva
"Feel About You" (featuring Mapei)	2018	Silk City	Non-album single	Producer	-	Mark Ronson, Diplo, The Picard Brothers, Magnus Lidehäll, Jr Blender
"Electricity" (with Dua Lipa)	2018	Silk City	Non-album single	Additional producer	-	Mark Ronson, Diplo, The Picard Brothers, Jarami, Riton, Jr Blender
"Runway"	2018	Duke Dumont	Non-album single	Producer	-	Duke Dumont
"Heaven Let Me In"	2018	Friendly Fires	TBA	Additional producer	-	Friendly Fires, Disclosure, Hal Ritson, Mark Ralph, Richard Adlam
"High Heels"	2019	Melanie C	TBA	Producer	Melanie C, Rae Morris, Fryars	-
"New Love" ft Ellie Goulding	2021	Silk City	Non album single	Producer		Mark Ronson, Diplo, The Picard Brothers, Riton
"Don't Be Afraid"	2021	Diplo & Damian Lazarus ft Jungle		Producer		Diplo, Vito De Luca,
"Ecstacy"	2023	Rose Gray	Non album Single	Co writer and Producer	Rose Gray	
"Love Letter"	2022	Odessa		Co writer	Odesza, The Knocks, Hannah Yadi	
"Sugar"	2024	Chloe Caillet		Co Writer and Co producer	Chloe Caillet	Chloe Caillet
"Wish You Knew"	2024	Carlita	Sentimental	Co Writer and Co producer	Carlita, DJ Tennis, Joe Ashworth	Carlita, DJ Tennis, Joe Ashworth
"Tectonic"	2025	Rose Gray	Louder Please	Co writer & Producer	Rose Gray	Ewan Pearson, Rob Milton
"Run With It"	2025	KILIMANJARO		Co Writer and Co producer	KILIMANJARO	KILIMANJARO
"April"	2025	Rose Gray	A little louder please	Co writer and Producer	Rose Gray	
"Lotus"	2025	Rose Gray	A Little louder please	Co writer and Co Producer	Rose Gray, Twin Lee	Twin Lee
"Attitude"	2026	Mel C		Co writer & Producer	Mel C, Clementine Douglas	
Undressed	2026	Just For Fun		Co Writer and Co Producer	Just For Fun	Just For Fun
