= FabricLive.28 =

Compilation album by Evil Nine
- Released: July 25, 2006
- Genre: Electronica
- Length: 1:13:20
- Label: Fabric

Evil Nine chronology
You Can Be Special Too (2004)	FabricLive.28 (2006)

FabricLive chronology
FabricLive.27 (2006)	FabricLive.28 (2006)	FabricLive.29 (2006)

FabricLive.28 is a mix album by English electronic music duo Evil Nine. It was released in 2006 on the Fabric label, as part of the FabricLive albums series.

== Track listing ==
1. Will Saul Ft. Ursula Rucker - Where Is It? (Evil Nine Remix) - Air - 6:33
2. Simian Mobile Disco - Click - Simian Mobile Disco – 2:54
3. Uffie - Ready To Uff (Dub) - Ed Banger – 2:32
4. Bodyrockers - Round and Round (Switch Remix) - Mercury – 4:58
5. Riton - Anger Man (Riton Re-Rub) - Riton – 3:38
6. The Mystery Jets - The Boy Who Ran Away (Riton Extended Dub) - 679 – 4:32
7. Thomas Schumacher - Kickschool 79 Spiel-Zeug – 5:05
8. Paul Woolford Presents Bobby Peru - Erotic Discourse - 2020 Vision – 3:52
9. Boys Noize - Volta 82 - Boys Noize – 3:45
10. Bassbin Twins - The Dogs - Bassbin Records – 5:05
11. John Starlight - John's Addiction - Television – 5:05
12. Daft Punk - Technologic (Digitalism's Highway to Paris Remix) - Virgin – 4:54
13. Franz Ferdinand - The Fallen (Justice remix) - Domino – 3:09
14. The Kreeps - All I Wanna Do is Break Some Hearts (Boys Noize Remix 2) - Output – 2:54
15. Test Icicles - What's Your Damage? (Digitalism Remix) – 5:05
16. B-Movie - Nowhere Girl (Freeland Remix) - Some Bizzare – 5:49
17. The Clash - London Calling (song) - Sony BMG – 3:30
