= They Live (disambiguation) =

They Live is a 1988 American science-fiction action thriller film.

They Live may also refer to:

- They Live (Calico System album), 2005
- They Live (Evil Nine album), 2008
- They Live (soundtrack), a soundtrack for the film
