= Network provider =

Network provider may refer to:

- Communications service provider, general term for service providers which transport information electronically
- Internet service provider
- Network service provider, which provides direct Internet backbone access to internet service providers
- Wireless service provider

== See also ==
- Network (disambiguation)
