= We Want Your Soul =

Single by Adam Freeland

from the album Now & Them
- Released: September 1, 2003
- Label: Marine Parade Records
- Songwriters: Adam Freeland, Damian Taylor
- Producers: Adam Freeland, Damian Taylor

Adam Freeland singles chronology
"We Want Your Soul" (2003)	"Supernatural Thing" (2003)

"We Want Your Soul" is a single by British DJ and producer Adam Freeland. The track peaked at number 35 in the UK Singles Chart upon release in September 2003 and won awards for the accompanying music video. Freeland described the song as being "about the destructive side of consumer culture".

== Production ==
"We Want Your Soul" was the first track for which Freeland wrote the lyrics. The song's verses are spoken by a speech synthesizer, and it also features a sample of Bill Hicks. The song has been remixed by drum and bass duo Ed Rush & Optical, electronic band Product.01 and Australian dance trio Infusion.

Austrian electronic music duo Klangkarussell created a remix of the song, released in 2011 through the duo's SoundCloud profile before being including in their 2014 debut album Netzwerk.

== Use in advertising ==
Freeland stated that the Target Corporation had sought to license "We Want Your Soul" for use in an advertising campaign, which he refused.

== Track listings ==
CD single

1. We Want Your Soul (Radio Edit) – 3:00
2. We Want Your Soul (Product 01 Remix) – 4:46
3. We Want Your Soul (Infusion Remix) – 6:16
4. We Want Your Soul (Ed Rush & Optical Remix) - 5:50

12" single

1. We Want Your Soul (Club Mix)
2. We Want Your Soul (Acapella)
3. We Want Your Soul (Lock Grooves)

Remix 12"

1. We Want Your Soul (Ed Rush & Optical Remix)
2. We Want Your Soul (Infusion Remix)
