= Mustang Wanted =

Ukrainian urban climber and Internet celebrity

- Born: Pavlo Gennadiyovich Ushivets (Ukrainian: Павло Геннадійович Ушивець; January 21, 1987 (age 39); Kyiv, Ukraine
- Citizenship: Ukrainian
- Known for: Urban climbing, Internet celebrity

Pavlo Gennadiyovich Ushivets (Ukrainian: Павло Геннадійович Ушивець born 21 January 1987), better known as Mustang Wanted, is a Ukrainian urban climber and Internet celebrity. He is known for the high-altitude stunts he performs around the world with little or no safety equipment.

== Biography ==
Ushivets was born in Kyiv, Ukraine and identifies as Heorhiy (or Grigory). He lives in Kyiv.

In September 2023, during the Russian invasion of Ukraine, Ushivets revealed on Instagram that he was serving in the Armed Forces of Ukraine in a combat role.

=== Urban climbing ===
He has climbed Vienna's Votivkirche, Princess Tower in Dubai and Most SNP in Bratislava.

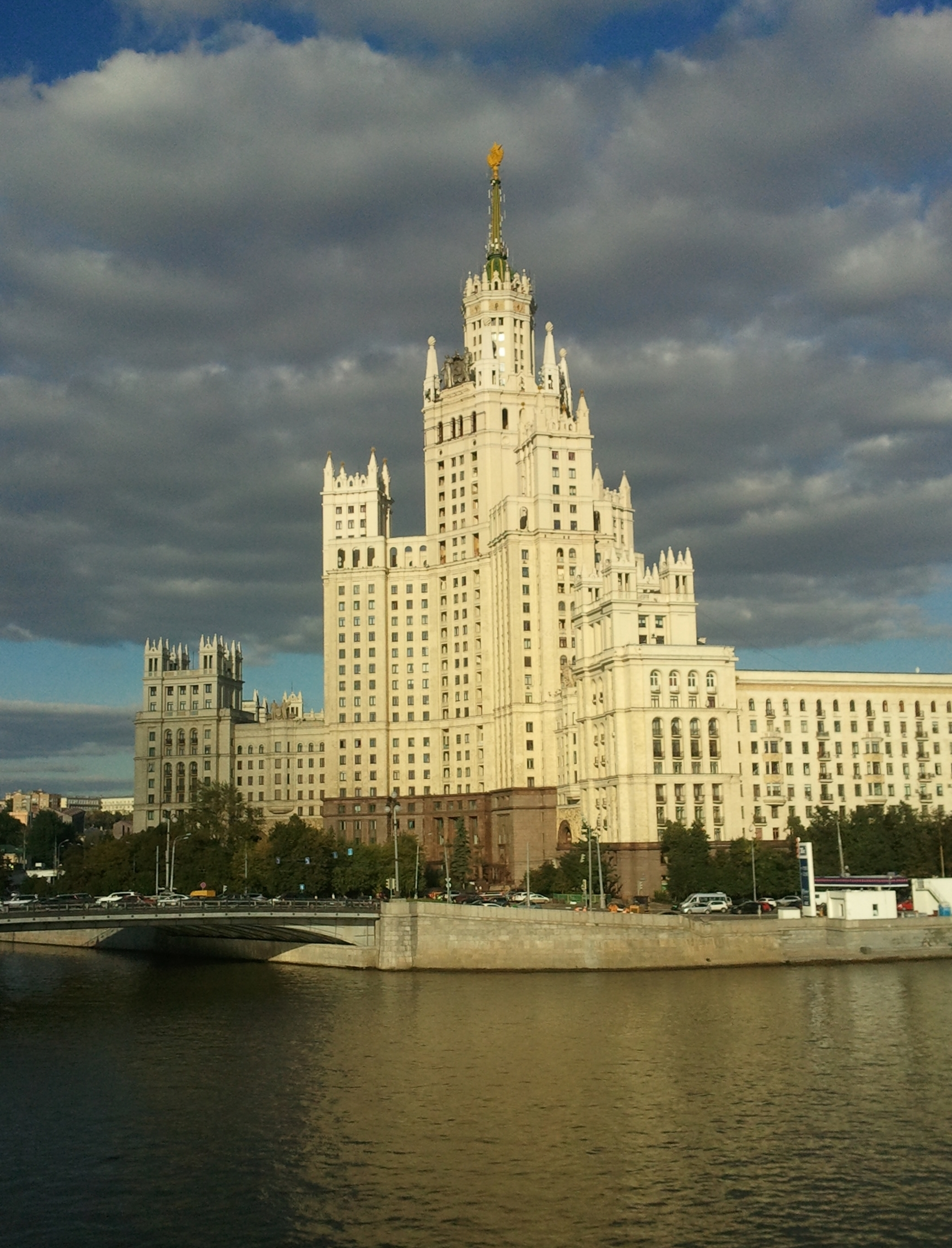
In August 2014, Mustang Wanted climbed Kotelnicheskaya Embankment Building in Moscow, painted the upper half of the star at the top of the building in blue and raised the Ukrainian flag above it.

On 19–20 August 2014, he climbed Kotelnicheskaya Embankment Building, one of the Seven Sisters (a group of skyscrapers in Moscow designed in the Stalinist style), painted the spire in blue and raised the Ukrainian flag on the top of the building. He dedicated the performance to Independence Day of Ukraine (celebrated on 24 August). He suggested online that he was willing to be arrested by Russian police in exchange for the release of Ukrainian pilot Nadya Savchenko, who was captured by pro-Russian forces in eastern Ukraine and abducted to Russia. He received the 2014 Troublemaker Award for this stunt.

In September 2016, Ushivets attended the Toronto Film Festival, where he participated in the announcement of a new film based on his exploits and those of three Russian climbers. The film title is We Kill Death, and it will be produced by Alex Ginzburg and Tony Lee.

In August 2017, Ushivets, during an interview with the Russian service of Radio Free Europe/Radio Liberty, announced that he will not do any more "provocative stunts" in Russia.

== Filmography ==
- Netzwerk (Falls Like Rain) (2014) – music video for the band Klangkarussell
- Don't Look Down (Channel 4, 2014)

== Awards ==
- Commemorative Fire-arm (2014), for painting the star on the Kotelnicheskaya Embankment Building
