= Soul Trader =

Studio album by Ils
- Released: 7 January 2002
- Genre: Electronica
- Label: Marine Parade, Myutopia
- Producer: Ils

Ils chronology
Idiots Behind the Wheel (1999)	Soul Trader (2002)	Bohemia (2005)

Singles from Soul Trader
- 1. "Next Level" Released: 11 February 2002; 2. "No Soul" Released: 17 June 2002; 3. "Music" Released: 9 December 2002

Alternate cover
- US version

Soul Trader is the second studio album by English electronic music producer ils. It was originally released in the UK on 7 January 2002, followed by a US release on 5 August 2003. The album's release was succeeded with the release of three singles; "Next Level", "No Soul", and "Music" on Marine Parade Records in 2002. "Next Level" reached #75 in the UK Singles Chart and was included on the album as "6 Space (Next Level)".

== Background ==
Following Walker's departure with Fuel Records following the release of Idiots Behind the Wheel, he signed with Marine Parade and released Soul Trader on 7 January 2002. Following this, three singles were released through Marine Parade, "Next Level", "No Soul", and "Music", to commercial success, with all three singles charting in the UK, at positions #75, #82, and #98 respectively.

On 5 August 2003, Myutopia Recordings released a US version of the album, featuring a different album cover and two exclusive bonus tracks. Myutiopa also released a DVD version of the album (featuring bonus music videos) on 14 August 2006.

== Track listing ==
No.	Title	Length
1.	"6 Space (Next Level)"	5:43
2.	"Are You Ready?"	5:44
3.	"Prohibition"	4:05
4.	"Only Way to Survive"	4:03
5.	"Find a Way"	5:59
6.	"Western World"	4:01
7.	"No Soul"	5:21
8.	"Feel Alright"	5:35
9.	"Kashmir"	5:29
10.	"Music"	5:46
11.	"Jackpot"	5:15
12.	"Trapped"	4:40

US Bonus Tracks
No.	Title	Length
13.	"No Soul (High Contrast Mix)"	7:35
14.	"Music (Evil Nine Punk Rocks Mix)"	6:21

== Release history ==
Country	Date	Label	Format
UK	7 January 2002	Marine Parade	Digital download
UK	1 July 2002	Marine Parade	CD
UK	1 July 2002	Marine Parade	Vinyl
US	5 August 2003	Myutopia	CD
US	5 August 2003	Myutopia	Digital download
US	14 August 2006	Myutopia	DVD
