= Network =

Network, networking and networked may refer to:

== Science and technology ==
=== Mathematics ===
- Networks, a graph with attributes studied in network theory
  - Scale-free network, a network whose degree distribution follows a power law
  - Small-world network, a mathematical graph in which most nodes are not neighbors, but have neighbors in common
- Flow network, a directed graph where each edge has a capacity and each edge receives a flow

=== Biology ===
- Biological network, any network that applies to biological systems
- Ecological network, a representation of interacting species in an ecosystem
- Neural network, a network or circuit of neurons

=== Technology and communication ===
- Artificial neural network, a computing system inspired by animal brains
- Broadcast network, radio stations, television stations, or other electronic media outlets that broadcast content from a centralized source
  - News network
  - Radio network, including both broadcast and two-way communications
  - Television network, used to distribute television program content
- Electrical network, an interconnection of electrical components
- Social networking service, an online platform that people use to build social networks
- Telecommunications network, allowing communication between separated nodes
  - Computer network or data network, a digital telecommunications network
    - Network hardware, such as a network switch or networking cable
    - Wireless network, a computer network using wireless data connections
- Network (typeface), used on the transport network in the West Midlands, UK

=== Sociology and business ===
- Social network, in social science research
  - Scientific collaboration network, a social network wherein nodes are scientists and links are co-authorships
- Social group, a network of people
- Network of practice, a social science concept
- Business networking, the sharing of information or services between people, companies or groups
- Personal networking, the practice of developing and maintaining a personal network
- Supply network, a pattern of temporal and spatial processes carried out at facility nodes and over distribution links
- Transport network, a network in geographic space

=== Other uses in science and technology ===
- Network theory, the study of graphs as a representation of relations between discrete objects
- Network science, an academic field that studies complex networks

== Arts, entertainment and media ==
- Network (1976 film), a 1976 American film
- Network (2019 film), an Indian film
- Network (album), 2004, by Saga
- Network (comics), a series of Marvel Comics characters
- Network (play), 2017, based on the 1976 film
- Network (TV series), a Canadian variety television series
- Network (video game), a 1980 business simulation game for the Apple II
- Network, aka Taryn Haldane, a fictional character and member of the Sovereign Seven comic book series
- Network, the members' newsletter of the British Sociological Association
- The Network, an American new wave band
- "The Network", a 1987 Matlock episode
- The Network, a fictional organization in the comic strip Modesty Blaise
- "Networking", a song by We Are the Physics from We Are the Physics Are OK at Music

== Organizations ==
- Network International, a UAE-based payment service provider
- NETWORK (Slovak party), a political party in Slovakia
- Network (lobby group), an American social justice group
- The Network (group of churches), an international group of evangelical churches
- The Network (political party), an Italian political party (1991–1999)
- The Network (professional wrestling), a professional wrestling stable
- The Network 2018, an Italian political party (2011–present)
- Network (Russia), allegedly an anti-government anarchist organization active in Russia in 2015–2017

== See also ==
- List of university networks
- Nettwerk, Nettwerk Music Group, a record label
- Netzwerk (disambiguation)
- Networked: The New Social Operating System, a 2012 book
