= Evil Nine =

English electronic music duo

- Origin: Brighton, England
- Genres: Big beat; electronic; breakbeat
- Years active: 1998–present
- Labels: For Lovers, Marine Parade
- Members: Tom Beaufoy; Pat Pardy

Evil Nine are an English electronic music duo comprising members Tom Beaufoy and Pat Pardy. Their musical style is primarily classified as breakbeat, although it additionally encompasses other influences.

== Biography ==
The duo first came together in 1998 after meeting in Brighton. After sending in a demo cassette they were signed by Adam Freeland to his Marine Parade record label, with their first release being the single "Less Stress". According to Beaufoy (in an interview given to Fabric Nightclub) part of the reason that their demo cassette tape was actually listened to rather than thrown away (by 1998 cassettes had become virtually obsolete in favour of CDs) was because of their friendship with Jemma Griffiths, who worked for Marine Parade at the time. She has since gone on to achieve chart success as a singer-songwriter under the stage name "Jem".

After further single releases, their debut album You Can Be Special Too was released to critical acclaim in 2004, winning the breakspoll 2004 award for best album. Prior to the release of You Can Be Special Too, Marine Parade suffered financial difficulties as a result of one of its distributors going into liquidation. This resulted in only 1000 copies of the album making it into stores initially, causing it to be a highly sought after item on eBay. The record eventually had a full release in greater numbers after the financial problems had subsided. The album featured collaborations with Aesop Rock and Juice Aleem, amongst others. The album track "Hired Goons" features in the video game Test Drive Unlimited.

In addition to their own material, Evil Nine has also released two albums for the Y4K and fabric mix series (see FabricLive.28), as well as producing remixes for dance artists including Adam Freeland, Timo Maas, Ils and UNKLE.

The pair has developed a reputation amongst both fans and critics as not being afraid to push the boundaries of what is considered breakbeat music, and tend to incorporate a multitude of styles into their DJ sets. An example of this is the track listing for Fabriclive 28, which includes artists as diverse as Simian Mobile Disco, Bodyrockers, Mystery Jets, and The Clash.

As well as regularly playing at various nightclubs both in the UK and Europe they have held residencies at fabric Nightclub in London and Audio in Brighton, and they currently hold the position of "Super-Residents" at Urban Gorilla in Sheffield.

On 24 April 2008 Evil Nine announced the completion of their second album. The album is titled 'They Live!' and was released in October 2008, preceded by the first single, the title track 'They Live!' on 4 August. The song "Crooked" from the second album received a rare, fully Flash animated music video and appeared in the video game Midnight Club: Los Angeles.

In May 2009, Evil Nine released The Power ep on Adam Freeland's Marine Parade label and the single No Manners featuring Spoek Mathambo in early 2010. The duo then launched their own record label, 'For Lovers' For Lovers on which they have so far released the singles Ultimo and Stay Up and Auto EP. In 2011 they released a single 'Little Prince' / 'Roar' on Bad Life Records.

== Discography ==
=== Albums ===
- You Can Be Special Too (2004, Marine Parade Records)
- They Live! (2008, Marine Parade Records)
- The Power EP
- Broken Dreams EP (2012)
- New Girl EP (2014)

=== Mix compilation album appearances ===
- Evil Nine Present: Y4K (October 2005, Distinct'ive Records)
- FabricLive.28 (July 2006, Fabric Records)

=== Singles ===
- "Less Stress/Special Move" - Marine Parade
- "Technology/Big Game Hunter" - Marine Parade
- "Cakehole" - Marine Parade
- "For Lovers Not Fighters" - Marine Parade
- "Restless" (feat. Toastie Taylor) - Marine Parade (21 June 2004)
- "Crooked" (feat. Aesop Rock) - Marine Parade (4 October 2004)
- "Pearl Shot" (feat. Juice Aleem) - Marine Parade (4 July 2005)
- "They Live!" - Marine Parade (4 August 2008)
- "All The Cash (feat. EL-P)" - Marine Parade (1 December 2008)
- "No Manners (feat. Spoek Mathambo)" - Marine Parade
- "Ultimo" - For Lovers
- "Stay Up" - For Lovers
- "Auto" - For Lovers
- "Little Prince / Roar" - Bad Life
