= Infadels =

British indie electronic band

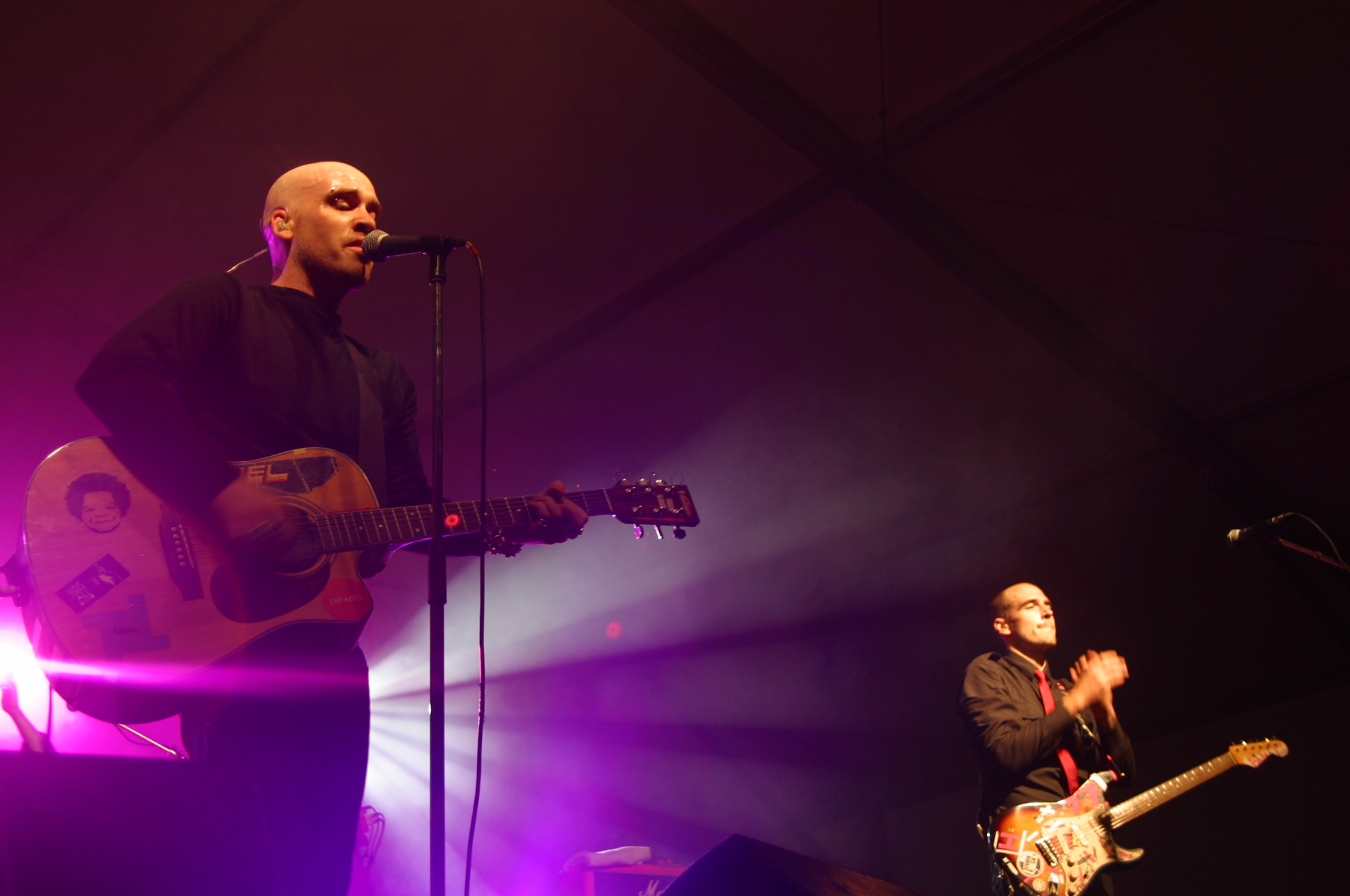
- Infadels in Brest, France, 2006

Background information
- Origin: Hackney, London, UK
- Genres: Indie rock Electronic; Electroclash
- Years active: 2003–2012
- Labels: Wall of Sound (UK)
- Members: Bnann (Danny) Watts; Matt Gooderson; Wag Marshall-Page; Richie Vernon; Alex Bruford

Infadels were a London-based indie-electro band signed to the Wall of Sound record label. Infadels were founded in 2003 by Alex Bruford (drums), Matt Gooderson (guitar, programming) and Bnann Watts (vocals), who were joined shortly afterwards by Dead at Thirty founder Richie Vernon (live keys) and Wag Marshall-Page (Bass).

Their debut album, We Are Not the Infadels, was produced by Jagz Kooner and released in January 2006. A second album, the Martin "Youth" Glover produced Universe In Reverse, was released in June 2008. Their third album, The Future of the Gravity Boy, was released digitally on 19 March, and physically on 9 June 2012.

== History ==
The band released two singles, "Leave Your Body" and "Can't Get Enough"/"Murder That Sound", on their own record label, Dead at Thirty. The band sent a copy of "Leave Your Body" to John Peel who played it on his Radio 1 show, while "Can't Get Enough" which reached No. 43 on the UK charts. They won awards for "Best Live Act" and "Best Dance Band" at the 2004 Diesel-U-Music Awards. One of the judges was Wall of Sound boss Mark Jones, who immediately offered the band a deal. "Can't Get Enough" was later remixed by Wall of Sound producer John Gosling and released on the FIFA 07 album, as well as part of the Gran Turismo 4 soundtrack

In January 2005, the Infadels headed into the studio with producer Jagz Kooner to record their debut album, We Are Not the Infadels. The band supported the release with an almost constant touring schedule with over 150 shows in 20 countries in 2006 alone. This included two UK tours, three European tours, two Australian tours, a number of shows in the USA & China and 35 festival dates.

The band's second album, Universe In Reverse, was released in June 2008 and written largely by Watts and Gooderson, and produced by Martin "Youth" Glover (Verve, Guns ’n’ Roses, Depeche Mode). "Play Blind", the first single from the second album, was given away for free as a limited-time download in February 2008. Next single "Make Mistakes", was released in April, and "Free Things For Poor People" was released in June 2008, reaching No. 1 on the UK Indie Singles Charts and No. 52 on the UK Singles Chart. On Monday 19 August they were voted best band at the 2008 Lowlands festival by the Dutch public ahead of Editors and N.E.R.D.

In November 2009 a new track, "Ghosts" was aired on Radio 1 by Alex Metric and backed up rumours of a return to the dance inspired sound of their debut album We Are Not the Infadels. Following this, Metric offered to produce their next record. In January 2010, the band confirmed that Metric would indeed be on production duties for their new album. Also produced by Matt Gooderson, The Future of the Gravity Boy was finally released in 2012. The band released a video for "From Out of the Black Sky" in July 2012. This would be the last video the band would make, as in September 2012 the band announced via Twitter that they had disbanded.

After a long period of silence, the band announced that We Are Not the Infadels would be reissued digitally on 18 November 2016 to celebrate ten years since its initial release.

== Members ==
- Bnann (Danny) Watts – vocals
- Matt Gooderson – guitars/programming
- Wag (Wayne) Marshall-Page – bass (half of Banks & Wag)
- Richie Vernon – live keys
- Alex Bruford – drums (son of Bill Bruford)

== Discography ==
=== Albums ===
- We Are Not the Infadels (30 January 2006)
- Universe In Reverse (23 June 2008)
- The Future of the Gravity Boy (19 March 2012)

=== Singles ===
- "Leave Your Body" (Autumn 2003)
- "Can't Get Enough"/"Murder That Sound" (3 May 2004) UK No. 43
- "Jagger '67" (26 September 2005)
- "Give Yourself to Me (Reality TV)" (25 April 2005)
- "Can't Get Enough" (23 January 2006)
- "Love Like Semtex" (5 June 2006) UK No. 78
- "Girl That Speaks No Words" (9 October 2006)
- "Make Mistakes" (21 April 2008)
- "Free Things For Poor People" (16 June 2008) UK No. 52
- "A Million Pieces" (1 September 2008)
- "Ghosts" (19 April 2010)
- "From Out of the Black Sky" (2012)
