= Bohemia (Ils album) =

Studio album by Ils
- Released: 9 May 2005
- Genre: Electronic
- Label: Distinct'ive Records
- Producer: Ils

Ils chronology
Soul Trader (2002)	Bohemia (2005)	Bohemia - Remixes & Exclusives (2007)

Bohemia is the third studio album by English electronic music producer Ils. It was released by Distinct'ive Records on 9 May 2005, with a following remix album, Bohemia - Remixes & Exclusives releasing two years later.

== Track listing ==
1. "Intro (Reprise)" - 2:09
2. "Tiny Toy" - 5:41
3. "Angels" - 5:25
4. "Cherish" - 4:43
5. "Feed the Addiction" - 4:38
6. "Ill-Logic" - 5:51
7. "Storm from the East" - 5:59
8. "Precious" - 3:32
9. "Razorblade" - 4:16
10. "The World Is Yours" - 3:42
11. "Loving You" - 4:13
12. "West Coast" - 5:16
13. "Over My Head" - 4:57

== In other media ==
The song "Feed the Addiction" appeared in the 2005 video game Need For Speed: Most Wanted.

The song "Intro (Reprise)" was featured in the 2006 video game Driver: Parallel Lines.

The songs “Tiny Toy”, “III - Logic” and “West Coast” appear in Saints Row.
