= Idiots Behind the Wheel =

Studio album by Ils
- Released: 9 August 1999
- Genre: Electronic, breakbeat
- Label: Fuel Records
- Producer: Ils

Ils chronology
Idiots Behind the Wheel (1999)	Soul Trader (2002)

Idiots Behind the Wheel is the debut studio album by English electronic music producer Ils. It was released by Fuel Records on 9 August 1999 on CD and vinyl.

== Track listing ==
=== CD ===
1. "Lights" 4:03
2. "Revolver" 6:13
3. "Sabotage" 5:36
4. "About That Time" 6:26
5. "8 Ace" 4:59
6. "Greyhound" 6:32
7. "Strange Light" 6:29
8. "A Word from the President" 1:44
9. "Full Tilt" 2:01
10. "Edge Note" 4:53
11. "No 84" 5:29
12. "Flame Out" 3:29

=== Vinyl ===
1. "Lights" 4:03
2. "Revolver" 6:13
3. "Greyhound" 6:32
4. "Sabotage" 5:36
5. "No 84" 5:29
6. "About That Time" 6:26
7. "Full Tilt" 2:01
8. "Strange Light" 6:29
9. "Edge Note" 4:53
