= Will Heard =

English singer-songwriter (born 1991)

- Born: William James Heard; 26 April 1991 (age 35); Wandsworth, London, England
- Genres: Soul; jazz; pop
- Occupations: Singer; songwriter
- Instruments: Vocals; saxophone; guitar; piano; bass
- Years active: 2013–present
- Website: www.willheard.com

William James Heard (born 26 April 1991) is an English singer–songwriter. In August 2013, he was featured on Klangkarussell's single "Sonnentanz (Sun Don't Shine)" which had peaked at number three on the UK Singles Chart and number eighteen in the Republic of Ireland. In January 2014, he was featured on Australian DJ house group The Aston Shuffle's single "Tear It Down" and had worked with them on their single "Comfortable" previously. Heard has had an active music career since 2011, performing residencies as a singer-songwriter.

== Music career ==
=== 2013–2016: Breakthrough ===
He was featured on Klangkarussell's single "Sonnentanz (Sun Don't Shine)" which was released in the United Kingdom on 18 August 2013. On 21 August 2013, the song was at number two on the Official Chart Update in the UK. On 22 August 2013, the song entered the Irish Singles Chart at number 77, peaking at number 23. On 25 August 2013, the song entered the UK Singles Chart at number three and the UK Dance Chart at number two. Heard has been working with MTA Records signee Elli Ingram, providing saxophone and backing vocals.

=== 2017–present: Trust EP ===
On 17 February 2017, Heard released his debut EP Trust. It was preceded by the lead single "Beep Me" which premiered on 1 February. It was written by Melvin Barcliff, Tim Mosley and Melissa Elliott. A music video for the opening track "I Better Love You" was premiered on 8 March on his Vevo YouTube channel.

== Discography ==
=== Studio albums ===
Title	Album details
Wild	Released: 3 November 2023; Label: UnderHeard Records; Formats: Digital download, streaming

=== EPs ===
Title	EP details
Trust	Released: 1 February 2017; Label: Black Butter Limited; Formats: Digital download, streaming

=== Singles ===
==== Solo ====
Title	Year	Album
"I Better Love You"	2017	Trust
"Fallin' 4 U"	2017	Non-album singles
"I'd Like You for Christmas"	2022	Non-album singles
"Flashlight"	2023	Wild
"Wasteman	2023	Wild
"What Do You Do"	2023	Wild
"Honey Child"	2023	Wild

==== As featured artist ====
Title	Year	Peak chart positions		Certifications	Album
Title	Year	UK	IRE	Certifications	Album
"Sonnentanz (Sun Don't Shine)" (Klangkarussell featuring Will Heard)	2013	3	18	BPI: 2× Platinum	Netzwerk
"Comfortable" (The Aston Shuffle featuring Will Heard)	2013	—	—		Photographs
"I Can't Keep Up" (Tourist featuring Will Heard)	2014	—	—		Patterns EP
"Nothing Left" (Kygo featuring Will Heard)	2015	79	97		Cloud Nine
"I Will for Love" (Rudimental featuring Will Heard)	2015	180	—		We the Generation
"Rumour Mill" (Rudimental featuring Anne-Marie and Will Heard)	2015	67	—	BPI: Silver	We the Generation
"Anywhere" (Dillon Francis featuring Will Heard)	2016	—	—		TBA

=== Guest appearances ===
Title	Year	Other Artists	Album
"Moments"	2014	Klangkarussell	Netzwerk
"Go Far"	2015	Rudimental	We the Generation
"Treading on Water"	2015	Rudimental, Sinead Harnett	We the Generation
"Run"	2015	Rudimental	We the Generation
"Day 3: When You Want to Love"	2017	Tom Misch	5 Day Mischon EP
"La Ritournelle"	2017	Pete Tong, Jules Buckley, Heritage Orchestra	Ibiza Classics
"WHAT DO I DO"	2022	Slom	Weather Report
