= Back to Mine: Pet Shop Boys =

Mixtape by Pet Shop Boys
- Released: 25 April 2005
- Recorded: 1982–2005
- Genres: Synth-pop, disco house (disc 1); Classical, ambient, IDM (disc 2)
- Length: 119:25
- Label: Dance Music Collective
- Compilers: Chris Lowe (disc 1); Neil Tennant (disc 2)

Pet Shop Boys chronology
PopArt (2003)	Back to Mine: Pet Shop Boys (2005)	Battleship Potemkin (2005)

Back to Mine chronology
Back to Mine: Carl Cox (2005)	Back to Mine: Pet Shop Boys (2005)	Back to Mine: Adam Freeland (2005)

Professional ratings
Review scores
Source	Rating
AllMusic	4/5 stars

Back to Mine: Pet Shop Boys, compiled by synth-pop duo Pet Shop Boys, is the twentieth compilation album in the Back to Mine series published by Dance Music Collective.

== Background and compilation ==
The band's only condition for undertaking the project was that each member would be allotted his own disc — a first for the series. Each disc, consequently, reflects the most opposite extremes of members Chris Lowe and Neil Tennant's musical preferences. Tennant has suggested that the two discs, in combination, comprise the "Pet Shop Boys sound".

While most other installments of the series focused on various aspects of downtempo and chillout, Lowe's disc is oriented around upbeat disco music. Tennant's disc, meanwhile, with classical and ambient music included, is more aligned with the series' overall style (though the inclusion of classical compositions is also relatively novel for the series).

Both discs include a song by Dusty Springfield, in tribute to the singer's considerable link to the band's history; as fans of Springfield's work, Tennant and Lowe collaborated with her on several projects in the late 1980s and early 1990s.

"Passion", produced by the band's first producer Bobby Orlando, is cited by Lowe as one of the key reasons for the existence of the band, as the duo's appreciation for that and other Orlando productions led to Tennant's meeting with Orlando in New York.

Lobe and Dettinger would later produce remixes for the limited edition of the band's 2006 album, Fundamental.

== Artwork ==
The album cover is by the band's traditional designer Mark Farrow, differentiating it from the series' usual appearance. Gary Stillwell created the cover art by tracing and simplifying an existing photograph of Lowe and Tennant using Adobe Illustrator. Lowe's clothes and hair were rendered in bright colours in contrast to Tennant's muted look. The key in Tennant's hand was added to give the impression that the listener had been invited "back to mine" by the duo and would be let in the door.

== Critical reception ==
AllMusic reviewer Andy Kellman rated the compilation album four out of five stars, calling it "one of the better volumes in the Back to Mine series. The approaches to their respective sets couldn't be more different, yet both prove to be mostly effective".

== Track listing ==
Disc one (Chris Lowe)
No.	Title	Original artist(s)	Length
1.	"Don't Cry Tonight"	Savage	4:55
2.	"Take a Chance"	Mr. Flagio	6:05
3.	"Dirty Talk"	Klein + M.B.O.	6:45
4.	"Passion"	The Flirts	8:24
5.	"Ti sento"	Matia Bazar	5:29
6.	"Never Be Alone"	Justice vs. Simian	4:03
7.	"The Show Must Go On"	Queen	4:07
8.	"Stand on the Word"	Celestial Choir	4:32
9.	"I Was Born This Way"	Carl Bean	4:43
10.	"I'd Rather Leave While I'm in Love"	Dusty Springfield	2:45

Disc two (Neil Tennant)
No.	Title	Writer(s)	Original artist(s)	Length
1.	"Traum"		Fairmont	4:50
2.	"Pulse Pause Repeat"		Harold Budd, Ruben Garcia and Daniel Lentz	3:51
3.	"Microgravity"		Biosphere	4:47
4.	"Come In!: II."	Vladimir Martynov	Ensemble Opus Posth	4:24
5.	"Promenade Sentimentale (Sentimental Walk)"		Vladimir Cosma	2:33
6.	"La Baie"		Étienne Daho	5:20
7.	"Tiny"		Vessel	3:39
8.	"Laura's Theme"		Craig Armstrong	2:31
9.	"One Two Three No Gravity (Dettinger mix)"		Closer Musik	5:04
10.	"Goin' Back"		Dusty Springfield	3:31
11.	"Lunz"		Lunz	4:00
12.	"Sospiri Op. 70"	Edward Elgar	Sir John Barbirolli Conducts The New Philharmonic Orchestra	5:04
13.	"DD Rhodes"		www.jz-arkh.co.uk	4:53
14.	"Video Kid"		The Video Kid	4:05
15.	"Movement"		Lobe	3:19
16.	"At Dusk"		John Surman	2:07
17.	"Melodie Op. 47 No. 3"	Edvard Grieg	Emil Gilels	3:54
