= Adam Freeland =

English record producer and DJ (born 1973)

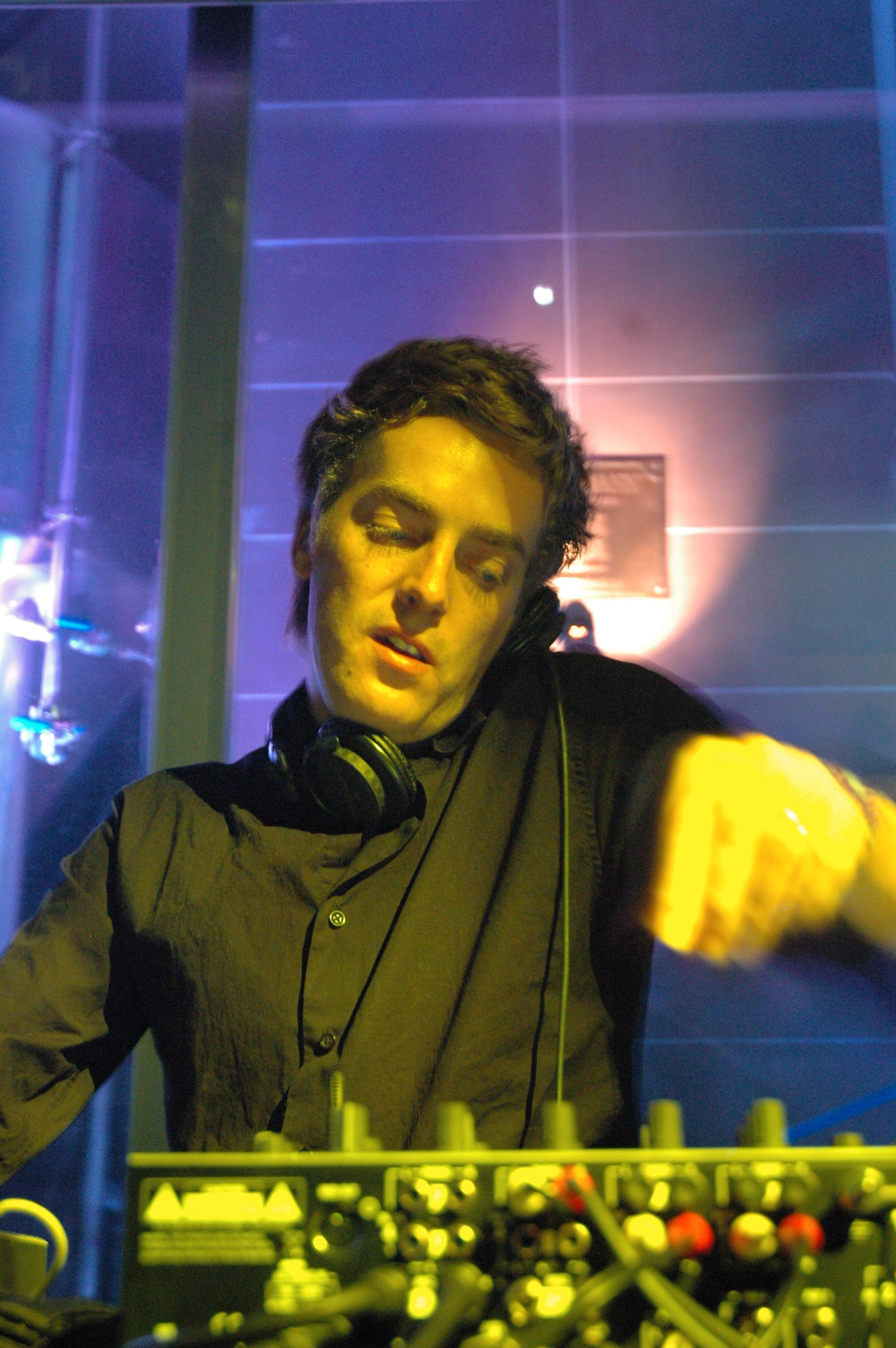

Background information
- Born: 7 August 1973 (age 53); Welwyn Garden City, Hertfordshire, England
- Genres: Electronic; breakbeat; house; electro; dub
- Occupations: DJ; record producer
- Years active: 1991–present
- Label: Marine Parade

Adam Freeland (born 7 August 1973) is an English record producer and DJ. He is also the owner and creative director of the record label Marine Parade, which has released material by artists including Evil Nine, ILS, Alex Metric and Jape. Born in Welwyn Garden City, Hertfordshire, England, he first began DJing in 1991, originally mixing deep house and later drum and bass. After becoming an in-demand DJ around Britain, he released his first mix album Coastal Breaks (1996) and formed the electronic music duo Tsunami One with Kevin Beber. From 1999 to 2001, Freeland hosted a show on Friday night on London's Kiss 100 FM. In 2000, he released his debut studio album, Now & Them.

Freeland is also one third of the Acid. The band consists of Californian producer, composer, professor of music technology Steve Nalepa and the Australian, Los Angeles based artist, RY X. On 14 April 2013, the band released their debut self-titled EP, along with a video for the track "Basic Instinct". On 7 July 2014, the band released their debut album entitled Liminal on Infectious Music (UK) and Mute (US).

== Career ==
He was originally a resident of Brighton, but moved to Los Angeles where he recorded his second studio album Cope™. However, he has since returned to Brighton. In 1996, Freeland released the first Coastal Breaks album, both of which are one track over an hour long each. Since then he has released the Tectonics, On Tour and Global Underground mix albums, as well as a FabricLive mix, and Back To Mine. Freeland's debut artist album Now and Them, released in 2003, relied on influences from punk, hip hop, electro, dub, reggae and rock. It featured the UK Top 40 hit "We Want Your Soul"; with his remix of Sarah Vaughan's "Fever" nominated for a Grammy Award in 2006; and his personally requested mix of The Doors "Hello, I Love You" receiving critical acclaim. Several artists have collaborated with Freeland: Cope™ featured Tommy Lee of Mötley Crüe playing drums, Twiggy Ramirez in the bass, Joey Santiago from The Pixies and Tony Bevilacqua of The Distillers / Spinnerette played guitar, with Alex Metric in production. Plus there are collaborations with Soundpool, Vocals from Brody Dalle (The Distillers / Spinnerette) and Gerald V. Casale from DEVO. Freeland's new frontman Kurt Baumann also sings on four songs.

In 2008, Freeland contributed the song "KIN" to the Survival International charity album, Songs for Survival.

At the beginning of 2010, Cope™ Remixed was released on Freeland's own Marine Parade label, featuring all songs from the original Cope™ album but this time remixed by over twenty different producers, resulting in a double album covering a range of different electronic genres and sounds. Some of the producers involved include High Rankin, Evil Nine, Gui Boratto, TC, AC Slater, Joker, Siriusmo and Marc Romboy. In July 2010, Adam released the single 'How To Fake Your Own Life' which included remixes by Etienne de Crecy and Om Unit.

=== In popular culture ===
"Fear" was featured in the 2002/2008/2016 Dreamcast, PlayStation 2, Xbox 360 and PlayStation 4 title, Rez (known on the Xbox 360 as Rez HD and on the PlayStation 4 as Rez Infinite). The song was featured during the fifth and final stage of the game, known as "Area 05". A remixed version of the song was featured on the soundtrack released called Rez Gamer's Guide To..., which lacked the California Soul sample. "Fear" later evolved into "Mind Killer", the Jagz Kooner remix of which appeared on the soundtrack for Need for Speed: Underground 2. The song's refrain, "Fear is the mind killer," is part of the Bene Gesserit meditation from the novel Dune.

His remix of the Australian electronic group Infusion song "Better World" was featured in Burnout Revenge.

Freeland also created many custom tracks exclusively for the video game Juiced 2: Hot Import Nights.

On the video game The Sims 2: Nightlife, three songs ("Busy", "Arch of the Sims" and "Makeover") are credited to Freeland.

In Grand Theft Auto IV: The Lost and Damned and Episodes from Liberty City, his song "Borderline" was featured on the Radio Broker station. "Borderline" was also featured on Forza Motorsport 3.

In the animated anthology film The Animatrix, the song "Big Wednesday" is credited to Freeland (as "Free*Land"). It can be heard in The Second Renaissance: Part 1.

Freeland's extended remix of Sarah Vaughan's "Fever" is used in the 2011 George Nolfi movie The Adjustment Bureau.

The Adam Freeland remix of 'it's under control' featured on an episode of the MMA fighter Alistair Overeem's online documentary, which can be found at www.thereem.com. The episode is number 7 of the first series, beginning at 9:32.

"Best Fish Tacos in Ensenada" was featured in PS3's LittleBigPlanet Karting developed by United Front Games. It also appeared in MotoGP 09/10 alongside Alex Metric's remix of "Under Control" were featured, one as introduction track and the other as background music.

The Adult Swim series Off the Air featured "We Want Your Soul" in one episode, as well as an abridged version of its music video.

== Discography ==
=== Albums ===
- 2003 Now and Them (as Freeland)
- 2007 The Hate EP (as Adam Freeland)
- 2009 Cope™ (as Freeland)
- 2010 Cope™ Remixed (as Freeland)
- 2014 Liminal (as The Acid)

=== Compilations ===
- 1996 Coastal Breaks – Vol 1
- 1998 Coastal Breaks – Vol 2
- 2000 Tectonics
- 2001 on Tour
- 2004 FabricLive.16
- 2005 Back to Mine
- 2007 Global Underground 032: Mexico City
- 2008 Two Hours to Jupiter

=== Singles ===
- Tsunami One – "Number 43 With Steamed Rice Please"
- Tsunami One & BT – "Hip Hop Phenomenon"
- Freeland & Beber Street Technique – "Down"
- Freeland – "We Want Your Soul" (2003) – UK No. 35
- Freeland – "Supernatural Thing" (2004) – UK No. 65
- Freeland, Wink & Middleton – "Rise Above"
- Freeland – "Heel n Toe"
- Freeland – "Mind Killer"
- Adam Freeland – "Silverlake Pills"
- Adam Freeland – Hate (EP)
- Freeland – "Under Control"
- Adam Freeland – "How To Fake Your Own Life" (2010)

=== Remixes ===
- The Orb – "Little Fluffy Clouds"
- Daft Punk – "TRON Legacy Theme"
- Aquasky – "Bodyshock"
- Tales From the Hardside – "Chemical Breakdown"
- Orbital – "Nothing Left"
- Planet Funk – "Chase the Sun"
- Infusion – "Better World"
- Ils – "Cherish"
- Kayode Olajide – "Olufela"
- Kelis – "Trick Me"
- Ken Woodman and his Picadilly Brass - "Mexican Flyer"
- Killa Kela – "Secrets"
- Kim – "Wet N Wild"
- K-Swing + Beber – "This Is the Sound"
- Nirvana – "Smells Like Freeland"
- The White Stripes – "Seven Nation Freeland"
- Pressure Drop – "Warrior Sound"
- Pressure Drop – "Your Mine"
- Pink – "Trouble"
- Protocol – "She Waits for Me"
- Sarah Vaughan – "Fever"
- B-Movie – "Nowhere Girl"
- Telemen – "In All Nothing"
- The Doors – "Hello I Love You"
- Shiny Toy Guns – "You Are The One"
- Fujiya & Miyagi – "Ankle Injuries"
- Fluke – "Absurd"
- Marilyn Manson – "You And Me and the Devil Makes 3"
- Silversun Pickups – "Lazy Eye"
- Spinnerette – "Sex Bomb"
- Metric – "Sick Muse"
- Metric – "Gimme Sympathy"
- The Temper Trap – "Fader"
- Om Unit – "Searching"
- Lana Del Rey – "Summertime Sadness"
- Grinderman – "No Pussy Blues"
- Klangkarussell – "Netzwerk (Falls Like Rain)"
- Rodrigo y Gabriela & Hans Zimmer – "Palm Tree Escape"
