= The Future of the Gravity Boy =

Studio album by Infadels
- Released: 19 March 2012
- Genre: Rock; Electronica
- Label: Sony Music Entertainment
- Producer: Alex Metric & Matt Gooderson

Infadels chronology
Universe in Reverse (2008)	The Future of the Gravity Boy (2012)

The Future of the Gravity Boy is the third album by London-based rock band Infadels. It was released digitally on 19 March 2012 and physically on 9 June 2012. The album was produced by DJ and electro artist Alex Metric and Matt Gooderson.

== Track listing ==
1. "From Out of the Black Sky"
2. "The Future of the Gravity Boy"
3. "Ghosts"
4. "We Get Along"
5. "Violent Oblivion"
6. "Encounters of the First Kind"
7. "Mercury Rising"
8. "Jupiter 5"
9. "Explain Nothing"
10. "5:03"
