= Bohemia – Remixes & Exclusives =

Bohemia - Remixes & Exclusives

Remix album by Ils
- Released: July 2007
- Genre: Electronica
- Label: Distinct'ive Records

Ils chronology
Bohemia (2005)	Bohemia - Remixes & Exclusives (2007)	Paranoid Prophets (2007)

Bohemia – Remixes & Exclusives is a remix album consisting of the original tracks from the previous Ils release Bohemia, with remixes and exclusives, as the title suggests. It was released by Distinct'ive Records in July 2007.

== Track listing ==
1. "Intro" Reprise 2:09
2. "Tiny Toy" 5:41
3. "Angels" 5:25
4. "Cherish" 4:43
5. "Feed the Addiction" 4:38
6. "Ill-Logic" 5:51
7. "Storm from the East" 5:59
8. "Precious" 3:32
9. "Razorblade" 4:16
10. "The World Is Yours" 3:42
11. "Loving You" 4:13
12. "West Coast" 5:16
13. "Over My Head" 4:57
14. "Cherish" Adam Freeland Mix 6:58
15. "Cherish" Vicious Circle Mix 5:49
16. "Cherish" Instrumental Mix 5:27
17. "Loving You" Atomic Hooligan Mix 6:09
18. "Storm From The East" ILS 12" Club Mix 5:52
19. "Loving You" Drum Monkeys Remix 6:37
20. "Razorblade" Stranger Remix 6:51
21. "Angels" ILS 12" Version 5:27
22. "Angels" Santos Another Planet Mix 8:31
23. "Angels" Santos Come With Mix 8:05
24. "Angels" ED 209 Mix 7:10
25. "Angels" Teddy Tinkleman Mix 6:24
26. "Baba O' Reilly" ILS Club Mix 6:04
27. "Saxtrax" ILS Club Mix 6:01
28. "Feed The Addiction" Deekline Mix 6:14
29. "Feed The Addiction" Future Funk Squad Mix 7:56
30. "Feed The Addiction" ILS Progressive Mix 5:48
31. "Storm From The East" ILS Progressive Mix 5:34
32. "World Is Yours" ILS Progressive Mix 5:47
33. "Tiny Toy" ILS Progressive Mix 5:51
34. "Storm From The East" Mystery Mix 6:39
35. "Angels" Instrumental 5:32
