= Back to Mine: Adam Freeland =

Mixtape by Adam Freeland
- Released: July 25, 2005
- Length: 1:08:55
- Label: Back to Mine
- Compiler: Adam Freeland

Adam Freeland chronology
Fabric Live 16 (2004)	Back to Mine: Adam Freeland (2005)	Global Underground 032 (2005)

Back to Mine chronology
Back to Mine: Pet Shop Boys (2005)	Back to Mine: Adam Freeland (2005)	Back to Mine: Roots Manuva (2005)

Professional ratings
Review scores
Source	Rating
Collective (BBC)	4/5 stars
NME	8/10 stars
Exclaim	(unfavorable)

Back to Mine: Adam Freeland, compiled by DJ Adam Freeland is the twenty-first compilation album in the Back to Mine series published by the Dance Music Collective.

The compilation album received coverage in NME; the review's conclusion was "Damn near perfect - 8/10."

Freeland shared his thoughts on the album compilation process:

When asked to compile this Back to Mine, I initially starting scouring my record collection for my favourite records of all time and those that have had the biggest influence on my style...This is a snapshot of some of my favourite tracks that are keeping my neighbors up right now. I have compiled the mix to start all guns blazing, as you would want to hear arriving back home steaming after a big night, then, as the evening progresses, it gradually mellows out to end up as a stoned, horizontal, blissful haze.

== Track listing ==
1. Adam Freeland – Intro
2. ...And You Will Know Us by the Trail of Dead – Will You Smile Again for Me
3. Autolux – Turnstile Blues
4. Interpol – Untitled
5. TV on the Radio – Staring at the Sun
6. Ambulance LTD – Yoga Means Union
7. The Beta Band – It's Not Too Beautiful
8. Jape – Floating
9. EL-P – Constellation Recall
10. Elliott Smith – Needle in the Hay
11. PJ Harvey – The Slow Drug
12. Funkadelic – Maggot Brain
13. Dyke House – Sandy Strip
14. M83 – Lower Your Eyes to Die With the Sun
15. Trans Am – A Single Ray of Light on an Other Wise Cloudy Day
16. Boards of Canada – Zoetrope
