= Mirrors In Your Eyes =

Mirrors in Your Eyes

Studio album by Soundpool
- Released: April 27, 2010
- Genre: Shoegaze, disco, psychedelia
- Length: 45:57
- Label: Killer Pimp

Soundpool chronology
| Dichotomies & Dreamland (2008) | Mirrors in Your Eyes (2010) | Re-Mirrored (2011) |

Professional ratings
Review scores
| Source | Rating |
|---|---|
| AllMusic | 4/5 stars |

Mirrors in Your Eyes is the third studio album by American shoegaze band Soundpool, released April 27, 2010, on Killer Pimp. The album was noted for its unusual blend of shoegaze and disco.

Music videos were produced for the title track and "Kite of Love".

== Track listing ==
| No. | Title | Length |
|---|---|---|
| 1. | "Mirrors in Your Eyes" | 4:28 |
| 2. | "But It's So" | 5:00 |
| 3. | "Kite of Love" | 5:02 |
| 4. | "Makes No Sense" | 3:32 |
| 5. | "Sparkle in the Dark" | 4:11 |
| 6. | "I'm So Tired" | 6:19 |
| 7. | "That Sunny Day" | 5:30 |
| 8. | "Shelter" | 6:41 |
| 9. | "Listen" | 5:14 |
| Total length: | | 45:57 |
