= Sonnentanz =

2012 debut single by Klangkarussell

Single by Klangkarussell

from the album Netzwerk
- Released: 23 July 2012 (original version); 15 August 2013 (vocal version)
- Recorded: 2011–13
- Genre: Nu jazz; deep house; tropical house
- Length: 6:02 (original mix); 3:40 (vocal mix)
- Label: Stil Vor Talent; Vertigo; Capitol
- Songwriters: Tobias Rieser; Adrian Held
- Producer: Klangkarussell

Klangkarussell singles chronology
"Sonnentanz" (2012)	"Sonnentanz (Sun Don't Shine)" (2013)

Klangkarussell singles chronology
"Sonnentanz" (2012)	"Sonnentanz (Sun Don't Shine)" (2013)	"Netzwerk (Falls Like Rain)" (2014)

Will Heard singles chronology
"Sonnentanz (Sun Don't Shine)" (2013)	"I Can't Keep Up" (2014)

Jaymes Young singles chronology
"Sun Don't Shine" (2015)

"Sonnentanz (Sun Don't Shine)"

"Sonnentanz" (German for 'Sun Dance') is the debut single by Austrian electronic music duo Klangkarussell. The song was written and produced by Tobias Rieser and Adrian Held. It was originally published through the duo's SoundCloud on 29 September 2011. It was officially released as a single on 23 July 2012 digitally with remixes through the label Stil Vor Talent. After the track became a viral hit and entered the charts by downloads only, it was released physically in German speaking countries on 14 September 2012 (CD) and 27 September 2012 (vinyl). The song has reached the top 10 in 6 countries (Austria, Belgium, Germany, Netherlands, Switzerland and the United Kingdom). A second version, titled "Sonnentanz (Sun Don't Shine)", features vocals from Will Heard. This version was released in the United Kingdom on 15 August 2013. Both tracks were included in their 2014 debut album Netzwerk. A third version, titled "Sun Don't Shine" and featuring vocals from American singer Jaymes Young, was released on 31 March 2015 in North America.

== Music video ==
A music video to accompany the release of "Sonnentanz (Sun Don't Shine)" was first released onto YouTube on 15 July 2013 at a total length of three minutes and fifty-one seconds. It has received over 22 million views as of March 2016.

Parts of the video were filmed at the roof of the Ibis Wien Mariahilf hotel in Vienna, overlooking the 15th district.

== Critical reception ==
Robert Copsey of Digital Spy gave the song a positive review stating:

"It's no secret that the freshest and most exciting dance tracks often take their time escaping the cliquey hub of Europe's party islands before they are set free and allowed to migrate over to the UK. The latest to wash up on our shores? Austrian duo Klangkarussell, whose track 'Sonnentanz' became a fave across the Balearics in its instrumental form last year. Naturally, it's been compacted into a more radio-friendly length and had lyrics laid over the top courtesy of 21-year-old newbie Will Heard, who also provides the impressively on-trend tortured soul vocal. Thankfully, none of this takes away from the wonderfully hypnotic production that provides a gentle comedown from summer we so sorely need."

== Sample ==
In 2013 a dutch DJ discovered that the song uses a lot of samples from the sample CD “NU JAZZ CITY” by Bigfisaudio. He writes about his discovery in this article: https://3voor12.vpro.nl/artikelen/overzicht/2013/song-van-het-jaar/Song-van-het-Jaar--Sonnentanz-Klangkarussell.html

== Track listing ==
Digital download
No.	Title	Length
1.	"Sonnentanz"	6:02
2.	"Sonnentanz" (Oliver Koletzki Remix)	6:42
3.	"Sonnentanz" (Phonique's Sonnentrance Remix)	8:16
4.	"Sonnentanz" (Kellerkind Remix)	6:42

Beatport–exclusive remix single
No.	Title	Length
1.	"Sonnentanz" (Sascha Braemer Remix)	6:02

UK digital download – single
No.	Title	Length
1.	"Sonnentanz (Sun Don't Shine)" (featuring Will Heard)	3:41

UK digital download – EP
No.	Title	Length
1.	"Sonnentanz"	6:03
2.	"Sonnentanz (Sun Don't Shine)" (Jakwob Remix)	6:01
3.	"Sonnentanz (Sun Don't Shine)" (Rob da Bank Remix)	4:24
4.	"Sonnentanz (Sun Don't Shine)" (My Nu Leng Remix)	4:57

North American digital download
No.	Title	Length
1.	"Sun Don't Shine" (featuring Jaymes Young)	3:57

== Charts ==
=== Weekly charts ===
Chart (2012–13)	Peak position
Austria (Ö3 Austria Top 40)	3
Belgium (Ultratop 50 Flanders)	3
Belgium (Ultratop 50 Wallonia)	7
Czech Republic Airplay (ČNS IFPI)	97
Denmark (Tracklisten)	31
Germany (GfK)	4
France (SNEP)	22
Ireland (IRMA)	18
Netherlands (Dutch Top 40)	1
Netherlands (Single Top 100)	1
Poland Dance (ZPAV)	24
Scotland Singles (Official Charts)	4
Switzerland (Schweizer Hitparade)	3
UK Dance (Official Charts)	2
UK Singles (Official Charts)	3
US Dance Club Songs (Billboard)	18

=== Year-end charts ===
Chart (2012)	Position
Austria (Ö3 Austria Top 40)	33
Germany (Media Control AG)	26
Switzerland (Schweizer Hitparade)	27

Chart (2013)	Position
Austria (Ö3 Austria Top 40)	25
Belgium (Ultratop Flanders)	19
Belgium (Ultratop Wallonia)	46
France (SNEP)	125
Germany (Media Control AG)	22
Netherlands (Dutch Top 40)	14
Netherlands (Single Top 100)	27
Switzerland (Schweizer Hitparade)	10
UK Singles (Official Charts Company)	52

Chart (2014)	Position
France (SNEP)	165

== Certifications ==
Region	Certification	Certified units/sales
Austria (IFPI Austria)	Platinum	30,000^{*}
Belgium (BRMA)	Gold	15,000^{*}
Germany (BVMI)	5× Gold	750,000^{‡}
Italy (FIMI)	Gold	15,000^{‡}
New Zealand (RMNZ)	Gold	7,500^{*}
Switzerland (IFPI Switzerland)	3× Platinum	90,000^{^}
United Kingdom (BPI)	2× Platinum	1,200,000^{‡}
^{*} Sales figures based on certification alone.^{^} Shipments figures based on certification alone.^{‡} Sales+streaming figures based on certification alone.

== Release history ==
Region	Date	Format	Label
Worldwide	23 July 2012	Digital download	Stil Vor Talent
Germany	30 August 2013	Digital download	Vertigo; Capitol
United Kingdom	15 August 2013	Digital download	Island
United States	22 October 2013	Digital download	Casablanca; Republic
United States	31 March 2015	Digital download	Astralwerks
