= Universe in Reverse =

Studio album by Infadels
- Released: 23 June 2008
- Genre: Rock; Electronica
- Label: Wall Of Sound

Infadels chronology
We Are Not The Infadels (2006)	Universe in Reverse (2008)	The Future of the Gravity Boy (2012)

Universe In Reverse is the second album by London-based rock band Infadels. It was released on 23 June 2008.

The first single "Make Mistakes" was released on 21 April 2008 and the second single "Free Things" was released on 16 June 2008. "A Million Pieces", the third single, was released on 1 September 2008.

== Track listing ==
1. "Circus of the Mad"
2. "Make Mistakes"
3. "Play Blind"
4. "Free Things for Poor People"
5. "Code 1"
6. "A Million Pieces"
7. "Universe in Reverse"
8. "Don't Look Behind You"
9. "Chemical Girlfriend"
10. "How to Disappear"
