= You Can Be Special Too =

Studio album by Evil Nine
- Released: 2 August 2004
- Genre: Big beat; electronic; breakbeat; trip hop
- Length: 52:49
- Label: Marine Parade
- Producer: Tom Beaufoy, Pat Pardy

Evil Nine chronology
You Can Be Special Too (2004)	They Live (2008)

Singles from You Can Be Special Too
- 1. "Restless" Released: 21 June 2004; 2. "Crooked" Released: 4 October 2004; 3. "Pearl Shot" Released: 4 July 2005

Professional ratings
Review scores
Source	Rating
About.com	5/5 stars
Allmusic	3.5/5 stars
The Independent	3/5 stars
PopMatters	(7/10)

You Can Be Special Too is the debut album of English electronic music duo Evil Nine. It was released on 2 August 2004 on Marine Parade Records. The album includes four skits containing a variety of samples.

Tracks 12 and 13 are mislabeled on the album. The song "Restless" actually plays on track 13 and "Even the Smells" plays on track 12. It is unknown what order the tracks were meant to appear on the album. The correct times are listed below according to the track name - but not the number.

== Track listing ==
1. "Crooked" (featuring Aesop Rock) – 5:47
2. "Devil Stuff" – 4:52
3. "Earth" – 4:38
4. "You Can Be Special (Skit)" – 0:34
5. "We Have the Energy" – 5:21
6. "Snack Bar Lounge" – 2:55
7. "Help (Skit)" – 0:22
8. "Pearl Shot" (featuring Juice Aleem) – 5:19
9. "You Are Not Through" – 4:48
10. "Richard & Jane (Skit)" – 0:30
11. "For Lovers Not Fighters" – 4:12
12. "Even the Smells" – 2:03
13. "Restless" (featuring Toastie Taylor) – 4:54
14. "You Can Be Special 2 (Skit)" – 0:31
15. "Hired Goons" – 5:44

== Samples ==
- The dialogue at the start of track 4 is from the book Do Androids Dream of Electric Sheep?.

== Personnel ==
=== Evil Nine ===
- Tom Beaufoy - production, keyboards, turntables, programming, samples
- Patrick Pardy - production, bass, guitar, engineering, keyboards

=== Additional musicians ===
- Chris Kavanagh (Big Audio Dynamite) - drums
- Jean-Marc Preisler "JFB" - turntables on "Snack Bar Lounge"
- Blackitude - raps on "Earth"
- Tomo - raps on "Earth"
- Aesop Rock - raps on "Crooked"
- Juice Aleem - raps on "Pearl Shot"
- Mary Shodipo - vocals on "You Are Not Through"
- Garvin Edwards (Toastie Taylor) - raps on "Restless"
- Daniel Harrison - lead and backing vocals on "Restless"
