= Netzwerk (album) =

Studio album by Klangkarussell
- Released: 25 July 2014
- Recorded: 2011–2014
- Genre: Deep house; tropical house
- Label: Vertigo; Capitol; Universal
- Producer: Tobias Rieser; Adrian Held

Singles from Netzwerk
- 1. "Sonnentanz" Released: 23 July 2012; 2. "Sonnentanz (Sun Don't Shine)" Released: 15 August 2013; 3. "Netzwerk (Falls Like Rain)" Released: 9 May 2014

Professional ratings
Review scores
| Source | Rating |
|---|---|
| Bass Feeds The Soul | (favorable) |
| Clash | 5/10 |
| The Guardian | 3/5 stars |
| Laut | 4/6 stars |
| Hot Press | (unfavorable) |
| T-Online | (favorable) |

Netzwerk is the first studio album by the electronic band Klangkarussell. It was released in 2014 through Vertigo Records.

== Track listing ==
European track listing
| No. | Title | Length |
|---|---|---|
| 1. | "Eistee aus der Dose" | 5:38 |
| 2. | "Netzwerk (Falls Like Rain)" (vocals by Tom Cane) | 3:50 |
| 3. | "Berlin" (vocals by Felix Howard) | 6:22 |
| 4. | "We Want Your Soul" (featuring Adam Freeland) | 8:24 |
| 5. | "Sonnentanz" | 6:00 |
| 6. | "Symmetry" (vocals by Tom Cane) | 5:02 |
| 7. | "Celebrate" | 6:24 |
| 8. | "Sternenkinder" | 7:32 |
| 9. | "Moments" (featuring Will Heard) | 5:02 |
| 10. | "All Eyes On You" (vocals by Patsy McKay) | 8:19 |
| 11. | "Sonnentanz (Sun Don't Shine)" (featuring Will Heard) (bonus track) | 3:57 |

Deluxe edition bonus tracks
| No. | Title | Length |
|---|---|---|
| 12. | "Netzwerk" | 6:06 |
| 13. | "Netzwerk (Falls Like Rain)" (Camo & Krooked Remix) | 4:19 |
| 14. | "Netzwerk (Falls Like Rain)" (Ten Ven Remix) | 6:17 |
| 15. | "Netzwerk (Falls Like Rain)" (Adam Freeland Remix) | 7:07 |
| 16. | "Netzwerk (Falls Like Rain)" (video) | 4:00 |

Notes

- The UK track listing changes the places of tracks 5 and 11
- Tracks 1 and 8 translate to "Ice Tea in a Can" and "Star Children"

Sample credits

- "Netzwerk (Falls Like Rain)" and "Netzwerk" samples elements from "Madan" by Salif Keita
- "Celebrate" interpolates elements from the composition "I Just Want to Celebrate" by Rare Earth
- "Sternenkinder" incorporates elements of "Makings of a Cyborg" as composed by Kenji Kawai from the Ghost in the Shell original soundtrack
- Track 4 is a remix of the 2003 song "We Want Your Soul" by Adam Freeland; originally released as We Want Your Soul (Klangkarussell Remix)

== Charts ==
=== Weekly charts ===
| Chart (2014) | Peak; position |
|---|---|
| Austrian Albums (Ö3 Austria) | 5 |
| Belgian Albums (Ultratop Flanders) | 11 |
| Belgian Albums (Ultratop Wallonia) | 24 |
| Dutch Albums (Album Top 100) | 43 |
| German Albums (Offizielle Top 100) | 8 |
| Swiss Albums (Schweizer Hitparade) | 2 |
| UK Albums (OCC) | 71 |
| UK Dance Albums (OCC) | 6 |

=== Year-end charts ===
| Chart (2014) | Position |
|---|---|
| Belgian Albums (Ultratop Flanders) | 179 |

== Certifications ==
Certifications for Netzwerk
| Region | Certification | Certified units/sales |
|---|---|---|
| New Zealand (RMNZ) | Gold | 7,500^{‡} |
^{‡} Sales+streaming figures based on certification alone.

== Release history ==
| Region | Date | Format | Label |
|---|---|---|---|
| Europe | 25 July 2014 | CD; digital download; vinyl | Vertigo; Capitol; Universal |
| United Kingdom | 1 September 2014 | Digital download | Vertigo; Capitol; Universal |
