= Network (typeface) =

Neo-grotesque sans-serif typeface

- Category: Sans-serif
- Classification: Neo-grotesque
- Designer(s): Dan Rhatigan
- Commissioned by: Transport for West Midlands
- Date created: 2012

Network is a sans-serif typeface originally created by Monotype for use on the transport network in the Birmingham/West Midlands metropolitan area in the United Kingdom. The typeface is based on VAG Rounded, which was previously the typeface used by the West Midlands Passenger Transport Executive for public information in the county.

Network was in use for transport branding and signage until 2018, when it was phased out by Transport for West Midlands who introduced new shared branding across different transport modes, including the West Midlands Metro, using LL Circular by Lineto as the primary typeface.

== See also ==
- Public signage typefaces
- Johnston (typeface) - the iconic typeface in use by Transport for London, in a similar fashion to Network
