= Möwe (DJ duo) =

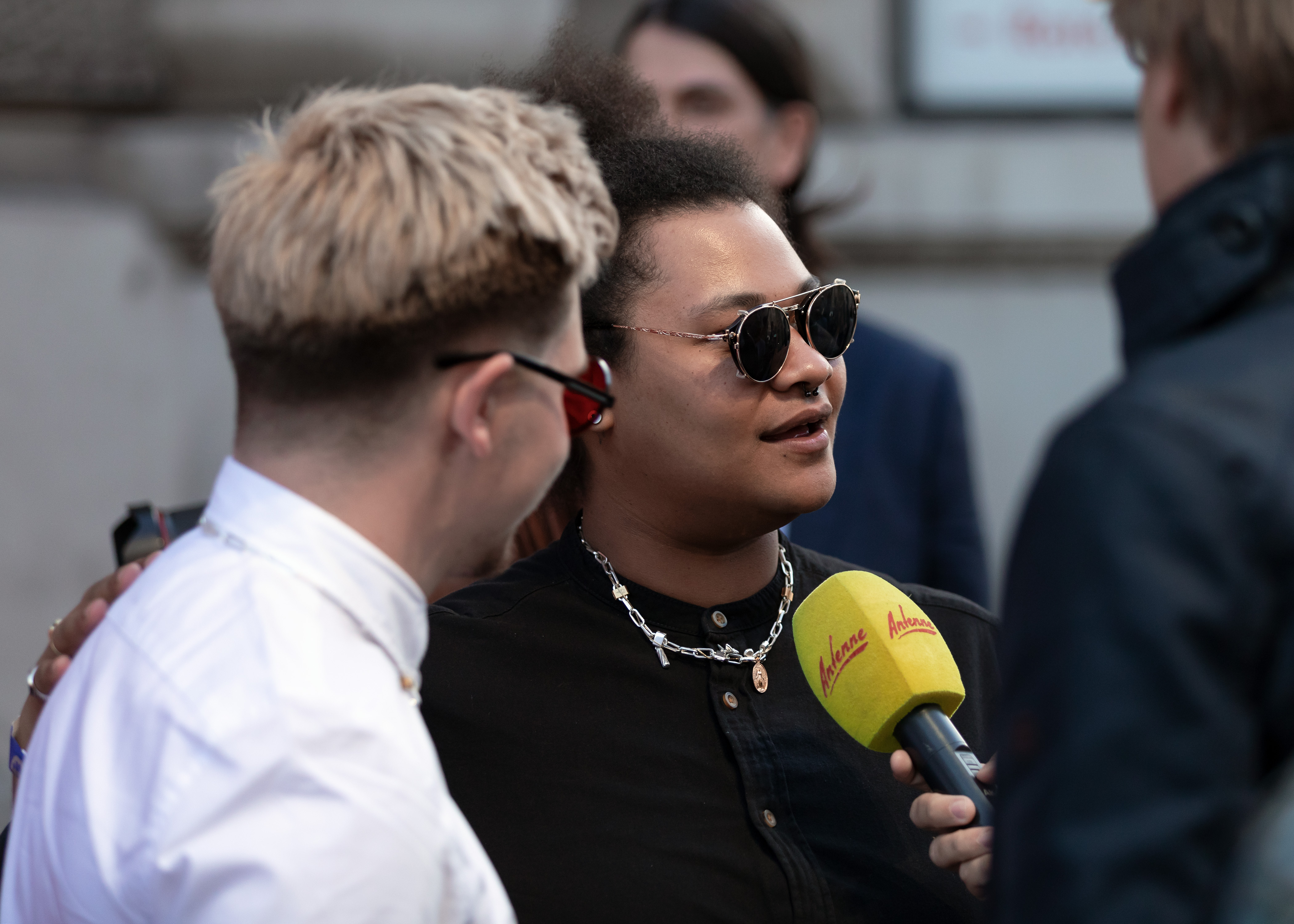

Background information
- Origin: Vienna
- Genres: Dream pop
- Years active: 2013-present
- Labels: Spinnin' Records

Möwe is an Austrian DJ-duo from Vienna consisting of Melanie Ebietoma and Clemens Martinuzzi. Möwe means seagull in German.

== History ==
Ebietoma played in an indie rock band and met Martinuzzi in the search for a new bassist. After the band broke up in August 2012, the two began producing their own music as "Dreamdie". Möwe was formed on 10 January 2013. In 2013, the duo released the single Blauer Tag (Blue Day), which earned them attention and led to booking requests in Germany. In 2014, Möwe was signed to the music label Stil vor Talent.

In November 2016, the duo released its first album on the Armada Music record label, titled Back In The Summer. Its single Skyline reached number 66 on the Austrian music charts. In March 2018, the band together with Sam Feldt and Karra published the single Down For Anything on the label Spinnin' Records.

== Discography ==
- 2013: Blauer Tag
- 2014: Seven Days
- 2014: Inside
- 2015: Chasing Clouds
- 2015: Lovers Friends (with Daniel Nitt)
- 2016: Your Skin (feat. Bright Sparks)
- 2017: The Walk
- 2017: One Love
- 2017: Skyline
- 2018: Who’s to Blame
- 2018: Down for Anything (with Sam Feldt feat. Karra)
- 2018: Insane (feat. Sibbyl)
- 2018: Down by the River (feat. Emy Perez)
- 2019: if i ain’t got you (feat. RØRY)
- 2020: Talk To Me (Sam Feldt Edit)
