= Ils (musician) =

- Born: Illian Walker; 1977 or 1978 (age 48–49); London, England
- Genre: Electronic
- Occupations: Record producer; DJ
- Years active: 1997–2013
- Labels: Marine Parade; Distinct'ive; Good Looking; Fuel; Botchit & Scarper

Illian Walker, better known as Ils or iLS, is an English musician and producer, who has released records on labels including Marine Parade and Distinct'ive Records.

Born in London, Ils started his production career on LTJ Bukem's drum and bass label, Good Looking Records. He was signed to Marine Parade by owner Adam Freeland, who cited Ils' unique breaks production. Ils is influenced by electro, funk, and techno artists in his Idiots Behind the Wheel album. His Soul Trader album represented a more even sound, with few particularly energetic or downbeat tracks. He also mixed an album for Distinct'ive Records' Y4k series.

His 2002 single, "Next Level", on Marine Parade spent one week at #75 in the UK Singles Chart, in February 2002. It was released on his second studio album, Soul Trader, as "6 Space (Next Level)".

== Discography ==
=== Albums ===
==== Studio albums ====
| Title | Album details |
|---|---|
| Idiots Behind the Wheel | Released: 9 August 1999; Label: Fuel Records; Formats: CD, vinyl |
| Soul Trader | Released: 7 January 2002; Label: Marine Parade Records; Formats: CD, digital download, vinyl, DVD |
| Bohemia | Released: 9 May 2005; Label: Distinct'ive Records; Formats: CD, digital download, vinyl |
| Paranoid Prophets | Released: 5 November 2007; Label: Botchit & Scarper; Formats: CD, digital download |
| 33 R.P.M. | Released: 19 February 2013; Label: Distinct'ive Records; Formats: CD, digital download |

==== Compilation albums ====
| Title | Album details |
|---|---|
| ILS Presents: Y4K | Released: 18 July 2003; Label: Distinct'ive Records; Formats: CD, vinyl |
| Bohemia – Remixes & Exclusives | Released: July 2007; Label: Distinct'ive Records; Formats: CD, digital download |

=== Singles ===
| Title | Year | Peak chart positions | Album |
| Title | Year | UK | Album |
|---|---|---|---|
| "About That Time" | 1998 | — | Idiots Behind the Wheel |
| "Next Level" | 2002 | 75 | Soul Trader |
| "No Soul" | 2002 | 82 | Soul Trader |
| "Music" | 2002 | 98 | Soul Trader |
| "Cherish" (featuring Valkyrie) | 2005 | — | Bohemia |
| "Angels" | 2005 | — | Bohemia |
| "Loving You" | 2006 | — | Bohemia |
| "Everybody Needs A Shrink" / "Burn Again" | 2007 | — | Paranoid Prophets |
| "Hate Is An Illness" | 2007 | — | Paranoid Prophets |
| "Still Crazy" (featuring Jewels Lindt) | 2013 | — | 33 R.P.M. |
| "Dark Skies" | 2013 | — | 33 R.P.M. |
"—" denotes a recording that did not chart or was not released in that territory.
