= List of university networks =

This is a list of university networks, showing formalized cooperations among institutions of tertiary education.

== Global Networks ==
- Matariki Network of Universities
- McDonnell International Scholars Academy
- Universitas 21
- Worldwide Universities Network

== Regional Networks ==
- Association of Pacific Rim Universities
- Aurora (university network)
- ASEAN University Network
- Balkan Universities Network
- Black Sea Universities Network
- Compostela Group of Universities
- Euroleague for Life Sciences
- EUROSCI Network
- Mediterranean Universities Union
- University Network of the European Capitals of Culture
- Utrecht Network
- Vives University Network
- Young European Research University Network
