= They Live (Evil Nine album) =

They Live!

Studio album by Evil Nine
- Released: 20 October 2008
- Recorded: 2007
- Genre: Big beat; electronic; breakbeat; electronic rock
- Label: Marine Parade
- Producer: Tom Beaufoy, Pat Pardy

Evil Nine chronology
You Can Be Special Too (2004)	They Live! (2008)

Singles from They Live
- 1. "They Live" Released: 4 August 2008; 2. "All the Cash" Released: 1 December 2008; 3. "Twist the Knife" Released: 2009

They Live is the second studio album from English electronic music duo Evil Nine. It was released on 20 October 2008 by Marine Parade. The album consisted of thirteen tracks and included contributions from autoKratz, El-P, Garvin Edwards (credited as Toastie Taylor) and John Ashton of The Last Shadow Puppets. Three singles were released from the album; the title track, "They Live", plus "Twist The Knife" and "All The Cash".

== Track listing ==
1. "Feed on You" – 4:17
2. "The Wait" (featuring autoKratz) – 3:56
3. "All the Cash" (featuring El-P) – 4:53
4. "They Live!" – 4:37
5. "Ngempa Guzon" – 1:14
6. "How Do We Stop the Normals?" – 4:26
7. "Dead Man Coming" (featuring Toastie Taylor) – 4:14
8. "Set It Off" (featuring Beans) – 3:50
9. "Benemoth" – 3:42
10. "Born Again" – 1:15
11. "Twist the Knife" (featuring Emily Breeze) – 3:29
12. "Luke Goss" – 4:39
13. "Icicles" (featuring Seraphim) – 4:52

== Personnel ==
=== Evil Nine ===
- Tom Beaufoy – production, mixing. keyboards, turntables, programming, samples,
- Pat Pardy – production, engineering, bass, guitar, keyboards. vocoded vocals on "They Live" and "Luke Goss"

=== Additional musicians ===
- James Ford - drums, additional programming
- autoKratz – vocals on "The Wait"
- Jaime Meline – raps on "All the Cash"
- Garvin Edwards (Toastie Taylor) – raps and vocals on "Dead Man Coming"
- Robert Stewart (Beans) – raps on "Set It Off"
- Emily Breeze – vocals on "Twist the Knife"
- John Ashton (The Last Shadow Puppets) - guitar on "Twist the Knife"
- Seraphim – vocals on "Icicles"
