= Netzwerk (Falls Like Rain) =

Single by Klangkarussell

from the album Netzwerk
- Released: 9 May 2014
- Recorded: 2012–14
- Genre: Deep house; tropical house
- Length: 3:52
- Label: Vertigo; Capitol; Universal
- Songwriters: Tobias Rieser; Adrian Held; Salif Keita; Tom Havelock
- Producers: Tobias Rieser; Adrian Held; Jochen Schmalbach

Klangkarussell singles chronology
| "Sonnentanz (Sun Don't Shine)" (2013) | "Netzwerk (Falls Like Rain)" (2014) |

"Netzwerk (Falls Like Rain)" is a song by Austrian electronic music duo Klangkarussell. It was released digitally on 9 May 2014 in Europe and on 24 August 2014 in the United Kingdom. The song initially charted at number 27 in Austria. After a month of charting, it has peaked at number 7. It has also charted in Belgium, France, Germany and Switzerland. The song was written by Tobias Rieser, Adrian Held, Salif Keita, Tom Havelock, and produced by Klangkarussell, co-produced by German musician Jochen Schmalbach. It was originally an unreleased track from 2012 simply titled "Netzwerk" (English: "Network"). It was reworked in 2014 with vocals by British singer and songwriter Tom Cane. The song also features a brief sample from the song "Madan" by Salif Keita. The song is featured as the title track and second single of their debut album, Netzwerk.

== Music video ==
A music video to accompany the release of "Netzwerk (Falls Like Rain)" was first released onto YouTube on 9 May 2014 at a total length of three minutes and fifty-nine seconds. As of April 2026 it has received more than 15 million views.

The video was directed by Charlie Robins and filmed in Belgrade, Serbia. It features Ukrainian daredevil Mustang Wanted.

== Track listing ==
Digital download
| No. | Title | Length |
|---|---|---|
| 1. | "Netzwerk (Falls Like Rain)" | 3:52 |

CD single
| No. | Title | Length |
|---|---|---|
| 1. | "Netzwerk (Falls Like Rain)" | 3:52 |
| 2. | "Netzwerk" | 6:09 |

10" vinyl

Side A

1. Netzwerk [Falls Like Rain]
2. Netzwerk

Side B

1. Netzwerk [Falls Like Rain] (Ten Ven Remix)

== Chart performance ==
=== Weekly charts ===
| Chart (2014) | Peak position |
|---|---|
| Austria (Ö3 Austria Top 40) | 7 |
| Belgium (Ultratop 50 Flanders) | 17 |
| Belgium (Ultratop 50 Wallonia) | 43 |
| France (SNEP) | 190 |
| Germany (GfK) | 17 |
| Ireland (IRMA) | 96 |
| Switzerland (Schweizer Hitparade) | 13 |
| UK Singles (Official Charts) | 83 |
| UK Dance (Official Charts) | 21 |

=== Year-end charts ===
| Chart (2014) | Rank |
|---|---|
| Austria (Ö3 Austria Top 40) | 47 |
| Belgium (Ultratop 50 Flanders) | 94 |
| Belgium Dance (Ultratop Flanders) | 24 |
| Germany (Official German Charts) | 90 |
| Switzerland (Schweizer Hitparade) | 63 |

== Release history ==
| Region | Date | Format | Label |
|---|---|---|---|
| Europe | 9 May 2014 | Digital download | Vertigo; Capitol; Universal |
| United Kingdom | 24 August 2014 | Digital download | Vertigo; Capitol; Universal |
