= Marine Parade Records =

Independent record label

Marine Parade is an independent record label set up and owned by the electronic music DJ and producer Adam Freeland in 1998.

== Details ==
The name of the label originates from the street on which Freeland used to live in his hometown of Brighton, United Kingdom.

The label released Evil Nine's You Can Be Special Too album in 2004.

The imprint's output has spanned everything from classic dance-music anthems like Freeland's We Want Your Soul and ILS' Next Level to Jape's space-folk hit Floating.

Marine Parade has released electronic albums such as Freeland's Now&Them, Evil Nine's You Can Be Special Too, and ILS' Soul Trader. Many remixes have been commissioned from other dance-music acts, like Prins Thomas, Switch and D.I.M, and featured collaborations with Aesop Rock, Josh Wink and Tom Middleton.

Marine Parade has launched new talent, having helped the career of Australian band Infusion, Richard File (as Forme), and Damian Taylor (as Stone Lions). 2008 saw the second album from Evil Nine They Live.

The second Freeland artist album Cope™ was released on the label in 2009, featuring contributions from Tommy Lee of Mötley Crüe, Alex Metric and Twiggy Ramirez amongst others. A double disc Cope™ Remixed compilation was released at the end of the year with remixes covering myriad genre, from Joker, Gui Boratto, Emalkay, Prins Thomas and Siriusmo. The label also released the debut album of PANTyRAiD (Ooah of Glitch Mob and MartyParty).

In 2010 Marine Parade released a single by Freeland titled "How To Fake Your Own Life", which included a remix by Om Unit.

== Artists ==
Artists currently on the label:

- Adam Freeland – DJ
- Alex Metric
- Evil Nine
- Ils
- K-Swing

== See also ==
- List of record labels
