= Soundpool =

US musical group

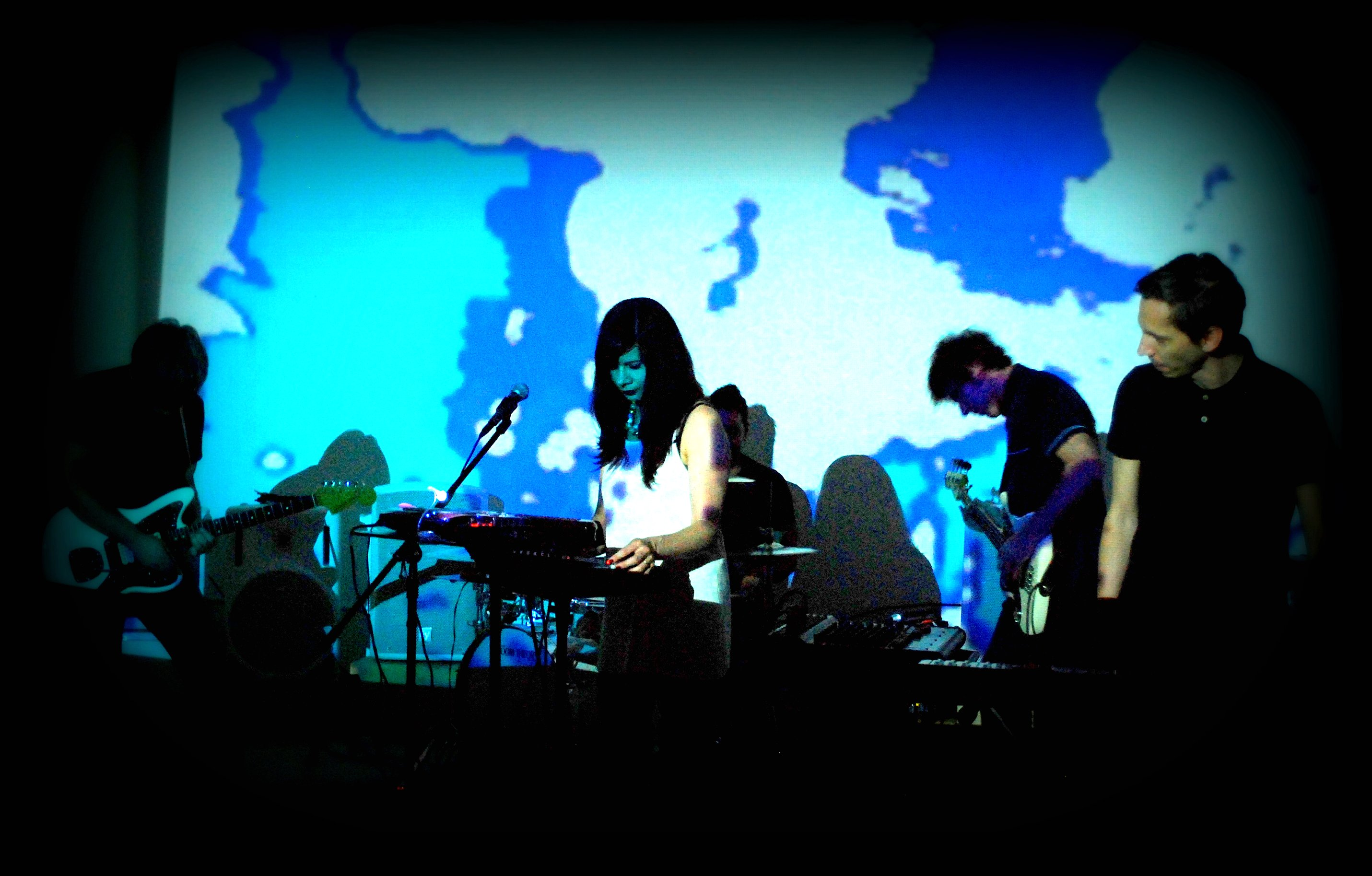
- Soundpool performing under a psychedelic film backdrop.

Background information
- Origin: New York City, New York, United States
- Genres: Shoegaze, dream pop, disco, psychedelia
- Years active: 2005–2011 (indefinite hiatus)
- Labels: Aloft, Killer Pimp
- Members: Kim Field; John Ceparano; Mark Robinson; James Renard; Sanford Santacroce
- Past members: Ben Malkin; Rich Bennett; Dean McCormick; Andy Durutti; Paolo Martin

Soundpool is an American, New York City-based shoegaze band, formed in 2005.

== History ==
Led by singer Kim Field and guitarist John Ceparano (previously with the Loveless and Jet Set Six), Soundpool formed in 2005, also featuring drummer James Renard (formerly of the Idle and the Happy Scene), keyboardist Mark Robinson and rotating bassists including Ben Malkin, Rich Bennett, Dean McCormick and Andy Durutti. Sanford Santacroce later joined as the group's permanent bassist.

Soundpool's debut studio album, On High, was released May 16, 2006 by Aloft Records, followed by Dichotomies & Dreamland in 2008.

The "But It's So" 7" single was released by Killer Pimp on January 26, 2010 in a limited edition of 500 copies.

Mirrors in Your Eyes, the band's third album, was released by Killer Pimp on April 27, 2010. It was noted for its unusual blend of shoegaze and disco.

Re-mirrored, an extended play featuring remixes by Colder, Lawrence Chandler, GTO, Strategy and Syntaks, was issued on May 24, 2011.

The band then went on indefinite hiatus.

== Other projects ==
Field and Ceparano formed the band the Stargazer Lilies, who have since released six albums: We Are the Dreamers (2013), Door to the Sun (2016), Lost (2017), Occabot (2019), Cosmic Tidal Wave (2022), and Love Pedals (2025).

== Discography ==
=== Studio albums ===
- On High (2006, Aloft Records)
- Dichotomies & Dreamland (2008, Aloft Records)
- Mirrors in Your Eyes (2010, Killer Pimp)

=== Singles and EPs ===
- "But It's So" 7" single (2010, Killer Pimp)
- Re-mirrored EP (2011, Killer Pimp)

== Members ==
Current members:

- Kim Field - vocals, Q-chord, omnichord, keyboard
- John Ceparano - guitar, bass, vocals
- Mark Robinson - keyboards
- James Renard - drums
- Sanford Santacroce - bass

Former members:

- Ben Malkin - bass
- Rich Bennett - bass
- Dean McCormick - bass
- Andy Durutti - bass
- Paolo Martin - bass
