= Klangkarussell =

Austrian electronic music duo

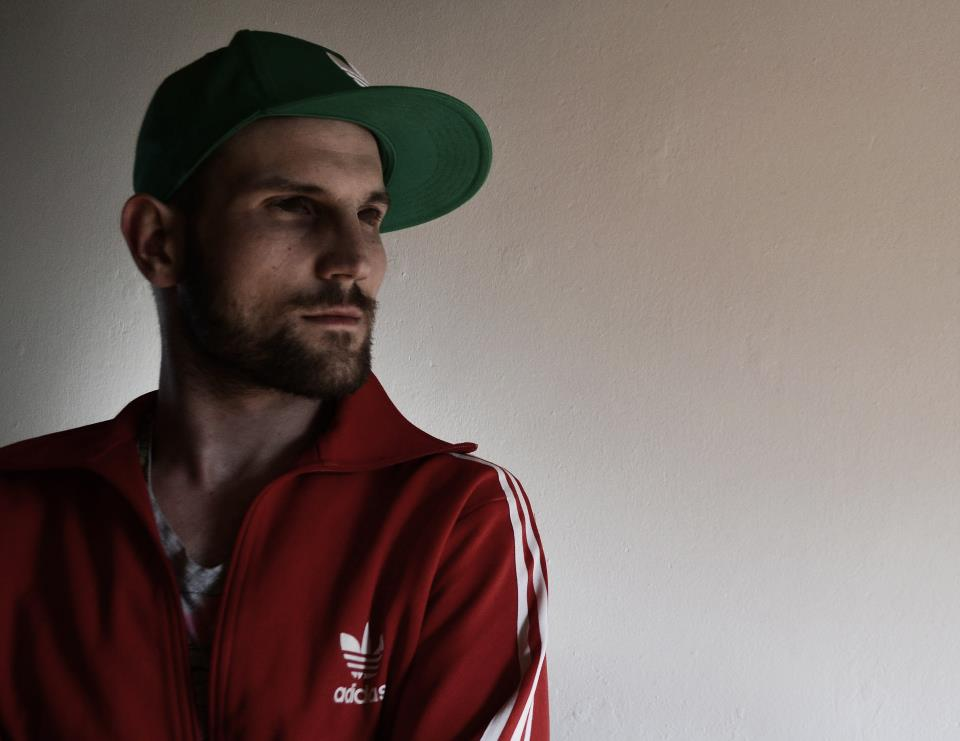
- Tobias Rieser - Member of Klangkarussell in 2012

Background information
- Origin: Salzburg, Austria
- Genres: Deep house; tropical house
- Years active: 2011–present
- Labels: Vertigo; Capitol; Universal
- Members: Tobias Rieser; Adrian Held
- Website: klangkarussell.com

Klangkarussell (German: Sound Carousel) is an Austrian electronic music duo formed in 2011. The two members of the group are Tobias Rieser and Adrian Held. Their biggest hit to date is "Sonnentanz", which reached the top 10 in six countries (Austria, Belgium, Germany, the Netherlands, the United Kingdom and Switzerland).

== Music career ==
=== 2011: Formation and early career ===
Before the duo formed, the name "Klangkarussell" referred exclusively to Rieser's solo work. At the same time, Adrian Held produced electronic music under the artist name i herald, a partial anagram of his real name. In 2011, the two artists produced their first songs together under the name "Heldenklang" (German: "Hero Sound"). Soon after, they began using Rieser's moniker Klangkarussell to refer to their ongoing collaboration.

=== 2012–present: Breakthrough and Netzwerk ===
In June 2012 the duo released their debut single "Sonnentanz". The song peaked at number 3 in Austria, number 3 in Belgium, number 170 in France, number 4 in Germany, number 1 in the Netherlands and number 3 in Switzerland. A new version of the song was released in the United Kingdom on 18 August 2013, featuring vocals from Will Heard. In May 2014 they released their second single "Netzwerk (Falls Like Rain)". In July 2014 they released their debut studio album Netzwerk, which includes all three of the singles. Latest hits include "Hey Maria", a single edit released in September 2016.

== Discography ==
=== Albums ===
Title	Album details	Peak chart positions							Certifications
Title	Album details	AUT	BEL (FL)	BEL (WA)	GER	NL	SWI	UK	Certifications
Netzwerk	Released: 28 July 2014; Label: Vertigo, Capitol, Universal; Format: Digital download, CD, vinyl	5	11	24	8	43	2	71	IFPI AUT: Gold
Petrichor	Released: 7 November 2025; Label: Bias Beach; Format: Digital download, CD, vinyl	—	—	—	—	—	—	—	

=== Extended plays ===
Title	EP details
Falls Like Rain	Released: 29 July 2014 (US); Label: Casablanca, Republic; Format: Digital download

=== Singles ===
Title	Year	Peak chart positions											Certifications	Album
Title	Year	AUT	AUS	BEL (FL)	BEL (WA)	DEN	FRA	GER	IRE	NL	SWI	UK	Certifications	Album
"Sonnentanz"	2012	3	—	3	7	31	22	4	—	1	3	—	BEA: Gold; BVMI: 5× Gold; FIMI: Gold; IFPI AUT: Platinum; IFPI SWI: 3× Platinum	Netzwerk
"Sonnentanz (Sun Don't Shine)" (featuring Will Heard)	2013	—	60	—	—	—	—	—	18	—	—	3	BPI: Platinum	Netzwerk
"Netzwerk (Falls Like Rain)"	2014	7	—	17	43	—	190	17	96	—	13	83	BVMI: Gold	Netzwerk
"Sun Don't Shine" (featuring Jaymes Young)	2015	—	—	—	—	—	—	—	—	—	—	—		Non-album singles
"Hey Maria"	2016	—	—	—	—	—	—	—	—	—	—	—		Non-album singles
"In the Crowd Alone"	2016	—	—	—	—	—	—	—	—	—	—	—		Non-album singles
"Time"	2017	—	—	—	—	—	—	—	—	—	—	—		Non-album singles
"Circuits"	2017	—	—	—	—	—	—	—	—	—	—	—		Non-album singles
"Good to Go"	2017	—	—	—	—	—	—	—	—	—	—	—		Non-album singles
"Jericho" (featuring Mando Diao)	2017	—	—	—	—	—	—	—	—	—	—	—		Non-album singles
"Comoros"	2019	—	—	—	—	—	—	—	—	—	—	—		Non-album singles
"Ghostkeeper" (with Givven)	2020	—	—	—	—	—	—	—	—	—	—	—		Non-album singles
"Shipwreck"	2020	—	—	—	—	—	—	—	—	—	—	—		Non-album singles
"My World" (featuring Kyle Pearce)	2020	—	—	—	—	—	—	—	—	—	—	—		Non-album singles
"Follow" (with Givven)	2020	—	—	—	—	—	—	—	—	—	—	—		Non-album singles
"Plastic"	2021	—	—	—	—	—	—	—	—	—	—	—		Non-album singles
"Home"	2021	36	—	—	—	—	—	—	—	—	—	—	IFPI AUT: Gold	Non-album singles
"Air" (with Ten Ven)	2021	—	—	—	—	—	—	—	—	—	—	—		Non-album singles
"Swan Song" (with Ian Urbina)	2021	—	—	—	—	—	—	—	—	—	—	—		Non-album singles
"This Love" (featuring Poppy Baskcomb)	2022	—	—	—	—	—	—	—	—	—	—	—		Non-album singles
"Calling Out Your Name" (featuring Mando Diao)	2022	—	—	—	—	—	—	—	—	—	—	—		Non-album singles
"I Feel Fine"	2022	—	—	—	—	—	—	—	—	—	—	—		Non-album singles
"Sight of You" (featuring LissA)	2022	—	—	—	—	—	—	—	—	—	—	—		Non-album singles
"Roads of Gold" (with Redward Martin)	2023	—	—	—	—	—	—	—	—	—	—	—		Petrichor
"Afterglow" (with GIVVEN)	2024	—	—	—	—	—	—	—	—	—	—	—		Petrichor
"Petrichor" (with GIVVEN)	2024	—	—	—	—	—	—	—	—	—	—	—		Petrichor
"Highs & Lows" (with Toby Romeo and Ely Oaks)	2024	—	—	—	—	—	—	—	—	—	—	—		Non-album single
"Let Me Come to Life"	2025	—	—	—	—	—	—	—	—	—	—	—		Petrichor
"Havana Nights" (featuring Bigger Than Us, Marieme and Sidecar Tommy)	2025	—	—	—	—	—	—	—	—	—	—	—		Non-album single
"Holy Father" (with Oliva)	2025	—	—	—	—	—	—	—	—	—	—	—		Petrichor
"Sun Went Down, Sky Went Dark" (with GIVVEN and Senes)	2025	—	—	—	—	—	—	—	—	—	—	—		Petrichor
"Truth Begins" (with Blazey)	2025	—	—	—	—	—	—	—	—	—	—	—		Petrichor
"The Tide" (featuring Elmar)	2025	—	—	—	—	—	—	—	—	—	—	—		Petrichor
"Cross the Border" (featuring Bloom Twins)	2025	—	—	—	—	—	—	—	—	—	—	—		Petrichor
"—" denotes a single that did not chart or was not released in that territory.

=== Other charted songs ===
Title	Year	Peak chart positions		Album
Title	Year	AUT	BEL (FL) Tip	Album
"Celebrate"	2014	24	—	Netzwerk
"Symmetry"	2014	—	15	Netzwerk
"—" denotes a song that did not chart or was not released in that territory.

== Awards and nominations ==
=== Berlin Music Video Awards ===
The Berlin Music Video Awards is an international festival that promotes the art of music videos.

Year	Nominated work	Award	Result	Ref.
2025	"Afterglow"	Best Cinematography	Nominated	
