= John Newman discography =

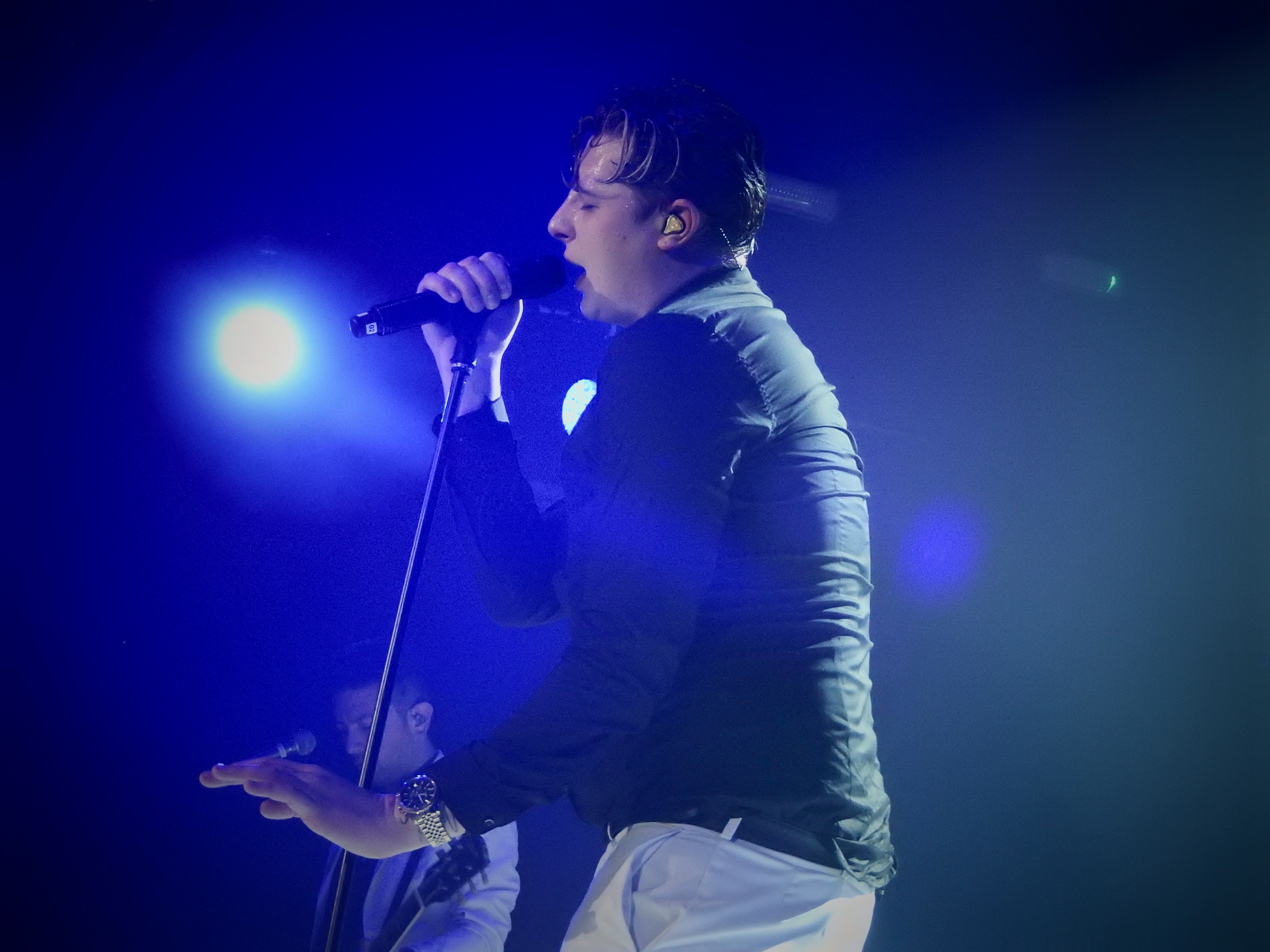
- Newman performing in London, 2015
- Studio albums: 2
- EPs: 1
- Singles: 24
- Featured singles: 5

English singer and DJ John Newman has released two studio albums, 24 singles (excluding five as a featured artist) and an EP.

In May 2012, Newman featured on Rudimental's single "Feel the Love". The single peaked at number one on the UK Singles Chart in early June 2012 and was also a top 5 hit in Australia, Belgium, the Netherlands and New Zealand. The song was later certified 2× platinum by the Australian Recording Industry Association. In November 2012, he featured on Rudimental's follow-up single, "Not Giving In", which peaked at number 14 on the UK Singles Chart. It was also a top 20 hit in Australia and New Zealand. Tribute, Newman's debut studio album, was released in October 2013, the album peaked at number one on the UK Albums Chart. The album includes the singles "Love Me Again", "Cheating", "Losing Sleep" and "Out of My Head". In September 2014, he featured on Calvin Harris' single "Blame", which peaked at number one on the UK Singles Chart. It also topped the charts in Finland, the Netherlands, Norway and Sweden, while charting within the top five in Austria, Germany, Ireland and Italy, and the top ten in Australia, Denmark, France, New Zealand and Spain. Revolve, Newman's second studio album, was released in October 2015, the album peaked at number three on the UK Albums Chart. The album includes the singles "Come and Get It" and "Tiring Game". In April 2016, he featured on the Sigala single "Give Me Your Love" alongside Nile Rodgers, which peaked at number nine on the UK Singles Chart.

Standalone single releases include "Olé", "Fire in Me", "Feelings", "Stand by Me" and "High on You".

== Studio albums ==
Title	Album details	Peak chart positions											Certifications
Title	Album details	UK	AUS	AUT	BEL	GER	IRE	NL	NZ	SCO	SWI	US	Certifications
Tribute	Released: 14 October 2013; Label: Island, Universal; Format: CD, LP, digital download	1	7	20	33	21	8	51	6	1	11	24	BPI: Platinum; IFPI AUT: Gold; IFPI SWI: Gold; RMNZ: Platinum
Revolve	Released: 16 October 2015; Label: Island, Universal; Format: CD, LP, digital download	3	94	—	61	61	67	37	—	3	29	—	RMNZ: Gold
"—" denotes album that did not chart or was not released.

== Extended plays ==
Title	Details
A.N.i.M.A.L	Released: 27 September 2019; Label: Island, Universal; Formats: digital download

== Singles ==
=== As lead artist ===
Title	Year	Peak chart positions										Certifications	Album
Title	Year	UK	AUS	AUT	BEL	GER	IRE	NL	NZ	SWI	US	Certifications	Album
"Love Me Again"	2013	1	4	5	6	6	3	19	9	5	30	BPI: 3× Platinum; ARIA: 2× Platinum; BEA: Gold; BVMI: Platinum; IFPI SWI: Platinum; RIAA: Platinum; RMNZ: 3× Platinum	Tribute
"Cheating"	2013	9	75	51	53	53	19	—	—	56	—		Tribute
"Losing Sleep"	2013	48	—	—	65	57	31	—	—	29	—		Tribute
"Out of My Head"	2014	91	—	—	78	—	—	—	—	—	—		Tribute
"Come and Get It"	2015	5	—	43	53	70	53	69	—	29	—	BPI: Silver	Revolve
"Tiring Game" (featuring Charlie Wilson)	2015	134	—	—	65	—	—	—	—	—	—		Revolve
"Olé"	2016	120	—	—	66	—	—	—	—	—	—		Non-album singles
"Fire in Me"	2018	— (Note: "Fire in Me" did not enter the UK Singles Chart, but peaked at number 59 on the UK Singles Downloads Chart.)	—	—	—	—	—	—	—	—	—		Non-album singles
"Feelings"	2019	—	—	—	—	—	—	—	— (Note: "Feelings" did not enter the NZ Top 40 Singles Chart, but peaked at number 27 on the NZ Hot Singles Chart.)	—	—		Non-album singles
"Without You" (with Nina Nesbitt)	2019	— (Note: "Without You" did not enter the UK Singles Chart, but peaked at number 29 on the UK Singles Downloads Chart.)	—	—	—	—	—	—	—	—	—		A.N.i.M.A.L
"Stand by Me"	2020	— (Note: "Stand by Me" did not enter the UK Singles Chart, but peaked at number 31 on the UK Singles Downloads Chart.)	—	—	—	—	—	—	—	—	—		Non-album single
"High on You" (with Sigma)	2020	—	—	—	—	—	—	—	—	—	—		Hope
"If You Really Love Me (How Will I Know)" (with David Guetta and MistaJam)	2021	27	—	39	—	40	30	—	— (Note: "If You Really Love Me (How Will I Know)" did not enter the NZ Top 40 Singles Chart, but peaked at number 21 on the NZ Hot Singles Chart.)	66	—	BPI: Gold	Non-album singles
"Waiting for a Lifetime"	2022	—	—	—	—	—	—	—	—	—	—		Non-album singles
"Holy Love"	2022	—	—	—	—	—	—	—	—	—	—		Non-album singles
"Hold On to My Love"	2023	—	—	—	—	—	—	—	—	—	—		Non-album singles
"Call Your Name" (with Alesso)	2023	―	―	—	―	―	―	―	―	―	―		Non-album singles
"Guiding Light"	2023	—	—	—	—	—	—	—	—	—	—		Non-album singles
"Something in the Water" (as SIX40TWO)	2025	—	—	—	—	—	—	—	—	—	—		Non-album singles
"What Would I Do" (as SIX40TWO)	2025	—	—	—	—	—	—	—	—	—	—		Non-album singles
"Merry Go"	2026	—	—	—	—	—	—	—	—	—	—		Non-album singles
"Throw Me A Line"	2026	—	—	—	—	—	—	—	—	—	—		Non-album singles
"—" denotes single that did not chart or was not released in that territory.

=== As featured artist ===
Title	Year	Peak chart positions										Certifications	Album
Title	Year	UK	AUS	AUT	BEL	DEN	GER	IRE	NL	NZ	US	Certifications	Album
"Feel the Love" (Rudimental featuring John Newman)	2012	1	3	14	2	26	59	26	2	4	—	BPI: 3× Platinum; ARIA: 2× Platinum; BEA: Gold; RMNZ: 4× Platinum	Home
"Not Giving In" (Rudimental featuring John Newman and Alex Clare)	2012	14	12	—	54	—	—	54	71	11	—	BPI: Platinum; ARIA: 2× Platinum; RMNZ: 2× Platinum	Home
"Blame" (Calvin Harris featuring John Newman)	2014	1	9	4	2	6	4	5	3	9	19	BPI: 3× Platinum; ARIA: 4× Platinum; BVMI: Gold; IFPI DEN: Platinum; IFPI SWI: Gold; RIAA: 3× Platinum; RMNZ: 3× Platinum	Motion
"Give Me Your Love" (Sigala featuring John Newman and Nile Rodgers)	2016	9	83	50	—	—	55	63	64	—	—	BPI: Platinum; RMNZ: Gold	Brighter Days
"Bridge over Troubled Water" (as part of Artists for Grenfell)	2017	1	53	32	26	—	—	25	—	— (Note: "Bridge over Troubled Water" did not enter the NZ Top 40 Singles Chart, but peaked at number four on the NZ Heatseekers Singles Chart.)	—	BPI: Gold	Non-album single
"Gone" (SwitchOTR featuring John Newman)	2022	—	—	—	—	—	—	—	—	—	—		Non-album single
"The Reason" (Gryffin featuring John Newman)	2024	—	—	—	—	—	—	—	—	—	—		Pulse
"—" denotes single that did not chart or was not released in that territory.

== Music videos ==
Title	Year	Director
"Love Me Again"	2013	Vaughan Arnell
"Love Me Again" (version 2)	2013	Vaughan Arnell
"Cheating"	2013	David Mould
"Losing Sleep"	2013	Corin Hardy
"Out of My Head"	2014	Luc Janin
"Come and Get It"	2015	Alex Herron
"Tiring Game" (featuring Charlie Wilson)	2015	Alex Herron
"I'm Not Your Man"	2015	Danny Gold
"Olé"	2016	Emil Nava
"Fire in Me"	2018	Ozzie Pullin
"Feelings"	2019	Chris Turner

== Guest appearances ==
List of non-single guest appearances, with other performing artists, showing year released and album name
Title	Year	Other artist(s)	Album
"Never Let You Go"	2017	Kygo	Kids in Love
"Crawling" (Note: John Newman's feature in "Crawling" was uncredited.)	2017	Chase & Status	Tribe
"Hurricane"	2020	Galantis	Church

== Songwriting credits ==
Title	Year	Artist(s)	Album	Written with
"Feel the Love" (featuring John Newman)	2013	Rudimental	Home	Amir Amor, Piers Aggett, Kesi Dryden
"Not Giving In" (featuring John Newman and Alex Clare)	2013	Rudimental	Home	Amir Amor, Piers Aggett, Kesi Dryden
"Blame" (featuring John Newman)	2014	Calvin Harris	Motion	Adam Wiles, James Newman
"Faith"	2014	Calvin Harris	Motion	Adam Wiles, Steve McCutcheon
"Lock Me Up"	2014	The Cab	Lock Me Up EP	Wayne Hector, Steve McCutcheon
"Fire"	2014	Jessie J	Sweet Talker	Steve Brooker
"I Don't Care"	2014	Cheryl	Only Human	Cheryl Tweedy, Bonnie McKee, Klas Ahlund
"Stick With Me"	2014	Olly Murs	Never Been Better	Wayne Hector, Steve McCutcheon
"Everything But You"	2014	Bonnie McKee		Klas Åhlund, Bonnie McKee
"Wasted Youth"	2015	Bonnie McKee	Bombastic EP	Bonnie McKee, Sean Walsh
"Give Me Your Love" (featuring John Newman and Nile Rodgers)	2016	Sigala	Brighter Days	Bruce Fielder, Steven Manovski, Nile Rodgers
"New Addiction"	2017	Charlie Wilson	In It to Win It	Charlie Wilson, Jonathan Reuven Rotem, Andrew Jackson
"More Mess" (featuring Olly Murs and Coely)	2017	Kungs	Non-album single	Valentin Brunel, Niels van Malderen, Filip Korte, Coely Mbueno, Yan Gaudeuille, Boris Gieger, Laurent Levi, Julien Sannicolo, Jan Weissenfeldt
"Unknown (To You)"	2017	Jacob Banks	Non-album single	Jacob Banks, Zane Lowe
"Never Let You Go" (featuring John Newman)	2017	Kygo	Kids in Love	Kyrre Gorvell-Dahll
"Crawling"	2017	Chase & Status	Tribe	Saul Milton, William Kennard, John Ryan II, Daniel Dodd Wilson
"Til' I'm Done"	2017	Paloma Faith	The Architect	Paloma Faith, Thomas Barnes, Peter Kelleher, Benjamin Kohn, Wayne Hector
"Dancing's Not a Crime"	2018	Panic! at the Disco	Pray for the Wicked	Panic! at the Disco, Jake Sinclair, Ajay Bhattacharyya, Jonathan Hill, Samuel Hollander, Kenneth Harris, Christopher Allen
"Stay the Night"	2018	The Shires	Accidentally on Purpose	Edward Sheeran, Johnny McDaid, James Newman
"Higher"	2020	Bishop Briggs	TBA	Bishop Briggs, Johnny Coffer
"Hurricane" (featuring John Newman)	2020	Galantis	Church	Steve Booker, Christian ‘Bloodshy’ Karlsson, Jan Postmas, Jordi Thom Corne de Fluiter
"High On You" (featuring John Newman)	2020	Sigma	Single	Christopher Tempest, George Henry Tizzard, Rick Parkhouse, Sam Preston
"By Your Side" (featuring Tom Grennan)	2021	Calvin Harris	Single	Tom Grennan, Calvin Harris
"Cartoon Earthquake"	2023	Blondshell	Blondshell (Deluxe Edition)	Sabrina Teitelbaum
