= Silver Bullet =

Silver Bullet(s) or The Silver Bullet may refer to:

- Silver bullet, in folklore, a weapon against supernatural creatures; metaphorically, a simple, effective solution to a problem

== Film and television ==
- The Silver Bullet (1935 film), an American western film
- The Silver Bullet (1942 film), an American western film
- Silver Bullet (film), a 1985 horror film by Daniel Attias
- Silver Bullets, a 2011 film by Joe Swanberg

== Music ==
- Silver Bullet (rapper) (born 1972), British rapper
- Silver Bullets (album) or the title song, by the Chills, 2015
- "Silver Bullet", a song by Hawthorne Heights from The Silence in Black and White
- "Silver Bullet", a song by Pixies from Beneath the Eyrie
- Silver Bullet Band, the 1970s–1990s backing band for Bob Seger

== Places and structures ==
- Silver Bullet (Frontier City), a roller coaster in Oklahoma City, Oklahoma, US
- Silver Bullet (Knott's Berry Farm), a roller coaster in Buena Park, California, US
- The Silver Bullet, a music venue in London

== Other ==
- Silver Bullet (car), a 1929 unsuccessful land speed record car
- Colorado Silver Bullets, a women's baseball team
- Comics Bulletin, originally Silver Bullet Comics, a website covering the American comic-book industry
- Coors Light, a beer referred to as "the Silver Bullet" in marketing campaigns
  - Two BD-5J aircraft used by Coors for marketing in the 1980s and early 1990s
- Hughes H-1 Racer or Silver Bullet, a 1935 racing aircraft

== See also ==
- Silver Bullet Express, a 1990s ski train in Maine, US
- "No Silver Bullet", a 1986 paper on software engineering by Fred Brooks
