= Feelings (John Newman song) =

Single by John Newman
- Released: 8 March 2019
- Length: 3:02
- Label: Island
- Songwriter(s): Emma Bertilsson; Fredrik Haggstam; John Newman; Litens Anton Nilsson; Nirob Islam
- Producer(s): Freddy Alexander; Jarly; John Newman

John Newman singles chronology
| "Fire in Me" (2018) | "Feelings" (2019) | "Without You" (2019) |

"Feelings" is a song by English singer John Newman. The song was released as a digital download on 8 March 2019 by Island Records. The song was written by Emma Bertilsson, Fredrik Haggstam, John Newman, Litens Anton Nilsson and Nirob Islam.

== Background ==
Newman was ready to quit when "Olé" failed to chart back in 2016, he said, "I was on the phone to my manager and I was saying 'I want to give up. I'm done'. I wasn't releasing the kind of music I should have been and there were too many chefs in the kitchen. I was so sick of it." He describes the song as a return to 'sing-along bangers', he also said, "I never want to experience the feeling of having a flop again. I have to reconnect with people." The song then failed to chart in the UK.

== Track listing ==
Digital download
| No. | Title | Length |
|---|---|---|
| 1. | "Feelings" | 3:02 |

Digital download
| No. | Title | Length |
|---|---|---|
| 1. | "Feelings" (Eden Prince Remix) | 3:02 |

== Personnel ==
Credits adapted from Tidal.

- Freddy Alexander – producer, associated performer, co-producer, programming
- Jarly – producer, co-producer
- John Newman – producer, composer, lyricist, associated performer, background vocalist, co-producer, vocals
- Emma Bertilsson – composer, lyricist
- Fredrik Haggstam – composer, lyricist
- Litens Anton Nilsson – composer, lyricist
- Nirob Islam – composer, lyricist
- Bill Zimmerman – assistant mixer, studio personnel
- Nana Maria Berqvist – associated performer, percussion
- Sharlene Hector – associated performer, background vocalist
- Vula Malinga – associated performer, background vocalist
- Phil Tan – mix engineer, studio personnel

== Charts ==
| Chart (2019) | Peak position |
|---|---|
| New Zealand Hot Singles (RMNZ) | 27 |

== Release history ==
| Region | Date | Format | Label |
|---|---|---|---|
| United Kingdom | 8 March 2019 | Digital download; streaming | Island Records |
