= Fire in Me =

Single by John Newman
- Released: 9 March 2018
- Length: 4:05
- Label: Island
- Songwriters: John Newman; James Newman; Phil Plested; David Mørup
- Producers: Dehiro; John Newman; Mark Ralph

John Newman singles chronology
"Olé" (2016)	"Fire in Me" (2018)	"Feelings" (2019)

"Fire in Me" is a song by English singer John Newman. The song was released as a digital download on 9 March 2018 by Island Records. The song peaked at number 59 on the Scottish Singles Chart. The song was written by John Newman, James Newman, Phil Plested and David Mørup.

== Background ==
In an interview with Metro, Newman said, "I've got new music, lots of it as well. I'm bombarding you. I've been hiding and writing and just waiting until the time is right to release loads. I've lost the pressure, it's been too long. I've taken time away, I'm making music I want to make. I've always been doing that but I felt like I lost myself a little. But it feels good to be back."

== Track listing ==
Digital download
No.	Title	Length
1.	"Fire in Me"	4:05

Digital download
No.	Title	Length
1.	"Fire in Me" (Martin Jensen Remix)	3:09

Digital download
No.	Title	Length
1.	"Fire in Me" (Sigala Remix)	3:39

== Personnel ==
Credits adapted from Tidal.

- Dehiro – producer, co-producer
- John Newman – producer, composer, lyricist, associated performer, co-producer, marimba, organ, percussion, string arranger, synthesizer, vocals
- Mark Ralph – producer, associated performer, bass guitar, co-producer, keyboards, synthesizer
- David Mørup – composer, lyricist, associated performer, guitar, keyboards, percussion
- James Newman – composer, lyricist, associated performer, background vocalist
- Phil Plested – composer, lyricist, associated performer, background vocalist
- Robin Florent – assistant mixer, studio personnel
- Scott Desmarais – assistant mixer, studio personnel
- Ava Ralph – associated performer, saxophone
- Max McElligott – associated performer, background vocalist
- Scott Ralph – associated performer, bass trombone, trombone, trumpet
- Pete Hutchings – engineer, studio personnel
- Tom AD Fuller – engineer, studio personnel
- Matt Colton – mastering engineer, studio personnel
- Chris Galland – mix engineer, studio personnel
- Manny Marroquin – mixer, studio personnel

== Charts ==
Chart (2018)	Peak position
Belarus Airplay (Eurofest)	5
Scottish Singles Sales (Official Charts)	59
UK Singles Downloads (Official Charts)	59

== Release history ==
Region	Date	Format	Label
United Kingdom	9 March 2018	Digital download; streaming	Island Records
