= Tara Priya =

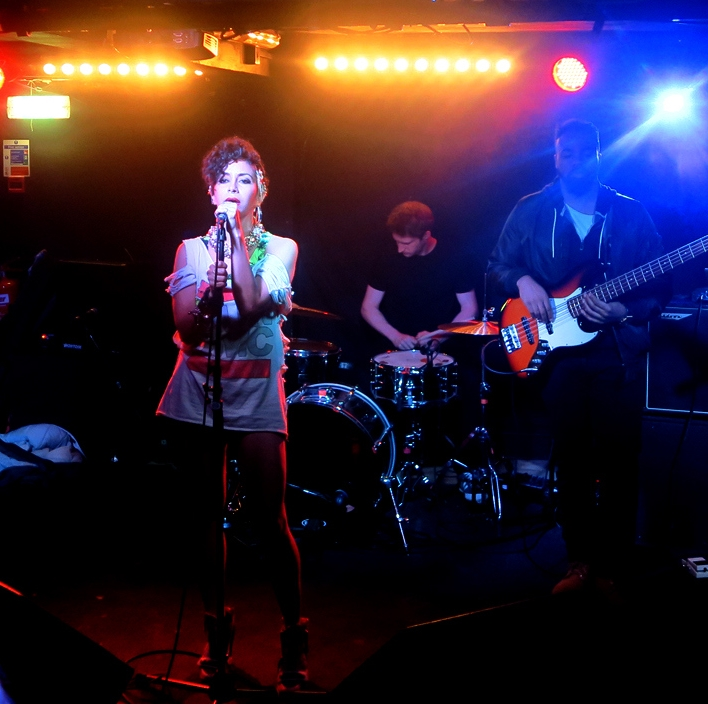
- London-based musician Tara Priya performing at the Sebright Arms in east London's Bethnal Green neighbourhood.

Background information
- Also known as: Tara Priya
- Born: Tara Priya Chandra; December 3, 1989 (age 36); San Francisco Bay Area, California
- Genres: Soul music, Pop, blue-eyed soul, R&B
- Occupation: Singer-songwriter
- Years active: 2012–present
- Labels: P-Vine Records (Japan), Avex Group
- Website: http://www.tarapriya.com

Tara Priya (born Tara Priya Chandra) is a London-based American singer-songwriter and vocalist. Tara Priya was born in San Francisco to a Persian mother, the niece of poet Sohrab Sepehri, and an Indian father.

== Early life ==
Tara Priya attended The Harker School in San Jose prior to Columbia University in New York City. Priya majored in economics while studying jazz and classical voice. After graduating from Columbia two years early, Priya moved to Los Angeles to focus on her career as a singer-songwriter. She started off by singing hooks on rap demos in underground hip-hop studios in exchange for recording time for her own R&B/soul music.

== Career ==
Immediately after releasing a six-track Motown-inspired EP, Priya was nominated as one of the Best Emerging Artists by The Deli Magazine. Shortly after, Priya was selected as one of three "Pop" genre finalists of the John Lennon Songwriting Contest and named a category winner in the Billboard Song Contest.

In January 2012, Priya signed to Japanese indie P-Vine Records after her EP was discovered in a record shop in Kobe, Japan. There, her first radio single "Run Like Hell" peaked at number 25 on the Billboard Japan Hot 100 and number six on the Billboard Japan Digital and Airplay chart. This led to two subsequent tours of Japan, through Tower Records and Billboard Live, respectively.

Clear Entertainment, a subsidiary of David Letterman's Worldwide Pants Incorporated, signed Priya to their management roster. The following March, Priya showcased at SXSW 2013 in Austin, TX, after which she was named an "emerging icon" by The Huffington Post. She then moved to London to work with British music producer Steve Booker on her 2014 album, Shot in the Dark, which was released in Asia by P-Vine Records and published by the Avex Group.

In autumn 2014, British popular music and fashion magazine and website Clash premiered new music from Priya, noting that the track was "somewhere between classic soul, trip hop and the slumped productions of J Dilla". The track, titled "One Foot Out", was co-produced by Priya and represented a significant departure from her earlier music. Subsequent releases throughout 2015 gained her UK press and radio support, including by Time Out London, BBC Radio 2's Jamie Cullum, Tom Robinson of BBC Radio 6 Music, and UK record label and club Ministry of Sound.

In November 2016, The Independent premiered new music from Tara Priya, noting the singer "has been tipped for big things" and comparing her "sensual trip hop and soul" sound to fellow Londoner Sinéad Harnett.

== Discography ==
- Tara Priya (2012)
- Shot in the Dark (2014)
- Friends Like These (EP) (2015)
