= Steve Booker (producer) =

British music producer and songwriter

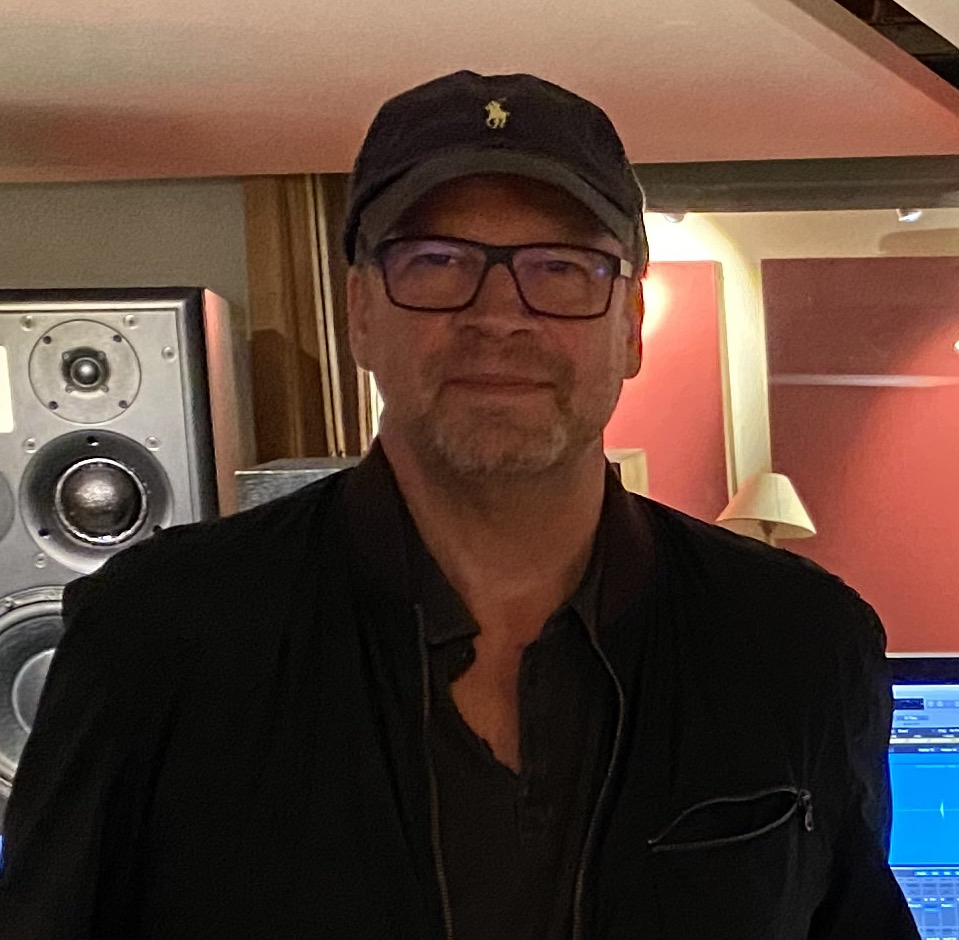

Background information
- Genres: Pop, EDM, rock, soul
- Occupations: Record producer, songwriter, musician
- Years active: 1980s-present
- Website: stevebooker.com

Steve Booker is a British music producer, songwriter and musician. His production and writing credits include the international No.1 singles; John Newman's "Love Me Again" for which Booker was nominated for the 2014 Ivor Novello Award for Best Song Musically and Lyrically and Duffy's "Mercy" for which Booker won the Ivor Novello Award for most performed work. Prior to becoming a producer Booker was a singer-songwriter who released two solo albums – "Dreamworld" (1990) and the 1996 mini-album "A Far Cry From Here".

== Career ==
It was while Booker was in Nashville recording his second solo album A Far Cry From Here that he "fell in love with co-writing" and decided to stay and make a living from professional songwriting. During this time his cuts included "Too Far From Texas" for Stevie Nicks' Trouble in Shangri-La album and "What Are You Waiting For", which was by Lindsay Lohan.

Booker collaborated with Duffy, producing and co-writing four songs on her debut album Rockferry; including producing and co-writing the international No.1 "Mercy", "Stepping Stone", "Rain on Your Parade" and "Breaking My Own Heart".

In 2009 Booker won the ASCAP Writers Award for Mercy also the 2009 Ivor Novello Award for Most Performed Work and the 51st Grammy Award for Best Pop Vocal Album for Rockferry. "Mercy" was also nominated for Best Female Pop Vocal Performance.

Booker collaborated with Melissa Etheridge, co-producing three songs on her 2012 album: "4th Street Feeling" and Lisa Marie Presley, co-writing "Forgiving" on her 2012 album Storm & Grace. He co-wrote and produced "Run Free" on the December 2011 album Heaven by Rebecca Ferguson and co-wrote and produced "Rollin'" on Ferguson's 2013 album Freedom.

Booker collaborated with John Newman, co-writing six songs on Newman's 2013 debut album Tribute, including co-producing and co-writing the international smash debut No.1 single "Love Me Again", for which booker was nominated for the 2014 Ivor Novello Award for Best Song Musically and Lyrically. Booker also co-produced and co-wrote "Losing Sleep" and co-wrote "Out of My Head", "All I Need Is You", "Easy" and "Try"

Recent releases include Illenium feat. Tori Kelly "Blame Myself", Adam Lambert "Stranger You Are" from the Velvet album and Galantis feat. John Newman "Hurricane" from the Church album.

== Discography ==
- 2021 Illenium feat. Tori Kelly – Blame Myself (co-writer)
- 2020 Galantis feat. John Newman – Hurricane (co-writer)
- 2020 House Gospel Choir – Keep On Movin' (co-writer)
- 2019 Adam Lambert – Stranger You Are (producer and co-writer)
- 2014 Jessie J – Fire (producer and co-writer)
- 2014 Alex Clare – War Rages On – (producer and co-writer)
- 2014 Tara Priya – Who You Do – (producer and co-writer)
- 2014 Tara Priya – Sleaze – (producer and co-writer)
- 2014 Tara Priya – Good As Dead – (producer and co-writer)
- 2014 Tara Priya – Misery – (producer and co-writer)
- 2013 Rebecca Ferguson – Rollin' (producer and co-writer)
- 2013 John Newman – Love Me Again (co-producer and co-writer)
- 2013 John Newman – Losing Sleep (co-writer)
- 2013 John Newman – Easy (co-writer)
- 2013 John Newman – Try (co-writer)
- 2013 John Newman – Out of My Head (co-write)
- 2013 John Newman – All I Need Is You (co-writer)
- 2013 Jamie Cullum – Edge of Something (co-writer)
- 2012: Delta Goodrem – When My Stars Come Out (Producer)
- 2012 Melissa Etheridge – 4th Street Feeling (co-producer)
- 2012 Melissa Etheridge – Be Real (co-producer)
- 2012 Melissa Etheridge – Just What You Asked For (co-producer)
- 2012 Lisa Marie Presley – Forgiving (co-writer)
- 2011 Dionne Bromfield – Good for the Soul (producer and co-writer)
- 2011 Dionne Bromfield – Sweetest Thing (producer and co-writer)
- 2011 Dionne Bromfield – Too Soon To Call It Love (producer and co-writer)
- 2011 Dionne Bromfield – Time Will Tell (producer and co-writer)
- 2011 Dionne Bromfield – Don't Make It True (producer and co-writer)
- 2011 Dionne Bromfield – Lost in Love (producer and co-writer)
- 2011 Rebecca Ferguson – Run Free (producer and co-writer)
- 2009 Alexandra Burke – You Broke My Heart (producer and co-writer)
- 2009 Westlife – Another World (producer and co-writer)
- 2008 Duffy – Mercy (producer, engineer, mixer and co-writer)
- 2008 Duffy – Stepping Stone (producer, engineer, mixer and co-writer)
- 2008 Duffy – Breaking My Own Heart (producer, engineer, mixer and co-writer)
- 2008 Duffy – Rain on Your Parade (producer, engineer, mixer and co-writer)
- 2008 Sugababes – Sunday Rain (producer, engineer, mixer and co-writer)
- 2008 Sugababes – Sound of Goodbye (producer, engineer, mixer and co-writer)
- 2008 Jack Savoretti – Gipsy Love (producer and co-writer)
- 2008 Jack Savoretti – Dreamers (co-writer)
- 2001 Stevie Nicks with Natalie Maines – Too Far From Texas (co-writer)
