= Out of My Head (John Newman song) =

Single by John Newman

from the album Tribute
- Released: 4 April 2014
- Recorded: 2012–13
- Genre: Pop; soul; breakbeat
- Length: 3:49
- Label: Island
- Songwriter(s): John Newman; Steve Booker
- Producer(s): John Newman; Ant Whiting

John Newman singles chronology
"Losing Sleep" (2013)	"Out of My Head" (2014)	"Blame" (2014)

"Out of My Head" is a song by English singer John Newman. The song was released on 4 April 2014 as the fourth single from his debut studio album, Tribute (2013). The song was written by John Newman and Steve Booker. The song peaked to number 91 on the UK Singles Chart.

== Background ==
On 4 April 2014, Newman released a club edit of Out of My Head, as well as an EP which includes a remix by Naughty Boy. Talking to Digital Spy about Naughty Boy, he said "Naughty Boy, where do I start? This guy is one of the finest we have, his marketing ideas around Hotel Cabana were breakthrough. His work with Emeli Sandé was breakthrough. His productions and songwriting is so modern, yet so timeless and at the next level and now he shows remixes are no issue either! Such a pleasure to work with this guy musically and personally and can't wait to do more with him in the future and to also hear the amazing new levels he will continue to bring to the world of music.

== Music video ==
A music video to accompany the release of "Out of My Head" was first released onto YouTube on 12 February 2014 at a total length of three minutes and fifty-five seconds, directed by Luc Janin. A second video for the song was uploaded to YouTube on 12 March 2014 for the Club Edit of the song.

== Track listing ==
Digital download – single
No.	Title	Length
1.	"Out of My Head" (Club Edit)	3:47

Digital download – remixes
No.	Title	Length
1.	"Out of My Head" (John Newman Rework)	3:49
2.	"Out of My Head" (Naughty Boy Remix)	4:21
3.	"Out of My Head" (Soul Clap Remix)	6:53
4.	"Out of My Head" (Live At The Battersea Arts Centre)	3:57

== Credits and personnel ==
- Lead vocals – John Newman
- Lyrics – John Newman, Steve Booker
- Producers – John Newman, Ant Whiting
- Label – Island

== Charts ==
Chart (2014)	Peak position
Belgium (Ultratip Bubbling Under Flanders)	77
Belgium (Ultratip Bubbling Under Wallonia)	39
UK Singles (The Official Charts Company)	91

== Release history ==
Region	Date	Format	Label
United Kingdom	4 April 2014	Digital download	Island
