= Losing Sleep (John Newman song) =

Single by John Newman

from the album Tribute
- Released: 15 December 2013
- Recorded: 2012–13
- Genre: Pop; soul
- Length: 4:42
- Label: Island
- Songwriters: John Newman; Steve Booker; Benny Blanco
- Producers: John Newman; Mike Spencer; Ant Whiting; Steve Booker

John Newman singles chronology
"Cheating" (2013)	"Losing Sleep" (2013)	"Out of My Head" (2014)

"Losing Sleep" is a song by English singer John Newman. The song was released on 13 December 2013 as the third single from his debut studio album, Tribute (2013). The song was written by John Newman, Steve Booker and Benny Blanco. The song peaked to number 48 on the UK Singles Chart and number 36 in Scotland.

== Music video ==
A music video, directed by Corin Hardy, accompanied the release of "Losing Sleep" and was first released onto YouTube on 26 November 2013 at a total length of four minutes and twenty-three seconds.

== Critical reception ==
Robert Copsey of Digital Spy gave the song a positive review stating:

As if 2013 wasn't a good enough year for John Newman – he scored a number one album and single back in October – it's looking increasingly likely that things are only going to get bigger and better for him 2014. His debut single 'Love Me Again' has, unsurprisingly, started making waves in the US and recently entered the Billboard Hot 100, where it looks set for steady ascent. As such, you'd expect that he's been losing out on a few hours' kip in recent months, but it's actually a love interest that's causing him sleepless nights on his latest offering. "It's 3am, I'm calling in to tell you that without you here I'm losing sleep," he sings in his powerful yet gravely tone over militant handclaps and a moody, soul-pop piano line – before making a passionate plea for his lover not to forget about him. We hate to break it to you, John, but global fame doesn't come without difficult compromises.

== Track listing ==
Digital download – single
No.	Title	Length
1.	"Losing Sleep"	4:42

Digital download – EP
No.	Title	Length
1.	"Losing Sleep" (TÂCHES Remix)	4:09
2.	"Losing Sleep" (Disciples Remix)	5:15
3.	"Losing Sleep" (Kat Krazy Remix)	3:50
4.	"Losing Sleep" (Breakage Remix)	3:45

== Credits and personnel ==
- Lead vocals – John Newman
- Lyrics – John Newman, Steve Booker and Benny Blanco
- Producers – John Newman, Mike Spencer, Ant Whiting and Steve Booker
- Label – Island

== Chart performance ==
=== Weekly charts ===
Chart (2013–14)	Peak position
Belgium (Ultratip Bubbling Under Flanders)	15
Belgium (Ultratip Bubbling Under Wallonia)	33
Germany (GfK)	57
Hungary (Rádiós Top 40)	10
Ireland (IRMA)	31
Scotland Singles (OCC)	36
Slovakia Airplay (ČNS IFPI)	22
Switzerland (Schweizer Hitparade)	29
UK Singles (The Official Charts Company)	48

=== Year-end charts ===
Chart (2014)	Position
Hungary (Rádiós Top 40)	79

== Release history ==
Region	Date	Format	Label
United Kingdom	15 December 2013	Digital download	Island
