= Without You (John Newman and Nina Nesbitt song) =

Single by John Newman & Nina Nesbitt

from the EP A.N.i.M.A.L
- Released: 30 August 2019
- Length: 3:27
- Label: Island Records
- Songwriters: Adam Argyle; Andrew Jackson; Cleo Tighe; John Newman; Nina Nesbitt; Tommy Baxter
- Producers: John Newman; Ritual

John Newman singles chronology
"Feelings" (2019)	"Without You" (2019)	"Stand by Me" (2020)

Nina Nesbitt singles chronology
"Afterhours" (2019)	"Without You" (2019)	"Black & Blue" (2019)

"Without You" is a song by English singer John Newman and Scottish singer Nina Nesbitt. The song was released as a digital download on 30 August 2019 by Island Records as the lead single from Newman's EP A.N.i.M.A.L. The song peaked at number 21 on the Scottish Singles Chart.

== Background ==
Talking about the collaboration, Nesbitt said, "I'm very excited to be on John’s new single 'Without You'. He's been so fun to work with and I've been a fan of his music for a long time." Newman said, "I have also been a fan of Nina and always loved working with her, it was an easy decision to get her on this stonker! We're glad it was an easy decision as we love the outcome of this collaboration!"

== Track listing ==
Digital download
No.	Title	Length
1.	"Without You"	3:27

Digital download
No.	Title	Length
1.	"Without You" (DFUX Remix)	2:53

== Personnel ==
Credits adapted from Tidal.

- John Newman – producer, co-producer, vocals
- Ritual – producer, co-producer
- Adam Argyle – composer, lyricist
- Andrew Jackson – composer, lyricist
- Cleo Tighe – composer, lyricist
- John Newman – composer, lyricist, associated performer
- Nina Nesbitt – composer, lyricist, associated performer, vocals
- Tommy Baxter – composer, lyricist, associated performer, bass, guitar, keyboards
- Adam Midgley – associated performer, drum programming
- Nina Bergqvist – associated performer, background vocalist
- Stuart Hawkes – mastering engineer, studio personnel
- Emre Ramazanoglu – mixer, studio personnel

== Charts ==
Chart (2019)	Peak position
Scotland Singles (OCC)	21

== Release history ==
Region	Date	Format	Label
United Kingdom	30 August 2019	Digital download; streaming	Island Records
