= Stand by Me (John Newman song) =

Single by John Newman
- Released: 6 March 2020
- Length: 2:51
- Label: Island
- Songwriters: Emma Bertilsson; Fredrik Haggstam; John Newman; Litens Anton Nilsson
- Producer: Steve Mac

John Newman singles chronology
"Without You" (2019)	"Stand by Me" (2020)	"High on You" (2020)

"Stand by Me" is a song by English singer John Newman. The song was released as a digital download on 6 March 2020 by Island Records. The song peaked at number 24 on the Scottish Singles Chart. The song was written by Kiddo, Fredrik Haggstam, John Newman and Litens Anton Nilsson.

== Track listing ==
Digital download
No.	Title	Length
1.	"Stand by Me"	2:51

Digital download
No.	Title	Length
1.	"Stand by Me" (Tiësto Remix)	2:49

== Personnel ==
Credits adapted from Tidal.

- Steve Mac – producer, keyboards
- Emma Bertilsson – composer, lyricist
- Fredrik Haggstam – composer, lyricist
- John Newman – composer, lyricist, vocals
- Litens Anton Nilsson – composer, lyricist
- Cherice Kirton – background vocalist
- David Francis – background vocalist
- Emily Holligan – background vocalist
- Trevor Francis – background vocalist
- Chris Laurence – bass
- Richard Pryce – bass
- Steve Pearce – bass guitar
- Caroline Day – cello
- Martin Loveday – cello
- Nick Cooper – cello
- Tony Woollard – cello
- Abbey Ennis – clapping
- Chris Laws – drum programming, recording engineer, studio personnel
- Carlos Garcia – guitar
- Freddy Alexander – guitar
- Phil Tan – mixer, studio personnel
- David Arch – orchestra leader
- Dann Pursey – percussion, recording engineer, studio personnel

== Charts ==
Chart performance for "Stand by Me"
Chart (2020)	Peak position
Scotland Singles (OCC)	24
UK Singles Downloads (OCC)	31

== Release history ==
Release history for "Stand by Me"
Region	Date	Format	Label
United Kingdom	6 March 2020	Digital download; streaming	Island
