= Tiring Game =

Single by John Newman featuring Charlie Wilson

from the album Revolve
- Released: 26 August 2015
- Recorded: 2015
- Genre: Soul; funk
- Length: 3:23
- Label: Island
- Songwriters: John Newman; Charlie Wilson
- Producers: Jack Splash; John Newman; Greg Kurstin

John Newman singles chronology
"Come and Get It" (2015)	"Tiring Game" (2015)	"Give Me Your Love" (2016)

Charlie Wilson singles chronology
"Fucking Young / Perfect" (2015)	"Tiring Game" (2015)

"Tiring Game" is a song by English singer John Newman. It features the vocals from American singer Charlie Wilson. The song was released on 26 August 2015 as the second single from his second studio album, Revolve (2015). This song also included as soundtrack in EA Sports game, FIFA 16. John Newman created a remix of the song, which he performed live in his sets.

== Music video ==
A music video to accompany the release of "Tiring Game" was first released onto YouTube on 26 August 2015 at a total length of three minutes and forty-three seconds.

== Track listing ==
Digital download
No.	Title	Length
1.	"Tiring Game" (featuring Charlie Wilson)	3:23

== Charts ==
Chart (2015)	Peak position
Scotland Singles (OCC)	55
UK Singles (Official Charts Company)	134

== Release history ==
Region	Date	Format	Label
United Kingdom	26 August 2015	Digital download	Island
