= Ski train =

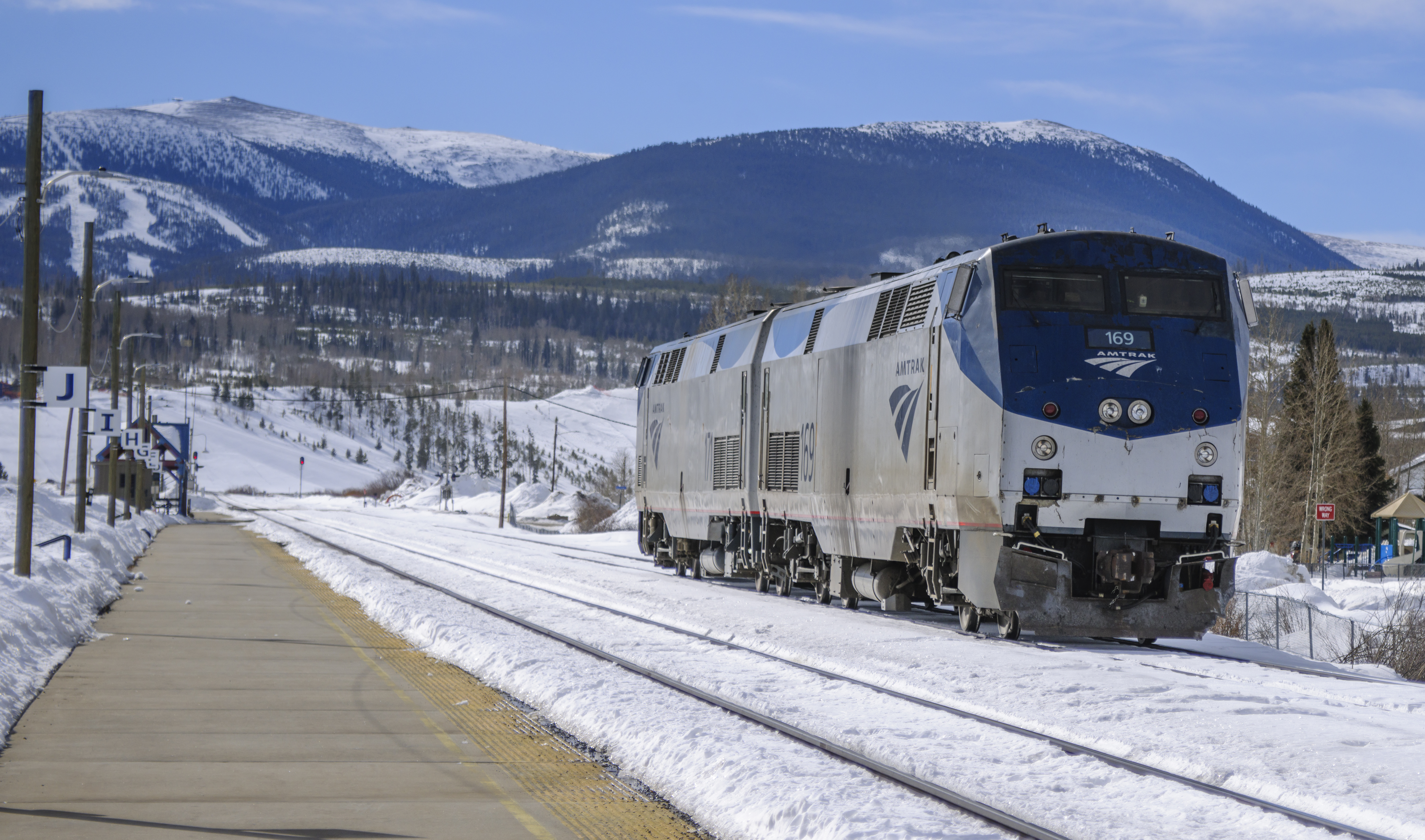
Winterpark Express Ski Train

A ski train is a passenger train which is marketed to carry passengers to ski resorts. A ski train may only operate during the winter sports season, or it may operate more frequently and have extra capacity during the winter sports season.

== Ski trains in North America ==
=== Ski trains in the United States ===
Ski trains are trains specifically used for carrying skiers from populated cities to ski areas in the United States. Most were located in northeast, going from cities such as New York City and Boston to ski areas such as Bousquet Ski Area and Chickley Alp. But when ski areas such as the latter closed in the 70s and 80s ski trains began to close. Ski Train cars were designed or converted to carry skis on the side or on the inside. Ski Trains were at the height of their popularity in the late thirties through the mid fifties.

==== Examples ====
- Amtrak Winter Park Express (2015, 2017–present), inherited from the Denver and Rio Grande Western Railroad Ski Train (1940-2009)
- Milwaukee Ski Bowl 1938–1950 (closed during several WWII years), Snoqualmie, Washington. Milwaukee Road trains (officially Chicago, Milwaukee, St. Paul, and Pacific Railroad) from Seattle and Tacoma offered recreation coaches for dancing. First night ski train.
- Sunday River Ski Train (1993–1996)
- Boston and Maine Snow Train (1931–1956, chartered 1964–1972)
- Gore Mountain Snow Train (1934–1940s and 2011–2018)
- Wachusett Mountain

=== Ski trains in Canada ===
==== Examples ====
- P'tit Train du Nord, which linked Montreal to ski hills and cross-country ski lodges in the Laurentides-region Laurentians

== Ski trains in Europe ==
Railway companies in Alpine countries operate extra trains during the winter sports season to carry skiers. These are often marketed as Ski Trains. SBB (Swiss Federal Railways) market their trains under the name 'Snow’n’Rail'.

=== Current long distance ski trains ===
- Under the name Travelski Express, a non-stop Eurostar train London - Moûtiers / Bourg Saint Maurice (French Alps) used to operate on Friday night and Saturday (daytime) during the 2021-2022 ski season as well as the 2022-2023 ski season. This train was chartered by Compagnie des Alpes and was sold only in a package with a stay.
- Bourg Saint Maurice (French Alps) also has winter-only day-time services from Amsterdam and Brussels operated by Thalys, and from Paris by SNCF.
- The Austrian Alps have winter-only ski night trains (with sleeping cars) from the Netherlands (Alpen Express / Alps-Express), Germany and other countries.
- Although operating the whole year, the Austrian operator Nightjet (ÖBB) have long distance night trains (with sleeping cars) from Amsterdam, Brussels, Hamburg (and Paris from December 2021), which in winter have a considerable amount of passengers to several winter sport destinations around Innsbruck and Vienna.

=== Other trains primarily serving skiers ===
- The Dorfbahn Serfaus carries skiers from a parking lot to the ski lift
- many mountain railways in the Swiss Alps primarily serve skiers in the winter season
