= Tribute (John Newman album) =

Studio album by John Newman
- Released: 14 October 2013
- Recorded: 2012–13
- Genres: Pop; soul; Northern soul; breakbeat
- Length: 43:56 (standard edition); 54:39 (deluxe edition)
- Labels: Universal; Island
- Producers: Ant Whiting; John Newman; Steve Booker; Mike Spencer

John Newman chronology
Tribute (2013)	Revolve (2015)

Singles from Tribute
- 1. "Love Me Again" Released: 17 May 2013; 2. "Cheating" Released: 6 October 2013; 3. "Losing Sleep" Released: 8 December 2013; 4. "Out of My Head" Released: 6 April 2014

Deluxe cover

Tribute is the debut studio album by English singer John Newman. It was released in the United Kingdom on 14 October 2013 by Universal and Island Records. The album includes the singles "Love Me Again", "Cheating", "Losing Sleep" and "Out of My Head". A deluxe edition of the album contains three bonus tracks. The album was produced by Ant Whiting, John Newman, Steve Booker and Mike Spencer. The album entered the UK Albums Chart at number one.

== Background ==
In an interview with Adam Silverstein of Digital Spy in June 2013, Newman said: "[The album]'s got everything in influences, from the orchestral, breakbeats, the hip-hop, the house music. It's pretty much a break-up album and the lyrics express that. I wanted to make sure that I crafted an album you can enjoy as a piece of art and not a Rihanna album-style thing where it's just ten singles." He was also asked if it was hard to write songs about love and break-up, he said: "No, it's the only place where I really open up to somebody, through my music. I'm producing and writing it, it's good. I like to keep a hold of everything." Talking again to Digital Spy in October 2013 about the album, he said: "I was going through a pretty bad break-up while I was making the album and I felt the title really needed to resonate. This record is a culmination of my life to this point, it's who I am and I wanted to thank everyone who has helped, supported, loved me and been an inspiration to me. I'm so proud of this album, it expresses me as a producer, as a songwriter and an artist, and I can't wait for people to hear it."

== Singles ==
"Love Me Again" was released as the lead single from the album on 17 May 2013. The song peaked at number one on the UK Singles Chart. The song was also a top 10 hit in more than ten countries including Australia, Belgium, New Zealand and Switzerland, as well as being Newman's first top 40 single in the United States.

"Cheating" was released as the second single from the album on 6 October 2013. The song peaked at number 9 on the UK Singles Chart. The song has also charted in Belgium and Ireland.

"Losing Sleep" was released as the third single from the album on 16 December 2013. It charted at number 99 in the UK Singles Chart prior to release on the week ending 14 December 2013. It has so far peaked at number 48 in the UK and number 36 in Scotland.

"Out of My Head" was released as the album's fourth single and peaked at number 91 on the UK Singles Chart.

== Critical reception ==
Professional ratings
Review scores
Source	Rating
Clash	7/10
Digital Spy	4/5 stars
The Guardian	3/5 stars
The Independent	2/5 stars
The Irish Times	3/5 stars
The Observer	3/5 stars
PopMatters	9/10
Shields Gazette	7/10
Virgin Media	3/5 stars

Tribute has received generally positive reviews from music critics. Kitty Empire of The Observer gave the album a mixed review stating, "The latest in a long line of 60s revivers, John Newman, who has had two number one singles (Rudimental's "Feel the Love", his own "Love Me Again"), lists all his inspirations on the title track of his début. They should include Plan B. You could easily subtitle this record The Reincarnation of Strickland Banks, if tracks such as "Out of My Head" weren't quite so autobiographical. On superior cuts such as "Cheating", meanwhile, this 23-year-old be-quiffed Yorkshireman looks like continuing his gilded strike rate. But where Plan B or Amy Winehouse, the doyenne of revival pop, always added an element of top spin to their tributes, Newman merely reinterprets well, rather than reinventing."

Lewis Corner of Digital Spy gave the album a positive review stating, "'It's all for you/ For what you have shown me/ And for what you do,' John Newman sings on opening track 'Tribute' from his début album of the same name. The soul singer is paying homage to a wide range of musical influences that have helped shape his sound, the list including everyone from Elvis Presley and Tina Turner to Jay Z and Adele. While his tastes are obviously eclectic, his first collection infuses these inspirations without compromising consistency. Let it be said that John Newman is neo-soul to the core – his distinctive vocal with a tinge of rasp giving him no option in the matter. That's not to say other influences don't play an important part throughout his music. 'Try' flirts with italo piano and jaunty strings which echoes '70s disco, while recent single 'Cheating' bounds around with tin-rattling break-beats from the shadows of '90s house. But while the musicality of the record dips its toe in and out of genres, the subject of love remains prominently at the forefront. Whether Newman is reflecting on the difficulties of the heart on 'Easy' or crooning for forgiveness on 'Love Me Again', Tribute thrives on a rollercoaster narrative of broken relationships, gutsy emotions and broody intent. What's more, the collection doesn't suffer from burn-out towards the finish. 'Running' is a pulsing mid-tempo with a strong whiff of Emeli Sandé to it, while 'Goodnight Goodbye' soars with a lofty chorus that is primed for an impressive live outing. The list of influences for John Newman's début may be long, but rather than emulating his idols, he is in fact following in their footsteps – and Tribute gets him off to a very strong start."

Andy Gill of The Independent gave the album a mixed review, stating, Rudimental's "Feel the Love" proclaimed John Newman as a powerful new voice in UK R&B, an impression reinforced by his chart-topper "Love Me Again". But he's keen to demonstrate how much deeper his influences go, introducing this album with a litany of soul singers' names leading into "Tribute", his smoky timbre borne on exultant strings that also allude to a classic-soul era. It's impressive stuff, though as early as the third or fourth track, the formula of impassioned smouldering leading to hugely telegraphed refrains is getting a little predictable. Variety is furnished by the desolate plaint of "Out of My Head" and the gospelly backing vocals of "Running", also the source of the album's best line: "Trying to stop a river when it wants to rise."

== Commercial performance ==
On 17 October 2013, the album entered the Irish Albums Chart at number 8. On 19 October 2013, the album entered the Dutch Albums Chart at number 51. On 20 October 2013, the album entered the UK Albums Chart and Scottish Albums Chart at number one. The album débuted at number 7 on the Australian Albums Chart. The album débuted at number 6 on the New Zealand Albums Chart. The album has also peaked to number 20 in Austria, number 33 in Belgium, number 18 in Denmark, number 37 in France, number 21 in Germany, number 6 in Hungary, number 28 in Italy, number 12 in Norway, number 30 in Spain and number 11 in Switzerland.

== Track listing ==
Standard edition
No.	Title	Writer(s)	Producer(s)	Length
1.	"Tribute"	John Newman; Ant Whiting	Whiting; Newman	5:38
2.	"Love Me Again"	Newman; Steve Booker	Booker; Mike Spencer	4:00
3.	"Losing Sleep"	Newman; Booker; Benny Blanco	Whiting; Newman; Spencer	4:42
4.	"Easy"	Newman; Booker	Whiting; Newman	3:40
5.	"Try"	Newman; Booker	Whiting; Newman	3:35
6.	"Out of My Head"	Newman; Booker	Whiting; Newman	3:50
7.	"Cheating"	Newman; Emily Phillips	Whiting; Newman; Spencer	3:42
8.	"Running"	Newman; Steve Mac; Wayne Hector	Whiting; Newman	4:20
9.	"Gold Dust"	Newman; Tim Woodcock	Whiting; Newman	3:32
10.	"Goodnight Goodbye"	Newman; Booker	Whiting; Newman	3:43
11.	"All I Need Is You"	Newman; Booker	Whiting; Newman	3:22
Total length:				43:56

Deluxe edition
No.	Title	Writer(s)	Producer(s)	Length
12.	"Down the Line"	Newman; Mac; Hector	Whiting; Newman	3:55
13.	"Nothing"	Newman; Martin Brammer; Steve Robson	Whiting; Newman	3:33
14.	"Day One"	Newman; Nick Hodgson; Richard Wilkinson	Whiting; Newman	3:17
Total length:				54:39

== Charts ==
=== Weekly charts ===
Chart (2013)	Peak position
Australian Albums (ARIA)	7
Austrian Albums (Ö3 Austria)	20
Belgian Albums (Ultratop Flanders)	33
Belgian Albums (Ultratop Wallonia)	48
Danish Albums (Hitlisten)	18
Dutch Albums (Album Top 100)	51
French Albums (SNEP)	37
German Albums (Offizielle Top 100)	21
Hungarian Albums (MAHASZ)	6
Irish Albums (IRMA)	8
Italian Albums (FIMI)	28
New Zealand Albums (RMNZ)	6
Norwegian Albums (VG-lista)	12
Polish Albums (ZPAV)	31
Portuguese Albums (AFP)	24
Scottish Albums (Official Charts)	1
Spanish Albums (Promusicae)	30
Swedish Albums (Sverigetopplistan)	54
Swiss Albums (Schweizer Hitparade)	11
UK Albums (Official Charts)	1
UK Album Downloads (Official Charts)	1
US Billboard 200	24

=== Year-end charts ===
Chart (2013)	Position
UK Albums (OCC)	56
Chart (2014)	Position
UK Albums (OCC)	45

== Certifications ==
Region	Certification	Certified units/sales
Austria (IFPI Austria)	Gold	7,500^{*}
New Zealand (RMNZ)	Platinum	15,000^{‡}
Poland (ZPAV)	Gold	10,000^{*}
Switzerland (IFPI Switzerland)	Gold	10,000^{^}
United Kingdom (BPI)	Platinum	312,993
^{*} Sales figures based on certification alone.^{^} Shipments figures based on certification alone.

== Release history ==
Region	Date	Format	Label
Australia	11 October 2013	CD; digital download	Universal; Island
Austria	11 October 2013	CD; digital download	Universal; Island
Belgium	11 October 2013	CD; digital download	Universal; Island
Germany	11 October 2013	CD; digital download	Universal; Island
Ireland	11 October 2013	CD; digital download	Universal; Island
Netherlands	11 October 2013	CD; digital download	Universal; Island
New Zealand	11 October 2013	CD; digital download	Universal; Island
Switzerland	11 October 2013	CD; digital download	Universal; Island
United Kingdom	14 October 2013	CD; digital download	Universal; Island
United States	7 January 2014	CD; digital download	Universal; Island
