= Love Me Again (John Newman song) =

Single by John Newman

from the album Tribute
- B-side: "Remixes"
- Released: 17 May 2013
- Recorded: June 2012
- Genre: Northern soul; dance-pop; breakbeat
- Length: 4:00 (album version); 3:36 (radio edit)
- Label: Island; Republic
- Songwriters: Steve Booker; John Newman
- Producers: Steve Booker; Mike Spencer

John Newman singles chronology
"Not Giving In" (2012)	"Love Me Again" (2013)	"Cheating" (2013)

Music video
- "Love Me Again" on YouTube

"Love Me Again" is the debut solo single by English singer and DJ John Newman. The song was released as a digital download in Europe on 17 May 2013, except for the United Kingdom where it was released on 30 June 2013 as the lead single from his debut studio album, Tribute (2013). The song was written by Newman and Steve Booker and produced by Booker and Mike Spencer. The song was later featured on the soundtrack for Tosh.O, the video game FIFA 14 and the FIFA 23 extension for the 2022 FIFA World Cup.

It was nominated for the Brit Award for British Single of the Year at the 2014 BRIT Awards and nominated for the 2014 Ivor Novello Award for Best Song Musically and Lyrically.

In 2026, Newman returned to make a sequel to the song titled "Love Me Again (Again)".

== Background ==
In an interview with Digital Spy, Newman was asked if he sensed that the song had something special about it in the studio. He said, "Yeah. The guy I wrote it with (Steve Booker), we turned around and had massive grins on our faces thinking, 'There's something good here'. But you just never know how good it is, you know?".

Newman was also asked if it was hard to write the lyrics about love and break-up, he said, "No, it's the only place where I really open up to somebody, through my music. I'm producing [the album] and writing it, it's good. I like to keep a hold of everything".

With the chord progression of Gm—Bb—Dm—C, the song is written in the key of G Dorian. The key signature is in D minor. Both are modes of F major, of which either one can be used as the tonic note/chord, because, however, the F major chord is not present in the song.

== Music video ==
Two music videos, both with elements of Northern soul dancing, have been released for "Love Me Again". One version directed by Vaughan Arnell is based on the classic love story of Romeo and Juliet. The woman in the video, Juliet, is French actress Margaux Billard, carefully watched over by her brother, Tybalt, played by Joseph Steyne. Romeo is played by British model Tommy-Lee Winkworth. This video ends in a cliffhanger as the couple are run over by a truck, with their fate remaining unknown till Newman's follow-up single "Cheating", which starts with a newspaper article indicating that the couple had indeed survived the crash.

Another version features Newman, backed by musicians, singing in a dimly lit room.

== Accolades ==
Publication	Accolade	Rank
PopMatters	The 75 Best Songs of 2013	2

== In popular culture ==
"Love Me Again" was featured on the soundtrack of the video game FIFA 14, giving it cult status among FIFA fans, as well as the Federation's #WorldCupAtHome series, which opened FIFA's archive during the COVID-19 pandemic. A shortened version also appeared in the closing credits of the 2014 science fiction film, Edge of Tomorrow, starring Tom Cruise and Emily Blunt. The song was also featured on the American TV series, Suits in the episode, "Buried Secrets", which aired on 6 March 2014, and in the opening scenes of the first episode of season 4, "One-Two-Three Go", which aired 11 June 2014. "Love Me Again" is also a playable song in Just Dance 2015 and is set to be added to the franchise's streaming service. The song was also used as the theme to the television show Whiskey Cavalier which debuted in February 2019 and ended in May after one season. In August 2020 and May 2021 it was used in TV and radio adverts for National Rail.

The French channel TF6 also used this song to shut down its channel.

== Remixes and cover versions ==
The song was remixed by the electronic DJ Kove. John produced several new versions of the song, which he also performed live.

A VIP remix, titled "Love Me Again (Again)", was released on January 30, 2026.

== Track listing ==
Digital download
No.	Title	Length
1.	"Love Me Again"	4:00
2.	"Love Me Again" (Kove remix)	4:20
3.	"Love Me Again" (Gemini remix)	4:02
4.	"Love Me Again" (Ejeca remix)	6:52
5.	"Love Me Again" (Love Thy Brother remix)	4:26

Max Sanna and Steve Pitron remix
No.	Title	Length
1.	"Love Me Again" (Max Sanna and Steve Pitron remix)	3:43

== Personnel ==
- Lead vocals – John Newman
- Producers – Steve Booker and Mike Spencer
- Lyrics – John Newman and Steve Booker
- Label: Universal, Island
- Recording software – Apple Logic Pro

== Charts ==
=== Weekly charts ===
Weekly chart performance
Chart (2013–2014)	Peak position
Australia (ARIA)	4
Australia Digital Song Sales (Billboard)	3
Austria (Ö3 Austria Top 40)	5
Belgium (Ultratop 50 Flanders)	6
Belgium (Ultratop 50 Wallonia)	8
Bulgaria Airplay (BAMP)	2
Canada Hot 100 (Billboard)	18
CIS Airplay (TopHit)	2
Czech Republic Airplay (ČNS IFPI)	2
Czech Republic Singles Digital (ČNS IFPI)	15
Denmark (Tracklisten)	9
Euro Digital Song Sales (Billboard)	2
France (SNEP)	7
Germany (GfK)	6
Greece Airplay (IFPI)	1
Hungary (Dance Top 40)	12
Hungary (Rádiós Top 40)	3
Hungary (Single Top 40)	5
Ireland (IRMA)	3
Israel International Airplay (Media Forest)	3
Italy (FIMI)	3
Lebanon (Lebanese Top 20)	17
Luxembourg Digital Song Sales (Billboard)	4
Mexico Airplay (Billboard)	25
Netherlands (Dutch Top 40)	14
Netherlands (Single Top 100)	19
New Zealand (Recorded Music NZ)	9
Norway (VG-lista)	9
Poland Airplay (ZPAV)	2
Portugal Digital Song Sales (Billboard)	3
Russia Airplay (TopHit)	2
Scottish Singles Sales (Official Charts)	1
Slovakia Airplay (ČNS IFPI)	7
Slovenia Airplay (SloTop50)	4
Spain (Promusicae)	4
Sweden (Sverigetopplistan)	34
Switzerland (Schweizer Hitparade)	5
Switzerland Digital Song Sales (Billboard)	4
UK Singles (Official Charts)	1
Ukraine Airplay (TopHit)	3
US Billboard Hot 100	30
US Adult Pop Airplay (Billboard)	13
US Dance Club Songs (Billboard)	15
US Pop Airplay (Billboard)	13
Venezuela Pop Rock Airplay (Record Report)	22

2019–2026 weekly chart performance
Chart (2019–2026)	Peak position
CIS Airplay (TopHit)	158
Estonia Airplay (TopHit)	167
Kazakhstan Airplay (TopHit)	82
Romania Airplay (TopHit)	188
Russia Airplay (TopHit)	198
Ukraine Airplay (TopHit)	60

=== Year-end charts ===
2013 year-end chart performance for "Love Me Again"
Chart (2013)	Position
Australia (ARIA)	46
Austria (Ö3 Austria Top 40)	43
Belgium (Ultratop Flanders)	30
Belgium (Ultratop Wallonia)	58
France (SNEP)	35
Germany (Media Control AG)	28
Hungary (Dance Top 40)	37
Hungary (Rádiós Top 40)	4
Italy (FIMI)	18
Netherlands (Dutch Top 40)	59
Netherlands (Single Top 100)	51
Russia Airplay (TopHit)	29
Slovenia (SloTop50)	7
Spain (PROMUSICAE)	37
Switzerland (Schweizer Hitparade)	27
Ukraine Airplay (TopHit)	51
UK Singles (Official Charts Company)	14

2014 year-end chart performance for "Love Me Again"
Chart (2014)	Position
Canada (Canadian Hot 100)	73
Hungary (Dance Top 40)	43
Hungary (Single Top 40)	91
Russia Airplay (TopHit)	68
Ukraine Airplay (TopHit)	83

== Certifications ==
Certifications and sales for "Love Me Again"
Region	Certification	Certified units/sales
Australia (ARIA)	3× Platinum	210,000^{‡}
Belgium (BRMA)	Gold	15,000^{*}
Brazil (Pro-Música Brasil)	Diamond	250,000^{‡}
Germany (BVMI)	Platinum	300,000^{‡}
Italy (FIMI)	2× Platinum	60,000^{‡}
New Zealand (RMNZ)	3× Platinum	90,000^{‡}
Spain (Promusicae)	Platinum	60,000^{‡}
Sweden (GLF)	2× Platinum	80,000^{‡}
Switzerland (IFPI Switzerland)	Platinum	30,000^{^}
United Kingdom (BPI)	3× Platinum	1,800,000^{‡}
United States (RIAA)	Platinum	1,000,000^{‡}
Streaming
Denmark (IFPI Danmark)	2× Platinum	3,600,000^{†}
Spain (Promusicae)	Gold	4,000,000^{†}
^{*} Sales figures based on certification alone.^{^} Shipments figures based on certification alone.^{‡} Sales+streaming figures based on certification alone.^{†} Streaming-only figures based on certification alone.

== Release history ==
Region	Date	Format	Label
Spain	17 May 2013	Digital download	Island
Worldwide	30 June 2013	Digital download	Island
United States	30 June 2013	Digital download	Republic
