= Silver Bullet Express =

Overview
- Service type: Commuter /Heritage Rail
- Locale: Southwestern Maine
- First service: December 26, 1993
- Last service: Spring 1997
- Former operators: St. Lawrence and Atlantic Railroad, Sunday River Ski Resort under Les Otten

Route
- Distance travelled: 67 miles (108 km)
- Service frequency: M, W, F, Sat, Sun: One daily round trip

Technical
- Track gauge: 4 ft 8 1/2 in (1,435 mm)
- Track owner: St. Lawrence and Atlantic Railroad

The Silver Bullet Express, also known as the Sunday River Ski Train, was a privately owned and operated ski train that ran from Portland, Maine, to Sunday River Ski Resort near Bethel, Maine. The ski train was owned by Sunday River and sponsored by Coors Light. The train left Portland at 6:45 am, arriving in Bethel at 8:45 am, at which point passengers transferred to buses which would take them to the mountain. The return trip would depart Bethel at 5:15 pm. Amenities included a dining car, parlor car, and a retrofitted boxcar for carrying skis and snowboards. It operated from 1993 until 1996.

== History ==
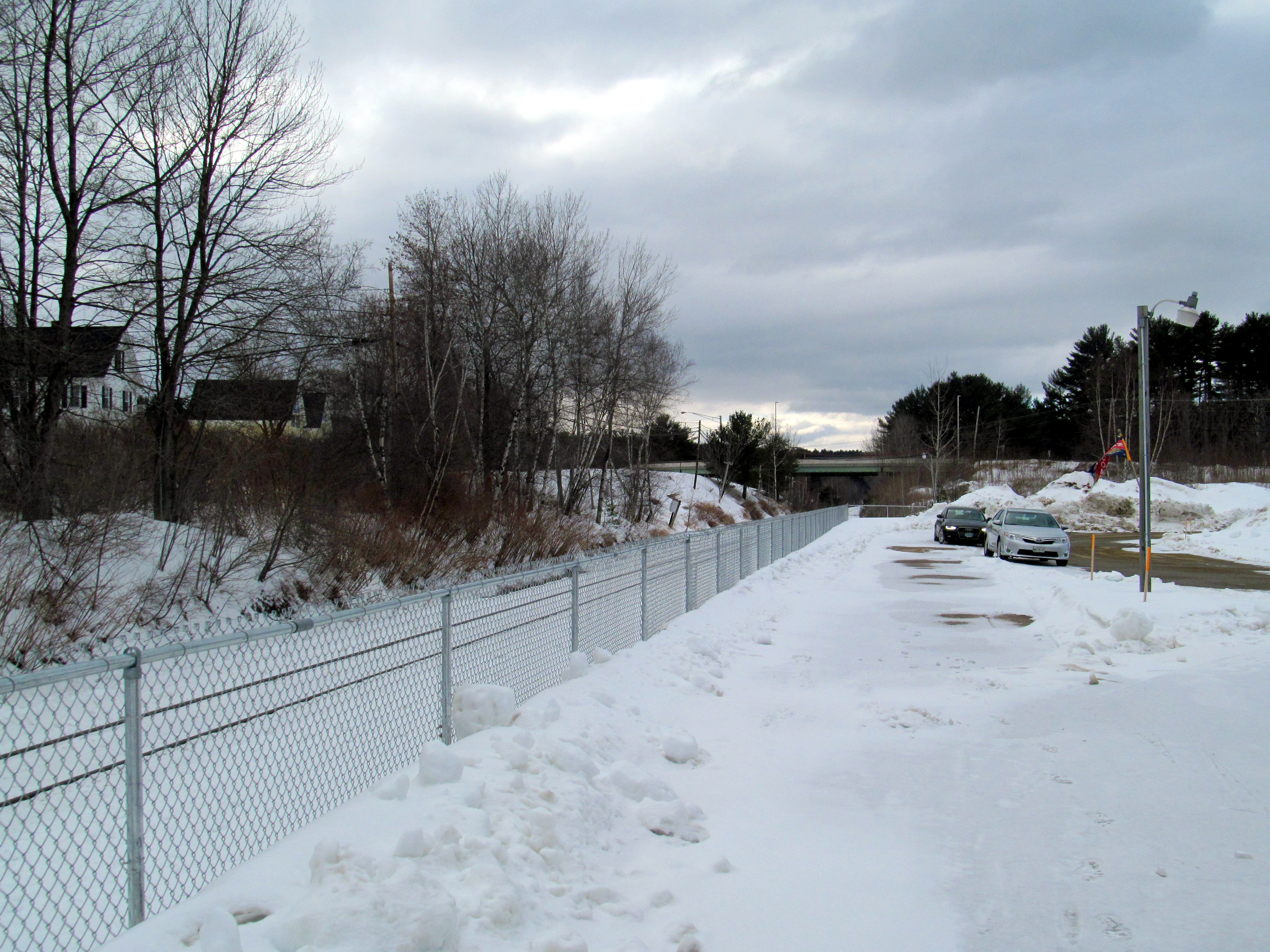
The high-level platform at Bethel, used for the Silver Bullet Express from 1993 to 1997

In 1993, Les Otten who owned Sunday River envisioned a ski train that would connect the mountain with Auburn, Portland and Boston (through a Portland to Boston passenger rail line that never materialized until 2001 in the form of the Amtrak Downeaster). Otten appointed Carl Spangler to head the ski train effort. That summer a set of seven heritage cars was purchased from Indiana Rail Road, and the St. Lawrence and Atlantic Railroad was hired to operate the train. Buses were also purchased from Chicago Transit Authority to carry skiers from the station in Bethel to the mountain.
