= Come and Get It (John Newman song) =

Single by John Newman

from the album Revolve
- Released: 17 July 2015
- Recorded: 2015
- Genre: Soul; pop; funk
- Length: 3:04
- Label: Island
- Songwriters: John Newman; Greg Kurstin
- Producers: John Newman; Greg Kurstin

John Newman singles chronology
"Blame" (2014)	"Come and Get It" (2015)	"Tiring Game" (2015)

"Come and Get It" is a song by English singer John Newman. The song was released on 17 July 2015 as the lead single from his second studio album, Revolve (2015). A music video was commissioned for it to promote the song. The song was written and produced by Newman and Greg Kurstin. It has received positive critical reception and was also featured on the soundtrack for the video game Madden NFL 16.

== Background ==
Newman wrote the song with the intention of writing something to enjoy in the car, and took inspiration from the sun. It is the lead single from his second studio album Revolve. It premiered on Capital FM.

== Critical reception ==
Brice Ezell of PopMatters commended the song for containing a "positively huge" chorus that was "catchy in a near undeniable way", while Alexander Bradley of Gigsandfestivals.com called it "upbeat and infectious". Tarynn Law of The 405 commended the song's blend of "soul, funk, and gritty, blues-esque lyrical delivery is welcomed", while Natalie Harmsen noted its "upbeat jangly swing accompanied by a funky melody that adds a Pharrell-esque twist".

== Music video ==
A music video was commissioned for the song. It features Newman and starts off black and white before becoming full colour. It features him driving himself and a girl into the sunset. The idea of the video was created by Newman, who explained that he wrote the script for the video while in Los Angeles, and that it was originally intended for another song. Initially, two videos were created – one a prequel to the other – however only one of them was used after "Come and Get It" was selected as the new single. The video was directed by Alex Heron, the only one of Newman's producers who believed that the idea would work. It is based upon an event that happened in Newman's life.

== Track listing ==
Digital download – single
No.	Title	Length
1.	"Come and Get It"	3:04

Digital download – remixes
No.	Title	Length
1.	"Come and Get It" (Tobtok Remix)	4:22
2.	"Come and Get It" (Kideko Remix)	4:51

== Charts and certifications ==
=== Charts ===
Chart (2015)	Peak position
Austria (Ö3 Austria Top 40)	43
Belgium (Ultratip Bubbling Under Flanders)	3
Belgium (Ultratip Bubbling Under Wallonia)	9
Czech Republic Airplay (ČNS IFPI)	11
Hungary (Rádiós Top 40)	23
Hungary (Single Top 40)	14
Iceland (RÚV)	12
Ireland (IRMA)	53
Mexico Ingles Airplay (Billboard)	1
Netherlands (Single Top 100)	69
Netherlands (Dutch Top 40)	28
Poland Airplay (ZPAV)	10
Poland (Polish Airplay New)	1
Scotland Singles (Official Charts)	3
Slovakia Airplay (ČNS IFPI)	27
Slovenia (SloTop50)	7
Spain (Promusicae)	19
Switzerland (Schweizer Hitparade)	29
UK Singles (Official Charts)	5
UK Singles Downloads (Official Charts)	2

=== Year-end charts ===
Chart (2015)	Position
Hungary (Single Top 40)	93

=== Certifications ===
Region	Certification	Certified units/sales
United Kingdom (BPI)	Silver	200,000^{‡}
^{‡} Sales+streaming figures based on certification alone.

== Release history ==
Region	Date	Format	Label
United Kingdom	17 July 2015	Digital download	Island
