= High on You (Sigma and John Newman song) =

Single by Sigma and John Newman

from the album Hope
- Released: 12 June 2020
- Length: 3:59
- Label: 3 Beat
- Songwriters: Christopher Tempest; George Henry Tizzard; John Newman; Rick Parkhouse; Sam Preston
- Producer: Joe Lenzie

Sigma singles chronology
"Rest of My Life" (2020)	"High on You" (2020)	"Fire in Your Eyez" (2020)

John Newman singles chronology
"Stand by Me" (2020)	"High on You" (2020)	"If You Really Love Me (How Will I Know)" (2021)

Music video
- "High on You" on YouTube

"High on You" is a song by British drum and bass DJ and record production duo Sigma and English singer John Newman. The song was released as a digital download on 12 June 2020 by 3 Beat Records as the eighth single from the duo's second studio album, Hope. The song was written by Christopher Tempest, George Henry Tizzard, John Newman, Rick Parkhouse and Sam Preston.

== Music video ==
A music video to accompany the release of "High on You" was first released onto YouTube on 26 June 2020. The video shows two single neighbours on quarantine during the COVID-19 pandemic entering a "socially distanced" relationship. Talking about the video, Sigma said, "It was really hard to get a video done in the lockdown period, but we knew that we wanted to do one which reflected the frustrations of this horrible time we are going through [...] it's very tongue in cheek."

== Track listing ==
Digital download
No.	Title	Length
1.	"High on You"	3:59

Digital download – Sigma VIP version
No.	Title	Length
1.	"High on You" (Sigma VIP)	3:28

== Personnel ==
Credits adapted from Tidal.

- Joe Lenzie – producer, associated performer, music production
- Christopher Tempest – composer, lyricist
- George Henry Tizzard – composer, lyricist
- John Newman – composer, lyricist, associated performer, vocals
- Rick Parkhouse – composer, lyricist
- Sam Preston – composer, lyricist
- Stuart Hawkes – mastering engineer, studio personnel
- Mark Ralph – mixer, studio personnel

== Charts ==
Chart (2020)	Peak position
Czech Republic Airplay (ČNS IFPI)	16

== Release history ==
Region	Date	Format	Version	Label
United Kingdom	12 June 2020	Digital download; streaming	Original	3 Beat
United Kingdom	23 June 2020	Digital download; streaming	Sigma VIP	3 Beat
