= Cheating (song) =

Single by John Newman

from the album Tribute
- Released: 6 October 2013
- Recorded: 2012–13
- Genre: Pop; breakbeat; soul
- Length: 3:42
- Label: Island
- Songwriters: John Newman; Emily Phillips
- Producers: Ant Whiting; John Newman; Mike Spencer

John Newman singles chronology
"Love Me Again" (2013)	"Cheating" (2013)	"Losing Sleep" (2013)

"Cheating" is a song by English singer John Newman. The song was released on 6 October 2013 as the second single from his debut studio album, Tribute (2013). The song was written by John Newman and Emily Phillips. The song peaked at number 9 on the UK Singles Chart.

This song has been modified with different lyrics on the 2014 Toyota Yaris commercial in Indonesia.

== Music video ==
A music video to accompany the release of "Cheating" was first released onto YouTube on 22 August 2013 at a total length of three minutes and forty-one seconds. The video shows Newman invoking guilt in a cheating lover by performing the song on a nearby rooftop. The video also starts with a shot of a newspaper, referencing to Newman's earlier music video, "Love Me Again", which had ended with the two main characters encountering a car crash. The newspaper's headline read, "Couple survives Hit-and-Run".

== Critical reception ==
Lewis Corner of Digital Spy gave the song a positive review stating:

Despite already having two chart-toppers to his name, John Newman recently told us that he "constantly wants more". It's a necessary determination to have in today's cut-throat music industry and is made slightly easier when there's plenty of talent to back it up with. The last we heard from the Yorkshire crooner he was asking his beau for forgiveness over perky brass and rattling breakbeats, but the tables have seemingly turned on his latest offering. "But if you're cheating, cheat on, yeah/ 'Cause cheating's just the thing you do," Newman coolly notes over spry horns and Italo piano lines, before the sass levels are elevated by a soulful gospel choir by the song's end. It's a classy retaliation to his Shakespearean-styled cuckolding that reinforces his dominance of UK neo soul. And as for wanting that third number one? With this little anthem in his repertoire, we can't see that being too much of a problem.

== Track listing ==
Digital download
No.	Title	Length
1.	"Cheating"	3:42

Digital download – Remix (EP)
No.	Title	Length
1.	"Cheating" (Freemasons Club Edit)	7:57
2.	"Cheating" (DJ Zinc Remix)	4:29
3.	"Cheating" (Wookie Remix)	5:04
4.	"Cheating" (Wayward Remix)	5:34
5.	"Cheating" (William Carl Jr Remix)	4:46

== Credits and personnel ==
- Lead vocals – John Newman
- Lyrics – John Newman and Emily Phillips
- Producers – Ant Whiting, John Newman and Mike Spencer
- Label – Island

== Charts ==
=== Weekly charts ===
Weekly chart performance
Chart (2013–14)	Peak position
Austria (Ö3 Austria Top 40)	44
Belgium (Ultratip Bubbling Under Flanders)	4
Belgium (Ultratip Bubbling Under Wallonia)	3
Finland Airplay (Radiosoittolista)	60
Germany (GfK)	53
Hungary (Rádiós Top 40)	2
Hungary (Single Top 40)	14
Hungary (Stream Top 40)	6
Iceland (RÚV)	24
Ireland (IRMA)	19
Poland Airplay (ZPAV)	8
Poland Dance (ZPAV)	37
Scottish Singles Sales (Official Charts)	7
Slovakia Airplay (ČNS IFPI)	72
Slovenia (SloTop50)	36
Switzerland (Schweizer Hitparade)	56
UK Singles (Official Charts)	9

=== Year-end charts ===
Annual chart rankings
Chart (2013)	Position
Hungary (Rádiós Top 40)	26
Chart (2014)	Position
Hungary (Rádiós Top 40)	88

== Release history ==
Street dates
Region	Date	Format	Label
United Kingdom	6 October 2013	Digital download	Island
