= Revolve (John Newman album) =

Studio album by John Newman
- Released: 16 October 2015
- Recorded: 2014–15
- Genre: Soul; pop; funk
- Length: 37:25
- Label: Universal; Island
- Producer: John Newman; Greg Kurstin; Jack Splash; Calvin Harris (deluxe ed.)

John Newman chronology
Tribute (2013)	Revolve (2015)	A.N.i.M.A.L (2019)

Singles from Revolve
- 1. "Come and Get It" Released: 17 July 2015; 2. "Tiring Game" Released: 26 August 2015

Revolve is the second studio album by English singer John Newman. It was released on 16 October 2015 by Universal and Island Records. The album includes the singles "Come and Get It" and "Tiring Game". It is the follow-up to his 2013 debut Tribute (2013).

== Singles ==
"Come and Get It" was released as the album's first single on 17 July 2015. It peaked at number 5 on the UK Singles Chart.

"Tiring Game" was released as the second single on 26 August 2015 and has peaked at number 134 on the UK Singles Chart. The song features vocals from American singer Charlie Wilson.

=== Other songs ===
Calvin Harris' song "Blame" features Newman and appears on the deluxe edition of the album. It was released as a single from Harris' album Motion on 5 September 2014. The song reached number one on the UK Singles Chart.

== Critical reception ==
Andy Kellman of AllMusic wrote in his 3 and a half star review "Released almost exactly two years after the UK chart topping and platinum selling Tribute, Revolve more closely follows Calvin Harris' equally successful "Blame" on which John Newman provided a typically full-throttle vocal and somewhat contradictory lines like "Guilt is burning" and "Don't blame it on me". Although Newman made this album with a new set of collaborators, including fellow producer/songwriters Greg Kurstin and Jack Splash, its foundation is likewise in muscular retro soul that blares and bolts and manages to keep up with the singer's superhuman level of energy. There are lighter diversions into house and disco including "Tiring Game," featuring Charlie Wilson, and Newman dials it down every now and then for ballads, but Revolve is very much in line with the winning formula of Tribute. Its wider emotional range and stylistic switch ups, none of which is outside Newman's grasp give it a slight edge."

== Track listing ==
Revolve – Standard version
No.	Title	Writer(s)	Producer(s)	Length
1.	"Revolve" (featuring Idris Elba)	John Newman; Tom Willers	Newman	1:39
2.	"All My Heart"	Newman	Newman	3:00
3.	"Something Special"	Newman	Newman	3:34
4.	"Lights Down"	Newman; Greg Kurstin	Kurstin; Newman	4:11
5.	"Come and Get It"	Newman; Kurstin	Kurstin; Newman	3:04
6.	"Never Give It Up"	Newman; Kurstin	Kurstin; Newman	3:14
7.	"Tiring Game" (featuring Charlie Wilson)	Newman; Charlie Wilson	Jack Splash; Newman; Kurstin	3:23
8.	"Give You My Love"	Newman; Willers; Carlos Garcia-Valencia	Splash; Newman	3:50
9.	"I'm Not Your Man"	Newman; Toby Gad	Newman	3:13
10.	"Killing Me"	Newman; Kurstin	Kurstin; Newman	3:22
11.	"We All Get Lonely"	Newman; Splash	Splash; Newman	4:55

Revolve – The Deluxe edition
No.	Title	Writer(s)	Producer(s)	Length
1.	"Revolve" (featuring Idris Elba)	Newman; Willers	Newman	1:39
2.	"All My Heart"	Newman	Newman	3:00
3.	"Something Special"	Newman	Newman	3:34
4.	"Lights Down"	Newman; Kurstin	Kurstin; Newman	4:11
5.	"Come and Get It"	Newman; Kurstin	Kurstin; Newman	3:04
6.	"Blame" (Calvin Harris featuring John Newman)	Calvin Harris; Newman; James Newman	Calvin Harris	3:30
7.	"Never Give It Up"	Newman; Kurstin	Kurstin; Newman	3:14
8.	"Tiring Game" (featuring Charlie Wilson)	Newman; Wilson	Splash; Newman; Kurstin	3:23
9.	"Give You My Love"	Newman; Willers; Garcia-Valencia	Splash; Newman	3:50
10.	"I'm Not Your Man"	Newman; Gad	Newman	3:13
11.	"Called It Off"	Newman; Gad	Splash; Newman	3:38
12.	"Killing Me"	Newman; Kurstin	Kurstin; Newman	3:22
13.	"The Past"	Newman	Newman	4:48
14.	"We All Get Lonely"	Newman; Splash	Splash; Newman	4:55

Notes

- Credits adapted from album liner notes.

== Charts ==
Chart (2015)	Peak position
Australian Albums (ARIA)	94
Belgian Albums (Ultratop Flanders)	61
Belgian Albums (Ultratop Wallonia)	129
Dutch Albums (Album Top 100)	37
Irish Albums (IRMA)	67
Scottish Albums (OCC)	3
Spanish Albums (Promusicae)	71
Swiss Albums (Schweizer Hitparade)	29
UK Albums (OCC)	3
UK Album Downloads (OCC)	8

== Release history ==
Region	Date	Format	Label
Worldwide	16 October 2015	CD; digital download	Universal; Island
