= The Silver Bullet =

Coordinates: 51.5646°N 0.1054°W

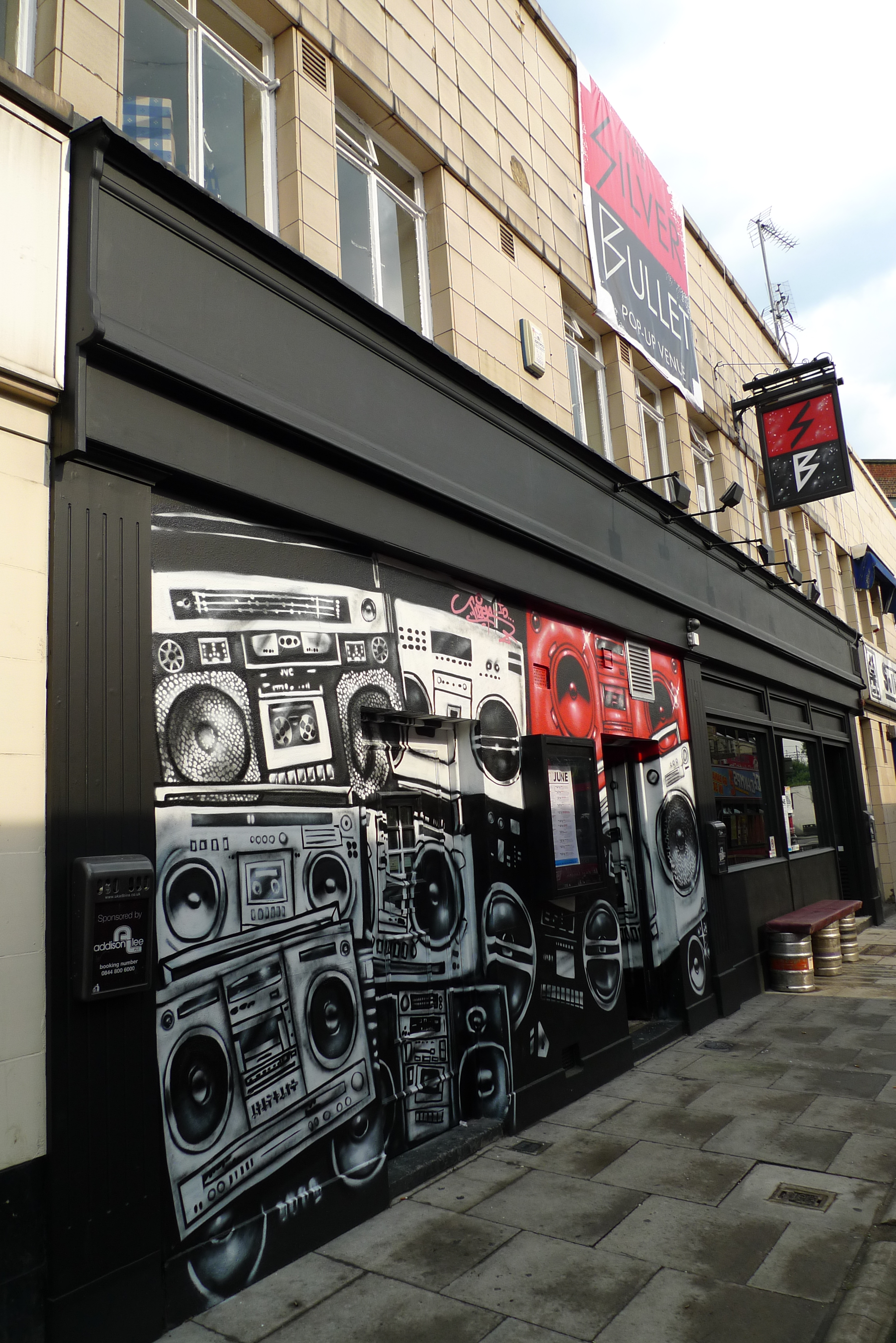
- Interactive map of The Silver Bullet
- Location: Finsbury Park; London, N4; United Kingdom
- Owner: Matthew Selwyn / Tom Allerton
- Capacity: 200
- Public transit: Finsbury Park

Construction
- Opened: 2010
- Closed: June 2016

Website
- thesilverbullet.co.uk

The Silver Bullet was an independent live music venue in Finsbury Park, London, regularly hosting live music and DJ acts until it closed in June 2016.

== 1930s to 2010 ==
The Silver Bullet pub opened opposite Finsbury Park station in the 1930s and took its name from the Silver Bullet train that used to pass through the station. The pub name was changed to The Gaslight, but it reverted to its original name The Silver Bullet in May 2010 when it was converted into a live music venue.

== 2010 - pop-up live music venue ==
The Gaslight was taken over by new owners in February 2010. After closing for refurbishments it re-opened on 27 May 2010 as a pop-up live music venue called The Silver Bullet, as the new owners were only granted a one-year lease. During its pop-up phase there were live performances from the Cuban Brothers, Totally Enormous Extinct Dinosaurs, Puressence and Slow Club and DJ sets from The Maccabees, Eddy Temple-Morris, Mystery Jets and Eddie Piller. Due to popular demand in the area for such a venue, a 20-year lease extension was granted in October 2010 and the venue was able to stay open on a permanent basis.

== 2011-2016 ==
The venue hosted weekly events, Sunday to Wednesday, including a Blues Jam on Mondays and a weekly Jazz Jam hosted by Bukky Leo on Tuesdays. Featured weekend events covered diverse genres of music, including Reggae, Northern Soul, Hip hop, Grunge, House music and Electronica. During this period The Silver Bullet also hosted live performances from many acts including Laura Marling, John Newman, Electric Pyramid, Mad Professor, James Walsh, Funkdoobiest, Lords of the Underground, and Jeru The Damaja. There were also DJ Sets from Rudimental, The Herbaliser, Don Letts, Paul Hartnoll of Orbital, DJ Derek and Fabio.

The venue closed in June 2016, with the site reopening in October 2016 as Zelman Drinks. A venue called The Night Owl was established on the premises in 2021.
