= FIFA 14 =

2013 association football video game

- European old-gen cover art featuring Barcelona's Lionel Messi
- Developers: EA Canada; EA Romania (3DS, mobile)
- Publisher: EA Sports
- Producers: Kaz Makita; David Rutter; Paul Hossack; Sebastian Enrique
- Designer: Simon Humber
- Series: FIFA
- Engine: Ignite (PS4, XOne)
- Platforms: Microsoft Windows Consoles: PlayStation 2 PlayStation 3 PlayStation 4 Xbox 360 Xbox One Wii; Handheld: PlayStation Portable PlayStation Vita Nintendo 3DS; Mobile: iOS Android Windows Phone 8
- Release: 24 September 2013: iOS, Android; WW: 24 September 2013 PlayStation 3, PlayStation Portable, PlayStation Vita, Xbox 360, Wii, Nintendo 3DS, Windows; NA: 24 September 2013; AU: 26 September 2013; EU: 27 September 2013 PlayStation 2; NA: 24 September 2013; EU: 27 September 2013 PlayStation 4; NA: 12 November 2013; AU: 28 November 2013; EU: 29 November 2013 Xbox One; NA: 19 November 2013; PAL: 21 November 2013 Windows Phone 8; WW: 28 February 2014
- Genre: Sports
- Modes: Single-player, multiplayer

FIFA 14 is a football simulation video game developed by EA Canada and published by Electronic Arts worldwide under the EA Sports label. It was released in September 2013 for the PlayStation 2, PlayStation 3, PlayStation Portable, PlayStation Vita, Xbox 360, Wii, Nintendo 3DS and Windows. It was released as a freemium, under the title FIFA 14 Mobile, for iOS and Android on 23 September 2013 and for Windows Phone 8 on 28 February 2014, although much of the game is inaccessible without an in-app payment. It was a launch title for both the PlayStation 4 and Xbox One in November 2013. The PlayStation 2 version was only released in PAL territories and Spanish-speaking markets, and was the last game released for the system in the Americas. The PlayStation Portable version was only released as a digital download in North America.

The game received primarily positive reviews across all systems.

== Features ==
=== Ignite Engine ===
A match between Bundesliga clubs Borussia Dortmund and Bayern München in FIFA 14

PlayStation 4 and Xbox One versions of the game feature a new game engine called Ignite Engine. This features both graphical and gameplay advances on the previous game engine used by the FIFA series, the Impact Engine (which is used for the PlayStation 3, PC and Xbox 360 versions of the game). Improvements include advanced AI to make players react more like real human beings (such as becoming anxious towards the end of a game when their team needs to score), "True Player Motion" to create more realistic movement from the players, and more enhanced realism for environmental features such as weather and the crowd, which responds to what is happening on the pitch in a manner similar to a real crowd (such as lamenting a near miss). It was initially thought that the PC version of the game would also feature the Ignite Engine, but in May 2013, EA Sports confirmed this would not be the case.

=== Licenses ===
The game features 33 fully licensed leagues, comprising over 600 clubs with over 16,000 players, as well as 47 international teams and a legends team. Included for the first time are three of the top leagues in South America: the Argentine Primera División, the Chilean Primera División and the Colombian Categoría Primera A.

=== Ultimate Team ===
FIFA Ultimate Team (FUT), which was introduced in FIFA 09 returns in FIFA 14. The game mode allows players to build their own team from real-world players and staff, which they can then use to compete in both online and offline tournaments and divisions. FUT also allows for a "single online match", where players can play a single match against another player that does not contribute to tournaments or seasons.

As players play both online and offline matches, they earn coins to spend on improving their team. Each game earns a certain amount of coins depending on whether the team won, lost or drew. Players and other items are acquired in the form of cards, which are obtained through buying packs or buying directly from other players through the transfer market. There are three different tiers of cards; bronze, silver, and gold, indicating the quality of the players. Packs also come in bronze, silver, and gold. There are also Special Packs, which feature rare cards. Packs can be purchased with coins, which are earned through playing FUT matches, or with FIFA points, which must be purchased with real-world money.

Players can also edit kit numbers and player roles for set pieces and can change the style of play of any given player. FUT seasons have been extended from the five divisions available in FIFA 13 to ten in FIFA 14. The Xbox One and Xbox 360 versions of FIFA 14 feature exclusive FUT content called "Legends". When purchasing Gold Packs, players can randomly acquire famous players from the past, such as George Weah, Pelé, Ruud Gullit, Dennis Bergkamp, Patrick Vieira, Gary Lineker and Freddie Ljungberg.

=== Stadiums ===
The game contains over 69 stadiums, including 32 real-world venues. New additions to FIFA 14 include La Bombonera (home stadium of Boca Juniors), Goodison Park (home stadium of Everton), and the Donbas Arena (home stadium of Shakhtar Donetsk). The Camp Nou (home stadium of Barcelona), which was removed from FIFA 13 due to licensing issues, has returned.

=== Goal celebrations ===
The game features new signature goal celebrations from a number of players including Cristiano Ronaldo's 'Calm down', Gareth Bale's '11 of Hearts', Lionel Messi's 'Point to the Sky', Daniel Sturridge's 'Riding the Wave', among others.

=== 2014 FIFA World Cup ===
On May 29, 2014, EA released a free update for the PlayStation 4 and Xbox One versions of FIFA 14 to featured 2014 FIFA World Cup game mode. However, the 2014 FIFA World Cup game mode only featured Friendly Match, Challenge and Ultimate Team.

== Release ==
A demo of the game was released worldwide on 10 September 2013 on PlayStation 3, Xbox 360 and Windows. Teams included in the demo are PSG, Barcelona, Manchester City, Tottenham Hotspur, A.C. Milan, Borussia Dortmund, New York Red Bulls and Boca Juniors.

The Wii, Nintendo 3DS, PlayStation 2, PlayStation Portable and PlayStation Vita versions are branded as FIFA 14: Legacy Edition, and retain features and gameplay from previous respective releases in the FIFA series, with only their kits, soundtrack and team squads updated. The PlayStation 2 version was not released in the United States or Canada, and was only available in Mexico, South America, Europe and Australasia.

The Android and iOS versions were released on 21 September 2013. They were the first FIFA games to be released under the free-to-play pricing model.

FIFA 14 was one of the extremely rare games to be released on three successive generations of a manufacturer's consoles nearly simultaneously, namely the PlayStation 2, 3, and 4.

=== Covers ===
Lionel Messi returns as the main cover star for all regions on the global cover, having also been on the cover of FIFA 13 and FIFA Street. The United States has both the global cover, and a Javier Hernández cover. It is the first title in the series since FIFA 2001 that the FIFA Soccer moniker was not used in North America.

Gareth Bale originally featured on the UK and Irish cover in the colours of his former club Tottenham Hotspur, but EA Sports later updated the cover to feature Bale in a Real Madrid kit, due to his transfer to the Spanish club.

Players featured alongside Messi in their respective regions include:

- Australia and New Zealand: Tim Cahill
- Austria: David Alaba
- Central and South America (except Brazil): Arturo Vidal and Radamel Falcao
- Czech Republic: Michal Kadlec
- Hungary: Balázs Dzsudzsák
- Italy: Stephan El Shaarawy
- Japan: Maya Yoshida and Makoto Hasebe
- Middle East: Mustafa Al-Bassas
- North America: Javier Hernández
- Poland: Robert Lewandowski
- Switzerland: Xherdan Shaqiri
- United Kingdom and Republic of Ireland: Gareth Bale

The PlayStation 4 and Xbox One versions of the game feature a completely different cover used for all regional releases for those platforms, featuring a static profile picture of Messi alone. This was also the case for the PC and the "Legacy Edition" of the game in some European countries.

== Reception ==
Reception

Aggregate scores
Aggregator	Score					
Aggregator	iOS	PC	PS3	PS4	Xbox 360	Xbox One
GameRankings	78.80%	82.67%	86.16%	87.92%	82.74%	89.92%
Metacritic	81/100	87/100	86/100	87/100	84/100	88/100

Review scores
Publication	Score					
Publication	iOS	PC	PS3	PS4	Xbox 360	Xbox One
Computer and Video Games					9/10	
Eurogamer			8/10	8/10		
Game Informer			8.75/10	7.75/10		
GameSpot			8/10	8/10		8/10
GamesRadar+					3.5/5	
IGN		9/10	9/10	9.1/10	9/10	9.1/10
PlayStation Official Magazine – UK			9/10	9/10		
Official Xbox Magazine (UK)					9/10	
MacLife	4/5					
Pocket Gamer	7/10					

FIFA 14 received primarily positive reviews across all platforms. The iOS version holds aggregate scores of 78.80% on GameRankings, based on ten reviews, and 81 out of 100 on Metacritic, based on sixteen reviews. The PC version holds scores of 82.67%, based on three reviews, and 87 out of 100, based on six reviews, the PlayStation 3 version holds scores of 86.16%, based on 22 reviews, and 86 out of 100, based on 37 reviews, the PlayStation 4 version holds scores of 87.92%, based on nineteen reviews, and 87 out of 100, based on 26 reviews, the Xbox 360 version holds scores of 82.74%, based on 23 reviews, and 84 out of 100, based on 41 reviews and the Xbox One version holds scores of 89.92%, based on twelve reviews, and 88 out of 100, based on 22 reviews.

Richard Moss of MacLife gave the iOS version 4 out of 5, saying "FIFA 14 feels more at home on iOS than any of its forebears, thanks to a deep-but-approachable Ultimate Team mode and a similarly layered gesture-driven control scheme." Pocket Gamer's Jon Mundy scored the game 7 out of 10, calling it "A typically polished footy game with a surprisingly generous freemium model. But EA needs to improve the way it plays touchscreen football if it's to keep the paying punters happy for FIFA 15."

Eurogamer's Tom Bramwell scored the PlayStation 3 version 8 out of 10, writing "FIFA 14 has plenty of substance—enough that you can play it for 12 months without growing too bored of it." Game Informer's Matthew Kato scored it 8.75 out of 10, arguing that "FIFA 14 adds just enough to stay one step ahead of stagnation, and remains hard to put down." GameSpot's Mark Walton scored it 8 out of 10, writing "Despite the lack of a defining new feature to attach itself to, FIFA 14 is far more than the sum of its parts. It's a fundamentally different experience to last year's game, and an entertaining one at that, moving the series ever closer to the realism it so proudly strives for." IGN's Daniel Krupa scored the PC, PlayStation 3 and Xbox 360 versions 8 out of 10, writing "FIFA 14 isn't a major landmark for the series in terms of innovation. Unlike recent iterations, it doesn't ask you to relearn key skills. But the changes have made FIFA more attacking, fun, welcoming, and attractive, and ultimately it's a stronger experience." PlayStation Official Magazine's Ben Wilson scored it 9 out of 10, writing "Whatever your thoughts on annual sports games, you really mustn't miss this one."

Eurogamer's Tom Bramwell gave the PlayStation 4 version the same score he had given to the PlayStation 3 version; 8 out of 10. He wrote writing "FIFA 14 on next-gen is the best version of the game." Game Informer's Matthew Kato was somewhat disappointed, feeling the game did not advance on the PlayStation 3 version enough. He scored it 7.75 out of 10, writing "Even with the ability to only pay $10 to upgrade an existing copy of the game, I don't think there's enough here to do that." GameSpot's Danny O'Dwyer scored the PlayStation 4 and Xbox One versions 8 out of 10, writing "this is the quintessential version of FIFA 14. It brings a level of authenticity never before seen in the genre and sets new standards for player control and stadium atmosphere. Too often have we seen football games flounder in the transition to new consoles, but FIFA 14 for the PlayStation 4 and Xbox One is a step above its peers." IGN's Daniel Krupa scored the PlayStation 4 and Xbox One versions 9.1 out of 10, writing "FIFA 14 isn't a leap into the future of the series; it has a lot in common with the version of FIFA 14 that's already out. There are real flashes of potential, though, and hints at where it may go in the future [...] what FIFA 14 on next-gen consoles does right now adds an impressive visual layer to an already brilliant sports game." PlayStation Official Magazine's Ben Wilson scored the game 9 out 10, writing "FIFA 14 is one of the few launch games to have evolved in ways that aren't solely graphics-based, and every one of its changes brings clear, distinguishable improvement."

Computer and Video Games's Ben Griffin scored the Xbox 360 version 9 out of 10, writing "FIFA 14 returns as the same ludicrously comprehensive sports game it's ever been, where any one mode could easily see you through to next season and beyond." GamesRadar+'s Alex Dale scored it 3.5 out of 5, writing "FIFA 14 requires more patience than most of its predecessors, and even when your patience is rewarded, it often feels like it's flattering to deceive." Official Xbox Magazine's Richard Meade was more impressed, scoring it 9 out of 10, and writing "FIFA 14 represents a difficult step forward for a very popular franchise, but a successful one nonetheless. The changes have such a significant effect, that returning fans may find them off-putting through the first five to ten games. But those that embrace them will be rewarded with perhaps the most satisfying, engaging FIFA yet."

During the 17th Annual D.I.C.E. Awards, the Academy of Interactive Arts & Sciences awarded FIFA 14 with "Sports Game of the Year".
