= Olé (John Newman song) =

Single by John Newman
- Released: 8 July 2016
- Recorded: 2015
- Length: 3:58
- Label: Island
- Songwriter: Calvin Harris
- Producer: Calvin Harris

John Newman singles chronology
"Give Me Your Love" (2016)	"Olé" (2016)	"Fire in Me" (2018)

"Olé" is a song by English singer John Newman, it was written and produced by Scottish DJ and record producer Calvin Harris. The song was released as a digital download on 8 July 2016 as a stand-alone single, peaking at number 120 and number 47 on the UK Singles Chart and Scottish Singles Chart respectively.

== Charts ==
Chart performance for "Olé"
Chart (2016)	Peak position
Belgium (Ultratip Flanders)	30
Belgium (Ultratip Wallonia)	16
Hungary (Rádiós Top 40)	7
Scotland Singles (OCC)	47
Sweden Heatseeker (Sverigetopplistan)	7
UK Singles (OCC)	120

== Release history ==
Release history for "Olé"
Region	Date	Format	Label
United Kingdom	8 July 2016	Digital download	Island
