= John Newman (singer) =

English singer, songwriter, musician, DJ, and record producer (born 1990)

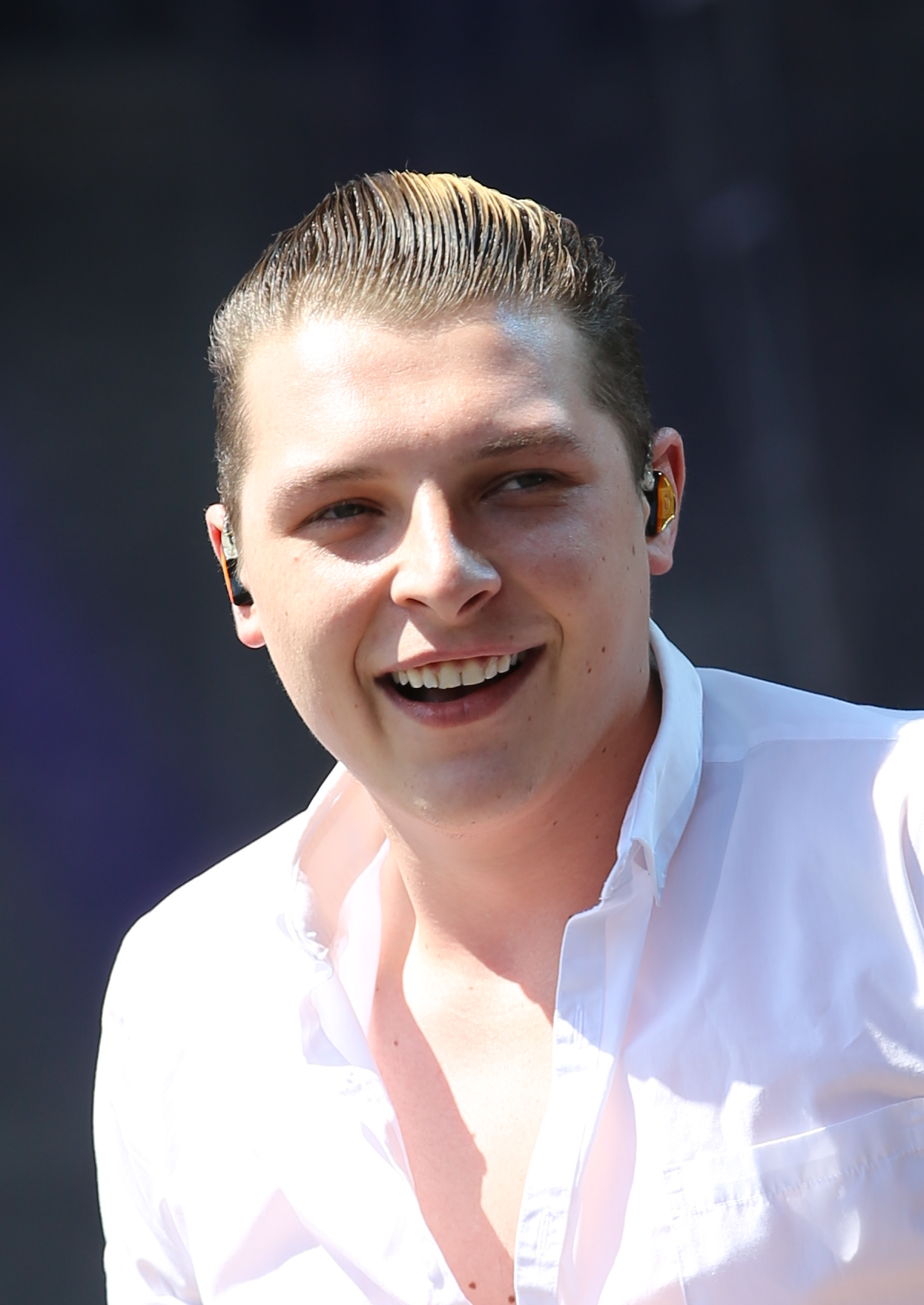
- Newman in June 2014

Background information
- Born: John William Peter Newman; 16 June 1990 (age 36); Settle, North Yorkshire, England
- Genres: Soul; pop; breakbeat; Northern soul
- Occupations: Singer; songwriter; musician; DJ; record producer
- Instruments: Vocals; piano; guitar
- Years active: 2010–present
- Labels: Island; Universal; Warner; Numana Music
- Spouse: Nana-Maria Newman (m. 2018)

John William Peter Newman (born 16 June 1990) is an English singer, songwriter, musician, DJ, and record producer. He first gained prominence for his single "Love Me Again" (2013), which peaked at number one on the UK singles chart, and entered the top ten in over twenty countries. The song also made an appearance in FIFA 14 and returned in FIFA 23. His 2013 debut album Tribute, reached number one on the UK Albums Chart and is certified platinum by the BPI.

Newman's other notable singles include "Feel the Love" featuring Rudimental (2012), "Cheating" (2013), "Blame" with Calvin Harris (2014), "Come and Get It" (2015), and "Give Me Your Love" with Sigala and Nile Rodgers (2016). As of March 2015, he has achieved four number one UK singles while his second studio album Revolve (2015), reached number three in his home country.

Newman's accolades includes four Brit Awards nominations, including for British Male Solo Artist in 2014, and an Ivor Novello Award nomination. He is also a recipient of 1 Los Premios 40, 1 UK Music Video Awards, 3 BMI Film & TV Awards, and a NME Award. As of March 2025 Newman has sold over 6 million records in the UK alone. He is also the younger brother of James Newman.

== Early life and career ==
John William Peter Newman was born on 16 June 1990 in Settle in the Yorkshire Dales and attended Settle College. When Newman was six years old, his father left the family, leaving his mother Jackie, his older brother James, and him with a pound a day. In his youth Newman was influenced by Motown and Stax that he heard via his mother. He was also influenced by the Northern soul sound, which also influenced his dance style. Many over 30s from Settle would leave on a weekend to go to Northern soul nights all over Yorkshire. He started playing guitar and writing his own songs at the age of 14 and soon learned how to record and produce himself, even making his own house tracks and DJing.

At the age of sixteen, Newman moved to Leeds and it was here that he developed his voice and sound. It was whilst he was in Leeds that two of his best friends (both involved in professional downhill mountain biking) died in a car crash. Newman said, "In that first year of moving to Leeds, instead of being sat with books all over the library desk and studying music, I actually studied it in a totally different way.... because of what I was going through, and I was getting smashed every night and enjoying the student life but then sitting with a guitar and crying all night writing music." It was whilst in Leeds that he also found other people who appreciated Motown and Stax music and a time that Newman said "matured me in a musical way so much, I was writing pop music and now I feel like I'm writing music that I love and can really attach to." He studied for a BTEC in popular music from Leeds College of Music.

At the age of twenty, Newman moved to London, started a band, played live and was signed to Island Records. While working at The Silver Bullet bar, he made friends with Piers Agget, one fourth of Rudimental. He released "Cheating" as a download song and plays an acoustic version of the track at gigs.

== Music career ==
=== 2012: Breakthrough ===
In May 2012, John Newman was featured on Rudimental's single "Feel the Love". The single peaked at number one on the UK Singles Chart in early June 2012; the song was also a top 5 hit in Australia, Belgium, the Netherlands and New Zealand. The song has since been certified 2× Platinum by the Australian Recording Industry Association. The song was also featured in the 2012 video game Need for Speed: Most Wanted and is used in 2013 promotional advertising for Foxtel Australia. The song used the promo of MTV Latin America's The Pauly D Project. In November 2012, he featured on Rudimental's follow-up single, "Not Giving In", which peaked at number 14 on the UK Singles Chart, the song was also a top 20 hit in Australia and New Zealand. It came in at number 16 in the 2012 Triple J Hottest 100, announced on Australia Day 2013. It was featured in the first episode of season three of Teen Wolf.

=== 2013–2014: Tribute ===
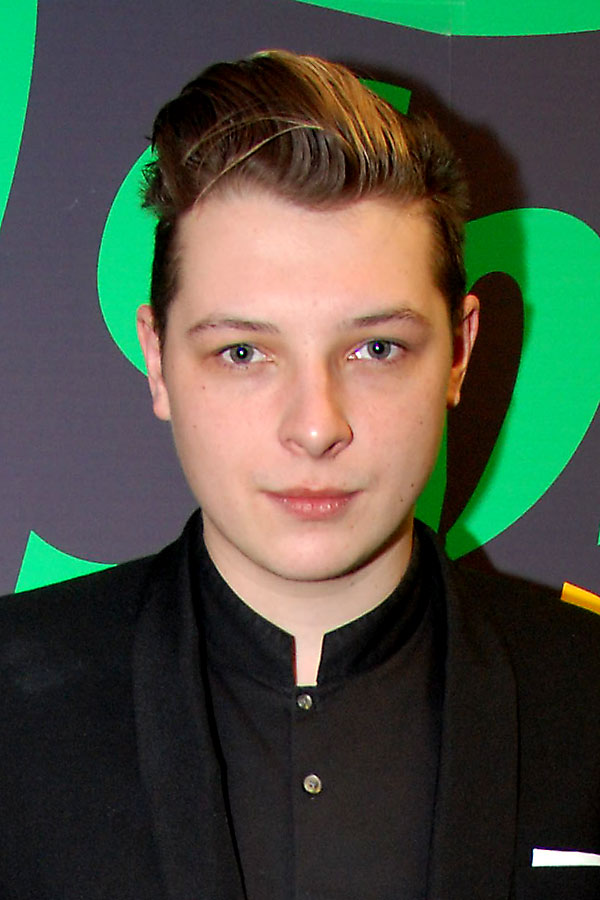
Newman in 2014

In June 2013, John Newman released his debut single "Love Me Again" as the lead single from his debut studio album. In an interview with Digital Spy, Newman was asked if he sensed that the song had something special about it in the studio. He said, "Yeah. The guy I wrote it with, we turned around and had massive grins on our faces thinking, 'There's something good here'. But you just never know how good it is, you know?". Newman was also asked if it was hard to write the lyrics about love and break-up; he responded: "No, it's the only place where I really open up to somebody, through my music. I'm producing [the album] and writing it, it's good. I like to keep a hold of everything". The song peaked at number one on the UK Singles Chart. The song was also a top 10 hit in more than 10 countries including Australia, Austria, Belgium, Denmark, Germany, Ireland, New Zealand, Norway, and Switzerland. It was also featured on the soundtrack of FIFA 14. In mid-2013 a remix of "Love Me Again" was released by DJ and record producer "Kove", and received major airplay on EDM channels, including SiriusXM's BPM. On 6 October 2013, Newman released "Cheating" as the second single from Tribute. The song peaked at number 9 on the UK Singles Chart. The song has also charted in Belgium and Ireland. Tribute was released on 14 October 2013.

Talking to Digital Spy about the album he said: "I was going through a pretty bad break-up while I was making the album and I felt the title really needed to resonate. This record is a culmination of my life to this point; it's who I am and I wanted to thank everyone who has helped, supported, loved me and been an inspiration to me. I'm so proud of this album, it expresses me as a producer, as a songwriter and an artist, and I can't wait for people to hear it." On 20 October 2013, the album entered the UK Albums Chart at number one. Talking to the Official Charts Company Newman said: "It's such an amazing thing for an artist to have a number one album, especially on a debut. It means so much to me and I just want to say thank you to everyone who has supported me and helped make this happen. Can't wait to see everyone on tour next week!" In December 2013, he released "Losing Sleep" as the third single from the album. That same month, Newman made several appearances on Jools' Holland's Annual Hootenanny on the BBC, performing solo, with Rudimental, and with Jools Holland's Rhythm and Blues Orchestra. Also in December 2013, "Love Me Again" entered the top 40 charts in Canada and the United States. He was nominated for three Brit Awards, including British Male Solo Artist and British Single of the Year, at the 2014 Brit Awards.

=== 2014–2015: Revolve ===
In August 2014, Newman stated in an interview that he is "ready to move on to album two", stating that he's "got all the concepts, all the artwork, [he's] done all the marketing and release strategies and video ideas for the songs [he's] got." Newman is featured on Calvin Harris' single "Blame", which was released 7 September 2014. It debuted at number one on the UK Singles Chart. On 1 June 2015, Newman released "Come and Get It", the first single from his second studio album. The song is featured on the soundtrack of Madden NFL 16. Newman's second studio album Revolve, was released on 16 October 2015.

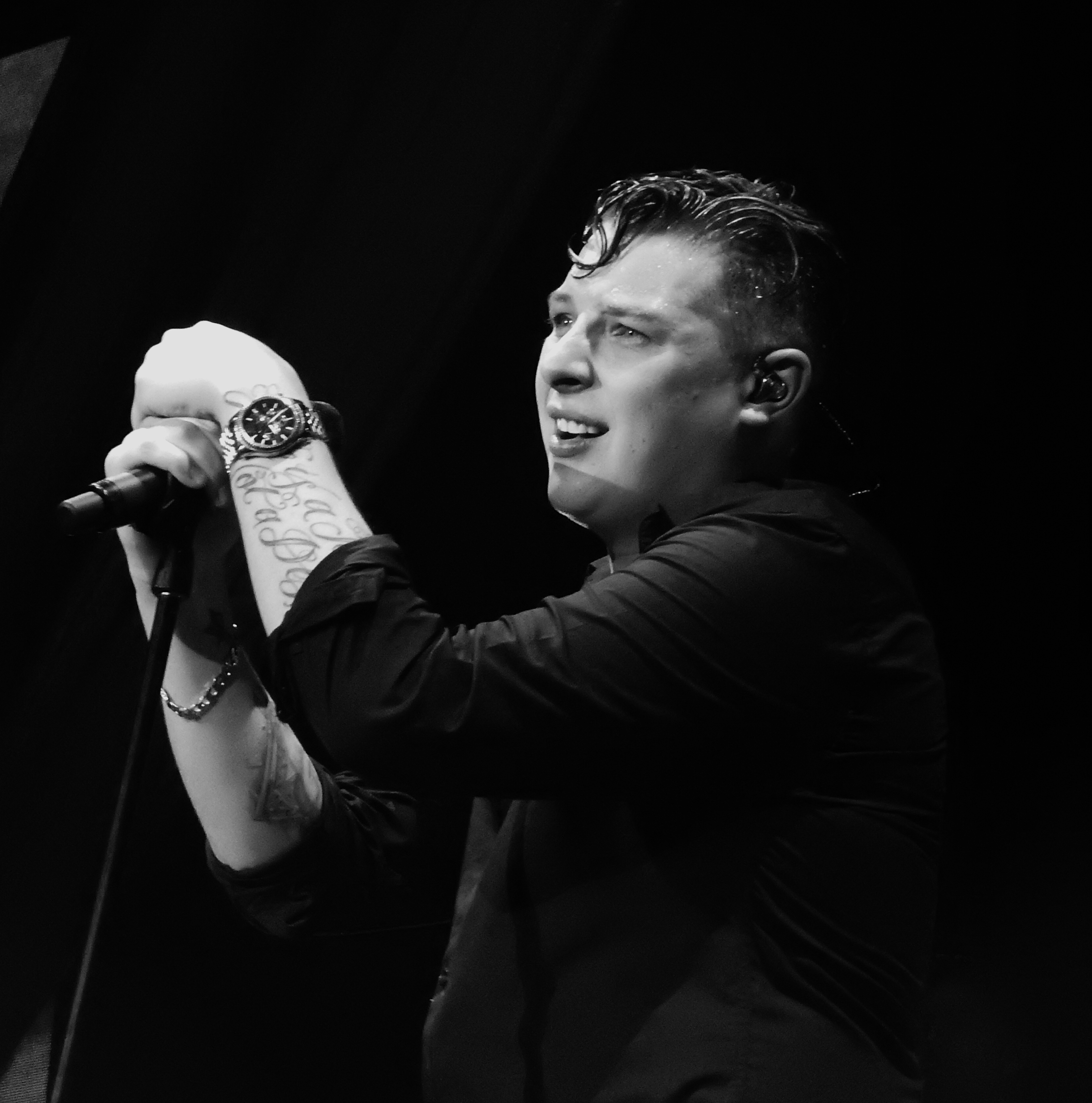
Newman performing in 2016

=== 2016–present: A.N.i.M.A.L, solo hiatus and return to music ===
In July 2016, Newman released the song "Olé" as a non-album single. In March 2019, he released "Feelings", co-written with Swedish collective Blnk and co-produced with Swedish producer Jarly.

On 27 September 2017 John Newman performed at the 2017 Asian Indoor and Martial Arts Games closing ceremony held at the Olympic Stadium in Ashgabat, Turkmenistan.

On 30 August 2019, Newman released the song "Without You" with Scottish singer Nina Nesbitt. The song appears on Newman's first EP A.N.i.M.A.L, which was released on 27 September 2019.

On 8 June 2020, it was announced that Newman had collaborated with British DJ duo Sigma on their single "High on You". It was released on 12 June 2020.

Newman announced later in June 2020 that he was taking a break from the music industry, and that he had left his record label and his artist management company. He mentioned in the social media announcement that his work had been causing him mental health issues, and that he would continue to release collaborations with other artists throughout the year but he was pausing his solo career.

He returned with "Waiting for a Lifetime", which peaked No. 9 on Billboard's Dance/Mix Show Airplay Chart in May 2022, and also released his song "Holy Love".

On 1 May 2026, Newman released the single "Merry Go".

== Personal life ==
Newman has twice been diagnosed with brain tumours, undergoing surgery in 2012 and again in 2016. He married his Danish girlfriend, Nana-Maria on 18 August 2018 in London.

He is the younger brother of singer-songwriter James Newman.

In July 2019, whilst being interviewed by the BBC about his upcoming tour, Newman opened up about his personal struggles with mental health. He went on to explain that he found himself comparing himself to other musicians around him that had seen more success both musically and financially. To prevent himself experiencing the same struggles again, much smaller venues were chosen for his 2019 tour and he was to travel between venues in a campervan with his band.

== Awards and nominations ==
List of awards and nominations received by John Newman
Year	Organization	Award	Work	Result
2012	Popjustice £20 Music Prize	Best British Pop Single	"Feel the Love" (ft. Rudimental)	Nominated
2013	BRIT Awards	Best British Single	"Feel the Love" (ft. Rudimental)	Nominated
2013	Premios 40 Principales	Best International New Act	—N/a	Nominated
2013	Premios 40 Principales	Best International Video	"Love Me Again"	Won
2013	UK Music Video Awards	Best Dance Video – UK	"Not Giving In" (ft. Alex Clare & Rudimental)	Won
2014	MTV Europe Music Awards	Best Push Act	—N/a	Nominated
2014	BRIT Awards	British Male Solo Artist	—N/a	Nominated
2014	BRIT Awards	British Single	"Love Me Again"	Nominated
2014	BRIT Awards	British Video	"Love Me Again"	Nominated
2014	Ivor Novello Awards	Best Song Musically & Lyrically	"Love Me Again"	Nominated
2015	BMI London Awards	Award-Winning Song	"Love Me Again"	Won
2015	BMI London Awards	Award-Winning Song	"Blame" (with Calvin Harris)	Won
2015	iHeartRadio Music Awards	Dance Song of the Year	"Blame" (with Calvin Harris)	Nominated
2015	International Dance Music Awards	Best Commercial/Pop Dance Track	"Blame" (with Calvin Harris)	Nominated
2015	European Border Breakers Awards	European Border Breakers Award: UK	Tribute	Won
2016	BMI Pop Awards	Award-Winning Song	"Blame" (with Calvin Harris)	Won

== Discography ==
Albums

- Tribute (2013)
- Revolve (2015)

== Tour ==
=== Opening act ===
- Ellie Goulding's Delirium World Tour (2016)
