= Sub Focus discography =

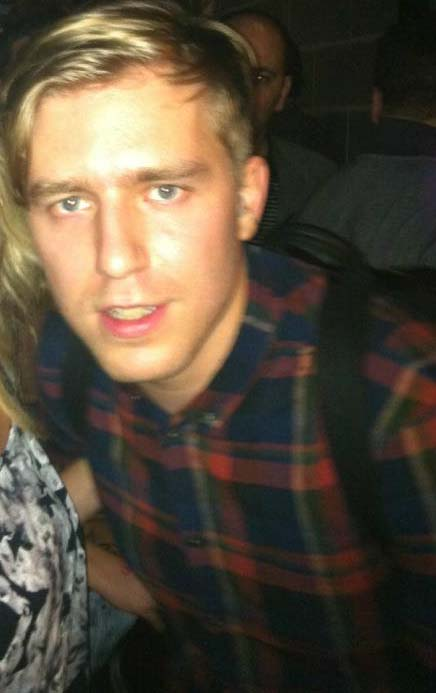
- Studio albums: 5
- Singles: 47

English DJ and record producer Sub Focus has released five studio albums and 47 singles.

In March 2005, he had a number-one single on the UK Dance Chart with "X-Ray / Scarecrow". The single reached number 60 on the UK Singles Chart. In June 2008, he hit number one on the UK Dance Chart again with "Timewarp / Join the Dots". In August 2009, he entered the UK top 40 for the first time with "Rock It / Follow the Light", which peaked at number 38. "Rock It / Follow the Light" also got him a third UK Dance Chart number one, as well as reaching the B-list of BBC Radio 1's playlist. On 12 October 2009, he released his debut studio album Sub Focus, the album peaked at number 51 on the UK Albums Chart.

In 2012, he released "Out the Blue" featuring Alice Gold and it peaked at number 23 on the UK Singles Chart. It was followed by "Tidal Wave" featuring Alpines which peaked at number 12 on the UK Singles Chart. On 12 May 2013, "Endorphins" featuring Alex Clare was released, continuing his chart success, peaking at number 10 on the UK Singles Chart. The album's fifth single "Turn It Around" was released on 22 September 2013 and peaked at number 14. His second studio album Torus was released on 30 September 2013. The sixth single from Torus, "Turn Back Time", climbed up the UK Singles Chart to number 85 prior to independent release and rose further after being placed on the B-list of BBC Radio 1's playlist. A week later, it climbed 49 places to number 36, and later reached a peak of number 10.

== Studio albums ==
| Title | Details | Peak chart positions | | | | Certifications |
| Title | Details | UK | UK Dance | BEL (Fl) | NZ | Certifications |
|---|---|---|---|---|---|---|
| Sub Focus | Released: 12 October 2009; Label: RAM (RAMMLP13CD/RAMMLP13); Formats: 12" LP, CD, digital download | 51 | 2 | — | — | BPI: Silver |
| Torus | Released: 30 September 2013; Label: Virgin EMI; Formats: 12" LP, CD, digital download | 11 | 1 | 180 | — | BPI: Silver |
| Portals (with Wilkinson) | Released: 9 October 2020; Label: Virgin EMI; Formats: 12" LP, CD, digital download | 68 | 1 | — | 26 | |
| Evolve | Released: 12 May 2023; Label: Virgin EMI; Formats: 12" LP, CD, digital download | 33 | 3 | — | 8 | BPI: Silver |
| Contact | Released: 21 November 2025; Label: Virgin EMI; Formats: 12" LP, CD, digital download | 10 | 1 | — | 14 | |
"—" denotes an album that did not chart or was not released.

== Singles ==
| Year | Title | Peak chart positions | | | | | Certifications | Album |
| Year | Title | UK | UK Dance | BEL (Fl) | NZ Hot | SCO | Certifications | Album |
|---|---|---|---|---|---|---|---|---|
| 2003 | "Down the Drain / Hot Line" | — | — | — | — | — | | Non-album singles |
| 2004 | "Acid Test / Get on Up" | — | — | — | — | — | | Non-album singles |
| 2004 | "Soundguy / Bluenote" | — | — | — | — | — | | Non-album singles |
| 2005 | "Frozen Solid / Juno" | — | — | — | — | — | | Non-album singles |
| 2005 | "X-Ray / Scarecrow" | 60 | 1 | — | — | — | | Non-album singles |
| 2006 | "Airplane / Flamenco" | — | — | — | — | — | | Non-album singles |
| 2007 | "Special Place / Druggy" | — | — | — | — | — | | Non-album singles |
| 2008 | "Timewarp / Join the Dots" | 92 | 7 | — | — | — | | Sub Focus |
| 2009 | "Rock It / Follow the Light" | 38 | 7 | — | — | — | RMNZ: Gold | Sub Focus |
| 2009 | "Could This Be Real" | 41 | 4 | — | — | — | | Sub Focus |
| 2010 | "Splash" (featuring Coco) | 41 | 7 | — | — | — | | Sub Focus |
| 2011 | "Flashing Lights" (with Chase & Status featuring Takura) | 98 | 15 | 89 | — | — | | No More Idols |
| 2012 | "Falling Down" (featuring Kenzie May) | — | — | — | — | — | | Torus |
| 2012 | "Out the Blue" (featuring Alice Gold) | 23 | 5 | — | — | 28 | | Torus |
| 2012 | "Tidal Wave" (featuring Alpines) | 12 | 4 | 65 | — | 15 | BPI: Platinum; RMNZ: Platinum | Torus |
| 2013 | "Endorphins" (featuring Alex Clare) | 10 | 7 | 134 | — | 11 | BPI: Silver; RMNZ: Gold | Torus |
| 2013 | "Turn It Around" (featuring Kele) | 14 | 5 | — | — | 14 | | Torus |
| 2013 | "Turn Back Time" | 10 | 3 | 54 | — | 9 | BPI: Silver | Torus |
| 2014 | "Close" (featuring MNEK) | — | 32 | — | — | — | | Torus |
| 2016 | "Nobody Knows" | — | — | — | — | — | | Non-album singles |
| 2016 | "Love Divine" | — | — | — | — | — | | Non-album singles |
| 2017 | "Lingua" (featuring Stylo G) | — | — | — | — | — | | Non-album singles |
| 2017 | "Don't You Feel It" (featuring Alma) | — | 29 | — | — | — | RMNZ: Gold | Non-album singles |
| 2017 | "Trouble" (with Rudimental featuring Chronixx and Maverick Sabre) | — | — | — | — | — | RMNZ: Gold | Non-album singles |
| 2018 | "Take It Up" (with Wilkinson) | — | — | — | — | — | RMNZ: Gold | Non-album singles |
| 2018 | "Desire" (with Dimension) | 51 | 8 | — | — | 35 | BPI: Gold; RMNZ: 3× Platinum | Organ |
| 2019 | "Solar System / Siren" | — | — | — | 37 | — | BPI: Silver; RMNZ: Platinum (Siren); RMNZ: 2× Platinum (Solar System) | Non-album single |
| 2019 | "Illuminate" (with Wilkinson) | — | — | — | 12 | — | RMNZ: Platinum | Portals |
| 2020 | "Just Hold On" (with Wilkinson) | — | — | — | 9 | — | | Portals |
| 2020 | "Air I Breathe" (with Wilkinson) | — | — | — | — | 85 | RMNZ: Gold | Portals |
| 2020 | "Turn the Lights Off" (with Wilkinson) | — | — | — | — | — | | Portals |
| 2021 | "Freedom" (with Wilkinson featuring Empara Mi) | — | — | — | 23 | — | RMNZ: Gold | Portals |
| 2022 | "It's Time" (with Gene Farris) | — | — | — | 18 | × | | Evolve |
| 2022 | "Off the Ground" | — | — | — | 18 | × | RMNZ: Platinum | Evolve |
| 2022 | "Ready to Fly" (with Dimension) | 29 | 7 | — | 6 | × | BPI: Gold; RMNZ: Platinum | Evolve |
| 2023 | "Vibration (One More Time)" (featuring AR/CO) | — | — | — | 6 | × | RMNZ: Gold | Evolve |
| 2023 | "Fine Day" | — | — | — | 12 | × | | Evolve |
| 2023 | "Calling for a Sign" (featuring Kelli-Leigh) | — | — | — | 22 | × | | Evolve |
| 2024 | "Go Back" (with John Summit featuring Julia Church) | — | — | — | — | × | RMNZ: Platinum | Comfort in Chaos and Contact |
| 2024 | "Wildfire" | — | — | — | 11 | × | | Contact |
| 2024 | "Angel" (with Dimension, Nghtmre and Mougleta) | — | — | — | — | × | | TBA |
| 2024 | "Push the Tempo" (with Katy B) | 54 | 7 | — | 12 | × | BPI: Silver; RMNZ: Gold | Contact |
| 2025 | "On & On" (with bbyclose) | 80 | 23 | — | 12 | × | BPI: Silver; RMNZ: Gold | Contact |
| 2025 | "Miracle" (with Culture Shock and Fragma) | — | — | — | — | × | | Non-album single |
| 2025 | "Original Don" (featuring Irah and Fireboy DML) | — | — | — | 3 | × | | Contact |
| 2025 | "Entwined" (featuring Grimes) | — | — | — | 4 | × | | Contact |
| 2025 | "So Many Colours" (featuring Poppy Baskcomb) | — | — | — | 12 | × | | Contact |
"—" denotes a release that did not chart or has not been released.

=== Featured singles ===
| Year | Title | Album |
|---|---|---|
| 2025 | "No Comment" (Kneecap featuring Sub Focus) | TBA |

== Other charted songs ==
| Year | Title | Peak chart positions | | Album |
| Year | Title | EST Air. | NZ Hot | Album |
|---|---|---|---|---|
| 2021 | "Airplane" (Culture Shock remix) | — | 14 | Reworks I |
| 2021 | "Timewarp" (Dimension remix) | — | 11 | Reworks I |
| 2021 | "Last Jungle" (Camo & Krooked and Mefjus remix) | — | 25 | Reworks I |
| 2023 | "Trip" (with Metrik) | — | 32 | Evolve |
| 2023 | "Alarm" (featuring MC ID) | — | 26 | Evolve |
| 2023 | "Waiting" (with Pola & Bryson featuring Kelli-Leigh) | — | 20 | Evolve |
| 2023 | "I Found You" (featuring Hayla) | — | 7 | Evolve |
| 2025 | "Ecuador" (with Fireboy DML) | — | 29 | Contact |
| 2025 | "Elevate" | 96 | 12 | Contact |
| 2025 | "Roll Too Deep" (with Subsonic) | — | 28 | Contact |
"—" denotes a recording that did not chart or was not released in that territory. "*" denotes that the chart did not exist at that time.

== Remixes ==
| Year | Title | Artist |
|---|---|---|
| 2005 | "Squelch" | Baron |
| 2005 | "Smack My Bitch Up" | The Prodigy |
| 2006 | "Aliens" | Dr. Octagon |
| 2006 | "Nervous" | DJ Fresh (featuring Mary Byker) |
| 2008 | "We Are the People" | Empire of the Sun |
| 2009 | "Ghosts 'n' Stuff" | deadmau5 (featuring Rob Swire) |
| 2009 | "Take Me to the Hospital" | The Prodigy |
| 2009 | "Dirtee Cash" | Dizzee Rascal |
| 2009 | "Twerk" | Basement Jaxx (featuring Yo! Majesty) |
| 2010 | "Hold On" | Rusko (featuring Amber Coffman) |
| 2010 | "Selfmachine" | I Blame Coco |
| 2013 | "Endorphins" (with Fred V & Grafix) | Sub Focus (featuring Alex Clare) |
| 2017 | "Run Up" | Major Lazer (featuring PartyNextDoor and Nicki Minaj) |
| 2017 | "Don't You Feel It" (with 1991) | Sub Focus (featuring Alma) |
| 2019 | "Mother Tongue" | Bring Me the Horizon |
| 2020 | "Just Hold On" (with Wilkinson vs. Pola & Bryson) | Sub Focus and Wilkinson |
| 2021 | "Freedom" (with Wilkinson vs. High Contrast) | Sub Focus and Wilkinson (featuring Empara Mi) |
| 2021 | "Easier" | CamelPhat (featuring Lowes) |
| 2021 | "All You Ever Wanted" | Rag'n'Bone Man |
| 2022 | "Do It to It" | Acraze (featuring Cherish) |
| 2023 | "Desire" | Calvin Harris (with Sam Smith) |

== Guest appearances and collaborations ==
| Year | Title | Artist | Album |
|---|---|---|---|
| 2004 | "Ghost" | Sub Focus and Danny Wheeler | Ghost / Lost Highway |
| 2004 | "Lost Highway" | Sub Focus and Danny Wheeler | Ghost / Lost Highway |
| 2005 | "Silicon Chop" | Tim Exile (featuring Sub Focus) | Pro Agonist |
| 2006 | "Verano" | Sub Focus and Howtek (featuring Brookes Brothers) | Verano / Arachnophobia |
| 2007 | "Borrowed Time" | TC (featuring Sub Focus) | Evolution |
| 2008 | "Borrowed Time" (VIP mix) | TC (featuring Sub Focus) | Borrowed Time VIP / Pornstar |
| 2008 | "Distress Signal" | Pendulum and Sub Focus | Bootleg |
| 2011 | "Flashing Lights" | Chase & Status and Sub Focus (featuring Takura) | No More Idols |
| 2011 | "Stomp" | Sub Focus | RAMM 100 |
| 2018 | "Circadian" | Sub Focus | Mind State, Vol. 1 |
| 2020 | "1000 Miles" | Machinedrum (featuring Sub Focus) | A View of U |
| 2020 | "Destiny" | Netsky and Sub Focus (featuring Jozzy) | Second Nature |
| 2022 | "Recombine" | Culture Shock and Sub Focus | Sequel |
| 2025 | "No Comment" | Kneecap (featuring Sub Focus) | TBA |

== Production credits ==
| Year | Title | Artist | Album |
|---|---|---|---|
| 2010 | "Kickstarts" | Example | Won't Go Quietly |
| 2023 | "Friend of Mine" | Jess Glynne | JESS |

== VIP mixes ==
| Year | Title | Release |
|---|---|---|
| 2007 | "Verano" (VIP mix) | Free download |
| 2010 | "Timewarp" (VIP mix) | Splash / Timewarp VIP |
| 2010 | "Coming Closer" (VIP mix) | Splash (Rusko remix) / Coming Closer VIP |
| 2012 | "Falling Down" (VIP mix) | Falling Down (EP) |
| 2021 | "Could This Be Real" (Sub Focus 125 VIP) | Reworks I |
