= Torus (album) =

Studio album by Sub Focus
- Released: 30 September 2013
- Recorded: 2010–2013
- Genres: Drum and bass; dubstep; electro house; deep house
- Length: 58:42
- Labels: RAM; Mercury; Virgin EMI
- Producers: Sub Focus; Culture Shock

Sub Focus chronology
Sub Focus (2009)	Torus (2013)	Portals (2020)

Singles from Torus
- 1. "Falling Down" Released: 1 January 2012; 2. "Out the Blue" Released: 12 April 2012; 3. "Tidal Wave" Released: 4 November 2012; 4. "Endorphins" Released: 12 May 2013; 5. "Turn It Around" Released: 22 September 2013; 6. "Turn Back Time" Released: 22 December 2013; 7. "Close" Released: 21 April 2014

Torus is the second studio album by British DJ and record producer Sub Focus. The album was released on 30 September 2013, through RAM Records, Mercury Records and Virgin EMI Records.

== Musical concept and songs ==
Torus is the geometric name for the shape in Sub Focus' logo. It originally featured on his eponymous debut album cover and the shape has played a major visual role in his live shows, promotion and artwork. The title track was written as an intro to Douwma's live sets, in preparation for a Brixton performance in 2012. He wanted to start his sets with a low tempo and gradually speed up.

"Safe in Sound" was one of the earliest tracks to be completed and was written with Seton Daunt and later given the Mary O'Hara sample.

"Endorphins" originally had a female vocalist, and was given to several artists but in the end Alex Clare visited Nick's studio to record what would be the final version of the track.

"Twilight" was written as an ambient contrast to the club-orientated songs on the album, as Douwma viewed the album as a journey and wanted constant progression.

The synth hook on "Falling Down" was originally intended for the Chase & Status and Takura collaboration "Flashing Lights", but did not fit the song so was re-used as a starting point for the new song. While the track was being finished, Skrillex coincidentally visited the studios to meet Caspa and Douwma showed him the track. Skrillex enjoyed it and decided to release it alongside remixes on Owsla.

"Turn Back Time" was one of the last songs to be finished on the album. At the time, he was experimenting with 1990s rave samples, and the song originally used a sample but was re-recorded.

"You Make It Better" was also one of the final songs to be finished on the album. At the time, it was just a loop, and Culture Shock had a lot of ideas to develop it. They wanted a hook for the breakdown of the song, so TC recorded vocals for it.

The vocals on "Tidal Wave" were originally on another Sub Focus demo but instead got used on the "Tidal Wave" instrumental.

"Until the End" was inspired by the Drive soundtrack and was written as a concluding track for the album.

== Track listing ==
Standard edition
No.	Title	Writer(s)	Length
1.	"Torus"	Nick Douwma	5:52
2.	"Safe in Sound"	Douwma; Seton Daunt; Julian Bunetta; Mary O'Hara	4:39
3.	"Endorphins" (featuring Alex Clare)	Douwma; Amanda Ghost; Ian Dench; Takura Tendayi	3:55
4.	"Out the Blue" (featuring Alice Gold)	Douwma; Alice McLaughlin; Bryn Christopher	4:38
5.	"Twilight"	Douwma; Teemu Brunila	3:09
6.	"Close" (featuring MNEK)	Douwma; Uzoechi Emenike	5:09
7.	"Turn It Around" (featuring Kele)	Douwma; Kele Okereke	3:15
8.	"Out of Reach" (featuring JayEllDee)	Douwma; Daunt; Tendayi; Jenna Dickens	4:03
9.	"Falling Down" (featuring Kenzie May)	Douwma; Kenzie May; Thomas Havelock	5:09
10.	"Turn Back Time"	Douwma; Yolanda Quartey; Todd Terry; Kim English; Frankie Feliciano	5:07
11.	"You Make It Better" (featuring Culture Shock and TC)	Douwma; James Pountney; Tom Casswell	5:58
12.	"Tidal Wave" (featuring Alpines)	Douwma; Ghost; Catherine Pockson; Robert Matthews	3:49
13.	"Until the End" (featuring Foxes)	Douwma; Louisa Allen; Jonnali Parmenius; Mans Wrendenberg	4:05
Total length:			58:42

Deluxe edition bonus tracks
No.	Title	Writer(s)	Length
14.	"Eclipse"	Douwma	4:41
15.	"Original"	Douwma	3:30
16.	"Falling Down" (featuring Kenzie May) (VIP)	Douwma; May; Havelock	4:42
17.	"Endorphins" (featuring Alex Clare) (Sub Focus vs. Fred V & Grafix remix)	Douwma; Ghost; Dench; Tendayi	4:35

Double vinyl
No.	Title	Length
1.	"Safe in Sound"	4:39
2.	"You Make It Better" (featuring Culture Shock and TC)	5:54
3.	"Eclipse"	4:41
4.	"Original"	3:30

Notes

- "Safe in Sound" features uncredited vocals from Julian Bunetta.
- "Twilight" features uncredited vocals from Teemu Brunila.
- "Turn Back Time" features uncredited vocals from Yolanda Quartey.

Sample credits

- "Torus" contains samples of Charles I. Halt's recording of the 1980 Rendlesham Forest incident.
- "Safe in Sound" contains samples of the Irish folk song "Óró Mo Bháidín", performed by Mary O'Hara.
- "Turn Back Time" contains elements of the song "Brass Disk", performed by Duprée and written by Todd Terry, and lyrics from the song "Missing You", written by Kim English and Frankie Feliciano.

== Personnel ==
- Nick "Sub Focus" Douwma – producer, mixing (all tracks), remix and additional production (17)

Additional musicians

- Alex Clare – vocals (3)
- Alice McLaughlin – vocals (4)
- Amanda Ghost – writer (3, 12)
- Bryn Christopher – writer (4)
- Catherine Pockson – vocals (12)
- Frankie Feliciano – co-producer (sampled) (10)
- Fred Vahrman and Joshua Jackson – remix and additional production (17)
- Ian Dench – writer (3)
- James "Culture Shock" Pountney – co-producer (11)
- Jenna "JayEllDee" Dickens – vocals (8)
- Jonnali Parmenius – writer (13)
- Julian Bunetta – vocals (2)
- Kele Okereke – vocals (7)
- Kenzie May – vocals (9, 16)
- Kim English – vocals (sampled) (10)
- Louisa "Foxes" Allen – vocals (13)
- Mans Wrendenberg – writer (13)
- Mary O'Hara – vocals (sampled) (2)
- Robert Matthews – co-producer (12)
- Seton Daunt – guitars (2, 8)
- Takura Tendayi – writer (3, 8)
- Tom "TC" Casswell – vocals (11)
- Teemu Brunila – vocals (5)
- Thomas "Tom Cane" Havelock – writer (9, 16)
- Todd Terry – co-producer (sampled) (10)
- Uzoechi "MNEK" Emenike – vocals (6)
- Yolanda Quartey – vocals (10)

== Charts ==
Chart (2013)	Peak position
Belgian Albums (Ultratop Flanders)	180
UK Albums (Official Charts)	11
UK Dance Albums (Official Charts)	1

== Release history ==
Region	Date	Label	Format
Various	30 September 2013	RAM; Mercury; Virgin EMI	7-inch; CD; digital download
