= Amanda Ghost =

British music executive and songwriter (born 1974)

- Born: Amanda Louisa Gosein; 10 July 1974 (age 52); Enfield, London, England
- Genres: Alternative rock; pop rock; trip hop
- Occupations: Record executive; songwriter; singer
- Years active: 1997–present
- Labels: Amanda Ghost Limited.; Plan A; Epic

Amanda Louisa Gosein-Cameron (born 10 July 1974), known professionally as Amanda Ghost, is a British record executive, songwriter and singer who was president of Epic Records from 2009 to 2010. Ghost is a three-time Ivor Novello Award winner, a Golden Globe nominee, and worked on five songs and albums that have been nominated for Grammy Awards.

== Early life and education ==
Ghost was the youngest of three girls to a Gibraltarian mother and an Indo-Trinidadian father. She grew up in North London and studied at the London College of Fashion, but left when she was signed as a recording artist to Warner Records.

== Early career (1997–2014) ==
At the age of 19, Ghost began writing songs with Ian Dench. In 1997, she contributed her version of Gary Numan's "Absolution" to the tribute album Random. Her first recording contract was in 2000 with Warner Records in Los Angeles, for whom she recorded her first album, Ghost Stories. Her second album, Blood on the Line EP, was released in 2006 on her own record label, Plan A Records.

Ghost won the Ivor Novello Award three times, and was a 2009 Golden Globe nominee. She was nominated for three Grammy Awards, including for the songs "You're Beautiful" by James Blunt in 2007, and "Once in a Lifetime", which she co-wrote with Scott McFarnon, Ian Dench, Jody Street, James Dring and Beyoncé in 2010, as part of the soundtrack from Beyoncé's film Cadillac Records, and which was nominated for Best Song Written for a Motion Picture. She was nominated for the 2010 Album of the Year for Beyoncé's I Am... Sasha Fierce. In addition, Ghost worked on the song "Beautiful Liar" for Beyoncé and Shakira, which was nominated for Best Pop Collaboration with Vocals in 2008.

Ghost co-wrote Jordin Sparks' second single "Tattoo" which reached number eight on the Billboard Hot 100 Chart, and collaborated with John Legend on the lyrics for the track "Getting Nowhere" by Magnetic Man.

In February 2009, Ghost became the president of Epic Records, replacing Charlie Walk.

In 2009, Ghost collaborated on the songs "For the Glory" and "Vanity Kills" by Ian Brown (featured on Brown's album My Way), which she co-wrote with Brown and Dave McCracken. She also co-wrote the Shakira singles "Give It Up to Me" and "Gypsy", from the album She Wolf.

Ghost was fired from her position as president of Epic Records in 2010 after 20 months. That same year, she established Outsiders, a joint venture with Sony Music. She has collaborated with Florence and the Machine, Mark Ronson, and A$AP Rocky.

== Later career: Unigram (2015–present) ==
In 2015, Ghost founded the production company Unigram with film and television producer Gregor Cameron and in partnership with Access Industries. She also is the CEO of AI Film.

Ghost worked on the 2015 film Kill Your Friends, based on the novel by John Niven. She was the executive music producer on a joint venture with Lee Daniels and Warner Recorded Music on The United States vs Billie Holiday, which won the Grammy Award for Best Compilation Soundtrack for Visual Media in 2022.

In 2023, Ghost co-produced the title music "Mad About the Boy" for the documentary Mad About the Boy: The Noel Coward Story, which was covered by Adam Lambert for the film. That year, Ghost also was executive producer for the film She Came to Me, and worked on the film Tetris.

Ghost was a lead producer on the 2024 musical theatre adaptation of The Great Gatsby, called Gatsby:An American Myth, which was co-composed by Florence Welch of Florence and the Machine.

She was a producer of the 2024 Australian musical The Deb, based on the stage musical of the same name, after which she and producers Gregor Cameron and Vince Holden filed suit in California against director Rebel Wilson for defamation.

== Discography ==
=== Singles ===
- "Idol" (2000) - UK number 63
- "Glory Girl" (2000) UK number 90
- "Filthy Mind" (2000) - only released in the U.S./Australia
- "Break My World" (2004) - UK number 52 †
- "Feed" (2004) †
- "Girls Like You" - digital only release (2005)
- "Monster" - digital only release (2005)
- "Blood on the Line" EP (2006)
- "Time Machine" (featuring Boy George) (January 2007)

† Credited to Dark Globe featuring Amanda Ghost

=== Albums ===
- Ghost Stories (2000)
- Blood on the Line - The Download Collection (2008)

=== Songwriting credits ===
Title	Year	Artist(s)	Album	Written with	Sources
"You're Beautiful"	2004	James Blunt	Back to Bedlam	James Blunt, Sacha Skarbek	
"Billy"	2004	James Blunt	Back to Bedlam	James Blunt, Sacha Skarbek	
"Beautiful Liar" (with Shakira)	2006	Beyoncé	B'Day	Beyoncé, Stargate, Ian Dench	
"Flashback"	2006	All Saints	Studio 1	Natalie Appleton, Liam Howlett, Ian Dench	
"Tattoo"	2007	Jordin Sparks	Jordin Sparks	Stargate, Ian Dench	
"Freeze"	2007	Jordin Sparks	Jordin Sparks	Jordin Sparks, Stargate, Ian Dench	
"Virginia Is for Lovers"	2007	Jordin Sparks	Jordin Sparks	Jordin Sparks, Stargate, Ian Dench	
"Disappear"	2008	Beyoncé	I Am... Sasha Fierce	Beyoncé, Hugo, Dave McCracken, Ian Dench	
"Ave Maria"	2008	Beyoncé	I Am... Sasha Fierce	Beyoncé, Ian Dench, Makeba Riddick, Stargate	
"Satellites"	2008	Beyoncé	I Am... Sasha Fierce	Beyoncé, Dave McCracken, Ian Dench	
"Once In a Lifetime"	2008	Beyoncé	Cadillac Records: Music from the Motion Picture	Beyoncé, Ian Dench, Scott McFarnon, James Dring, Jody Street	
"Red"	2009	Daniel Merriweather	Love & War	Ian Dench, Scott McFarnon	
"Gypsy"	2009	Shakira	She Wolf	Shakira, Ian Dench, Carl Sturken and Evan Rogers	
"Give It Up to Me" (featuring Lil Wayne)	2009	Shakira	She Wolf	Shakira, Lil Wayne, Timbaland, J-Roc	
"Fresh Out the Oven" (featuring Pitbull)	2009	Jennifer Lopez	Non-album single	Jennifer Lopez, Pitbull, Pharrell Williams	
"Getting Nowhere" (featuring John Legend)	2010	Magnetic Man	Magnetic Man	John Legend, Skream, Benga, Artwork	
"Untouchable"	2011	Ben Saunders	You Thought You Knew Me By Now	Daniel Merriweather	
"Bedroom Hymns"	2011	Florence and the Machine	Ceremonials	Florence Welch	
"Old Tyme Religion"	2011	Hugo	Old Tyme Religion	Hugo, Ian Dench, Johnny Flynn	
"Born"	2011	Hugo	Old Tyme Religion	Hugo, Ian Dench, Dave McCracken	
"Mekong River Delta"	2011	Hugo	Old Tyme Religion	Hugo, Ian Dench, Dave McCracken	
"Sweetest Cure"	2011	Hugo	Old Tyme Religion	Hugo, Ian Dench, Peter Ibsen	
"Different Lives"	2011	Hugo	Old Tyme Religion	Hugo, Dave McCracken	
"Wake Alone"	2011	Hugo	Old Tyme Religion	Hugo, Darren Lewis, Ian Dench, Tunde Babalola	
"Sunburn"	2012	K.Flay	Eyes Shut	K.Flay, Dave McCracken	
"Only the Horses"	2012	Scissor Sisters	Magic Hour	Jake Shears, Babydaddy, Boys Noize	
"Wasted"	2013	Tony Lucca	With the Whole World Watching	Tony Lucca, Eric Rosse, Ian Dench, Scott McFarnon	
"I Come Apart" (featuring Florence Welch)	2013	ASAP Rocky	Long. Live. ASAP	ASAP Rocky, Florence Welch, Emile Haynie, John Legend	
"Endorphins" (featuring Alex Clare)	2013	Sub Focus	Torus	Sub Focus, Ian Dench, Takura	
"Tidal Wave" (featuring Alpines)	2013	Sub Focus	Torus	Sub Focus, Alpines	
"Astronaut"	2013	Joel Compass	Astronaut	Joel Compass, Ian Dench, Styalz Fuego, The Aston Shuffle	
"The Conversation"	2013	Texas	The Conversation	Sharleen Spiteri, Johnny McElhone, Karen Overton, Ian Dench	
"Break the Fall"	2014	Laura Welsh	Laura Welsh	Laura Welsh, Babydaddy	
"Undiscovered"	2015	Laura Welsh	Fifty Shades of Grey	Laura Welsh, Emile Haynie, Dev Hynes	
"Soft Control"	2015	Laura Welsh	Soft Control	Laura Welsh, Liam Howe	
"God Keeps"	2015	Laura Welsh	Soft Control	Laura Welsh, Emile Haynie, Babydaddy	
"Cold Front"	2015	Laura Welsh	Soft Control	Laura Welsh, Robin Hannibal	
"Breathe Me In"	2015	Laura Welsh	Soft Control	Laura Welsh, Robin Hannibal	
"Hollow Drum"	2015	Laura Welsh	Soft Control	Laura Welsh, Ian Dench	
"Jackson"	2015	Elle King	Love Stuff	Elle King, Dave McCracken, Felipe Aparicio	
"Whole"	2016	Lion Babe	Begin	Lion Babe, Joel Compass	
"Impossible"	2016	Lion Babe	Begin	Lion Babe, Linden Jay, Lewis Jankel, Fred Cox	
"Forever"	2017	Jamie Cullum	The Halcyon (Original Music from the Television Series)	Jamie Cullum, Ian Dench, Joel Compass	
"Invincible"	2017	Jamie Cullum	The Halcyon (Original Music from the Television Series)	Jamie Cullum, Ian Dench, Joel Compass	
"Fires and Flames"	2018	Tinashe	Joyride	Tinashe, Kate Stewart, Joel Compass	
"The One"	2018	Jorja Smith	Lost & Found	Jorja Smith, Joel Compass, Ed Thomas, Kito	
"Measure of a Man" (featuring Central Cee)	2021	FKA Twigs	The King's Man	FKA Twigs, Dominic Lewis, Matthew Margeson, Jamie Hartman, Jane Goldman, John Hill, Matthew Vaughn	
"Papi Bones" (featuring Shygirl)	2022	FKA Twigs	Caprisongs	FKA Twigs, Shygirl, El Guincho, Fakeguido, Jonny Coffer	
"Wanderlust"	2025	FKA Twigs	Eusexua	FKA Twigs, Lewis Roberts, Timmaz Zolleyn, Emile Haynie, Stuart Price, Dougie F. Mark Williams, Raul Cubina, Ed Thomas	

Preceded by Charlie Walk	President; February 2009-December 2010	Succeeded by L.A. Reid
