= Simon Neale =

English radio DJ and producer (born 1977)

Shadow Child
- Also known as: Shadow Child; Dave Spoon; Lovequest; Polymod; M.A.S.C
- Born: Simon Christopher Bird aka Simon Neale; 20 January 1977 (age 49); Portsmouth, Hampshire, England
- Origin: Portsmouth
- Genres: House, deep house, jungle, bass music
- Years active: 2004–present
- Labels: London Records, Food Music, Universal, Dim Mak Records, Toolroom, Size, Dirtybird, Deleted, Moda Black, Apollo, Polydor
- Website: theshadowchild.com

Simon Christopher Bird (born 20 January 1977 in Portsmouth) is an English record producer and DJ. He is often credited as Simon Neale, and is best known by stage names Shadow Child and Dave Spoon. He is a member of the group Lovequest with Doorly and Scissor Sisters frontman Jake Shears and also MASC, a duo formed with Altern 8 musician Mark Archer. From 2022, Bird became a resident on the re-launched Kool FM with his DNA radio show after a 9-year stint on their parent station, Rinse FM. He was also previously part of the line-up on BBC Radio 1's 'In New DJs We Trust'.

== Biography ==
Bird grew up listening to a mixture of synth-pop and early '90s house and rave, and attended a secondary school in 1989 that had a TB-303 and Juno 60 stashed away in the music room cupboard.

After stints running record shops, teaching music production and DJing south-coast clubs in the UK, he established himself as Dave Spoon on the global dance scene, signing his debut 21st Century EP to Toolroom Records in 2004. The piano-led Sunrise EP soon followed and was snapped up by Seamus Haji's Big Love imprint.

In 2006, Spoon released "At Night". With an added vocal in 2007 from Lisa Maffia, the track crossed over as "Bad Girl (At Night)" on Universal, earning Spoon his first top 40 hit, with the second coming in 2008 in the form of "Baditude" with collaborators Sam Obernik and Paul Harris from Dirty Vegas.

He followed this with DJ compilations for Ministry of Sound and Toolroom, remixes of songs by artists like Dizzee Rascal and the Pet Shop Boys, and carved out a global DJ career, including a 2-year residency for Cream in Ibiza. His 2008 single "Baditude" entered the UK Singles Chart at No. 34 on downloads alone on 10 August. The following week, the song climbed to No. 29. His own label at the time, Televizion released the Pete Tong collaboration "Gas Face", which was used as title music for the Hammer Horror film Beyond the Rave. The pair went on to work together on several recordings, including a remix of Robyn and Kleerup's "With Every Heartbeat".

Under the name Shadow Child, he debuted in 2012 with "String Thing" on Dirtybird. He later released the single "23" and remixes for AlunaGeorge and Hot Natured. His work under the Shadow Child alias incorporates elements of deep house, bass music, rave, jungle, and house.

== Discography ==
=== Compilation albums ===
Title	Album details
Collected	Released: 24 November 2013; Label: Food Music, New State Music; Format: CD, digital download, vinyl

=== Extended plays ===
Year	Album	Label
2012	Shadow Child	Dirtybird
2012	Phil Collins	Deleted
2012	23 (featuring Tymer)	Food Music

=== Singles ===
==== As Dave Spoon ====
- 2005 "21st Century"
- 2005 "Front Lounge"
- 2005 "Who You Are"
- 2005 "Sunrise"
- 2005 "Corrupt"
- 2005 "Regeneration"
- 2006 "Afterhours" (featuring Mark Knight)
- 2006 "Outside"
- 2006 "Acid Box"
- 2006 "At Night"
- 2007 "Sylo" (featuring Mark Knight)
- 2007 "Background Noise"
- 2007 "Drum Box"
- 2007 "This Machine" (featuring Penny Foster)
- 2007 "Won't Do It Again (Sunrise)" (featuring Laura Vane)
- 2007 "Bad Girl (At Night)" (featuring Lisa Maffia)
- 2008 "88"
- 2008 "Liability"
- 2008 "Baditude" (featuring Paul Harris of Dirty Vegas & Sam Obernik)
- 2009 "Gas Face" (featuring PeteTong)
- 2009 "Ghost Train" (with DJ Zinc)
- 2009 "Lummox"
- 2009 "The Key"
- 2009 "The Secret"
- 2010 "Impure Imagination" (featuring Nick Corelli) Unreleased

==== As Shadow Child ====
- 2012 "String Thing" Shadow Child EP [Dirty Bird]
- 2012 "Rustic Chip" [Dirty Bird] (Shadow Child EP)
- 2012 "The Verdict" [Free Giveaway]
- 2012 "So High" [Moda Black]
- 2012 "Bordertown" (with Horx featuring TK Wonder) [Apollo/R&S]
- 2012 "Comb Over" (with James Talk) [Dirty Bird]
- 2012 "Phil Collins" EP [Deleted]
- 2012 "23" EP [Food Music]
- 2012 "Sensible Haircut" [Food Music] (23 EP)
- 2012 "The Verdict Pt 2" [Food Music] (23 EP)
- 2013 "The Only One" [Dirty Bird]
- 2013 "Friday" (featuring Takura) [Food Music]
- 2014 "Steak Fingers" [Free Giveaway]
- 2014 "Climbin'" (with Doorly)

==== As Avec ====
- 2013 "Disappearer" (featuring Jake Shears)

=== Other appearances ===
Year	Song	Album	Label
2012	"Comb Over" (with James Talk)	BBQ Trax	Dirtybird
2013	"The Only One"	Dirtybird Players Part 1	Dirtybird
2013	"Bending Albert's Law" (vs. Karin Park)	Moda Black Vol. 2	Moda Black

=== Remixes ===
==== As Dave Spoon ====
- 2005 DJ Philippe B – "Step 2gether" (Dave Spoon Remix) [Plasmapool]
- 2005 Southside Hustlers ft. Abigail Bailey – "Right Before My Eyes" [Toolroom]
- 2005 Sueno Soul – "A Better Love" (Dave Spoon Remix) [Stealth]
- 2005 Juke Joint – "Melody of the Mouth" (Dave Spoon Remix) [Big Love]
- 2005 Haji & Emmanuel – "Take Me Away" (Dave Spoon Remix) [Big Love]
- 2006 Robbie Rivera – "Bizarre Love Triangle" (Dave Spoon Remix) [Juicy Music]
- 2006 S & V – "King Coaster" (Dave Spoon Remix) [Mono-Type]
- 2006 The Timewriter "Reachin' Out" (Dave Spoon Remix) [Plastic City]
- 2006 Arno Cost – "Magenta" (Dave Spoon Remix) [CR2]
- 2006 Beta Blokka – "Beta Blokka" (Dave Spoon Remix) [Punchfunk]
- 2006 Dagaard & Morane – "Keep on Doing It" (Dave Spoon Remix) [Born To Dance]
- 2006 Danny Freakaziod – "You Are The Leading Man" (Dave Spoon Remix) [CR2]
- 2006 Antoine Clamaran – "Take Off" (Dave Spoon Remix) [Plasmapool]
- 2006 Tyken ft. Awa – "Every Word" (Dave Spoon Remix) [Hed Kandi]
- 2006 The Officials – "Music" (Dave Spoon Remix) [Sequential]
- 2006 Golden Girls – "Kinetic" (Dave Spoon & TV Rock Remix)
- 2007 Vorsprung – "Worth The Wait" (Dave Spoon Remix) [Brickhouse]
- 2007 Paul van Dyk ft. Jessica Sutta – "White Lies" (Dave Spoon Remix) [Positiva]
- 2007 Bump – "I'm Rushin" (Dave Spoon Remix) [Art & Craft]
- 2007 Gat Decor – "Passion" (Dave Spoon Remix) [Addictive]
- 2007 Gold, Diaz & Young Rebels – "Don't You Want Me" (Dave Spoon Remix) [Joia]
- 2007 Ethan – "In My Heart" (Dave Spoon Remix) [Art & Craft]
- 2007 Robyn with Kleerup – "With Every Heartbeat" (Tong & Spoon Wonderland mix) [Konichiwa]
- 2007 D.O.N.S. – "Big Fun" (Dave Spoon Remix) [Hed Kandi]
- 2007 Funkagenda – "San Francisco" (Dave Spoon Remix) [Toolroom]
- 2007 Kharma 45 – "Political Soul" (Dave Spoon Remix) [EMI]
- 2007 Liquid – "Sweet Harmony" (Dave Spoon Remix) [GI]
- 2007 Richard Grey – "Warped Bass" (Dave Spoon Remix) [Apollo]
- 2007 Andrea Doria & LXR – "Freak Me" (Dave Spoon Remix) [Hed Kandi]
- 2007 Cedric Gervais – "Spirit in My Life" (Dave Spoon Remix) [Data]
- 2007 Dave Lee – "Latronica" (Dave Spoon Remix) [Z records]
- 2007 Dizzee Rascal – "Flex" (Dave Spoon Reflex) [XL Recordings]
- 2008 Pet Shop Boys – "Integral" (Dave Spoon Remix) [EMI]
- 2008 James Blunt – "1973" (Tong & Spoon Wonderland Mix) [Warner]
- 2008 Kaz James – "All Fall Down" (Dave Spoon Remix) [Sony]
- 2008 Alphabeat – "Boyfriend" (Dave Spoon Remix) [Chrysalis]
- 2008 The Presets – "Talk Like That" (Dave Spoon Televised Remix) [Modular]
- 2008 Madonna – "Give It 2 Me" (Tong & Spoon Wonderland mix) [Warner. Bros]
- 2009 Cagedbaby – "Forced" (Dave Spoon Remix) [Southern Fried]
- 2009 Sour Grapes – "Kharma" (Dave Spoon Remix) [Television]
- 2009 Killa Kella – "Built Like An Amplifier" (Dave Spoon Remix) [100%]
- 2009 Chase & Status feat. Kano – "Against All Odds" (Dave Spoon Remix) [RAM]
- 2009 The Ting Tings – "Fruit Machine" (Dave Spoon Remix) [Columbia]
- 2009 Calvin Harris – "Ready for the Weekend" (Dave Spoon Remix) [Sony]
- 2009 VV Brown – "Game Over" (Dave Spoon Remix) [Island]
- 2009 Mr Hudson – "White Lies" (Dave Spoon Remix) [Mercury]
- 2009 Beyoncé – "Sweet Dreams" (Dave Spoon Remix) [Columbia]
- 2010 Labrinth – "Let the Sun Shine" (Dave Spoon Remix) [Syco/Sony]

==== As Shadow Child ====
- 2012 Kid Kombat – "Chinga" (Shadow Child Remix) [Television]
- 2012 Hardrive – "Deep Inside" (Shadow Child Remix) [Strictly Rhythm]
- 2012 Hadouken! – "Parasite" (Shadow Child Remix) [Ministry of Sound]
- 2012 Drumsound & Bassline Smith featuring Tom Cane – "Through the Night" (Shadow Child Remix)[New State Music]
- 2012 S.K.A.M – "I Got What You Need" (Shadow Child Remix) [ALiVE]
- 2012 Pedro Mercado & Kerada – "Behind the Sun" (Shadow Child Remix) [Gold/Kling Klong]
- 2012 Zombie Disco Squad – "Ibiza Hooligan" (Shadow Child Remix) [Made To Play]
- 2012 The House Crew – "Keep the Fire Burning" (Shadow Child Remix)
- 2012 Miguel Campbell – "Rockin Beats" (Shadow Child Remix) [Hot Creations]
- 2012 A-Trak & Zinc featuring Natalie Storm – "Like the Dancefloor" (Shadow Child Remix) [Fool's Gold Records]
- 2012 The xx – "Angels" (Shadow Child Bootleg)
- 2012 Sub Focus featuring Alpines – "Tidal Wave" (Shadow Child Remix) [RAM Records]
- 2012 Zoe Xenia & Cari Lekebusch – "Good Love" (Shadow Child Remix) [Kling Klong]
- 2012 The Other Tribe – "Sing with Your Feet" (Shadow Child Remix)
- 2012 Justin Martin & Leroy Peppers – "Riding Spaceships"(Shadow Child Remix) [Dirtybird]
- 2012 Hot Since 82 – "Knee Deep in Louise"(Shadow Child Remix) [Moda Black]
- 2013 Delphic – "Baiya" (Shadow Child Remix) [Polydor]
- 2013 Lianne La Havas – "Elusive" (Shadow Child Remix) [Warner]
- 2013 Alix Perez featuring Sam Willis – "Annie's Song" (Shadow Child Remix) [Shogun Audio]
- 2013 Hot Natured featuring Anabel Englund – "Reverse Skydiving" (Shadow Child Remix) [FFRR/Warner]
- 2013 Movement – "Feel Real" (Shadow Child Remix) [Club Mod]
- 2013 Yousef featuring Charli Taft – "I See" (Shadow Child Remix) [Defected]
- 2013 London Grammar – "Strong"(Shadow Child Remix) [Metal & Dust]
- 2013 Javeon – "Lovesong" (Shadow Child Remix) [PMR Records]
- 2013 AlunaGeorge – "Best Be Believing" (Shadow Child Remix) [Island]
- 2014 Marlon Hoffstadt & Dansson – "Shake That" (Shadow Child Remix) [FFRR/Parlophone]
- 2014 Lena Cullen – "Timeless" (Shadow Child Remix) [Food Music]
- 2014 Example – "One More Day (Stay with Me)" (Shadow Child Remix) [Epic Records UK/Sony]
- 2014 Duke Dumont – "Won't Look Back" (Shadow Child Remix) [Adam Dyment/Virgin EMI]
- 2016 Jaydee – "Plastic Dreams" (Shadow Child Remix)
