= Evolve (Sub Focus album) =

Studio album by Sub Focus
- Released: 12 May 2023
- Studio: Tileyard (London)
- Genre: Drum and bass
- Length: 53:19
- Label: EMI
- Producer: Sub Focus

Sub Focus chronology
Portals (2020)	Evolve (2023)	Contact (2025)

Evolve is the third solo studio album by British DJ and record producer Sub Focus, released on 12 May 2023 through EMI Records. It was supported by the UK top-40 single "Ready to Fly", a collaboration with English DJ Dimension, which was also certified silver by the British Phonographic Industry (BPI).

== Background and artwork ==
Sub Focus stated that his intention was to "channel elements of [his] musical evolution over the course of this album", particularly his 1990s influences and "dance acts that introduced [him] to electronic music like The Chemical Brothers through to the early hardcore and jungle music [he] was discovering back then". He also expressed that he "wanted to make an album that speaks to [his] D&B core, with breakbeats laced through every track as a backbone".

The cover was made by AI after Mat Maitland and Claudia Raphael from design agency Big Active and Sub Focus put close-up photos of nudibranchs, a type of brightly coloured sea slug, into an AI generator.

== Commercial performance ==
The album is Sub Focus's second-highest charting on the UK Albums Chart, debuting and peaking at number 33 and staying on the chart for two weeks. The album was most commercially successful in New Zealand, where it debuted at number eight and charted for 15 weeks.

== Track listing ==
Evolve track listing
No.	Title	Length
1.	"Trip" (with Metrik)	4:31
2.	"Calling for a Sign" (featuring Kelli-Leigh)	3:51
3.	"Fine Day"	3:52
4.	"Vibration (One More Time)" (featuring AR/CO)	4:02
5.	"It's Time" (with Gene Farris)	3:19
6.	"Ready to Fly" (with Dimension)	3:25
7.	"Alarm" (with MC ID)	3:07
8.	"Off the Ground"	4:02
9.	"Waiting" (with Pola & Bryson featuring Kelli-Leigh)	3:51
10.	"I Found You" (featuring Hayla)	2:56
11.	"Secrets" (with CamelPhat and Culture Shock featuring Rhodes)	5:10
12.	"Overcome" (featuring Frances)	2:56
13.	"Don't Want to Come Down" (featuring Lowes)	3:53
14.	"Turn Up the Bass" (featuring Jonny L)	4:24
Total length:		53:19

== Charts ==
Chart performance for Evolve
Chart (2023)	Peak position
New Zealand Albums (RMNZ)	8
UK Albums (Official Charts)	33
UK Dance Albums (Official Charts)	3

== Certifications ==
Certifications for Evolve
Region	Certification	Certified units/sales
United Kingdom (BPI)	Silver	60,000^{‡}
^{‡} Sales+streaming figures based on certification alone.
