= Bryn Christopher =

British singer and songwriter (born 1985)

- Also known as: Skaar
- Born: 8 November 1985 (age 40); Great Barr, Birmingham, England
- Genres: Soul; R&B
- Occupations: Singer; songwriter
- Instrument: Vocals
- Years active: 1997–present
- Labels: Polydor (2008–09); Geffen (2009–present)

Bryn Christopher (born 8 November 1985) is a British singer and songwriter, and the frontman of electronic music group I See Monstas. Born in Great Barr, Birmingham, England, . His debut single, "The Quest", was featured in the TV series Grey's Anatomy.

== Musical career ==
=== Early years ===
Christopher was the support slot on the Amy Winehouse tour at the end of 2007, while he was still relatively unknown (he also supported U.S. soul artist Rahsaan Patterson at London's Jazz Café). He has been picked up by the U.S. agency William Morris Agency. He also co-wrote the Leon Jackson hit song "Don't Call This Love" with British producer/writer Chris Braide. Christopher was also the opening act for Mary J. Blige on her European tour 'Growing Pains' in 2008.

=== "The Quest" ===
Christopher's first single release, "The Quest", was released on 8 June 2008 through Polydor Records. The single draws on his brother's personal experience as a soldier stationed in Basra. His brother two years later would be injured in Afghanistan losing both of his legs. "The Quest" was featured in the closing scene of Grey's Anatomy's season 4 conclusion, which caused the song to become more known in the US. The song was made into a music video for the show to promote its fifth season, with scenes of Christopher singing in London as well as scenes from the show. The song was also featured in an episode of the BBC school-based drama Waterloo Road.

It was also covered by Grigory Leps in Russian which became a popular version.

Christopher teamed up with co-writer/producer Jarrad Rogers and production team Midi Mafia to produce his debut album My World, which was released September 2008. Midi Mafia secured the exclusive rights to use samples from the Stax Records Catalogue, and has used some of these for the first time ever on Christopher's album.

His second single, "Smilin" was released on 2 September 2008. It peaked at No. 31. His third single "Fearless" was released on 18 January 2009 and failed to chart. His final single was "Taken Me Over", released on 4 August 2009 as a digital-only single. It also failed to chart.

Christopher then left Polydor, and signed with Geffen Records UK.

=== Festival appearances ===
Christopher hosted a residency at North London's live spot The Boogaloo throughout April 2007, and followed this with dates at London's Soho Revue Bar. He has also played at 2008's Wireless Festival in Hyde Park on the same day as Jay-Z, as well as Glastonbury, T in the Park, Oxegen and V Festival. Christopher has also appeared at the Capital Summertime and Jingle Bell Ball's as the vocalist of Sigala's "Sweet Lovin'"; he also has appeared at V Festival and appeared in many other places during 2015–2017.

=== 2010–present ===
Christopher co-wrote the Sub Focus song "Out the Blue", which was released 27 April 2012. He co-wrote and provided uncredited vocals for "Superstar" by Knife Party, from their debut album Abandon Ship (2014). In 2015, he was a featured artist and co-wrote the song "City Lights" by Culture Shock. He also worked with Sigala on the track "Sweet Lovin'", a tropical house track that has over 245 million hits on YouTube (as of October 2021) and reached number three on the UK Singles Chart. He also wrote "Came Here for Love" by Sigala and Ella Eyre with White N3rd and Klingande, which reached number 6 on the UK Singles Chart and was the official London gay pride theme.

== I See Monstas ==
In 2012, Christopher, under the pseudonym Skaar, joined producers Rocky and Rufio to form an electronic music group called MONSTA (subsequently renamed I See Monstas in 2013). The group charted at No. 48 in the UK with their first single "Holdin' On".

== Discography ==
=== Studio albums ===
Year	Album details	Chart positions
Year	Album details	UK
2008	My World: Released: 8 September 2008; Label: Polydor; Formats: CD, digital download	18

=== Singles ===
==== As lead artist ====
Year	Song	Peak chart positions		Album
Year	Song	UK	GRE	Album
2008	"The Quest"	45	2	My World
2008	"Smilin"	31	—	My World
2009	"Fearless"	—	—	My World
2009	"Taken Me Over"^{[A]}	—	—	My World
2021	"Never Love You Again" (with Cheat Codes and Little Big Town)	—	—	One Night in Nashville
"—" denotes a recording that did not chart or was not released.

Notes

- A "Taken Me Over" was released as a digital download single.

==== As featured artist ====
Title	Year	Peak chart positions										Certifications	Album
Title	Year	UK	AUS	AUT	FRA	GER	IRE	NLD	SCO	SWE	SWI	Certifications	Album
"City Lights" (Culture Shock featuring Bryn Christopher)	2015	—	—	—	—	—	—	—	—	—	—		Non-album single
"Sweet Lovin'" (Sigala featuring Bryn Christopher)	2015	3	11	7	115	15	6	23	1	29	31	BPI: 2× Platinum; ARIA: Platinum; BVMI: Gold; RMNZ: Gold	Brighter Days
"Me, Myself & I" (Blonde featuring Bryn Christopher)	2018	—	—	—	—	—	—	—	—	—	—		Non-album singles
"All Around the World" (Matoma featuring Bryn Christopher)	2019	—	—	—	—	—	—	—	—	—	—		Non-album singles
"No Therapy" (Felix Jaehn featuring Nea and Bryn Christopher)	2020	—	—	—	—	—	56	—	—	—	—		Breathe
"Unconditional" (Dillon Francis and 220 Kid featuring Bryn Christpher)	2021	—	—	—	—	—	—	—	—	—	—		Happy Machine
"—" denotes a recording that did not chart or was not released.

2024

Hit me up - Jodie harsh featuring Bryn Christopher

=== Other appearances ===
Year	Song	Album
2014	"Superstar" (by Knife Party, uncredited vocals)	Abandon Ship
2015	"Mine" (Kill the Noise featuring Bryn Christopher)	Occult Classic
2015	"Deeper Love" (Botnek & I See MONSTAS featuring Bryn Christopher, uncredited; a part of I See MONSTAS), Released on Monstercat.	Single

=== Songwriting credits ===
Year	Artist	Album	Song	Co-written with
2008	Leon Jackson	Right Now	"Don't Call This Love"	Christopher Braide, Carl Falk
2011	The Saturdays	On Your Radar	"Do What You Want With Me"	Jarrad Rogers
2012	Sub Focus	Torus	"Out the Blue" feat. Alice Gold	Nicholas Douwma, Alice McLaughlin
2012	Alexandra Burke	Heartbreak on Hold	"Devil in Me"	Peter Boxta Martin
2015	Andrea Faustini	Kelly	"Kelly"	Matthew Prime, Timothy Woodcock
2015	Kill the Noise	Occult Classic	"Mine" feat. Bryn Christopher	Jacob Stanczak, Kenneth Walker
2015	Sigala	Brighter Days	"Sweet Lovin'" feat. Bryn Christopher	Bruce Fielder
2016	Mat Zo	Self Assemble	"Sinful" feat. I See Monstas	Matan Zohar, Rocky Morris, Rufio Sandilands
2017	Sigala	Brighter Days	"Came Here for Love" with Ella Eyre	Bruce Fielder, Cedric Steinmyller, Scott Wild, Ella McMahon
2018	The Vamps	Night & Day	"Too Good to Be You" with Danny Ávila	Philip Plested, George Tizzard, Richard Parkhouse, Colson Baker
2018	Jamie Talbot	Non-album single	"Goldmine"	Jonatan Gusmark, Ludvig Evers, Karen Poole
2018	Blonde	Non-album single	"Me, Myself & I" feat. Bryn Christopher	Adam Eaglefield, Jacob Manson, Ashley Milton, Daniel Goudie
2019	Blithe	Don't Blink EP	"Don't Blink"	Rhiann Pitter, Fridolin Walcher
2019	Louis Tomlinson	Walls	"Two of Us"	Louis Tomlinson, Andrew Jackson, Duck Blackwell
2019	Matoma	Non-album single	"All Around the World" feat. Bryn Christopher	Thomas Lagergren, Andrew Jackson, Matthew Zara
2019	Nea	Some Say EP	"Some Say"	Linnea Sodahl, Vincint Kottkamp, Hitimpulse
2019	Blithe	Non-album single	"Becoming You"	Rhiann Pitter, Fridolin Walcher
2019	Fleur East	Fearless	"Size"	Fleur East, Chiara Hunter, Tre Jean-Marie, Jacob Attwooll
2020	Melanie C	Melanie C	"Who I Am"	Melanie Chrisholm, Ash Howes, Richard Stannard
2020	Matoma	RYTME EP	"Don't Stop the Rhythm" feat. Bryn Christopher	Thomas Lagergren, Andrew Bullimore, Matthew Zara
2020	Felix Jaehn	Non-album single	"No Therapy" feat. Nea and Bryn Christopher	Felix Jaehn, Robbie McDade, Linnea Sodahl, Vincint Kottkamp, Hitimpulse
2020	Hotel Supernova	Non-album single	"Rhythm & Lights" feat. Bryn Christopher	Edward Burrows, Michael Kintish
2022	Tomorrow X Together	Minisode 2: Thursday's Child	"Opening Sequence"	Koda, Sam Klempner, Supreme Boi, Slow Rabbit, Lee Seu-ran, Huening Kai, January 8, Taehyun, Danke, Yi Yi-jin
