= Turn Back Time (Sub Focus song) =

Single by Sub Focus

from the album Torus
- B-side: Metrik remix; Special Request remix
- Released: 20 December 2013
- Genre: Electro house; rave
- Length: 3:25 (radio edit); 5:07 (album version)
- Label: Virgin EMI; Mercury; RAM
- Songwriters: Nick Douwma; Yolanda Quartey; Todd Terry; Kim English; Frankie Feliciano
- Producer: Sub Focus

Sub Focus singles chronology
| "Turn It Around" (2013) | "Turn Back Time" (2013) | "Close" (2014) |

Music video
- "Turn Back Time" on YouTube

"Turn Back Time" is a song by British DJ and record producer Sub Focus, featuring uncredited vocals from British singer Yola. It was released independently on 20 December 2013 as the sixth single from his second studio album Torus. However, the song charted prior to independent release and continued to rise, peaking at number 10 on the UK Singles Chart for the week of 25 January 2014. Along with "Endorphins", it is his joint highest-charting single to date.

== Background and release ==
"Turn Back Time" was one of the last songs to be finished on Torus. At the time he was experimenting with 90's rave samples and the song originally used a Todd Terry sample but was re-recorded with session vocalist Yolanda Quartey and worked into a new song. The song contains elements of the composition "Brass Disk", as written by Todd Terry and performed by Duprée, and lyrics from the song "Missing You", as performed by Kim English and produced by Frankie Feliciano. It is a fan favourite during his live sets, and one of the few songs that he uses the smoke machine during. The track received a surge in popularity upon the album release and entered the UK Singles Chart, working its way up to number 85 and then later number 35, number 15 and eventually number 10 on the UK Singles Chart.

== Music video ==
An official video to accompany the release of the single was premiered on YouTube on 19 December 2013, at a total duration of three minutes and fifty-eight seconds.

== Track listing ==
Digital download
| No. | Title | Length |
|---|---|---|
| 1. | "Turn Back Time" (radio edit) | 3:30 |
| 2. | "Turn Back Time" (Special Request remix) | 5:40 |
| 3. | "Turn Back Time" (Metrik remix) | 4:14 |
| 4. | "Turn Back Time" (Bro Safari and ETC!ETC! remix) | 4:08 |

12" vinyl
| No. | Title | Length |
|---|---|---|
| 1. | "Turn Back Time" (Metrik remix) |
| 2. | "Turn Back Time" (Special Request remix) |

== Credits and personnel ==
Credits adapted from vinyl release.

- Vocals – Yolanda Quartey
- Writers – Todd Terry, Kim English, Frankie Feliciano
- Producer – Nick Douwma
- Label – Virgin EMI Records, Mercury Records, RAM Records

== Charts and certifications ==
=== Charts ===
| Chart (2013–14) | Peak position |
|---|---|
| Belgium (Ultratip Bubbling Under Flanders) | 13 |
| Ireland (IRMA) | 58 |
| Scottish Singles Sales (Official Charts) | 9 |
| UK Dance (Official Charts) | 3 |
| UK Singles (Official Charts) | 10 |

=== Certifications ===
| Region | Certification | Certified units/sales |
|---|---|---|
| United Kingdom (BPI) | Silver | 200,000^{‡} |
^{‡} Sales+streaming figures based on certification alone.

== Release history ==
| Country | Release date | Format | Label |
|---|---|---|---|
| Worldwide | 20 December 2013 | Digital download | Virgin EMI; Mercury |
| Worldwide | 23 December 2013 | 12" | RAM |
