= The Cheek =

UK musical group

- Also known as: Cheeky Cheeky and the Nosebleeds
- Origin: Woodbridge, England
- Genres: Indie Rock/Pop
- Years active: 2007–present
- Members: Rory Cottam – Vocals; Charlie Dobney – Guitar & Vocals; Thom Hobson – Bass; Christian Daniels – Guitar; Ali Bartlett – Drums
- Website: Official MySpace

The Cheek (formerly known as Cheeky Cheeky and the Nosebleeds) are an indie pop band from Woodbridge, Suffolk. Having released several singles and an EP, they released their debut album "Lover's Quarrel" in 2014.

== History ==
The band was first started in Suffolk under the name Cheeky Cheeky and the Nosebleeds. The band consists of the members Charlie Dobney, Christian Daniels, Ali Bartlett, Thom Hobson, and Rory Cottam. Their debut "Slow Kids", released on 17 March 2008, received a positive reception, catching the attention of Huw Stephens, NME and Q magazine. Following the success of Slow Kids, the band went on to release the single "You Let Me Go", which was reviewed by NME, receiving 4/5 from Dan Martin.

During 2008, Cheeky Cheeky and the Nosebleeds performed at several festivals including Latitude, Glastonbury, Harvest at Jimmy's, and Underage Festival. Their headline set at Latitude's Lake Stage saw a record number of crowd surfers and drew one of the largest crowds for the stage. Following their popularity at London's Underage festival, the band were approached again to do an Underage Christmas Special at London Scala on 20 December. Their debut headlining tour covered 29 dates in 31 days including a special Halloween show at the Borderline and in December supported Iglu and Hartley on their UK Tour.

2009 was a successful year for the band as they played shows in Japan, played again at the Latitude festival, and at SXSW in Texas. It was during their NME Awards Show on 17 February that the band announced their name change to The Cheek stating, "It takes about two seconds to say 'Cheeky Cheeky And The Nosebleeds', and we say our band name sometimes 20 times a day. That's like four-and-a-half minutes every week. More than four hours a year. We're getting an extra three hours a year back just by becoming "The Cheek"."

They went on to release a limited Japanese EP on 24 February, "Thespionage" which featured a series of previous unreleased tracks the band recorded during various sessions as CCATNB.

Following a series of popular live performances, CCATNB caught the attention of some established record labels, which soon let to them signing a deal with A&M Records. During the recording of their debut album a change in musical direction began. This happening led to the change in name to 'The Cheek' and along with it a host of new songs.

After the mixing and mastering process, the album was complete and ready for print, however, A&M pulled the plug on everything and the band was dropped in 2010.

After much delay, their debut album Lover's Quarrel was released in 2014.

== Debut album ==
The band spent two separate sessions during January and June 2009 recording their debut album at ICP Studios in Belgium. It was produced by White Lies and Pulp collaborator, Ed Buller. Several album previews and demos appeared on the band's Myspace player during this time. Hung Up also appeared with the announcement that the song will be their third single but first as "The Cheek".

Hung Up was officially released later that year on 9 November on 7" and download.

The album remains fully recorded mixed and mastered yet unreleased, only being heard by a handful of people. Its name is not known, but rumour has it that it was going to be 'Lover's Quarrel'. What can be confirmed is that Roxy Music legend Andy Mackay features on saxophone.

== Discography ==
=== LP ===
- Lover's Quarrel (2014)

=== Singles ===
- "Slow Kids" (2008)
- "You Let Me Go" (2008)
- "Hung Up" (2009)
- "Just One Night" (2010)

=== EP ===
- "Thespionage" (2009)
