= Falling Down (Sub Focus song) =

Single by Sub Focus featuring Kenzie May

from the album Torus
- Released: 1 January 2012
- Recorded: 2011
- Genre: Dubstep
- Length: 5:09 (original mix); 3:46 (radio edit)
- Label: RAM; Mercury; Owsla
- Songwriters: Nick Douwma; Kenzie May; Thomas Havelock
- Producer: Sub Focus

Sub Focus singles chronology
"Flashing Lights" (2011)	"Falling Down" (2012)	"Out the Blue" (2012)

Kenzie May singles chronology
"Falling Down" (2011)	"Hide & Seek" (2013)

Music video
- "Falling Down" on YouTube

"Falling Down" is a song by British DJ and record producer Sub Focus, featuring vocals from Boston-born and London-raised singer Kenzie May. Originally previewed through Douwma' SoundCloud page on 14 December 2011, it was released as a free digital download on 1 January 2012 through RAM Records and Mercury Records. The song became the first single of Sub Focus' second studio album Torus. On 15 May 2012, the single was re-released as an EP through Owsla alongside remixes from Nick Thayer, xKore and Sub Focus himself. The VIP also features on the deluxe edition of Torus.

== Background and release ==
The synth hook on "Falling Down" was originally intended for the Chase & Status and Takura collaboration "Flashing Lights" but didn't fit the song so was re-used as a starting point for the new song. While the track was being finished, Skrillex coincidentally visited the studios to meet Caspa and Douwma showed him the track. Skrillex enjoyed it and decided to release it on Owsla.

== Track listing ==
Digital download – single
No.	Title	Length
1.	"Falling Down" (featuring Kenzie May)	5:09
2.	"Falling Down" (featuring Kenzie May) (radio edit)	3:46

Digital download – EP
No.	Title	Length
1.	"Falling Down" (featuring Kenzie May) (original mix)	5:08
2.	"Falling Down" (featuring Kenzie May) (VIP)	4:36
3.	"Falling Down" (featuring Kenzie May) (xKore remix)	4:52
4.	"Falling Down" (featuring Kenzie May) (Nick Thayer remix)	4:33

== Credits and personnel ==
- Vocals, writer – Kenzie May
- Producer, programming – Nick Douwma
- Writer – Thomas "Tom Cane" Havelock
- Label – RAM Records, Mercury Records, Owsla

== Release history ==
Region	Date	Format	Label
Worldwide	1 January 2012	Free digital download (single)	RAM; Mercury
Worldwide	15 May 2012	Digital download (EP)	Owsla
