= Tidal Wave (song) =

Single by Sub Focus featuring Alpines

from the album Torus
- B-side: "Tidal Wave" (KillSonik remix)
- Released: 4 November 2012
- Recorded: 2011
- Genre: Drumstep; drum and bass
- Length: 3:46
- Label: Virgin EMI; Mercury; RAM
- Songwriters: Nick Douwma; Amanda Ghost; Catherine Pockson; Robert Matthews
- Producer: Sub Focus

Sub Focus singles chronology
"Out the Blue" (2012)	"Tidal Wave" (2012)	"Endorphins" (2013)

Alpines singles chronology
"Empire" (2012)	"Tidal Wave" (2012)	"Lights" (2013)

Music video
- "Tidal Wave" on YouTube

"Tidal Wave" is the third single by British DJ and record producer Sub Focus to be released from his second studio album Torus. The song features vocals from Alpines. The song peaked at number 12 on the UK Singles Chart and number four on the UK Dance Chart, making it his highest-charting single until "Endorphins" and "Turn Back Time", which both peaked at number 10 on the UK Singles Chart. It is still his highest-charting single on the UK Dance Chart and his biggest-selling single.

== Music video ==
A music video to accompany the release of "Tidal Wave" was first released onto YouTube on 10 October 2012 at a total length of three minutes and fifty-two seconds. It is set on a rocky coastline (similar to the single cover) and features Catherine Pockson of Alpines singing in the video. The beach is El Matador, close to Los Angeles, United States.

== Track listing ==
Digital download
No.	Title	Length
1.	"Tidal Wave" (featuring Alpines)	3:46
2.	"Tidal Wave" (featuring Alpines) (Chuckie remix)	5:20
3.	"Tidal Wave" (featuring Alpines) (KillSonik remix)	4:57
4.	"Tidal Wave" (featuring Alpines) (Flosstradamus remix)	4:09
5.	"Tidal Wave" (featuring Alpines) (Shadow Child remix)	6:27

12" vinyl
No.	Title	Length
1.	"Tidal Wave" (featuring Alpines)	3:46
2.	"Tidal Wave" (featuring Alpines) (KillSonik remix)	4:57

== Charts ==
=== Weekly ===
Chart (2012)	Peak position
Belgium (Ultratip Bubbling Under Flanders)	15
Belgium Dance (Ultratop Flanders)	16
Scotland Singles (Official Charts)	15
Slovakia Airplay (ČNS IFPI)	78
UK Singles (Official Charts)	12
UK Dance (Official Charts)	4
US Hot Dance/Electronic Songs (Billboard)	43

=== Year-end ===
Chart (2012)	Position
UK Singles (OCC)	192

== Certifications ==
Region	Certification	Certified units/sales
New Zealand (RMNZ)	Platinum	30,000^{‡}
United Kingdom (BPI)	Platinum	600,000^{‡}
^{‡} Sales+streaming figures based on certification alone.

== Release history ==
Region	Date	Format	Label
United Kingdom	4 November 2012	12"; digital download	Virgin EMI; Mercury; RAM
