= Organ (album) =

2021 album by Dimension

Studio album by Dimension
- Released: 5 March 2021
- Genre: Drum and bass
- Length: 66:46
- Label: Warner; ADA

Organ is the debut studio album by British drum and bass DJ and record producer Dimension, released in March 2021. The album was a commercial success in New Zealand, reaching number six.

== Production ==
Dimension decided to release a formal studio album, as he felt more self-assured as a musician, and to create a work that delves deeper into his musical sound. At the time of release, nine of the album's 17 tracks were released as singles.

== Track listing ==
Organ track listing
No.	Title	Length
1.	"Saviour" (featuring Sharlene Hector)	3:22
2.	"Alive" (featuring Poppy Baskcomb)	4:08
3.	"Danger" (featuring MC GQ)	3:02
4.	"Devotion" (featuring Cameron Hayes)	3:10
5.	"Psycho"	2:41
6.	"Remedy" (featuring TS Graye)	3:20
7.	"UK Border Patrol"	4:25
8.	"Organ"	4:35
9.	"Altar"	4:09
10.	"Love to Give" (with Culture Shock and Billy Lockett)	3:22
11.	"Domino"	4:38
12.	"Offender"	3:43
13.	"Lord's Prayer" (featuring Liam Bailey)	5:14
14.	"Plus Minus" (featuring Arctic Lake)	4:41
15.	"Hatred" (featuring E11E)	3:44
16.	"Desire" (with Sub Focus)	3:35
17.	"Sensory Division"	4:57
Total length:		66:46

== Charts ==
=== Weekly charts ===
Weekly chart performance for Organ
Chart (2021)	Peak position
New Zealand Albums (RMNZ)	6
UK Albums (OCC)	65

=== Year-end charts ===
Year-end chart performance for Organ
Chart (2021)	Position
New Zealand Albums (RMNZ)	45
