= Out the Blue (Sub Focus song) =

Single by Sub Focus featuring Alice Gold

from the album Torus
- B-side: "Out the Blue" (Xilent remix)
- Released: 27 April 2012
- Recorded: 2010–12
- Genre: Drum and bass; chiptune
- Length: 3:18
- Label: Virgin EMI; Mercury; RAM
- Songwriters: Nick Douwma; Alice McLaughlin; Bryn Christopher
- Producer: Sub Focus

Sub Focus singles chronology
| "Falling Down" (2012) | "Out the Blue" (2012) | "Tidal Wave" (2012) |

Music video
- "Out the Blue" on YouTube

"Out the Blue" is the second single by British DJ and record producer Sub Focus to be released from his second studio album Torus. The song features vocals from English singer Alice Gold. The song was Sub Focus's highest-charting single until the release of "Tidal Wave".

== Background and release ==
Douwma wrote the song in mid-2010 and worked with several vocalists on demo versions of the song. During many DJ sets, including the Ultra Music Festival in 2011, he played a version of the song, featuring a vocoded vocal sample. The demo versions of the song also feature a variation in the melody that was cut out of the final version. Eventually, Alice Gold recorded the version that Douwma would go on to release as a single.

== Music video ==
A music video to accompany the release of "Out the Blue" was first released onto YouTube on 2 April 2012 at a total length of three minutes and twenty-eight seconds.

== Track listing ==
Digital download
| No. | Title | Length |
|---|---|---|
| 1. | "Out the Blue" (featuring Alice Gold) (radio edit) | 3:18 |
| 2. | "Out the Blue" (featuring Alice Gold) (club mix) | 4:35 |
| 3. | "Out the Blue" (featuring Alice Gold) (Laidback Luke remix) | 5:54 |
| 4. | "Out the Blue" (featuring Alice Gold) (Xilent remix) | 5:02 |
| 5. | "Out the Blue" (featuring Alice Gold) (xxxy remix) | 4:52 |

12" vinyl
| No. | Title | Length |
|---|---|---|
| 1. | "Out the Blue" (featuring Alice Gold) | 4:35 |
| 2. | "Out the Blue" (featuring Alice Gold) (Xilent remix) | 5:02 |

== Chart performance ==
| Chart (2012) | Peak position |
|---|---|
| Scotland Singles (Official Charts) | 28 |
| UK Dance (Official Charts) | 5 |
| UK Singles (Official Charts) | 23 |

== Release history ==
| Region | Date | Format | Label |
|---|---|---|---|
| United Kingdom | 27 April 2012 | 12"; digital download | Virgin EMI; Mercury; RAM |
