= Flashing Lights (Chase & Status and Sub Focus song) =

Single by Chase & Status and Sub Focus featuring Takura

from the album No More Idols
- Released: 18 November 2011
- Recorded: 2010
- Genre: Dubstep
- Length: 4:11
- Label: Mercury; MTA; RAM
- Songwriters: Will Kennard; Saul Milton; Nick Douwma; Takura Tendayi
- Producers: Chase & Status; Sub Focus

Chase & Status singles chronology
"Hitz" (2011)	"Flashing Lights" (2011)	"Big Man" (2012)

Sub Focus singles chronology
"Splash" (2010)	"Flashing Lights" (2011)	"Falling Down" (2012)

Music video
- "Flashing Lights" on YouTube

"Flashing Lights" is a single performed by British drum and bass duo Chase & Status, featuring production from fellow producer and label mate Sub Focus and vocals from Takura Tendayi. The single was released as a digital download on 18 November 2011 and serves as the seventh overall, fifth official and final single from Chase & Status' second studio album No More Idols.

Takura Tendayi had previously collaborated with both Chase & Status and Sub Focus, appearing on their respective debut albums More than Alot and Sub Focus. He provided vocals for "Can't Get Enough", "Streetlife", "Running" and "Is It Worth It" by Chase & Status, as well as "World of Hurt" and "Coming Closer" by Sub Focus. He is also the vocalist in "No Problem", the opening track of No More Idols. "Flashing Lights" was Takura's first official single.

A music video to accompany the release of "Flashing Lights", directed by Ben Newman, was first released onto YouTube on 18 November 2011, at a total length of four minutes and thirty-four seconds.

== Track listing ==
Digital download
No.	Title	Length
1.	"Flashing Lights" (featuring Takura) (radio edit)	3:06
2.	"Flashing Lights" (featuring Takura) (S. P. Y remix)	5:00
3.	"Brixton Briefcase" (featuring CeeLo Green and D Double E) (VIP mix)	4:22
4.	"Brixton Briefcase" (featuring CeeLo Green) (VIP dub mix)	4:22

=== 12" vinyl ===
RAM Records had released the S. P. Y remix on limited edition 12" picture disc vinyls on 21 April 2011 to celebrate Record Store Day.

No.	Title	Length
1.	"Flashing Lights" (featuring Takura) (S. P. Y remix)	5:00

=== Remixes ===
In 2012, remixes by dubstep duo KillSonik and rapper Mac Miller were released as a Beatport-exclusive and a free download, respectively.

- "Flashing Lights" (featuring Takura) (KillSonik remix) – 4:41
- "Flashing Lights" (featuring Takura) (Mac Miller remix) – 2:53

== Credits and personnel ==
- Lead vocals – Takura Tendayi
- Producers – Saul Milton, Will Kennard, Nick Douwma
- Songwriters – Will Kennard, Saul Milton, Nick Douwma, Takura Tendayi
- Label: Mercury, MTA, RAM

== Chart performance ==
Chart (2011)	Peak position
Belgium (Ultratip Bubbling Under Flanders)	74
UK Dance (Official Charts)	15
UK Singles (Official Charts)	98

== Release history ==
Region	Date	Format	Label
United Kingdom	18 November 2011	Digital download	Mercury
United Kingdom	21 April 2011	12"	RAM
