= Cyrus Mahboubian =

British artist and photographer (born 1986)

- Born: 1986 (age 39–40); London, UK
- Occupations: Artist, photographer, filmmaker
- Years active: 2010–present
- Style: natural beauty, soft focus, timeless aesthetic
- Website: http://mahboubian.com

Cyrus Mahboubian (1986, London, UK) is a British artist and photographer. He is based in London.

== Work ==
Mahboubian has received attention for his use of analogue materials, especially polaroid. He has been invited to teach and speak on the subject of analogue photography at venues such as Tate Britain and The Photographers' Gallery.

In a 2019 interview with leading photography website Photomonitor, Mahboubian states that he takes an intentionally slow approach to his work: "the increasing influence of technology in our lives ... is something that's profoundly on my mind. At some point over the years I discovered that walking and making photographs in quiet, remote landscapes was deeply fulfilling and provided an escape from the fast pace of life in a big city..."

His first book VISCERA, which features a body of work shot on expired Polaroid film, was published in 2019 with the launch held at Sotheby's in May and book signings at the London Art Book Fair at Whitechapel Gallery in September and at Sketch in October.

In 2024, a solo booth of his work was shown at Photo London and he was subsequently included in an exhibition at major London photography institution The Photographers' Gallery. From July to October 2026, The Photographers' Gallery presented a solo exhibition of Mahboubian's work in an offsite project at Aldgate Tower in Whitechapel, London.

== Exhibitions ==
Mahboubian's work has been exhibited extensively, including in London, Paris, Los Angeles, Dubai, Moscow and Istanbul.

In September 2014, West Hollywood art gallery De Re Gallery held a solo exhibition of Mahboubian's photographic series 'Muse'. The exhibition received favourable reviews by critics in Los Angeles and was included on LA Weekly's list of "5 Artsy Things to do in L.A." which compared the naturalistic style of Mahboubian's work to that of the film director Éric Rohmer.

In November 2015, during Paris Photo, Galerie Nivet-Carzon in Paris held a solo exhibition of Mahboubian's new polaroid work entitled 'Mulholland: Polaroids from L.A.'.

In April 2016, Galerie Nivet-Carzon presented a solo exhibition of Mahboubian's new work 'Murmur', a series of expressionistic black-and-white images of rough seas and female nudes, which was praised for its strong poetic quality by veteran art critic Jean-Paul Gavard-Perret.

In July–September 2017, Arthill Gallery in London presented a selection of Mahboubian's latest works in a summer exhibition, including new video work 'Elegy'.

In November 2018-January 2019, The Edit in Dubai presented a solo exhibition, 'Nomad', of black-and-white topographical photographs made in North Africa.

In April–November 2019, a group of Mahboubian's work was included in a major temporary exhibition at the Pitt Rivers Museum titled 'Lande: the Calais "Jungle" and Beyond'.

London-based art advisory Artvisor, founded by Piero Tomassoni, presented solo exhibitions of Mahboubian's work in 2020 and 2022.

In June 2025, a high-profile exhibition of his work was held in the Madrid studio of Cuban artist Carlos Garaicoa as part of major photography festival PHotoEspaña.

== Awards ==
In 2014, Chelsea Arts Club Trust awarded Mahboubian the position of Artist-in-Residence at the Gate Theatre in London. He was commissioned to produce an exhibition for the theatre's production of 'The Body of an American' based on the true story of the U.S. military's 1993 operation in Mogadishu.

== Notable collaborations ==
In 2024, Mahboubian collaborated with Polaroid B.V. on a series of events in London. Having been commissioned by the company to make a new body of work using its I-2 camera and latest black-and-white instant film, he gave a talk and led a workshop at The Photographers' Gallery.

In early 2018, he was commissioned to produce original artwork for permanent display at Soho House (club) in London, the original Soho House founded in London in 1995. Further works by Mahboubian are displayed at Soho House locations in New York. In November 2019, he gave a talk at Soho Farmhouse in the Oxfordshire countryside.

In 2015 he directed the video work 'Un hôte' which features an original monologue written and performed by French artist Alison Bignon. The film premiered at Palazzo Biscari in Catania, Sicily in June 2015 and in London at Edge of Arabia in August 2015. In 2020, Mahboubian and Bignon worked together again on a co-authored digital publication 'A Letter to Earth', which was released online during the COVID-19 global pandemic.

Mahboubian has worked closely with the pop band Alpines. The cover of their debut album 'Oasis' features a colour photograph by Mahboubian shot using Polaroid film. In late 2016, Alpines released their second album 'Another River', with the album cover and artwork featuring photographs by Mahboubian shot in a desert landscape.

== Curatorial projects ==
In May 2025, Mahboubian curated ANTIDOTE: A Polaroid Exhibition which presented a multigenerational lineup of photographers using the Polaroid medium in innovative ways. The exhibition took place at Maison Pan, an artist-run space in the former storage vaults of the National Gallery in Trafalgar Square, London, and featured acclaimed artists including Roger Ballen. He presented a second version of the exhibition, featuring an updated line-up of artists, at Photo London art fair in 2026.

In 2017, Mahboubian co-founded MIGRATE with friend Sandra Nuoramo, a photobook and exhibition presenting new photography exploring global migration by eight international photographers, which received extensive press coverage including BBC News, The Guardian and Global Citizen. In an interview with The Guardian, Mahboubian was quoted as saying, "Living in London, we find ourselves largely detached from the ongoing refugee crisis, despite its staggering scale. I wanted us to inspire fellow Londoners to have a conversation about it." The exhibition took place at Omeara in London Bridge from 29 August to 2 September. It toured to the University of Oxford in 2018, with an exhibition at St Cross College from 15 to 25 February, and later to the LCB Depot in Leicester from 18 to 24 June as part of Journeys Festival International 2018, where Mahboubian gave a talk on 19 June.
