= Turn It Around (Sub Focus song) =

Single by Sub Focus featuring Kele

from the album Torus
- B-side: "Turn It Around" (TC remix)
- Released: 22 September 2013
- Genre: Drumstep; drum and bass
- Length: 3:13
- Label: Virgin EMI; Mercury; RAM
- Songwriters: Nick Douwma; Kele Okereke
- Producer: Sub Focus

Sub Focus singles chronology
"Endorphins" (2013)	"Turn It Around" (2013)	"Turn Back Time" (2013)

Kele Okereke singles chronology
"What Did I Do?" (2011)	"Turn It Around" (2013)	"Doubt" (2014)

Music video
- "Turn It Around" on YouTube

"Turn It Around" is a song by British DJ and record producer Sub Focus, featuring vocals from Bloc Party's lead singer Kele Okereke (credited as Kele on the release). It was released as the fifth single from Sub Focus' second studio album Torus on 22 September 2013, through Virgin EMI Records, Mercury Records and RAM Records.

== Music video ==
A music video to accompany the release of "Turn It Around" was first released onto YouTube on 28 August 2013, with a total length of three minutes and thirty-two seconds. The video, which was filmed in various locations in Japan, tells the story of a girl who dislikes the technology surrounding her. She escapes city life by discovering nature, which in turn "turns her life around".

== Track listing ==
Digital download – single
No.	Title	Length
1.	"Turn It Around" (featuring Kele)	3:13

Digital download – EP
No.	Title	Length
1.	"Turn It Around" (featuring Kele) (MK remix)	7:34
2.	"Turn It Around" (featuring Kele) (MK dub)	7:34
3.	"Turn It Around" (featuring Kele) (TC remix)	3:49
4.	"Turn It Around" (featuring Kele) (Jacob Plant remix)	4:52

12" vinyl
No.	Title	Length
1.	"Turn It Around" (featuring Kele)	3:13
2.	"Turn It Around" (featuring Kele) (TC remix)	3:49

== Chart performance ==
=== Weekly charts ===
Chart (2013)	Peak position
Scotland Singles (Official Charts)	14
UK Dance (Official Charts)	5
UK Singles (Official Charts)	14

== Release history ==
Region	Date	Format	Label
Worldwide	22 September 2013	12"; digital download	Virgin EMI; Mercury; RAM
