= Close (Sub Focus song) =

Single by Sub Focus

from the album Torus
- Released: 21 April 2014
- Recorded: 2013
- Genre: Deep house; UK garage
- Length: 5:09 (album version); 3:50 (radio edit)
- Label: Virgin EMI; Mercury; RAM
- Songwriters: Nick Douwma; Uzoechi Emenike
- Producer: Sub Focus

Sub Focus singles chronology
"Turn Back Time" (2013)	"Close" (2014)	"Nobody Knows" (2016)

Music video
- "Close" on YouTube

"Close" is a song by British DJ and record producer Sub Focus. It was released on 21 April 2014 as the seventh single from his second studio album Torus. The song featured vocals from British singer MNEK in the album version. The vocals on the single version are performed by British singer Daniel Pearce. The new vocals were re-produced by Hal Ritson, who also provided backing vocals.

== Music video ==
The official music video to accompany the release of the single was premiered through YouTube on 22 May 2014. It was directed by Brendan Canty and produced by Feel Good Lost and LoveLive. It was filmed during the Sub Focus LIVE event at O2 Academy Brixton on 17 April 2014. The video runs at a total duration of three minutes and fifty-four seconds.

== Track listing ==
Digital download
No.	Title	Length
1.	"Close" (radio edit)	3:50
2.	"Close" (Friend Within remix)	6:04
3.	"Close" (Ivy Lab remix)	5:30
4.	"Close" (Grandtheft remix)	4:15

12" vinyl
No.	Title	Length
1.	"Close"
2.	"Close" (Ivy Lab remix)

== Credits and personnel ==
Credits adapted from vinyl release.

- Writer – Uzoechi Emenike
- Producer – Nick Douwma
- Vocal production – Hal Ritson
- Lead vocals – Daniel Pearce
- Backing vocals – Daniel Pearce, Hal Ritson
- Label – Virgin EMI Records, Mercury Records, RAM Records

== Chart performance ==
=== Weekly charts ===
Chart (2014)	Peak position
UK Dance (Official Charts)	32

== Release history ==
Country	Release date	Format	Label
Worldwide	21 April 2014	12"; digital download	Virgin EMI; Mercury; RAM
