= Takura =

Zimbabwean singer and songwriter

- Born: Takura Tendayi
- Origin: Harare, Zimbabwe
- Genres: Electro house; dubstep; drum and bass; deep house; moombahton
- Occupations: Singer; songwriter
- Instrument: Vocals
- Years active: 2009–present

Takura Shonhai is a Zimbabwean singer and songwriter. He is well known for his frequent collaborations with Chase & Status and Sub Focus, as well as many other dubstep and drum and bass artists. His guest appearances have accumulated over 17 million views on YouTube , and his song "Flashing Lights" has charted in the United Kingdom at number 98 in the UK Singles Chart and number 15 in the UK Dance Chart. He managed to share a stage with Plan B and also co-wrote Rihanna's 2009 single "Wait Your Turn" which has over 28 million views on YouTube. This song was charted at number 45 in the UK Singles Chart. On 10 September 2013, Door Policy released the three-track EP No Cover Charge for free download. It features a guest appearance from "Traktor" singer L Marshall.

== Discography ==
=== Singles ===
==== As lead artist ====
Year	Song
2014	"Sun Goes Down"

==== As featured artist ====
Year	Song	Album	Label
2011	"Flashing Lights" (Chase & Status and Sub Focus featuring Takura)	No More Idols	Mercury Records
2012	"Led Astray" (by Friction, featured vocals)	Led Astray EP	Shogun Audio
2012	"Network" (by Dream Mclean, featured vocals)	Non-album single	MTA Records
2012	"Pop Off" (Maxsta featuring Takura)	Non-album single	Sony
2013	"The Coming Storm" (Freestylers and Stereo:Type featuring Takura)	The Coming Storm	Rub-A-Duck
2013	"Refuse To Love" (by Loadstar, featured vocals)	Future Perfect	RAM Records
2013	"Rage Within" (The Prototypes featuring Takura)	Non-album single	Shogun Audio
2013	"Zimma Frame" (Show N Prove featuring Takura)	Non-album single	All Around the World
2013	"Friday" (Shadow Child featuring Takura)	Collected	Food Music
2014	"2 Late" (SLOWOLF featuring Dream Mclean and Takura)	Wolf Grey EP	SLOWOLF Records
2014	"My Money" (SLOWOLF featuring Dream Mclean, Felix De Luca, Takura and Wil Cousin)	Wolf Grey EP	SLOWOLF Records
2014	"ESG" (Tinchy Stryder featuring Takura)	360°	Cloud 9
2016	"Access Denied" (P Money, Big Narstie and Example featuring Takura)	Non-album single	Not on label
2016	"Original Badman" (Star.One featuring Takura and Agent Sasco (Assassin))	Non-album single	Sony
2017	"Diamonds" (Loadstar featuring Takura)	I Need the Night	RAM Records
2017	"Trouble" (The Last Skeptik featuring Kojey Radical and Takura)	This is Where It Gets Good	Thanks for Trying Records
2023	"Baddadan" (Chase & Status featuring Bou, Irah, Flowdan, Trigga and Takura)	Non-album single	EMI

=== Other appearances ===
Year	Song	Release	Label
2008	"Can't Get Enough" (by Chase & Status, featured vocals)	More Than Alot	RAM Records
2008	"Streetlife" (Chase & Status featuring Takura)	More Than Alot	RAM Records
2008	"Running" (Chase & Status featuring Takura)	More Than Alot	RAM Records
2008	"Is It Worth It" (Chase & Status featuring Takura)	More Than Alot	RAM Records
2009	"Follow the Light" (Vocal Mix) (by Sub Focus, featured vocals)	Rock It / Follow the Light	RAM Records
2009	"World of Hurt" (by Sub Focus, featured vocals)	Sub Focus	RAM Records
2009	"Coming Closer" (Sub Focus featuring Takura)	Sub Focus	RAM Records
2009	"Wait Your Turn" (by Rihanna, as writer)	Rated R	Def Jam
2010	"Is It Worth It VIP" (Chase & Status featuring Takura)	End Credits	RAM Records
2010	"Sick Note" (by Example, featured vocals)	Won't Go Quietly	Data
2010	"Spaceship" (by Kano, featured vocals)	Method to the Maadness	BPM
2011	"No Problem" (by Chase and Status, featured vocals)	No More Idols	Mercury Records
2012	"Demons" (by Delta Heavy, featured vocals)	Down the Rabbit Hole	RAM Records
2012	"Summer Days" (Sigma featuring Takura)	Hospitality Summer Drum & Bass 2012	Hospital
2012	"Have a Go" (Swindle featuring Takura)	Need To Know	Swindle Productions
2012	"Drug Dealer" (Plan B featuring Takura)	iLL Manors	679
2012	"Memories (Come Back)" (Don Diablo featuring Takura)	Lights Out EP	Sony
2012	"Careless" (Jack Beats featuring Takura)	Careless	Owsla
2012	"Alive" (Rollz featuring Takura)	Firepod	Pilot
2013	"The Coming Storm (VIP Mix)" (Freestylers and Stereo:Type featuring Takura)	The Coming Storm (VIP Mix)	Rub-A-Duck
2013	"Searching" (by Kove, as writer)	Measures	MTA Records
2013	"Endorphins" (by Sub Focus featuring Alex Clare, as writer)	Torus	RAM Records / Mercury
2013	"Out of Reach" (by Sub Focus featuring Jayelldee, as writer)	Torus	RAM Records / Mercury
2013	"Money Waster" (by Marshall F, featured vocals)	Money Waster	Black Butter Records
2014	"Overdose" (SLOWOLF featuring Natalia and Takura)	Bounty EP	SLOWOLF Records
2014	"Princess" (SLOWOLF featuring Raekwon, Benny Banks and Takura)	Bounty EP	SLOWOLF Records
2014	"Running Low" (by Netsky featuring Beth Ditto, as writer)	TBA	Sony
2014	"I Need Cs" (Context featuring Takura)	Hindsight is the Purest Form of Romance	Self-released
2015	"Fossa" (Kiwi featuring Takura)	Animals EP	Blasé Boys Club
2015	"AFRiCA" (WiDE AWAKE featuring Takura)	Hard As Nails EP	TBA
2017	"Beg & Borrow" (by Dimension, featured vocals)	Generator / Beg & Borrow	Dimension
2017	"Tribes" (by Chase and Status, featured vocals)	Tribe	MTA Records
2018	"Blood" (Big Narstie featuring Takura)	BDL Bipolar	Dice Recordings
2018	"Gully" (My Nu Leng & Holy Goof featuring Takura)	Junction EP	Maraki Records

=== Unreleased tracks ===
Year	Song
2012	"Is That You"
2012	"B.B.O.P (Baddest Bitch on the Planet)"
2012	"Kerosene" (Drop Lamond featuring Takura)
2013	"Suffocating Me" (Skream & Redlight featuring Takura)
