= Portals (Sub Focus and Wilkinson album) =

Studio album by Sub Focus and Wilkinson
- Released: 9 October 2020
- Studio: Real World (Wiltshire)
- Genre: Drum and bass
- Length: 51:25
- Label: Virgin EMI
- Producer: Sub Focus; Wilkinson; Icarus

Sub Focus chronology
Torus (2013)	Portals (2020)	Evolve (2023)

Wilkinson chronology
Hypnotic (2017)	Portals (2020)	Cognition (2022)

Singles from Portals
- 1. "Illuminate" Released: 13 September 2019; 2. "Just Hold On" Released: 24 April 2020; 3. "Air I Breathe" Released: 7 August 2020; 4. "Turn the Lights Off" Released: 5 October 2020; 5. "Freedom" Released: 8 January 2021

Portals is a studio album by English DJ and record producers Sub Focus and Wilkinson. It was released on 9 October 2020 by Virgin EMI Records. The album includes the singles "Illuminate", "Just Hold On", "Air I Breathe", "Turn the Lights Off" and "Freedom".

== Background ==
Talking about the collaboration and releasing an album together, Sub Focus and Wilkinson said, "We first linked up to make a track called 'Take It Up' in 2018 and we were really encouraged by the response. We headlined a big festival in the UK together and really saw the potential of us extending the partnership [...] we just didn't feel like anything that ambitious in terms of albums was being made in drum 'n' bass at the time and that became our mission for this record."

== Singles ==
"Illuminate" was released as the lead single from the album on 13 September 2019. "Just Hold On" was released as the second single from the album on 24 April 2020. "Air I Breathe" was released as the third single from the album on 7 August 2020. "Turn the Lights Off" was released as the fourth single from the album on 5 October 2020. "Freedom" was released as the fifth single from the album on 8 January 2021, after the album's release. It was released along with a remix from both Sub Focus and Wilkinson, along with High Contrast.

== Track listing ==
Portals track listing
No.	Title	Writer(s)	Producer(s)	Length
1.	"Air I Breathe"	Clementine Douglas; John Calvert; Nicolaas Douwma; Mark Wilkinson	Nicolaas Douwma; Mark Wilkinson	4:10
2.	"Enter Night" (with Cameron Hayes)	Heather Cameron-Hayes; Calvert; Douwma; Tom Varrall; Wilkinson	Douwma; Wilkinson	3:57
3.	"Illuminate"	Douwma; Varrall; Tom Havelock; Wilkinson	Douwma; Wilkinson	2:59
4.	"Freedom" (with Empara Mi)	Chloe Curran; Douwma; Wilkinson	Douwma; Wilkinson	4:02
5.	"Turn the Lights Off"	Douwma; Wilkinson	Douwma; Wilkinson	3:48
6.	"Just Hold On"	Ian Griffiths; Calvert; Douwma; Tom Griffiths; Havelock; Vula Malinga; Wilkinson	Icarus; Douwma; Wilkinson	4:59
7.	"Ray of Sun" (with PAWWS)	Lucy Taylor; Douwma; Wilkinson	Douwma; Wilkinson	5:31
8.	"Alone" (with iiola)	Douwma; Shannon Saunders; Wilkinson	Douwma; Wilkinson	5:26
9.	"Time"	Calvert; Douwma; Varrall; Havelock; Wilkinson	Douwma; Wilkinson	5:09
10.	"Stratus"	Douwma; Wilkinson	Douwma; Wilkinson	4:06
11.	"In Bloom"	Douwma; Saunders; Wilkinson	Douwma; Wilkinson	5:31
Total length:				51:25

== Charts ==
Chart performance for Portals
Chart (2020)	Peak position
New Zealand Albums (RMNZ)	26
UK Albums (OCC)	68
UK Dance Albums (OCC)	1

== Release history ==
Release history and formats for Portals
Country	Date	Label	Format
United Kingdom	9 October 2020	Virgin EMI	Digital download; streaming
