= Endorphins (song) =

Single by Sub Focus featuring Alex Clare

from the album Torus
- Released: 12 May 2013
- Recorded: 2012
- Genre: Dubstep
- Length: 4:06 (album version); 3:18 (radio edit)
- Label: Virgin EMI; Mercury; RAM
- Songwriters: Nick Douwma; Amanda Ghost; Ian Dench; Takura Tendayi
- Producer: Sub Focus

Sub Focus singles chronology
"Tidal Wave" (2012)	"Endorphins" (2013)	"Turn It Around" (2013)

Alex Clare singles chronology
"Hummingbird" (2012)	"Endorphins" (2013)	"Give It All" (2013)

Music video
- "Endorphins" on YouTube

"Endorphins" is the fourth single by British DJ and record producer Sub Focus, released from his second studio album Torus. The song features vocals from British singer Alex Clare. The song has reached number 10 on the UK Singles Chart and number seven on the UK Dance Chart.

== Background and release ==
"Endorphins" originally featured female vocalist Amanda Ghost, and was given to several artists including Ian Dench and Takura who wrote parts of the song. However, in the end Alex Clare visited Douwma's studio to record what would be the final version of the track. The song entered the UK Singles Chart at number 10, making it his highest-charting single to date.

== Music video ==
A music video to accompany the release of "Endorphins" was first released onto YouTube on 1 May 2013 at a total length of four minutes and 11 seconds. In the video, due to an enforced belief of "Unity Through Compliance", soldiers must keep order by preventing people from listening to music. They exercise this by finding people doing such in hideouts and capturing them. They also destroy and burn their speakers, stereos and records. At the end of the video, the soldiers are ironically seen playing a stereo.

== Track listing ==
Digital download
No.	Title	Length
1.	"Endorphins" (featuring Alex Clare)	4:06
2.	"Endorphins" (featuring Alex Clare) (Sub Focus vs. Fred V & Grafix remix)	4:35
3.	"Endorphins" (featuring Alex Clare) (Tommy Trash remix)	6:14
4.	"Endorphins" (featuring Alex Clare) (Dismantle remix)	4:36

12" vinyl
No.	Title	Length
1.	"Endorphins" (featuring Alex Clare) (Sub Focus vs. Fred V & Grafix remix)	4:35
2.	"Endorphins" (featuring Alex Clare)	4:06

== Charts ==
Chart (2013)	Peak position
Belgium (Ultratip Bubbling Under Flanders)	84
Scottish Singles Sales (Official Charts)	11
Slovakia Airplay (ČNS IFPI)	41
UK Singles (Official Charts)	10
UK Dance (Official Charts)	7

== Certifications ==
Region	Certification	Certified units/sales
New Zealand (RMNZ)	Gold	15,000^{‡}
United Kingdom (BPI)	Silver	200,000^{‡}
^{‡} Sales+streaming figures based on certification alone.

== Release history ==
Region	Date	Format	Label
United Kingdom	12 May 2013	12"; digital download	Virgin EMI; Mercury; RAM
