= Culture Shock (musician) =

British drum and bass DJ and producer

- Birth name: James Pountney
- Born: 23 January
- Genres: Drum and bass; breakbeat
- Occupations: DJ; record producer
- Years active: 2004–present
- Labels: Culture Shock Music
- Website: www.cultureshockmusic.com

James Pountney, better known by his stage name Culture Shock, is a British drum and bass DJ and record producer.

== Biography ==
In 1996, Culture Shock was introduced to drum and bass while listening to London's pirate radio stations. He set up his own studio with basic equipment at home and recorded his own music. His first release was "The Vega EP" on Moving Shadow in 2004. Two years later, Culture Shock signed with RAM Records after attracting attention of the label's CEO, Andy C. His first EP, titled "The Third Stage" was released in 2007 and featured four tracks, including the track "Rework", co-produced by the Brookes Brothers.

After a longer break, he returned in September 2014 with a remix of Moko's "Your Love" and the songs "Troglodyte VIP" and "Raindrops". His song "City Lights", which has featured as an instrumental in his DJ sets since 2009, was picked up by Virgin EMI Records and released in May 2015 with a vocal by Bryn Christopher of I See MONSTAS. The single has received airplay on popular UK radio stations and music channels, and was BBC Radio 1's Track of the Day. In November/December 2015, he released tracks from his latest extended play entitled Transit.

== Discography ==
=== Compilations ===
Title	Details
Sequence	Released: 7 June 2019; Label: RAM Records; Formats: Digital download
Sequel	Released: 25 February 2022; Label: RAM Records; Formats: Digital download

=== Extended plays ===
Title	Details	Track listing
The Vega EP	Released: 2004; Label: Moving Shadow; Formats: Digital download, vinyl	"Vega"; "White Knight"; "Alarms"; "Flight Path"
The Third Stage	Released: 30 July 2007; Label: RAM Records; Formats: Digital download, vinyl	"Rework" (with Brookes Brothers); "Zeppelin"; "Vice Chase"; "Asteroids"
Transit	Released: 18 December 2015; Label: RAM Records; Formats: Digital download, vinyl	"No More" (with Josh Parkinson); "Steam Machine"; "Tangents"; "Rush Connection"

=== Singles ===
Year	Release	Label	Album
2008	"Kronix" / "Imax"	RAM Records	Non-album single
2010	"Bad Red" / "Surprise"	RAM Records	Non-album single
2011	"Protection" / "Ohrwurm"	RAM Records	Non-album single
2012	"I Remember" / "Troglodyte"	RAM Records	Non-album single
2014	"Raindrops" / "Troglodyte VIP"	RAM Records	Non-album single
2015	"City Lights" (featuring Bryn Christopher)	Virgin EMI / RAM Records	Non-album single
2016	"Have It All" / "Pandemic"	RAM Records	Non-album single
2017	"Bunker"	RAM Records	Sequence
2018	"East Block"	RAM Records	Sequence
2018	"There For You"	RAM Records / Mau5trap	Sequence
2018	"Get Physical"	RAM Records	Sequence
2019	"Take Control"	RAM Records	Sequence
2019	"Renaissance"	RAM Records	Sequence
2020	"Love To Give" (with Dimension featuring Billy Lockett)	Self-Released	Organ
2020	"Don't Sleep" (with Dimension)	Self-Released	Non-album single
2020	"Visions"	RAM Records	Sequel
2020	"Lost"	RAM Records	Sequel
2021	"Deconstruct"	RAM Records	Sequel
2021	"Discotheque"	RAM Records	Sequel
2021	"Rise"	RAM Records	Sequel
2022	"Panorama"	RAM Records	Sequel
2023	"Alone" (ft. Gracie van Brunt)	Culture Shock Music	Non-album single
2023	"Universe" (ft. YOU)	Culture Shock Music	Non-album single
2024	"Get To Me"	Culture Shock Music	TBA
2024	"Breathe"	Culture Shock Music	TBA
2024	"Out My Head" (ft. Sarah de Warren)	Culture Shock Music	TBA
2024	"The Time Is Now"	Culture Shock Music	TBA
2024	"Back In Time" (ft. Totally Enormous Extinct Dinosaurs)	Culture Shock Music	TBA
2024	"Make It Pump" (ft. Grafix)	Culture Shock Music	TBA

=== Other appearances ===
Year	Song	Album
2006	"The Bypass"	Dimensions 2 EP
2008	"Smoothie" (Culture Shock & Brookes Brothers)	Dimensions 3 EP
2009	"Gears"	Dimensions 4 EP
2009	"Move Higher" (Sub Focus featuring Culture Shock)	Sub Focus
2010	"Cathedral"	Nightlife EP, Pt. 1
2011	"Footloose"	Nightlife EP, Pt. 3
2011	"Machine"	Ram 100
2013	"You Make It Better" (Sub Focus featuring Culture Shock and TC)	Torus
2015	"Piano Dark"	Ram 200
2018	"Erosion" (The Upbeats featuring Culture Shock)	No Sleep 'Til Japan & Iceland
2023	"Secrets" (Sub Focus featuring Culture Shock, CamelPhat and RHODES)	Evolve

=== Production credits ===
Year	Song	Artist	Album
2013	"Turn the Lights On"	Fleur	Non-album single

=== Remixes ===
Year	Song	Artist
2011	"Guilt"	Nero
2012	"Come Alive"	Netsky
2014	"Your Love"	Moko
2014	"Love Alight"	Crystal Fighters
2014	"Pistols At Dawn"	Seinabo Sey
2015	"King"	GRADES
2015	"Swan Song"	Espa (featuring Giggs)
2018	"Broken Pieces"	Camo & Krooked (featuring NIHILS)
2018	"Panic Room"	Au/Ra
2021	"Airplane"	Sub Focus
