= Metrik =

English electronic music producer

- Born: Thomas Mundell; 27 December 1986 (age 39)
- Origin: London, England, United Kingdom
- Genres: Drum and bass; dubstep; house
- Years active: 2007–present
- Label: Hospital
- Website: metrikmusic.com

Thomas Mundell (born 27 December 1986), better known as Metrik, is an English electronic music producer from London. He has been releasing records since 2007, primarily through Hospital Records, the UK-based independent dance music label. He has found success in the UK Dance Albums Chart, with his second and third studio albums "Life/Thrills" and "Ex Machina" peaking at No. 4 and No. 2 respectively.

== Career ==
=== 2010–2012: Early career ===
In 2010, Metrik released his debut EP, The Departure EP, on Viper Recordings, which included "T-1000" as well as collaborations with Jan Burton ("The Arrival" / "Learn To Fly") and techno producers Christian Smith & John Selway ("The Departure"). In 2011 he released Between Worlds EP on Viper Recordings which included "T-2000" and "I See You" which featured vocals from house singer Kathy Brown. In 2012 he released Flightwave EP as a free download. Later that year he released one of his one of his most iconic tracks, "Freefall", featuring the vocals of Australian singer Reija Lee.

=== 2012–2016: Universal Language ===
In November 2012, he signed exclusively to Hospital Records. Soon after he was invited to do the prestigious BBC Radio 1 Essential Mix and appeared on the front cover of Computer Music Magazine with a Producer Masterclass. His 2014 single "Want My Love" (featuring Elisabeth Troy) became his first charting single peaking at number 61 in the UK Singles Chart and no. 31 in the UK Dance Chart. His debut album, Universal Language was released on 29 September 2014, following the album's second single "Human Again" (featuring Jan Burton), peaking at no. 13 in the UK Dance Chart. "Believe" was featured on Microsoft's Forza Horizon 2 and "Make the Floor Burn VIP" was featured in Season 4 Episode 1 of Luther. His collaboration with Friction "Legacy" was used as the lead track for Hospital Records's milestone "We Are 18" album. In 2015 Metrik collaborated with Belgian drum & bass artist Netsky on "Can't Speak" (featuring Stealth) and remixed Enter Shikari's "The Appeal & The Mindsweep I".

=== 2016–2018: Life/Thrills ===
On 7 October 2016, Metrik released his second album Life/Thrills with critical acclaim and hit number 4 in the UK Dance Chart. The album amassed over 6 million streams on Spotify in its first year of release and spawned three singles. "Chasing Sunrise" (featuring Elisabeth Troy) became BBC Radio 1's "Track Of The Day", reached number 2 in Radio 1's Specialist Chart and playlisted for 6 weeks on Apple Music Beats 1. "Life/Thrills" (feat. Namgawd) featured on the Sony Xperia TrackID Online advert and was licensed officially for the 2017 release of Gran Turismo Sport. "We Got It" (featuring Rothwell), the third and final single from Life/Thrills was released in February 2017. The track reached over 2 million streams on Spotify and was awarded "Best Remix" at the Drum&BassArena Awards 2017. Other notable tracks "Cadence" and "Hi!" featured on Microsoft's Forza Horizon 3 and "Bring It Like That" featured on Wipeout Omega Collection. In December Metrik remixed "X-Ray" by Sub Focus, which hit number 1 on the Beatport drum & bass chart. Metrik was interviewed by DJ Mag, UKF and The Sun.

In January 2017, Metrik joined BBC Radio 1 as a resident DJ and embarked on an extensive tour across Europe, USA, Canada, Japan, Australia and New Zealand with notable festival performances at Reading & Leeds, Glastonbury, Bestival, EDC Las Vegas, Hospitality in the Park and others. His performance at Bestival alongside Dynamite MC was broadcast live on BBC Radio 1. In May he performed at the Sony PlayStation Headquarters showcasing the official launch of WipeOut Omega. The livestream was viewed over 15 million times on streaming platform Twitch. The year birthed a new working relationship with Dolby as an ambassador for Dolby Atmos for Music, an initiative bringing immersive audio to live music venues. Metrik premiered the first-ever drum and bass show in Dolby Atmos to a sold-out crowd at Sound-Bar in Chicago as part of his Autumn 2017 USA tour. Later in the year, Metrik was a featured artist at the Ableton Loop summit for music makers at Funkhaus Berlin, and led a masterclass on production techniques for Dolby Atmos content creation and mastering tools.

Metrik has remixed selected works of Eric Prydz, Swedish House Mafia, DJ Fresh & Ellie Goulding, Sub Focus, Martin Garrix & Sander van Doorn, Skepta, Enter Shikari, Gorgon City, Dirtyphonics, Ayah Marar, Camo & Krooked and John B on labels such as EMI, Parlophone, 3Beat, Ministry of Sound, Hospital Records, Dim Mak Records, Spinnin' and Destined Records.

=== 2019–2022: Ex Machina ===
In April 2019, the song "Hackers" was released, revealing a less mainstream approach, and in September Metrik released "Gravity".

Amongst other Hospital Records artists, he performed at "Hospitality Berlin" on 13 April 2019, "Hospitality Summer BBQ" on 4 May 2019, at "Hospitality Bristol BBQ" on 8 June 2019 and "Hospitality In The Park" on 21 September 2019. Festival appearances included "A Weird & Wonderful Day Out" and Beat-Herder, he also performed at Fabric on 24 May 2019.

In February 2020, Metrik released "We Are the Energy" via Hospital Records. In June 2020, his third studio album, Ex Machina was released along the single "Parallel" which features Grafix. In July, Metrik released a new song featuring ShockOne, titled "Dying Light".

Metrik was voted best producer of 2020 in the Drum&BassArena Awards.

April 2022 saw Metrik release "Skyline", a collaboration with Grafix which also featured on Grafix's album Half Life.

=== 2023: New music ===
In January 2023 Metrik released the single "Immortal", followed by "Fall to the Dust" in June and "Abyss" in November. All three tracks feature Metrik's lead vocal and include metal influences.

== Discography ==
=== Studio albums ===
Title	Details	Peak chart positions
Title	Details	UK Dance
Universal Language	Released: 29 September 2014; Label: Hospital; Formats: Digital download, CD, vinyl	13
Life/Thrills	Released: 7 October 2016; Label: Hospital; Formats: Digital download, CD, vinyl	4
Ex Machina	Released: 26 June 2020; Label: Hospital; Formats: Digital download, CD, vinyl	2
Awake LP	Released: 13 November 2025; Label: Hospital; Formats: Digital download, CD, vinyl	4

=== Extended plays and singles ===
Year	Release	Label
2024	Setting Sun	Hospital Records
2024	Hole	Hospital Records
2023	Abyss	Hospital Records
2023	Awake with Blanke/AEON:MODE	Hospital Records
2023	Fall to the Dust	Hospital Records
2023	Immortal	Hospital Records
2021	Utopia	Hospital Records
2021	Overdrive with Grafix	Hospital Records
2020	Parallel with Grafix	Hospital Records
2020	Automata	Hospital Records
2020	We Are the Energy	Hospital Records
2019	Gravity	Hospital Records
2019	Hackers	Hospital Records
2018	Dawnbreaker	Hospital Records
2017	Fatso VIP	Hospital Records
2017	Tension with Fred V & Grafix	Hospital Records
2017	We Got It featuring Rothwell	Hospital Records
2016	Chasing Sunrise featuring Elisabeth Troy	Hospital Records
2016	LIFE/THRILLS featuring Namgawd	Hospital Records
2014	Human Again featuring Jan Burton	Hospital Records
2014	Want My Love featuring Elisabeth Troy	Hospital Records
2014	Legacy with Friction (on We Are 18)	Hospital Records
2013	Aurora with Camo & Krooked (on Zeitgeist)	Hospital Records
2013	Metrik EP	Hospital Records
2012	Freefall / Drift	Viper Recordings
2012	Engine Room	Viper Recordings
2012	Flightwave EP	---
2011	Between Worlds EP	Viper Recordings
2011	Brave New World	Viper Recordings
2011	More Than Words	Viper Recordings
2011	Sunset 2011	Viper Recordings
2010	The Departure EP	Viper Recordings
2010	Lightspeed	Viper Recordings
2009	Time to Change	Viper Recordings
2009	Sunset / Forward Approach	Viper Recordings
2008	Technicolour / Zero Gravity	Viper Recordings
2008	Moving On / Stranger	Viper Recordings
2007	Your World	Intrinsic

=== Remixes ===
Year	Song	Artist
2021	"Parallel" (VIP)	Metrik, Grafix
2021	"Sky Full of Diamonds"	Hybrid
2021	"Cadence" (VIP)	Metrik featuring Reija Lee
2019	"Dusty Fingers"	S. P. Y featuring Diane Charlemagne
2018	"All Night"	Polar Youth featuring Georgia Allen
2018	"I Need" (with Wilkinson)	Wilkinson featuring Hayla
2017	"X-Ray"	Sub Focus
2017	"Catalyze"	Bobby Tank featuring Luca Franco
2015	"The Appeal & the Mindsweep I"	Enter Shikari
2015	"Make the Floor Burn" (VIP)	Metrik
2014	"Gold Skies"	Sander van Doorn, Martin Garrix & DVBBS feat. Aleesia
2014	"Human Again" (VIP)	Metrik featuring Jan Burton
2014	"Flashlight"	DJ Fresh and Ellie Goulding
2014	"Unmissable"	Gorgon City featuring Zak Abel
2013	"Break of Dawn" (VIP)	Metrik
2013	"Turn Back Time"	Sub Focus
2013	"Freefall" (VIP)	Metrik featuring Reija Lee
2013	"Going Places"	Maidatrak
2013	"The Journey"	John B featuring Code 64
2012	"DIRTY"	Dirtyphonics
2012	"The Feeling"	DJ Fresh featuring RaVaughn
2012	"Childhood Memories"	Rockwell featuring Kito & Sam Frank
2012	"Unstoppable"	Ayah Marar
2012	"Broken Mirror"	Fleur & Cutline
2012	"Looking Glass"	BCee featuring Shaz Sparks
2011	"Niton (The Reason)"	Eric Prydz
2011	"Save the World"	Swedish House Mafia featuring John Martin
2011	"Cross the Line"	Camo & Krooked featuring Ayah Marar
2011	"Diabla"	Funk D'Void
2011	"Diagnosis Murder"	BCee featuring S.P.Y
2010	"So Alive"	Skepta vs. N-Dubz
2010	"Do You Feel"	Funkstar De Luxe
