= Dimension (musician) =

English musician and DJ (born 1991)

- Dimension in 2020

Background information
- Born: Robert Etheridge; 8 October 1991 (age 35)
- Origin: London, England
- Genres: Drum and bass; dance; electronic
- Years active: 2012–present
- Label: MTA
- Website: dimension.live

Robert Etheridge (born 8 October 1991), known professionally as Dimension, is an English musician and DJ from London.

== History ==
Etheridge was born on 8 October 1991 to British and Spanish parents. He was made to take piano lessons as a child, and began dabbling with electronic production after discovering FL Studio. He cites Pendulum's Hold Your Colour as an early influence, and for introducing him to drum and bass.

He released his debut single "Delight" in 2012, and received early support from Chase & Status who in 2014 signed him to their MTA Records label.

He received international attention with the release of his 2018 single "Desire" with Sub Focus, which rose to number 51 in the UK Singles Chart and is a platinum-certified record in the UK. In 2018, he mixed the 98th edition of the Fabric Live album.

In March 2021, he released his debut album Organ, which debuted at number one on the UK Official Dance Chart.

== Legal issues ==
In December 2021, Etheridge exited government-mandated isolation early after entering New Zealand. He visited nightclubs, restaurants, and shopping centres, before testing positive for the Omicron variant of COVID-19 – the first publicly recorded case of the variant in the country. He was not prosecuted.

== Discography ==
=== Albums ===
Title	Details
Organ	Released: 5 March 2021; Label: Warner, ADA; Formats: 12", LP, CD, digital download

=== Singles ===
Year	Release	Label
2011	"Arcade" (with Skankandbass)	Regal Records
2011	"Flavour / White House"	Regal Records
2012	"Delight / Death Row"	Southern Avenue Digital
2012	"Digital World / Detroit" (featuring Cyantific)	CYN Music
2013	"Synth City / Midnight Love"	CYN Music
2013	"All I Need" (featuring Bailey Tzuke) / "Basilica"	CYN Music
2014	"Command / Pathogen"	CYN Music
2014	"Crowd Reaction VIP / Digital World VIP"	CYN Music
2014	"Love to Me / Move Faster"	MTA Records
2015	"Jet Black / Whip Slap"	MTA Records
2015	"Pull Me Under / Maschinen"	MTA Records
2015	"Dark Lights / Panzer"	MTA Records
2016	"Automatik / Hydraulic"	MTA Records
2016	"UK / In Bleach"	MTA Records
2017	"Generator / Beg & Borrow"	Self-released
2017	"Black Church"	Self-released
2017	"Rush" (with Wilkinson)	RAM Records
2018	"Raver / Techno"	Self-released
2018	"Desire" (with Sub Focus)	EMI Records
2019	"Devotion"	Self-released
2019	"If You Want To"	Self-released
2020	"Love to Give" (with Culture Shock featuring Billy Lockett)	Self-released
2020	"Don't Sleep" (with Culture Shock)	Self-released
2020	"Saviour"	Self-released
2020	"Hatred" (featuring E11E)	Self-released
2020	"Remedy" (featuring TS Graye)	Self-released
2020	"Offender"	Self-released
2021	"Alive" (featuring Poppy Baskcomb)	Self-released
2022	"Ready to Fly" (with Sub Focus)	EMI Records
2023	"Where Do We Go" (featuring Poppy Baskcomb)	Self-released
2023	"DJ Turn It Up"	Self-released
2024	"Satellite" (with Alison Wonderland)	Self-released
2024	"Angel" (with Sub Focus, Nghtmre and Mougleta)	Self-released
2025	"Blow My Whistle" (with DJ Aligator)	Self-released
