= Harvest at Jimmy's =

Music festival in Ipswich, Suffolk, England

Harvest at Jimmy's is a two-day music and food festival held at Jimmy's Farm near Ipswich in Suffolk. The first ever Harvest Festival took place on 12–13 September 2009. The 2010 event took place on the same site on 11–12 September. The event is fairly unusual in the British festival calendar due to its equal combination of showcasing live music and live food demonstrations in a family atmosphere and environment.

== 2009 event ==
=== Music line-up ===
The festival featured one main stage of music with live music performances throughout both days including KT Tunstall, Seth Lakeman, Athlete, José González, Badly Drawn Boy, along with several other performances.

=== Chef Line-up ===
The festival also featured a live chef demonstration area with various celebrity and noted chefs including James Martin, Gino D'Acampo, James Wong, Gennaro Contaldo and Anjum Anand.

== 2012 event ==
The 2012 event was cancelled by Doherty as he "decided there were too many other big events, such as the Olympics and the Queen's Jubilee". He stated, however, that it will return in 2013.

== Big Wheel Promotions ==
The 2009–2011 events were run by Big Wheel Promotions, who went into liquidation in 2011 owing debts of over £1 million. The event organisers have confirmed that the future of the event is safe, however.

== See also ==
- Jimmy's Farm
