= Alice Gold =

English singer-songwriter

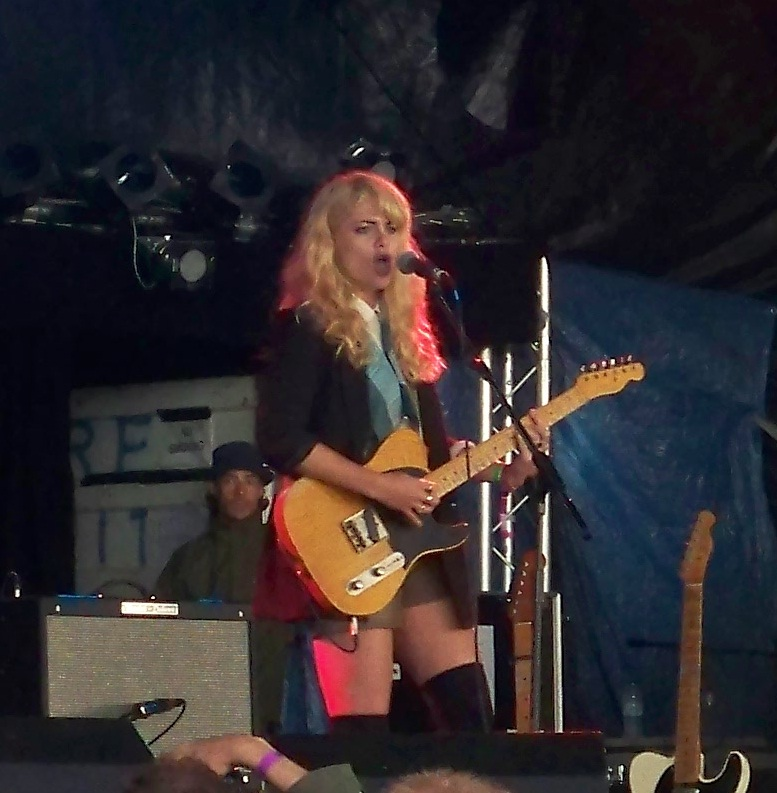
- Gold performing solo onstage at Guilfest 2011

Background information
- Born: Alice McLaughlin
- Origin: London, England
- Occupation: Singer-songwriter
- Years active: 2000s–present
- Labels: Pure Groove; Sunday Best; Fiction Records
- Website: www.alicegoldmusic.com

Alice Gold (born Alice McLaughlin) is an English singer-songwriter based in London, formerly signed to Sunday Best and currently signed to Fiction Records.

Her debut single "Dolly Figured" was released under her original name on 21 October 2007.

Her debut single as Alice Gold, "Orbiter", was released on 23 September 2010 through Pure Groove Records, with a single launch party at The Drop in Stoke Newington. The Guardian wrote that it "showcases Gold's mighty voice through its power-pop chorus" and described her as "one to watch".

Gold's debut album, Seven Rainbows, released on 4 July 2011, was produced by Dan Carey (who also produced Franz Ferdinand, Hot Chip and Lily Allen). In an interview with Pop Culture Monster, she said of the album, "the main bass, drums and guitars rhythm tracks were all recorded live and on tape like the old '60s records. The over-dubs are mostly made up of one-takes, whether it be guitar or vocal takes. My producer Dan Carey and I decided that if a take felt good then we'd keep it, so it is complete with minor 'mistakes' and quirky sounds through doing that, which we both like. It's a very honest album, quite autobiographical. The songs were born from a lot of darkness and grief but the lyrics are drenched in hope because of that, which is why I imagine people connect to it."

In October 2010, Gold was shortlisted for Q magazine's Next Big Thing award.

In September 2011, Gold's cover of the Billy Fury song "Wondrous Place" was used in an advert for the British beer brand Carling.

She has toured with Eels, Athlete, Band of Skulls, Noah and the Whale, The Twilight Singers, The Dears and The Bookhouse Boys.

Gold also played festivals in 2011, including Glastonbury, V Festival, T in the Park, Harvest at Jimmy's festival, Jodrell Bank Live, Kendal Calling, Cornbury Festival and Hull's Freedom Festival.

== Discography ==
=== Albums ===
- 2004: Laska Omnia featuring Alice McLaughlin
- 2011: Seven Rainbows

=== Singles ===
- 2010: "Orbiter" / "Kill the Lights"
- 2011: "Wondrous Place"
- 2011: "Runaway Love"
- 2011: "Cry Cry Cry"
- 2011: "End of the World" / "You'll Be Mine"

=== Featured artist ===
- 2012: "Out the Blue" (Sub Focus featuring Alice Gold)
