= Kim English =

American singer (1970–2019)

- Born: Kimberly English; September 6, 1970; Chicago, Illinois, U.S.
- Died: April 2, 2019 (aged 48) Chicago, Illinois, U.S.
- Genres: Electronic; soul; gospel; house
- Occupation: Singer
- Years active: 1994–2019
- Label: Nervous
- Website: Kim English on Myspace

Kim English (September 6, 1970 – April 2, 2019) was an American electronic, soul, gospel and house music singer.

== Early life ==
On September 6, 1970, English was born in Chicago, Illinois, U.S. English's parents were Ronald English and Annie Joyce English. English had several brothers, Eric, Richard, and Ronald Carl.

== Music career ==
Throughout her career, English experienced success on the US Hot Dance Music/Club Play, Hot Dance Singles Sales and Hot Dance Airplay charts as well as the UK Singles Chart, beginning in the mid-1990s and continuing into the 21st century. Although her first chart entry on the Hot Dance Music/Club Play came in 1995 and was only a moderate hit ("I Know a Place", No. 32), her debut single was actually "Nitelife" in 1994, produced and written by Ten City. Between 1999 and 2002, she scored six hits in a row that hit the top two. Five of those went to number one: "Unspeakable Joy", "Missing You", "Bumpin' and Jumpin'", "Everyday" and "Treat Me Right". All of these hit singles (excluding "I Know a Place") are featured on her debut album Higher Things, released in late 1998 on the New York City based record label, Nervous Records NYC. "Unspeakable Joy" and "Everyday" went on to become her most successful radio hits. The album also featured a cover version of Anita Baker's song "Been So Long".

English began as a gospel singer and many of her most popular songs contain references to God, faith and belief in oneself.

By 2007, English had earned her sixth, seventh and eighth US dance number-ones with "It Makes a Difference", "C'est La Vie" and "My Destiny". All three hits are from her second album, titled My Destiny, which was released in late September 2006. All of her hits were released on Nervous Records. September 2009 saw the release of the single "Nothing's Impossible".

== Personal life ==
English had one son, Christopher. For the last five years of her life, English had been on dialysis awaiting a kidney transplant.

On April 2, 2019, English died at the age of 48 in Chicago, Illinois. English was diagnosed with kidney failure.

== Discography ==
=== Albums ===
- Higher Things (Nervous Records NYC, 1998)
- Re-Energized (Nervous Records NYC, 2000)
- My Destiny (Nervous Records NYC, 2006)

=== Singles ===
List of singles, with selected chart positions
Year	Song	US Club/Dance	US Dance Airplay	US Dance Singles Sales	UK Singles Chart
1994	"Nitelife"	—	—	—	35
1995	"I Know a Place"	32	—	—	52
1995	"Time for Love"	—	—	—	48
1996	"Supernatural"	5	—	—	50
1997	"Learn 2 Luv"	4	—	—	—
1998	"Tomorrow"	35	—	—	—
1999	"Unspeakable Joy"	1	—	19	—
2000	"Higher Things"	2	—	18	—
2000	"Missing You"	1	—	16	—
2001	"Bumpin' & Jumpin'"	1	—	32	—
2002	"Everyday"	1	—	10	—
2002	"Treat Me Right"	1	—	12	—
2006	"It Makes a Difference"	1	10	12	—
2006	"C'est La Vie"	1	10	—	—
2007	"My Destiny"	1	20	—	—
2009	"Nothing's Impossible"	—	—	—	—

== See also ==
- List of number-one dance hits (United States)
- List of artists who reached number one on the US Dance chart
