= Alpines =

British music duo

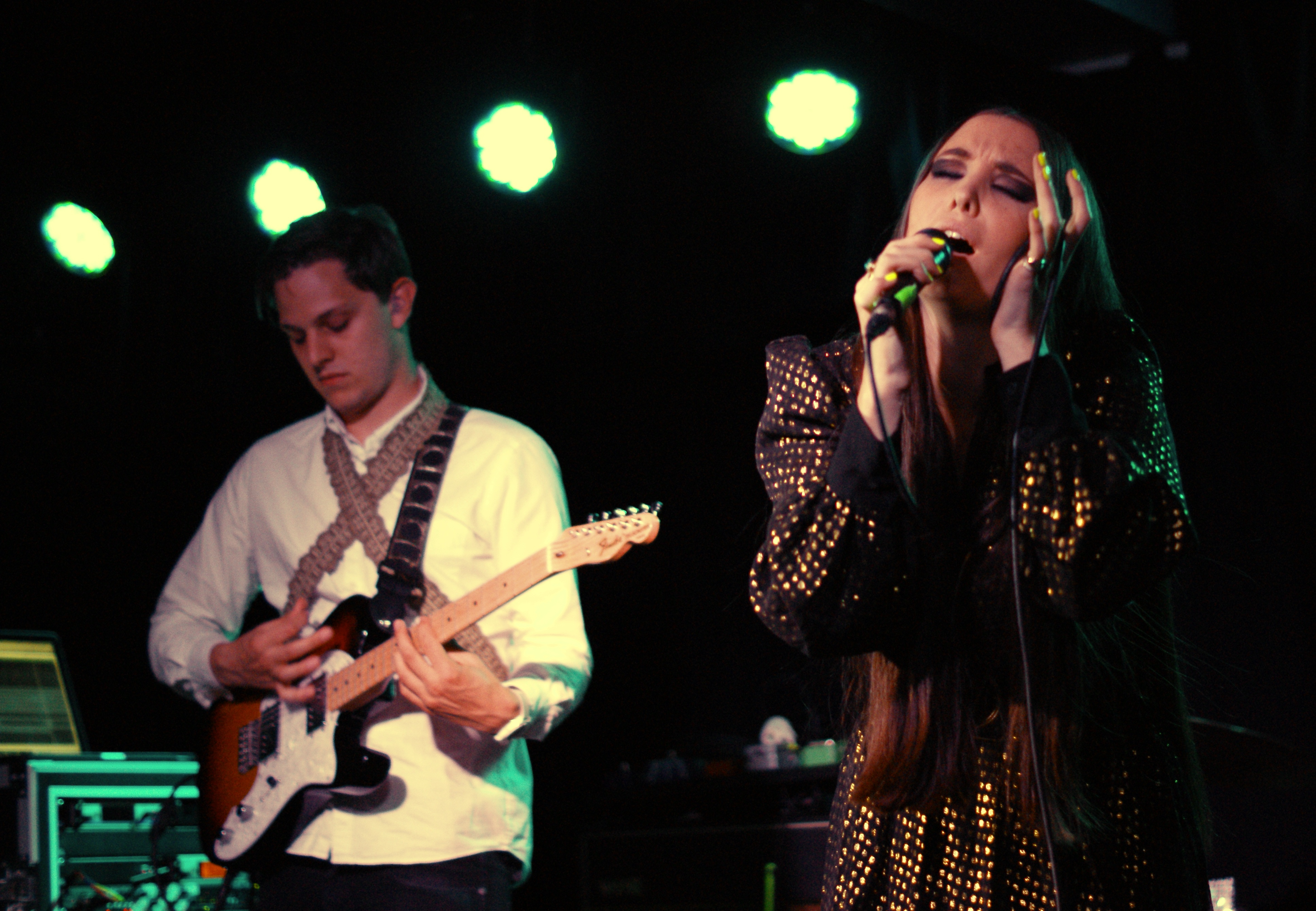
- Alpines performing at Club Academy, Manchester, 2011

Background information
- Origin: Kingston upon Thames, London
- Genres: Pop; synth-pop; soul
- Years active: 2010–present
- Labels: Polydor (2010–2012); Untrue (2012–present); Metropolis (2016)
- Members: Bob Matthews; Catherine Pockson
- Website: alpinesmusic.com

Alpines is a British duo based in Kingston upon Thames in South London, made up of Bob Matthews (guitar and production) and Catherine Pockson (pianist, singer and songwriter). Since forming in 2010, the band has toured and supported The Naked and Famous, Emeli Sandé and Florence and the Machine at the Alexandra Palace on 10 March 2012. Alpines released their debut album, Oasis on 26 May 2014 and their second album, Another River on 28 October 2016. Their third album, Full Bloom was released on their own record label Untrue Records, on 16 November 2018.

== Media ==
Their track "Drive" was used by Rankin in a video for fashion designer Hannah Marshall in 2011. In 2011, their track "Cocoon" was used during an episode of the US crime series CSI, and "Fossilised" was used in another CSI episode in 2012. Their song "Empire" which was released as a video in May 2012 was used by Sky Atlantic for the trailer of the new series of Boardwalk Empire season 3 Autumn 2012 and by ESPN for US Barclays Center Classic in November 2012.

In June 2012, "Empire" was used as transition audio in fifth episode of the eighth series of the BBC documentary series Coast, entitled "The Secret Life of Sea Cliffs".

In August 2012, their song "Got Me Wrong" from their Early Hours EP was featured in All Saints Autumn/Winter Fashion Collection TV Campaign in which Catherine and Bob also appeared. All Saints have issued Alpines Basement session videos of "Got Me Wrong" and "Chances". Alpines have continued their association with Rankin whose Hunger TV Company has produced their videos of "Got Me Wrong" and "Chances" including a studio piano performance of "Chances".

On 18 January 2013, Vogue introduced Alpines release of their single "Lights" and a mini film video of Lights featuring Emily Berrington and Ben Lloyd-Hughes directed by Ryan Hope. In September 2013, Alpines "Cocoon" was used in a short film introducing Eudon Choi's fashion collection for River Island Design Forum. In autumn 2014, "Tidal Wave" was featured in the TV and film advert "Sound with Power" for Mercedes. "Empire" was used by Starz Entertainment in the promotion of the Starz Denver Film Festival in November 2013 and for the promotion of original television and films showing on Starz TV in the US during the first quarter of 2014. On 5 June 2014, Alpines performed at the Paul Smith Beak Street Store London and in July took part in his photo shoot for Madame Figaro "Portfolio Jeunes Talents". In August 2014 Abercrombie & Fitch featured " No Other Lover" in their stores. Alpines video of "Zero" was premiered on 18 August 2014 in Hunger Magazine.

In September 2015, Alpines produced their cover version of "I Put a Spell on You" for the soundtrack of the BBC One trailer for the Hunt a new nature series narrated by David Attenborough and on 23 October 2015 released the song as a single.

In 2016, Alpines released their second album, Another River, via Metropolis Recordings and AntiFragile Records (North America).

In 2018, Alpines announced the release of their third album Full Bloom via their own record label Untrue Records, on 16 November 2018. Their first single from the album, "Out of View", was premiered on Complex.

== Songwriting and collaborations ==
Alpines have written the song "Tidal Wave" with Sub Focus. The record, which features Catherine singing, was released by Sub Focus on Mercury on 4 November 2012, and reached No. 12 in the BBC Official Singles Chart on 12 November 2012. "Tidal Wave" is also a track on Sub Focus LP Torus released on 30 September 2013. Sub Focus and Alpines were awarded a silver disc for "Tidal Wave" by the British Recorded Music Industry (BPI) on 14 February 2014. Catherine also sang on The Maccabees' LP Given to the Wild on the track "Unknow" released 9 January 2012 and sang it with them at the Little Noise Sessions in November 2012 which was shown by Channel 4 on 20 December 2012.

Catherine has co-written and sung "Fall From Grace" which is on Maya Jane Coles' debut album, Comfort, released on 1 July 2013. Alpines previously collaborated with Maya Jane Coles on their version of "Why" released on 20 March 2012, and she also produced a remix of Alpines "Cocoon" under her Nocturnal Sunshine name which was released by Alpines on 22 August 2011. Alpines co-wrote the song "The Key" which Catherine sang on Creep's album Echoes, which was released on 12 November 2013.

Alpines co-wrote the song "Love me More" with Chase & Status and Emili Sande which was released on 14 July 2017 as the lead single on Chase & Status' latest album Tribe, released on 18 August 2017.

On 3 August 2017, Alpines announced they had been chosen for an award by the Momentum Fund sponsored by PRS, PPL, the Arts Council and Spotify.

In addition to writing and producing their own music, Alpines have issued their own remixes of other artists including Lana Del Rey's "Blue Jeans" and Emile Sande's "Heaven". In 2011, Alpines also collaborated with other producers on some of their songs including "Tremors" with producer trio Dark Sky and "Gold" with Craze and Hoax.

== Oasis ==
Alpines wrote and produced all the tracks on their album Oasis with contributions from MNEK on "Blind" and "Sunset" and Vince Kidd on "Zero". The album artwork photos taken by Cyrus Mahboubian were on display at the opening of the De Re Art Gallery Hollywood from 16 May 2014 with the album sound tracking the exhibition of modern art through the summer. In 2014, Alpines toured the UK to promote the album.

== Another River ==
Alpines released two tracks from the album with accompanying videos on Vevo called "Completely" in March 2016 and "Heaven" on 31 August 2016. The album was released by Metropolis Recordings on 28 October 2016. All songs are written by Alpines who announced their first extensive headline tour of UK and European cities On 17 March 2017 they also supported the XX at the Motorsport Arena Cardiff. On 18 August 2017 Anti Fragile Records New York announced the release of a DeLuxe version of Another River which included five tracks recorded live with their band at Metropolis Studios London.

== Full Bloom ==
Alpines released their third album Full Bloom on 16 November 2018, via their own record label Untrue Records.

== Discography ==
=== Studio albums ===
| Year | Album details |
|---|---|
| 2014 | Oasis: Released: 26 May 2014; Label: Untrue Records; Format: Vinyl, CD, download |
| 2016 | Another River: Released: 28 October 2016; Label: Metropolis Recordings; Format: Vinyl, CD and download |
| 2018 | Full Bloom: Released: 16 November 2018; Label: Untrue Records; Format: Vinyl, CD and download |

=== EPs ===
| Year | Album details |
|---|---|
| 2011 | Night Drive: Released: 28 March 2011; Label: Polydor Recordings; Format: Vinyl, download |
| 2012 | Early Hours: Released: 8 October 2012; Label: Untrue Records; Format: Digital download |
| 2017 | Live at Metropolis Studios: Released: 18 August 2017; Label: Untrue Records; Format: Digital download |
| 2019 | Slow Bloom: Released: 8 February 2019; Label: Untrue Records; Format: Digital download, 12" |
| 2019 | Full Bloom (Acoustic): Released: 5 April 2019; Label: Untrue Records; Format: Digital download |

=== Singles ===
"Drive"

- Released: 28 March 2011
- Label: Polydor Recordings
- Format: Download vinyl

"Cocoon"

- Released: 22 August 2011
- Label: Polydor Recordings
- Format: Download, vinyl

"Empire"

- Released: 11 June 2012
- Label: Untrue Records
- Format: Digital download, vinyl

"Lights"

- Released 20 January 2013
- Label: Untrue Records
- Format: Download

"Oasis"

- Released: 20 January 2014
- Label: Untrue Records
- Format: Download

"No Other Lover"

- Released: April/May 2014
- Label: Untrue Records
- Format: Download

"Zero"

- Released: August 2014
- Label: Untrue Records
- Format: Download
