= Sub Focus =

English DJ and music producer (born 1982)

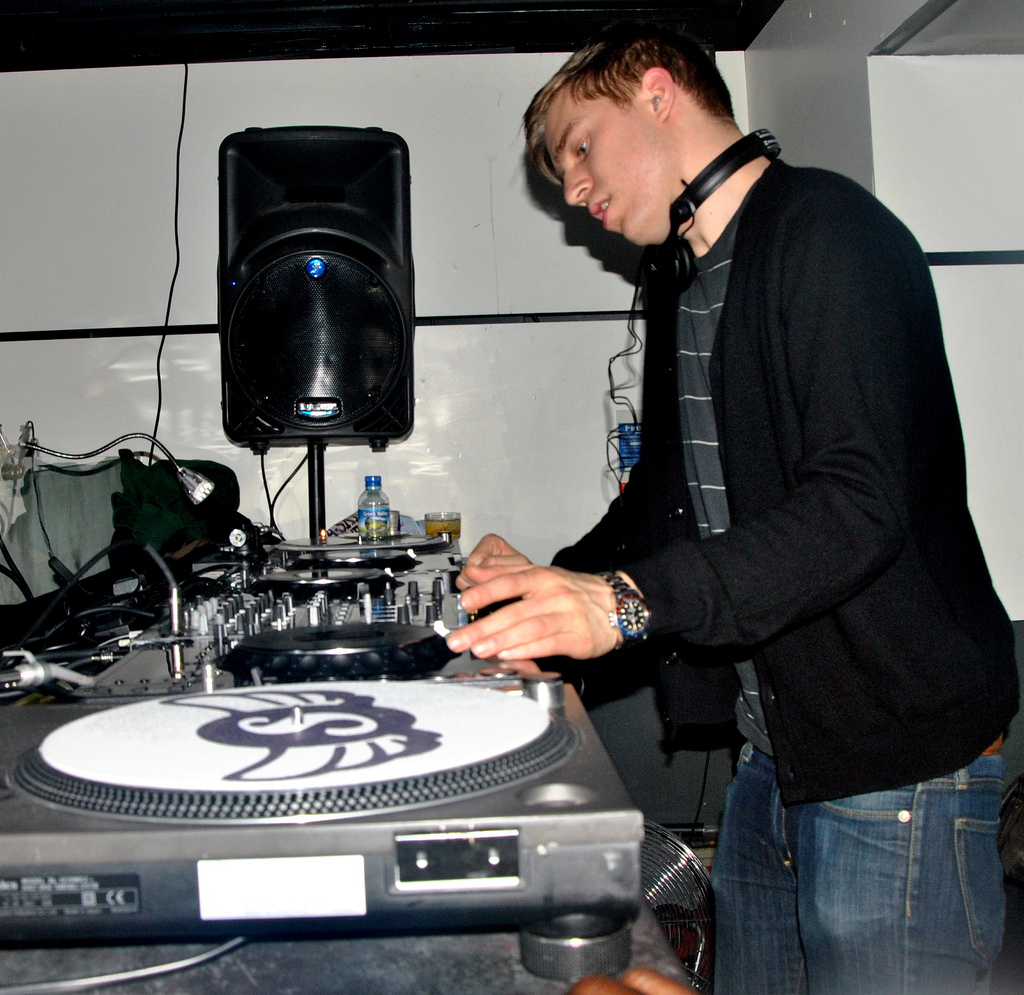
- Sub Focus in 2012

Background information
- Born: Nicolaas Douwe Douwma; 13 April 1982 (age 44)
- Origin: Guildford, Surrey, England
- Genres: Drum and bass; drumstep; dubstep; electro house; UK garage
- Occupations: DJ; music producer; songwriter; sound engineer
- Instrument: Keyboards
- Years active: 2002–present
- Labels: Virgin EMI; Mercury; RAM; Owsla; Casablanca
- Website: subfocus.com

Nicolaas Douwe Douwma (born 13 April 1982), better known by his stage name Sub Focus, is an English DJ, music producer, songwriter and sound engineer. He has been releasing records since 2003. On 12 October 2009, he released his self-titled debut album. He released his second album, Torus, on 30 September 2013. Douwma's album in collaboration with Wilkinson titled Portals was released on 9 October 2020 through Casablanca Records. His fourth album, Evolve, was released on 12 May 2023.

== Music career ==
=== Starting out ===
Originally a fan of rock music, including bands such as Nirvana, Douwma started a band at school with some friends although this was a short-lived ambition as he "wasn't very good" at playing musical instruments. At the age of 13, however, he discovered computer software for producing electronic music and became a self-taught producer, and started making rudimentary dance music. The main reason he followed this path and ultimately got more involved in it was because it meant that he could successfully create a whole song on a computer without having to be able to play a musical instrument. His first major influences were groups such as The Prodigy and The Chemical Brothers, artists who blended guitars with dance music. He first discovered jungle and drum and bass music after hearing "Incredible" by M-Beat and General Levy.

Douwma did not start taking music production seriously until he left school and deciding what to do for a career. In order to advance and to get more of an understanding of electronic music production, he went to college and studied sound engineering. From 2001 to 2002 onwards, largely due to encouragement from his friends, he started sending out demo CDs. His breakthrough came in 2003 when a friend of his who was playing in a club on the same night as RAM Records boss Andy C gave him his demo CD, with his phone number written on it (he had the CD with him so he could have some exclusive tunes to play in his set). After hearing it, Andy was so impressed with the demo, he phoned up Douwma straight away and signed every track instantly, and Douwma was signed to RAM's sister label Frequency, before making his debut on RAM two years later.

=== 2005–2008: Early career ===
In March 2005, Douwma had a number one single on the UK Dance Chart with "X-Ray / Scarecrow". The single reached number 60 on the UK Singles Chart. In June 2008, he hit number one on the UK Dance Chart again with "Timewarp / Join the Dots".

=== 2006: Sub Focus ===
In 2006, he traveled to the U.S. and played at Five Nightclub in Washington, D.C., courtesy of Upfront Productions.

=== 2009–2010: Sub Focus ===
In August 2009, he cracked the UK top 40 for the first time with "Rock It / Follow the Light", which reached number 38. "Rock It / Follow the Light" also got him a third UK Dance Chart number one, as well as reaching the B-list of BBC Radio 1's playlist. Sub Focus has also remixed selected works of The Prodigy, deadmau5, Rusko, Dr. Octagon, Empire of the Sun and Dizzee Rascal. On 6 October 2009, Sub Focus released "Smooth" which was free to download. On 12 October 2009, he released his debut studio album, Sub Focus; the album peaked at number 51 on the UK Albums Chart.

=== 2010–2019: Torus ===
In 2010, Sub Focus was a support act for Australian drum and bass band Pendulum on their UK tour to promote their third album Immersion. Later that year, he produced the Example track "Kickstarts" for his second album, Won't Go Quietly. The track was successful in the UK Singles Chart, peaking at number three. This makes it Sub Focus' most commercially successful production to date. A free track "Falling Down" featuring vocals from Kenzie May was released on his website and was later released digitally as an EP. In 2012, he released "Out the Blue" featuring Alice Gold and it reached number 23 in the UK Singles Chart. It was followed by "Tidal Wave" featuring Alpines which peaked at number 12 in the UK Singles Chart, which also became his first to spend at least two weeks in the top 40. "Tidal Wave" also featured on the Mercedes Benz "Sound with Power" advertising campaign, along with Tinie Tempah. On 12 May 2013, "Endorphins" featuring Alex Clare was released, continuing his recent chart success, peaking at number 10 in the UK Singles Chart. The album's fifth single "Turn It Around" was released on 22 September 2013 and reached number 14. His second studio album Torus was released on 30 September 2013. He headlined the Radio 1 Dance stage at the Reading and Leeds Festivals 2013. Sub Focus played at Glastonbury 2013 with his new live show setup. Later in the summer of 2013, he went on to play at Dour Festival, Reading & Leeds, Global Gathering, Bestival and Isle of Wight festival among others. He headlined BBC Radio 1Xtra Live at the Bournemouth International Centre on 7 October. He then completed a 2013 UK tour. The sixth single from Torus, "Turn Back Time", slowly climbed the UK Singles Chart to number 10. The next single from Torus, a new version of "Close" featuring a session singer instead of MNEK, failed to chart.

=== 2020–2023: Portals and Evolve ===
On 15 September 2020, Douwma announced on Twitter that a collaborative album with fellow UK artist Wilkinson would be released on 9 October of that year. The album was made available for pre-order on CD and vinyl. Portals' tracklist was revealed by Douwma on 17 September. It contains 11 tracks, including the four singles "Air I Breathe", "Illuminate", "Just Hold On" and "Turn the Lights Off".

On 8 March 2023, Douwma announced a third solo album Evolve, which was released on 12 May 2023. The album contains 14 tracks including the singles "Vibration (One More Time)" featuring AR/CO, "Ready to Fly" with Dimension and "Off the Ground". The album won "Best Album" at the Drum and Bass Arena Awards in 2023.

=== 2024–present: Contact and later releases ===
On 14 March 2025, Douwma released the banger "On & On" featuring bbyclose, in the lead-up to his fourth studio album Contact. On 28 September 2025, he announced Contact, saying it was his fourth studio album and that it would be released on 21 November 2025. The album was released as a 14-track record and includes collaborations with artists such as Fireboy DML, IRAH, Katy B and Emily Makis.

== Discography ==
- Sub Focus (2009)
- Torus (2013)
- Portals (2020) (with Wilkinson)
- Evolve (2023)
- Contact (2025)
