= RAM Records =

British independent record label

- Parent company: BMG Rights Management
- Founded: 1992
- Founder: Andy C; Ant Miles
- Distributor: Universal Music Group (physical) BMG Rights Management (digital)
- Genre: Drum and bass
- Country of origin: United Kingdom
- Location: Hornchurch, London, England
- Official website: ramrecords.com

RAM Records is an independent record label established in 1992 by Andy C with the help of his friend Ant Miles. It specialises in drum and bass.

The label and business is run by Andy C and business partner Scott Bourne (Red One). Ram Records is known for its label activities, the music it releases, and the artists it has signed over the years. Moving Fusion's Turbulence was instrumental in moving RAM forward in the early 2000s and was the number one voted-for track in drum and bass at the Mercury Music Prize in 2000. As well as Ram's musical output, the label is also known for its club nights, the most famous of which started at the London nightclub 'The End', and lasted 11 years until the club's closure in December 2008. Moving on from The End to super-club Matter in February 2009, Ram's attendees tripled from 1000 to over 3000 people within 2 months and lasted until Matter's closure in June 2010. Ram's new home is Fabric nightclub in Farringdon, London.

In 2002 RAM launched a sister label called Frequency, and in 2012 a new label called PROGRAM was launched, specialising in different flavours of drum and bass compared to the signature sounds of RAM. The first PROGRAM release was "Firethorn / Pandorum" by Frankee.

Some RAM signees have found chart success. Andy C, Chase & Status, René LaVice, Sub Focus and Wilkinson have all released singles through RAM which entered the UK Singles Chart.

== Artists ==
- ALB
- Andy C
- Ant Miles
- Audio
- Bad Company UK
- Bensley
- Calyx and TeeBee
- Camo & Krooked
- Chase & Status
- Chords
- Culture Shock
- DC Breaks
- Delta Heavy
- DJ Empress
- Frankee
- Hamilton
- Junk Mail
- Kallan HK
- Killbox
- Loadstar
- Magnetude
- Millbrook
- Mind Vortex
- Mob Tactics
- Moving Fusion
- Original Sin
- Raiser
- René LaVice
- Shanks
- Shimon
- Skantia
- Sound In Noise
- Stealth
- Sub Focus
- SyRan
- Tall Order
- Upgrade
- Wilkinson
