= Chase & Status discography =

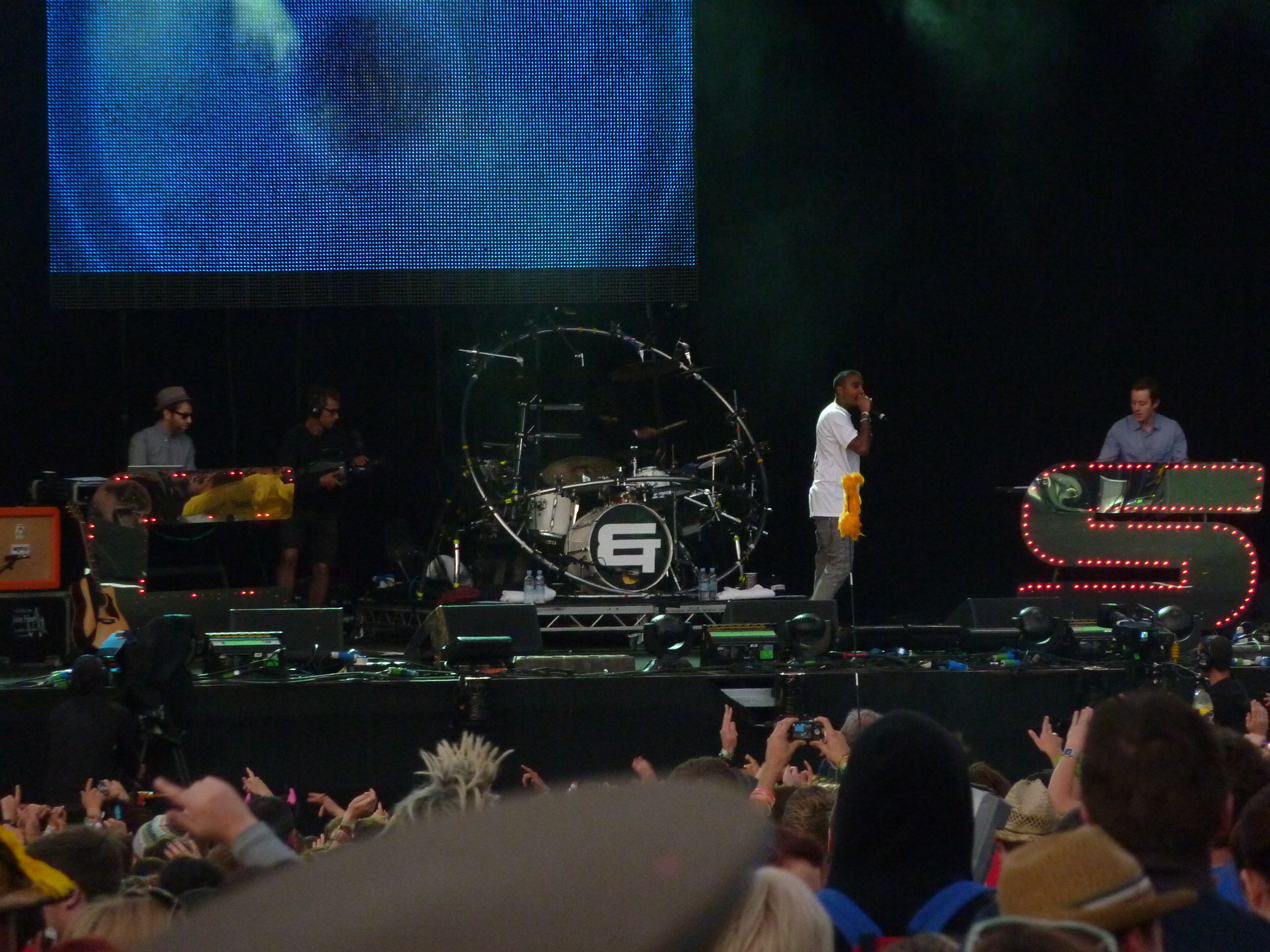
- Chase & Status at Bestival 2010
- Studio albums: 7
- Extended plays: 3
- Singles: 38
- Promotional singles: 8
- Mixtapes: 2

This is a listing of official releases by Chase & Status, an English drum and bass production duo from London consisting of Saul Milton and Will Kennard.

Chase & Status had three number-one singles on the UK Dance Chart between 2007 and 2009; the double A-side "Hurt You" / "Sell Me Your Soul" in 2007 and "Take Me Away" / "Judgement (Informer)" in 2008 were two of them. On 5 October 2008, they reached number seventy on the UK Singles Chart and number one on the UK Dance Chart again with their single "Pieces" featuring vocals from Plan B. In 2009, they peaked at number forty five with "Against All Odds", which featured UK rapper Kano. After this, Chase & Status' style changed from more 'liquid' drum and bass songs, such as "Take U There" (featuring Digga), to a more commercialised sound, reminiscent of club/dance music. Chase & Status' first album, More than Alot, debuted on the UK Albums Chart at number forty nine in October 2008 and the UK Dance Album Chart at number two.

In November 2009, the duo entered the top forty of the UK Singles Chart for the first time with the track "End Credits". The track was released on 2 November 2009 and featuring Plan B, it reached a peak of number nine on the UK Singles Chart. The duo then released "Let You Go" on 15 August 2010, revealing it to be the second official single to be released from their second studio album No More Idols. The single featured vocals from Mali and debuted at number eleven on the UK Singles Chart, marking the duo's second consecutive top 40 hit. The fourth single from the album is "Blind Faith", which features soul singer and songwriter Liam Bailey and was released in January 2011. Other singles include "Time" (featuring Delilah), "Hitz" (featuring Tinie Tempah) and "Flashing Lights" (with Sub Focus featuring Takura). The album debuted at number two on the UK Albums Chart and was certified gold in the first week of sales by the British Phonographic Industry.

The lead single from their third studio album Brand New Machine, entitled "Lost & Not Found", features Louis M^ttrs and was released on 26 June. The album's second single "Count on Me" featuring Moko premiered on B.Traits' BBC Radio 1. It was released on 29 September, reaching number five in the UK Singles Chart. The album was released on 7 October. The third single from Brand New Machine, "Alive", was released on 15 December 2013. It peaked at number 21 on the UK Singles Chart. The album's fourth single, "Blk & Blu", features vocals from Ed Thomas and was released on 24 March 2014.

== Albums ==
=== Studio albums ===
Title	Details	Peak chart positions							Certifications (sales thresholds)
Title	Details	UK	UK Dance	AUS	BEL	DEN	IRE	NZ	Certifications (sales thresholds)
More than Alot	Released: 13 October 2008; Label: RAM; Formats: CD, digital download	49	2	—	—	—	—	—	BPI: Gold
No More Idols	Released: 31 January 2011; Label: Mercury; Formats: CD, digital download	2	1	93	36	34	50	29	BPI: 3× Platinum
Brand New Machine	Released: 7 October 2013; Label: MTA, Mercury; Formats: CD, digital download	2	1	38	55	—	83	26	BPI: Gold
Tribe	Released: 18 August 2017; Label: MTA, Mercury; Formats: CD, digital download	7	2	—	160	—	—	—	BPI: Silver
Rtrn II Jungle	Released: 31 May 2019; Label: Virgin EMI, Mercury; Formats: CD, digital download	12	1	—	—	—	—	—	BPI: Silver
What Came Before	Released: 10 June 2022; Label: Virgin EMI, Mercury; Formats: CD, digital download	4	1	—	—	—	—	—	
Generic Everything	Released: 9 October 2026; Label: Warner Music; Formats: CD, digital download	2	1	9	17	—	—	5	
"—" denotes that the release did not chart or was not released in that territory.

=== Mixtapes ===
Title	Details	Peak chart positions			Certifications (sales thresholds)
Title	Details	UK	BEL	NZ	Certifications (sales thresholds)
Bingo Beats Vol. 6 (Note: Mixed by Chase & Status)	Released: 17 March 2006; Label: Bingo Beats; Format: CD	—	—	—	
2 Ruff, Vol. 1	Released: 10 November 2023; Label: Virgin EMI, Mercury; Format: CD, vinyl, digital download	4	72	17	BPI: Silver
"—" denotes that the release did not chart or was not released in that territory.

== Extended plays ==
Title	Details	Peak chart positions
Title	Details	UK Dance
Ten Tonne	Released: 17 October 2005; Label: Renegade Hardware; Formats: Digital download	—
The Druids	Released: 20 February 2006; Label: Bingo Beats; Formats: Digital download	22
London Bars	Released: 4 December 2015; Label: Mercury; Format: Digital download	—
"—" denotes release that did not chart.

== Singles ==
=== As lead artist ===
Title	Year	Peak chart positions							Certifications (sales thresholds)	Album
Title	Year	UK	UK Dance	BEL	DEN	IRE	NZ	SCO	Certifications (sales thresholds)	Album
"Duppy Man" / "Top Shotta" (Note: "Duppy Man" features vocals from Capleton alone. "Top Shotta" features vocals from Riko Dan, Trim and Scratchy.) (featuring Capleton / Riko Dan, Trim and Scratchy)	2005	94	3	—	—	—	—	—		Non-album singles
"Dumpling Riddim" / "Disco" (Note: "Dumpling Riddim" and "Disco" were released as a double A-side in the United Kingdom, though only "Dumpling Riddim" features the British musician Riko Dan.) (featuring Riko Dan)	2007	—	—	—	—	—	—	—		Non-album singles
"Hurt You" / "Sell Me Your Soul" (Note: "Hurt You" and "Sell Me Your Soul" were released as a double A-side in the United Kingdom, though only "Hurt You" is featured in the album.)	2007	—	1	—	—	—	—	—		More than Alot
"Take Me Away" / "Judgement (Informer)" (Note: "Take Me Away" and "Judgement (Informer)" were released as a double A-side in the United Kingdom, though only "Take Me Away" is featured in the album.)	2008	—	1	—	—	—	—	—	BPI: Silver	More than Alot
"Pieces" / "Eastern Jam" (Note: "Pieces" and "Eastern Jam" were released as a double A-side in the United Kingdom, though only "Pieces" features the British musician Plan B.) (featuring Plan B)	2008	70	1	—	—	—	—	—	BPI: Silver	More than Alot
"Against All Odds" / "Saxon" (Note: "Against All Odds" and "Saxon" were released as a double A-side in the United Kingdom, though only "Against All Odds" features the British rapper Kano.) (featuring Kano)	2009	45	2	—	—	—	—	—		More than Alot
"End Credits" (featuring Plan B)	2009	9	2	46	—	—	—	13	BPI: 2× Platinum; RMNZ: Platinum	No More Idols
"Let You Go" (featuring Mali)	2010	11	3	—	—	—	—	13	BPI: Silver	No More Idols
"Blind Faith" (featuring Liam Bailey)	2011	5	1	59	24	—	—	5	BPI: 2× Platinum; RMNZ: Gold	No More Idols
"Time" (featuring Delilah)	2011	21	6	14	—	—	—	25	BPI: Platinum	No More Idols
"Hitz" (featuring Tinie Tempah)	2011	39	11	—	—	—	—	—	BPI: Silver	No More Idols
"Flashing Lights" (with Sub Focus featuring Takura)	2011	98	14	89	—	—	—	—		No More Idols
"Lost & Not Found" (featuring Louis M^ttrs)	2013	9	2	72	—	—	—	11	BPI: Gold	Brand New Machine
"Count on Me" (featuring Moko)	2013	5	1	33	—	49	—	7	BPI: Gold	Brand New Machine
"Alive" (featuring Jacob Banks)	2013	21	11	73	—	—	—	26	BPI: Gold	Brand New Machine
"Blk & Blu" (featuring Ed Thomas)	2014	48	14	68	—	—	—	—		Brand New Machine
"Funny" (featuring Frisco)	2015	96	27	—	—	—	—	—		London Bars
"More Ratatatin" (featuring Giggs)	2015	—	—	—	—	—	—	—		London Bars
"Wha Gwarn?" (featuring Bonkaz)	2015	146	—	—	—	—	—	—		London Bars
"Bigger Man Sound" (featuring Novelist)	2015	161	—	—	—	—	—	—		London Bars
"Control" (featuring Slaves)	2016	—	—	—	—	—	—	—		Tribe
"NRG" (featuring Novelist)	2016	—	—	—	—	—	—	—		Tribe
"Spoken Word" (featuring George the Poet)	2016	78	23	—	—	—	—	—		Non-album single
"All Goes Wrong" (featuring Tom Grennan)	2016	65	22	53	—	—	—	40	BPI: Platinum; RMNZ: Gold	Tribe
"This Moment" (with Blossoms)	2017	—	—	—	—	—	—	—		Tribe
"Love Me More" (featuring Emeli Sandé)	2017	—	32	85	—	—	—	84		Tribe
"Retreat2018" / "Heater" (featuring Cutty Ranks / General Levy)	2018	—	—	—	—	—	—	—		Rtrn II Jungle
"Delete" / "Big Man Skank" (VIP) (featuring Burro Banton / Mr. Vegas)	2018	—	—	—	—	—	—	—		Rtrn II Jungle
"Program" (featuring Irah)	2019	—	—	—	—	—	—	—	BPI: Silver; RMNZ: Gold	Rtrn II Jungle
"Murder Music" (featuring Kabaka Pyramid)	2019	—	—	—	—	—	—	—		Rtrn II Jungle
"When It Rains" (featuring BackRoad Gee)	2022	—	—	—	—	—	—	*		What Came Before
"Don't Be Scared" (featuring Takura)	2022	—	—	—	—	—	—	*		What Came Before
"Mixed Emotions" (featuring Clementine Douglas)	2022	44	15	—	—	—	—	*	BPI: Gold; RMNZ: Gold	What Came Before
"Disconnect" (with Becky Hill)	2023	6	2	—	—	26	29	*	BPI: 2× Platinum; RMNZ: Platinum	Believe Me Now?
"Baddadan" (featuring Bou, Irah, Flowdan, Trigga and Takura)	2023	5	2	—	—	58	19	*	BPI: 2× Platinum; RMNZ: 2× Platinum	2 Ruff, Vol. 1
"Liquor & Cigarettes" (featuring Hedex and ArrDee)	2023	17	6	—	—	—	— (Note: "Liquor & Cigarettes" did not enter the NZ Top 40 Singles Chart, but peaked at number seven on the NZ Hot Singles Chart.)	*	BPI: Gold; RMNZ: Gold	2 Ruff, Vol. 1
"Say the Word" (featuring Clementine Douglas)	2023	78	32	—	—	—	— (Note: "Say the Word" did not enter the NZ Top 40 Singles Chart, but peaked at number nine on the NZ Hot Singles Chart.)	*		2 Ruff, Vol. 1
"Selecta" (featuring Stefflon Don)	2023	27	9	—	—	—	— (Note: "Selecta" did not enter the NZ Top 40 Singles Chart, but peaked at number six on the NZ Hot Singles Chart.)	*	BPI: Silver	2 Ruff, Vol. 1
"Backbone" (with Stormzy)	2024	1	1	—	—	54	3	*	BPI: Platinum; RMNZ: 2× Platinum	Non-album singles
"Through the Pain" (featuring Pozer)	2026	—	—	—	—	—	—	*		Non-album singles
"Doin' It More" (featuring Blade Brown)	2026	—	—	—	—	—	— (Note: "Doin' It More" did not enter the NZ Top 40 Singles Chart, but peaked at number 30 on the NZ Hot Singles Chart.)	*		Non-album singles
"Homework" (with Lancey Foux)	2026	—	—	—	—	—	— (Note: "Homework" did not enter the NZ Top 40 Singles Chart, but peaked at number 16 on the NZ Hot Singles Chart.)	*		Non-album singles
"Disgruntled" (featuring J Hus and Irah)	2026	85	25	—	—	—	— (Note: "Disgruntled" did not enter the NZ Top 40 Singles Chart, but peaked at number 7 on the NZ Hot 40 Singles Chart.)	*		Generic Everything
"Gone Too Far" (featuring Debbie)	2026	—	—	—	—	—	— (Note: "Gone Too Far" did not enter the NZ Top 40 Singles Chart, but peaked at number 9 on the NZ Hot 40 Singles Chart.)	*		Generic Everything
"Essa Ta Quente" (with Skrillex)	2026	—	—	—	—	—	— (Note: "Essa Ta Quente" did not enter the NZ Top 40 Singles Chart, but peaked at number 24 on the NZ Hot 40 Singles Chart.)	*		Generic Everything
"—" denotes that the release did not chart or was not released in that territory. "*" denotes period where chart did not exist.

=== As featured artist ===
Title	Year	Peak chart positions	Album
Title	Year	UK Dance	Album
"Tek Your Time" (Doktor featuring Chase & Status)	2010	—	Non-album singles
"Gunfinger (Salute)" (with Irah)	2024	24	Non-album singles
"Innocent Smile" (Skepta featuring Suggs and Chase & Status)	2026	—	TBA

=== Promotional singles ===
Title	Year	Peak chart positions		Certifications	Album
Title	Year	UK	UK Dance	Certifications	Album
"Hypest Hype" (featuring Tempa T)	2011	70	7	BPI: Silver	No More Idols
"Big Man" (featuring Liam Bailey)	2013	68	13		Non-album single
"Machine Gun" (featuring Pusha T)	2013	114	21		Brand New Machine
"International" (featuring Cutty Ranks)	2014	116	22		Brand New Machine
"Tribes"	2016	—	—		Tribe
"Weed & Rum" (featuring Masicka)	2019	—	—		Rtrn II Jungle
"Engage"	2020	—	—		Fabric presents: Chase & Status – Rtrn II Fabric
"Wherever I May Roam" (cover) (featuring BackRoad Gee)	2021	—	—		The Metallica Blacklist
"—" denotes that the release did not chart or was not released in that territory.

== Other charted and certified songs ==
Year	Title	Peak chart positions			Certifications	Album
Year	Title	UK	UK Dance	NZ Hot	Certifications	Album
2011	"No Problem"	—	31	—	BPI: Gold; RMNZ: Gold	No More Idols
2022	"Censor" (featuring Popcaan and Irah)	—	—	36		What Came Before
2022	"Hold Your Ground" (featuring Ethan Holt)	—	—	25		What Came Before
2023	"On the Block" (featuring Savo and Horrid1)	—	—	27		2 Ruff, Vol. 1
2023	"2Ruff" (featuring Takura)	—	—	37		2 Ruff, Vol. 1
2023	"Tough Talk" (featuring Kwengface)	—	—	39		2 Ruff, Vol. 1
2026	"Tension" (featuring Saam Sultan)	—	—	16		Generic Everything
2026	"Carnage" (featuring Little Simz)	67	13	1		Generic Everything
2026	"Juggin" (featuring Blanco and Finesse Kid)	—	—	15		Generic Everything
"—" denotes that the release did not chart or was not released in that territory.

== Production discography ==
=== Productions ===
Year	Title	Album	Artist
2006	"In Love"	For Lost Friends	Jenna G
2009	"Snoop Dogg Millionaire"	Dubstep LA: Embrace The Renaissance Vol. 1	Snoop Dogg
2009	"Express Urself"	Catch 22	Tinchy Stryder
2009	"Nothing But the Girl"	Overcome	Alexandra Burke
2009	"Mad House"	Rated R	Rihanna
2009	"Wait Your Turn"	Rated R	Rihanna
2009	"G4L"	Rated R	Rihanna
2009	"Pink Notes"	Unreleased	Example
2010	"Sick Note"	Won't Go Quietly	Example
2010	"Spaceship"	Method to the Maadness	Kano
2011	"Playing in the Shadows"	Playing in the Shadows	Example
2011	"Red Lipstick"	Talk That Talk	Rihanna
2012	"R.I.P."	Ora	Rita Ora
2012	"Jump"	Unapologetic	Rihanna
2012	"Network"	Non-album single	Dream Mclean
2013	"Mosh Pit"	Demonstration	Tinie Tempah
2014	"Your Love"	Gold EP	Moko
2014	"Fletcher"	It's Bait, It's Bait	Tempa T
2014	"Pharoah"	Greyscale	Dream Mclean
2016	"Sun City"	Non-album single	Jammer
2016	"Not A Rocker"	Non-album single	Tempa T
2016	"Too Much Drugs"	Non-album single	CASisDEAD
2023	"Rampage"	Zero Experience	Venbee and DJ SS
2024	"Pressure"	The Glorification of Sadness	Paloma Faith and Kojey Radical
2024	"Right Here"	Believe Me Now?	Becky Hill

=== Remixes ===
Year	Title	Artist
2004	"20/20"	Future Cut
2005	"Bullshit"	Akala
2005	"Everyday"	Shy FX and T Power featuring Top Cat
2005	"I Got Love"	Mood II Swing
2007	"No Good"	Plan B
2007	"Sirens"	Dizzee Rascal
2007	"Hot Stuff (Let's Dance)"	Craig David
2007	"Represents"	Brockie and Ed Solo
2008	"Leap of Faith"	Hadouken!
2008	"Invaders Must Die"	The Prodigy
2009	"Ruffest Gun Ark"	Top Cat
2009	"Death"	White Lies
2009	"Heartbeat"	Nneka
2009	"Girl Can't Dance"	Example
2010	"Prayin'"	Plan B
2010	"Is It Worth It" (VIP mix)	Chase & Status
2011	"The Last Dance"	Clare Maguire
2011	"Rope" (Live Lounge)	Foo Fighters
2011	"Brixton Briefcase" (VIP mix) (featuring D Double E)	Chase & Status
2012	"Killing in the Name" (live)	Rage Against the Machine
2012	"Network"	Dream Mclean
2013	"When Will They Learn?"	Liam Bailey
2013	"No Problem" (VIP mixes)	Chase & Status
2016	"Fade" (Live Lounge) (featuring Tom Grennan)	Kanye West
2017	"This Moment" (C&S Back to the Rave remix)	Chase & Status and Blossoms
2017	"Valley of the Shadows"	Origin Unknown
2019	"Chalice"	Donae'o
2019	"Original Nuttah 25" (featuring Irah)	UK Apache and Shy FX
2022	"Getting Started"	Sam Fender
2022	"Our Time Will Come"	Carl Cox
