= Machine Gun (disambiguation) =

The machine gun is a type of automatic firearm. Colloquially the term may refer to the broader category of automatic firearms.

Machine Gun may also refer to:

== Music ==
- Machine Gun (band), an American jazz group
- Randy Hansen's Machine Gun, an American band (1977–1980) named for the Jimi Hendrix song (see below)

=== Albums ===
- Machine Gun (Commodores album) or the title song, 1974
- Machine Gun (Peter Brötzmann album) or the title song, 1968
- Machine Gun: The Fillmore East First Show, by Jimi Hendrix; recorded 1969, released 2016

=== Songs ===
- "Machine Gun" (Chase & Status song), 2013
- "Machine Gun" (Commodores song), 1974
- "Machine Gun" (Jimi Hendrix song), 1970
- "Machine Gun" (Portishead song), 2008
- "Machine Gun" (Warrant song), 1992
- "Machine Gun", by Big Bad Voodoo Daddy from Big Bad Voodoo Daddy, 1994
- "Machine Gun", by Saxon from Wheels of Steel, 1980
- "Machine Gun", by Slowdive from Souvlaki, 1993

== Nickname or ring name ==
- Machine Gun Kelly (disambiguation), several people, and other uses
- Karl Anderson (born 1980), ring name "The Machine Gun", American professional wrestler
- Lou Butera (born 1937), American Hall-of-Fame pool player
- Dennis Thompson (drummer) (born 1948), American rock drummer
- The Motor City Machineguns, a professional wrestling tag team from Detroit, Michigan

== See also ==
- Machine pistol
- Submachine gun
- Gatling gun
- Ray "Gunner" Kelly (1906-1977), Australian police officer
