= Lighting Matches =

Studio album by Tom Grennan
- Released: 6 July 2018
- Recorded: 2016–2018
- Genre: Indie rock; pop rock
- Length: 41:43
- Label: Insanity
- Producer: Charlie Hugall; Jimmy Hogarth; Joel Pott; Laconic; Joe Rubel; Jordan Riley; Eg White; Samuel Dixon; Fraser T Smith; Peter Stengaard; Chase & Status

Tom Grennan chronology
Found What I've Been Looking For (2017)	Lighting Matches (2018)	Evering Road (2021)

Singles from Lighting Matches
- 1. "Royal Highness" Released: September 2017; 2. "I Might" Released: December 2017; 3. "Sober" Released: February 2018; 4. "Barbed Wire" Released: June 2018; 5. "Run in the Rain" Released: November 2018

Lighting Matches is the debut studio album by English singer-songwriter Tom Grennan, released on 6 July 2018 through Insanity Records. The album spawned five singles, and includes three singles, released on Grennan's previously three EPs.

== Critical reception ==
Professional ratings
Aggregate scores
Source	Rating
Metacritic	79/100
Review scores
Source	Rating
Clash	5/10
The Independent	4/5 stars
NME	4/5 stars

Lighting Matches was generally well received by critics. NME critic Andrew Trendell said that the album "makes Bedford sound like Hollywood" and that Grennan "knows what he's doing". However, Clash critic Nick Roseblade said that the album "isn't a bad album, but sadly it doesn't excel either" and that "it all feels a little too rehearsed and sanitised in its delivery."

== Track listing ==
No.	Title	Writer(s)	Producer(s)	Length
1.	"Found What I've Been Looking For"	Thomas Grennan; Jordan Riley	Charlie Hugall; Jordan Riley	3:11
2.	"Royal Highness"	Grennan; Jonny Lattimer; Ashley Milton; Daniel Goudie	Laconic; Joe Rubel	3:13
3.	"Barbed Wire"	Grennan; Danny Connors	Hugall	3:05
4.	"Run in the Rain"	Grennan; Amy Wadge; Adriano Buffone	Jimmy Hogarth	3:57
5.	"Aboard"	Grennan; Lattimer; Francis White	Eg White	3:53
6.	"Lighting Matches"	Grennan; Lattimer; Jimmy Hogarth	Hogarth	3:29
7.	"Lucky Ones"	Grennan; Patrick Byrne	Samuel Dixon	3:33
8.	"Sober"	Grennan; Fraser Thornycroft-Smith; Lattimer	Fraser T Smith	3:42
9.	"I Might"	Diane Warren	Peter Stengaard	2:53
10.	"Make 'Em Like You"	Grennan; Joel Pott	Pott	3:39
11.	"Something in the Water"	Grennan	Hugall	3:27
12.	"Little by Little Love"	Grennan; Pott	Pott	3:41
Total length:				41:43

Deluxe edition CD
No.	Title	Writer(s)	Producer(s)	Length
13.	"Praying"	Grennan; Charlie Hugall; Tre Jean-Marie; Jacob Attwooll	Hugall	3:06
14.	"Secret Lover"	Grennan; Pott	Pott	3:58
15.	"Sweet Hallelujah"	Grennan	Hugall	3:48
16.	"All Goes Wrong" (with Chase & Status)	William Kennard; Saul Milton; Grennan; Kieron McIntosh; Dean McIntosh; Nathaniel Ledwidge	Chase & Status	3:43

== Chart performance ==
Chart (2018)	Peak position
Belgian Albums (Ultratop Flanders)	191
German Albums (Offizielle Top 100)	60
Irish Albums (OCC)	28
Scottish Albums (OCC)	6
UK Albums (OCC)	5

== Certifications ==
Region	Certification	Certified units/sales
United Kingdom (BPI)	Gold	100,000^{‡}
^{‡} Sales+streaming figures based on certification alone.
