= Bubblin' =

Bubblin' may refer to:

- "Bubblin" (Anderson Paak song), 2018
- "Bubblin'" (Blue song), 2004
- "Bubblin'" (Cru song), 1997
- "Bubblin'", a song by Boris from the album Live My Life, 2009

== See also ==
- "Bubblin, Bubblin (Piña Colada)" a song by Rahzel on Make the Music 2000
- "Bubbling Over", a song by Percy Faith
- Bubbling Brown Sugar, musical
- Bubble (disambiguation)
