= Walk the Line (TV series) =

British television series

- Genre: Music game show
- Developed by: Syco and Lifted
- Written by: David Ajao; Kevin Day
- Creative director: Lee McNicholas (Lifted)
- Presented by: Maya Jama
- Judges: Gary Barlow; Craig David; Dawn French; Alesha Dixon
- Theme music composer: Nigel Butler; Simon Cowell; Ray Hedges
- Country of origin: United Kingdom
- Original language: English
- No. of series: 1
- No. of episodes: 6

Production
- Executive producer: Paula Thomas Gallie
- Camera setup: Multi-camera
- Running time: 60–75 minutes (inc. adverts)
- Production companies: Lifted Entertainment; Syco Entertainment

Original release
- Network: ITV
- Release: 12 December – 17 December 2021

Walk the Line is a British music competition television series created and produced by Lifted Entertainment and Syco Entertainment. The ITV programme is presented by Maya Jama with a judging panel consisting of Gary Barlow, Craig David, Dawn French and Alesha Dixon. Simon Cowell was originally set to be the head judge on the panel, but was replaced by Barlow.

On 24 August 2022, it was announced that the series had been cancelled after one series.

== Format ==
Walk the Line is a music competition where five music acts appear and compete for the grand final prize of £500,000. However, instead of going straight into the final, the winner of an episode has to decide whether to come back the next night to perform again with the risk of being dropped from the competition at that point. If they do not want to take that risk then they can take a monetary prize (£10,000 in the first episode, with the prize increasing by a further £10,000 each night), with the runner-up continuing on towards the grand prize by competing in the next episode.

== Episode winners ==
The winner of the first three episodes was Bristol-born singer Ella Rothwell, who has previously released singles such as "Stop Calling", "Freedom" and "Velvet Heart" under the name Rothwell.

The winner of the fourth, fifth and final episode was London-based singer Nadiah Adu-Gyamfi, who has featured under the stage-name "Moko" on two singles by electronic music duo, Chase & Status including on the UK Top 5 hit single "Count On Me". Nadiah "Walked the Line" one final time in the last episode and won the audience vote, taking home the £500,000 jackpot.

=== Results summary ===
Colour key

–	Act received the most public votes and walked the line
–	Act received the second most votes and was in the top 2 but was eliminated
–	Act cashed out of the competition
–	Act was eliminated

Daily results per act
Act	Episode 1	Episode 2	Episode 3	Episode 4	Episode 5	Episode 6
Nadiah Adu-Gyamfi	—N/a			1st Advanced	1st Walked the Line	Winner; Walked the Line
Scarlet Thomas	—N/a					2nd Eliminated
Beatbox Collective	—N/a					Eliminated
Greg Charles	—N/a					Eliminated
Rodney Earl Clarke	—N/a					Eliminated
Luke Burr	—N/a				2nd Eliminated	Eliminated (Episode 5)
Chanel Haynes	—N/a				Eliminated	Eliminated (Episode 5)
Jamie Hannah	—N/a				Eliminated	Eliminated (Episode 5)
Vincent Bugozi	—N/a				Eliminated	Eliminated (Episode 5)
Ella Rothwell	1st Advanced	1st Walked the Line	1st Walked the Line	Cashed Out with £40,000	Eliminated (Episode 4)	
ADMT	—N/a			Eliminated	Eliminated (Episode 4)	
Anthony Stuart Lloyd	—N/a			Eliminated	Eliminated (Episode 4)	
Deco	—N/a			Eliminated	Eliminated (Episode 4)	
Raynes	—N/a		2nd Eliminated	Eliminated (Episode 3)		
Abz Winter	—N/a		Eliminated	Eliminated (Episode 3)		
Daniel Arieleno	—N/a		Eliminated	Eliminated (Episode 3)		
Lisa-Marie Holmes	—N/a		Eliminated	Eliminated (Episode 3)		
Darby	—N/a	2nd Eliminated	Eliminated (Episode 2)			
Carly Burns	—N/a	Eliminated	Eliminated (Episode 2)			
Ida Girls	—N/a	Eliminated	Eliminated (Episode 2)			
Youngr	—N/a	Eliminated	Eliminated (Episode 2)			
A.J. Brown	2nd Eliminated	Eliminated (Episode 1)				
Brendan Riley	Eliminated	Eliminated (Episode 1)				
Eloise Viola	Eliminated	Eliminated (Episode 1)				
Queenz	Eliminated	Eliminated (Episode 1)				

== Episodes ==
– The singer received the most votes
– The singer received the second highest votes
– The singer cashed out of the competition

=== Episode 1 (12 December) ===
Acts' performances on the first episode
Order	Act	Age	Song	Result
1	A.J. Brown	31	"God Only Knows"	Top 2 (Eliminated)
2	Queenz	Various	"Queen of the Night"	Eliminated
3	Eloise Viola	26	"Bad Habits"	Eliminated
4	Brendan Reilly	38	"Purple Rain"	Eliminated
5	Ella Rothwell	28	"I Wonder If You're Happy" (original song)	Winner (Walked the Line)

=== Episode 2 (13 December) ===
Acts' performances on the second episode
Order	Act	Age	Song	Result
1	Youngr	32	"Ooh Lordy" (original song)	Eliminated
2	Ida Girls	Various	"Never Enough"	Eliminated
3	Carly Burns	27	"Hughie's Song" (original song)	Eliminated
4	Darby	35	"I (Who Have Nothing)"	Top 2 (Eliminated)
5	Ella Rothwell	28	"Darling" (original song)	Winner (Walked the Line)

=== Episode 3 (14 December) ===
Acts' performances on the third episode
Order	Act	Age	Song	Result
1	Daniel Arieleno	30	"Locked Out of Heaven"	Eliminated
2	Abz Winter	19	"Traitor"	Eliminated
3	Raynes	Various	"Come My Way" (original song)	Top 2 (Eliminated)
4	Lisa-Marie Holmes	35	"All by Myself"	Eliminated
5	Ella Rothwell	28	"Best of You"	Winner (Walked the Line)

=== Episode 4 (15 December) ===
Acts' performances on the fourth episode
Order	Act	Age	Song	Result
1	Deco	Various	"Rain" (original song)	Eliminated
2	ADMT	26	"Falling"	Eliminated
3	Anthony Stuart Lloyd	55	"One Moment in Time"	Eliminated
4	Nadiah Adu-Gyamfi	30	"Kissing You"	Winner (Advanced)
5	Ella Rothwell	28	"I Don't Need You Anymore" (original song)	Cashed Out (£40,000)

Judge Alesha Dixon came into close contact with someone who later tested positive for COVID-19, therefore she judged this episode from home virtually.

=== Episode 5 (16 December) ===
Acts' performances on the fifth episode
Order	Act	Age	Song	Result
1	Vincent Bugozi	Various	"One Day" (Original song)	Eliminated
2	Jamie Hannah	24	"The Winner Takes It All"	Eliminated
3	Chanel Haynes	44	"Respect"	Eliminated
4	Luke Burr	26	"Mine" (Original song)	Top 2 (Eliminated)
5	Nadiah Adu-Gyamfi	30	"Everybody's Free"	Winner (Walked the Line)

Judge Alesha Dixon came into close contact with someone who later tested positive for COVID-19, therefore she judged this episode from home virtually.

=== Episode 6 (17 December) ===
Acts' performances on the sixth and final episode
Order	Act	Age	Song	Result
1	Scarlet Thomas	19	"Something's Got a Hold on Me"	Top 2 (Eliminated)
2	Beatbox Collective	Various	a medley of Garage songs	Eliminated
3	Rodney Earl Clarke	43	"Mantra" (Original song)	Eliminated
4	Greg Charles	30	"Titanium"	Eliminated
5	Nadiah Adu-Gyamfi	30	"This Woman's Work"	Winner (Walked the Line)

Judge Gary Barlow performed his rendition of "Merry Christmas Everyone".

== Ratings ==
The first episode of Walk the Line was watched by approximately 3 million viewers, with The Guardian reporting that viewing figures for the following Monday night episode had slumped to 2.1 million, meaning that the show was beaten in the ratings by BBC Two's Only Connect, with 2.7 million viewers tuning into the quiz. Tuesday's episode fell to 1.8 million, with the figure increasing to 2.05 million viewers once catch-up data was included. With data included from catch-up services over a seven-day period, the other episodes achieved ratings of 2.23 million, 2.07 million and 2.2 million viewers. Over the six-episode series, the show averaged 2.1 million viewers, a 14% share of the available audience.
