= Live My Life =

Live My Life may refer to:

- "Live My Life" (song), a 2012 song by Far East Movement with vocals by Justin Bieber
- Live My Life (album), a 2009 album by Boris
- "Live My Life", a 1987 Boy George song from the Hiding Out soundtrack album
- "Live My Life", a 2001 song by N.O.R.E. featuring Ja Rule from the album God's Favorite
- "Live My Life (Leave Me Alone)", a song from the 2002 Cam'ron album Come Home with Me
- "Live My Life", a 2024 song by aespa from the album Armageddon

== See also ==
- I Live My Life, a 1935 American comedy-drama film
