= Boris Titulaer =

Bo Saris
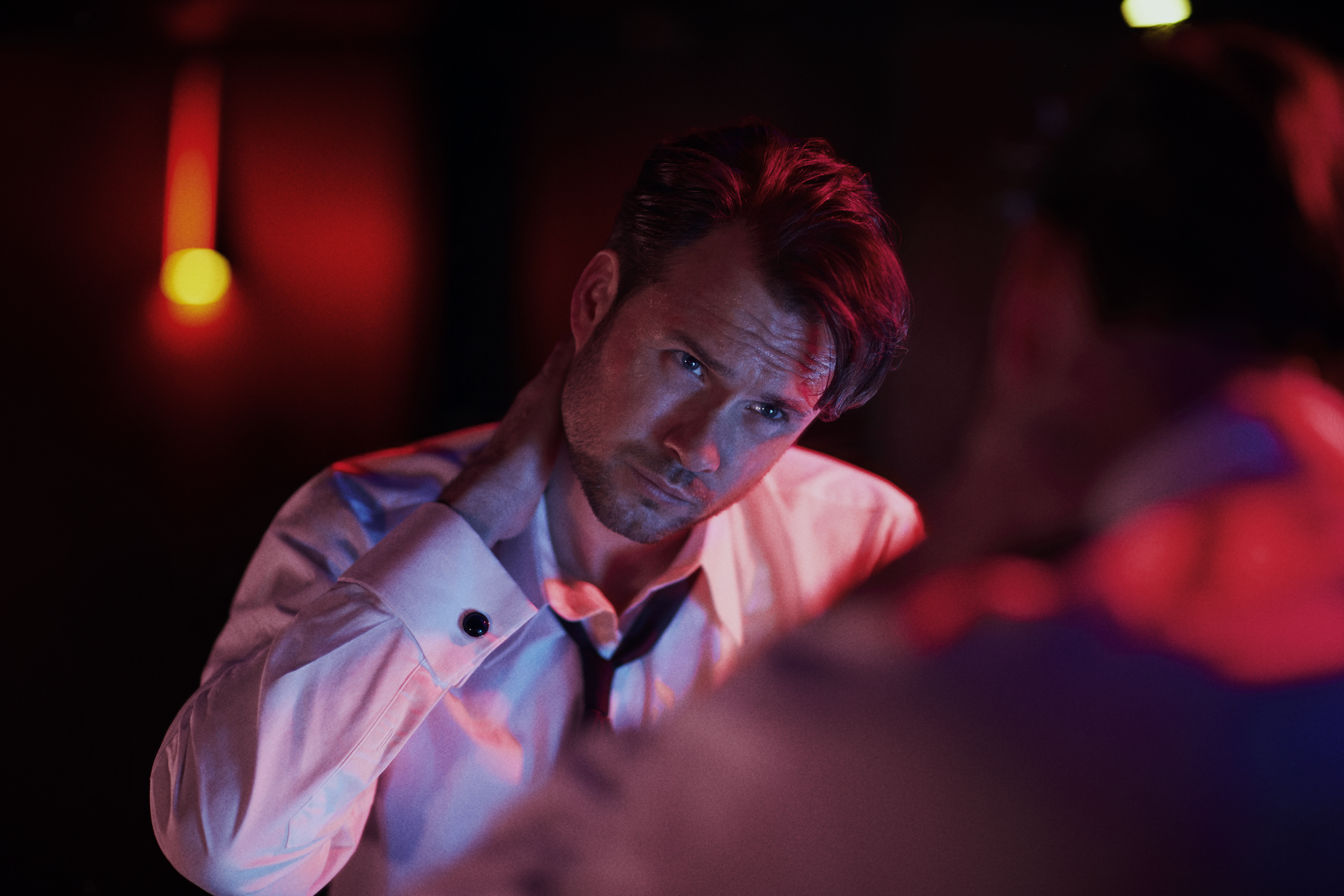
- Bo Saris

Background information
- Born: Boris Titulaer; 3 October 1980 (age 45); Venlo, Netherlands
- Origin: Venlo, Netherlands
- Genres: Soul, funk, R&B, pop
- Occupation: Singer
- Years active: 2001–present
- Label: Own

Boris “Bo” Saris (born 3 October 1980) is a Dutch contemporary soul singer-songwriter. In 2004 he won the Dutch talent show Idols.

== Biography ==
Saris was born in Venlo, Netherlands. He was the winner of the second edition of the Dutch talent show Idols. Following a series of successful albums in the Netherlands, he moved to London.

His first release under the moniker “Bo Saris“, he released the song She's On Fire, which peaked at number 5 in the Dutch Alternative Music charts in August 2012. The EP release included remixes by house music producer Maya Jane Coles and drum and bass producer Calibre. Both had a limited vinyl release.

He is also featured on the Chase & Status song "Breathing" from their 2013 album Brand New Machine.

Bo has released two EPs – The Addict and Little Bit More – Remixes. His album, GOLD, was released in May 2014. The single She's On Fire was featured in the movie Fifty Shades Of Grey.

In 2016 he released a new EP, called Best Of Me. Just before that he experienced difficulties in his life which had to do with his band and company Bo-Rush Productions. He incorporated his emotions and experiences in the lyrics of these songs for this EP. In 2017 he released an EP again, called B-Funk. With this EP Bo expresses his love for funk, and influences of Prince and Barry White are noticeable.

With the help of a crowdfunding Bo released his latest album in April 2018, called NEON. The single, also called NEON, is released shortly before. The second single All Night is released on 13 July 2018.

== Discography ==
=== As Boris ===
==== Albums ====
Year	Album details	Chart peak positions	Sales and Certifications
Year	Album details	NL	Sales and Certifications
2004	Rely on Me: First studio album; Released: 10 June 2004; Label: Sony BMG; Format: CD	1	40,000+ Gold (NL)
2006	Holy Pleasure: Second studio album; Released: 23 October 2006; Label: Sony BMG; Format: CD	12	
2009	Live My Life: Third studio album; Released: 30 January 2009; Label: Bo-Rush; Format: CD	4	
2009	Live My Life Live': Live album; Released: 13 November 2009; Label: Bo-Rush; Format: CD	—	
2014	GOLD: studio album; Released: 2014; Label: Decca; Format: CD	—	
2018	NEON: studio album; Released: 27 April 2018; Label: Own; Format: CD	—	

==== Singles ====
Year	Single	Chart peak positions	Album
Year	Single	NL	Album
2004	"When You Think of Me"	1	Rely on Me
2004	"M.S.G. (My Special Girlfriend)"	14	Rely on Me
2004	"Cordelia"	47	Rely on Me
2006	"Within My Hands"	30	Holy Pleasure
2006	"Holy Pleasure"	63	Holy Pleasure
2007	"Stupid Things"	—	Holy Pleasure
2008	"If You Wanna Roll With Me"	69	Live My Life
2009	"Everything About You"	—	Live My Life
2016	"Best Of Me"	–	
2018	"NEON"	–	

==== As featuring artist ====
- 2005: "No Sunrise" – Relax (feat. Bo-Rush) (#20, NL)

=== As Bo Saris ===
==== Singles ====
Year	Single	Album/EP
2012	"She's On Fire" "She's On Fire" (Maya Jane Coles Remix) "She's On Fire" (Calibre Remix) "She's On Fire" (Lazrjet Remix)	Gold

Year	Single	Album/EP
2012	"The Addict"	Gold

Year	Single	Album/EP
2012	"Little Bit More"	Gold

Year	Single	Album/EP
2018	"All Night"	NEON
