= Funny (disambiguation) =

Funny means something has humor.

Funny may also refer to:

- Comic strip, also known as funny pages
- "Funny", by Scars on Broadway from Scars on Broadway (album), 2008
- "Funny" (Chase & Status song), 2015
- "Funny" (Zedd and Jasmine Thompson song), 2020
- Funny (spider), a genus of spiders in the family Dictynidae
- "Funny", by Black Lips from Underneath the Rainbow, 2014
