= MGK (disambiguation) =

MGK (Colson Baker, born 1990) is an American musician also known as Machine Gun Kelly.

MGK may also refer to:

== Military ==
- MGK Bur, a Russian grenade launching system
- National Security Council (Turkey) (Turkish: Milli Güvenlik Kurulu)

== Transport ==
- Mega Aircompany, a Kazak airline (by ICAO code)
- MG K-type, a sports car (made 1932–1934)
- Mong Ton Airport, Myanmar (by IATA code)
- Mulankunnathukavu railway station, Kerala, India (by station code)

== Other uses ==
- M/G/k queue, in mathematical queueing theory
- Mawes language, spoken in Indonesia (ISO 639-3:mgk)

== See also ==
- Machine Gun Kelly (disambiguation)
- M. G. Kelly (born 1952, as Gary D. Sinclair) "Michael Gary "M.G." Kelly", U.S. on-air personality
