= Hypest Hype =

Single by Chase & Status featuring Tempa T

from the album No More Idols
- Released: 8 November 2010
- Recorded: 2010
- Genre: Big beat; breakbeat; grime
- Length: 3:30
- Label: Mercury; Vertigo
- Songwriters: Will Kennard; Saul Milton; Nicholas Dei; Jim Morrison; Robby Krieger; Ray Manzarek; John Densmore
- Producers: Chase & Status

Chase & Status singles chronology
| "Let You Go" (2010) | "Hypest Hype" (2010) | "Blind Faith" (2011) |

Tempa T single singles chronology
| "CD is Dead" (2010) | "Hypest Hype" (2010) | "Rari WorkOut" (2014) |

Music video
- "Hypest Hype" on YouTube

"Hypest Hype" is a song by electronic music duo Chase & Status. It was released on 8 November 2010 as a promotional single for their second studio album No More Idols, which was released on 28 January 2011. It also serves as the third overall single released from the album. The song features vocals from English grime MC Tempa T.

== Background and release ==
"Hypest Hype" received radio support after the release of "Let You Go" (reaching BBC Radio 1's A-List) implying it would be the third single. Instead, the song was released as a free download through their official website. However, it did chart at number 70 on the UK Singles Chart and number seven in the UK Dance Chart after the release of the album. On 21 November 2010, Q magazine dubbed the song as their "Track of the Day".

== Track listing ==
| No. | Title | Length |
|---|---|---|
| 1. | "Hypest Hype" (featuring Tempa T) | 3:30 |

== Personnel ==
- Saul Milton, Will Kennard – producer, mixing, writing, all instruments
- Nicholas "Tempa T" Dei – writing, lead vocals
- Andy Gangadeen – drums
- Takura Tendayi – backing vocals
- Jim Morrison, Robby Krieger, Ray Manzarek and John Densmore – writing

== Chart performance ==
| Chart (2011) | Peak position |
|---|---|
| UK Dance (Official Charts) | 7 |
| UK Singles (Official Charts) | 70 |

== Certifications ==
| Region | Certification | Certified units/sales |
|---|---|---|
| United Kingdom (BPI) | Silver | 200,000^{‡} |
^{‡} Sales+streaming figures based on certification alone.

== Release history ==
| Country | Release date | Format | Label |
|---|---|---|---|
| United Kingdom | 8 November 2010 | Digital download | Mercury; Vertigo |
