= Alive (Chase & Status song) =

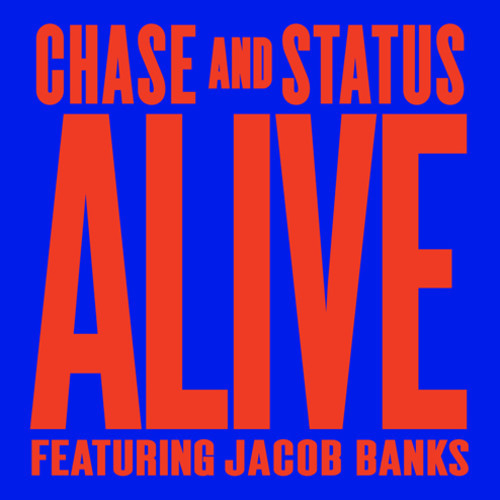

Single by Chase & Status featuring Jacob Banks

from the album Brand New Machine
- Released: 15 December 2013
- Genre: Drum and bass; soul
- Length: 3:25
- Label: Mercury; MTA; RAM
- Songwriters: Will Kennard; Saul Milton; Jacob Banks; Toby Young
- Producer: Chase & Status

Chase & Status singles chronology
| "Count on Me" (2013) | "Alive" (2013) | "Blk & Blu" (2014) |

Jacob Banks singles chronology
| "Doing OK" (2013) | "Alive" (2013) | "Move with You" (2014) |

Music video
- "Alive" on YouTube

"Alive" is a song by British record production duo Chase & Status, featuring vocals from British singer Jacob Banks. It was released independently on 15 December 2013 as the third single from their third studio album Brand New Machine. However, the song charted prior to independent release and entered the UK Dance Chart at number 40 on the week ending 23 November 2013, rising to number 16 on the week ending 30 November. The music video's release also caused a surge in popularity and the song rose to number 48 in the UK Singles Chart. It later peaked at number 21 on the week ending 25 January 2014. The song also featured in a FIFA 14 trailer for Xbox One and PlayStation 4.

== Music video ==
A music video to accompany the release of "Alive" was first released on YouTube on 4 December 2013 at a total length of seven minutes and thirteen seconds. The video was filmed on the Blackfeet Indian Reservation, Montana, USA. It was directed by Josh Cole.

== Track listing ==
Digital download
| No. | Title | Length |
|---|---|---|
| 1. | "Alive" (featuring Jacob Banks) | 3:24 |
| 2. | "Alive" (Todd Edwards Edit) | 3:37 |
| 3. | "Alive" (Mefjus Remix) | 5:40 |
| 4. | "Alive" (TCTS Remix) | 6:53 |

== Credits and personnel ==
- Vocals – Jacob Banks
- Lyrics – Jacob Banks, Toby Young
- Producer – Chase & Status (Will Kennard and Saul Milton)
- Label – MTA Records, Mercury Records, RAM Records

== Chart performance ==
=== Weekly charts ===
| Chart (2013) | Peak position |
|---|---|
| Belgium (Ultratip Bubbling Under Flanders) | 25 |
| Scotland Singles (Official Charts) | 26 |
| UK Dance (Official Charts) | 4 |
| UK Singles (Official Charts) | 21 |

== Certifications ==
| Region | Certification | Certified units/sales |
|---|---|---|
| United Kingdom (BPI) | Gold | 400,000^{‡} |
^{‡} Sales+streaming figures based on certification alone.

== Release history ==
| Country | Release date | Format | Label |
|---|---|---|---|
| United Kingdom | 15 December 2013 | Digital download; vinyl | Mercury; MTA; RAM |
