= Found What I've Been Looking For =

Single by Tom Grennan

from the EP Found What I've Been Looking For
- Released: 14 July 2017
- Length: 3:13
- Label: Insanity
- Songwriters: Tom Grennan; Jordan Riley
- Producer: Charlie Hugall

Tom Grennan singles chronology
"Praying" (2017)	"Found What I've Been Looking For" (2017)	"Royal Highness" (2017)

"Found What I've Been Looking For" is a song by English singer and songwriter Tom Grennan. It was released on 14 July 2017 as the lead single from his third EP, of the same name, released on 28 July 2017. It was also included on his debut studio album, Lighting Matches (2018). The song entered the UK top 100 in October 2018, peaking at number 82 and was certified platinum in September 2022.

== Track listing ==
"Found What I've Been Looking For"
No.	Title	Length
1.	"Found What I've Been Looking For"	3:12

"Found What I've Been Looking For" (remix)
No.	Title	Length
1.	"Found What I've Been Looking For" (Friction Back to 92 mix)	3:05

Found What I've Been Looking For EP
No.	Title	Length
1.	"Found What I've Been Looking For"	3:12
2.	"First Day of the Sun" (demo)	3:34
3.	"Silhouette" (demo)	3:53
4.	"Found What I've Been Looking For" (acoustic)	3:49
5.	"Alive" (acoustic)	4:03

== Charts ==
Weekly chart performance for "Found What I've Been Looking For"
Chart (2018–2019)	Peak position
Belgium (Ultratip Bubbling Under Wallonia)	24
UK Singles (OCC)	82

== Certifications ==
Certifications for "Found What I've Been Looking For"
Region	Certification	Certified units/sales
United Kingdom (BPI)	Platinum	600,000^{‡}
^{‡} Sales+streaming figures based on certification alone.
