= Bigger Man Sound =

Single by Chase & Status featuring Novelist

from the album London Bars
- Released: 27 November 2015
- Recorded: 2014
- Genre: Grime; hip-hop
- Length: 3:17
- Label: MTA; Mercury
- Songwriters: Will Kennard; Saul Milton
- Producer: Chase & Status

Chase & Status singles chronology
"Wha Gwarn?" (2015)	"Bigger Man Sound" (2015)	"Control" (2016)

Music video
- "Bigger Man Sound" on YouTube

"Bigger Man Sound" is a song by British record production duo Chase & Status, featuring vocals from Novelist. The song was released as a digital download on 27 November 2015 through MTA Records and Mercury Records. The song has peaked to number 161 on the UK Singles Chart. It is the fourth and final song in their London Bars project, a series of singles released in collaboration with grime MCs throughout November 2015.

== Music video ==
A music video to accompany the release of "Bigger Man Sound" was first released onto YouTube on 26 November 2015 at a total length of four minutes and thirty-three seconds.

== Track listing ==
Digital download
No.	Title	Length
1.	"Bigger Man Sound" (featuring Novelist)	3:17

== Chart performance ==
=== Weekly charts ===
Chart (2015)	Peak position
UK Singles (Official Charts Company)	161

== Release history ==
Region	Date	Format	Label
United Kingdom	27 November 2015	Digital download	MTA; Mercury
