= Blk & Blu =

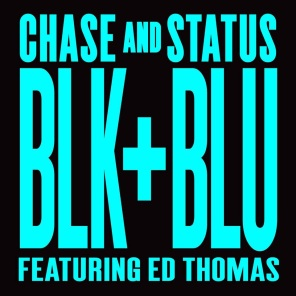

Single by Chase & Status featuring Ed Thomas

from the album Brand New Machine
- Released: 24 March 2014
- Genre: UK garage
- Length: 3:29 (radio edit); 5:20 (album version)
- Label: Mercury; MTA; RAM
- Songwriters: Will Kennard; Saul Milton; Ed Thomas
- Producer: Chase & Status

Chase & Status singles chronology
| "Alive" (2013) | "Blk & Blu" (2014) | "Funny" (2015) |

Ed Thomas singles chronology
| "Outlaws" (2014) | "Blk & Blu" (2014) |

Music video
- "Blk & Blu" on YouTube

"Blk & Blu" is a song by British record production duo Chase & Status, featuring vocals from British singer Ed Thomas. It was released independently on 24 March 2014 as the fourth single from their third studio album Brand New Machine. However, the song charted prior to independent release and entered the UK Singles Chart at number 181 upon the album release, rising to number 48 after release. The Preditah remix premiered on DJ Target's BBC Radio 1 show on 8 February 2014, and the Calibre remix premiered on UKF Drum & Bass on 9 February 2014.

== Music video ==
A music video to accompany the release of "Blk & Blu" was first released onto YouTube on 20 February 2014 at a total length of 4 minutes and 41 seconds. It was directed by Rollo Jackson.

== Track listing ==
Digital download
| No. | Title | Length |
|---|---|---|
| 1. | "Blk & Blu" (Zed Bias Remix) | 5:57 |
| 2. | "Blk & Blu" (Calibre Remix) | 6:05 |
| 3. | "Blk & Blu" (Preditah Remix) | 5:16 |

== Credits and personnel ==
- Vocals – Ed Thomas
- Lyrics – Ed Thomas
- Producer – Chase & Status (Will Kennard and Saul Milton)
- Label – MTA Records, Mercury Records, RAM Records

== Chart performance ==
=== Weekly charts ===
| Chart (2014) | Peak position |
|---|---|
| Belgium (Ultratip Bubbling Under Flanders) | 25 |
| UK Dance (Official Charts) | 14 |
| UK Singles (Official Charts) | 48 |

== Release history ==
| Country | Release date | Format | Label |
|---|---|---|---|
| United Kingdom | 24 March 2014 | Digital download; vinyl | Mercury; MTA; RAM |
