= Spoken Word (song) =

Single by Chase & Status featuring George the Poet
- Released: 17 June 2016
- Recorded: 2014
- Length: 3:23
- Label: MTA; Mercury
- Songwriters: Nigel Swanston; Tim Cox; Saul Milton; William Kennard; Nathaniel Ledwidge; George Mpanga
- Producer: Chase & Status

Chase & Status singles chronology
"NRG" (2016)	"Spoken Word" (2016)	"All Goes Wrong" (2016)

Music video
- "Spoken Word" on YouTube

"Spoken Word" is a song by British record production duo Chase & Status, featuring vocals from British rapper George the Poet. The song was released as a digital download on 17 June 2016 through MTA Records and Mercury Records. The song peaked at number 78 on the UK Singles Chart. The song was written by Nigel Swanston, Tim Cox, Saul Milton, William Kennard, Nathaniel Ledwidge, George Mpanga and produced by Chase & Status.

== Music video ==
A music video to accompany the release of "Spoken Word" was first released onto YouTube on 12 July 2016 at a total length of three minutes and twenty-four seconds.

== Track listing ==
Digital download
No.	Title	Length
1.	"Spoken Word" (featuring George the Poet)	3:23

== Chart performance ==
=== Weekly charts ===
Chart (2016)	Peak position
UK Singles (Official Charts)	78

== Release history ==
Region	Date	Format	Label
United Kingdom	27 November 2015	Digital download	MTA; Mercury
