= International (Chase & Status song) =

Promotional single by Chase & Status

from the album Brand New Machine
- Released: 13 September 2014
- Genre: Dancehall; trap
- Length: 4:12
- Label: Mercury; MTA; Vertigo; RAM
- Songwriters: Will Kennard; Saul Milton; Philip Thomas; Chris Lane; John MacGillivray
- Producer: Chase & Status

Music video
- "International" on YouTube

"International" is a song by English record production duo Chase & Status. It samples elements of "The Stopper" by Cutty Ranks, who is credited as a featured artist on the video but not the song itself. The song was released as part of the duo's third studio album, Brand New Machine, on 7 October 2013. Due to the popularity of the Skrillex remix (which features on the deluxe edition of the album), the song entered the UK singles chart at number 116 upon the album release. It was later released in the form of a video and Dimension remix on 6 August 2014. The single, backed with the Dimension remix, was released on vinyl through RAM Records on 13 September 2014.

== Track listing ==
12" vinyl
No.	Title	Length
1.	"International"	4:12
2.	"International" (Dimension remix)	4:32

== Charts ==
Chart (2013)	Peak position
UK Dance (Official Charts)	22
UK Singles (Official Charts Company)	116
