= Big Man (Chase & Status song) =

Single by Chase & Status featuring Liam Bailey
- Released: 16 October 2012
- Recorded: 2012
- Genre: Drum and bass; electronic rock
- Length: 3:36
- Label: Mercury
- Songwriters: Saul Milton; Will Kennard; Liam Bailey; Holly Simpson
- Producers: Chase & Status

Chase & Status singles chronology
"Flashing Lights" (2011)	"Big Man" (2012)	"Lost & Not Found" (2013)

Liam Bailey singles chronology
"It's Not the Same" (2011)	"Big Man" (2012)	"When Will They Learn?" (2013)

Music video
- "Big Man" on YouTube

"Big Man" is a song by electronic duo Chase & Status featuring vocals from British singer Liam Bailey. The track was released in the United Kingdom as a promotional download on 16 October 2012, both for free and on retailers. The song managed to enter the UK Singles Chart at number 68 and the UK Dance Chart at number thirteen. Although an independent release, the song features as the American bonus track of their 2013 album Brand New Machine.

== Track listing ==
Digital download
No.	Title	Length
1.	"Big Man" (featuring Liam Bailey)	3:36

== Chart performance ==
Chart (2014)	Peak position
UK Dance (Official Charts)	13
UK Singles (Official Charts)	68

== Release history ==
Region	Date	Format
United Kingdom	15 October 2012	Radio airplay
United Kingdom	16 October 2012	Digital download
