= Something in the Water (Tom Grennan song) =

Single by Tom Grennan

from the album Something In the Water
- Released: 22 August 2016
- Length: 3:27
- Label: Insanity
- Songwriter: Tom Grennan
- Producer: Charlie Hugall

Tom Grennan singles chronology
"Something in the Water" (2016)	"All Goes Wrong" (2016)

"Something in the Water" is a song by English singer and songwriter Tom Grennan. "Something in the Water" was uploaded onto YouTube in July 2016, before being released onto streaming services on 22 August 2016 as his debut single and lead single from his debut EP, of the same name, released on 28 October 2016. It was also included on his debut studio album, Lighting Matches (2018). The song was certified silver in July 2023.

In 2023, Grennan was sued by someone who claimed Grennan plagiarised the lyrics.

== Track listing ==
"Something In the Water"
No.	Title	Length
1.	"Something In the Water"	3:27

Something In the Water EP
No.	Title	Length
1.	"Something In the Water"	3:27
2.	"Old Songs"	4:04
3.	"Sweet Hallelujah"	3:45
4.	"All Goes Wrong" (with Chase & Status) (acoustic)	3:40

== Certifications ==
Certifications for "Something In the Water"
Region	Certification	Certified units/sales
United Kingdom (BPI)	Silver	200,000^{‡}
^{‡} Sales+streaming figures based on certification alone.
