= Blind Faith (Chase & Status song) =

Single by Chase & Status featuring Liam Bailey and Yolanda Quartey

from the album No More Idols
- Released: 21 January 2011
- Recorded: 2010
- Genre: Dubstep; drum and bass
- Length: 3:53
- Label: Mercury; RAM
- Songwriters: Saul Milton; William Kennard; Liam Bailey
- Producer: Chase & Status

Chase & Status singles chronology
"Hypest Hype" (2010)	"Blind Faith" (2011)	"Time" (2011)

Liam Bailey singles chronology
"Blind Faith" (2011)	"It's Not the Same" (2011)

Music video
- "Blind Faith" on YouTube

"Blind Faith" is a song by British drum and bass duo Chase & Status. It was released as the second official single, and the third overall, from their second studio album, No More Idols (2011). The single features vocals from Liam Bailey, and was released on 21 January 2011. The single peaked at number five on the UK Singles Chart, tying with "Count On Me" as their highest-charting single to date. The chorus of the song also features vocals performed by Yolanda Quartey. and samples from 'Let The Music Take Control ' by Joey Negro and the Sunburst Band. "Blind Faith" is featured on the soundtrack of the racing video games Dirt 3 and Forza Horizon. The song was used by BBC Sport during its coverage of the 2013 World Athletics Championships. Blind Faith was rated the 48th best dance music track of all time in a 2013 poll conducted by Mixmag.

== Critical reception ==
Robert Copsey of Digital Spy gave the song a perfect 5/5 review, stating: "Long before Britney knocked us for six with that head-spinning dubstep breakdown on her comeback hit, Chase & Status had a few startling syncopated moments of their own, you know. In fact, we could happily spend the weekend drawing up a neat 'Six Degrees of Dubstep' table to show how, two years since the London duo's debut, the genre's gone from scuzzy underground raves to the sound of choice for pop's A-listers. Of course, there are no double entendres or Spears-style vocal trickery here – just a straight-up grime/dance crossover cut that's both thumpingly energetic and beautifully uplifiting. Guest crooner Liam Bailey's soulful vocals are both soaring and cinematic, while the Yolanda Quartey-helmed chorus sounds like a million '90s club classics rolled into one. Seventeen spins on, it's got us as excited as a Grandad-on-viagra for tonight's dancefloor debauchery.".

== Music video ==
The music video for "Blind Faith" appeared on YouTube on 9 December 2010. The video is set during the illegal warehouse rave era of the early 1990s, and features a group of people partying in empty warehouses where Chase & Status are playing. Liam Bailey is shown in several scenes, and subtitles to the song are featured at the bottom of the screen. Slipmatt also makes a cameo appearance.

== Track listing ==
- 12" vinyl
1. "Blind Faith" – 3:53
2. "Blind Faith" (Loadstar Remix) – 4:12
- Promotional CD single No. 1
1. "Blind Faith" (Edit) – 3:41
2. "Blind Faith" (Edit) (Instrumental) – 3:41
- Promotional CD single No. 2
1. "Blind Faith" – 3:53
2. "Blind Faith" (MJ Cole Remix) – 6:10
3. "Blind Faith" (Trolly Snatcha Mix) – 5:04
- Digital download EP
1. "Blind Faith" – 3:53
2. "Blind Faith" (Loadstar Remix) – 4:12
3. "Blind Faith" (MJ Cole Remix) – 6:10
4. "Blind Faith" (Trolly Snatcha Mix) – 5:04
5. "Blind Faith" (Director's Cut Music Video) – 9:21

== Chart performance ==
=== Weekly charts ===
Chart (2011)	Peak position
Belgium (Ultratip Bubbling Under Flanders)	9
Belgium (Ultratip Bubbling Under Wallonia)	19
Denmark (Tracklisten)	24
Scottish Singles Sales (Official Charts)	5
UK Singles (Official Charts)	5
UK Dance (Official Charts)	1

=== Year-end charts ===
Chart (2011)	position
UK Singles (Official Charts Company)	75

== Certifications ==
Certifications for "Blind Faith"
Region	Certification	Certified units/sales
New Zealand (RMNZ)	Platinum	30,000^{‡}
United Kingdom (BPI)	2× Platinum	1,200,000^{‡}
^{‡} Sales+streaming figures based on certification alone.

== Release history ==
Region	Date	Format	Label
Australia	21 January 2011	12"; CD; digital download	Mercury; RAM
Ireland	21 January 2011	12"; CD; digital download	Mercury; RAM
New Zealand	21 January 2011	12"; CD; digital download	Mercury; RAM
United Kingdom	21 January 2011	12"; CD; digital download	Mercury; RAM

== See also ==
- List of UK Dance Singles Chart number ones of 2011
