= Wha Gwarn? =

Single by Chase & Status featuring Bonkaz

from the album London Bars
- Released: 20 November 2015
- Recorded: 2014
- Genre: Grime; hip-hop
- Length: 3:34
- Label: MTA; Mercury
- Songwriters: Will Kennard; Saul Milton
- Producer: Chase & Status

Chase & Status singles chronology
"More Ratatatin" (2015)	"Wha Gwarn?" (2015)	"Bigger Man Sound" (2015)

Music video
- "Wha Gwarn?" on YouTube

"Wha Gwarn?" is a song by British record production duo Chase & Status, featuring vocals from Bonkaz. The song was released as a digital download on 20 November 2015 through MTA Records and Mercury Records. The song peaked at number 146 on the UK Singles Chart. It is the third song in their London Bars project, a series of singles released in collaboration with grime MCs throughout November 2015.

== Music video ==
A music video to accompany the release of "Wha Gwarn?" was first released onto YouTube on 19 November 2015 at a total length of four minutes and fifty seconds.

== Track listing ==
Digital download
No.	Title	Length
1.	"Wha Gwarn?" (featuring Bonkaz)	3:34

== Charts ==
Chart (2015)	Peak position
UK Singles (Official Charts Company)	146

== Release history ==
Region	Date	Format	Label
United Kingdom	20 November 2015	Digital download	MTA; Mercury
