= Generic Everything =

Studio album by Chase & Status
- Released: 9 October 2026
- Length: 29:54
- Labels: 2Ruff; Warner UK
- Producers: Chase & Status

Chase & Status chronology
What Came Before (2022)	Generic Everything (2026)

Singles from Generic Everything
- 1. "Disgruntled" Released: 24 July 2026; 2. "Gone Too Far" Released: 26 August 2026; 3. "Essa Ta Quente" Released: 8 September 2026

Generic Everything is the seventh studio album by the English drum and bass production duo Chase & Status, which was released on 9 October 2026 under exclusive license to Warner Music Group. The album includes the singles "Disgruntled" (featuring J Hus and Irah), "Gone Too Far" (featuring Tom Grennan), and "Essa Ta Quente" (featuring Skrillex).

== Background ==
The duo said the album is about "resisting the pressure to become the same as everyone else" and "This album is about pushing back. Every song, visual and show is an attempt to break out of the cube and create something that feels genuinely different. The idea isn’t simply that creativity is trapped. It’s that it’s being forced to conform".

== Track listing ==
Generic Everything track listing
No.	Title	Writer(s)	Length
1.	"Disgruntled" (featuring J Hus and Irah)	Will Kennard; Saul Milton; Ezra Bryant; Anthony Bunbury; Momodou Jallow; Alex Naim	3:12
2.	"Tension" (featuring Saam Sultan)	Kennard; Milton; Saam Sultan	2:27
3.	"Carnage" (featuring Little Simz)	Kennard; Milton; Abisola Ajikawo; Brendan Grieve; Naim	3:08
4.	"Essa Ta Quente" (with Skrillex)	Kennard; Milton; Skrillex	2:46
5.	"Juggin" (featuring Blanco and Finesse Kid)	Kennard; Milton; Joshua Eduardo; Glodi Mampuli; Freddi Poole; Guy Weir	2:47
6.	"Levels" (featuring D Double E)	Kennard; Milton; Darren Dixon	2:33
7.	"Influence" (featuring Ledbyher)	Kennard; Milton; Rachel Diack	3:21
8.	"Gone Too Far" (featuring Debbie)	Kennard; Milton; Ben Drew	4:04
9.	"Timber" (featuring Giggs)	Kennard; Milton; Nathaniel Thompson	2:46
10.	"Shutdown" (featuring Irah and Col3trane)	Kennard; Milton; Cole Basta; Bryant	2:50
Total length:			29:54

== Personnel ==
Credits are adapted from Tidal.

=== Chase & Status ===
- Will Kennard – bass, drums, keyboards, programming, strings, synthesizer, production, mixing (all tracks); engineering (tracks 1, 8), vocal engineering (3, 6, 7, 10)
- Saul Milton – bass, drums, keyboards, programming, strings, synthesizer, production, mixing (all tracks); engineering (1, 8), vocal engineering (6, 7, 10)

=== Additional contributors ===
- Stuart Hawkes – mastering
- Alex Naim – additional guitar (1), additional production (3)
- Irah – vocals (1, 10)
- J Hus – vocals (1)
- Clement Sigoigne – intro vocals (1)
- Jonathan Howard – programming (1)
- Joseph Murphy – programming (1)
- Rxwntree – vocal engineering (1)
- Saam Sultan – vocals (2)
- Little Simz – vocals (3)
- Bren – additional production (3)
- Sonny Moore – bass, drums, keyboards, programming, strings, synthesizer, mixing (4)
- Blanco – vocals (5)
- Finesse Kid – vocals (5)
- Gw – vocal engineering (5)
- X10 – vocal engineering (5)
- D Double E – vocals (6)
- Ledbyher – vocals (7)
- Ben Drew – guitar (8)
- Debbie – vocals (8)
- Shaun Barrett – engineering (8)
- Giggs – vocals (9)
- Ben Oakland – vocal engineering (9)
- Col3trane – vocals (10)
- Takura – additional vocals (10)

== Charts ==
Chart performance
Chart (2026)	Peak position
Australian Albums (ARIA)	9
Belgian Albums (Ultratop Flanders)	17
Belgian Albums (Ultratop Wallonia)	60
Hungarian Physical Albums (MAHASZ)	34
New Zealand Albums (RMNZ)	5
Scottish Albums (Official Charts)	4
UK Albums (Official Charts)	2
UK Dance Albums (Official Charts)	1
