= Lost & Not Found =

Single by Chase & Status featuring Louis M^ttrs

from the album Brand New Machine
- B-side: "Lost & Not Found" (Kove Remix)
- Released: 26 June 2013
- Recorded: 2012
- Genre: Breakbeat; drum and bass
- Length: 4:15
- Label: Mercury; MTA; RAM
- Songwriters: Will Kennard; Saul Milton; Louis Collard-Watson
- Producer: Chase & Status

Chase & Status singles chronology
"Big Man" (2012)	"Lost & Not Found" (2013)	"Count on Me" (2013)

Louis M^ttrs singles chronology
"Lost & Not Found" (2013)	"Beachy Head" (2013)

Music video
- "Lost & Not Found" on YouTube

"Lost & Not Found" is a song by British record production duo Chase & Status, featuring vocals from British singer Louis M^ttrs. It was released on 26 June 2013 as the lead single from their third studio album Brand New Machine. The song was originally due to be released on 30 June, but was included on Clubland 23 which was released on 24 June and the release date was brought forward. Due to this incident, the song title was changed to include the "not" from the second half of the chorus.

== Music video ==
A music video to accompany the release of "Lost & Not Found" was first released onto YouTube on 4 June 2013 at a total length of five minutes and eight seconds. As of April 2016, it has received over seven million views.

== Critical reception ==
Lewis Corner of Digital Spy gave the song a positive review stating:

"It doesn’t take a genius to figure out just how significant Chase & Status’s contribution to electronic dance music has been. The duo—consisting of Saul Milton and Will Kennard—were instrumental in the rise of the dubstep-meets-pop movement following their contributions to Rihanna’s 2009 album Rated R, while their last record boasted an all-star lineup and garnered both critical and commercial success. It’s a tack they look to continue with their new single, “Lost & Not Found,” albeit with lighter breakbeats and bigger strings.

“We’re gonna take flight / Paper planes getting rolled up / Our dreams hit the fan / The pain of getting older,” vocalist Louis M^ttrs laments, before floating into a chorus more breezy than Brighton Pier. It might not be a total reinvention from the duo in an industry bursting with fresh EDM talent, but it’s more than enough to keep them at the forefront of their game.".

== Track listing ==
Digital download
No.	Title	Length
1.	"Lost & Not Found"	4:15
2.	"Lost & Not Found" (Dream Mclean Remix)	3:36
3.	"Lost & Not Found" (Kove Remix)	4:13
4.	"Lost & Not Found" (Josh Butler Remix)	6:12

12" vinyl
No.	Title	Length
1.	"Lost & Not Found"	4:15
2.	"Lost & Not Found" (Kove Remix)	4:13

== Credits and personnel ==
- Vocals – Louis M^ttrs
- Lyrics – Louis Collard-Watson (Louis M^ttrs)
- Producer – Chase & Status (Will Kennard and Saul Milton)
- Label – MTA Records, Mercury Records, RAM Records

== Charts ==
=== Weekly charts ===
Chart (2013)	Peak position
Belgium (Ultratip Bubbling Under Flanders)	22
Belgium Dance (Ultratop Flanders)	30
Belgium Dance (Ultratop Wallonia)	48
Scotland Singles (Official Charts)	11
UK Singles (Official Charts)	9
UK Dance (Official Charts)	2

=== Year-end charts ===
Chart (2013)	Position
UK Singles (OCC)	109

== Certifications ==
Region	Certification	Certified units/sales
United Kingdom (BPI)	Gold	400,000^{‡}
^{‡} Sales+streaming figures based on certification alone.

== Release history ==
Country	Release date	Format	Label
United Kingdom	26 June 2013	Digital download	Mercury; MTA
United Kingdom	15 July 2013	12" vinyl	RAM
