= Let You Go =

Single by Chase & Status featuring Mali

from the album No More Idols
- Released: 15 August 2010
- Recorded: 2010
- Genre: Dubstep; drum and bass
- Length: 3:55
- Label: Vertigo; RAM
- Songwriters: William Kennard; Saul Milton; Ben Drew
- Producer: Chase & Status

Chase & Status singles chronology
"End Credits" (2009)	"Let You Go" (2010)	"Hypest Hype" (2010)

Mali singles chronology
"Let You Go" (2010)

Music video
- "Let You Go" on YouTube

"Let You Go" is the second overall, and official lead single, taken from drum and bass duo Chase & Status' second studio album, No More Idols. The song features vocals from singer Mali, and was released as a digital download on 15 August 2010. The single debuted on the UK Singles Chart at number 11, marking the duo's second most successful single to date. In July 2010, "Let You Go" was added to BBC Radio 1's A playlist.

== Music video ==
The music video for "Let You Go" was directed by thirtytwo, made up of Will Lovelace and Dylan Southern, and was released on 29 July 2010. The video features a TV talk show host, a parody of Jeremy Kyle, called Patrick Chase, played by British stage actor Glenn Carter. He is praised by the audience, particularly for his scathing insults about the guests on his show and his catchphrase "If you can't be good, be honest". The video then switches to Patrick Chase on a night out and we see his wild behaviour: he has sex with a woman who is not his wife possibly a sex worker, While her young children are in the next room; gets drunk and buys substances; snorts several lines of cocaine; picks up a prostitute and has sex with her while watching his TV show. We then see a fast montage of his double life: the adoration of his fans and his secret other persona, including a minor car crash while driving under the influence. We also see him being a talk show host to cover up who he really is. The video ends with Patrick sitting in a make up chair, looking at a photo of his wife and children, before beginning a new show with his cheering fans surrounding him. Plan B makes a cameo appearance in the video as the cocaine dealer.

== Track listing ==
- 12" vinyl
1. "Let You Go" (Brookes Brothers Remix) – 4:47
2. "Let You Go" (Chase & Status V.I.P. Mix) – 3:32
- Promotional CD single No. 1
1. "Let You Go" – 3:55
2. "Let You Go" (Instrumental) – 3:55
- Promotional CD single No. 2
1. "Let You Go" (Nero Remix) – 5:15
2. "Let You Go" (Brookes Brothers Remix) – 4:47
3. "Let You Go" (Chase & Status V.I.P. Mix) – 3:32
4. "Let You Go" (Feed Me Remix) – 5:01
- Promotional CD single No. 3
1. "Let You Go" – 3:55
2. "Let You Go" (Chase & Status V.I.P. Mix) – 3:32
- Promotional CD single No. 4
1. "Let You Go" – 3:55
2. "Delta Heavy" (featuring Dizzee Rascal) – 3:05
3. "End Credits" (featuring Plan B) – 3:19
- Digital download EP
1. "Let You Go" – 3:55
2. "Let You Go" (Nero Remix) – 5:15
3. "Let You Go" (Brookes Brothers Remix) – 4:47
4. "Let You Go" (Feed Me Remix) – 5:01
5. "Let You Go" (Chase & Status V.I.P. Mix) – 3:32

== Chart performance ==
"Let You Go" debuted on the UK Singles Chart on 22 August 2010 at number 11, also debuting on the UK Dance Chart at number three; marking the duo's second most successful single to date, following "End Credits", which featured Plan B, peaked at number nine in October 2009. In its second week on the chart, the single fell three places to number 14. On 5 September 2010, the single fell a further eight places to number 22, and then a further nine to number 31 the following week, marking its fourth week in the top 40.

=== Weekly charts ===
Chart (2010)	Peak position
Scotland Singles (Official Charts)	13
UK Singles (Official Charts)	11
UK Dance (Official Charts)	3

=== Year-end charts ===
Chart (2010)	Position
UK Singles (OCC)	187

== Certifications ==
Region	Certification	Certified units/sales
United Kingdom (BPI)	Gold	400,000^{‡}
^{‡} Sales+streaming figures based on certification alone.

== Release history ==
Region	Date	Format	Label
United Kingdom	15 August 2010	12"; CD; digital download	Mercury
