= All Goes Wrong =

Single by Chase & Status featuring Tom Grennan

from the album Tribe
- Released: 22 September 2016
- Recorded: 2015
- Length: 3:25
- Label: MTA; Mercury
- Songwriters: Saul Milton; William Kennard; Kieron McIntosh; Nathaniel Ledwidge; Tom Grennan; Dean McIntosh
- Producer: Chase & Status

Chase & Status singles chronology
"Spoken Word" (2016)	"All Goes Wrong" (2016)	"This Moment" (2017)

Tom Grennan singles chronology
"Something In the Water" (2016)	"All Goes Wrong" (2016)	"Praying" (2017)

Music video
- "All Goes Wrong" on YouTube

"All Goes Wrong" is a song by British record production duo Chase & Status, featuring vocals from singer and songwriter Tom Grennan. The song was released as a digital download on 22 September 2016 through MTA Records and Mercury Records. The song peaked at number 65 on the UK Singles Chart. The song was written by Saul Milton, William Kennard, Kieron McIntosh, Nathaniel Ledwidge, Tom Grennan, Dean McIntosh and produced by Chase & Status.

== Music video ==
A music video to accompany the release of "All Goes Wrong" was first released onto YouTube on 12 July 2016 at a total length of three minutes and thirty-two seconds.

== Use in other media ==
The song was used by Sky Sports F1 in their 2016 Formula One season highlights video. On 12 July 2017, he performed the song at the Formula One live event in London. The song was used in the US TV show Power. The song is also used in the opening title sequence for the Sky One police action drama Bulletproof. The song was also used in the ending sequence of the PSVR title "Blood & Truth".

== Track listing ==
Digital download
No.	Title	Length
1.	"All Goes Wrong" (featuring Tom Grennan)	3:25

Digital download
No.	Title	Length
1.	"All Goes Wrong" (featuring Tom Grennan) (Premiership VIP remix)	3:34

Digital download
No.	Title	Length
1.	"All Goes Wrong" (featuring Tom Grennan) (Premiership VIP remix)	3:34

Digital download
No.	Title	Length
1.	"All Goes Wrong" (featuring Tom Grennan) (Acoustic)	3:40

Digital download
No.	Title	Length
1.	"All Goes Wrong" (featuring Tom Grennan) (Dawn Wall remix)	4:20

Digital download
No.	Title	Length
1.	"All Goes Wrong" (featuring Tom Grennan) (Tough Love remix)	3:22

Digital download
No.	Title	Length
1.	"All Goes Wrong" (featuring Tom Grennan) (Salvatore Ganacci remix)	2:43

== Charts ==
Chart (2016–17)	Peak position
Belgium (Ultratip Bubbling Under Flanders)	3
Hungary (Single Top 40)	38
Scotland Singles (Official Charts)	40
UK Singles (Official Charts)	65

== Certifications ==
Certifications for "All Goes Wrong"
Region	Certification	Certified units/sales
New Zealand (RMNZ)	Gold	15,000^{‡}
^{‡} Sales+streaming figures based on certification alone.

== Release history ==
Region	Date	Format	Label
United Kingdom	22 September 2016	Digital download	MTA; Mercury
