= No More Idols =

Studio album by Chase & Status
- Released: 28 January 2011
- Recorded: 2009–10
- Genres: Drum and bass; electronic rock; dubstep; hip-hop
- Length: 59:26
- Labels: Vertigo; Mercury; RAM
- Producer: Chase & Status

Chase & Status chronology
More than Alot (2008)	No More Idols (2011)	Brand New Machine (2013)

Singles from No More Idols
- 1. "End Credits" Released: 29 October 2009; 2. "Let You Go" Released: 15 August 2010; 3. "Hypest Hype" Released: 8 November 2010; 4. "Blind Faith" Released: 21 January 2011; 5. "Time" Released: 29 April 2011; 6. "Hitz" Released: 15 July 2011; 7. "Flashing Lights" Released: 21 November 2011

No More Idols is the second studio album by English drum and bass production duo Chase & Status, released on 28 January 2011. No More Idols marks the first major full-length release by Chase & Status since their debut album More than Alot three years prior; a period in which the group signed a major management deal with Jay-Z's Roc Nation and focused more on producing for other artists including Rihanna's 2009 album Rated R.

Produced entirely by the group, No More Idols features vocal contributions from primarily UK talent including Tinie Tempah, Dizzee Rascal, Clare Maguire, Tempa T, White Lies and long-time collaborator Plan B amongst others. Upon its release, the album met with generally positive reviews, receiving comparisons to similar acts such as Pendulum and The Prodigy. The genre-bending production style employed on the album was noted as a stand-out feature. The album was preceded by three singles which attained UK chart success. No More Idols was announced as the seventeenth biggest-selling album of 2011 in the UK, with sales exceeding 461,000 copies.

The song "No Problem" was included in the soundtrack of the game FIFA 12 and "Blind Faith" in the video games Dirt 3 and Forza Horizon.

== Singles ==
- "End Credits" was released on 29 October 2009 as the first single from the album, and it features guest vocals from UK rapper and singer Plan B. The single managed to peak at number nine on the UK Singles Chart.
- "Let You Go" was the second single to be released from the album on 15 August 2010, the single featured vocals from singer Mali. The single peaked at number 11 on the UK Singles Chart.
- "Hypest Hype" featuring Tempa T received radio support after the release of "Let You Go" (reaching BBC Radio 1's A-List) implying it would be the third single, but it was never released. However, it did chart at number 70 on the UK Singles Chart after the release of the album.
- "Blind Faith" was released on 21 January 2011 as the fourth single from their album. The song features guest vocals from British musician Liam Bailey. The single peaked at number five on the UK Singles Chart.
- "Time" was released on 29 April 2011 as the fifth single from the album. The single features guest vocals from singer Delilah and has thus far reached number six on the UK Dance Chart and number 21 on the UK Singles Chart.
- "Hitz" was released on 15 July 2011 as the sixth single from the album. The single features guest vocals from British rapper Tinie Tempah and has so far reached number 11 on the UK Dance Chart and number 39 on the UK Singles Chart. The official video for the single was released on 10 June 2011 on Chase & Status Vevo page.
- "Flashing Lights" was released as the seventh single from the album on 21 November 2011. V.I.P. mixes of "Brixton Briefcase" were released as a B-side tracks.

== Critical reception ==
Professional ratings
Aggregate scores
Source	Rating
Metacritic	67/100
Review scores
Source	Rating
AllMusic	4/5 stars
Clash	6/10
The Daily Telegraph	3/5 stars
Dotmusic	8/10
Financial Times	3/5 stars
Gigwise	4/5 stars
The Guardian	3/5 stars
The Independent	4/5 stars
NME	1/10
Q	4/5 stars

The album received a generally positive response on its release. Mike Haydock of the BBC gave the album a positive review stating: "No More Idols is a whirlwind of an album, one that smashes together a hundred genres, from trance to grime, hip hop to indie rock, always keeping the listener on their toes. Songs shift between moods in a heartbeat, pulling the carpet out from under you. And the list of collaborations is both smart and prescient: they've teamed up with old pal Plan B, Tinie Tempah, Dizzee Rascal, White Lies, Clare Maguire and Cee-Lo Green – artists that can pull in a vast audience in their own right." Andy Gill of The Independent gave it a four out of five rating, as did Jon Bye of Gigwise.com, who described it as "an early contender for one of the albums of the year".

AllMusic's Jon O'Brien also gave it four stars, describing it as "a consistently impressive and intriguing listen that has the potential to be the drum'n'bass genre's defining studio album". The Observer's Kitty Empire described it as sounding "more like a compilation". Metro gave it three out of five, commenting on "increasingly polished songwriting", and the Daily Telegraph also gave it three out of five, describing it as "an effectively youthful update on the Prodigy's formula". The album received similarly lukewarm reviews from Clash (Matt Oliver stating "It's alright and will shift units"), The Guardian, and the Financial Times. The album received a one out of ten review in NME, with reviewer Ash Dosanjh calling it "soulless nonsense".

== Track listing ==
All tracks are written by Will Kennard and Saul Milton.

No.	Title	Writer(s)	Length
1.	"No Problem"	Takura Tendayi	4:10
2.	"Fire in Your Eyes" (featuring Maverick Sabre)	Michael Stafford	4:15
3.	"Let You Go" (featuring Mali)	Ben Drew	3:54
4.	"Blind Faith" (featuring Liam Bailey)	Liam Bailey; Dan Hartman; David Lee	3:53
5.	"Fool Yourself" (featuring Plan B and Rage)	Drew; Patrick Williams	4:34
6.	"Hypest Hype" (featuring Tempa T)	Nicholas Dei; Jim Morrison; Robby Krieger; Ray Manzarek; John Densmore	3:29
7.	"Hitz" (featuring Tinie Tempah)	Patrick Okogwu	3:08
8.	"Heavy" (vs. Dizzee Rascal)	Dylan Mills	3:33
9.	"Brixton Briefcase" (featuring CeeLo Green)	CeeLo Green; Rick Nowels	3:58
10.	"Hocus Pocus"		3:59
11.	"Flashing Lights" (with Sub Focus featuring Takura)	Nick Douwma; Tendayi	4:11
12.	"Embrace" (featuring White Lies)	Harry McVeigh; Charles Cave	4:58
13.	"Time" (featuring Delilah)	Drew; Paloma Ayana	4:20
14.	"Midnight Caller" (featuring Clare Maguire)	Claire Maguire	3:45
15.	"End Credits" (featuring Plan B)	Drew	3:20
Total length:			59:26

iTunes Store bonus material
No.	Title	Length
16.	"No More Idols – Live EPK" (Video)	3:46
Total length:		63:12

Physical deluxe edition bonus DVD
No.	Title	Length
1.	"Fire in Your Eyes" (live at The HMV Forum)	4:25
2.	"Let You Go" (live at the HMV Forum)	4:01
3.	"Blind Faith" (live at the HMV Forum)	4:41
4.	"Hypest Hype" (live at the HMV Forum)	3:44
5.	"End Credits" (music video)	3:31
6.	"Let You Go" (music video)	4:05
7.	"Hypest Hype" (music video)	4:04
8.	"Blind Faith" (music video)	4:18
9.	"Photo Gallery"

iTunes Store original deluxe edition
No.	Title	Length
16.	"No More Idols" (mini mix)	10:15
17.	"No More Idols – Live EPK" (live video)	3:46
18.	"Fire in Your Eyes" (live at the HMV Forum)	4:25
19.	"Let You Go" (live at the HMV Forum)	4:01
20.	"Blind Faith" (live at the HMV Forum)	4:41
21.	"Hypest Hype" (live at the HMV Forum)	3:44
Total length:		89:38

iTunes Store platinum edition: disc 2 – remixes
No.	Title	Length
1.	"Time" (Live Lounge version)	4:48
2.	"Rope" (Live Lounge version)	4:28
3.	"End Credits" (VIP mix)	4:54
4.	"Let You Go" (Nero remix)	5:16
5.	"Let You Go" (Brookes Brothers remix)	4:47
6.	"Let You Go" (Feed Me remix)	3:44
7.	"Let You Go" (Chase & Status VIP mix)	3:32
8.	"Blind Faith" (MJ Cole remix)	6:10
9.	"Blind Faith" (Loadstar remix)	4:13
10.	"Blind Faith" (Trolley Snatcha remix)	5:08
11.	"Time" (Chase & Status Champagne Bubbler remix)	4:36
12.	"Time" (Wilkinson remix)	4:52
13.	"Time" (Kamuki House remix)	4:21
14.	"Time" (Kev Willow remix)	4:14
15.	"Hitz" (Wretch 32 remix)	3:30
16.	"Hitz" (16bit remix)	4:13
17.	"Hitz" (Delta Heavy remix)	4:36
18.	"Hitz" (Dillon Francis remix)	4:17

iTunes Store platinum edition: disc 3 – music videos
No.	Title	Length
1.	"End Credits"	3:31
2.	"Let You Go"	4:05
3.	"Hypest Hype"	4:04
4.	"Blind Faith"	4:18
5.	"Time"	3:51
6.	"Hitz"	3:25
7.	"Flashing Lights" (live at The Academy, 2011)	4:21
8.	"Fool Yourself" (live at The Academy, 2011)	4:44
9.	"Blind Faith" (live at Glastonbury, 2011)	4:45
10.	"Let You Go" (live at Glastonbury, 2011)	4:24

Australian tour edition DVD: Live at Brixton Academy
No.	Title	Length
1.	"No Problem"
2.	"Eastern Jam"
3.	"Fire in You Eyes"
4.	"Hypest Hype"
5.	"End Credits"
6.	"Flashing Lights"
7.	"Streetlife"
8.	"Hocus Pocus"
9.	"Take Me Away"
10.	"Brixton Briefcase"
11.	"Pieces"
12.	"Let You Go"
13.	"Midnight Caller"
14.	"Heartbeat"
15.	"Time"
16.	"Blind Faith"
17.	"Hitz"
18.	"Fool Yourself"

== Personnel ==
Chase & Status

- Saul Milton – producer, mixing
- Will Kennard – producer, mixing

Additional musicians

- Andy Gangadeen – drums (tracks 2, 3, 6)
- MC Rage – vocals (track 5)
- Mali McCalla – vocals (track 3)
- Harry McVeigh – vocals (track 12)
- Ben Drew – producer (tracks 5, 13, 15)
- Nick Douwma – producer (track 11)
- Takura Tendayi – additional vocals (tracks 1, 6)
- Yolanda Quartey – additional vocals (track 4)
- Mikkel Storleer Eriksen – keyboards, strings (track 4)
- Tor Erik Hermansen – keyboards, strings (track 4)
- Rick Nowels – co-producer (track 9)
- Graham Marsh – vocal engineer (track 9)
- Dean Reid – vocal engineer (track 9)
- Tim Goalan – assistant engineer (track 9)

Other personnel

- John Oakely – executive producer, photography
- Carsten – photography
- Ian Hunter – photography
- Sam Neill – photography
- Søren Solkær Starbird – photography
- Bob Torrez – cover photo
- Traffic – art direction, design

== Charts ==
=== Weekly charts ===
Chart (2011)	Peak position
Australian Albums (ARIA)	93
Belgian Albums (Ultratop Flanders)	36
Danish Albums (Hitlisten)	34
Irish Albums (IRMA)	50
New Zealand Albums (RMNZ)	29
UK Albums (Official Charts)	2
UK Dance Albums (Official Charts)	1

=== Year-end charts ===
Chart (2011)	Position
UK Albums (OCC)	17
Chart (2012)	Position
UK Albums (OCC)	89
Chart (2013)	Position
UK Albums (OCC)	168

=== Decade-end charts ===
Chart (2010–2019)	Position
UK Albums (OCC)	82

== Certifications ==
Region	Certification	Certified units/sales
New Zealand (RMNZ)	Platinum	15,000^{‡}
United Kingdom (BPI)	3× Platinum	900,000^{‡}
^{‡} Sales+streaming figures based on certification alone.

== Release history ==
Region	Date	Label	Format
United Kingdom	28 January 2011	Mercury	Digital download
United Kingdom	31 January 2011	Mercury	CD
