= Brand New Machine =

Studio album by Chase & Status
- Released: 7 October 2013
- Recorded: 2012–13
- Genre: Drum and bass; downtempo; hip-hop; house; UK garage
- Length: 54:44
- Label: Mercury; MTA; Vertigo; RAM
- Producer: Chase & Status; Major Lazer; Moody Good; Skrillex; Andy C

Chase & Status chronology
No More Idols (2011)	Brand New Machine (2013)	London Bars (2015)

Singles from Brand New Machine
- 1. "Lost & Not Found" Released: 24 June 2013; 2. "Count on Me" Released: 29 September 2013; 3. "Alive" Released: 15 December 2013; 4. "Blk & Blu" Released: 16 March 2014

Professional ratings
Aggregate scores
Source	Rating
Metacritic	60/100
Review scores
Source	Rating
AllMusic	3.5/5 stars
The Arts Desk	4/5 stars
Evening Standard	4/5 stars
Gigwise	9/10
The Guardian	3/5 stars
The Independent	2/5 stars
The Music	3/5 stars
musicOMH	4/5 stars
NME	6/10
The Observer	2/5 stars

Brand New Machine is the third studio album by English drum and bass production duo Chase & Status. It was released on 7 October 2013 by MTA Records under exclusive license to Mercury Records. The album features vocal contributions from a new wave of British talent, including Louis M^ttrs, Moko, Jacob Banks and Elli Ingram, as well as contributions from Major Lazer, Nile Rodgers and rapper Pusha T. The duo toured the album with an arena tour beginning on 31 October 2013. They also headlined 1Xtra Live at the Bournemouth International Centre on the same day as the release of the album.

== Background and release ==
The promotional single "Big Man" featuring Liam Bailey was released through online retailers on 16 October 2012, although a free download was offered through their official website. The song features as a bonus track on the American edition of the album. "Lost & Not Found", the lead single, was the first standard album track to be premiered almost a year after "Big Man". It was followed by "Count on Me", the album's second single. "Machine Gun" was uploaded to their SoundCloud and sent to radio stations in August 2013 as a precursor to the album. On 28 September, the duo appeared on MistaJam's BBC Radio 1Xtra show for a guest mix, in which they premiered several album tracks including "International" and "Gangsta Boogie". Will, better known as Status, appeared once again on MistaJam's show on 2 October 2013 to talk about the album track-by-track. Several more album tracks were premiered on the show: "Alive", "Breathing" and "Pressure". The following day, short previews of each standard edition album track were uploaded to Chase & Status' official YouTube channel.

== Musical concept and songs ==
The duo created a Spotify playlist consisting of some songs that influenced the creation of the album. They cite Massive Attack, MJ Cole, Breach, Soul II Soul, Snap! and Nas among others as key influences for the album. You can hear the MJ Cole influence in "Blk & Blu", as well as the Nas influence in "Gangsta Boogie". Other tracks, such as "Breathing" and "Alive", are drum and bass songs, adopting their original style that helped the duo rise to fame. The duo were also influenced by Pusha T, who they managed to get to vocal their trap song "Machine Gun". The Major Lazer collaboration "Pressure" is a moombahton track, a genre that Diplo has brought to fame. The style is a new venture for Chase & Status.

== Singles ==
"Lost & Not Found", featuring vocals from Brighton-based Louis M^ttrs, was released as the album's lead single on 24 June 2013. The track was initially released on Clubland 23 before its official single release, meaning the release date was brought forward by a week. A music video to accompany the release of "Lost & Not Found" was first released onto YouTube on 4 July 2013 at a total length of five minutes and eight seconds. "Count on Me", featuring vocals from British singer and songwriter Moko, was released as the album's second single on 29 September 2013. A two-and-a-half minute version of the song originally premiered back in July, before the full mix was premiered on 29 August 2013. The music video was released via the band's official website on 20 September 2013, originally through a JavaScript modification of Twitter. The track entered at number five on the UK Singles Chart on 6 October 2013. "Machine Gun", featuring vocals from Pusha T, premiered on 21 August 2013 as a promotional single. It entered the UK Singles Chart at number 114 without independent release. However, it received frequent airplay on BBC Radio 1Xtra. Upon the album release, "International" charted at number 116 supported by sales of the Skrillex remix. "Alive", featuring vocals from Jacob Banks, was released as the album's third single on 15 December 2013. It was performed on Later... with Jools Holland on 8 November 2013. It managed to enter the UK Dance Chart at number 16 prior to independent release, later rising to number 26 in the UK Singles Chart. The song received a surge in popularity due to featuring in the FIFA 14 for Xbox One and PlayStation 4 trailer. "Blk & Blu" was released as the album's fourth single on 16 March 2014. It peaked at number 52 on the UK Singles Chart. A video for "International" was released on 6 August, and a remix by Dimension was released for free download on the same day.

=== Other songs ===
"Big Man" was released as a promotional download on 16 October 2012, both for free and on retailers. The song managed to enter the UK Singles Chart at number 68 and features as a bonus track on the American release of the album.

"Gun Metal Grey" and "Like That" were both used as backing tracks in the pilot of the BBC three-part documentary Reggie Yates' Extreme Russia.

== Track listing ==
No.	Title	Writer(s)	Producer(s)	Length
1.	"Gun Metal Grey"	William Kennard; Saul Milton; Patrick Williams; Andy Gangadeen	Chase & Status	3:02
2.	"International"	Kennard; Milton; Philip Thomas; Chris Lane; John MacGillivray	Chase & Status	4:12
3.	"Count on Me" (featuring Moko)	Kennard; Milton; Zane Lowe; Henry Ritson; Diane Nadia Adu-Gyamfi	Chase & Status; Hal Ritson^{[d]}	3:33
4.	"Blk & Blu" (featuring Ed Thomas)	Kennard; Milton; E. Thomas	Chase & Status	5:20
5.	"Pressure" (featuring Major Lazer)	Kennard; Milton; Thomas Wesley Pentz; Andre Gray	Chase & Status; Major Lazer^{[b]}	4:38
6.	"Machine Gun" (featuring Pusha T)	Kennard; Milton; Terrence Thornton	Chase & Status	3:15
7.	"Gangsta Boogie" (featuring Knytro)	Kennard; Milton; Matthew Guthrie	Chase & Status; Moody Good^{[a]}	3:10
8.	"Heaven Knows" (featuring Elli Ingram)	Kennard; Milton; Ingram	Chase & Status	3:47
9.	"Lost & Not Found" (featuring Louis M^ttrs)	Kennard; Milton; Louis Collard-Watson	Chase & Status	4:13
10.	"Like That" (featuring Moko)	Kennard; Milton; Adu; Toby Young	Chase & Status	3:58
11.	"Deeper Devotion"	Kennard; Milton; Rob Swaden	Chase & Status	4:36
12.	"Breathing" (featuring Bo Saris)	Kennard; Milton; Boris Titulaer; Young	Chase & Status; Bo Saris^{[d]}	4:29
13.	"What Is Right" (featuring Nile Rodgers and Abigail Wyles)	Kennard; Milton; Rodgers; Wyles; Holly Simpson	Chase & Status	3:58
14.	"Alive" (featuring Jacob Banks)	Kennard; Milton; Banks; Young	Chase & Status	3:26

Deluxe edition bonus tracks
No.	Title	Writer(s)	Producer(s)	Length
15.	"International" (Skrillex Remix)	Kennard; Milton; P. Thomas; Lane; MacGillivray	Chase & Status; Sonny Moore^{[c]}	3:59
16.	"Gangsta Boogie VIP" (featuring Knytro)	Kennard; Milton; Guthrie	Chase & Status; Moody Good^{[a]}	4:18
17.	"Wickedest Man" (featuring Riko Dan)	Kennard; Milton; Zane Williams	Chase & Status	2:25
18.	"Count on Me" (featuring Moko) (Andy C Remix)	Kennard; Milton; Lowe; Ritson; Adu	Chase & Status; Andrew John Clarke^{[c]}	4:18
19.	"Chase & Status (Live)" (video)			2:34

American bonus track
No.	Title	Writer(s)	Producer(s)	Length
15.	"Big Man" (featuring Liam Bailey)	Kennard; Milton; Bailey	Chase & Status	3:41

Double vinyl
No.	Title	Length
1.	"International"	4:12
2.	"Machine Gun" (featuring Pusha T)	3:15
3.	"Gangsta Boogie VIP" (featuring Knytro)	4:18
4.	"Breathing" (featuring Bo Saris)	4:29

Notes

- ^{^a} signifies an additional producer
- ^{^b} signifies a co-producer
- ^{^c} signifies a remixer
- ^{^d} signifies a vocal producer
- "Gun Metal Grey" features uncredited vocals from MC Rage.
- "Pressure" features uncredited vocals from Suku.
- "Deeper Devotion" features uncredited vocals from Yolanda Quartey.

Sample credits

- "International" contains samples of the Cutty Ranks song "The Stopper".
- "Count on Me" contains elements of "I Know", performed by New Atlantic and composed by Cameron Saunders and Rick Lloyd.

== Personnel ==
Chase & Status

- Saul Milton – producer
- Will Kennard – producer, mixing

Additional musicians

- Andy Gangadeen – drums (1, 2, 8, 10, 13)
- Patrick "MC Rage" Williams – vocals (1)
- Abigail Wyles – vocals (13)
- Andre "Suku" Gray – vocals (5)
- Andrew John "Andy C" Clarke – remixer (18)
- Boris "Bo Saris" Titulaer – vocals, vocal production (12)
- Chris Lane – production (sampled) (2)
- David Rodigan – vocals (sampled) (7, 16)
- Edwin "Moody Good" Jeffries – additional production (7, 16)
- Ed Thomas – vocals (4)
- Elli Ingram – vocals (8)
- Diane Nadia "Moko" Adu-Gyamfi – vocals (3, 10)
- Henry "Hal" Ritson – keyboards, vocal production (3)
- Holly Simpson – piano, strings (13)
- Jacob Banks – vocals (14)
- John MacGillivray – production (sampled) (2)
- Louis "M^ttrs" Collard-Watson – vocals (9)
- Matthew "Knytro" Guthrie – vocals (7, 16)
- Nile Rodgers – guitar (13)
- Philip "Cutty Ranks" Thomas – vocals (sampled) (2)
- Rob MacFarlane – engineer
- Rob Swaden – management, additional production (11)
- Sonny "Skrillex" Moore – remixer (15)
- Terrence "Pusha T" Thornton – vocals, beatboxing (6)
- Thomas Wesley "Diplo" Pentz – co-production (5)
- Toby Young – writer (10, 12, 14)
- Yolanda Quartey – additional vocals (3), vocals (11)
- Zane Lowe – writer (3)
- Zane "Riko Dan" Williams – vocals (17)

Other personnel

- Alan Sailer – cover photography
- Andrew Cotterill – band photography
- Jho Oakley – management
- Mat Maitland – art direction

== Charts ==
=== Weekly charts ===
Chart (2013)	Peak position
Australian Albums (ARIA)	38
Belgian Albums (Ultratop Flanders)	55
Belgian Albums (Ultratop Wallonia)	167
Irish Albums (IRMA)	83
New Zealand Albums (RMNZ)	26
Scottish Albums (OCC)	5
UK Albums (OCC)	2
UK Dance Albums (OCC)	1

=== Year-end charts ===
Chart (2013)	Position
UK Albums (OCC)	115

== Release history ==
Region	Date	Label	Format
Various	7 October 2013	MTA; Mercury	Digital download; CD
