= Tribe (Chase & Status album) =

Studio album by Chase & Status
- Released: 18 August 2017
- Length: 68:07
- Label: AMF; Virgin EMI
- Producer: Chase & Status

Chase & Status chronology
London Bars (2015)	Tribe (2017)	Rtrn II Jungle (2019)

Singles from Tribe
- 1. "Control" Released: 23 February 2016; 2. "All Goes Wrong" Released: 23 September 2016; 3. "This Moment" Released: 10 May 2017; 4. "Love Me More" Released: 13 July 2017

Tribe is the fourth studio album by English drum and bass production duo Chase & Status, which was self-released on 18 August 2017 under exclusive license to Mercury Records. The album includes the singles "Control" (featuring Slaves), "All Goes Wrong" (featuring Tom Grennan), "This Moment" (with Blossoms), and "Love Me More" (featuring Emeli Sandé).

== Track listing ==
All songs produced by Chase & Status.

No.	Title	Writer(s)	Length
1.	"Big Man Skank" (featuring Mr. Vegas)	William Kennard; Saul Milton; Henry Allen; Lowell Dunbar; Steven Michael Marsden; Donat Mittoo; Thomas Pentz; Robert Shakespeare; Clifford Smith; Daniel Stein	4:20
2.	"Dubplate Original" (featuring Kano)	Kennard; Milton; Kane Robinson	3:45
3.	"Love Me More" (featuring Emeli Sandé)	Kennard; Milton; Robert Matthews; Catherine Pockson; Adele Sandé	4:00
4.	"Step Away" (featuring MC Singing Fats)	Kennard; Milton; Wildale Spencer	4:07
5.	"Reload" (featuring Craig David)	Kennard; Milton; David	3:15
6.	"All Goes Wrong" (featuring Tom Grennan)	Kennard; Milton; Grennan; Nathaniel Ledwidge; Dean McIntosh; Kieron McIntosh	3:25
7.	"Tribes"	Kennard; Milton	3:21
8.	"NRG" (featuring Novelist)	Kennard; Milton; Kojo Kankam	3:14
9.	"Real No More" (featuring Shy FX and Kiko Bun)	Kennard; Milton; Federico Marin; Euvin Spencer; Andre Williams	3:39
10.	"Don't Stop" (featuring Bugzy Malone)	Kennard; Milton; Aaron Davis	3:46
11.	"Tribute"	Kennard; Milton	5:46
12.	"Crawling"	Kennard; Milton; John Newman; John Ryan; Dan Wilson	4:02
13.	"Know About We" (featuring Deepee, Littlez, Knine, Sleeks, Inch and Swift)	Kennard; Milton; Fabian Browne; Jordan Duncan; Bradley George; Ryan Lyle; Kemoy Rhoden; Terell Rookwood	5:13
14.	"Nervous" (featuring Rage)	Kennard; Milton; Patrick Williams; Takura Tendayi	4:40
15.	"This Moment" (with Blossoms)	Kennard; Milton; Tom Ogden	3:35
16.	"Control" (featuring Slaves)	Kennard; Milton; Christian Dyas; Isaac Holman; Phillip Stanton; Laurence Vincent; Christopher Wink	4:10
17.	"Know Your Name" (featuring Seinabo Sey)	Kennard; Milton; Sey	3:55
Total length:			01:08:07

== Charts ==
Chart performance for Tribe
Chart (2017)	Peak position
UK Albums (OCC)	7
UK Dance Albums (OCC)	2

== Certifications ==
Region	Certification	Certified units/sales
United Kingdom (BPI)	Silver	60,000^{‡}
^{‡} Sales+streaming figures based on certification alone.
