= Nadiah Adu-Gyamfi =

- Also known as: Nadiah Adu-Gyamfi, Moko
- Born: Diane Nadia Adu-Gyamfi; October 29, 1991 (age 34); New Cross, London, England
- Origin: Ghana
- Genres: Soul, trip hop, dance
- Occupations: Singer, songwriter
- Years active: 2013–present
- Labels: MTA, Virgin EMI

Diane Nadia Adu-Gyamfi (born 1991), better known by her stage names Moko or Nadiah Adu-Gyamfi, is a Ghanaian-British soul singer. She rose to fame after featuring on the Chase & Status single "Count on Me". Moko has released two EPs, Black (2013) and Gold (2014), on MTA and Virgin EMI. Under the stage name Nadiah Adu-Gyamfi, she won the £500,000 jackpot on ITV music game show Walk the Line in December 2021.

== Early life and education ==
Moko was born and raised in New Cross, London. Her mother is of Ghanaian descent and her grandmother is Chinese. She began singing in her local church choir as a child. She enrolled on a music scheme at Goldsmiths, University of London when she was 15 years old, and later returned to the university to study English literature, practising in the institution's music facilities in her spare time.

Moko has spoken about her experiences with the neurological condition chromesthesia, in which sounds invoke images of colour: "I always had to listen to each song with my eyes shut, because then I could feel technicolour circles and holograms inside of my eyelids. After a while, I’d associate certain colours with sounds. It’s always been a part of me, so sharing it with the world is really nice."

== Music career ==
During her studies at Goldsmiths, Moko began recording music with two of her fellow students, a production duo called the Impostors. She debuted the song "Summon the Strength" online in February 2013, followed by "Hand on Heart" in May 2013. The same month, Moko performed with Rocket Number Nine and Neneh Cherry on the internet channel Boiler Room TV. She subsequently headlined the BBC Introducing stage at that year's Glastonbury Festival.

Dance producers Chase & Status featured Moko on two tracks on their album Brand New Machine (released in October 2013): "Count on Me" and "Like That". The former track was released as a single in September 2013 and peaked at number five on the UK Singles Chart. Moko signed to the duo's own label, MTA Records (part of Virgin EMI Records), and in October 2013 she released her debut EP, Black (produced in its entirety by the Impostors), and a video for its track "Freeze". During October and November 2013, she supported Chase & Status on their Brand New Machine UK arena tour.

In 2014, Moko collaborated with singer-producer MNEK on the track "Judgement Day", which is scheduled for release as a single from his upcoming debut album. Moko released her second EP, Gold, in August 2014, preceded by the single "Your Love". Gold features production from Chase & Status, Kwes, and Two Inch Punch. She was working on a full-length album by early 2015.

Moko appeared under her real name (excluding first name), Nadiah Adu-Gyamfi on ITV's music game show, Walk the Line in December 2021, winning episodes 4, 5 and 6 - winning the £500,000 jackpot.

== Artistry ==
Moko has cited 1990s music as an influence on her own output, including artists such as Massive Attack, Shara Nelson, Portishead, Sade, Soul II Soul, Candi Staton, and TLC. During her childhood, she was exposed to Afrobeat and Ghanaian folk music as well as Fleetwood Mac and Aretha Franklin. She describes her musical style as "alternative electronic soul". As a performer, Moko takes inspiration from Asian, rhythm and blues, and West African dance traditions.

DIY has called Moko a "trip hop revivalist", with NME describing her as "southeast London's answer to Massive Attack". The Independent named Moko one of "dance's new leading ladies" in 2014 and compared her success to that of Ella Eyre and Becky Hill.

== Discography ==
=== Extended plays ===
- Black (2013)
- Gold (2014)

=== As featured artist ===
Title	Year	Peak chart positions						Album
Title	Year	UK	UK Dance	BEL	DEN	IRE	SCO	Album
"Count on Me" (Chase & Status featuring Moko)	2013	5	1	36	–	49	7	Brand New Machine
"Like That" (Chase & Status featuring Moko)	2013	–	–	–	—	—	—	Brand New Machine
"Hurts" (Kove featuring Moko)	2015	–	—	—	—	—	—	TBA
