= End Credits =

2009 single by Plan B and Chase & Status

Single by Chase & Status featuring Plan B

from the album No More Idols
- Released: 29 October 2009
- Recorded: 2009
- Genre: Drum and bass
- Length: 3:19
- Label: Vertigo; RAM
- Songwriters: Will Kennard; Saul Milton; Ben Drew
- Producers: Chase & Status; Plan B

Chase & Status singles chronology
| "Against All Odds" (2009) | "End Credits" (2009) | "Let You Go" (2010) |

Plan B singles chronology
| "Shifty" (2009) | "End Credits" (2009) | "Stay Too Long" (2010) |

Music video
- "End Credits" on YouTube

"End Credits" is the first single to be taken from drum and bass duo Chase & Status' second studio album, No More Idols. The single was co-written, co-produced and features vocals from Plan B, and was released on 29 October 2009, peaking at number nine on the UK Singles Chart.

== Background ==
The song was used in a trailer for the video game F1 2010, and featured also in-game, as well as serving as the official theme from the Michael Caine film Harry Brown, in which Drew co-starred. The track has been covered by Jess Mills as a B-side for her 2011 single, "Live For What I'd Die For". The track also appeared in series 8, episode 2 of British comedy-drama Shameless in 2011. The main chord sequence of the song has been noted for its similarity to Radiohead's track, "Reckoner". The music video for "End Credits" was directed by Kim Gehrig, and features footage from Harry Brown. The promotional CD single features alternate artwork to the official release, and instead portrays Michael Caine pointing a gun (likely at Plan B). The VIP version of the track was released through RAM Records in the UK as a double AA-side of the VIP mix of "Is It Worth It", a track from the duo's debut album More Than Alot with vocals from Takura Tendayi.

== Critical reception ==
Fraser McAlpine of BBC Chart Blog gave the song a positive review stating: "Perhaps buoyed by the success of Pendulum's radio-friendly take on drum'n'bass, London duo Chase & Status experimented with elements of hip-hop, indie and even Bollywood on last year's debut album More Than Alot. So well-regarded were the results that they landed the pair – Saul Milton and Will Kennard – a production gig on the new Rihanna album. Now, making the most of the buzz, they're back with new single 'End Credits'. Kicking off with a simple guitar riff that could almost pass for The Feeling, it's only when the beats drop around the minute mark that this becomes an identifiably Chase & Status affair. Combining their thumpingly effective d&b beats with strings, more guitars and Plan B's tender vocals, 'End Credits' has a soaring, cinematic feel while remaining perky enough to pack out the dancefloor. Proof positive, then, why Chase & Status are now being sought out by pop A-listers"..

== Track listing ==
CD single
| No. | Title | Writer(s) | Length |
|---|---|---|---|
| 1. | "End Credits" | Milton; Kennard; Ben Drew | 3:19 |
| 2. | "End Credits" (VIP mix) | Milton; Kennard; Ben Drew | 4:49 |
| 3. | "End Credits" (live version) | Milton; Kennard; Ben Drew | 4:14 |
| 4. | "End Credits" (music video) | Milton; Kennard; Ben Drew | 3:37 |

12" single / 12" picture disc
| No. | Title | Writer(s) | Length |
|---|---|---|---|
| 1. | "End Credits VIP" | Milton; Kennard; Ben Drew | 4:49 |
| 2. | "Is It Worth It VIP" | Saul Milton; Will Kennard | 5:11 |

Digital download single
| No. | Title | Writer(s) | Length |
|---|---|---|---|
| 1. | "End Credits" | Milton; Kennard; Ben Drew | 3:19 |
| 2. | "End Credits" (VIP mix) | Milton; Kennard; Ben Drew | 4:49 |
| 3. | "End Credits" (music video) | Milton; Kennard; Ben Drew | 3:37 |

Digital download EP
| No. | Title | Writer(s) | Length |
|---|---|---|---|
| 1. | "End Credits" | Milton; Kennard; Ben Drew | 3:19 |
| 2. | "End Credits" (VIP mix) | Milton; Kennard; Ben Drew | 4:49 |
| 3. | "End Credits" (live version) | Milton; Kennard; Ben Drew | 4:14 |

== Personnel ==
- Saul Milton – producer, mixing
- Will Kennard – producer, mixing
- Mark Kennedy – engineer
- Rob Swire – mixing
- Stuart Hawkes – mastering
- Plan B – vocals, producer
- Kim Gehrig – video director
- Juliette Larthe – video producer

== Charts ==
=== Weekly charts ===
| Chart (2009–2010) | Peak position |
|---|---|
| Belgium (Ultratop 50 Flanders) | 46 |
| Scottish Singles Sales (Official Charts) | 13 |
| UK Singles (Official Charts) | 9 |
| UK Dance (Official Charts) | 2 |
| UK Singles Downloads (Official Charts) | 8 |

=== Year-end charts ===
| Chart (2009) | Position |
|---|---|
| UK Singles (Official Charts Company) | 169 |
| Chart (2010) | Position |
| UK Singles (Official Charts Company) | 180 |
| Chart (2011) | Position |
| UK Singles (Official Charts Company) | 191 |

== Certifications ==
| Region | Certification | Certified units/sales |
|---|---|---|
| New Zealand (RMNZ) | Platinum | 30,000^{‡} |
| United Kingdom (BPI) | Platinum | 600,000^{‡} |
^{‡} Sales+streaming figures based on certification alone.

== Release history ==
| Region | Date | Format | Label |
|---|---|---|---|
| United Kingdom | 29 October 2009 | Digital download | Mercury |
| United Kingdom | 2 November 2009 | CD single | Mercury |
