= Machine Gun (Chase & Status song) =

Promotional single by Chase & Status featuring Pusha T

from the album Brand New Machine
- Released: 7 October 2013
- Recorded: 2013
- Genre: Hip-hop; trap
- Length: 3:15
- Label: Mercury; MTA; Vertigo; RAM
- Songwriters: Will Kennard; Saul Milton; Terrence Thornton
- Producer: Chase & Status

"Machine Gun" is a song by British record production duo Chase & Status, featuring vocals from American rapper Pusha T. It was released on 7 October 2013 as part of the duo's third studio album Brand New Machine (2013). It entered the UK Singles Chart at number 114 and the UK Dance Chart at number 21.

== Background and release ==
Chase & Status cite Pusha as one of the influences for the album and were pleased to get him on a feature. "Machine Gun" premiered via the duo's SoundCloud page on 21 August 2013 and received frequent radio play throughout 2013 on BBC Radio 1Xtra. Digital downloads of the individual track from Brand New Machine caused it to enter the UK Singles Chart at number 114 and the UK Dance Chart at number 21.

== Track listing ==
Album version
No.	Title	Length
6.	"Machine Gun" (featuring Pusha T)	3:15

== Personnel ==
- Will Kennard – producer, mixing
- Saul Milton – producer, mixing
- Terrence "Pusha T" Thornton – vocals

== Chart performance ==
=== Weekly charts ===
Chart (2014)	Peak position
UK Dance (OCC)	21
UK Singles (OCC)	114

== Release history ==
Country	Release date	Format	Label
United Kingdom	7 October 2013	Digital download	Mercury; MTA; Vertigo; RAM
