= Funny (Chase & Status song) =

Single by Chase & Status
- Released: 6 November 2015
- Length: 2:59
- Label: MTA; Mercury
- Songwriters: Will Kennard; Saul Milton
- Producer: Chase & Status

Chase & Status singles chronology
"Blk & Blu" (2014)	"Funny" (2015)	"More Ratatatin" (2015)

Music video
- "Funny" on YouTube

"Funny" is a song by British record production duo Chase & Status, featuring vocals from Frisco. The song was released as a digital download on 6 November 2015 through MTA Records and Mercury Records. The song peaked at number 96 on the UK Singles Chart. The song is the first of four in their London Bars project, a series of singles released in collaboration with grime MCs throughout November 2015.

== Music video ==
A music video to accompany the release of "Funny" was first released onto YouTube on 5 November 2015 at a total length of four minutes and eleven seconds.

== Track listing ==
Digital download
No.	Title	Length
1.	"Funny" (featuring Frisco)	2:59

== Chart performance ==
=== Weekly charts ===
Chart (2013)	Peak position
UK Singles (Official Charts)	96

== Release history ==
Region	Date	Format	Label
United Kingdom	6 November 2015	Digital download	MTA; Mercury
