= Tempa T =

British grime MC

- Also known as: Tempz
- Born: Nicky Nyarko-Dei; 9 October 1984 (age 41); Forest Gate, London, England
- Genres: Grime
- Occupation: Rapper
- Years active: 2000–present
- Formerly of: Slew Dem

Nicky Nyarko-Dei (born 7 October 1985), known by his stage name Tempa T, is a British grime MC originating from East London. He is well known for his 2009 single "Next Hype", considered an anthem of the UK underground scene, from which he is known for his excitable nature, aggressive lyrics, love of word play and use of the phrases "hype" and "par". He is featured on "Hypest Hype" by Chase & Status and is a former member of east London-based grime crew Slew Dem. In 2015, Tempa T released the single, "Shell", produced by So Real Sounds, which reached number one for eight weeks in the UK Grime Chart show with DJ Cameo on BBC Radio 1xtra.

== Music career ==
His first public performance was in 2006 with Mike Crosby from Greater Manchester, SlewDem at The Chantelle Fiddy club night at 333 in Shoreditch. In 2007 he styled himself as an ‘angry Grime MC’ and ‘the hype man’, with his high energy and infectious stage presence. Tempa T's musical career was documented by Neo-Publishing.Inc in 2010 in Tempa T: Reviewing the Hype So Far. In May 2014, Tempa T announced his debut album Pre the Baitness for release in July of the same year.

== Discography ==
Albums

Year	Title	References
2012	All-Star Pars	-
2014	Pree the Baitness	-
2018	It's Bait It's Bait	-

=== Mixtapes ===
List of mixtapes, with selected chart positions
Title	Mixtape details	Peak chart positions	
Title	Mixtape details	UK	UK DL
All-Star Pars	Release: 21 December 2012; Label: DEFENDERS ENTERTAINMENT; Formats: Digital download, CD	99	99
"—" denotes a recording that did not chart or was not released in that territory.

EPs

Year	Title	References
2006	Spray Dem (Prod. DJJJ)	-
2009	Next Hype (Remixes)	-
2012	Say It Right Now (Remixes)	-

=== Singles ===
Title	Year	Peak chart positions		Album
Title	Year	UK	IRE	Album
"Next Hype"	2009	—	—	Non-album singles

=== As a featured artist ===
Title	Year	Peak chart positions		Certifications	Album
Title	Year	UK	IRE	Certifications	Album
"CD is Dead" (with JME)	2010	—	—		Blam!
"Hypest Hype" (with Chase & Status)	2010	70	—	BPI: Silver	No More Idols
"Rari WorkOut" (Lethal Bizzle featuring JME and Tempa T)	2014	11	—	BPI: Gold	—N/a

== Film career ==
He appeared in the 2010 British film Shank as himself, performing "Next Hype" on Tim and Barry TV.

He appeared in the 2016 British film Gangsters, Gamblers and Geezers as a member of the gym.

== Personal life ==
He is a supporter of Manchester United.
