= Machine Gun Kelly =

Machine Gun Kelly most often refers to:

- Machine Gun Kelly (gangster) (1895–1954), Prohibition era American gangster
- MGK (born 1990), American actor and musician formerly known as "Machine Gun Kelly"

Machine Gun Kelly may also refer to:

- Machine-Gun Kelly (film), 1958 film about the gangster
- Harry "Machine Gun" Kelly (born 1961), American basketball player
- M. G. Kelly (born 1952), American radio disk jockey
- Kelly Williams (born 1982), Filipino-American basketball player whose moniker is "Machine Gun" Kelly
- "Machine Gun Kelly", a song recorded by James Taylor on his album Mud Slide Slim and the Blue Horizon
- Machine Gun Kelly, a 1994 album by Wesley Willis
- "Machine Gun Kelly", a song by Angelic Upstarts from Last Tango in Moscow

== See also ==
- "Shotgun Tom" Kelly (born 1949), American radio and television personality
