= Count On Me (Chase & Status song) =

"Count on Me"
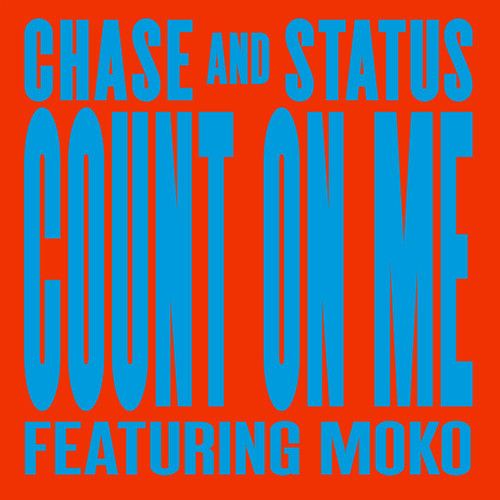

Single by Chase & Status featuring Moko

from the album Brand New Machine
- B-side: "Count on Me" (Andy C Remix)
- Released: 29 September 2013
- Length: 3:32
- Label: Mercury; MTA; RAM
- Songwriters: Will Kennard; Saul Milton; Zane Lowe; Henry Ritson; Nadiah Adu-Gyamfi
- Producer: Chase & Status

Chase & Status singles chronology
"Lost & Not Found" (2013)	"Count on Me" (2013)	"Alive" (2013)

Moko singles chronology
"Count On Me" (2013)	"Your Love" (2014)

Music video
- "Count on Me" on YouTube

"Count on Me" is a song by British record production duo Chase & Status, featuring vocals from British singer Moko (also known as Nadiah Adu-Gyamfi). It was released as the second single from their third studio album Brand New Machine on 29 September 2013. The single peaked at number five on the UK Singles Chart.

== Background and release ==
A shortened edit of "Count on Me" premiered on UKF Music's YouTube channel on 27 July 2013, at a total length of two minutes and thirty-one seconds. The full version premiered with the official music video on 22 September. The Nathan C remix which appears on the extended play was originally a bootleg but was heard by the duo and they decided to officially release it. The Andy C remix also features on the deluxe edition of Brand New Machine. "Count On Me" was performed on Top of the Pops for Christmas 2013 as one of the highlights of the year.

== Music video ==
The official video was first only available to watch through Twitter, using a custom JavaScript code to play the Vevo video on the site and appear on users' Twitter profiles with deliberate coded glitches. The video was later made public through YouTube, at a total length of three minutes and fifty seconds.

== Critical reception ==
Robert Copsey of Digital Spy gave the song a positive review stating:

Londoners Chase & Status may have swung somewhat dramatically to the other end of the drum 'n' bass spectrum for their third album Brand New Machine, but we wouldn't blame a casual music listener if they didn't even bat an eyelid upon hearing the duo's latest single 'Count On Me'.

Because while gone are the heavy dubstep lines and wobbly breakdowns, they've far from lost their knack for a giant chorus, which is demonstrated no better than on their current offering. Aided by a rich and growly vocal supplied by rising soul singer Moko, her looped vocal on the chorus sounds like something straight out of the early '90s techno scene. That said, it's C&S's slick and strobing production that hauls it firmly back to the present day..

== Track listing ==
Digital download – single
No.	Title	Length
1.	"Count on Me" (featuring Moko)	3:32

Digital download – EP
No.	Title	Length
1.	"Count on Me" (Steve Angello Remix)	5:32
2.	"Count on Me" (Andy C Remix)	4:18
3.	"Count on Me" (Nathan C Remix)	5:06
4.	"Lost & Not Found" (featuring Louis M^ttrs) (acoustic version))	2:50

12" vinyl
No.	Title	Length
1.	"Count on Me" (featuring Moko)	3:32
2.	"Count on Me" (Andy C Remix)	4:18

== Personnel ==
- Will "Status" Kennard – production, mixing
- Saul "Chase" Milton – production, mixing, keyboards, drum programming
- Nadiah Adu-Gyamfi (aka Moko) – vocals
- Yolanda Quartey – additional vocals
- Henry "Hal" Ritson – keyboards, vocal production, additional bass
- Zane Lowe – writer
- Rob MacFarlane – engineer
- Cameron Saunders – sample clearance, special thanks
- Rick Lloyd – sample clearance, special thanks

== Chart performance ==
=== Weekly charts ===
Weekly chart performance for "Count On Me"
Chart (2013)	Peak position
Belgium (Ultratop 50 Flanders)	36
Hungary (Rádiós Top 40)	29
Ireland (IRMA)	49
Scotland Singles (Official Charts)	7
UK Dance (Official Charts)	1
UK Singles (Official Charts)	5
UK Official Streaming Chart Top 100	28

=== Year-end charts ===
Year-end chart performance for "Count On Me"
Chart (2013)	Position
UK Singles (Official Charts Company)	158

== Certifications ==
Certifications for "Count On Me"
Region	Certification	Certified units/sales
United Kingdom (BPI)	Gold	400,000^{‡}
^{‡} Sales+streaming figures based on certification alone.

== Release history ==
Release history and formats for "Count On Me"
Region	Date	Format	Label
Various	29 September 2013	Digital download; vinyl	Mercury; MTA; RAM
