= Live My Life (album) =

Studio album by Boris
- Released: January 30, 2009
- Genre: Soul, funk, R&B, pop
- Length: 52:03
- Label: Upper Room / Rough Trade
- Producer: Antoon Tolsma (DutchFlower); Michael Johnson (Mixzo); Marcus Machado; Boris Titulaer

Boris chronology
Holy Pleasure (2006)	Live My Life (2009)

Singles from Live My Life
- 1. "If You Wanna Roll With Me" Released: November 7, 2008; 2. "Everything About You" Released: April 20, 2009

Professional ratings
Review scores
Source	Rating
OOR	(very favorable)
Jazzism magazine	4/5 stars
de Volkskrant	3/5 stars
Diary of Cool	5/5 stars

Live My Life is the third studio album by Boris. It was released at 30 January 2009, on the Bo-Rush / Upper Room label, and distributed by Rough Trade Benelux. Main producer is Antoon Tolsma (DutchFlower). The preliminary single "If You Wanna Roll with Me" has been released on 7 November 2008.

The album reached the charts with a number 4 entry during the first week in the Dutch Album Top 100.

== Track listing ==
All songs were written by Boris Titulaer and Anthony Tolsma, except where noted.

1. "Bubblin'" – 2:54
2. "Everything About You" – 3:12
3. "If You Wanna Roll With Me" – 2:26
4. "Stupid Again" – 3:32
5. "Live My Life" (Titulaer, Tolsma, B. Tam) – 3:19
6. "One World" – 3:17
7. "Loosen Up" – 4:30
8. "I'm Sorry" – 3:12
9. "Leave it Alone" (Titulaer, Marcus Machado, Micheal Johnson) – 4:36
10. "The Ohhhh Song" – 3:44
11. "I Want You to Know" (Titulaer, Machado, Johnson) – 4:36
12. "Do You Love Me" (Titulaer, Machado) – 4:59 (+ hidden track – One World (Acoustic))
