= Chase & Status =

English music duo

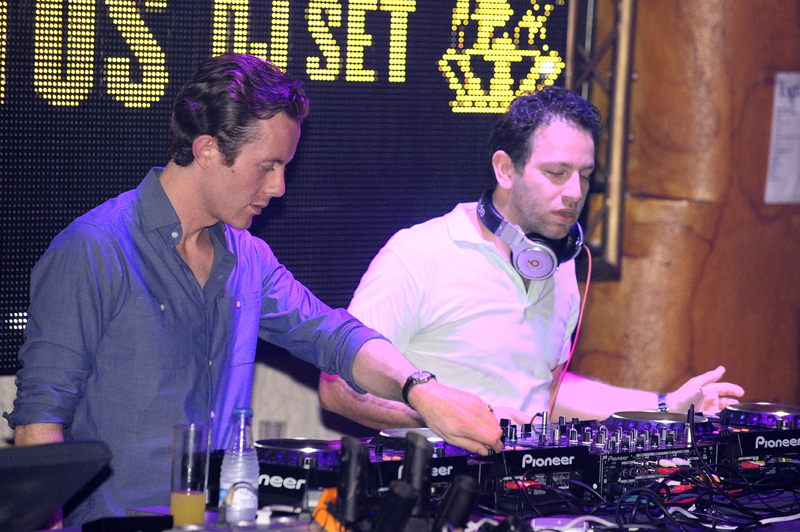
- Status (left) and Chase (right) in 2012

Background information
- Origin: London, England
- Genres: Electronic; drum and bass; big beat; hip-hop
- Years active: 2003–present
- Labels: MTA; RAM; Mercury; Vertigo; Roc Nation
- Members: Saul Milton (Chase); Will Kennard (Status); Live members: Takura Tendayi (Frontman)
- Past members: Patrick Williams (MC Rage)
- Website: chaseandstatus.co.uk

Chase & Status are an English drum and bass duo composed of Saul Milton (Chase) and Will Kennard (Status). In addition, Andy Gangadeen is the drummer when the band performs live. MC Rage formerly performed as MC with the group, but left in July 2021 to focus on solo ventures. The duo are from London, and formed in 2003 after meeting at university in Manchester. The duo have since released seven studio albums and collaborated with major artists such as Plan B, CeeLo Green, Rihanna, Example, Tinie Tempah, and Stormzy. They run the independent record label MTA Records. William Kennard founded ELAM (East London Arts and Music) in 2014.

In 2023–24, Chase & Status won their first Brit Award for "Producer of the Year". Their second consecutive top four album, 2 Ruff, Vol. 1, included four singles in the UK top 40 simultaneously, a feat not achieved by a UK band since 2010. The lead single, "Baddadan", was the highest-charting of the four, peaking at No. 5 in the UK singles chart. In 2024, they achieved a UK number one single with "Backbone", a collaboration with Stormzy. In 2025, Kennard was awarded Member of the Order of the British Empire for "services to music and to creative arts education".

== History ==
=== 2003–2009: Beginnings and More Than Alot ===
Saul Milton (Chase, born June 23, 1981) and Will Kennard (Status, born October 21, 1980) originally met in London through a mutual friend, although they met up again whilst university students in Manchester. Kennard studied History of Art at the University of Manchester, while Milton studied English and Humanities at Manchester Metropolitan University. Kennard decided to drop out of university to pursue a music career, although Milton did manage to achieve an honours in his studies, despite spending most of his time on music. The duo cited the Prodigy and Orbital as major influences on their music and creativity alongside the original jungle and drum & bass scene. They were supported by BBC Radio 1Xtra DJs early in their career, with "Love's Theme", released via DJ Zinc's Bingo Beats, played on air in 2004.

Chase & Status had three number one singles on the UK Dance Singles Chart between 2007 and 2009; the double A-side "Hurt You" / "Sell Me Your Soul" in 2007 and "Take Me Away" / "Judgement (Informer)" in 2008, then on 5 October 2008, they reached number 70 on the UK Singles Chart and number one on the UK Dance Singles Chart again with the single "Pieces" featuring vocals from Plan B. In 2009, they peaked at number 45 with "Against All Odds", which featured UK rapper Kano.

=== 2009–2011: No More Idols ===
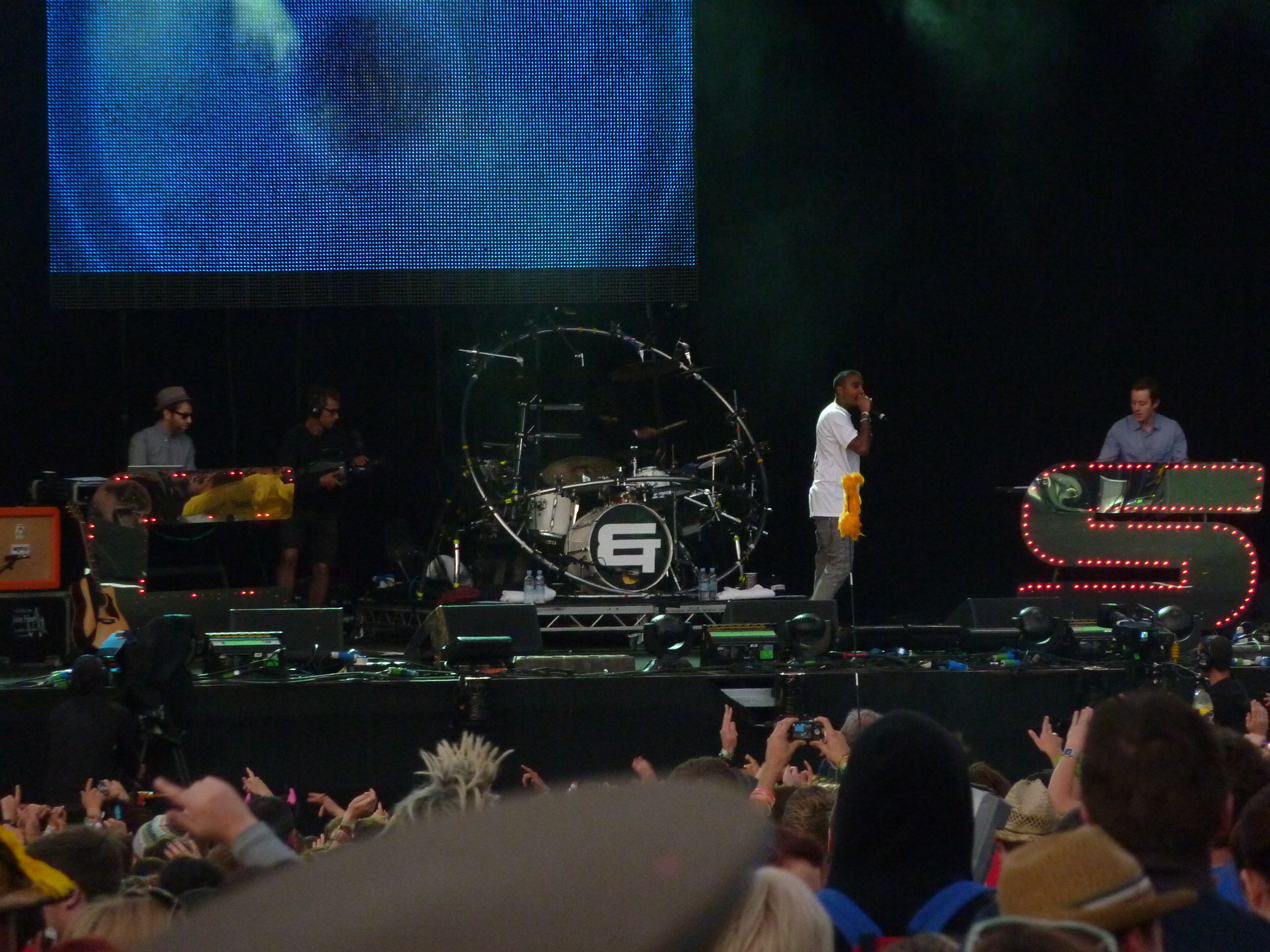
Chase & Status at Bestival 2010

In November 2009, the duo entered the top forty of the UK Singles Chart for the first time with the track "End Credits". The track was released on 2 November 2009 and features Plan B; it reached a peak of number nine on the UK Singles Chart.

The duo released "Let You Go" on 15 August 2010, revealing it to be the second single to be released from their second studio album No More Idols. The single featured vocals from Mali and debuted at number eleven on the UK Singles Chart, marking the duo's second consecutive Top Forty hit. "Hypest Hype" (featuring Tempa T) was confirmed in October 2010 to be the third single from the album. As it was released as a free download from their website on 8 November 2010, it did not qualify to chart. The fourth single from the album is "Blind Faith", which features soul singer/songwriter Liam Bailey and was released in January 2011. Other singles include "Time" (featuring Delilah), "Hitz" (featuring Tinie Tempah) and "Flashing Lights" (with Sub Focus featuring Takura). The album also contains the song "Heavy" with Dizzee Rascal. The album debuted at number two on the UK Albums Chart and was certified gold in the first week of sales by the British Phonographic Industry.

=== 2012–2014: Brand New Machine ===
In contrast to More Than Alot and No More Idols, the new album has a darker sound. The duo performed as a sub-headline on Friday night at Download Festival 2012, provoking an outcry from regular Download enthusiasts (the festival is recognized as a rock/metal festival), not least due to them being higher on the bill than fan favourites Machine Head, who had been subject to an internet campaign to headline the festival. However, they were well received. Chase & Status have also headlined electronic music festival South West Four hosted on London's Clapham Common. Chase & Status: Live at Brixton, a CD/DVD featuring appearances from Tinie Tempah, Liam Bailey, Mali and Delilah, was released on 2 April 2012. On 15 October 2012, the track "Big Man" featuring Liam Bailey was released on the Chase & Status website as a free download. The following day, it was released through online retailers. The music video was also published on 15 October on their YouTube channel and the 'UKFDrumandBass' channel.

On 8 March 2013, the duo were confirmed to headline Saturday night at Roskilde Festival following Metallica at Orange stage. On 11 March 2013, the duo were confirmed through their website to co-headline Saturday night at Reading Festival and Sunday night at Leeds Festival 2013. On 4 June 2013, the album's lead single "Lost & Not Found" featuring Louis M^ttrs was uploaded to the Chase & Status Vevo channel. The digital single was released on 26 June and includes remixes from MTA Records artists Dream Mclean, Kove and Josh Butler. On 17 June 2013, MTA Records announced that newly signed Elli Ingram will support them on tour and feature on the album. On 26 July 2013, they announced the album title to be Brand New Machine. The album's second single "Count On Me" featuring Nadiah Adu-Gyamfi (under her stage-name "Moko") premiered on B.Traits' BBC Radio 1 show on the same day, and the album artwork was released. "Count On Me" was released on 29 September. The album was released on 7 October. On 24 August 2013, they performed on the Main Stage at Reading Festival before Eminem. During the performance, MC Rage had to stop the show due to people being crushed at the front of the crowd. The act was resumed, and finished successfully. They headlined 1Xtra Live in Bournemouth on 7 October, the same day as the album release, and returned to the BIC on their arena tour in November. The band played their first show in India during the multi-genre music festival NH7 Weekender on 20 October 2013.

On 25 July 2014, they headlined Friday night on the mainstage at Global Gathering festival. Despite the performance being a roaring success, attracting the second largest crowd after Saturday headliners the Prodigy, the festival's memory was tainted with the death of a man on the Friday night. For 2014's Red Bull Culture Clash, Chase & Status joined forces with Shy FX, David Rodigan and MC Rage to form the soundsystem Rebel Sound. They went on to win the clash, defeating fellow groups Stone Love Movement, Boy Better Know and ASAP Mob. On 21 and 28 November 2014, they headlined the UK's largest indoor winter music festival, The Big Reunion. On 30 December, they headlined the main stage of Rhythm & Vines

=== 2015: London Bars EP ===
While working on their fourth studio album, the duo began releasing a new grime or British hop-hop track every week. The four songs were released collectively as the London Bars EP on 4 December 2015. The project was also made available on limited 12" vinyl on Record Store Day 2016. All of the tracks from the EP received daytime and night-time airplay on BBC Radio 1Xtra as well as Kiss 100 during its urban specialist shows, although "Wha Gwarn?" featuring Bonkaz was pulled due to the rapper's past conviction and imprisonment for a sex offence, which he continues to deny.

=== 2016–2017: Tribe ===
The duo released their fourth studio album Tribe on 18 August 2017, and featured collaborations with artists such as Craig David, Emeli Sandé, Shy FX and British punk band Soft Play. The album featured much more drum and bass compared to their last album Brand New Machine, taking the band back to the sound which initially made them a commercial success, whilst still experimenting with other genres such as UK garage in the track "Reload" with Craig David and electronic rock in the track "Control" with Soft Play.

=== Remixes and productions ===
The duo have also created a remix version of "Invaders Must Die" for the Prodigy. In Australia, the remix reached fifty three on the Aria Singles Chart and number seven on the Aria Dance Chart. They have also produced for Rihanna numerous times, on her fourth album Rated R, sixth album Talk That Talk and seventh album Unapologetic, as well as producing British singer Rita Ora's number one UK hit, "R.I.P", and co-producing a track on Alexandra Burke's album Overcome. Other remixes include Black Canvas' "Broken Dreams", Dizzee Rascal's "Sirens", Nneka's "Heartbeat" and Capleton's "Who Dem" (renamed "Duppy Man"). Chase & Status also produced a track for singer Example for his second album Won't Go Quietly ("Sick Note") and again for his third album Playing in the Shadows ("Playing in the Shadows"). They also produced Example's unreleased track "Pink Notes" that features on his mixtape The Credit Munch Redux.

== Members ==
- Saul Milton (Chase) – production, mixing, keyboards, programming, guitar (2003–present)
- Will Kennard (Status) – production, mixing, keyboards, programming, engineering, bass guitar (2003–present)

Touring members

- Takura Tendayi (Takura) – MC (2022–present)
- Andy Gangadeen – drums (2009–present)

Former members

- Patrick Williams (MC Rage) – MC (2009–2021)

== Discography ==
- More than Alot (2008)
- No More Idols (2011)
- Brand New Machine (2013)
- Tribe (2017)
- Rtrn II Jungle (2019)
- What Came Before (2022)
- Generic Everything (2026)

== Tours ==
- Chase & Status Debut Live Tour (UK, 2009)
- Live Tour (UK Spring 2010, Autumn, 2010)
- No More Idols Tour (UK, Europe, North America, 2011)
- Brand New Machine Arena Tour (UK Autumn-Winter 2013)
- Live Tour (UK November 2016)
- Headline act – Royal Holloway Summer Ball (2017)
- Headline act – V Fest in Stafford (2017)
- Rtrn II Jungle Tour in advance of new album (DJ sets) (Late 2018)
- 2 Ruff Tour (UK, Europe, North America, 2023-24)

== Awards and nominations ==
Brit Awards

Year	Nominee / work	Award	Result
2012	Chase & Status	British Group	Nominated
2024	Chase & Status	Group of the year	Nominated
2024	Chase & Status	Producer of the Year	Won
2025
2025	Backbone	Song of the Year	Nominated
2025	Chase & Status	Best Dance Act	Nominated

Drum & Bass Awards;Drum & Bass Awards

Year	Nominee / work	Award	Result
2019	RETREAT	Best Editor	Nominated
2022	WHEN IT RAINS	Best Narrative	Nominated

Drum & Bass Awards

Year	Nominee / work	Award	Result
2008	Chase & Status	Best Producer	Nominated
2008	"Hurt You"	Best Track	Nominated
2009	Chase & Status	Best Producer	Won
2009	More Than Alot	Best Album	Won
2009	"Take Me Away"	Best Track	Won
2010	Chase & Status	Best Live Act	Nominated
2010	Chase & Status	Best Producer	Nominated
2010	"End Credits" (featuring Plan B)	Best Track	Nominated
2011	Chase & Status	Best Live Act	Won
2011	Chase & Status	Best Producer	Won
2017	Tribe	Best Album	Nominated
2022	What Came Before	Best Album	Won
2023	"Baddadan (ft. IRAH, Flowdan, Trigga & Takura)" (with Bou)	Best Track	Won
2023	Chase & Status	Best Producer	Won

NME Awards

Year	Nominee / work	Award	Result
2011	"Let You Go" (featuring Mali)	Best Video	Nominated

Q Awards

Year	Nominee / work	Award	Result
2010	"End Credits" (featuring Plan B)	Best Video	Won

UK Festival Awards

Year	Nominee / work	Award	Result
2010	Chase & Status (Bestival)	Critic's Choice	Nominated
2010	Chase & Status (Beach Break Live)	Headline Performance	Nominated

Virgin Media Music Awards

Year	Nominee / work	Award	Result
2010	Chase & Status	Best Newcomer	Nominated

Xtra Bass Awards

Year	Nominee / work	Award	Result
2007	"In Love" (with Jenna G)	Best Track	Won
