= Breakage =

Breakage may refer to:

- Breakage (accounting), a term used in telecommunications and accounting to indicate any type of service which is unused by the customer
- Breakage (musician), British electronic producer and DJ
- "Breakage" (Breaking Bad), an episode from season two of TV series Breaking Bad

== See also ==
- Break (disambiguation)
- Breakages, Limited, a fictional corporation in 1928 play The Apple Cart
- Breakage-fusion-bridge cycle, a mechanism of chromosomal instability
- The Breakage of the Sunflower, Iraqi novels
