= When the Night Comes =

Studio album by Breakage
- Released: 25 May 2015
- Genre: Electronica
- Label: Digital Soundboy

Professional ratings
Review scores
| Source | Rating |
|---|---|
| Clash | 6/10 |
| Mixmag | 7/10 |
| NME | 8/10 |
| Uncut | 7/10 |

When the Night Comes is an album by British producer Breakage. The album's main styles are dubstep, house, downtempo and drum & bass. It was released on 8 June 2015, on the Digital Soundboy label.

== Critical reception ==
NME called the album "UK bass music at its best."

== Track listing ==
1. "Vellocet" - 4:10
2. "Revelation" Featuring – Liam Bailey - 4:23
3. "Treading Water" Featuring – Detour City - 4:03
4. "Aquamission" - 0:48
5. "Stolen" Featuring – Lily Mckenzie - 4:11
6. "Own Worst Enemy" Featuring – Calyx - 4:33
7. "To Be Around You" - 4:09
8. "I On U" - 3:38
9. "Switchermission" - 1:17
10. "Future" Featuring – Madi Lane - 3:33
11. "Dedication" - 3:52
12. "Creepers" Featuring – Mercedes - 4:49
13. "Natty" - 3:52
14. "Bad Blood" Featuring – SLO - 5:04
