= Foundation (Breakage album) =

Studio album by Breakage
- Released: 22 March 2010
- Genre: Electronica
- Length: 1:01:02
- Label: Digital Soundboy

Professional ratings
Review scores
Source	Rating
NME	(8/10)

Foundation is an album by British producer Breakage. The album's main styles are dubstep, UK garage and drum & bass. It was released on 22 March 2010, on the Digital Soundboy label.

== Track listing ==
1. "Open Up" – 5:10
2. "Hardcore Music (Interlude)" – 0:36
3. "Hard (featuring David Rodigan & Newham Generals)" – 3:43
4. "Digiboy Radio (Interlude)" – 1:08
5. "Old Skool Ting" – 5:19
6. "Squid Bass (Interlude)" – 0:48
7. "Run 'em Out (featuring Roots Manuva)" – 4:08
8. "Temper" (featuring Kemo) – 5:27
9. "Over (featuring Zarif)" – 4:22
10. "Higher" – 5:38
11. "Foundation" – 5:12
12. "Justified (featuring Erin)" – 4:48
13. "Vial (featuring Burial)" – 3:54
14. "Speechless (featuring Donae'o)" – 4:22
15. "If (Interlude)" – 0:42
16. "If (featuring Threshold)" – 5:46
