= The Accidental (band) =

British folk band

- Origin: United Kingdom
- Genres: Folk
- Labels: Thrill Jockey Records
- Past members: Stephen Cracknell; Sam Genders; Hanna Caughlin; Liam Bailey
- Website: www.theaccidental.co.uk

The Accidental were a folk band from the United Kingdom, made up of members of The Bicycle Thieves, Tunng and The Memory Band. The band members were Stephen Cracknell of The Memory Band, Sam Genders of Tunng, Hanna Caughlin of The Bicycle Thieves and singer-songwriter Liam Bailey. Other members of The Memory Band and harpist Serafina Steer also contributed. Their debut album, There Were Wolves, was recorded in Cracknell's London apartment with a computer and a pair of microphones, and was released by Thrill Jockey Records in April 2008.

== Discography ==
=== Albums ===
- There Were Wolves (Thrill Jockey Records, 2008)
