= Jess Mills =

British singer

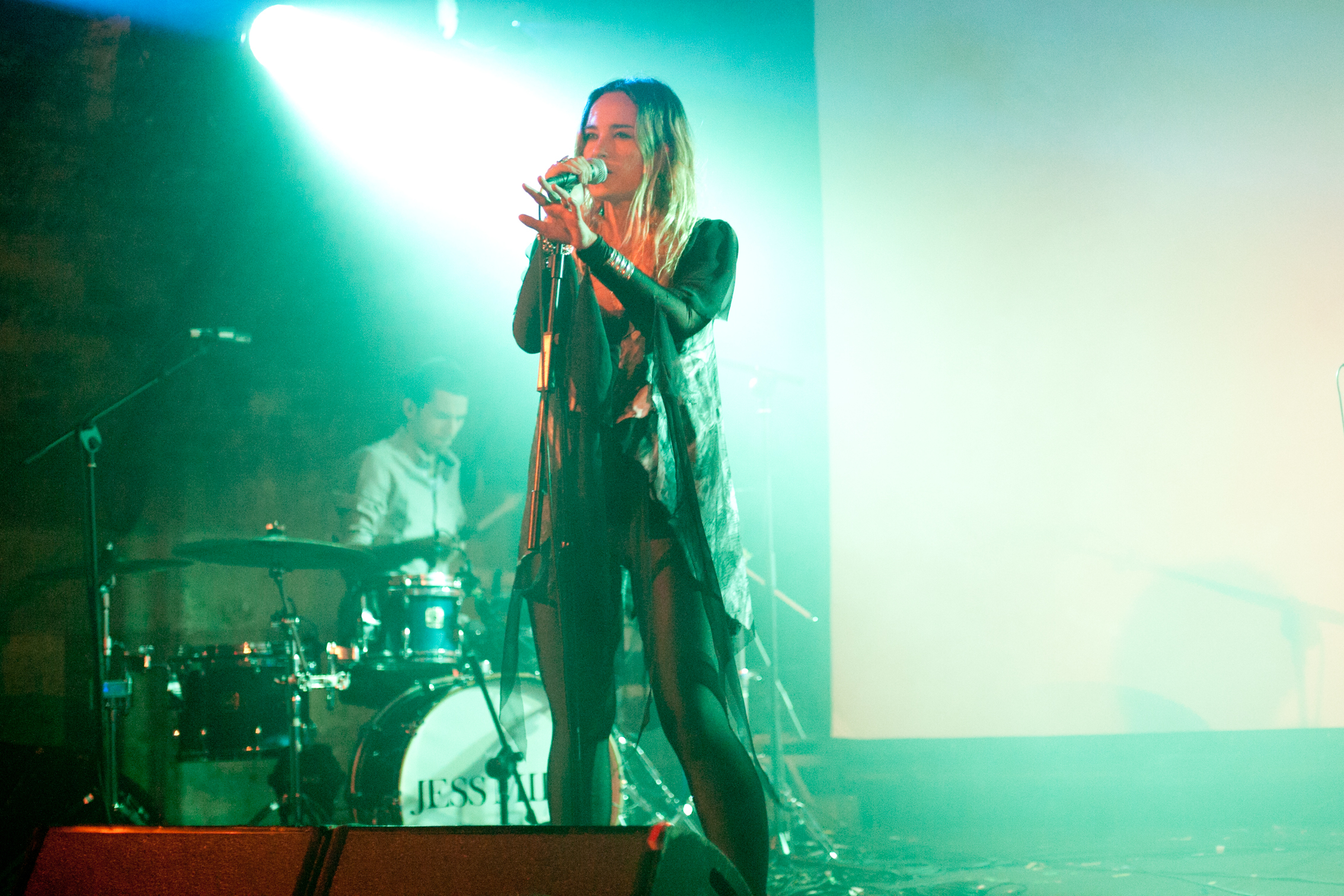
- Mills performing in 2011

Background information
- Born: Jessica Rosemary Frances Mills
- Origin: Kentish Town, London, England
- Genres: Electropop, Indietronica, dubstep, soul, trip hop
- Occupation: Singer-songwriter
- Instrument: Vocals
- Years active: 2010–present
- Label: Warner/Chappell Music
- Website: http://jessmills.co.uk

Jessica Rosemary Frances Mills is an English singer/songwriter and musician signed to Island Records who has collaborated with many UK electronic music producers including Photek, Distance, and Breakage.

== Early life and career ==
Mills grew up in Kentish Town, North London. She is the daughter of Labour Party MP Tessa Jowell and lawyer David Mills, and attended Acland Burghley School; there, she met Niomi McLean-Daley, better known as Ms. Dynamite, becoming friends and "doing dodgy dance routines in assembly together".

After graduating from Sussex University, Mills began working in a local pub to fund a continued interest in music on the side. After a steady string of collaborations with various musicians throughout the 2000s (including one with Dom Search from The Nextmen) she eventually got her real break touring with Leftfield in 2010. She has worked extensively with producer Breakage, scoring a UK top 40 hit with the track "Fighting Fire". Other tracks released in 2011 include the singles "Vultures" and "Live For What I Die For", as well as a cover of The Cure's "A Forest", of which Robert Smith himself admitted he is a fan.

Mills attracted interest from the press, including a feature to run in i-D magazine. Her debut album, Twist of Fate, was originally set to be released on 28 January 2013; due to her label's poor promotion of "For My Sins", the album was pushed back and ultimately shelved. Since her departure from Island Records, she has signed with Warner/Chappell Music. Her first release with this label is a free download of Sweet Love, an original song that incorporates lyrics from Anita Baker's song of the same name.

Mills supported Scottish singer-songwriter Emeli Sandé on her Our Version of Events Tour, after performing alongside Sandé, Annie Lennox & Katy B at an EQUALS live concert. Mills released her fourth single "For My Sins" on 14 September 2012 ahead of the release of her later-cancelled album Twist of Fate In 2015, Mills made a return under the moniker "SLO" and has since released two EP's. On 15 March 2019 she released the single 'Temporary Madness' as the first single from her debut album, Solace, released on 12 April. Mills also works for the charity Help Refugees.

== Discography ==
=== Studio albums ===
- Twist of Fate (cancelled)
- Solace (as SLO) (2019)

=== Extended plays ===
- SLO (2015)
- Atone (2016)

=== Singles ===
Year	Title	Peak chart positions	Album
Year	Title	UK	Album
2005	"Seize the Day"	—	—
2011	"Vultures"	—	Twist of Fate
2011	"Live For What I'd Die For"	—	Twist of Fate
2012	"Pixelated People"	—	Twist of Fate
2012	"For My Sins"	—	Twist of Fate
2015	"Fortune"	—	SLO
2015	"Shut Out of Paradise"	—	SLO
2019	"Temporary Madness"	—	Solace
2019	"Coals"	—	Solace

=== As featured artist ===
Year	Title	Peak chart positions	Album
Year	Title	UK	Album
2011	"Fighting Fire" (Breakage feat. Jess Mills)	34	TBA
2012	"Somebody To Love" (Jack Beats feat. Jess Mills)	–	-
2013	"Storm" (Phaeleh feat. Jess Mills)	–	Tides
