= Escheat =

State taking ownership of 'unowned' land

Escheat /ɪsˈtʃiːt/ (from Latin excidere 'fall away') is a common law doctrine that transfers the real property of a person who has died without heirs to the government, or in the United Kingdom, crown. It serves to ensure that property is not left in "limbo" without recognized ownership. It originally applied to a number of situations where a legal interest in land was destroyed by operation of law, so that the ownership of the land reverted to the immediately superior feudal lord.

== Etymology ==
The term "escheat" derives ultimately from the Latin ex-cadere, to "fall-out", via mediaeval French escheoir. The sense is of a feudal estate in land falling-out of the possession by a tenant into the possession of the lord.

"Escheat" may also, rarely, be referred to by the shortened form "cheat". The common term "cheat" for unethical or rule-breaking behavior evolved from this term.

== Origins in feudalism ==
In feudal England, escheat referred to the situation where the tenant of a fee (or "fief") died without an heir or committed a felony. In the case of such demise of a tenant-in-chief, the fee reverted to the King's demesne permanently, when it became once again a mere tenantless plot of land, but could be re-created as a fee by enfeoffment to another of the king's followers. Where the deceased had been subinfeudated by a tenant-in-chief, the fee reverted temporarily to the crown for one year and one day by right of primer seisin after which it escheated to the over-lord who had granted it to the deceased by enfeoffment. From the time of Henry III, the monarchy took particular interest in escheat as a source of revenue.

=== Background ===
At the Norman Conquest of England in 1066, all land in England was claimed as the personal possession of William the Conqueror under allodial title. The monarch thereby became the sole "owner" of all land in the kingdom, a position that persists today. William granted land to his followers, who became tenants-in-chief under various contracts of feudal land tenure. Such tenures—even the highest, that of "feudal barony"—never conferred ownership of the land itself, but only ownership of rights over it, that is, an estate in land. The holders are therefore correctly described as "landholders" or "tenants" (from the Latin teneo, "to hold") rather than owners. Holdings held freely, by freehold, were heritable by the holder's legal heir. On payment of a premium known as feudal relief to the treasury, the heir was entitled to demand re-enfeoffment by the king with the fee concerned.

Where no legal heir existed, the fief was regarded as having ceased to exist as a legal entity: being tenantless, no living person had been enfeoffed with the land, which was then held either by the Crown or by the immediate overlord as ultimus haeres. The latter applied where the fee had been subinfeudated by the tenant-in-chief to a mesne lord, possibly through a further series of mesne lords. In principle, the land fell into the occupation of the Crown alone, that is, into the royal demesne. This was the basic operation of an escheat (excadere), a failure of heirs.

Escheat could also occur if a tenant was outlawed or convicted of a felony, in which case the king could exercise the ancient right of wasting the offender's land for a year and a day, after which it reverted to the overlord. A tenant guilty of treason, rather than mere felony, forfeited all lands to the king. John and his heirs frequently insisted on seizing as terrae Normannorum ("lands of the Normans") the English lands of lords who also held in Normandy and who chose to remain Normans rather than Englishmen when the victories of Philip II of France compelled them to declare allegiance to France. Because disavowal of a feudal bond was itself a felony, lords could escheat land from tenants who refused to perform their feudal services. Other tenants were merely slow to perform their duties without being openly rebellious. Remedies in the courts against such conduct existed even in Henry de Bracton's day, but were regarded as laborious and were often ineffective in compelling performance. The most common mechanism was distraint, also known as distress (districtio), by which the lord seized the tenant's chattels or goods and held them until performance was achieved. This practice was addressed in the 1267 Statute of Marlborough, yet it remained the most common extrajudicial method used by overlords at the time of Quia Emptores.

Under English common law, escheat could therefore arise in two principal ways:

1. A person's lands escheated to the immediate overlord upon conviction for a felony, but not for treason, in which case the land was forfeited to the Crown. If the person was executed for felony, the heirs were attainted and thus ineligible to inherit. In most common law jurisdictions this form of escheat has been abolished; in the United States, for example, Article 3 § 3 of the United States Constitution provides that attainders for treason do not give rise to posthumous forfeiture, or "corruption of blood".
2. If a person left no heir to receive the lands under a will or under the laws of intestacy, any land owned at death would escheat. This rule has been replaced in most common law jurisdictions by bona vacantia or a comparable concept.

== Procedure ==
From the 12th century onward, the Crown appointed escheators to administer escheats and report to the Exchequer; by the mid-14th century, one escheator was established per county. On the death of a tenant-in-chief, the escheator received a writ of diem clausit extremum ("he has closed his last day", indicating that the tenant had died), issued by the Court of Chancery. The writ directed him to empanel a jury and hold an inquisition post mortem to determine the identity of the legal heir, if any, and the extent of the land held. These findings established whether the Crown held any rights over the land.

Identifying the heir also served other purposes. If the land was held under military tenure, the heir would become a member of the royal army, so the Crown had an interest in knowing who he was and in assessing his capabilities. Where the succession was uncertain, the escheator would seize the land and refer the matter to the king's court for resolution, a procedure that preserved the Crown's revenue during the interval. Delays in the court's proceedings were a recurring concern for landholders.

== Current operation ==
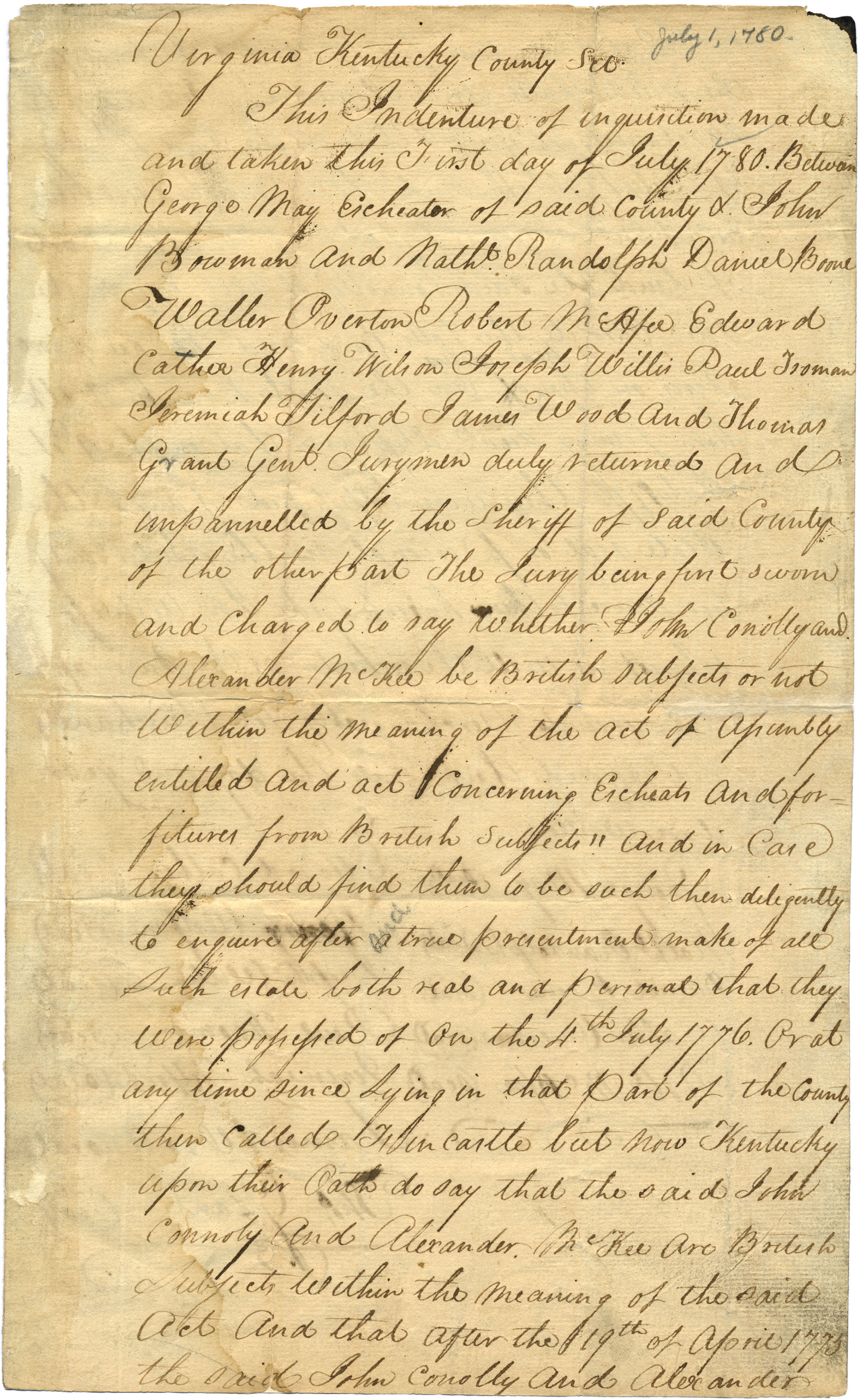
Jury finding from Kentucky County, Virginia County Court from an inquest of escheat. A twelve-man panel adjudged John Connolly and Alexander McKee to be British citizens within the meaning of the Virginia Assembly Act of 1779 concerning British subjects and their rights under Virginia law. (The Assembly had seized Connolly's claims prior to the inquest.) The jury found that the lands of Connolly and McKee were forfeited as they were British (and not American) citizens. Daniel Boone was listed as member of jury (July 1780).

Most common law jurisdictions have abolished the concept of feudal land tenure of property, and so the concept of escheat has lost something of its meaning. In England and Wales, the possibility of escheat of a deceased person's property to the feudal overlord was abolished by the Administration of Estates Act 1925; however, the concept of bona vacantia means that the Crown (or Duchy of Cornwall or Duchy of Lancaster) can still receive such property if no-one else can be found who is eligible to inherit it.

The term is often now applied to the transfer of the title to a person's property to the state when the person dies intestate without any other person capable of taking the property as heir. For example, a common law jurisdiction's intestacy statute might provide that when someone dies without a will, and is not survived by a spouse, descendants, parents, grandparents, descendants of parents, children or grandchildren of grandparents, or great-grandchildren of grandparents, then the person's estate will escheat to the state.

Similarly, under Napoleonic law, if someone dies intestate without natural heirs then, after all creditors are paid, any remaining real and personal goods are inherited by the State.

In some jurisdictions, escheat can also occur when an entity, typically a bank, credit union or other financial institution, holds money or property which appears to be unclaimed, for instance due to a lack of activity on the account by way of deposits, withdrawals or any other transactions for a lengthy time in a cash account. In many jurisdictions, if the owner cannot be located, such property can be escheated to the state.

In commerce, it is the process of reassigning legal title in unclaimed or abandoned payroll checks, insurance payouts, or stocks and shares whose owners cannot be traced, to a state authority (in the United States). A company is required to file unclaimed property reports with its state annually and, in some jurisdictions, to make a good-faith effort to find the owners of their dormant accounts. The escheating criteria are set by individual state regulations.

=== England and Wales ===
==== Bankruptcies and liquidations ====
Escheat can still occur in England and Wales when a person is declared bankrupt or a corporation is liquidated. In such cases, the property held by that person or corporation is usually vested in (transferred to) the official receiver or trustee in bankruptcy. The receiver or trustee may, however, decline to accept the property by disclaiming it.

A trustee in bankruptcy will relatively often disclaim freehold property that carries a potential liability. For example, the common parts of a block of flats owned by a bankrupt would ordinarily pass to the trustee to be realised toward paying the bankrupt's debts, but the property may impose on the landlord an obligation to spend money for the benefit of the flats' lessees. The owner's bankruptcy means the freehold is no longer the bankrupt's legal property, and the disclaimer extinguishes the freehold estate. The land then ceases to be owned by anyone and effectively escheats, becoming land held by the Crown in demesne. A few hundred properties are affected in this way each year.

Although such escheated property is owned by the Crown, it does not form part of the Crown Estate unless the Crown, acting through the Crown Estate Commissioners, "completes" the escheat by taking steps to exercise the rights of ownership. In the example above, the flats' tenants or their mortgagees would usually instead exercise their rights under the Insolvency Act 1986 to have the freehold transferred to them. This is the principal difference between escheat and bona vacantia: in the latter, the transfer occurs automatically, with no need to "complete" it.

==== Registration of Crown land ====
One consequence of the Land Registration Act 1925 was that only estates in land (freehold or leasehold) could be registered. Crown land, i.e., land held directly by the Crown – also known as property in the royal demesne – is not held under any residual feudal tenure (the Crown has no historical overlord other than, for brief periods, the papacy), and there is therefore no estate to register. This had the consequence that freeholds which escheated to the Crown ceased to be registrable. This created a slow drain of property out of registration, amounting to some hundreds of freehold titles in each year.

The problem was noted by the Law Commission in their report "Land Registration for the Twenty-First Century". The Land Registration Act 2002 was passed in response to that report. It provides that land held in demesne by the Crown may be registered.

=== United States ===
==== Transfer agents and escheatment ====
Escheatment is the process of returning lost or unclaimed property to the government of a state, for safekeeping until the owner is identified. Geographic jurisdiction of the state is determined by the last known address of the original owner. Each state has laws regulating escheatment, with holding periods typically ranging around five years. The legal principle behind escheatment is that all property has a legally recognized owner. Therefore, if the original owner cannot be found within a specified time, the government is presumed to be the owner.

Escheats are performed on a revocable basis. Thus, if property has escheated to a state but the original owner subsequently is found, escheatment is revoked and ownership of the property reverts to that original owner.

==== Lost shareholders ====
According to SEC Rule 17 CFR 240.17f-1: Transfer agents are obligated by the SEC to report to the commission (specifically to its designee, the SEC's Securities Information System) anytime a certificate is known to be lost or missing for at least two days. Transfer Agents must search for the holder's SSN or EIN utilizing an information database system, or if not available, exercise their best effort to match the holder's name and address through these systems. All transfer agents must report all lost or missing certificates/shareholders on their own annual filings.

== See also ==
- Breakage (accounting)
- Doctrine of lapse
- History of the English fiscal system
- Intestacy
- Quia Emptores
- Res nullius
- Unowned property (bona vacantia)

== Sources ==
- S. T. Gibson, "The Escheatries, 1327–1341", English Historical Review, 36(1921).
- John Bean, The Decline of English Feudalism, 1215–1540, 1968.
