= Soon Come =

Single by Shy FX featuring Liam Bailey

from the album Cornerstone
- Released: 29 July 2013
- Recorded: 2013
- Genre: Reggae
- Length: 3:05
- Label: Digital Soundboy
- Songwriter(s): Peter Tosh
- Producer(s): Shy FX

Shy FX singles chronology
"Light Up (The World)" (2012)	"Soon Come" (2013)	"Cloud 9" (2013)

Liam Bailey singles chronology
"When Will They Learn?" (2013)	"Soon Come" (2013)	"Revelation" (2015)

The first known song called "Soon Come" was written and produced by Peter Tosh in 1978.

"Soon Come" also refers to an entirely different song by English record producer Shy FX, featuring vocals from English singer Liam Bailey. It was released on 29 July 2013 through his record label Digital Soundboy. It entered the UK Singles Chart at number 55.

"Soon Come" is also the moniker used by a modern dub reggae producer known for heavy utilization of samplers, synthesizers, and his own custom-built spring reverb units. He has collaborated with members of NYC-based band The Slackers, Kingston's Equiknoxx collective, Brooklyn's Screechy Dan, Peter Ranks, Willow Wilson, and many more artists spanning roots reggae and dancehall music. He also hosts a digital radio show called "Every Spoil Is A Style" which explores Jamaican music, its influences, and offshoots, and broadcasts live every third Thursday from the Great Circles record store in Philadelphia.

== Music video ==
The music video for the Shy FX song was released onto the Digital Soundboy YouTube channel on 28 July 2013 and lasts a total length of three minutes and five seconds.

== Track listing ==
Digital download
No.	Title	Length
1.	"Soon Come"	3:05

== Chart performance ==
=== Weekly charts ===
Chart (2014)	Peak position
UK Dance (OCC)	18
UK Indie (OCC)	6
UK Singles (OCC)	55
