= Wheat of Fire =

Book by Jamal Hussein Ali

Wheat of Fire: Women During the Nights of War
- Author: Jamal Hussein Ali
- Language: Arabic
- Genre: Documentary Literature
- Publisher: Riyad Al Rayis Publishing House – Lebanon
- Publication date: 2009
- Publication place: Iraq

Wheat of Fire: Women During the Nights of War is a book by Jamal Hussein Ali, an Iraqi novelist, author and journalist. The book was first published in 2009 by Riyad Al Rayis Publishing House in Lebanon.

== Summary ==
The book highlights women's conditions in the countries that lived the war for a long period of time, affecting its social structures, thus exposing these women to another kind of war in the absence of men. Jamal Hussein Ali used his famous poetic language to influentially intensify women's conditions in Afghanistan, Chechnya, Kurdistan and Iraq, revealing all the chaos in these regions as an attempt to briefly summarize the history's lessons and its nonexistent justice. The book includes live testimonies, facts and statements captured from onsite suffering, transmitted by the writer with a style that reflects the pain that these women underwent due to oppression and tyranny, yet abiding by the principles of the journalistic report regarding its main elements.

== Reception ==
Jamal Hussein Ali won the Journalist of 2014 Award from the Arab Academy for Human Rights in the United Kingdom in 2014 for “having an exceptional ability and courage that enabled him to document the moment of abuse and trauma, destruction and loss despite the fact that he was putting his life to danger; and his ability to communicate the feelings of fear through his writings to the readers and awaken the feelings of hope in them at the same time." According to the merits of the jury's decision, Wheat of Fire – Women during the Nights of War was praised. The jury noted that Wheat of Fire – Women during the Nights of War is an investigative work and study of the conditions of women during the war, in which he covered the horrific attacks in Chechnya, Afghanistan, Kurdistan and Iraq, and reveals the ways women managed to take care of their families and protect them during the war. He also documents the courageous spirit, initiative and persistence and draws a picture of strength in confronting adversity. The jury also praised his second book in documentary literary field, The Breakage of the Sunflower: pain of a war correspondent..".
