= Baghdad's Dead =

Novel by Jamal Hussein Ali

Baghdad’s Dead
- Author: Jamal Hussein Ali
- Language: Arabic
- Publisher: 2008 1st Edition: Al Farabi Publishing House Lebanon; 2015 2nd Edition: Al Koutoubi Egypt
- Publication place: Iraq

Baghdad's Dead is a novel by Jamal Hussein Ali, an Iraqi novelist, author and journalist. The novel was first published in 2008 in Al Farabi Publishing House in Lebanon. The second edition was published in 2015 in Al Koutoubi Publishing House in Egypt.

== Synopsis ==
Baghdad’s Dead tells the story of a superman who researches the genetic modification of individuals and ethnic groups and makes predictions about their biological and social futures.

The protagonist, who remains anonymous throughout, acquires a deep knowledge of the ontology of the dead through bonding with them in the morgue while studying medicine, physics and mathematics in Moscow. He pursued these studies after escaping Iraq after the US invasion in April 2003. The novel (composed of 8 books) keeps its main subjects, in which the man folds/sets aside the first five books and devotes the last three to interpret his thoughts regarding the man who was sought after for the arduous and peculiar scientific research process through future fantasy narrative themes and schemes.

The novel follows the protagonist through the war. The narrative style combines the poetic elements with the clinical knowledge of a scientist. After leaving Iraq to pursue his studies in Moscow, the protagonist's Russian girlfriend dies and he begins a relationship with another woman who works for the Intelligence Service. She helps him escape to Iraq through Syria during the first days of occupation. He tracks his family to Basrah and Baghdad, then joins an international team that finds mass grave sites in Iraq. He convinces the manager of a Baghdad morgue to let him work as a forensic scientist. There, he helps manage the affairs of the dead bodies after he reveals his medical identity.

The superman begins receiving encrypted letters from the dead. He awaits the final lecture in which the complete formulation of the human body will be announced through anatomical hypotheses, mythological quotes, and genomic fictional maps, for a general and moral purpose that is limited to “acknowledging the right and the wrong, as well as the ability to be in control”.

== Rececption ==
Baghdad's Dead revealed a vision of post-invasion Iraq. It was considered the first novel to advance the idea of "creating" a human model out of the corpses of the victims. The novelist invested modern science including medicine, anatomy, and genomics to embrace the tragic events.

Every chapter is introduced with a series of quotes that define a poetic rhythm to the language of the dead and reveal the protagonist's deep knowledge of the ontology of the dead. Ali selected extracts from ancient and recent books to support his theories about “human truth”, deepest connotations and utmost prospects. This work required consideration of the poetic quality of death, research into the characteristics of individuals and ethnic groups, and predictions about their biological and social future; it also required a knowledge of the philosophies of Gilgamesh, Al-Maʿarri, Dante and contemporary writers. Due to his background in science, Ali adopted the scientific style at times, combining science and literature through a narrative plot mixing reality and fiction.

== Excerpts ==
- As if he split himself into two parts: the first part being dedicated to the loved ones and the second to book the tickets for the dead, he realized that all the tricks that he evaluated scientifically and practically will bring him nothing but half a ticket, half a breeze and half a thread for the high hopes he put to face the harsh resistance of death, which embrace its residence during this time and at this place.
- If all creatures were to die once, then why was he dead over and over? And since the dreams are led by facts, thus the day he will reach its hand, he will come closer to plunge his grief and pain by embracing it with no arms, where hugs and butterflies – regardless of the ambiguity of their destiny – claim that expressing the desire bubbles is not an illusion at all times.
- For he will alter the coming moment so everyone would renew their looks, weld their ruptures and keep their welded roads. It is the last foundation of the horizon and the levelling of the obstacles and gaps, it is the bridge for the braves, the ropes for the patients, the investigation of the overabundance and the hope for humanity and its deep secret.
