= Seigniorage =

Profit from minting money

Seigniorage /ˈseɪnjərɪdʒ/, also spelled seignorage or seigneurage (from Old French seigneuriage 'right of the lord (seigneur) to mint money'), is the profit a government makes from issuing currency, which is the difference between the face value of money and the cost of producing it.

The term historically referred to a lord's right to mint coins, but today includes revenue from creating coins and banknotes, and interest earned by the central bank from its conduct of monetary policy. Seigniorage earned is equivalent to the increase in the money supply due to money creation minus the cost of producing the additional money.

Seignorage can also refer to:

- Seigniorage derived from specie (metal coins) is a tax added to the total cost of a coin (metal content and production costs) that a customer of the mint had to pay, and which was sent to the sovereign of the political region.
- Seigniorage derived from banknotes is the difference between interest earned on securities acquired in exchange for banknotes and the cost of printing and distributing the notes.

Seigniorage is the positive return, or carry, on issued notes and coins (money in circulation). Demurrage, the opposite, is the cost of holding currency.

An example of an exchange of gold for "paper" where no seigniorage occurs is when a person has one ounce of gold, trades it for a government-issued gold certificate (providing for redemption in one ounce of gold), keeps that certificate for a year, and redeems it in gold. That person began with and ends up with exactly one ounce of gold.

In another scenario, instead of issuing gold certificates a government converts gold into non-gold standard based currency at the market rate by printing paper notes. A person exchanges one ounce of gold for its value in that currency, keeps the currency for one year, and exchanges it for an amount of gold at the new market value. If the value of the currency relative to gold has changed in the interim, the second exchange will yield less (or more) than one ounce of gold (assuming that the value, or purchasing power, of one ounce of gold remains constant through the year). If the value of the currency relative to gold has decreased, the person receives less than one ounce of gold and seigniorage occurred. If the value of the currency relative to gold has increased, the person receives more than one ounce of gold and demurrage occurred; seigniorage did not occur.

== Contemporary use ==
The 50 State Quarters series of quarters (25-cent coins) began in 1999. The U.S. government thought that many people, collecting each new quarter as it rolled out of the United States Mint, would remove the coins from circulation. Each complete set of quarters (the 50 states, the five inhabited U.S. territories, and the District of Columbia) is worth $14.00. Since it costs the mint about five cents to produce one quarter, the government made a profit when someone collected a coin. The Treasury Department estimates that it earned about $6.3 billion in seigniorage from the quarters during the program.

Some countries' national mints report the amount of seigniorage provided to their governments; the Royal Canadian Mint reported that in 2006 it generated $93 million in seigniorage for the government of Canada. The U.S. government, the largest beneficiary of seigniorage, earned about $25 billion in 2000. For coins only, the U.S. Treasury received 45 cents per dollar issued in seigniorage for the 2011 fiscal year.

Occasionally, central banks have issued limited quantities of higher-value banknotes in unusual denominations for collecting; the denomination will usually coincide with an anniversary of national significance. The potential seigniorage from such printings has been limited, since the unusual denomination makes the notes more difficult to circulate and only a relatively-small number of people collect higher-value notes.

Over half of Zimbabwe's government revenue in 2008 was reportedly seigniorage. The country has experienced hyperinflation ever since, with an annualized rate of about 24,000 percent in July 2008 (prices doubling every 46 days).

== Ordinary seigniorage ==
Ordinarily, seigniorage is an interest-free loan (of gold, for example) to the issuer of the coin or banknote. When the currency is worn out the issuer buys it back at face value, balancing the revenue received when it was put into circulation without any additional amount for the interest value of what the issuer received.

Historically, seigniorage was the profit resulting from producing coins. Silver and gold were mixed with base metals to make durable coins. The British pound sterling was 92.5 percent silver; the base metal added (and the pure silver retained by the government mint) was, less costs, the profit – the seigniorage. Before 1933, United States gold coins were 90 percent gold and 10 percent copper. To make up for the lack of gold, the coins were over-weighted. A one-ounce Gold American Eagle will have as much of the alloy as needed to contain a total of one ounce of gold (which will be over one ounce). Seigniorage is earned by selling the coins above the melt value in exchange for guaranteeing the weight of the coin.

Under the rules governing the monetary operations of major central banks (including the United States Federal Reserve), seigniorage on banknotes is the interest payments received by central banks on the total amount of currency issued. This usually takes the form of interest payments on treasury bonds purchased by central banks, putting more money into circulation. If the currency is collected, or is otherwise taken permanently out of circulation, the currency is never returned to the central bank; the issuer of the currency keeps the seigniorage profit by not having to buy back worn-out currency at face value.

== Solvency constraints of central banks ==
The solvency constraint of a standard central bank requires that the present discounted value of its net non-monetary liabilities (separate from monetary liabilities accrued through seigniorage attempts) be zero or negative in the long run. Its monetary liabilities are liabilities in name only, since they are irredeemable. The holder of base money cannot insist on the redemption of a given amount into anything other than the same amount of itself, unless the holder of the base money is another central bank reclaiming the value of its original interest-free loan.

== International circulation ==
The international circulation of banknotes is a profitable form of seigniorage. Although the cost of printing banknotes is minimal, the foreign entity must provide goods and services at the note's face value. The banknote is retained as a store of value, since the entity values it more than the local currency. Foreign circulation generally involves large-value banknotes, and can be used for private transactions (some of which are illegal).

American currency has been circulating globally for most of the 20th century, and the amount of currency in circulation increased several-fold during World War II. Large-scale printing of the United States one-hundred-dollar bill began when the Soviet Union dissolved in 1991; production quadrupled, with the first trillion-dollar printing of the bill. At the end of 2008, U.S. currency in public circulation amounted to $824 billion and 76 percent of the currency supply was in the form of $100 bills (twenty $100 bills per U.S. citizen). The amount of U.S. currency circulating abroad is controversial. According to Porter and Judson, 53 to 67 percent was overseas during the mid-1990s. Feige estimates that about 40 percent is abroad. In a New York Federal Reserve publication, Goldberg writes that "about 65 percent ($580 billion) of all banknotes are in circulation outside of the country". These figures are largely contradicted by Federal Reserve Board of Governors Flow of Funds statistics, which indicate that $313 billion (36.7 percent) of U.S. currency was held abroad at the end of March 2009. Feige calculates that since 1964, "the cumulative seigniorage earnings accruing to the U.S. by virtue of the currency held by foreigners amounted to $167–$185 billion and over the past two decades seigniorage revenues from foreigners have averaged $6–$7 billion dollars per year".

The American $100 bill has competition from the €500 note, which facilitates the transport of larger amounts of money. One million dollars in $100 bills weighs 22 pounds (10 kg), and it is difficult to carry this much money without a briefcase and physical security. The same amount in €500 notes would weigh less than three pounds (1.4 kg), which could be dispersed in clothing and luggage without attracting attention or alerting security devices. In illegal operations, transporting currency is logistically more difficult than transporting cocaine because of its size and weight, and the ease of transporting its banknotes makes the euro attractive to Latin American drug cartels.

The Swiss 1,000-franc note, worth slightly more than $1,000, is probably the only other banknote in circulation outside its home country. However, it does not have a significant advantage over the €500 note to the non-Swiss; there are 20 times as many €500 notes in circulation, and they are more widely recognized. As a reserve currency, it makes up about 0.1% of the currency composition of official foreign-exchange reserves.

Governments vary in their issuance of large banknotes; in August 2009, the number of Fr. 1,000 notes in circulation was over three times the population of Switzerland. For comparison, the number of circulating £50 banknotes is slightly less than three times the population of the United Kingdom; the Fr. 1,000 franc note is worth about £600. The British government has been wary of large banknotes since the counterfeiting Operation Bernhard during World War II, which caused the Bank of England to withdraw all notes larger than £5 from circulation. The bank did not reintroduce other denominations until the early 1960s (£10), 1970 (£20) and March 20, 1981 (£50).

== See also ==
- Breakage
- Crowding out (economics)
- Currency substitution
- Debt crisis
- Fractional reserve banking
- Full reserve banking
- Gold certificate
- Hyperinflation in Zimbabwe
- Inflation hedge
- Inflationism
- Monetarism
- Money
- Quantitative easing
- Silver certificate
