= Original Nuttah =

Single by UK Apache with Shy FX
- Released: 1994
- Genre: Jungle
- Label: SOUR
- Composer: Shy FX
- Lyricist: UK Apache
- Producer: Shy FX

"Original Nuttah" is a 1994 jungle song that was produced by Shy FX with lyrics and vocals by UK Apache. The track's lyrics were written by UK Apache in the late 1980s and were dubbed over a Shy FX track titled "Gangsta Kid". After receiving approval from his peers for his version, UK Apache contacted producer Shy FX and the head of Sour Records to record an official version. The track is one of the earliest in the genre to become a top 40 chart hit in the United Kingdom. In 2022, Rolling Stone included "Original Nuttah" in their list of the "200 Greatest Dance Songs of All Time".

== Production and music ==
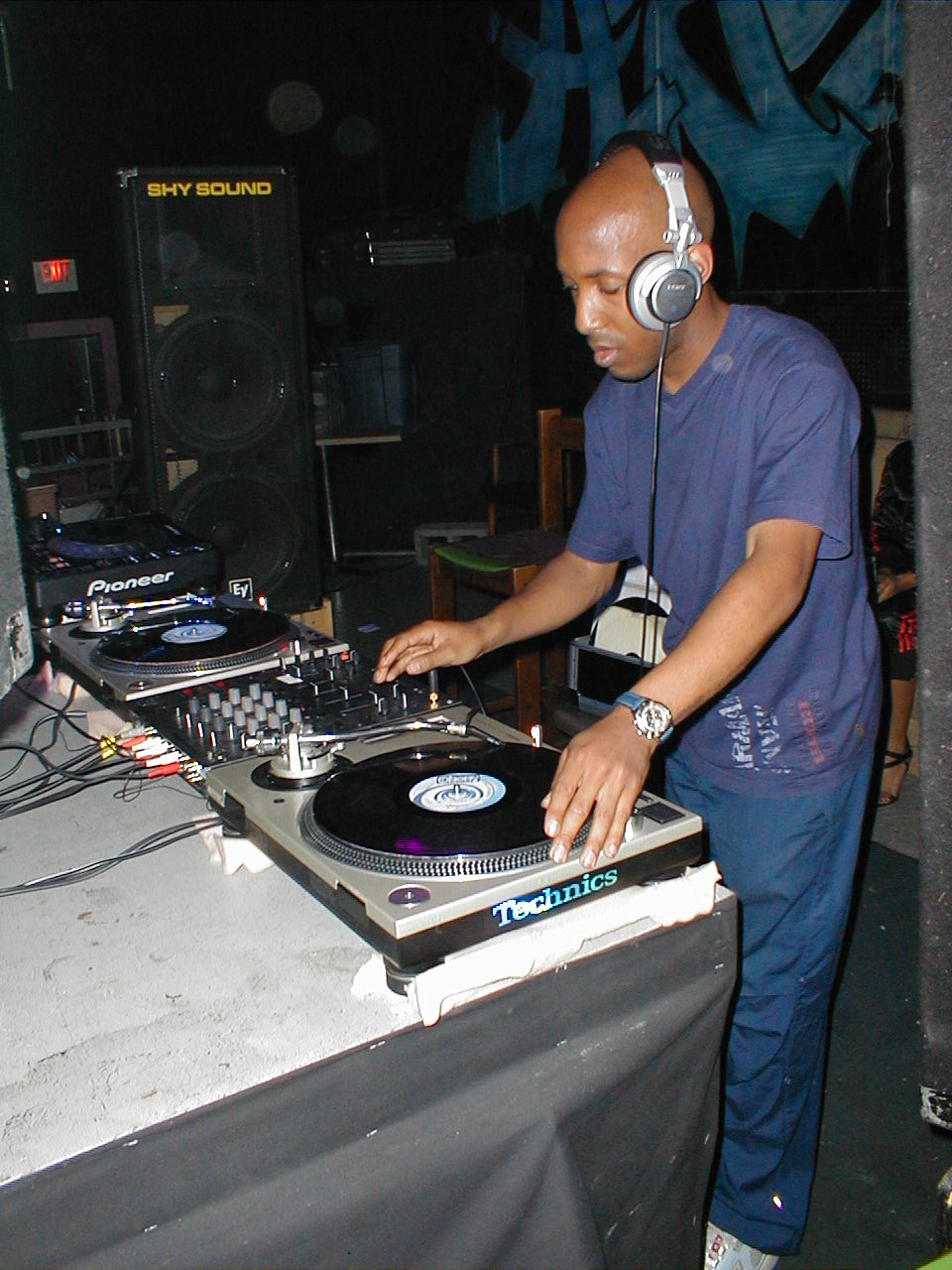
Shy FX, "Original Nuttah" producer, in 2004.

Abdul Wahab, better known as UK Apache, was born and raised in London to a Muslim family with an Iraqi father and Indian South African mother. Growing up, he was accepted by London's black community, where Jamaicans introduced him to dub music, sound system and roots reggae music, which led him to develop a local sound system crew. He described his entry into the scene as him loving "the Jamaican culture, and I would walk and talk like a Jamaican, but I was a Ja-fake-an!" He originally used the stage name Apache Indian, but after the reggae artist Apache Indian became popular, he changed his stage name to UK Apache.

UK Apache said the song's lyrics are based on films he watched while growing up, such as The Terminator and Star Wars. According to Cary Darling of The Salt Lake Tribune, who'd comment on jungle tracks in 1995, "Original Nuttah" is the track with the "most overt reggae influence".

In the early 1990s, jungle tracks were produced primarily through sampling and did not have full vocals. UK Apache was living with singers David Boomah and Sam, who introduced him to the Shy FX track "Gangsta Kid". UK Apache began singing parts of "Original Nuttah", whose lyrics were written "about six year earlier", between the gaps. After hearing his friend Juxci praise his work over the track, UK Apache contacted Dave Stone, who ran SOUR Records, and Shy FX, both of whom wanted to try something new. They booked a studio in Victoria, leading to UK Apache recording something new that was not released. The next track was UK Apache vocalizing over "Gangsta Kid", which led to "Original Nuttah". The recording was completed in two takes. UK Apache left after the track was recorded and dubplates of it were sent to DJs.

== Release ==
Prior to Original Nuttah's release, arguments about the way it should be released ensued. UK Apache stated:

Jungle producers had the artist credit because it was their music, but I came from reggae where the singer was the artist that got credited for the tune, so I wanted it to come out as 'Original Nuttah' by UK Apache. It was a tune I had written about myself, and I wanted it for my album.

An album from UK Apache never materialized, leading Shy FX to release it on his own; according to UK Apache, "Shy carried on and put Nuttah on his album ... it ended up looking more like it was his tune than mine, and I’d just done the vocals and vanished". The track was first performed live in 1994.

UK Apache stated:

My manager at the time wasn’t the best person and made me sign a deal with no representation. I didn't know about the business, and I trusted him, so he ended up acting as the manager, label, and publisher. He had the rights to the lot, where obviously he should’ve just got a percentage.

Shy FX was signed to SOUR, who wanted some money from the album, which led to the record having both SOSl Recordings and SOUR's logo on the label art. The track was released in 1994 and was a hit song in the United Kingdom. The Montreal Gazette reported sales of "Original Nuttah" in Europe topped one million by the end of 1994. It was Shy FX's first chart hit and one of the first hit songs of the genre.

A music video for "Original Nuttah" was filmed in Kings Cross in one day; Kiss FM put out a call for people to attend the video shoot. UK Apache said the video "should've been better really, but they made it quickly just so they had something to put on there. One TV show wouldn't play it because we had rain on the lens."

== Reception ==
In 1995, British newspaper The Independent included "Original Nuttah" alongside Neil Young's Sleeps with Angels and Rheostatics' Introducing Happiness in their list of "Five Best Discs of the Moment".

From retrospective reviews, Paul Terzulli of Wax Poetics commented on the song in the magazine's overview of drum & bass music, stating the track is "As infectious as M-Beat's 'Incredible' but with more energy and a streetwise edge to it" and that "the combination of the Goodfellas sample and horns on the intro leading into Shy FX’s rapid-fire breakbeats and Apache's infectious dancehall chat made for an undisputed classic".

In 2022, Rolling Stone ranked "Original Nuttah" number 146 in their list of the "200 Greatest Dance Songs of All Time".

== Track listing ==
Track list adapted from Sour Records release (SOUR 008) vinyl version.

1. "Original Nuttah (Bass Intro)"
2. "Original Nuttah (Drum Intro)"

== Certifications ==
Certifications for "Original Nuttah"
Region	Certification	Certified units/sales
United Kingdom (BPI)	Silver	200,000^{‡}
^{‡} Sales+streaming figures based on certification alone.
