= Liam Bailey =

English singer-songwriter

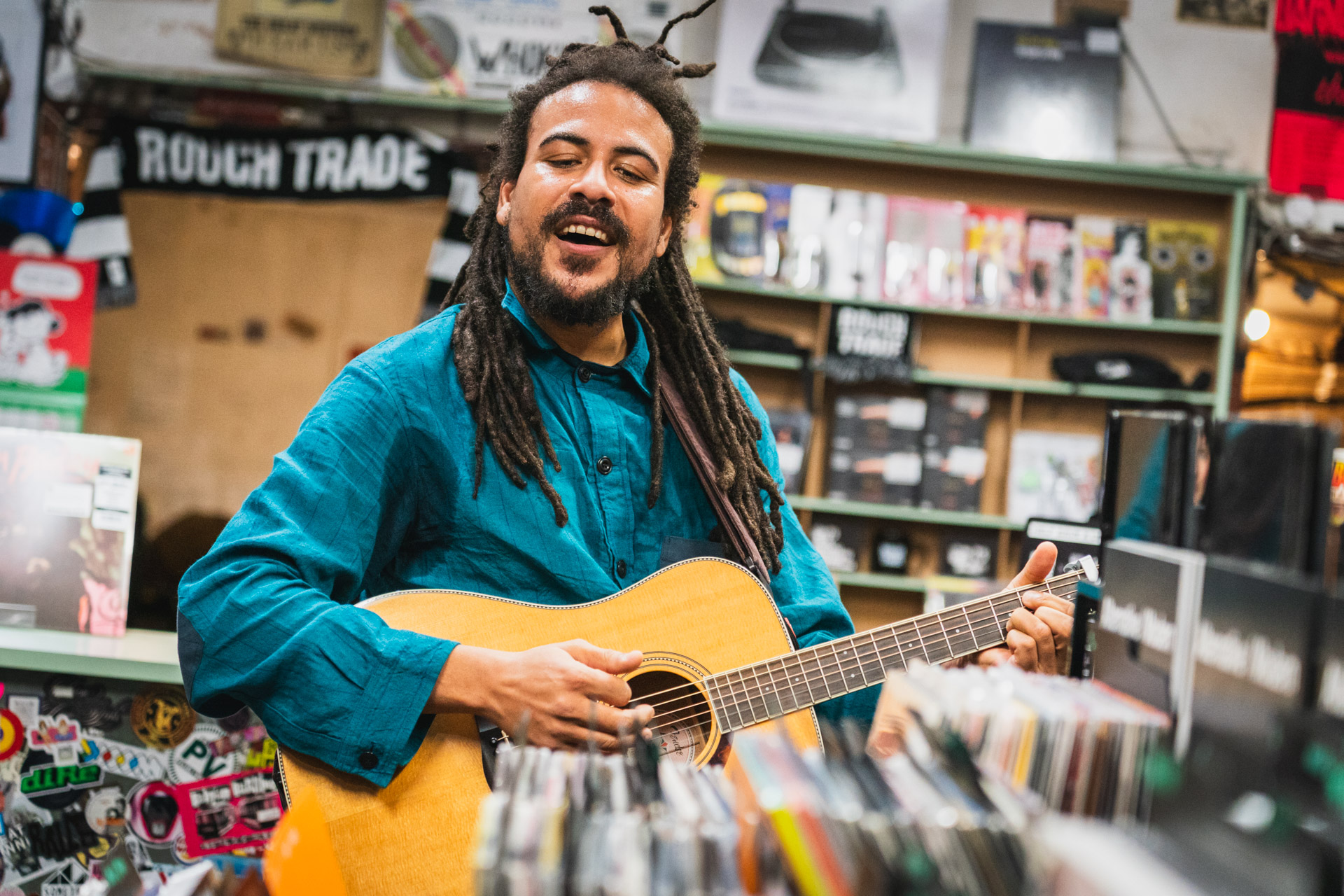
- Bailey performing in 2024

Background information
- Born: Nottingham, England
- Genres: Soul; reggae; blues; rock
- Instruments: Guitar; vocals
- Labels: Flying Buddha; Sony; Lioness; Polydor; Truth and Soul; Speakerbox
- Formerly of: The Accidental
- Website: liambaileymusic.bandcamp.com

Liam Bailey is an English singer-songwriter from Nottingham. He is noted for his soul, reggae, and blues-influenced vocal style.

== Career ==
In 2010, he released two solo EPs on Amy Winehouse's Lioness Records. Recorded entirely by Bailey and his guitar, the debut EP 2am Rough Tracks was released on 23 September, following its recording some weeks before. The EP consisted of "Your Heart's Not Safe", "I'd Rather Go Blind" and "Please, Please, Please, Let Me Get What I Want". This was followed by a second three track EP So Down, Cold, released on 29 November, featuring the tracks; "Fool Boy", "Breaking Out" and "So Down, Cold". Bailey signed to Polydor Records earlier the same year.

Bailey has been performing around the world with Chase & Status since 2010. Bailey co-wrote and performed on their single "Blind Faith", released on 21 January 2011 in the UK, where it debuted at number five in the UK Singles Chart; it also featured on their second album No More Idols. They then collaborated on the single "Big Man", released 16 October 2012, which reached No. 13 on the UK Dance Chart and appears on some editions of follow-up album Brand New Machine.

Bailey's prospective debut album Out of the Shadows was recorded, produced by Salaam Remi, and scheduled for issue in September 2011 but Bailey unexpectedly pulled the release.

Following the break with Polydor, 2013 saw the re-release of "When Will They Learn" on Speakerbox, MistaJam's Ministry of Sound imprint, complete with remixes by Shadow Child and others. The video was shot with Bailey's friends in Nottingham for the relatively small sum of £1,750. Manager Sarah Stennett told HitQuarters that its homegrown, low-key nature was a perfect fit saying: "The video with Liam is amazing because his friends capture him so well. He was signed to a major label previously and they never quite captured it."

Bailey's collaboration with Shy FX, "Soon Come" reached No. 6 on the UK Indie Chart in August 2013 and received praise from David Rodigan, Zane Lowe, and Annie Mac. They also collaborated on an EP as "Project Maldonado", which was released for download on SoundCloud.

His debut album Definitely Now was released in the US in August 2014 on Flying Buddha/Sony, with download single "On My Mind" available with pre-order. In an interview with Wondering Sound, Bailey explains how "it's been torture trying to figure out which way to go" in terms of musical direction. Definitely Now shows that he has now found his sound, and is described by Wondering Sound as "sweet Daptone soul infused with blues moods, Oasis riffage, Sam Cooke grooves and light Jamaican accents".

Nine years after first working together on The Dynamic Set's "When Will They Learn" single, Liam Bailey and Big Crown boss Leon Michels recorded an album together. Ekundayo builds on the Nottingham singer-songwriter's penchant for recording lo-fi soul. Nevertheless, AllMusic describe the 13 track collection as 'reggae'.

Bailey's fourth studio album, Zero Grace, was released in February 2024, produced by Leon Michels and the El Michels Affair collective.

== Discography ==
=== Studio albums ===
Title	Details
Definitely Now	Released: 19 August 2014; Label: Flying Buddha/Sony Masterworks; Formats: Digital download, CD
Ekundayo	Released: 13 November 2020; Label: Big Crown Records; Formats: Digital download, Vinyl
Enfant Terrible (with St Francis Hotel)	Released: 17 November 2023; Label: Self Released; Formats: Digital download, Vinyl
Zero Grace	Released: 23 February 2024; Label: Big Crown Records; Formats: Vinyl, CD

=== EPs ===
Title	Details
2am Rough Tracks	Released: 23 September 2010; Label: Lioness Records; Formats: Digital download
So Down, Cold	Released: 29 November 2010; Label: Lioness Records; Format: Digital download
It's Not the Same	Released: 3 July 2011; Label: Polydor Records; Formats: Digital download, CD
Brand New	Released: 8 February 2019; Label: Access Records; Formats: Digital download
Broken Home (with Dogger & Mindstate)	Released: 22 March 2019; Label: 1985 Music; Formats: Digital download

=== Singles ===
==== As lead artist ====
Year	Single	Album
2010	"I Belong" ^{[A]}	Non-album single
2011	"You Better Leave Me"	Non-album single
2011	"It's Not the Same"	It's Not the Same
2013	"When Will They Learn"	Non-album single
2014	"On My Mind"	Definitely Now
2014	"Villain" (featuring A$AP Ferg)	Definitely Now
2014	"Please Love Me"	Non-album single
2016	"Love My Neighbours"	Non-album single
2018	"Brother, Why You Gotta Love Her" (featuring Maverick Sabre)	Brand New
2018	"You Saw the Devil in Me"	Brand New
2018	"Tonight I'll Be Staying Here with You"	Non-album single
2019	"Broken Home" (with Dogger & Mindstate)	Broken Home
2019	"Champion"	Ekundayo
2020	"Fight"	Ekundayo
2020	"Don't Blame NY"	Ekundayo
2020	"You Saw the Devil in Me (Remix)" (with Dogger, Mindstate & DRS)	The Time is Yours
2020	"White Light"	Ekundayo
2020	"Angel Dust"	Ekundayo
2021	"Give Me Time"	Big Crown Records presents Dear Sunny...
2021	"Awkward (Take 2)" (with El Michels Affair)	Ekundayo Inversions
2021	"Walk With Me" (with El Michels Affair)	Ekundayo Inversions
2021	"I Love NY" (with El Michels Affair)	Ekundayo Inversions
2022	"Come Around Slowly" (with Shy FX)	Non-album single
2023	"Divine Light" (with St Francis Hotel)	Enfant Terrible
2023	"Recovery Time" (with St Francis Hotel)	Enfant Terrible
2023	"Heavysoul" (with IZCO and FELIXCW)	Non-album single
2023	"Bliss" (with Fybe:One)	This Is Ours
2023	"Rain" (with Zefer)	Before It Gets Too Late
2023	"Good People" (with St Francis Hotel)	Enfant Terrible
2023	"Water Your Time (Bag Uh Reasons)" (with Summer-Pearl)	OutMySystem
2023	"We're Not Clear" (with NARX)	Underwater
2024	"Stand Alone" (with Blundetto)	Heavy Soul
2025	"Dance Affi Nice / Juicy Bubble" (with SlickNBobby)	Non-album single
2025	"Gather Around (Good Times)" (with Dizzee Rascal, Bou and Shapes)	Non-album single
2026	"Gold"	Shadow Town
2026	"A Perfect Release"	Shadow Town

Notes

- ^{A} – The track was released as a free download from his website.

==== As featured artist ====
Year	Single	Peak chart positions			Album
Year	Single	UK	UK Dance	DEN	Album
2011	"Blind Faith" (Chase & Status featuring Liam Bailey)	5	1	24	No More Idols
2012	"Breathe" (Delilah featuring Liam Bailey)	87	—	—	
2012	"Big Man" (Chase & Status featuring Liam Bailey)	68	—	—	Brand New Machine
2012	"Don't Tell Me" (DJ Fresh featuring Liam Bailey)	—	—	—	Nextlevelism
2013	"Soon Come" (Shy FX featuring Liam Bailey)	55	18	—	Cornerstone
2015	"Revelation" (Breakage featuring Liam Bailey)	—	—	—	When the Night Comes
2016	"4am Where Are You" (Kumarachi featuring Liam Bailey)	—	—	—	Flashback
2020	"Yesterday" (Friction featuring Liam Bailey)	—	—	—	Non-album singles
2020	"Make No Sound" (Brookes Brothers featuring Liam Bailey)	—	—	—	Non-album singles
2020	"Lost & Proud" (Alix Perez featuring Liam Bailey)	—	—	—	Without End
2022	"Look 4" (Brighter Days Family featuring Liam Bailey)	—	—	—	Non-album single
2023	"Gunshot Love" (Break featuring Liam Bailey)	—	—	—	Digital World
2023	"Rivers" (Think Tonk vs. DJ Fresh featuring Jamie McCool and Liam Bailey)	—	—	—	Non-album single
2023	"Satisfy My Soul" (Halogenix featuring Liam Bailey)	—	—	—	Passions
2023	"Enough" (Manudigital featuring Liam Bailey)	—	—	—	Step Up
2023	"No Fear" (V V Brown featuring Liam Bailey)	—	—	—	Am I British Yet?
2023	"No Sunset For Soul" (Monty featuring Liam Bailey)	—	—	—	So Sunset For Soul
2024	"Gone For the Night" (Disrupta and Rudimental featuring Liam Bailey, BackRoad Gee, Scrufizzer and Shakes)	—	—	—	Rudim3ntal (Deluxe Edition)
2024	"Sorrow" (Joe Armon-Jones featuring Liam Bailey)	—	—	—	Aquarii In Dub
2025	"Hard Times" (Dogger and Dub Phizix featuring Liam Bailey)	—	—	—	Non-album single
2025	"Mbappé" (Sudley featuring Liam Bailey)	—	—	—	Non-album single
2025	"Let the Sun Shine" (Joliffe featuring Liam Bailey)	—	—	—	Offshore

==== Other appearances ====
Year	Song	Artist	Album
2018	"I Belong"	Salaam Remi	One: In the Chamber
2018	"Dancing with the Devil"	Roxanne Tataei	Full Moon in Aries
2019	"Lay You Down"	Foreign Beggars	Matriarchy
2019	"Actualize"	Louis Cypher	Cypher Sore Eyes
2019	"For This"	Friction	15 Years of Shogun Audio
2020	"Been Away"	Juga-Naut	Bem
2020	"The Time is Yours"	Dogger & Mindstate	The Time is Yours
2020	"Holding Back"	Dogger, Mindstate, DRS	The Time is Yours
2020	"Moving On"	Alix Perez	Without End
2021	"Lord's Prayer"	Dimension	Organ
2022	"Living Hard"	Juga-Naut	Time & Place
2022	"Don't Even Try It"	DJ Yoda	Prom Nite
2022	"Not Today"	Matata	Super Morio
2023	"Gotta Believe"	Break	Digital World
2023	"Don't Let Go"	Fybe:One	This Is Ours
2023	"What Have I Done"	Fybe:One	This Is Ours
2024	"More Time"	Crate Classics	Green Lanes
2024	"Hurt Each Other"	BCee	These Are the Days
2025	"Confidence"	Rudimental, Riko Dan, Eva Lazarus	Rudim3ntal
2025	"Where Do We Go"	Rudimental, Eva Lazarus, Dr Meaker	Rudim3ntal
2025	"Desire"	Nightmares on Wax, Haile Supreme	Echo45 Sound System
2025	"Echo45"	Nightmares on Wax	Echo45 Sound System
2025	"Mumzie Cut"	Nightmares on Wax	Echo45 Sound System
2025	"Hop-to-Mystic"	Nightmares on Wax	Echo45 Sound System
2026	"Flood the Zone"	Sleaford Mods	The Demise of Planet X
2026	"Tek Control"	Izco	Powerscroft
