= Tides (Phaeleh album) =

Studio album by Phaeleh
- Released: 1 July 2013
- Genre: Chillstep, dubstep, future garage
- Label: AFTERGLO

Phaeleh chronology
The Cold In You (2011)	Tides (2013)

Professional ratings
Aggregate scores
Source	Rating
Metacritic	57/100
Review scores
Source	Rating
MusicOMH	3.5/5 stars
NME	2/5 stars
Clash Magazine	7/10 stars
Drowned in Sound	6/10 stars

Tides is the fourth full-length studio album by English electronic musician Phaeleh. It was released in July 2013 by Afterglo Records.

== Track listing ==
No.	Title	Length
1.	"Journey"	5:02
2.	"Here Comes The Sun" (featuring Soundmouse)	4:08
3.	"Storm" (featuring Jess Mills)	5:09
4.	"Tokoi"	3:51
5.	"Whistling in the Dark" (featuring Augustus Ghost)	5:35
6.	"Tides"	1:28
7.	"Never Fade Away"	6:20
8.	"Night Lights" (featuring Cian Finn)	4:31
9.	"A Different Time"	3:07
10.	"So Far Away"	5:59
11.	"Distraction"	6:57

== Chart performance ==
Chart (2013)	Peak position
UK Dance Albums (OCC)	34
