= The Memory Band =

English folk music group

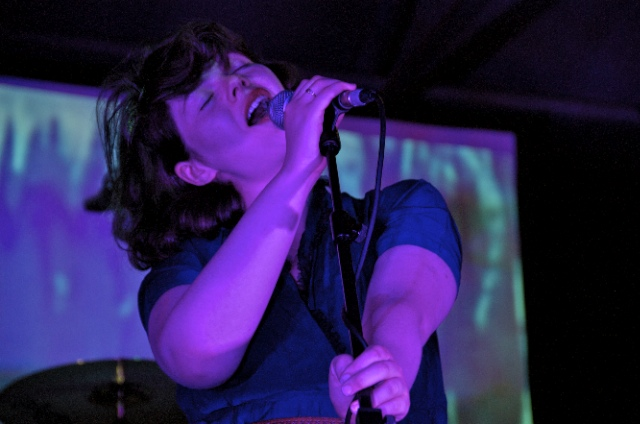
- Performing at the Supersonic Festival, 2009

Background information
- Origin: England
- Genres: Folk rock
- Years active: 2003–present
- Labels: Hungry Hill/Spinney; Peacefrog Records; Static Caravan Recordings
- Members: Stephen Cracknell; Hannah Caughlin; Jess Roberts; Tom Page; Nancy Wallace; Jennymay Logan; Rob Spriggs; Simon Lord; Rhys Morgan; Paul McGee; Adem Ilhan; Al Doyle; Emma McFarlane

The Memory Band is an English folk group founded by Stephen Cracknell. The Memory Band has a rolling cast of collaborators from across the musical spectrum. Their eponymous debut album was released on their own Hungry Hill label.

Former members of the band include Al Doyle, Adem, Simon Lord from Simian and Black Ghosts, Nancy Wallace and Lisa Knapp.

Their third album, Oh My Days, was released in 2011 and featured contributions from young soul singer Liam Bailey, Hannah Caughlin, Jess Roberts, folksinger Jenny McCormick, bass player Jon Thorne and drummer Tom Page.

The Memory Band also tour performing the music and songs from Paul Giovanni's score from the 1973 film, The Wicker Man.

== Discography ==
=== Albums ===
- The Memory Band (2004)
- Apron Strings (Peacefrog Records, 2006)
- Oh My Days (2011)
- On The Chalk (Our Navigation Of The Line Of The Downs) (2013)
- A Fair Field (2016)
- Colours (2021)
- Never the Same Way Twice (2024)

=== EPs ===
- Calling On (2003)
- Fanny Adams (2003)

=== Singles ===
- "Why"/"Come Write Me Down" (2006)
