= The Breakage of the Sunflower =

The Breakage of the Sunflower: pain of a war correspondent, diaries, Afghanistan, Chechnya, Kurdistan, Iraq
- Author: Jamal Hussein Ali
- Language: Arabic
- Genre: Documentary Literature
- Publisher: Al Ghaoun Publishing House – Lebanon 2013
- Publication date: 2013
- Publication place: Iraq

The Breakage of the Sunflower: pain of a war correspondent, diaries, Afghanistan, Chechnya, Kurdistan, Iraq is a book by Jamal Hussein Ali, an Iraqi novelist, author and journalist. The book was first published in 2013 in Al Ghaoun Publishing House in Lebanon.

Ali won the Journalist of 2014 Award from the Arab Academy for Human Rights in the United Kingdom in 2014 for “having an exceptional ability and courage that enabled him to document the moment of abuse and trauma, destruction and loss despite the fact that he was putting his life to danger; and his ability to communicate the feelings of fear through his writings to the readers and awaken the feelings of hope in them at the same time."
