= Cloud 9 (Ms. Dynamite and Shy FX song) =

Single by Ms. Dynamite and Shy FX
- Released: 20 October 2013
- Recorded: 2013
- Genre: Drum and bass; reggae
- Length: 3:55
- Label: Digital Soundboy
- Songwriter(s): Niomi McLean-Daley; Andre Williams
- Producer(s): Shy FX

Ms. Dynamite singles chronology
"Neva Soft" (2011)	"Cloud 9" (2013)	"Dibby Dibby Sound" (2014)

Shy FX singles chronology
"Soon Come" (2013)	"Cloud 9" (2013)

"Cloud 9" is a song by English singer Ms. Dynamite and English record producer Shy FX. It was released on 20 October 2013 through Shy FX's record label Digital Soundboy. The song will appear on Ms. Dynamite's forthcoming EP on the label. It entered the UK Singles Chart at number 62.

== Music video ==
The music video for the song was released onto Ms. Dynamite's YouTube channel on 7 October 2013 and lasts a total length of four minutes.

== Track listing ==
Digital download
No.	Title	Length
1.	"Cloud 9"	3:55

== Charts ==
Chart (2014)	Peak position
UK Dance (OCC)	10
UK Indie (OCC)	8
UK Singles (OCC)	62
