= Fighting Fire =

Single by Breakage featuring Jess Mills
- Released: February 27, 2011
- Length: 3:36
- Label: Digital Soundboy Recordings
- Songwriter(s): Breakage, Jess Mills

Breakage singles chronology
"Speechless" (2010)	"Fighting Fire" (2011)

Jess Mills singles chronology
"Vultures" (2011)	"Fighting Fire" (2011)	"Live for What I'd Die For" (2011)

"Fighting Fire" is a single by drum and bass/dubstep producer and DJ Breakage, featuring vocals from English singer and musician Jess Mills. It was released on 27 February 2011 as a digital download in the United Kingdom. The song peaked at number 34 on the UK Singles Chart.

== Critical reception ==
Lewis Corner of Digital Spy gave the song a positive review stating:

"What could be better than fighting fire with you?" she inquires over a combination of pumping beats and deep rhythmic bass that's got more than a whiff of the mid-1990s dance to it (Cream toilets? - Ed.). It's stylish, sure, and cool as a cucumber in the chiller cabinet at Shoreditch Tesco, but perhaps a bit too laid-back and self-assured to join its bolshier chums - hey 'I Need Air', hiya 'Lights On'! - right at the top of the charts.

== Track listing ==
Digital download
No.	Title	Length
1.	"Fighting Fire" (Original)	4:18
2.	"Fighting Fire" (Radio Edit)	3:36
3.	"Fighting Fire" (Loadstar Remix)	4:54
4.	"Fighting Fire" (Foamo Remix)	5:14

== Chart performance ==
Chart (2011)	Peak position
UK Dance (OCC)	4
UK Indie (OCC)	5
UK Singles (OCC)	34

== Release history ==
Region	Date	Format	Label
United Kingdom	February 27, 2011	Digital download	Digital Soundboy Recordings
