= Definitely Now =

2014 album by Liam Bailey

Studio album by Liam Bailey
- Released: 19 August 2014
- Length: 53:35
- Label: Flying Buddha, Sony Masterworks
- Producer: Liam Bailey (also exec.); Salaam Remi (also exec.); Fraser T. Smith; Leon Michels; The Invisible Men; Jimmy Hogarth; Dan Smith; Zane Lowe

Liam Bailey chronology
It's Not the Same (2011)	Definitely Now (2014)	Brand New (2019)

Singles from Definitely Now
- 1. "On My Mind" Released: July 30, 2014; 2. "Villain" Released: November 26, 2014

Professional ratings
Review scores
Source	Rating
AllMusic	3/5 stars
Clash	8/10
PopMatters	5/10

Definitely Now (in some cases stylised as Definitely NOW) is the debut full-length album by English singer-songwriter Liam Bailey. The album was released on 19 August 2014 by record label Sony Masterworks and Flying Buddha, and received multiple re-issues in the years following the album's release. Two singles were released from the album - the lead single "On My Mind", and a version of the originally solo track "Villain" featuring American rapper ASAP Ferg. Definitely Now was executive produced by Bailey and American record producer Salaam Remi, and includes production collaborations with musicians such as Jimmy Hogarth, Zane Lowe, and Dan Smith of the band Bastille.

== Track listing ==
Definitely Now – Standard edition
No.	Title	Writer(s)	Producer(s)	Length
1.	"On My Mind"	Bailey; Jeff Silverman; Leon Michels; Nick Movshon; Thomas Brenneck	Bailey; Salaam Remi	3:33
2.	"Breaking"	Bailey	Bailey	3:39
3.	"Fool Boy"	Bailey; Fraser T. Smith	Smith	2:51
4.	"Black Moon"	Bailey; Michels; Ben Kumar	Michels	3:21
5.	"Villain"	Bailey; Remi	Bailey; Remi	3:15
6.	"Autumn Leave"	Bailey; Adam Coney; Jon Thorne	Bailey	3:51
7.	"So...? Maybe Love"	Bailey; "Bassy" Bob Brockmann; Sharief Hobley	Bailey	5:30
8.	"Battle Hymn of Central London"	Bailey; Sam Genders	The Invisible Men	3:27
9.	"So, Down Cold"	Bailey; Tom Danvers	Michels	4:57
10.	"Crazy Situation"	Bailey	Remi	3:56
11.	"Summer Rain"	Bailey; Genders	Remi	3:06
12.	"Sail with Ease"	Bailey; Jonathan Shorten; Naville Malcome; Richie Stevens	Jimmy Hogarth	4:46
13.	"Stun Me"	Bailey; Genders	The Invisible Men; Dan Smith	3:41
14.	"Walking Out"	Bailey; Zane Lowe	Lowe	3:42
Total length:				53:35

Definitely Now – Deluxe edition (bonus tracks)
No.	Title	Writer(s)	Producer(s)	Length
15.	"I Belong (Car Park)"	Bailey; Remi	Bailey	5:10
16.	"Save Some Love"	Bailey; Hogarth	Hogarth	3:43
Total length:				1:02:28

Definitely Now – Streaming editions (bonus track)
No.	Title	Writer(s)	Producer(s)	Length
17.	"Villain" (featuring ASAP Ferg)	Bailey; Remi; Dorald Brown	Bailey; Remi	3:39
Total length:				1:06:07
