= Phaeleh =

English instrumentalist, producer and DJ

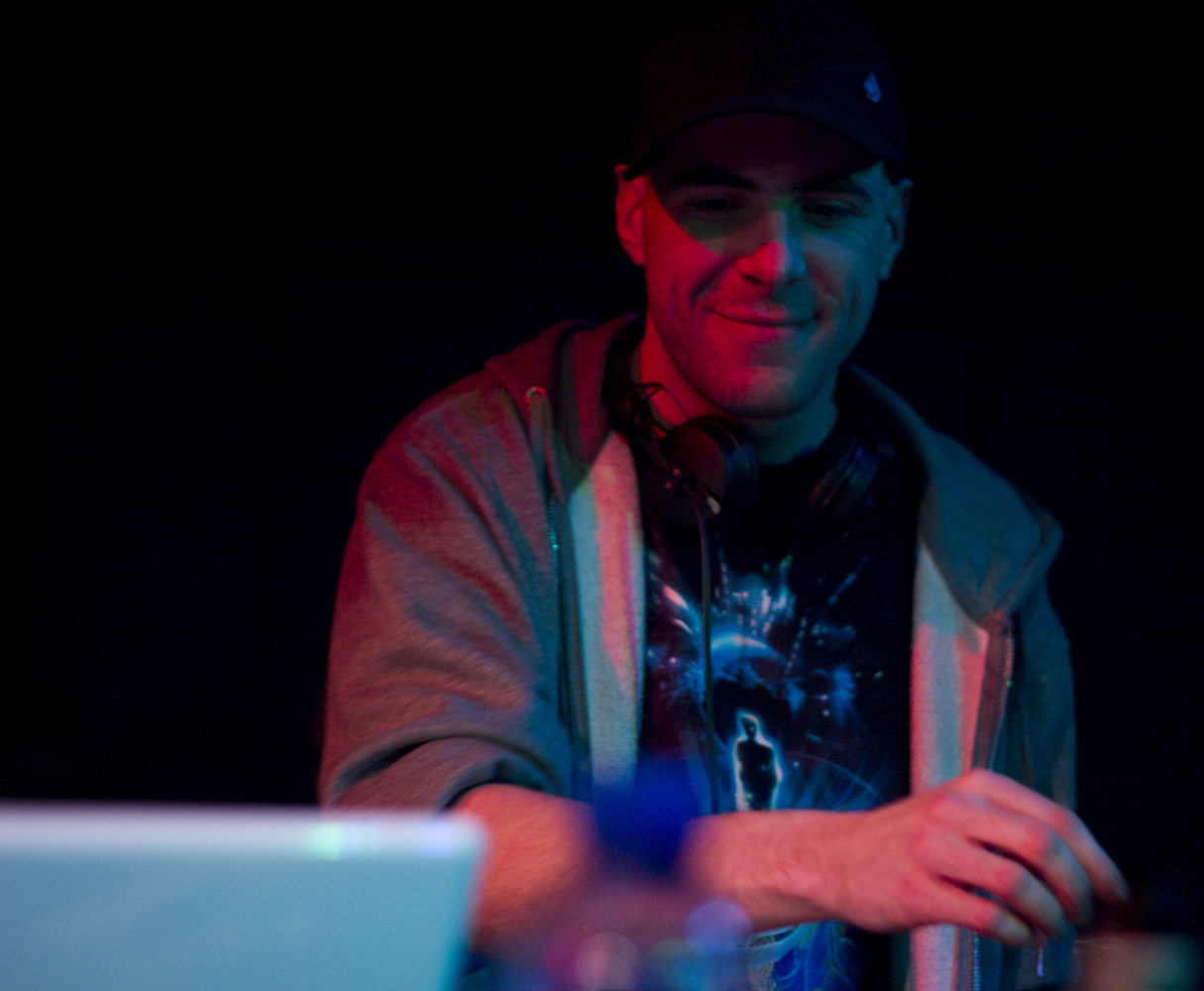
- March, 2011

Background information
- Born: Matthew Preston; Marlborough, Wiltshire, England
- Origin: Bristol, Avon, England
- Genres: Ambient, future garage, UK garage, dubstep, trip hop
- Occupation(s): Record producer, DJ
- Years active: 2008–present
- Labels: Undertow
- Website: phaeleh.co.uk

Matthew "Matt" Preston, professionally known Phaeleh (pronounced "fella") is a multi-instrumentalist, producer and DJ residing in Bristol, England. He has stated that his performing name has no specific meaning.

He produces music that could be loosely described as cinematic electronica, but his roots are in dubstep, garage and house. He describes it as "electronic bass music" with a heavy emphasis on melody and emotional content. His main inspirations are Boards of Canada, Aphex Twin, LTJ Bukem, Global Communication and Brian Eno. His compositions combine live instrumentation and electronic production.

== Discography ==
=== EPs ===
- Reflections EP (2008)
- Inside EP (2008)
- The Cold In You EP (2011)
- From the Vaults EP (2012)
- All That Remains EP (2016)

=== Singles ===
- "Lounge" (2009)
- "Fire" (2009)
- "Afterglow" (2010)
- "Untitled 333"/"Tachi" (2010)
- "Low" (2010)
- "Cheki" (2010)
- "Falling" (2011)
- "Storm" (2013)

=== Albums ===
- Within the Emptiness (2009)
- Fallen Light (2010)
- Tides (2013)
- A World Without (2014)
- Somnus (2014)
- Illusion of the Tale (2016)
- Lost Time (2017)
- Clarity (2018)
- Embers (2020)
- From The Vaults: Vol 2 (2020)
- Soma (2021)
- A New Day (2022)
