= Jamal Hussein Ali =

Iraqi novelist and journalist

Jamal Hussein Ali جمال حسين علي
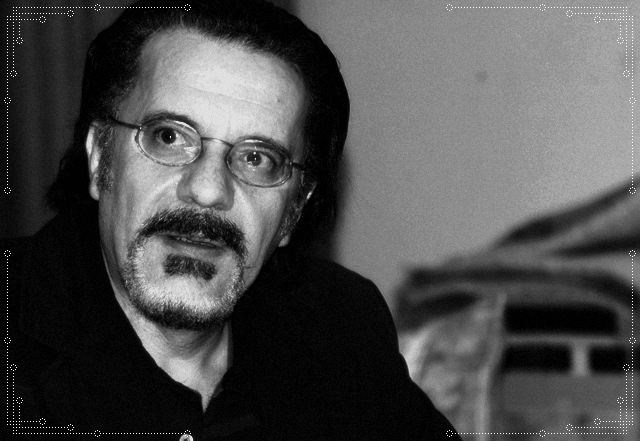
- Born: Al Basrah, Iraq
- Occupations: Novelist and journalist, professor of physics and mathematics
- Writing career
- Language: Arabic
- Notable work: Baghdad's Dead – novel
- Notable awards: Human Rights Journalist 2014, Arab Journalism Award 2005

Jamal Hussein Ali (Arabic: جمال حسين علي) is an Iraqi novelist and journalist born in Al Basrah, Iraq. He earned his doctorate (PhD) in Physics and Mathematics from Moscow State University (1993). He has published four novels, the most recent of which was Baghdad's Dead, as well as three collections of short stories and books about press release, literature and politics, both original works and translations. He has worked for several international and Arab newspapers. He has also won awards for stories, theater and journalism.

== Literary activity ==
=== Early works ===
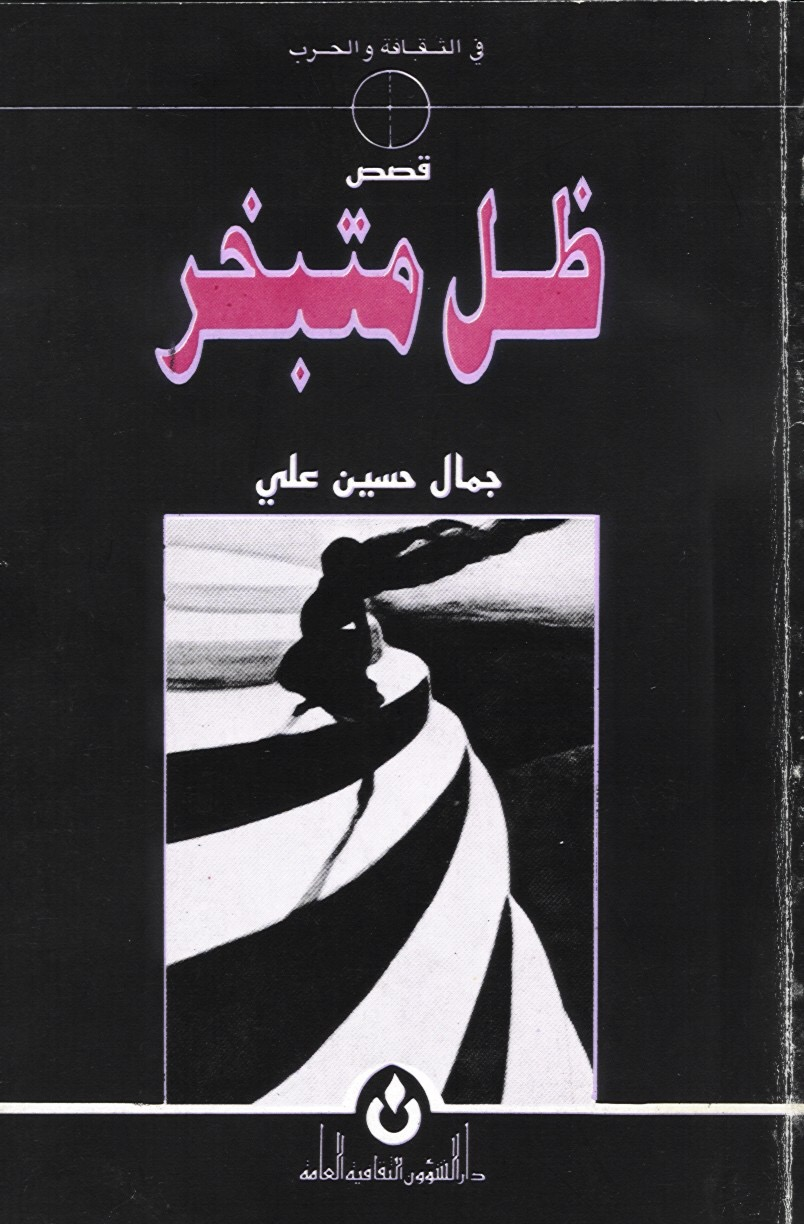
A Fading Shadow-Short Stories

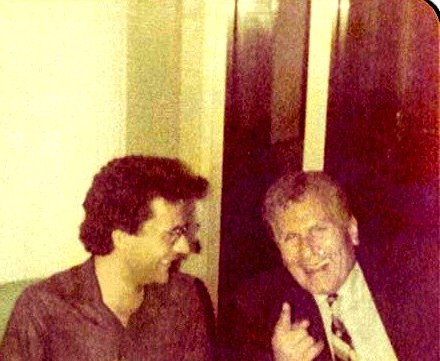
With Yusuf Idris Baghdad – 1984

Jamal Hussein Ali's first novel, A Summer at the South, was published in 1983, followed by the publication of two novels in the 1980s, Lighthouses and The Twin, in addition to three collections of short stories: A Fading Shadow, The Living Shrine and The Coronets.

=== Baghdad's Dead ===
In 2008, the writer published Baghdad's Dead, a novel about a man who returns to Iraq during war. This man (anonymous throughout the novel) acquired a deep knowledge of the ontology of the dead through bonding with them in the morgue while studying medicine in Moscow, in addition to physics and mathematics. This was reflected in the recurrence of quotes, which are used as the chapter openers of the novel, thus forming a poetic rhythm to the language of the dead engraved on their chests as a Ouija legendary board. Jamal Hussein Ali has built a strategy that roams around hundreds of notations, using extracts from ancient books and those of more recent times to support his theory about the "Human truth" in its finest forms, deepest connotations and utmost prospects. This arduous work requires consideration of the poetic quality of death, research about "the Creation – Genetic Modification" of the characteristics of individuals and ethnic groups and the prediction of their biological and social future, as well as going through Gilgamesh, Al-Maʿarri, Dante and dozens of contemporary writers.

Baghdad's Dead revealed an epic vision of the reality of the post-US invasion of Iraq through the forensic medicine morgue in the capital, where the protagonist in the novel seeks the creation of the new "Adam" out of modified genes extracted from the bodies of victims of the occupation, militias and gangs. Baghdad's Dead, published in 2008, was considered the first novel in Iraq to adapt the idea of "creating" a human model out of the corpses of the victims. The novelist invested all the data of modern science such as medicine, anatomy and genome to embrace the tragic occupation in an Iraqi novel that was considered one of the most important novels covering Iraq's history at this stage.

Jamal Hussein Ali used in this novel the literary style embracing fictional metaphors and artistic expressions revealing a passion for literature. On the other hand, and because of his academic background in science, Jamal Hussein Ali adopted the scientific style when necessary, combining science and literature through a narrative plot that mixed reality and fiction along with scientific and literary knowledge.

=== Documentary literature ===
Based on his previous job as a war correspondent, a collection of books in documentary literature by Jamal Hussein Ali was published: Wheat of Fire – Women during the Nights of War, Initiating the Needle's Hole that covers his experience during the war in Afghanistan, Hell's Awakening that covers his experience during the war in Chechnya, Flowers' Altar that covers his experience during the war in Kurdistan, Imams Lobbies/ Windows that covers his experience during the war in Iraq, The Galaxy Bloom that covers his experience in the Iraqi Marshes (Al Ahwar). In 2013, another book was published, The Breakage of the Sunflower: pain of a war correspondent, diaries, Afghanistan, Chechnya, Kurdistan, Iraq, wrapping all his experiences while covering the conflicts and wars in those regions.

In his book Wheat of Fire – Women during the Nights of War, Jamal Hussein Ali used his famous poetic language to influentially intensify women's conditions in Afghanistan, Chechnya, Kurdistan and Iraq, revealing all the chaos in these regions as an attempt to briefly summarize the history's lessons and its nonexistent justice. The book highlights women's conditions in the countries that lived the war for a long period of time, affecting its social structures, thus exposing these women to another kind of war in the absence of men. The book includes live testimonies, facts and statements captured from onsite suffering, transmitted by the writer with a style that reflects the pain that these women underwent due to oppression and tyranny, yet abiding by the principles of the journalistic report regarding its main elements.

The book includes the following chapters: The Afghan woman (How does the Afghani woman spend her day; searching for the missing body; unveiling the Afghan beauty); the Chechen woman (the other Chechen woman; the scorched-earth women); the Kurdish woman (the Kurdish woman tree); the Wheat of Fire (Wheel of Desire; Blessed love; pretty women, but preserved); the Iraqi woman (unveiled announcement for "veiled" women in the Iraqi parliament; Girls Street; the joy of beautiful and patient women; her rush to the feast to break the anger; love in Baghdad; beauty contest between Iraq and Iran; harps of war; drivers in the ways of death and chaos; the Marsh Arabs Times).

=== Sonnets ===
Two sonnets books by Jamal Hussein Ali were published: Gratis Iraq and CV CUPIDO (The Book of Love). He also published The Great Men's Letters, a book that comprises a selection of extracts and expressions quoting famous authors, novelists and storytellers from around the world. In Gratis Iraq, the author describes the miserable situation in Iraq due to the war, blockades and political corruption, using heavy expressions in short passages. These texts hold a huge grief in regarding the situation in the author’s country during the last decades. In CV CUPIDO (The Book of Love), the author talks about the résumé of love through short passages, although its preface is quite long and poetic, in addition to some short articles. The book also includes quotes to writers, artists and thinkers selected and translated by Jamal Hussein Ali. The book treats questions such as: “Why has true love become so rare?” It also discusses subjects such as farewells, jealousy, confusion, fear of love, and many other subjects through a literary combination of diverse styles.

In The Great Men's Letters, the author recalls the tradition of Arab heritage in gathering, preparing and selecting the nomad, stating "these are not extracts nor quotes, these are a complete fusion and a harmony I grasped from those who made our lives better and beautiful." The book does not include an index or arranged chapters, for this book is a parade of selected quotes with no separations. The author might intend that the reader directly examines these texts.

== Journalism ==
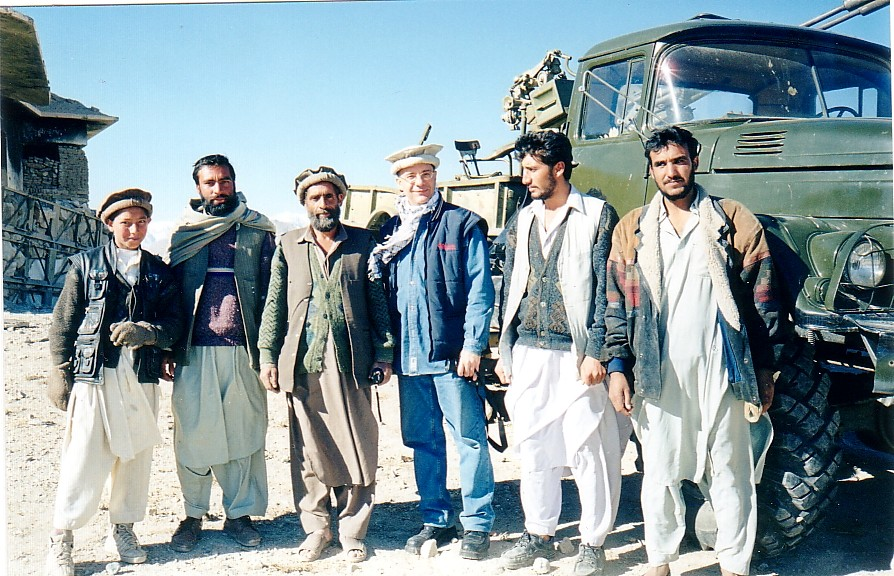
Jamal Hussein Ali – Kabul 2001

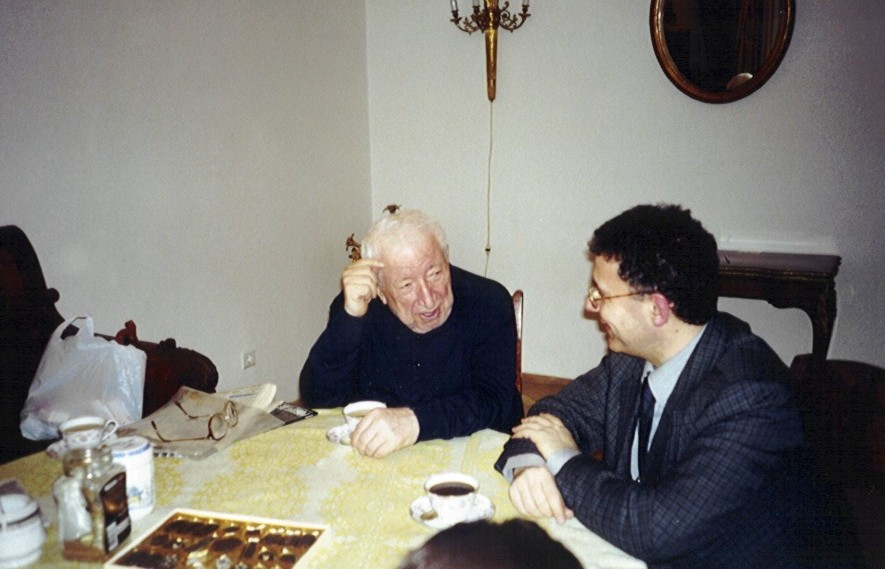
With Rasul Gamzatov Moscow – 2000

Jamal Hussein Ali is currently working for Al-Qabas, the Kuwaiti newspaper. He has worked for many Arab and international media organizations such as Moscow Times and the newspaper Al Bayan in UAE. His reports on war were also published in Al Khaleej newspaper in United Arab Emirates as well as in the London-based newspaper Al-Zaman and in some Russian newspapers. He has also worked as an analyst for the Russian affairs in Al Jazeera News Channel and an analyst for the Iraqi affairs in the Orbit Channel.

Although he studied Physics, Jamal Hussein Ali's early interest in journalism was attributed to its correlation with literature. He points out that this literary-scientific blend has paved his path in journalism, in which he became famous as a war correspondent.

Jamal Hussein Ali covered the Iran–Iraq War, the wars among Soviet republics, and the wars in Chechnya, Afghanistan, Bosnia, Kurdistan, Darfur, Iraq and Lebanon. In addition to the hundreds of investigative journalism published, he issued a series of books about documentary literature related to the areas of conflict he had visited. Jamal Hussein Ali considers, the war correspondent as the warning device that announces disasters settled by advertising agencies but wasted by distant wars through additional scandalous reports. He states that we should not be writing about cities, especially enraged ones, based on our passion or hate towards them, but based on what is worth to be added to the timeline, the future memories and the generations' lesson.

Jamal Hussein Ali perceives the photo/ image as a large professional and documentary value within the press reportage, thinking that it challenges and overcomes the written text, guarantees the provision of the subject and treating it based on wider angles, and expands the reader's perspectives leading him to the heart of the subject.

Jamal Hussein Ali has published many articles and research studies that covered political affairs in Iraq, Russia and Iran. He has also recorded many interviews with Iraqi politicians such as Jalal Talbani and Massoud Barzani.

He has also published several articles and studies in cinema, literature, science and technology. For example, he published in 2011 a series of research articles addressing the cultural change after the collapse of totalitarian regimes in Romania, Poland, Czech Republic and Russia.

== Academic work ==
Jamal Hussein Ali has worked as a lecturer in physics at Basra University before joining the University of Moscow to pursue his master's degree and doctorate in nuclear physics. Once he graduated, he worked as a professor of physics at the same university until 2003.

== Awards ==
=== Journalist of 2014 Award ===
Jamal Hussein Ali won the Journalist of 2014 Award from the Arab Academy for Human Rights in the United Kingdom in 2014. This awards honors the work of the reporters and media workers and writers, to devote freedom of expression and defend human rights in order to mark out their efforts in the global and local media.

According to the merits of the jury's decision to award the prize to Jamal Hussein Ali, "the latter has an exceptional ability and courage that enabled him to document the moment of abuse and trauma, destruction and loss despite the fact that he was putting his life to danger; he can also communicate the feelings of fear through his writings to the readers and awaken the feelings of hope in them at the same time." The jury particularly praised his books; Wheat of Fire and The Breakage of the Sunflower, noting that Wheat of Fire – Women during the Nights of War is an investigative work and study of the conditions of women during the war, in which he covered the horrific attacks in Chechnya, Afghanistan, Kurdistan and Iraq, and reveals the ways women managed to take care of their families and protect them during the war. He also documents the courageous spirit, initiative and persistence and draws a picture of strength in confronting adversity. As for The Breakage of the Sunflower: pain of a war correspondent, the jury described it as a large documentary work full of emotions, and a diary of pain and destruction of the war correspondent which he experienced daily. This book documents the devastation the war left behind on the environment and the human mind at the same time.".

=== Arab Journalism Award 2005 ===
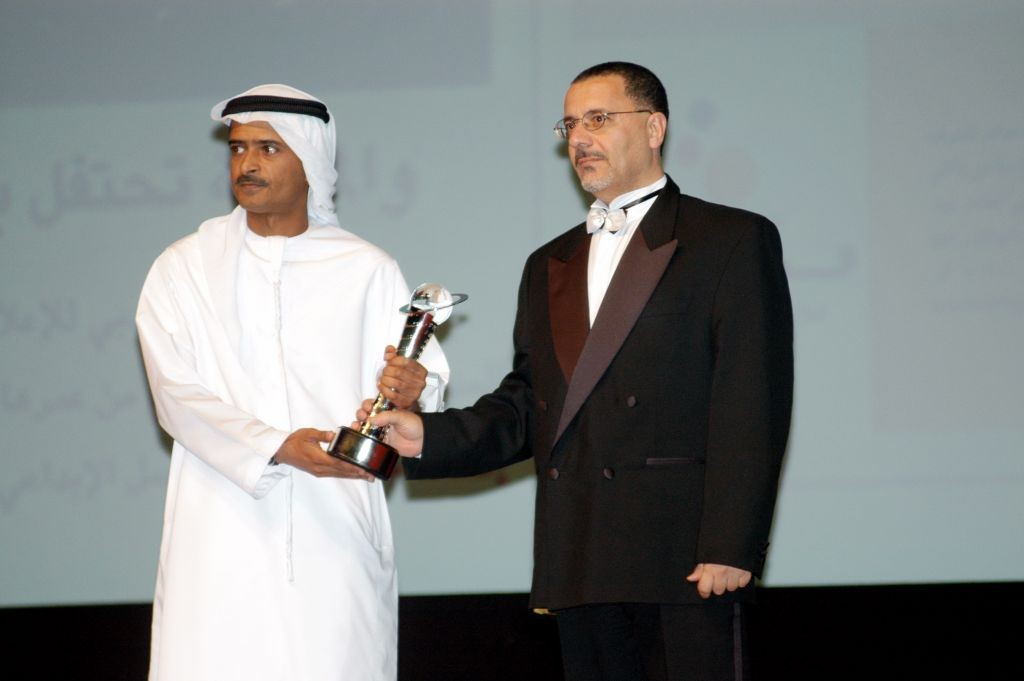
Receiving the Arab Journalism Award – Dubai – 2005

Jamal Hussein Ali won the Arab Journalism Award in its fourth cycle for investigative journalism category. This award was established in 1999 aiming to contribute to the development of the Arab press, and to the promotion of its path by honoring excellent and distinguished Arab journalists.

Jamal Hussein Ali was the first Iraqi journalist to be granted the award for an overall of ten investigative reports published in Al-Qabas newspaper about the city of Najaf in Iraq, entitled (Najaf on fire). The jury described this investigation "as a direct field work for the writer, comprising new information on a delicate issue by the time, a personal intervention from the core, an interpretation of information and a pursuit to uncover its background. All these are necessary conditions for the investigative reports".".

=== Literary awards ===
Jamal Hussein Ali won numerous literary awards in novel, short story and theater writing starting in 1983, when his novel A Southern Summer won a discretionary award, followed by his two novels Lighthouses and The Twin, as well as many other short stories.

== Extracts ==
"As if he split himself into two parts: the first part being dedicated to the loved ones and the second to book the tickets for the dead, he realized that all the tricks that he evaluated scientifically and practically will bring him nothing but half a ticket, half a breeze and half a thread for the high hopes he put to face the harsh resistance of death, which embrace its residence during this time and at this place."

"He who knows them will not let them live on the other's death, reconciling the will flowing out of his hands, not to embrace lilies which has bloomed, but which will bloom."

Baghdad's Dead

Jamal states, “Women stories struggling through the wars will remain the most excessive stories weighing the truth, as the butterflies wandering in a slower pace above the scorching fields; these women who only have their skin, their children's confusion and the sore worlds streets. Yet, we can never tell the reason behind the frozen picture in our memories, the picture that remains still in our minds after each war we live and write about, the picture of a woman scattering the whole alphabet to find the right lesson to be taught.”

“For example, if we pass by Chechen and Afghan women, the only song you can hum and sing with the Kurdish women in Iraq is the song that talks about half a century of wars, battles, fatigue arcades and ceilings of the shelters for rebels and stalkers; and a husband who barely spends half of the night with his wife getting an unremarkable kiss in return, leaving her cheek thirsty while awaiting his return or his coffin.”

Wheat of Fire – Women during the Nights of War

“We should not be writing about cities, especially enraged ones, based on our passion or hate towards them, but based on what is worth to be added to the timeline, the future memories and the generations' lesson. The war correspondent is considered the warning device that announces disasters settled by advertising agencies but wasted by distant wars through additional scandalous reports.”

The Breakage of the Sunflower: pain of a war correspondent, diaries, Afghanistan, Chechnya, Kurdistan, Iraq

“One trick can make you resist;

that what you see in this country does not exist,

but what you hold in your memories,

is Real.”

“When the war never ends and,

stays…

stays,

for many years,

questioning who started it becomes

senseless.”

“The worst part in the end of a war

is when women start counting what was left of men.”

Gratis Iraq

"I am all the lovers... I am their prediction, their confusion, their anger, their noise, their dignity, their way, their delight, their sadness, their steps, their ashes, their aches, their spikes, their acceleration, their buttons, their instinct, their evacuation, their shadows, their erasers, their days, their dreams, their betrayal, their memorial, their song, their shine, their defeat, their beauty and their retreat."

"I am the most charming dress of love, its most beautiful psalms, its sweetest shine, its most violent thunder, its most honorable blastulas, its best wings, its deepest quotes, its purest flames, its empty dissipation, its clearest thoughts, its extreme freshness, its lowest cliffs, its highest springs, its protected wishes, its boldest prophecies, its most fertile seeds, its brightest crowns, its longest praise, its noisiest steps, its thinnest crosses, its most transparent days and its smartest craziness."

CV CUPIDO-The Book of Love

== List of publications ==
- Amarjy letters (literature- Dar AlMada - Iraq/Lebanon-2019)
- Habat Baghdad (literature- Dar AlMada - Iraq/Lebanon - 2021)
- CV CUPIDO-The Love Book (Sonnets – Nova Bliss Publishing House – Kuwait 2016)
- The Great Men's Letters (Texts from around the world – NOW Publishing House – Jordan 2015)
- The Breakage of the Sunflower: pain of a war correspondent, diaries, Afghanistan, Chechnya, Kurdistan, Iraq (Documentary Literature – Al Ghaoun Publishing House – Lebanon 2013)
- Gratis Iraq (Sonnets- Al Ghaoun Publishing House – Lebanon 2012)
- Wheat of Fire – Women during the Nights of War (Documentary Literature – Riyad Al Rayis Publishing House – Lebanon 2009)
- Baghdad's Dead (Novel – 1st Edition: Al Farabi Publishing House 2008/ 2nd Edition: Al Koutoubi – Egypt 2015)
- The truth behind the weapons of mass destruction in Iran (Politics – Canadian Publishing House – Jordan 2006)
- The Coronets (Short stories – University Organization for Studies and Publishing – Lebanon 1988)
- The living Shrine (Short Stories – Ministry of Culture and Information – Iraq 1985)
- A Fading Shadow (Short Stories – Ministry of Culture and Information – Iraq 1987)
- The Twin (Novel – Ministry of Culture and Information – Iraq 1985)
- Lighthouses (Novel – Ministry of Culture and Information – Iraq 1985)
- A Summer at the South (Novel – Ministry of Culture and Information – Iraq 1983)

Translated Books

- Kremlin vs. Kuwait Crisis – Alexander Belonogov (Al Qabas Publishing House – Kuwait 2011)
- Islamic Awakening in Modern Russia – Alexis Malashenko Belonogov (Al Qabas Publishing House – Kuwait 1999)
- The Seven Leaders – Dmitri Volkogonov (Al Bayan Publishing House – UAE 1996)
