= Breakage (accounting) =

Type of accounting service

In telecommunications and accounting, breakage is any type of service that is unused by the customer. A good example would be gift cards or calling cards that have been sold but never redeemed. Revenue from breakage is almost entirely profitable, since companies need not provide any goods or services for unredeemed gift cards. It differs from shrinkage, which refers to items not used by the customer because they disappeared from inventory.

Another example of breakage can be found in traveler's checks, which were widely used before credit cards and other modern payment methods became more common. Companies like American Express and Thomas Cook Group profited from breakage in two key ways: through float income, where the issuer invests the funds from unredeemed checks, and from checks themselves going permanently unused. The longer the checks remained unredeemed, the more interest the issuer could earn, leading to substantial financial benefits. This practice raised concerns from consumer advocacy groups, who argued that companies were unfairly profiting from funds that rightfully belonged to consumers.

In the case of modern gift cards, many U.S. states have introduced unclaimed property laws to protect consumers. These laws often require companies to turn over the value of unredeemed gift cards to the state, where consumers can claim the balance as unclaimed property. This process, known as escheatment, ensures companies cannot indefinitely keep unused balances and that the funds are returned to the rightful owner.

== In telecommunications ==
In telecommunications, breakage can occur in several ways. The key elements in maximizing revenue versus service via breakage are:

- Use of quanta (pay for more than you use).
- Bundling of mixed services (force purchase of other services).
- Expiry of purchased service (ideally expire monthly).
- Inflexibility of plans (with high charges for exceeding arbitrary fixed limits).
- Low flexibility in changing plans (e.g. upgrade for free, pay to downgrade).
- Low transparency of service usage and fees.

The following examples are given in terms of voice calling, although they may also apply to data, short message or other services.

- Rounding-Up: A call will often be rounded up to a billing quantum. E.g. a call of 12 seconds may be billed as 60 seconds, and a call of 61 seconds billed as 120 seconds.
- Minimum Balance Requirement: A calling service may require a minimum balance before it can be used. E.g. The billing quanta is 60 seconds; however, the service will not let you begin a call unless you have sufficient funds for at least two minutes of calling.
- Unusable Amounts: The unit charge values may be such that it is impossible to use all of the nominal amount purchased. A $10 calling card is charged at $1.05 per minute. After $9.45 is used, the remaining $.55 is not sufficient to make any call.
- Abandoned Accounts: Accounts or calling cards which are lost or abandoned while still retaining significant credit. This is equivalent to the term "Breakage" in the gift card context.
- Expired Amounts: The subscriber is forced to pre-purchase large service amounts which expire if not used within a specified period.
- Unused/Unbalanced Bundles: A bundle of services includes a mix of features. For example, a $30 per month package may include 3000 free Short Messages and 60 national calling voice minutes. Many customers may use most of the short messages, but not use the voice minutes. Other customers may use most of the voice minutes, but not the short messages.
- Flat Plans, Bumpy Usage: A service plan may include a flat rate, e.g. 10 GB of data per month. However, the client's usage may be highly variable. E.g. one month they may use only 1 GB, despite having paid for 10 GB. The following month, they may use 20 GB, with the additional 10 GB being charged at a significantly higher "overflow" rate.

Careful research and planning can minimise some forms of breakage. For example, if a high percentage of mobile voice calls on the network are less than one minute in duration, then a rating plan could use an initial quanta of 60 seconds, followed by 1-second quanta. The plan appears to use a low quanta, but in fact many calls will be hit by the initial 60-second quanta.

Similarly, if many users are shown to use 14 GB of data per month on a data plan, then offering data plans of 10 GB or 30 GB will force many users to pay for much more data than they need, which will expire at the end of each month.

== See also ==
- Scrip
- Seigniorage
- Escheat
