= Shy FX =

British DJ and producer

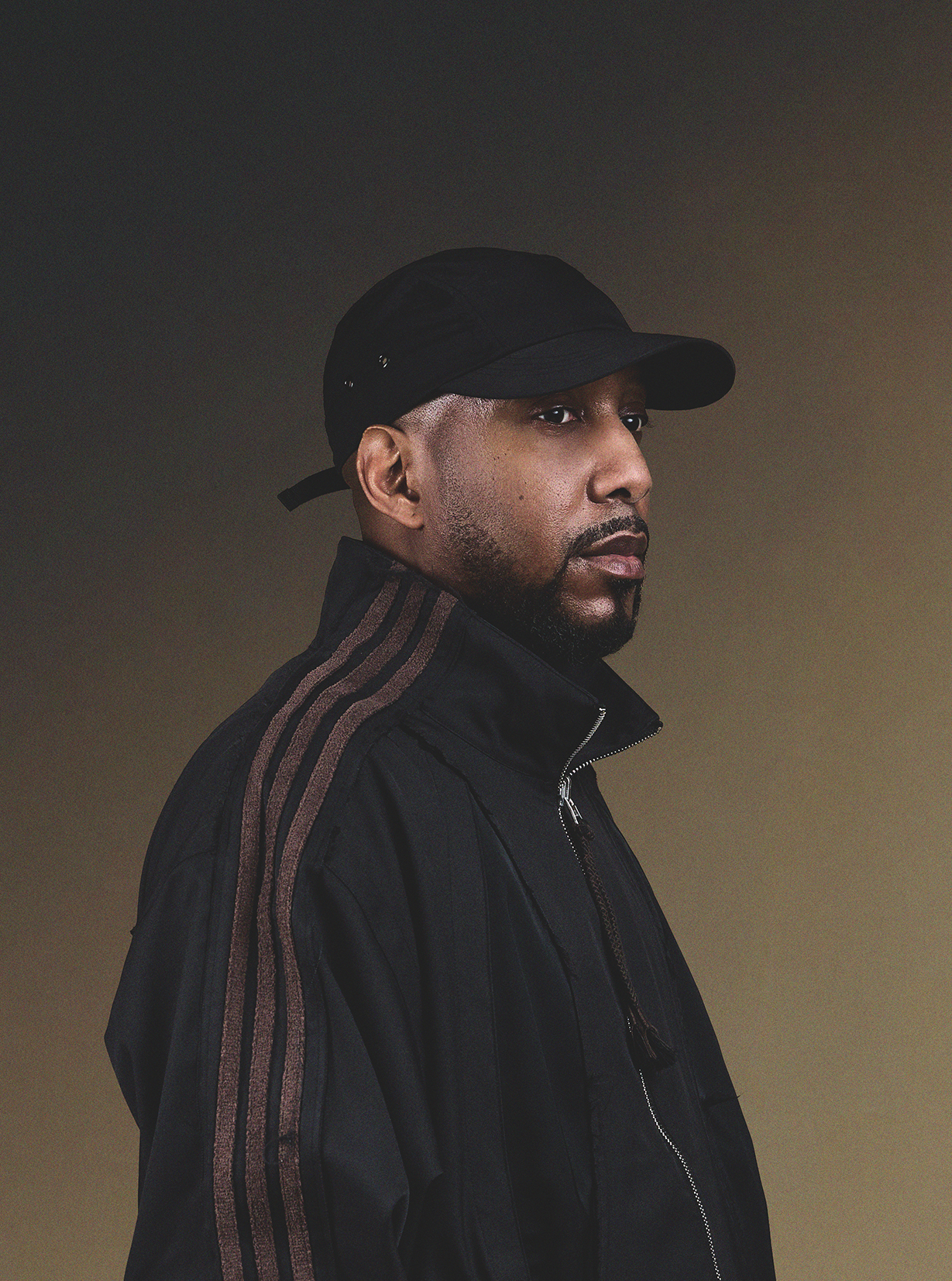
- Shy FX in 2026

Background information
- Also known as: 45 Roller
- Born: Andre Williams London, England
- Genres: Drum and bass; jungle; reggae; Hip-hop
- Occupations: DJ; record producer
- Years active: 1992–present
- Labels: Sound of the Underground; Ebony Recordings; Digital Soundboy; Cult.ure
- Website: http://www.digitalsoundboy.com/

Andre Williams, better known as Shy FX, is a British DJ and producer from London. He specialises in drum and bass and jungle music.

== Biography ==
He was born in London, England. Shy FX's debut record was "Jungle Love", released in 1992 on the Permission to Dance label. Soon after, he signed to Sound of the Underground Records (often abbreviated as S.O.U.R.) and in 1994 released the breakthrough ragga jungle track "Original Nuttah" (featuring vocals from MC UK Apache) which helped to cement his position as a mainstay producer of the jungle/drum & bass scene.

Throughout his career, he has collaborated with T Power, both as Ebony Dubsters and Shy FX and T Power; their 2001 breakthrough track "Shake Ur Body" with vocalist Di (real name Dianne Joseph) was a number 7 hit in the UK Singles Chart. Released on EMI subsidiary Positiva, it gained widespread support from both club and commercial radio DJs and helped to further popularise drum & bass as a mainstream music genre.

The success of "Shake Ur Body" was followed by the duo's album Set It Off, released in 2002 on Pete Tong's label FFRR. Several EPs and single releases followed; by 2005, Shy FX had made the decision to consolidate his releases onto his own label and founded Digital Soundboy Recordings. In collaboration with T Power, they subsequently released the album Diary of a Digital Sound Boy on 17 October 2005, featuring the songs "Feelings", "On the Run" and "Plastic Soul". Shy FX and T Power also released "Don't Wanna Know" featuring Di and MC Skibadee. The song was notably used on the UK television programme Soccer AM as part of the 'Skills Skool' feature.

Shy FX produced "Da Feelin" for Dizzee Rascal's 2007 album, Maths + English. He also produced "Can't Tek No More" on Dizzee Rascal's 2009 album, Tongue N' Cheek. His remix of Naughty Boy, Wiley and Emeli Sandé's song "Never Be Your Woman" was released as the single rather than the original mix. Shy's remix charted at number eight on the UK Singles Chart. He remixed "She Said", a number 3 UK chart single by Plan B. His remix was released on both the "She Said" single and on the deluxe edition of Plan B's The Defamation of Strickland Banks.

More recently, he produced "Raver" featuring Kano, Donae'o and Roses Gabor, plus the UK artist Yasmin's first single, "On My Own". He announced that his album, Larger Than Life, was originally scheduled for a 2011 release but has since been renamed Cornerstone but did not have a fixed release date.

Williams also produced Yasmin's third single "Light Up (The World)", which features Ms. Dynamite. It peaked at No. 50 in the UK Singles Chart.

DJ Fresh's single "Gold Dust" was re-released, with the Shy FX Re-Edit as a single, on 2 December 2012. The extended play includes multiple new remixes.

In 2013, he released a single called "Soon Come" featuring Liam Bailey, famous for his collaboration with Chase & Status on their track "Blind Faith". The song reached number 55 in the UK Singles Chart. He also released the single "Cloud 9" in 2013, a collaboration with Ms. Dynamite.

In August 2014, Shy FX remixed the title track from London Grammar's debut album, If You Wait.

For 2014's Red Bull Culture Clash, Shy FX joined forces with Chase & Status, David Rodigan and MC Rage to form the soundsystem 'Rebel Sound'. They went on to win the clash, defeating fellow crews Stone Love, Boy Better Know and A$AP Mob.

== Digital Soundboy label ==
Williams and T Power (Marc Royal) started the Digital Soundboy label in 2005, initially releasing their own material but quickly expanding to include the artists Visionary, Benny Page and Breakage. The label subsequently grew its genre coverage to the point where its discography includes electro, drum and bass, jungle, dubstep, house and UK funky releases from dozens of artists. All releases are observable as being in Digital Soundboy's "house style", as is the case with most drum and bass and dubstep labels.

Noted dubstep producers Skream, Benga and Caspa have all released tracks on DSB, as have drum and bass and dubstep crossover artists Breakage, Calibre, DJ Fresh and Redlight (a.k.a. DJ Clipz).

The label ended in December 2015.

== Selected discography ==
Year	Single	Peak chart positions				Certification	Album
Year	Single	UK	UK Dance	UK Indie	AUS	Certification	Album
1994	"Original Nuttah" (with UK Apache)	39	–	–	–	BPI: Silver; RMNZ: Gold	Non-album singles
1998	"Bambaata"	60	1	–	–		Non-album singles
2002	"Shake Ur Body" (with T Power featuring Di)	7	1	–	67		Set It Off
2002	"Don't Wanna Know" (with T Power featuring Di and Skibadee)	19	–	–	–		Set It Off
2002	"Wolf"	60	1	–	–		Non-album singles
2003	"Feelin' U" (with T Power featuring Kele Le Roc)	34	–	–	–		Set It Off
2003	"RA"	79	1	–	–		Non-album singles
2005	"Feelings" (with T Power)	76	-	-	–		Non-album singles
2006	"Everyday" (with T Power featuring Top Cat)	75	-	-	–		Non-album singles
2012	"Light Up (The World)" (with Yasmin and Ms. Dynamite	50	-	-	–		Non-album singles
2013	"Soon Come" (featuring Liam Bailey)	55	18	6	–		Cornerstone
2013	"Cloud 9" (with Ms. Dynamite)	62	10	8	–		Non-album singles
2016	"Honey" (featuring Kiko Bun)	–	–	–	–		Non-album singles
2017	"We Just Don't Care" (featuring Shingai)	–	–	–	–		Non-album singles
2017	"Chocolate" (featuring Breakage, Roses Gabor and Ghetts)	–	–	–	–		Non-album singles
2018	"Call Me" (featuring Maverick Sabre)	–	–	–	–		Raggamuffin Soundtape
2018	"Badboy Business" (featuring Kate Stewart and Mr Williamz)	–	–	–	–		Raggamuffin Soundtape
2018	"Roll the Dice" (featuring Lily Allen and Stamina MC)	–	–	–	–	BPI: Platinum; RMNZ: 2× Platinum	Raggamuffin Soundtape
2019	"Rudeboy Lovesong" (featuring Sweetie Irie and Cara Delevingne)	–	–	–	–		Raggamuffin Soundtape
2019	"Bad After We" (featuring Kojey Radical and Ghetts)	–	–	–	–		Raggamuffin Soundtape
2020	"Rain / Outrun" (as 45 Roller)	–	–	–	–		Non-album singles
2021	"Michael Knight" (with Breakage)	–	–	–	–		Darker Than Blue
2021	"I Got You" (with Breakage and Break featuring Tyler Daley)	–	–	–	–		Darker Than Blue
2022	"Come Around Slowly" (with Liam Bailey)	–	–	–	–		TBA
2022	"Amazing" (featuring Agent Sasco)	—	—	—	–		TBA
"—" denotes single that did not chart or was not released.
