= Breakage (musician) =

British electronic producer and DJ

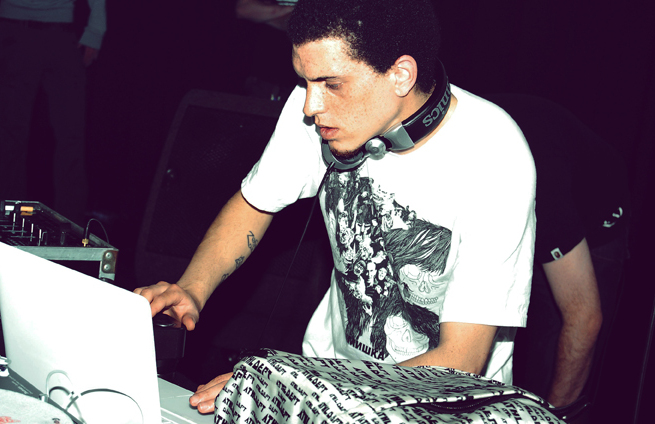
- Breakage in 2010

Background information
- Born: James Daniel Boyle; 19 July 1982 (age 43); Slough, Berkshire, England
- Origin: London, England
- Genres: Dubstep, Jungle, drum and bass
- Occupations: Producer, DJ
- Instrument: Turntables
- Years active: 1999–present
- Labels: Reinforced Records, Bassbin, Critical Music, Breakin, Scientific Wax, Inperspective, Emcee, Planet Mu, Digital Soundboy, Subtle Audio Digital
- Website: myspace.com/breakagedsb

James Daniel Boyle (born 28 November 1982), better known as Breakage, is a British electronic producer and DJ. He is currently signed to the Digital Soundboy label.

== Discography ==
=== Albums ===
Title	Album details
This Too Shall Pass	Released 22 May 2006; Label: Bassbin; Formats: 12" LP, CD, download
Foundation	Released: 22 March 2010; Label: Digital Soundboy; Formats: 12" LP, CD, download
When The Night Comes	Released: 25 May 2015; Label: Digital Soundboy; Formats: Download

=== EPs ===
- Breakage & Threshold (Reinforced Records, 2002)
- Back Off (Reinforced Records, 2001)
- The Break Age (Reinforced Records, 2002)
- Hinds Sight (Bassbin, 2007)
- Foundation Promo EP (Digital Soundboy, 2010)

=== Singles ===
Year	Single	Peak chart positions	Album
Year	Single	UK	Album
2009	"Run 'Em Out (featuring Roots Manuva)/Higher"	—	Foundation
2009	"Hard" (feat. David Rodigan & Newham Generals)	—	Foundation
2010	"Speechless (featuring Donae'o)/Justified (featuring Erin)"	—	Foundation
2011	"Fighting Fire" (feat. Jess Mills)	34	TBA

=== Other songs ===
- 2004: "Plum Fairy" (Breakage)
- 2005: "Staggered Dub" (Breakage)
- 2006: "Drowning / The 9th Hand" (Breakage)
- 2006: "Blue Mountain" (Breakage)
- 2007: "Clarendon/The Shroud" (Breakage)
- 2008: "Cooper" (Breakage) (12-inch vinyl)
- 2008: "Callahan/Untitled" (Breakage)
- 2009: "Together (Breakage|David Rodigan)/Rain" (Breakage)
- 2009: "Futurist (Instra:mental) / Late Night" (Breakage)
- 2011: "Trance / Comatose / Aw Yea
- 2011: "Panic Room/Circumference" (Breakage)
