= Afro King =

1995 single by EMF

Single by EMF
- Released: October 1995
- Label: Parlophone
- Songwriter(s): Ian Dench
- Producer(s): Ian Dench; Bruce Lampcov

EMF singles chronology
"I'm a Believer" (1995)	"Afro King" (1995)

"Afro King" is the last single by British band EMF, released in late 1995. It was not a commercial success, peaking at number 51 on the UK Singles Chart.

== Track listings ==
The title track and tracks two and three ("Too Much" and Easy) on the first CD single were new songs, having not been included on any of the band's albums, including the compilation Epsom Mad Funkers: The Best of EMF. Track four, "Bring Me Down" was taken from the band's final studio album, Cha Cha Cha. Included on the second CD single are several previous EMF singles.

CD1

1. "Afro King" (single version)
2. "Too Much"
3. "Easy"
4. "Bring Me Down"

CD 2

1. "Afro King" (single version)
2. "Unbelievable"
3. "Children"
4. "I Believe"
