= Epsom Mad Funkers: The Best of EMF =

Greatest hits album by EMF
- Released: 11 June 2001
- Genre: Alternative dance, alternative rock, electronica
- Label: EMI
- Producer: EMF, Jonny Dollar

EMF chronology
Cha Cha Cha (1995)	Epsom Mad Funkers: The Best of EMF (2001)	Long Live the New Flesh (2013)

Professional ratings
Review scores
Source	Rating
AllMusic	4/5 stars

Epsom Mad Funkers: The Best of EMF is a compilation and the final album by Gloucestershire alternative dance band EMF, released in 2001. It contains their last two singles "Incredible" and "Let's Go".

== Track listing ==
CD 1:

1. "Unbelievable"
2. "I Believe"
3. "Children"
4. "Lies" (Jim's Mix)
5. "Girl of an Age"
6. "Getting Through"
7. "They're Here"
8. "It's You"
9. "Perfect Day (Perfect Mix)"
10. "Glass Smash Jack"
11. "Shining"
12. "I'm a Believer (EMF & Reeves & Mortimer)"
13. "Incredible"
14. "Let's Go"
15. "Search And Destroy"
16. "EMF" (Live at The Bilson)

CD 2:

1. "Unbelievable" (Bambaattaa House Mix)
2. "I Believe" (Colt 45 Mix)
3. "Children" (Battle for the Minds of North Amerikkka Mix)
4. "Head the Ball" (Put Away in the Back of the Net by Appollo 440)
5. "Lies" (Dust Bros 12" Club Mix)
6. "It's You" (13½% Extra Mix)
7. "They're Here" (D:Ream Mix)
8. "Perfect Day" (Chris And James' Epic Adventure)
9. "The Light That Burns Twice As Bright" (Mystic Mix)
10. "It's You" (Rad Rice Mix)
11. "Unbelievable" (Ralph Jezzard Remix)
