= Amanda Ghost discography =

- Studio albums: 1
- EPs: 1
- Singles: 6
- Music videos: 3
- Promotional singles: 3

English singer Amanda Ghost has released one studio album, one extended play, six singles (including two as a featured artist), three promotional singles and three music videos.

== Albums ==
=== Studio albums ===
| Title | Album details |
|---|---|
| Ghost Stories | Released: 22 August 2000; Label: Warner Bros.; Formats: CD |

=== Extended plays ===
| Title | Album details |
|---|---|
| Blood on the Line | Released: 8 May 2006; Label: Self-released; Format: CD |

== Singles ==
=== As lead artist ===
| Title | Year | Peak chart positions | | Album |
| Title | Year | UK | US Dance | Album |
|---|---|---|---|---|
| "Idol" | 2000 | 63 | 18 | Ghost Stories |
| "Filthy Mind" | 2000 | — | 5 | Ghost Stories |
| "Glory Girl" | 2000 | 90 | — | Ghost Stories |
| "Time Machine" (featuring Boy George) | 2007 | — | — | Blood on the Line |

=== As featured artist ===
| Title | Year | Peak chart positions | Album |
| Title | Year | UK | Album |
|---|---|---|---|
| "Grow" (James Hardway featuring Amanda Ghost) | 1998 | — | A Positive Sweat |
| "Break My World" (Dark Globe featuring Amanda Ghost) | 2004 | 52 | Nostalgia for the Future |

=== Promotional singles ===
| Title | Year | Album |
|---|---|---|
| "Silver Lining" | 2000 | Ghost Stories |
| "Girls Like You" | 2005 | Non-album single |
| "Monster" | 2005 | Non-album single |

== Music videos ==
| Title | Year | Director(s) |
|---|---|---|
| "Idol" | 2000 | — |
| "Filthy Mind" | 2000 | Sean Ellis |
| "Glory Girl" | 2000 | — |
