= The Last Poets (album) =

Studio album by The Last Poets
- Released: June 1970
- Studio: Impact Sound Studio
- Genres: Spoken word; jazz; poetry; political rap; proto-hip hop
- Length: 31:27
- Label: Douglas
- Producer: East Wind Associates

The Last Poets chronology
The Last Poets (1970)	This Is Madness (1971)

Singles from The Last Poets
- 1. "On the Subway" Released: 1970

The Last Poets is the debut studio album by spoken word recording artists The Last Poets. It was released in 1970 through Douglas Records. Recording sessions took place at Impact Sound Studio with production by East Wind Associates, managers of The Last Poets at the time of recording. The album peaked at #29 on the Billboard 200 albums chart and at #3 on the Top R&B/Hip-Hop Albums chart in the United States.

It spawned a single, "On the Subway", which was sampled by Digable Planets for their 1992 song "Rebirth of Slick (Cool Like Dat)". The songs from The Last Poets were used by various hip hop musicians, including N.W.A, Notorious B.I.G. and Brand Nubian. The track "Wake Up, Niggers" is featured on the soundtrack album to the film Performance, also released in 1970.

== Critical reception ==
Professional ratings
Review scores
Source	Rating
AllMusic	5/5 stars
Encyclopedia of Popular Music	4/5 stars
Uncut	4/5 stars

Robert Christgau wrote of the group and the album in his 1970 column for The Village Voice:

"A few weeks ago I saw an incredible performance at the Apollo by a group comprising two shouting poets and an Afro-percussionist, the first time I'd ever really dug on the 'jazz poetry' idea. The recorded version, on Douglas, is a hot seller (over 350,000) and highly recommended; acerbic and exciting and as politically uncompromising as anything ever recorded. Name of group and record: The Last Poets. Frightening and beautiful."

David Bowie named it one of his 25 favorite albums, writing in Vanity Fair: "One of the fundamental building blocks of rap. All the essential 'griot' narrative skills, splintered with anger here, produce one of the most political vinyls to ever crack the Billboard chart."

== Track listing ==
No.	Title	Lead vocals	Length
1.	"Run, Nigger"	Abiodun Oyewole	1:14
2.	"On the Subway"	Alafía Pudím	1:33
3.	"Niggers Are Scared of Revolution"	Omar Ben Hassen	5:16
4.	"Black Thighs"	Omar Ben Hassen	1:31
5.	"Gashman"	Abiodun Oyewole	2:45
6.	"Wake Up, Niggers"	Alafía Pudím	2:49
7.	"New York, New York"	Abiodun Oyewole	3:36
8.	"Jones Comin' Down"	Alafía Pudím	2:51
9.	"Just Because"	Omar Ben Hassan	2:31
10.	"Black Wish"	Omar Ben Hassen	1:34
11.	"When the Revolution Comes"	Abiodun Oyewole	1:47
12.	"Two Little Boys"	Abiodun Oyewole	1:51
13.	"Surprises"	Alafía Pudím	2:09
Total length:			31:27

== Personnel ==
- Charles Davis – poet, lead vocals (tracks: 1, 5, 7, 9, 12), backing vocals
- Jalaluddin Mansur Nuriddin – poet, lead vocals (tracks: 2, 6, 8, 13), backing vocals
- Umar Bin Hassan – poet, lead vocals (tracks: 3, 4, 10, 11), backing vocals
- Raymond "Nilaja" Hurrey – percussion
- Danfort Griffiths – engineering
- Doug Harris – photography

== Charts ==
Chart (1970)	Peak position
US Billboard 200	29
US Top R&B/Hip-Hop Albums (Billboard)	3
