= Be Bop or Be Dead =

Studio album by Umar Bin Hassan
- Released: 1993
- Genre: Rap, jazz
- Label: Axiom
- Producer: Bill Laswell

Umar Bin Hassan chronology
Be Bop or Be Dead (1993)	To the Last (2001)

Be Bop or Be Dead is the debut solo album by the American musician and Last Poet Umar Bin Hassan, released in 1993. Hassan had spent many of the preceding years isolated from his group and his music while dealing with drug and personal issues. The album was a commercial disappointment.

== Production ==
The album was produced by Bill Laswell. Laswell reached out to the Last Poets after the group had performed in a scene of Poetic Justice; only Hassan returned to the studio after the first day of recording sessions. Bernie Worrell, Buddy Miles, Aïyb Dieng, Bootsy Collins, Foday Musa Suso, and Abiodun Oyewole were among the musicians who contributed to Be Bop or Be Dead. A total of 15 musicians played on the album.

"This is Madness" and "Niggers Are Scared of Revolution" are remakes of Last Poets songs. "Malcolm" is a biographical song about Malcolm X.

== Critical reception ==
Professional ratings
Review scores
Source	Rating
AllMusic	4/5 stars
Calgary Herald	A
Chicago Tribune	3.5/4 stars
MusicHound R&B: The Essential Album Guide	5/5 stars
Spin Alternative Record Guide	8/10
USA Today	2.5/4 stars

Trouser Press called the album an "acidic, jazz-centric" project, writing that it "is filled with riffs on jazz legends and autobiographical notes on the successes and failures of black nationalism." The Washington Post concluded that "its most moving pieces offer mature reflections on life, love and the deadly seductions of the street." The Washington City Paper panned the Last Poets remakes, but admired "'Personal Things' and 'Bum Rush', [which] recall the more traditional sound sculptures of early Last Poets, with a lone voice riding over a predominant mix of African-based instrumentation—dousongonni, kora, chatan, congas, and berimbau." The Chicago Tribune opined that, "if Hassan has an overriding message, it is for African-Americans to learn to love themselves, while his poems confront the obstacles, both social and psychological, that prevent that from happening." The Pittsburgh Post-Gazette declared: "The attitude is punk, but the voice is black and impatient."

Vibe determined that, "outside of the remake of 'Niggers Are Scared of Revolution', the album just doesn't work ... [Hassan] has been in a cultural time warp for the past two decades." Billboard deemed the album "an incomparable treatise by a true pioneer of our modern oral tradition." Newsday stated that the songs "concern the energy of bebop jazz, Malcolm X, pop music, love, honor and 42nd Street ... 'Bum Rush', a didactic yet sympathetic look at the urban dilemma, observes, 'There's always the streets. From shoeshine boys to big time to trick or treat'." The Calgary Herald called Hassan "as powerful as ever," writing that "his anger, his call for revolution, has not diminished over the years." USA Today missed "rap's catchy rhymes and syncopation," noting that Hassan "speaks over driving backbeats or jazzy rhythms."

AllMusic wrote that Laswell "virtually recreated the Last Poets tapestry, except that this time there's an electronic overlay as well as a percussive one ... [Hassan's] voice hasn't been dulled by the years." The Spin Alternative Record Guide labeled Be Bop or Be Dead "a triumphant return to the inspiration and intensity of the Poets' first two albums."

== Track listing ==
No.	Title	Length
1.	"Niggers Are Scared of Revolution"	5:23
2.	"AM"	7:59
3.	"Bum Rush"	5:29
4.	"This Is Madness"	5:27
5.	"Malcolm"	6:23
6.	"Pop"	4:41
7.	"Love"	6:07
8.	"40 Deuce Street"	3:48
9.	"Personal Things"	4:30
10.	"This Is Madness (Metal Mix)"	5:33
