= Holy Terror (album) =

Studio album by the Last Poets
- Released: 1995; Black Arc 1993
- Genres: Funk, spoken word
- Length: 62:19
- Labels: Rykodisc; Black Arc; Innerhythmic
- Producer: Bill Laswell

The Last Poets chronology
Scatterap / Home (1994)	Holy Terror (1995)	Time Has Come (1997)

Holy Terror is an album by rap/spoken word pioneers the Last Poets, released in 1995. The album was financed and released by P-Vine Records in Japan and then released by Rykodisc Records in the United States and the United Kingdom later that same year, with a rerelease in 2004 by Innerhythmic. The U.S. and UK releases contain a bonus track titled "Black and Strong (Homesick)."

== Production ==
The lead figures in the Last Poets at this time were Umar Bin Hassan and Abiodun Oyewole. The album was part of the Black Arc Series, launched by producer Bill Laswell in 1992.

== Critical reception ==
Professional ratings
Review scores
Source	Rating
AllMusic	3/5 stars
The Encyclopedia of Popular Music	3/5 stars
Spin Alternative Record Guide	7/10

AllMusic wrote: "Containing some of the Poets' most trenchant political and social lyrics, Holy Terror shows the Last Poets, Umar Bin Hassan and Abiodun Oyewole, still as fiery and sharp as ever." CMJ New Music Monthly called the album "the bomb," writing that "it's as good as anything they've recorded in their 25-plus year career."

== Track listing ==
1. "Invocation"
2. "Homesick"
3. "Black Rage"
4. "Men-tality"
5. "Pelourino"
6. "Funk"
7. "If We Only Knew"
8. "Illusion of Self"
9. "Talk Show"
10. "Black and Strong (Homesick)"
11. "Last Rites"

== Personnel ==
- Umar Bin Hassan, Abiodun Oyewole, Grandmaster Melle Mel – voices
- Bootsy Collins – guitars, bass
- Bernie Worrell – organ, piano, clavinet, synthesizer
- Bill Laswell – bass beats, samples, loops
- Aïyb Dieng – congas, chatan, bells, talking drum, doff, tambourine, gongs, percussion
- George Clinton – guest vocals on "Black and Strong (Homesick)"
