= Mo Beasley =

American poet

- Born: June 7, 1967 (age 59); Brooklyn, New York
- Occupations: poet, author, educator, and public speaker
- Writing career
- Pen name: The Headmaster
- Period: 2000s-present

Mo Beasley (born June 7, 1967) is an American performance poet, educator, author, and public speaker.

== Biography ==
Mo Beasley has more than 20 years' experience in sexuality, race, manhood, and arts advocacy work. He authored the poem "No Good ~~Nigg@~~ Bluez" which was later adapted into a play by the same title. With Jerome "J-Square" Jones and author SekouWrites, he co-produced and co-authored the play, which premiered at the New York International Fringe Festival in 2003. It has since traveled to various colleges and universities and conventions. The following year, Jones published the book No Good ~~Nigg@~~ Bluez: Poems and Tales for Black Men in a Post Civil Rights America (Scripted Linguistics, 2004) with Beasley. He has produced an erotic poetry series entitled UrbanErotika, which showcased at the Bowery Poetry Club, The Adinkra House, among other places.

On the performance stage, Beasley has performed with Sonia Sanchez, Abiodun Oyewole of The Last Poets, Louis Reyes Rivera, Nana Camille Yarbrough, and many others. He has performed at venues such as the Blue Note (New York City), Nuyorican Poets Café, New Jersey Performing Arts Center, American Museum of Natural History, among others.

On the topics of manhood, sexuality, and art as action, Mo has been quoted, profiled, and/or featured on both local and national media outlets, including BETJ (My Two Cents television talk show); NPR's News and Notes; Fox5 News; rolling out Urban Style weekly; XM Satellite Radio; Air America Radio and many other outlets. In 2006, The Daily News selected Mo Beasley as one of "50 Unsung New York Heroes." In 2007, Beasley was a featured panelist at the Black and Male in America 3-Day National Conference, presented by writer, activist Kevin Powell. There, Beasley shared the platform with scholar Dr. Michael Eric Dyson and several other activists and writers.

As workshop facilitator/lecturer, Beasley counts SCO/Family Dynamics, Global Kids, New York University, Medgar Evers College at the City University of New York, Howard University, and the Schomburg Center for Research in Black Culture as some of his clients.

A native of Boston, MA, Mo Beasley graduated from Howard University (BA in Theater Arts) and currently lives in Brooklyn, New York. He is a Teaching Artist at the Brooklyn Academy of Music.
