= This Is Madness =

1971 studio album by The Last Poets

Studio album by The Last Poets
- Released: March 1971
- Studio: Mediasound, New York City
- Genre: Spoken word; jazz; poetry; political rap
- Length: 35:10
- Label: Douglas
- Producer: Alan Douglas; Stefan Bright

The Last Poets chronology
The Last Poets (1970)	This Is Madness (1971)	Chastisement (1972)

Singles from This Is Madness
- 1. "O.D." Released: 1970; 2. "True Blues" Released: 1971

Professional ratings
Review scores
Source	Rating
AllMusic	4.5/5 stars

This Is Madness is the second studio album by spoken-word recording artists The Last Poets. It was released in 1971 through Douglas Records. Recording sessions took place at Mediasound Studios, with production by Alan Douglas and Stefan Bright. The album peaked at No. 104 on the Billboard 200 albums chart and at No. 14 on the Top R&B Albums chart in the United States.

It spawned two singles, "O.D." and "True Blues". The songs from This Is Madness were used by various hip hop musicians.

== Track listing ==
No.	Title	Writer(s)	Length
1.	"True Blues"	Alafía Pudím	2:04
2.	"Related to What Chant"	Alafía Pudím; Omar Ben Hassen; Raymond "Nilaja" Hurrey	1:12
3.	"Related to What"	Omar Ben Hassen	3:14
4.	"Black Is Chant"	Alafía Pudím; Omar Ben Hassen; Raymond "Nilaja" Hurrey	0:58
5.	"Black Is"	Omar Ben Hassen	2:33
6.	"Time"	Omar Ben Hassen	1:43
7.	"Mean Machine Chant"	Alafía Pudím; Omar Ben Hassen; Raymond "Nilaja" Hurrey	1:24
8.	"Mean Machine"	Alafía Pudím	4:05
9.	"White Man's Got a God Complex"	Alafía Pudím	3:41
10.	"Opposites"	Alafía Pudím	1:48
11.	"Black People What Y'all Gon' Do Chant"	Alafía Pudím; Omar Ben Hassen; Raymond "Nilaja" Hurrey	0:47
12.	"Black People What Y'all Gon' Do"	Omar Ben Hassen	3:25
13.	"O.D."	Alafía Pudím	3:10
14.	"This Is Madness Chant"	Alafía Pudím; Omar Ben Hassen; Raymond "Nilaja" Hurrey	1:07
15.	"This Is Madness"	Omar Ben Hassen	4:54
Total length:			35:10

== Personnel ==
- Jalaluddin Mansur Nuriddin – poet, lead vocals, backing vocals
- Umar Bin Hassan – poet, lead vocals, backing vocals
- Raymond "Nilaja" Hurrey – percussion

Technical

- Alan Douglas – producer
- Stefan Bright – producer
- Anthony C. Bongiovi – engineering
- Bilal Farid – photography
- Abdul Mati (Abdul Mati Klarwein) – painting
- Bob Vermosa – lettering

== Charts ==
Chart (1971)	Peak position
US Billboard 200	104
US Top R&B/Hip-Hop Albums (Billboard)	14
