= Getting Through =

Getting Through may refer to:

== Music ==
- Getting Through, a 2014 album by The Riptide Movement, #1 in Ireland
- "Getting Through", a 1980 song by The Cars from Panorama
- "Getting Through", a 1992 song by EMF from Stigma
- "Getting Through", a 2005 song by Steve Howe from Homebrew 3
