= Unexplained (EP) =

1992 EP by EMF

Unexplained EP

EP by EMF
- Released: 20 April 1992
- Length: 15:30
- Label: Parlophone; EMI America
- Producer: Ralph Jezzard; Ian Dench

EMF chronology
Schubert Dip (1991)	Unexplained EP (1992)	Stigma (1992)

Professional ratings
Review scores
Source	Rating
AllMusic	4/5 stars

Unexplained EP is an extended play (EP) by English band EMF. One of the tracks on the EP is a cover of Iggy & the Stooges' 1973 song "Search and Destroy". Released on 20 April 1992, the EP peaked at number 18 on the UK Singles Chart, number 16 on the Irish Singles Chart, and number 10 on the Portuguese Singles Chart.

== Track listing ==
1. "Getting Through"
2. "Far from Me"
3. "The Same"
4. "Search and Destroy"

== Charts ==
Chart (1992)	Peak position
Australia (ARIA)	136
Europe (Eurochart Hot 100)	61
Ireland (IRMA)	16
Portugal (AFP)	10
UK Singles (OCC)	18
