= Stigma (EMF album) =

Studio album by EMF
- Released: 28 September 1992
- Recorded: 1992
- Genre: Alternative dance, alternative rock
- Length: 40:16
- Label: Parlophone
- Producer: Ralph Jezzard

EMF chronology
Unexplained (1992)	Stigma (1992)	Cha Cha Cha (1995)

Singles from Stigma
- 1. "They're Here" Released: 7 September 1992; 2. "It's You That Leaves Me Dry" Released: November 1992

Stigma is the second studio album by English alternative band EMF, released in 1992. It yielded two UK hit singles: "They’re Here" (no. 29) and "It’s You" (no. 23).

The follow-up to the commercially successful Schubert Dip, Stigma failed to make the UK top 10 Album Charts (peaking at no. 19), and perhaps worse, was only in the charts for two weeks (its predecessor reached no. 3 and charted for 19 weeks).

"It's You That Leaves Me Dry" was re-mixed and re-titled "It's You" for the single release.

== Reception ==
Geoff Orens of AllMusic gave the album three-and-a-half stars out of five, feeling that the overall mood and lyrical themes of the album were different from what would have been expected by fans: "For a fan base ready for more 'Unbelievable''s however, Stigma was far from enticing and unfortunately sold less than hoped, leading to EMF's less-than-grand return to the foray of pop on Cha Cha Cha."

== Track listing ==
All songs written by EMF, except where noted.

1. "They're Here" - 4:22
2. "Arizona" (James Atkin, Ian Dench) - 4:05
3. "It's You That Leaves Me Dry" (Atkin, Dench) - 3:54
4. "Never Know" (Atkin, Dench) - 4:02
5. "Blue Highs" (Dench) - 3:48
6. "Inside" (Atkin) - 3:26
7. "Getting Through" (Dench) - 4:23
8. "She Bleeds" (Dench) - 4:05
9. "Dog" - 3:56
10. "The Light that Burns Twice as Bright..." - 4:09

== Personnel ==
=== EMF ===
- James Atkin: vocals, guitars
- Ian Dench: guitars, keyboards
- Derry Brownson: sampling, keyboards
- Zac Foley: bass guitar
- Mark de Cloedt: drums, percussion

=== Guest musicians ===
P.P. Arnold: backing vocals on "Arizona", "It's You That Leaves Me Dry", "Blue Highs", "Inside" and "The Light that Burns Twice as Bright..."
