= They're Here =

1992 single by EMF

Single by EMF

from the album Stigma
- Released: 7 September 1992
- Length: 3:49
- Label: EMI
- Songwriter: EMF
- Producers: James Atkin; Ian Dench; Ralph Jezzard

EMF singles chronology
"Getting Through" (1992)	"They're Here" (1992)	"It's You" (1992)

"They're Here" is a song by British band EMF, released in September 1992 by EMI Records as the first single from their second album, Stigma (1992). The song is written by the band and produced by James Atkin, Ian Dench and Ralph Jezzard. It reached number 29 on the UK Singles Chart.

== Track listings ==
- CDR 6321 (CD)
1. "They're Here" (album version)
2. "Phantasmagoric"
3. "The Low Spark of High Heeled Boys"
- R 6321 (7-inch)
1. "They're Here" (album version)
2. "Phantasmagoric"
- 12R 6321 (12-inch)
1. "They're Here" (Cenobite mix)
2. "They're Here" (Mosh mix)
3. "Phantasmagoric"

== Charts ==
Chart (1992)	Peak position
Australia (ARIA)	195
UK Singles (OCC)	29
UK Airplay (Music Week)	41
US Modern Rock Tracks (Billboard)	27
