= Whistler (band) =

Whistler were a British indie band who released two albums on the Wiiija label.

Formed by Ian Dench after leaving EMF, the band consisted of Dench, Kerry Shaw (who had previously released a dance single through EMI called "Could This Be Love") and James Topham (who had previously played with Brian Eno). Both of the band's albums feature contributions from Tim Weller (of Grand Drive) and Fuzz Townshend.

Whistler gigged regularly around London between 1998 and 2000, including four concerts at The Water Rats in King's Cross. Each of these performances included a special cover version. Studio recordings of these were put together as the Intermission EP.

== Discography ==
=== Albums ===
- Whistler (Wiiija, 1999)
- Faith in the Morning (Wiiija, 2000)

=== Singles ===
- "Rare American Shoes" (Wiiija, 1998)
- "If I Give You a Smile" (Wiiija, 1998)
- "Don't Jump in Front of My Train" (Wiiija, 1999)
- "Happiness" (Wiiija, 2000)

=== EPs ===
- Intermission EP (Wiiija, 1999)
