= EMF (band) =

English rock band

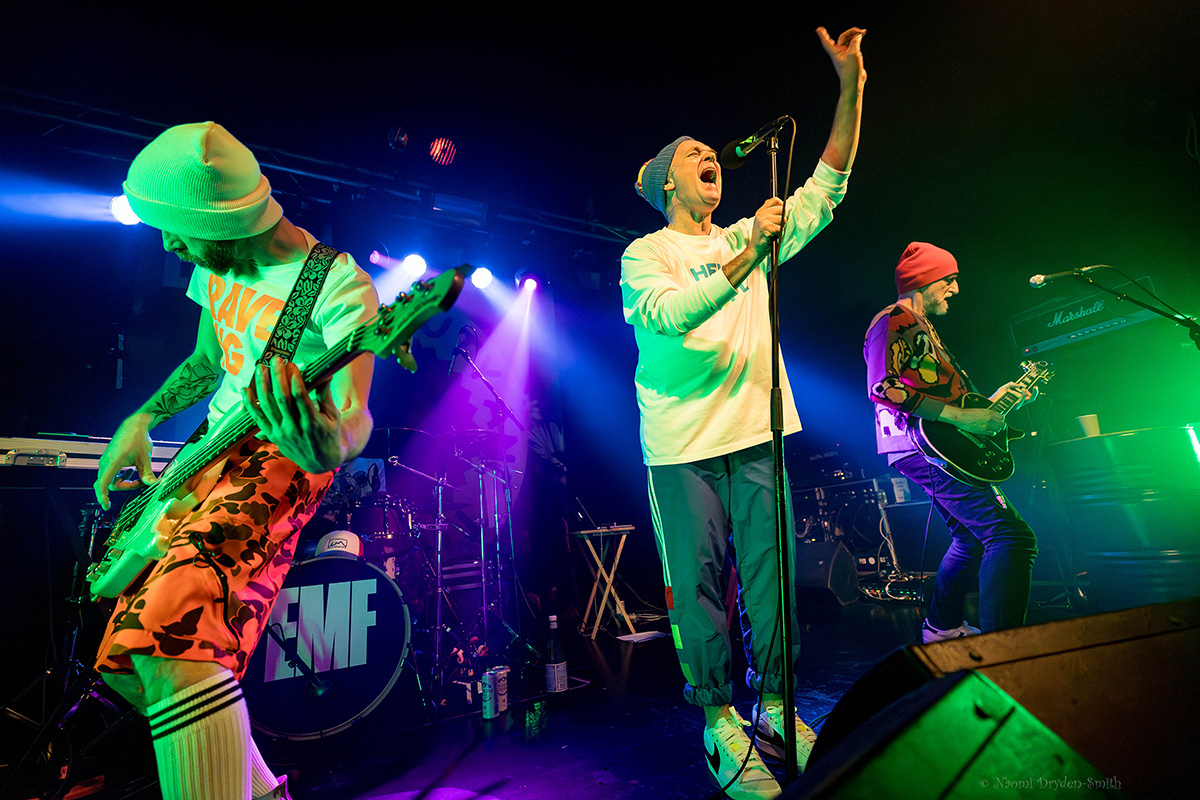
- EMF performing in 2024

Background information
- Origin: Cinderford, Gloucestershire, England
- Genres: Alternative rock, alternative dance, indie rock, dance-rock
- Years active: 1989–1997, 2001–2002, 2007–2009, 2012–present
- Label: Parlophone
- Members: James Atkin; Ian Dench; Stevey Marsh; Robin Goodridge
- Past members: Derry Brownson; Mark Decloedt; DJ Milf; Zac Foley; Jack Stephens; Tim Stephens; Phil Cleary; Richard March; Adrian Todd
- Website: www.emf-theband.com

EMF are an English alternative rock band from Cinderford, Gloucestershire, who came to prominence at the beginning of the 1990s. During their initial eight-year run, from 1989 to 1997, the band released three studio albums before a hiatus. Their first single, "Unbelievable", reached number 3 on the UK Singles Chart, and was a number 1 hit on the US Billboard Hot 100 chart. Their debut album, Schubert Dip, went to number 3 on the UK Albums Chart. In April 2022, EMF released Go Go Sapiens, their first album of new material in 27 years.

== Biography ==
=== Formation (1989) ===
All the members of the band were relatively well known in the Forest of Dean music scene before forming EMF in Cinderford in October 1989. Keyboard player Derry Brownson had formed a band called Flowerdrum but left to join bass guitarist Zac Foley, drummer Marc Decloedt, DJ Milf, and singer James Atkin as EMF. Ian Dench was the last to join, having already tasted moderate success as a guitarist for Apple Mosaic. The name EMF is an initialism of Epsom Mad Funkers, a name taken from a fan club of the band New Order in 1989.

The band's music has been classified as indie rock, dance-rock and indie dance. They toured the UK in 1990 with Stereo MCs.

=== Schubert Dip and Stigma (1990–1992) ===
In 1990, their debut single "Unbelievable" topped the charts in many countries around the world, reaching number 1 in the U.S. in July 1991. The single featured sampled utterances from comedian Andrew Dice Clay. In 1991, EMF released their debut album Schubert Dip which went to number 3 in the UK. The name was explained by songwriter Ian Dench, as "If ever I'm short of a chord sequence, I nick one from Schubert." Successful singles from the album included "I Believe", "Children", and "Lies". "Lies" included a voice sample of Mark Chapman, John Lennon's murderer. Yoko Ono, Lennon's wife, achieved an injunction, and a modified version was included in future pressings.

In 1992, EMF returned with the Unexplained EP (including a cover version of "Search and Destroy") and later Stigma, their second album. Both of these releases did poorly in the charts. The singles released were "Getting Through", "They're Here", and "It's You".

Also in 1992, EMF appeared on the Red Hot Organization's dance compilation album Red Hot + Dance, contributing "Unbelievable (The Hovering Feet Mix)". The album attempted to raise awareness and money in support of the AIDS epidemic, and all proceeds were donated to AIDS charities.

=== Cha Cha Cha and first hiatus (1995–2000) ===
EMF's third album, Cha Cha Cha, was released in 1995 and featured the singles "Perfect Day" and "Bleeding You Dry". In the same year, EMF teamed with comedians Vic Reeves and Bob Mortimer and recorded "I'm a Believer", a cover of The Monkees song. This single reached No. 3 in the UK singles chart.

Following the release of the Afro King single (which failed to do well), the band split up for the first time. However, all members of the band continued to play music. Ian Dench formed the indie rock band Whistler, which was active from 1998 to 2000. James Atkin formed the big beat trio Cooler and Derry Brownson formed the alternative rock trio LK. Zac Foley became the bass player for Carrie.

=== Reunion and second hiatus (2001–2006) ===
In 2001, EMF played a reunion gig in London. They also released a greatest hits album: Epsom Mad Funkers: The Best of EMF.

Zac Foley died on 3 January 2002 at the age of 31, due to an overdose of non-prescribed drugs. Following his death, EMF played four gigs in late 2002 before splitting again.

=== Second reunion and third hiatus (2007–2009) ===
In 2007 the band reformed to play a one-off gig at the Scala in King's Cross, London, on 18 December. Foley was replaced by Richard March, formerly of Pop Will Eat Itself and Bentley Rhythm Ace.

In 2008 EMF played the Portsmouth Festival on 9 October and supported Carter USM at Birmingham Academy and London's Brixton Academy in November that year.

In May 2009 EMF announced that due to personal issues, the band would not be doing any more shows in the near future, thus ending their second reunion.

=== Third reunion (2012–2019) ===
In 2012, they reformed to play at the inaugural festival Lakefest in Tewkesbury, alongside Levellers and Dodgy, on 18 and 19 May. The band welcomed new bassist Stevey Marsh during this show. For the first time, they performed every track from the album Schubert Dip in order to coincide with the 21st anniversary re-release. The band headlined at the Westbury Festival on 25 August 2012. In December 2012 the band played Schubert Dip and Stigma from start to finish at the Gloucester Guildhall. The show was recorded and sold as a live Blu-ray/DVD titled Videodrome: Long Live the New Flesh.

On 1 October 2016 the band headlined Indie Daze in London.

=== From Us To You, Go Go Sapiens and The Beauty and the Chaos (2020–present) ===
In 2020, the band released a career-spanning vinyl box set titled From Us to You. It contained all of the albums remastered, and a fourth disc containing previously unreleased demos and non-album tracks. On 1 April 2022, the band released an album of original material, titled Go Go Sapiens. Its first single, "Sister Sandinista", was released 1 March 2022. They also embarked on a short UK tour in early April 2022.

In January 2024, The Beauty and the Chaos, the band’s fifth studio album, was released, produced with their long time collaborator Ralph Jezzard. The first single, "Hello People" features Stephen Fry. They continued touring including a co-headline tour with Jesus Jones and dates in the US in June 2025 with Spacehog and Ecce Shnak.

On 25 August 2025, the BBC released EMF – The Unbelievable Journey, a radio special recorded by Steve Knibbs, documenting the band's early years.

Keyboardist and band co-founder Derry Brownson died from a brain tumour on 13 August 2026, aged 55.

== Members ==
- James Atkin (vocals, guitars, keyboards)
- Ian Dench (guitars, keyboards)
- Stevey Marsh (bass)
- Robin Goodridge (drums)

=== Former members ===
- Derry Brownson (keyboards, samples; died 13 August 2026)
- Zac Foley (bass; died 3 January 2002)
- Gareth Milford (DJ Milf) (DJ and turntables)
- Jack Stephens (drums)
- Tim Stephens (guitars)
- Mark Decloedt (drums)
- Richard March (bass)
- Adrian Todd (drums)

=== Later work ===
Since 2010 James Atkin has taught music at Holy Family Catholic School in Keighley, West Yorkshire and is a touring member of Bentley Rhythm Ace. As of June 2020, he has released four solo albums including Circadian Rhythms (2023), Popcorn Storm (2019) and A Country Mile (2014).

== Honours ==
On 18 March 2025, EMF received a blue plaque in their home town of Cinderford.

== Discography ==
=== Albums ===
List of studio albums, with selected chart positions
Year	Album	UK	AUS	NZ	US
1991	Schubert Dip	3	44	8	12
1992	Stigma	19	143	—	—
1995	Cha Cha Cha	30	—	—	—
2022	Go Go Sapiens	—	—	—	—
2024	The Beauty and the Chaos	—	—	—	—

=== Compilations ===
Compilations by EMF
Year	Album
2001	Epsom Mad Funkers: The Best of EMF
2020	From Us to You

=== EPs ===
EPs by EMF
Year	Title	UK	AUS	IRE
1992	Unexplained EP	18	136	16

=== Singles ===
List of singles, with selected chart positions
Title	Year	UK	AUS	BEL (FL)	GER	IRE	NLD	NZ	SWI	US	US Alt	Album
"Unbelievable"	1990	3	8	4	9	5	6	12	3	1	3	Schubert Dip
"I Believe"	1991	6	54	32	26	2	28	35	6	—	10	Schubert Dip
"Children"	1991	19	49	—	40	5	—	39	18	—	26	Schubert Dip
"Lies"	1991	28	159	—	99	18	—	—	—	18	27	Schubert Dip
"They're Here"	1992	29	195	—	—	—	—	—	—	—	27	Stigma
"It's You"	1992	23	—	—	—	—	—	—	—	—	—	Stigma
"Perfect Day"	1995	27	—	—	—	—	—	—	—	—	—	Cha Cha Cha
"Bleeding You Dry" (UK promo only)	1995	—	—	—	—	—	—	—	—	—	—	Cha Cha Cha
"I'm a Believer" (with Reeves and Mortimer)	1995	3	186	—	—	17	—	—	—	—	—	singles only
"Afro King"	1995	51	—	—	—	—	—	—	—	—	—	singles only
"Incredible"	2001	—	—	—	—	—	—	—	—	—	—	The Best of EMF: Epsom Mad Funkers
"Let's Go"	2001	—	—	—	—	—	—	—	—	—	—	The Best of EMF: Epsom Mad Funkers
"Sister Sandinista"	2022	—	—	—	—	—	—	—	—	—	—	Go Go Sapiens
"Crime of Passion"	2022	—	—	—	—	—	—	—	—	—	—	Go Go Sapiens
"Sparks and Flashes"	2022	—	—	—	—	—	—	—	—	—	—	Go Go Sapiens
"Hello People"	2023	—	—	—	—	—	—	—	—	—	—	The Beauty and the Chaos
"Reach for the Lasers"	2023		—	—	—	—	—	—	—	—	—	The Beauty and the Chaos

=== Videos ===
Videos by EMF
Year	Title
1991	Smoke the Banger (VHS)
2013	Long Live the New Flesh (Blu-ray & DVD)
