= Idol (Amanda Ghost song) =

Single by Amanda Ghost

from the album Ghost Stories
- Released: 1 March 2000
- Recorded: 1999
- Genre: Pop rock
- Length: 4:43
- Label: Kinetic; Warner Bros.
- Songwriters: Amanda Ghost; Ian Dench; Lukas Burton; Sacha Skarbek
- Producers: Lukas Burton; Sacha Skarbek; Steve Dub

Amanda Ghost singles chronology
"Idol" (2000)	"Filthy Mind" (2000)

"Idol" is a song recorded by English singer-songwriter Amanda Ghost from her debut studio album Ghost Stories (2000). In the United Kingdom it was released as the lead single from the album on 1 March 2000 by Warner Bros., while "Filthy Mind" served as the lead single in the United States.

"Idol" received positive reviews from music critics. In the United Kingdom it peaked at number sixty-three on the UK Singles Chart. In the United States the song failed to enter the Billboard Hot 100, but was successful in the Dance Club Songs chart, where it peaked at number eighteen. The song also received heavy airplay on the alternative music station, WMAD 92.1, in Madison, WI, in the late summer of 2000.

== Track listings and formats ==
- UK CD single
1. "Idol" (Album Version) – 4:43
2. "Idol" (Boy George and Kinky Roland's Trance Your Arm Mix) – 6:39
3. "Idol" (Boy George and Kinky Roland Gulub Dub) – 6:52
- UK enhanced CD single
1. "Idol" (Album Version) – 4:43
2. "Idol" (Dark Globe Remix) – 7:06
3. "Idol" (Radio Edit) – 3:24
4. "Idol" (Video)
- US CD maxi-single
1. "Idol" (Hex Hector & Jonathan Peters Radio Mix) – 4:02
2. "Idol" (Hex Hector & Jonathan Peters Club Mix) – 8:50
3. "Idol" (Boy George & Kinky Roland Trance Your Arm Mix) – 6:40
4. "Idol" (Boy George & Kinky Roland Gulub Dub) – 6:54
5. "Idol" (Hex Hector & Jonathan Peters Dub) – 9:45
6. "Idol" (Dark Globe Mix) – 7:09
7. "Idol" (Album Version) – 4:45

== Credits and personnel ==
- Amanda Ghost – vocals, songwriting
- Ian Dench - songwriting
- Lukas Burton – songwriting, producer, music programming
- Sacha Skarbek – songwriting, co-producer
- Steve Dub – co-producer
- Nick Sykes – audio engineering

== Charts ==
Chart (2000)	Peak position
UK Singles (OCC)	63
US Dance Club Songs (Billboard)	18
US Hot Dance Music/Maxi-Singles Sales (Billboard)	18
