= Schubert Dip =

Studio album by EMF
- Released: 7 May 1991
- Recorded: 1990
- Genre: Alternative dance
- Length: 44:25
- Label: Parlophone
- Producers: Pascal Gabriel; Ralph Jezzard

EMF chronology
Schubert Dip (1991)	Stigma (1992)

Singles from Schubert Dip
- 1. "Unbelievable" Released: 22 October 1990; 2. "I Believe" Released: January 1991; 3. "Children" Released: April 1991; 4. "Lies" Released: August 1991

Schubert Dip is the debut album by British rock band EMF, released on Parlophone Records on 7 May 1991. It features the worldwide hit single "Unbelievable" which reached number one on the US Billboard Hot 100. The name of the album is a pun on the name of the popular sweet sherbet dip and the 19th-century composer Franz Schubert.

== Critical reception ==
Professional ratings
Review scores
Source	Rating
AllMusic	3/5 stars
The Baltimore Sun	(favorable)
Calgary Herald	C
The Encyclopedia of Popular Music	4/5 stars
Entertainment Weekly	B−
Los Angeles Times	3/5 stars
NME	9/10
Q	4/5 stars
The Village Voice	C+

Alex Henderson of AllMusic gave the album three stars out of five, feeling that overall it was not as good as the standout single "Unbelievable": "The only song that comes close to packing the punch of 'Unbelievable' is the intoxicating 'Long Summer Days'. For the most part, Schubert Dip is a prime example of an album that is simply decent when it should have been excellent."

== Track listing ==
All songs written and composed by James Atkin, Derry Brownson, Mark Decloedt, Ian Dench & Zac Foley, except where noted.

1. "Children" – 5:15
2. "Long Summer Days" – 4:00
3. "When You're Mine" (Dench) – 3:22
4. "Travelling Not Running" (Dench) – 4:20
5. "I Believe" – 3:43
6. "Unbelievable" – 3:29
7. "Girl of an Age" – 3:56
8. "Admit It" (Dench) – 3:28
9. "Lies" (Dench) – 4:27 (4:19 on reissue)
10. "Longtime" – 4:25 (original length was 8:10, as it included "EMF" as a hidden track)
11. "EMF" (Live at the Bilson) – 3:54 (hidden track on the original, later listed separately on reissue)

Note

- The track "Lies" on the first pressings of Schubert Dip originally began with a sample of the voice of John Lennon's assassin, Mark David Chapman, reciting the first two lines of the lyrics to Lennon's "Watching the Wheels". Lennon's widow, Yoko Ono, objected to this sample and as a result all subsequent pressings of the album have omitted the sample of Chapman's voice.
- The Hungarian speech at the beginning of the track "Travelling Not Running": "Az nem lehet, hogy az ellenzéknek is ártani lehet, ezt majd a végső eredmény eldönti..." ("It is impossible to harm the oppositionist, the final result will decide it...") was spoken by János Berecz, a Hungarian Socialist Workers' Party politician at the end of the Iron Curtain era.

Sample credits

- "Unbelievable" includes samples of US comedian Andrew Dice Clay throughout the track.
- The song "Girl of an Age" contains a sample of the character Ernie from Sesame Street speaking to his friend Bert.
- The song "Longtime" contains a sample of a reading of The Hollow Men by T. S. Eliot.

== Personnel ==
EMF

- James Atkin – vocals, rhythm guitar
- Derry Brownson – keyboards, samples
- Mark Decloedt – drums
- Ian Dench – lead guitar, keyboards
- Zac Foley – bass

Additional personnel

- Gareth Milford (DJ Milf) – turntables, scratching
- Claudia Fontaine – backing vocals on "Children", "I Believe", "Girl of an Age" & "Lies"
- Sindy Finn & Laurane McIntosh – backing vocals on "Travelling Not Running"
- Mastering by George Marino at Sterling Sound, NYC

== Charts ==
=== Weekly charts ===
Weekly chart performance for Schubert Dip
Chart (1991)	Peak position
Australian Albums (ARIA)	44
Austrian Albums (Ö3 Austria)	32
Canada Top Albums/CDs (RPM)	12
Dutch Albums (Album Top 100)	83
German Albums (Offizielle Top 100)	20
New Zealand Albums (RMNZ)	8
Swedish Albums (Sverigetopplistan)	21
Swiss Albums (Schweizer Hitparade)	16
UK Albums (Official Charts Company)	3
US Billboard 200	12

=== Year-end charts ===
Annual chart performance for Schubert Dip
Chart (1991)	Position
US Billboard 200	57

== Certifications ==
Certifications for Schubert Dip
Region	Certification	Certified units/sales
Canada (Music Canada)	Platinum	100,000^{^}
United Kingdom (BPI)	Gold	100,000^{^}
United States (RIAA)	Platinum	1,000,000^{^}
^{^} Shipments figures based on certification alone.

== See also ==
- Doubt – the 1991 album by Jesus Jones, which had a similar style and performed well commercially as Schubert Dip
