= The Welfare Poets =

American hip hop group

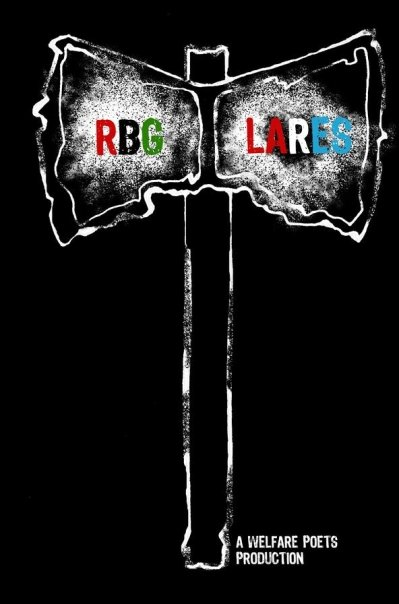

Background information
- Origin: Harlem/The Bronx, New York City, New York, U.S.
- Genres: Hip hop; Soul; Jazz; Bomba
- Years active: 1997—present
- Labels: Poor Rican Productions
- Website: The Welfare Poets Official Page

The Welfare Poets are an Afro-Caribbean hip hop group that began to come into fruition up at Cornell University in the early 1990s, but it wasn't until around 1997 when Ray Ramirez and Hector Rivera were back from college and Dahu Ala was also back home that the group began to perform locally and move towards the recording of a first album. The group has toured the United States, Puerto Rico, South America, across Europe and even part of the arctic circle (Iceland). The group plays Hip Hop with a fusion of (and separately at times) Jazz and various styles from the Caribbean, including Puerto Rico, Cuba and Jamaica. The Welfare Poets' music is complemented with lyrical content concerning social, political, economical and ecological issues which has made the group relevant over the years. The band released their first studio album "Project Blues" in June 2000 to critical acclaim and then followed up in 2005 with the genre bending and thought provoking album "Rhymes For Treason" which gave the world "Sak Pase", "Freedom", and "The Media". In 2009 they released a tour de force entitled "Warn Them", an epic 16 song opus which brought the group back to their hip hop roots (first non-band album - just beats)

== History ==
In addition to performing, The Welfare Poets have also taken an active role in community education and organizing around issues regarding social justice. They have been very critical of the American government, as well as voicing support for the Black Liberation struggle and the Puerto Rican Independence Movement. "With our music, we attempt to use culture as a tool against repression" -Ray Ramirez. Over their existence, the Welfare Poets have been active in community struggles around police brutality, environmental justice, gentrification and displacement, the death penalty and political prisoners, most notably Mumia and the Puerto Rican Political Prisoners. The Welfare Poets lyrics often deal with social issues facing Black and Brown people.

=== Project Blues Era ===
- beginning to the Summer of 2000

The album was released in June 2000. There were only 5 band members at that point, most of whom met at Cornell university. Also joining the cadre, elder Harlem native "Poppa" Dahu Ala (Poet/Musician/social activist/teacher) on trumpet and vocals, Djibril Toure on bass (rehooking up with the band from the early days at Cornell) and Mike Angel on guitar. The album fused various styles of music from a blues/jazz feeling and Caribbean rhythms. "Project Blues" brought sharply relevant lyrics and left behind it a musical foot print that hearkened back to the Last Poets, Gil Scott Heron and the like. Project Blues contains 15 songs, relentless poetry/rhyming coming from the inner city of New York (El Barrio).

=== Rhymes For Treason Era ===
- Fall of 2000 - to the Summer of 2005

The Welfare Poets second effort was released in May 2005. After "Project Blues", the Welfare Poets membership and sound grew, giving more diversity to the type of music performed and venues they could be featured at. From Hip Hop to Jazz, to many Afro-Caribbean musical forms (bomba, plena, rumba), this new sound allowed the music of the welfare poets to be heard around the world as they traveled to Latin America for the 1st time. During this time the welfare poets were also recipients of the Union Square Award.

=== Warn Them Era ===
- Fall of 2007 - Summer of 2010

The Welfare Poets sound continued to evolve over this period. The core band was changing but the Co-founder and lead Emcee/Poet of the band Ray Ramirez remained to steer the course and shape the new landscape of the collective sound. The Cadre expanded with the youngest member, emcee/producer and Harlem Puerto Rican, The Legendary MIC (M. Pacheco) joining the collective. In 2007 the band made the first trip to Europe visiting the U.K, the Netherlands and Germany.

Two compilations and fundraisers for social justice were released by the welfare poets during this time. The first of these was "Cruel and Unusual Punishment" a Hip Hop album against the death penalty featuring over 20 artists from around the country and the world, released in 2006. All proceeds from that album went to death row prisoners and to help fund various Anti-Death Penalty campaigns. The second compilation released in September 2009, "The Puerto Rican Freedom Album," was a dual CD of Puerto Rican artists used to raise funds and awareness for the current Puerto Rican political prisoners and their families.

In August 2009, 10 years since the release of their first independent album, “Project Blues,” The Welfare Poets released their third album, “Warn Them.” The WP's first purely Hip Hop album. With Rayzer and The Legendary holding down the collective vocal duties the welfare poets delivered 16 tracks that are a throwback to the days of hard drums, soulful samples and compelling messages, ushering a new age of socially responsible Hip Hop. The title track and first major video release from the album, “Warn Them,” is a 6 minute-plus tirade by Rayzer with his non-apologetic, slicing lyrics warning everyone from fake emcees, the pseudo-revolutionaries, to the individual capitalists, multinational corporations and right-wing governments that make it possible for a worldwide system of exploitation to exist.

=== Post Warn Them Era ===
The group fluctuated in size and styles over these years, and for a time was playing a but more Bomba fusing with their Hip Hop style. In December 2012/January 2013, part of the band got the chance to head to the island/nation of Iceland to facilitate a few workshops and a bunch of performances on behalf of refugees there and a few organizations doing work to assist them (No Borders Iceland and Saving Iceland). During their time in Iceland the Welfare Poets were also able to work on a video (So Alive) as well as shoot a full-length documentary on the struggle for justice of the refugees they met in there (mostly from Africa and the Middle East). The documentary entitled "No Human Being is Illegal: The Story and Struggle of the Other Hidden People of Iceland can be seen on Vimeo along with the rest of the Welfare Poets work https://vimeo.com/thewelfarepoets

== Discography ==
Studio albums

- Project Blues (2000)
- Rhymes for Treason (2005)
- Warn Them (2009)

Compilation album

- Cruel and Unusual Punishment (2007)
- The Freedom Album (2009)

== Their Symbol ==
It embodies the union of the founding members of the group. The Red, Black and Green flag represents the struggle for self- determination by African Americans here in the United States, and the Lares flag represents the independence of Puerto Rico, but more specifically a war to end Spanish colonialism and abolish slavery (El Grito de Lares). Together they stand for the unification of all oppressed people, in particular those of the African Diaspora and the Indigenous in the Americas. It also echoes a voice from our ancestors of resistance in the understanding that we must yield a weapon of justice (the two headed ax of Changó).

== Band members ==
=== Band Members by Album ===
- Ray Ramirez (Project Blues/ Rhymes for Treason/ Cruel and Unusual Punishment/ The Puerto Rican Freedom Project/ Warn Them)
- The Legendary M.I.C.(Cruel and Unusual Punishment/ The Puerto Rican Freedom Project/ Warn Them)
- Hector Rivera (Project Blues/ Rhymes for Treason/ Cruel and Unusual Punishment)
- Djibril Toure (Project Blues/ Rhymes for Treason/ Cruel and Unusual Punishment)
- Daju Ala (Project Blues/ Rhymes for Treason)
- Jamaki Knight (Rhymes for Treason/ Cruel and Unusual Punishment)
- John Maurice Restrepo - Tenor Saxophone and Flute (Cruel and Unusual Punishment/ Warn Them)
- Mike Angel (Project Blues)
- Emi Augustin (Rhymes for Reason)
- Angel Rodriguez (Rhymes for Treason)
- Fidel Paulino (Rhymes for Treason)
- Jorge Vazquez (Rhymes For Treason)
- Camilo Molina (Rhymes for Treason)
- Kaila Paulino (Warn Them)
- Elliot Cabrera (Rhymes for Treason)
