= Ghost Stories (Amanda Ghost album) =

Studio album by Amanda Ghost
- Released: 22 August 2000
- Recorded: 1999–2000
- Genre: Alternative; electronica; trip hop
- Length: 42:14
- Label: Warner Bros.
- Producer: Lukas Burton; Paul Staveley O'Duffy

Amanda Ghost chronology
Ghost Stories (2000)	Blood on the Line (2008)

Singles from Ghost Stories
- 1. "Idol" Released: March 2000; 2. "Filthy Mind" Released: 30 May 2000; 3. "Glory Girl" Released: 14 August 2000; 4. "Silver Lining" Released: May 2001

Ghost Stories is the debut studio album by English singer-songwriter Amanda Ghost. It was released on 22 August 2000 by Warner Bros. Records. In the United States, it was released on 12 September 2000. Ghost began working on the album after she got signed to Warner Bros. by A&R executive Andrew Wickham. He offered her a record deal after listening to a CD demo of hers left with him by her manager Terry Slater.

Ghost worked with Lukas Burton and Paul Staveley O'Duffy on the album while writing all the songs. Musically, Ghost Stories is predominantly an alternative rock album influenced by electronica and trip hop. It also incorporates elements of other genres, such as trance, breakbeat and classical music. Ghost Stories received generally positive reviews from music critics. However, it noted only a small commercial success and failed to enter the Billboard 200.

Four singles were released from the album with "Idol" and "Filthy Mind" becoming top-twenty hits on the Billboard Dance Club Songs chart. "Glory Girl" managed to chart at number 90 on the UK Singles Chart and "Silver Lining" peaked inside the Adult Pop Songs chart.

== Background ==
A cover of Prince's song "The Cross" was intended to be on the album. However, it was later omitted from the release.

== Critical reception ==
Professional ratings
Review scores
Source	Rating
AllMusic	3/5 stars

Bryan Buss from AllMusic gave the album three out of five stars. He praised Ghost's vocals for being "confessional without being self-pitying, strong while still being warm, and confrontational while simultaneously asking for compassion". He added that Ghost Stories is "a solid, confident debut that will be difficult to follow up". Greil Marcus wrote in his column "Real Life Rock Top Ten" that Ghost sounds "like she's singing from the basement of a nightclub long after whoever locked up thought it was empty - but then she changes her clothes and gets all wistful instead". Kevin Oliver, writing for PopMatters, stated "she manages to sound convincing, if a bit unoriginal," likening her music to that of Alanis Morissette, PJ Harvey, and Natalie Merchant.

== Track listing ==
No.	Title	Writer(s)	Producer(s)	Length
1.	"Filthy Mind"	Amanda Ghost; Ian Dench; Lukas Burton	Burton	3:57
2.	"Idol"	Ghost; Dench; Burton; Sacha Skarbek	Burton; Skarbek^{[a]}; Steve Dub^{[a]}	4:43
3.	"Glory Girl"	Ghost; Dench; Burton; Skarbek	Burton; Paul Staveley O'Duffy	4:25
4.	"The Wrong Man"	Ghost; Dench; Burton; Skarbek	Burton; Skarbek^{[a]}; Dub^{[a]}	4:14
5.	"Cellophane"	Ghost; Dench; Burton; Skarbek	Burton	3:36
6.	"Blind Man"	Ghost; Skarbek	O'Duffy	3:54
7.	"Silver Lining"	Ghost; Simeon Bowring	Burton; O'Duffy	5:12
8.	"Empty"	Ghost; Dench; Burton; Skarbek	Burton	3:39
9.	"A Child Believes"	Ghost; John Themis	O'Duffy	4:00
10.	"Numb"	Ghost; Dench; Skarbek	Burton; O'Duffy	4:34
Total length:				42:14

Notes

- ^{^a} signifies an additional producer

== Credits and personnel ==
- Amanda Ghost – vocals
- Zee Asha – background vocals
- Angela Dust – background vocals
- Linda Duggan – background vocals
- Mary Pearce – background vocals
- John Fortis – bass
- Segs Jennings – bass
- Andy Gangadeen – drums
- Steve 'Pub' Jones – drums
- Ian Dench – guitar
- John Themis – guitar, background vocals
- Sacha Skarbek – keyboards
- Wil Malone – strings
- DJ Biznizz – scratches

Credits adapted from the album's liner notes.

== Release history ==
Region	Date	Format	Label	Ref.
United Kingdom	22 August 2000	CD	Warner Bros.	
United States	12 September 2000	CD	Warner Bros.	
