= Filthy Mind =

Single by Amanda Ghost

from the album Ghost Stories
- Released: 30 May 2000
- Recorded: 1999
- Genre: Trance
- Length: 3:57
- Label: Kinetic; Warner Bros.
- Songwriters: Amanda Ghost, Lukas Burton
- Producers: Lukas Burton; Amanda Ghost

Amanda Ghost singles chronology
"Idol" (2000)	"Filthy Mind" (2000)	"Glory Girl" (2000)

"Filthy Mind" is a song recorded by English singer-songwriter Amanda Ghost from her debut studio album Ghost Stories (2000). In the United States, it was released as the lead single from the album on 30 May 2000 by Warner Bros., with "Idol" being the lead single in the United Kingdom. Written and produced by Ghost and Lukas Burton, "Filthy Mind" is an electronic dance song with elements of trance and techno music.

"Filthy Mind" received positive reviews from music critics. In the United States, the song failed to enter the Billboard Hot 100, but was successful in the Dance Club Songs chart where it peaked at number five. The song also received heavy airplay on the alternative music station, WMAD 92.1, in Madison, WI, reaching #1 on their charts for several weeks in August 2000.

The accompanying music video for the "Filthy Mind" was directed by Sean Ellis. The song was featured in films such as Valentine (2001), 40 Days and 40 Nights (2002), and the television series Queer as Folk.

== Track listings and formats ==
- CD single
1. "Filthy Mind" – 3:57
2. "Filthy Mind" (Wicked Child Mix) – 4:21
3. "Filthy Mind" (Peter Rauhofer Club Mix) – 9:44
4. "Filthy Mind" (Mount Rushmore Extended Mix) – 6:10
5. "Filthy Mind" (Boy George & Kinky Roland Trancesexual Mix) – 6:25
6. "Filthy Mind" (Peter Rauhofer Dub Mix) – 8:33
7. "Filthy Mind" (Video)

== Credits and personnel ==
- Amanda Ghost – vocals, songwriting, producer
- Lukas Burton – producer, music programming
- Nick Sykes – audio engineering

== Charts ==
Chart (2000)	Peak position
US Dance Club Songs (Billboard)	5
US Hot Dance Music/Maxi-Singles Sales (Billboard)	43

== Release history ==
Region	Date	Format
United States	30 May 2000	CD single
United States	6 June 2000	12"
