= Perfect Day (EMF song) =

1995 single by EMF

Single by EMF

from the album Cha Cha Cha
- B-side: "Angel"; "I Won't Give in to You"; "Kill for You" (Lo-Fi mix)
- Released: 13 February 1995
- Label: EMI
- Songwriter: EMF
- Producer: Jonny $

EMF singles chronology
"It's You" (1992)	"Perfect Day" (1995)	"Bleeding You Dry" (1995)

"Perfect Day" is a song by British band EMF from their third studio album, Cha Cha Cha (1995). It was written by the band and produced by Jonny $. The single was released in February 1995 by EMI Records and reached number 27 on the UK Singles Chart.

== Critical reception ==
Pan-European magazine Music & Media wrote, "Bulldozed by so many newcomers, EMF has luckily found the U-turn on Amnesia Avenue. Their new elan is justified by a heavy bass riff, a pulse beat, flute and an unbelievably good chorus." Tony Cross from Smash Hits gave "Perfect Day" four out of five, writing, "What madness is this? Oh, hang on, it's only for the first ten seconds that "the mef" go doo-lally. Then James comes along and calms it all down with his posh-bloke-with-a-cob-on lyrics that let you know the spoiled brats with attitude are back, after four hit-free years, with a great record. Wild guitar battles with synth and flute (yes, FLUTE!) in a pop blender that'll get you shaking your buns till Easter."

== Music video ==
The music video was shot in Florida and shows the band roaming around doing different things. It also shows random shots of locals and also shows the band posing as locals.

== Track listings ==
- CD1
1. "Perfect Day" (album version)
2. "Angel"
3. "I Won't Give in to You"
4. "Kill for You" (Lo-Fi mix)
- CD2
1. "Perfect Day" (Perfect mix)
2. "Perfect Day" (Chris and James Epic Adventure)
3. "Perfect Day" (Black One remix)
4. "Perfect Day" (Toytown mix)

== Charts ==
Chart (1995)	Peak position
UK Singles (OCC)	27
