= Unbelievable (EMF song) =

1990 single by EMF

- Standard release

Single by EMF

from the album Schubert Dip
- B-side: "EMF" (live at The Bilson)
- Released: 22 October 1990 (UK)
- Genre: Alternative rock; dance-rock
- Length: 3:30
- Label: Parlophone
- Songwriter: EMF
- Producer: Ralph Jezzard

EMF singles chronology
"Unbelievable" (1990)	"I Believe" (1991)

Music video
- "Unbelievable" on YouTube

"Unbelievable" is a song written and performed by British band EMF, originally appearing on their debut album, Schubert Dip (1991). It was released as a single in the UK in October 1990 by Parlophone, peaking at number three on the UK Singles Chart on 1 December 1990. It was the 30th-best-selling single of 1990 in the UK, and a top-10 hit also in Belgium, Germany, Ireland, Luxembourg, the Netherlands, Norway, Spain and Sweden. In the United States, "Unbelievable" hit number one on the Billboard Hot 100 and Cash Box Top 100 in 1991. The song was produced by Ralph Jezzard, and contains samples of US comedian Andrew Dice Clay and performance poet Gylan Kain. Its accompanying music video was directed by Josh Taft, depicting the band performing onstage.

== Background and release ==
Ian Dench, the band's guitarist and primary songwriter, has stated that the melody of the song came into his head as he was riding his bicycle while thinking of a recent girlfriend who had dumped him. Dench had learned to play classical guitar and also loved the blues. The guitar riff in the song goes from blues mode to flamenco mode, "like the two conflicting sides of his life", as he said in an interview with The Guardian. Singer James Atkin had suggested incorporating influences from Chicago house and Detroit techno, but Dench went for crossover indie/dance music.

The band made a four-track demo and were invited to London by the record labels. Instead the band suggested that label representatives witness the band perform live in the Forest of Dean. Staff from Virgin, Island and EMI wanted to sign them, and EMI won.

The "Oh!" sample comes from a recording of US comedian Andrew Dice Clay, released on Def Jam. The band therefore needed to speak to the Def Jam office in order to clear the sample. They were flown to Los Angeles for a meeting with EMI. During the trip, Dench happened to see Rick Rubin, founder of Def Jam, in a bar. Dench spoke to Rubin about clearing the sample, to which Rubin responded, “Fax my office in the morning.” He cleared the sample for free.

Contrary to repeated claims, including from the band themselves in the liner notes and elsewhere, the chopped-up phrase, "What the... WAS that?" – featured prominently in the chorus and throughout – was not sampled from a Black Panther rally speech, but rather a syncopated section of the spoken word song "Silly Shit" by Gylan Kain from his 1970 album The Blue Guerrilla.

"Unbelievable" was released on 22 October 1990 as the first single from the band's debut album Schubert Dip.

The band drew inspiration from American hip-hop for their fashion style, using their first advance to buy puffer jackets like those worn by members of East 17.

== Critical reception ==
In 2018, Bill Lamb from About.com noted that the song "mixed intoxicating rhythms, sweet high vocals from lead singer James Atkin, and rousing shouts to storm to the top of the pop charts." In his review of Schubert Dip, AllMusic editor Alex Henderson described the song as "so insanely infectious", remarking its "dizzying infectiousness". Upon the release, J.D. Considine from The Baltimore Sun felt the group's material appeals as much to the brain as the body, so that songs such as "Unbelievable" "end up danceable, hummable, and utterly irresistible." Larry Flick from Billboard magazine declared it as an "insinuating, Manchester-influenced rave. Scratchy, neopsychedelic guitar riffs nicely contrast track's hip hop groove, promising extensive exposure here at both club and radio levels."

John Earls of Classic Pop called it "mighty". Annette Petruso from The Michigan Daily stated that the boys from the Forest of Dean "have created an undeniably perfect pop single with the ultra-simple, ultra-catchy and ultra-overplayed "Unbelievable"." Andrew Collins from NME complimented it as a "special record", writing, "It's their first, and it's crunchier than the breakfast cereal Start. Sex-flavoured bass, hoppity drums, unfettered guitar, and a shouting sample that might be stupid old Andrew Dice Clay for all I know — yes, it's got the lot. Drenched in all the same juices that make PWEI so cool, it even sounds like five people were involved in its construction. I believe."

== Chart performance ==
"Unbelievable" entered the top 10 in Belgium, Germany, Ireland, Luxembourg, the Netherlands, Norway, Spain, Sweden, Switzerland, and the United Kingdom. In the UK, it peaked at number three on the UK Singles Chart during its fifth week, spending two weeks at that position. The single was also a top-10 hit on the Eurochart Hot 100, peaking at number eight in December 1990. Outside Europe, "Unbelievable" was a top-20 hit in New Zealand while entering the top 10 in Australia. In the United States, the song appeared on four different Billboard charts, peaking at number one on the Hot 100, number nine on the Dance Club Play chart, number five on the 12-inch Singles Sales chart and number three on the Modern Rock Tracks chart. It also reached number one on the Cash Box Top 100. In Canada, "Unbelievable" reached number four on the RPM 100 Hit Tracks chart and number three on the RPM Dance chart. In West Asia, it became a top-20 hit in Israel, peaking at number 14 on 23 December 1990. The single earned a gold record in Australia, Canada and the US, as well as a silver record in the UK.

== Music video ==
A music video was produced to promote the single, directed by American music video director Josh Taft. It features the band performing onstage and received heavy rotation on MTV Europe in February 1991.

== Impact and legacy ==
"Unbelievable" was awarded one of BMI's Pop Awards in 1992, honoring the songwriters, composers and music publishers of the song. The song was ranked No. 31 on VH1's "100 Greatest One-Hit Wonders" in 2002 and No. 98 on VH1's "100 Greatest Songs of the 90s" in 2007. In 2003, English music journalist Paul Morley included it in his list of "Greatest Pop Single of All Time". In 2011, Australian music channel Max included it in their list of "1000 Greatest Songs of All Time". In July 2014, Rolling Stone magazine listed "Unbelievable" at number 12 in their "20 Biggest Songs of the Summer: The 1990s" list. In 2020, Cleveland.com listed it at number 41 in their ranking of the best Billboard Hot 100 No. 1 song of the 1990s. In 2024, Billboard magazine ranked it number 52 in their "The 100 Greatest Jock Jams of All Time", naming it "Andrew Dice Clay’s greatest contribution to polite society."

A cover of the song with rewritten lyrics sung by Keely Hawkes was featured in the 2009 straight-to-DVD film Barbie and the Three Musketeers.

== In popular culture ==
From 2005 until 2006, a commercial for Kraft Natural Cheese Crumbles rewrote the chorus as "They're Crumbelievable!".

In 2009, the song was used in a campaign title "Unbelievable Song"(by Wieden + Kennedy) for the soda Coca-Cola Zero.

In 2024, the song was used in a TV spot for the restaurant Applebee's to promote their low-price menu items such as $0.50 mozzarella sticks and their Irresist-A-Bowls.

In 2026, a sample of the song can be heard in a commercial for ICOTYDEwhere it features a doctor reciting lines while a unicorn casually passes a window.

== Track listings ==
- UK 7-inch (R 6273)
1. "Unbelievable" – 3:30
2. "EMF" (live at The Bilson) – 3:53
- UK CD (CDR 6273)
1. "Unbelievable" – 3:30
2. "Unbelievable" (The Cin City Sex Mix) – 5:14
3. "EMF" (live at The Bilson) – 3:53
- US CD (E2-56210)
1. "Unbelievable" (single version) – 3:30
2. "Unbelievable" (Cin City Sex Mix) – 5:14
3. "Unbelievable" (Boot Lane Mix) – 6:20
4. "Unbelievable" (House Mix) – 4:26
5. "Unbelievable" (Hip Hop Mix) – 4:10
6. "EMF" (live at The Bilson) – 3:53

== Charts ==
=== Weekly charts ===
Chart (1990–1991)	Peak position
Australia (ARIA)	8
Austria (Ö3 Austria Top 40)	20
Belgium (Ultratop 50 Flanders)	4
Canada Top Singles (RPM)	4
Canada Dance/Urban (RPM)	3
Europe (Eurochart Hot 100)	8
Finland (Suomen virallinen lista)	21
Germany (GfK)	9
Ireland (IRMA)	5
Israel (Israeli Singles Chart)	14
Luxembourg (Radio Luxembourg)	2
Netherlands (Dutch Top 40)	6
Netherlands (Single Top 100)	6
New Zealand (Recorded Music NZ)	12
Norway (VG-lista)	8
Quebec (ADISQ)	10
Spain (AFYVE)	6
Sweden (Sverigetopplistan)	9
Switzerland (Schweizer Hitparade)	3
UK Singles (Official Charts)	3
UK Airplay (Music Week)	22
US Billboard Hot 100	1
US 12-inch Singles Sales (Billboard)	5
US Dance Club Play (Billboard)	9
US Modern Rock Tracks (Billboard)	3
US Cash Box Top 100	1

=== Year-end charts ===
Chart (1990)	Position
UK Singles (OCC)	30

Chart (1991)	Position
Australia (ARIA)	35
Belgium (Ultratop 50 Flanders)	52
Canada Top Singles (RPM)	47
Canada Dance/Urban (RPM)	10
Europe (Eurochart Hot 100)	44
Germany (Media Control)	43
New Zealand (RIANZ)	15
Sweden (Topplistan)	50
Switzerland (Schweizer Hitparade)	16
US Billboard Hot 100	6
US 12-inch Singles Sales (Billboard)	28
US Modern Rock Tracks (Billboard)	19
US Cash Box Top 100	5

== Certifications ==
Region	Certification	Certified units/sales
Australia (ARIA)	Gold	35,000^{^}
Canada (Music Canada)	Gold	50,000^{^}
United Kingdom (BPI)	Silver	200,000^{^}
United States (RIAA)	Gold	500,000^{^}
^{^} Shipments figures based on certification alone.

== Release history ==
Region	Date	Format(s)	Label(s)	Ref.
United Kingdom	22 October 1990	7-inch vinyl; 12-inch vinyl; CD; cassette	Parlophone	
United Kingdom	29 October 1990	12-inch remix vinyl	Parlophone	
United States	3 November 1990	—N/a	EMI USA	
Australia	21 January 1991	7-inch vinyl; cassette	Parlophone; EMI	
Australia	11 March 1991	12-inch vinyl	Parlophone; EMI	
Japan	19 April 1991	Mini-CD	EMI	

== See also ==
- List of Billboard Hot 100 number-one singles of 1991
- List of Cash Box Top 100 number-one singles of 1991
