= Cha Cha Cha (album) =

Studio album by EMF
- Released: 2 March 1995
- Recorded: 1994
- Genre: Alternative rock
- Length: 57:27
- Label: Parlophone
- Producer: Jonny Dollar

EMF chronology
Stigma (1992)	Cha Cha Cha (1995)	Epsom Mad Funkers: The Best of EMF (2001)

Professional ratings
Review scores
Source	Rating
AllMusic	2/5 stars
The Encyclopedia of Popular Music	3/5 stars
Smash Hits	5/5 stars

Cha Cha Cha is the third album by English rock band EMF, released in 1995 under the EMI label.

== Critical reception ==
Trouser Press wrote that "flashes of EMF’s early techno-pop sound surface in 'Bleeding You Dry', by far the most listenable track on 1995’s Cha Cha Cha. Almost every other cut on this would-be comeback, however, finds the band groping-unsuccessfully — for some new musical direction."

== Track listing ==
1. "Perfect Day" – 3:35
2. "La Plage" – 3:44
3. "The Day I Was Born" – 3:50
4. "Secrets" – 3:56
5. "Shining" – 6:10
6. "Bring Me Down" – 4:20
7. "Skin" – 4:22
8. "Slouch" – 2:17
9. "Bleeding You Dry" – 5:20
10. "Patterns" – 3:37
11. "When Will You Come" – 3:39
12. "West of the Cox" – 4:08
13. "Ballad O' the Bishop" – 4:09
14. "Glass Smash Jack" – 4:20

Japanese bonus track

15. "Angel"
