= The Last Poets =

African-American political poetry groups

- Origin: Harlem, New York, United States
- Genre: Political poetry
- Years active: 1968–present
- Labels: Mercury; PolyGram; Celluloid; Casablanca; Douglas Records; Mouth Almighty; Innerhythmic
- Members: Abiodun Oyewole; Umar Bin Hassan; Baba Donn Babatunde; Jamal Abdus Sabur
- Past members: Jalal Mansur Nuriddin; Suliaman El-Hadi; Nilaja Obabi; Abu Mustapha; Kenyatte Abdur-Rahman

The Last Poets is a poetry collective and musical group that arose in the late 1960s as part of the African-American civil rights movement and black nationalism. The name was inspired by revolutionary South African poet Keorapetse Kgositsile who believed he was in the last era of poetry before guns took over.

The group originally comprised Jalaluddin Mansur Nuriddin, Umar Bin Hassan and Abiodun Oyewole. Lineup changes and departures led to offshoots, including The Original Last Poets composed of Oyewole, Gylan Kain and David Nelson. Critic Jason Ankeny wrote: "With their politically charged raps, taut rhythms, and dedication to raising African-American consciousness, the Last Poets almost single-handedly laid the groundwork for the emergence of hip-hop." The British music magazine NME stated, "Serious spokesmen like Gil Scott-Heron, The Last Poets, and later Gary Byrd, paved the way for the many socially committed Black [emcees] a decade later."

== History ==
=== Origins and 1970s ===
Jalal Mansur Nuriddin a.k.a. Alafia Pudim (born Lawrence Padilla), Umar Bin Hassan, and Abiodun Oyewole, along with poet Suliaman El-Hadi and percussionist Nilaja Obabi (Raymond "Mac" Hurrey), are generally considered the best-known members of the various lineups. Jalal, Abiodun, Umar, and Nilaja appeared on the group's 1970 self-titled debut LP and follow-up This Is Madness featured all but Abiodun, due to his incarceration for political activism. On the third album Chastisement a third poet, Suliaman El-Hadi, was added, then Nilija left and the African rhythms began to be replaced by jazzier backgrounds. The Jalal-Suliaman version of the group made six albums together but recorded only sporadically without much promotion after 1977.

The Original Last Poets were formed on May 19, 1968, the birthday of Malcolm X, at Mount Morris Park (now known as Marcus Garvey Park) in East Harlem, New York City. The original group consisted of Gylan Kain, David Nelson and Abiodun Oyewole. The group coalesced via a 1969 Harlem writers' workshop known as East Wind. On October 24 that year, the group performed on pioneering New York television program Soul!. The Last Poets contributed "Wake Up, Niggers" to the soundtrack of Performance, a 1970 film featuring Mick Jagger.

When Nelson left, he was replaced by Felipe Luciano, who would later leave to establish the Young Lords. When Kain and Nelson began to pursue other interests (theater and ministry respectively), Abiodun Oyewole "recruited" Alafia Pudim (later known as Jalaluddin Mansur) and Umar bin Hassan. In an effort to coerce Kain into allowing the new group to exploit the band's name exclusively, Jalal Nuriddin and other members of the spin-off group physically assaulted founding member Gylan Kain with hammers on a New York City street threatening to murder Kain's wife and children. According to several documentaries and the personal accounts of events by the parties involved, Kain neither retaliated nor gave in to the attackers' demands. After the assault, Kain was left unconscious in the street. Following a legal battle between the two groups concerning ownership of the band's name, The Right On album was released under the group name The Original Last Poets to simultaneously establish the founding members' primacy and distance themselves from the other group of the same name. Following the release of the refigured Last Poets first album eponymously titled The Last Poets, founding members Kain and Nelson got together with Luciano and recorded their only album Right On in 1968 (without Oyewole). This album was later the basis of a documentary film of the same name that finally distributed in 1971.

In 1972, they appeared on Black Forum Records album Black Spirits - Festival Of New Black Poets In America with "And See Her Image In The River" and "Song of Ditla, part II", recorded live at the Apollo Theatre, Harlem, New York. A book of the same name was published by Random House (1972 - ISBN 9780394476209).

Having reached US Top 10 chart success with its debut album, the Last Poets went on to release the follow-up, This Is Madness, without then-incarcerated Abiodun Oyewole. The album featured more politically charged poetry that resulted in the group being listed under the counter-intelligence program COINTELPRO during the Richard Nixon administration. Hassan left the group following This Is Madness to be replaced by Suliaman El-Hadi in time for Chastisment (1972). The album introduced a sound the group called "jazzoetry", leaving behind the spare percussion of the previous albums in favor of a blending of jazz and funk instrumentation with poetry. The music further developed into free-jazz–poetry with Hassan's brief return on Blue Thumb album At Last (1973), as yet the only Last Poets release still unavailable on CD.

The remainder of the 1970s saw a decline in the group's popularity in America, although they became quite popular in Europe.

=== 1980s and 1990s ===
In the 1980s and beyond, however, the group gained renown with the rise of hip-hop music, often being name-checked as grandfathers and founders of the new movement, often citing the Jalaluddin solo project Hustler's Convention (1973) as their inspiration. Because of this the band was interviewed in the 1986 cult documentary Big Fun In The Big Town. Nuriddin and El-Hadi worked on several projects under the Last Poets name, working with bassist and producer Bill Laswell, including 1984's Oh My People and 1988's Freedom Express, and recording the final El-Hadi–Nuriddin collaboration, Scatterrap/Home, in 1994. The group, El-Hadi, Nuriddin and Hassan, also made a guest appearance in John Singleton's 1993 film Poetic Justice. Prominent Attorney Gregory J Reed reunited Original Poets in NY the same day of Nelson Mandela was released from prison after 27 years and recorded "Poets Live" in Detroit's Orchestra Hall, and produced "The Return of the Original Last Poets Docudrama" Kain, Luciano, Oyewole and Nelson after 20 years in 1990.

Suliaman El-Hadi died in October 1995. Oyewole and Hassan began recording separately under the same name, releasing Holy Terror in 1995 (re-released on Innerhythmic in 2004) and Time Has Come in 1997. Meanwhile, Nuriddin released the solo CD's On The One (1996), The Fruits of Rap (1997) and Science Friction (2004) under the abbreviated name "Jalal."

=== 21st century ===
In 2004, Jalal Mansur Nuriddin, a.k.a. Alafia Pudim, a.k.a. Lightning Rod (The Hustlers Convention 1973), collaborated with the UK-based poet Mark T. Watson (a.k.a. Malik Al Nasir) writing the foreword to Watson's debut poetry collection, Ordinary Guy, published in December 2004 by the Liverpool-based publisher Fore-Word Press. Jalal's foreword was written in rhyme, and was recorded for a collaborative album "Rhythms of the Diaspora (Vol. 1 & 2 - Unreleased) by Malik Al Nasir's band, Malik & the O.G's featuring Gil Scott-Heron, percussionist Larry McDonald, drummers Rod Youngs and Swiss Chris, New York dub poet Ras Tesfa, and a host of young rappers from New York and Washington, D.C. Produced by Malik Al Nasir, and Swiss Chris, the albums Rhythms of the Diaspora; Vol. 1 & 2 are the first of their kind to unite these pioneers of poetry and hip hop with each other.

In 2005, the Last Poets found fame again refreshed through a collaboration where the trio (Umar Bin Hassan) was featured with hip-hop artist Common on the Kanye West-produced song "The Corner," as well as (Abiodun Oyewole) with the Wu-Tang Clan-affiliated political hip-hop group Black Market Militia on the song "The Final Call," stretching overseas to the UK on songs "Organic Liquorice (Natural Woman)", "Voodoocore", and "A Name" with Shaka Amazulu the 7th. The group is also featured on the Nas album Untitled, on the songs "You Can't Stop Us Now" and "Project Roach." Individual members of the group also collaborated with DST on a remake of "Mean Machine", Public Enemy on a remake of "White Man's Got A God Complex" and with Bristol-based post-punk band the Pop Group.

In 2010, Abiodun Oyowele was among the artists featured on the Welfare Poets' produced Cruel And Unusual Punishment, a CD compilation that was made in protest of the death penalty, which also featured some several current positive hip hop artists.

In 2011, Abiodun Oyewole and Umar Bin Hassan performed at The Jazz Cafe in London, in a tribute concert to the late Scott-Heron and all the former Last Poets. In 2014, Nuriddin performed at the same venue with Jazz Warriors, the first live performance in 40 years of the "Hustlers Convention". The event was produced by Fore-Word Press and featured Liverpool poet Malik Al Nasir with his band Malik & the O.G's featuring Cleveland Watkiss, Orphy Robinson and Tony Remy. The event was filmed as part of a documentary on the "Hustlers Convention" by Manchester film maker Mike Todd and Riverhorse Communications. The executive producer was Public Enemy's Chuck D. As part of the event Charly Records re-issued a special limited edition of the vinyl version of Hustlers Convention to celebrate their 40th anniversary. The event was MC'd by poet Lemn Sissay and the DJ was Shiftless Shuffle's Perry Louis.

In 2016, The Last Poets (World Editions, UK), was published. The novel, written by Christine Otten , was originally published in Dutch in 2011, and has now been translated by Jonathan Reeder for English readers.

In May 2018, The Last Poets released Understand What Black Is, their first album since 1997. The album featured tributes to late artists Prince and Biggie Smalls.

In August 2022, numerous samples from The Last Poet "Mean Machine" were used in JID's "Raydar" In reference to the poet's lines about weapons, peace, and harmony.

== Discography ==
=== Albums ===
- The Last Poets (1970) - Re-issue Celluloid Records (1984) (Cat No: CELL-6101)

(Poets: Abiodun Oyewole, Alafia Pudim (a.k.a. Jalaluddin Mansur Nuriddin), & Umar Bin Hassan/Percussionist: Raymond "Nilaja/Obabi" Hurrey)

- The Original Last Poets - Right On Original Soundtrack (1971) Juggernaut Records

(Poets: Felipe Luciano, David Nelson & Gylan Kain)

- This Is Madness (March 1971) Douglas Records Douglas-7 (Cat No: Z-30583)

(Poets: Alafia Pudim (a.k.a. Jalaluddin Mansur Nuriddin) & Umar Bin Hassan/Percussionist: Raymond "Nilaja/Obabi" Hurrey)

- Black Spirits - Festival Of New Black Poets In America (1972) Black Forum Records B-456-L

(Poets: Felipe Luciano, David Nelson & Gylan Kain [spelt Cain])

- Chastisement (July 1972)

(Poets: Alafia Pudim (a.k.a. Jalaluddin Mansur Nuriddin) & Suliaman El-Hadi/Percussionist: Raymond "Nilaja/Obabi" Hurrey)

- Hustlers Convention (1973)

(Poet: Lightnin' Rod (a.k.a. Alafia Pudim & Jalaluddin Mansur Nuriddin)

- At Last (1973)

(Poets: Jalaluddin Mansur Nuriddin, Suliaman El-Hadi, & Umar Bin Hassan)

- Jazzoetry (Compilation) album (1976) Douglas Records Casablanca Records (Cat No: ADLP 6001. - Spoet Publishing - BMI)

(Poets: Jalaluddin Mansur Nuriddin, Abiodun Oyewole & Umar Bin Hassan)

- Delights of the Garden (1977) Douglas Records

(Poets: Jalaluddin Mansur Nuriddin & Suliaman El-Hadi)

- Oh My People (1984)

(Poets: Suliaman El-Hadi & Jalaluddin Mansur Nuriddin)

- This Is Madness (Re-issue) (1984) (Celluloid Records)

(Poets: Alafia Pudim, Umar Bin Hassen; Percussion: Raymond "Nilija/Obabi" Hurrey)

- Freedom Express (1988)

(Poets: Suliaman El-Hadi & Jalaluddin Mansur Nuriddin)

- Retro Fit (Compilation) (1992)

(Poets: Suliaman & Jalaluddin Mansur Nuriddin)

- Holy Terror (1993)

(Poets: Abiodun Oyewole & Umar Bin Hassan)

- Scatterap / Home (1994)

(Poets: Suliaman El-Hadi & Jalaluddin Mansur Nuriddin)

- Time Has Come (Mouth Almighty Records 1997)

(Poets: Abiodun Oyewole & Umar Bin Hassan)

- The Prime Time Rhyme of The Last Poets - Best Of Vol. 1 (1999) On The One Records (Cat No: SPOA-21LP)

(Poets: Suliaman El-Hadi & Jalaluddin Mansur Nuriddin)

- The Prime Time Rhyme of The Last Poets - Best Of Vol. 2 (1999) On The One Records

(Poets: Suliaman El-Hadi & Jalaluddin Mansur Nuriddin)

- Understand What Black Is (2018)

(Poets: Abiodun Oyewole & Umar Bin Hassan)

- Transcending Toxic Times (2019)

(Poets: Abiodun Oyewole & Umar Bin Hassan & Baba Donn Babatunde)

=== Appearances ===
- American Sahara - SmCity, "Dream Cemetery" (2013)
- Hip-Hop samit sharma Docktrine - The Official Boondocks Mixtape (2006)
- Rhythms of the Diaspora Vol. 1 & 2 Featuring Gil Scott-Heron & The Last Poets (album)|Rhythms of the Diaspora Vol. 1 & 2 (2015) Mentis Records.

(Poets: Jalaluddin Mansur Nuriddin, Malik Al Nasir, Ras Tesfa, Gil Scott-Heron)

- The Corner - Common, "Be" (2005)
- Project Roach & You Can't Stop Us Now - Nas, "Untitled" (2008)
- Made in Amerikkka - Reuniting The Last Poets (2008)
- Poetic Justice (1993)
- Excursions - A Tribe Called Quest, "The Low End Theory" (1991)
- Discipline 99 Pt. 0 - Quasimoto, "The Unseen" (2000)
- Return of The Last Poets 1990 [Original Founding members, Kain, Lupe, Abiodune and Nelson]

== Bibliography ==
- Vibes from the Scribes - Pluto Press, 1985
- On a Mission - Henry Holt Pub., 1996

== Filmography ==
- 1970 - "Tamu". Directed by Larry Clark. - "Two Little Boys" included in soundtrack. Los Angeles, California, 1970
- 1971 - Right On!: Poetry on Film (Original Last Poets). Directed by Herbert Danska.
- 1990 - The Return of Original members of Last Poets Docudrama after 20 years of separation producer atty Gregory J Reed
- 2008 - The Last Poets, made in Amerikkka (réalisation: Claude Santiago. France, 2008. www.lahuit.com).
- 2004 - Word-Up!: From Ghetto to Mecca Jalal Mansur Nuriddin, Gil Scott-Heron, Malik Al Nasir, Benjamin Zephaniah. Directed by Shirani Sabaratnam. Liverpool, UK
- 2014 - Hustlers Convention (Feature Documentary Film) Jalal Mansur Nuriddin, Chuck D, Malik Al Nasir, Ice-T, Immortal Technique, Alan Douglas, Sonia Sanchez, Melle Mel, Fab Five Freddy. Directed by Mike Todd. Manchester, UK

== See also ==
- The Watts Prophets
- Malik & the O.G's
- Rapping
