= Gylan Kain =

American poet and playwright (1942–2024)

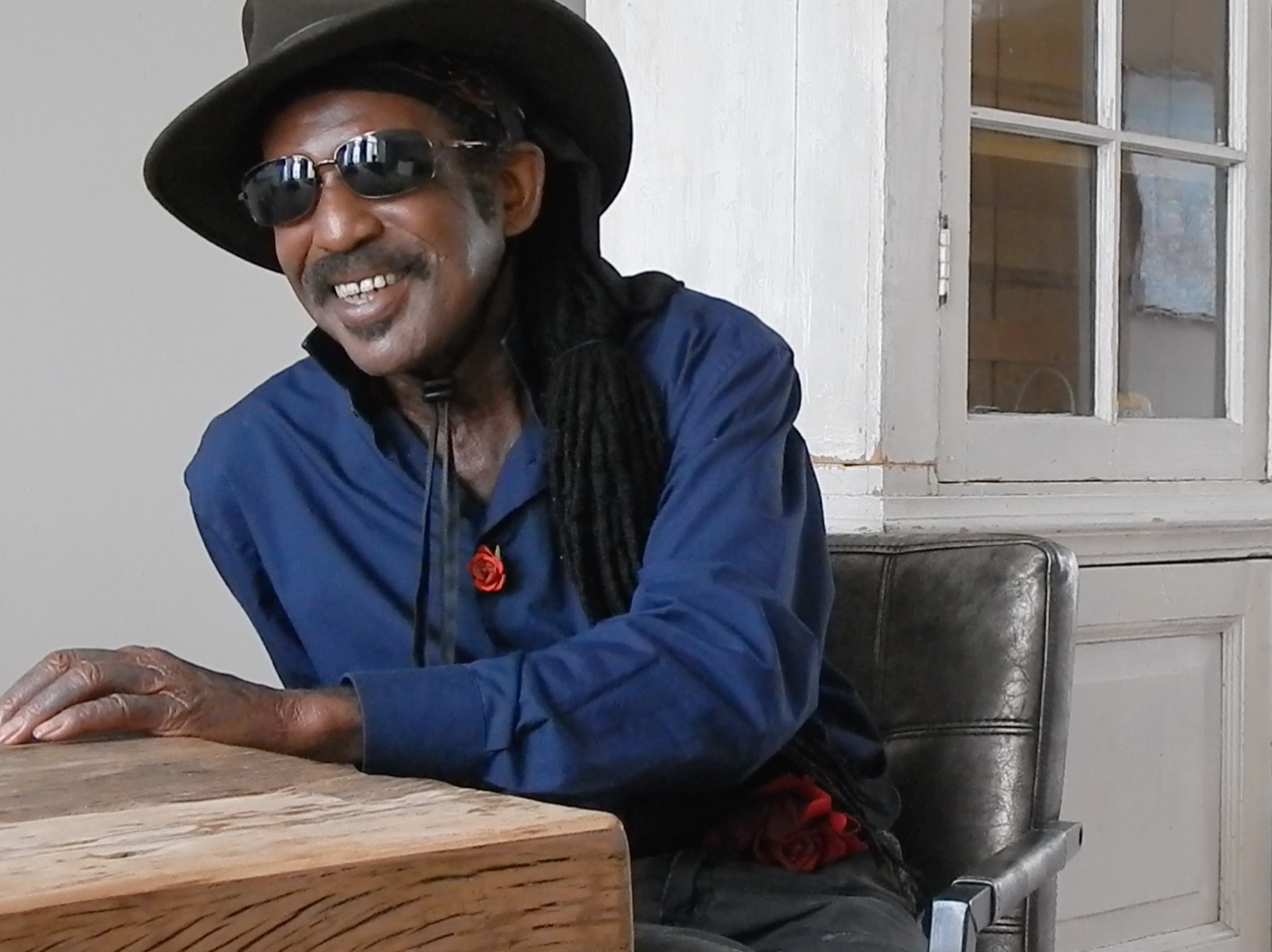

Frank Gillen Oates (May 26, 1942 – February 7, 2024), better known by his stage name Gylan Kain (sometimes simply KAIN, Kain or Kain the Poet), was an American poet and playwright.

== Biography ==
Frank Gillen Oates was born at Harlem Hospital in New York City on May 26, 1942, and raised by his mother, Hilda Oates.

After a stint at Hunter College in Manhattan, he began acting and adopted a new name, a twist on Dylan, in reference to the poet Dylan Thomas, and the biblical figure Cain. He was a founding member, in 1968, of the Original Last Poets (along with Abiodun Oyewole and David Nelson, with Felipe Luciano soon added). Kain personally created the aggressive, rhythmic delivery of spoken word aka performance poetry as it is known today. He often performed with hand drums or backing musicians such as saxophonists and bass guitarists.

In 1970, Kain began performing and recording solo – his poetry set to music, sound and percussion. His 1970 album "The Blue Guerilla" was well received by critics and audiences with its single "Ain't It Fine" reaching the pop charts that year.

Kain's work has been sampled without pre-consent by well-known artists including Dr. Dre and The Prodigy. One of his performances was sampled into the club hit Voodoo People by The Prodigy. Dr. Dre sampled an excerpt of Kain performing his poem, "The Shalimar" on Dre's track entitled "Intro" from the album entitled "The Chronic." After legal action was successfully taken to procure compensation for work sampled by The Prodigy, spokespersons for The Prodigy claimed that efforts had been made to procure permission from Kain for use of his work but those efforts had been unsuccessful because Kain, who valued his privacy, could not be located in time. Dr. Dre has yet to compensate Kain for work sampled without prior consent. This has led some fans to criticize Dr. Dre for exploiting the work of an influential Black artist while building a reputation as an empowering force in the Black American community as a founding member of N.W.A.

From 1990 through the 21st century Kain performed poetry in prestigious European music venues and festivals with his blues band entitled "baby kain." He also did multimedia collaborations with the percussionist Z'EV and appeared with the Dutch jazz/hip-hop/fusion group Electric Barbarian, appearing on their 2004 album él. He is also the subject of several documentary films including films directed by Ian Kerkhof.

His daughter, Amber Kain, is an actress, author and playwright. His adopted son is actor Khalil Kain, best known for starring as "Raheem" in the 1992 crime thriller Juice featuring 2Pac.

Gylan Kain died in a care home in Lelystad, Netherlands on February 7, 2024. He was 81.

== Discography ==
- 1970 - KAIN: The Blue Guerrilla.
- 1997 - Baby Kain: Feel This.
- 2004 - Electric Barbarian: él.

== Films ==
- 1971 - Right On!: Poetry on Film (Original Last Poets). Directed by Herbert Danska.
- 1990 - Wings of Fame. Directed by Otakar Votocek.
- 1995 - The Turner Revelation directed by Aryan Kaganof
- 1995 - Reflections on Dead Weight directed by Aryan Kaganof
- 2018 - "Ultramarine" directed by Vincent Meessen (belgique)
