= I Believe (EMF song) =

1991 single by EMF

Single by EMF

from the album Schubert Dip
- B-side: "When You're Mine"
- Released: January 1991
- Length: 3:51 (album version)
- Label: Parlophone
- Songwriter: EMF
- Producer: Pascal Gabriel

EMF singles chronology
"Unbelievable" (1990)	"I Believe" (1991)	"Children" (1991)

"I Believe" is a song by British band EMF, released as the second single from their first album, Schubert Dip (1991). The song was released as a single in January 1991 by Parlophone Records in the UK following their big hit "Unbelievable". It is written by the band and produced by Pascal Gabriel, reaching number six on the UK Singles Chart. In the US, the song was the band's third single, reaching number 10 on the US Billboard Modern Rock Tracks chart. The accompanying music video received heavy rotation on MTV Europe in March 1991.

The song includes the sound of band member Derry Brownson smashing a wall—on the album version, the band can be heard laughing at Brownson for trashing the flat at the beginning of the song.

== Critical reception ==
Simon Williams from NME wrote, "'I Believe' demonstrates how efficiently EMF have perfected those delayed Jesus Jones sampling techniques, and provides scant else to suggest that EMF are any more of a longterm proposition than Halo James. Maybe the radio-friendly 7-inch is more palatable, with the few decent bits of the three hour Dean Age Rampage Mix creamed off for a more compact package. Let's hope so, because this plinky plonky 12" version is like the old Walthamstow Circular route—going nowhere noisily."

== Track listings ==
- UK CD (CDR 6279)
1. "I Believe" – 3:16
2. "I Believe" (Dean Age Rampage Mix) – 6:31
3. "When You're Mine" – 4:10
4. "Unbelievable" (Funk Mix) – 5:14
- UK 7-inch (R 6279)
1. "I Believe" – 3:16
2. "When You're Mine" – 4:10
- UK 12-inch (12R 6279)
1. "I Believe" (Dean Age Rampage Mix)
2. "Unbelievable" (Funk Mix)
3. "When You're Mine"
- UK remix 12-inch (12RX 6279)
1. "I Believe" (Colt 45 Mix) – 8:19
2. "I Believe" (Inframental Mix) – 6:38

== Charts ==
=== Weekly charts ===
Chart (1990–1991)	Peak position
Australia (ARIA)	54
Belgium (Ultratop 50 Flanders)	32
Europe (Eurochart Hot 100)	15
Finland (Suomen virallinen lista)	4
Germany (GfK)	26
Ireland (IRMA)	2
Luxembourg (Radio Luxembourg)	3
Netherlands (Dutch Top 40)	36
Netherlands (Single Top 100)	28
New Zealand (Recorded Music NZ)	35
Switzerland (Schweizer Hitparade)	6
UK Singles (Official Charts)	6
UK Airplay (Music Week)	12
UK Dance (Music Week)	31
US Modern Rock Tracks (Billboard)	10

=== Year-end charts ===
Chart (1991)	Position
UK Singles (OCC)	88
