= Umar Bin Hassan =

American poet and recording artist

Umar Bin Hassan (born Gilbert Jerome Huling in Akron, Ohio, 1948) is an American poet and recording artist, associated with The Last Poets. He sold his younger sister's record player to purchase a bus ticket to New York City, where he joined the Last Poets. In the mid-1990s, he recorded a solo album titled Be Bop or Be Dead on Bill Laswell's Axiom Records through Island/PolyGram.

In 1994, Bin Hassan appeared on the Red Hot Organization's compilation CD, Stolen Moments: Red Hot + Cool, appearing on a track titled "This is Madness" alongside Abiodun Oyewole and Pharoah Sanders. The album was named "Album of the Year" by Time magazine.

Bin Hassan appeared on the 2013 Dead Prez album, Information Age (Deluxe Edition). In 2018, Bin Hassan was the subject of a documentary film entitled Scared of Revolution, which was written and directed by the Dutch filmmaker Daniel Krikke. In 2023, Bin Hassan wrote a memoir in comic book form entitled Up South in Akron, which was published by Music Arkives.

== Solo discography ==
- Be Bop or Be Dead (Axiom Records, 1993)
- To the Last (Baraka Foundation, 2001)
- Life Is Good (Stay Focused Records, 2002)
