= Abiodun Oyewole =

American writer

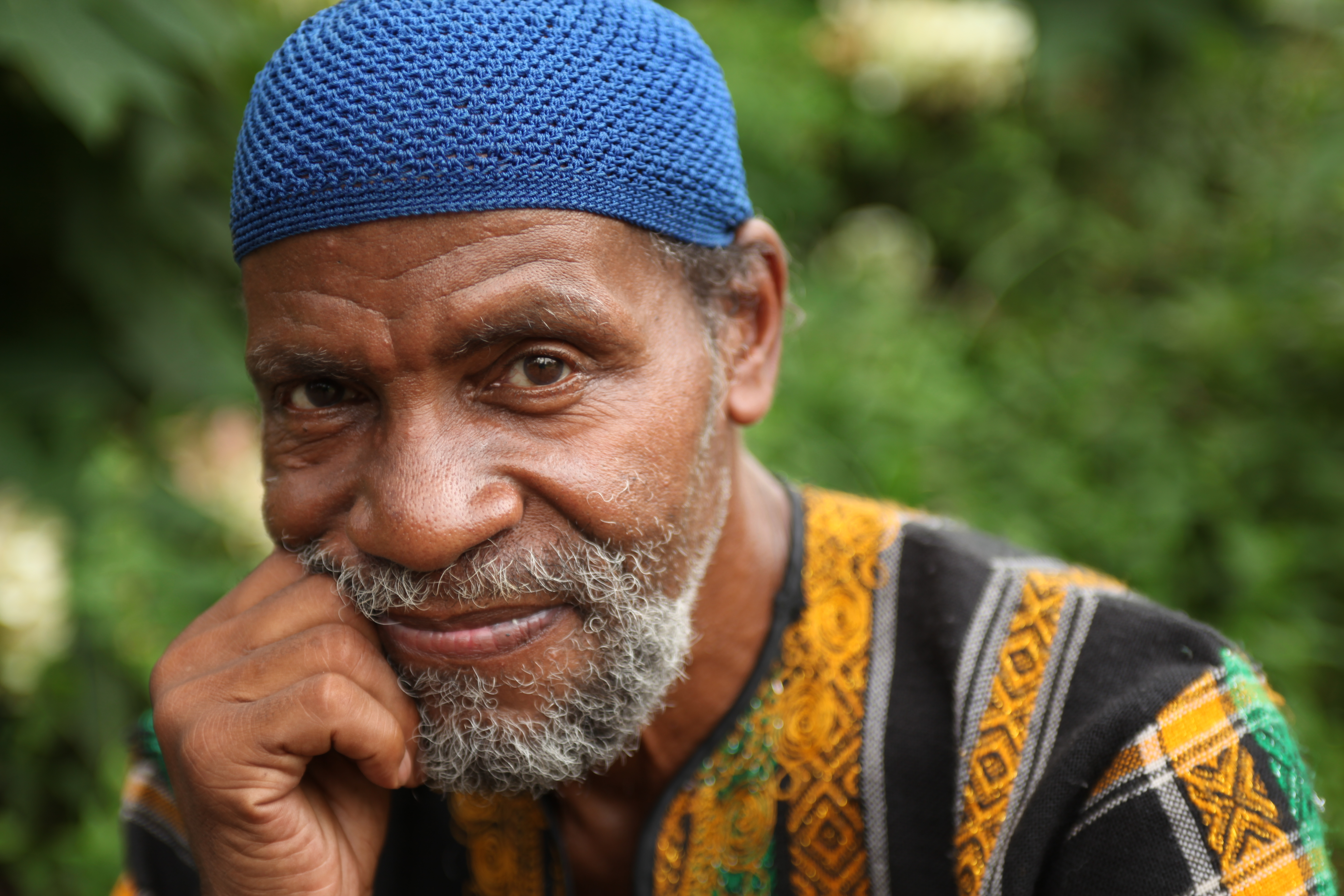
Abiodun Oyewole in Harlem

Abiodun Oyewole (born Charles Davis, February 1948), is a poet, teacher and member of the African-American music and spoken-word group The Last Poets, which developed into what is considered to be the first hip hop group. Critic Jason Ankeny wrote, "With their politically charged raps, taut rhythms, and dedication to raising African-American consciousness, the Last Poets almost single-handedly laid the groundwork for the emergence of hip-hop."

== Early life ==
Oyewole was born in Cincinnati, Ohio and he moved with his maternal aunt and her new husband at age three to Queens, New York. At the age of 15, he attended a Yoruba Temple in Harlem. It was there that he was given the name by which he is best known.

As a youth, Oyewole was influenced by jazz and gospel music played by his parents and the poems of Langston Hughes.

== The Last Poets ==
The group was born on May 19, 1968, Malcolm X's birthday, when Oyewole, David Nelson, and Gylan Kain read poetry in tribute to Malcolm X. The group was based in black nationalism and quickly became known throughout the African-American community. They are generally credited, along with Gil Scott-Heron, as being major influences on the development of hip hop.

At one point, Oyewole was forced to leave the group as he spent four years in a North Carolina prison, convicted of larceny. After serving two and a half years of a three-year sentence, because of good behavior he was eligible for study release during the day. Oyewole continued his education at nearby Shaw University in Raleigh, and earned his undergraduate degree. He subsequently went on to earn a doctorate from Columbia University in New York City, where he once served as a member of the faculty.

== Later years ==
In 1994, Oyewole appeared on the Red Hot Organization's compilation CD, Stolen Moments: Red Hot + Cool, appearing on an update of "This is Madness" alongside Omar Ben Hassen and Pharoah Sanders. The album was named "Album of the Year" by Time.

Recently, Oyewole has been touring the world giving lectures on poetry and politics and hosting a weekly Open House for up-and-coming poets. He has also taught at the Schomburg Center for Research in Black Culture in Harlem. In 2022, he released a solo CD entitled "Gratitude".

== Quotes ==
- "(Malcolm X) was our pathway to revolutionary understanding. Malcolm X went through a series of rites of passage - from Malcolm Little to Detroit Red to Satan to Malcolm X to El-Hajj Malik El-Shabazz. All this because the man never stopped trying to develop and recognize the best of himself. He was self-determined. Malcolm was saying we need to be more. And we heard that. And he said it better than anybody ever said it. He made it clear to us. So all we wanted to do, was to be disciples of Malcolm, in a sense, using poetry to illuminate the same values that he planted in our head." On Malcolm X's influence on the Last Poets (2001).

== See also ==
- Black Nationalism
- Gil Scott-Heron
- Hip hop music
- Jalal Mansur Nuriddin
