= Ian Dench =

British musician (born 1964)

- Born: Ian Alec Harvey Dench; 7 August 1964 (age 62); Cheltenham, England
- Occupations: Songwriter, musician
- Instruments: Guitar, keyboards

Ian Alec Harvey Dench (born 7 August 1964) is an English songwriter and musician. He is the guitarist and principal songwriter for EMF, who scored a major international hit reaching number 1 in the United States with "Unbelievable" in 1991. It was voted one of BBC Radio 2's 'Greatest Guitar Riffs'.

== Early life ==
Ian Alec Harvey Dench was born in Cheltenham. His father, Harold Dench, taught Ian classical guitar. He attended The Crypt School in Gloucester from 1975, where one year at Prizegiving, his chosen prize of "100 Greatest Rock Licks" was somewhat frowned upon, compared to the preferred academic tomes of others. Dench began his music career playing in a Gloucester City punk band called Curse. He then formed the Gloucester-based band Apple Mosaic, who were signed to Virgin Records and released the single "Honey If".

== EMF ==
In 1989, Dench met the other members of EMF, and within a few months of playing together, they were signed to a major label. Their debut hit, "Unbelievable", was written by Dench although credited as EMF, and reached number three in the UK singles chart. Six months later, the song reached number one in America.

In an interview with Spin in September 1991, Dench commented on the dynamics within the band, stating that: "I'm the musical director, but I couldn't do it without them. They provide so much attitude.

The band split in 1997 due to musical differences.

== Post EMF and songwriting career ==
After leaving EMF, he found independent success with the band Whistler, signed to Wiiija Records. Whistler released two albums, Whistler and Faith in the Morning.

In 2007, Dench wrote the duet "Beautiful Liar" for Beyoncé and Shakira, and "Tattoo" for American Idol winner Jordin Sparks with Amanda Ghost, with whom he had worked since 1995 when they wrote for Ghost's Ghost Stories album. Beyoncé's 2008 album, I Am... Sasha Fierce, saw a further three Dench and Ghost collaborations: "Disappear", "Ave Maria", and "Satellites".

Dench co-wrote "Colours" on the Prodigy's 2009 album, Invaders Must Die, and "Red" a top 5 hit for Daniel Merriweather in the UK in May 2009. "Gypsy", another collaboration with Amanda Ghost, was the third single from the album, She Wolf by Shakira.

From March 2009 until November 2010, Dench was Vice President of A&R at Epic Records in New York, where he A&R'd albums by Alice Smith and Augustana and signed the acts Progress in Color and HeyHiHello.

In 2011, Dench collaborated in the writing of "Bedroom Hymns" from Florence and the Machine's Ceremonials album, and her collaboration with ASAP Rocky, "I Come Apart".

In 2013, Dench collaborated on the Sub Focus track "Endorphins", reaching number 10 in the UK chart; the title track from The Conversation by Texas; and "Astronaut" and "Run" by Joel Compass.

The singer-songwriter Jamie Cullum sang two Dench-penned songs in the ITV series The Halcyon in 2016.

In 2017, it was announced that Dench was heading up a new record label, LGM Records, with former Goldheart Assembly frontman James Dale, where the two developed and signed indie pop band Friedberg. The label was featured in The Times and other publications before founding a digital advertising agency called SINE Digital.

In 2018, Dench worked with Amanda Ghost and Marius de Vries on the song "The Wonder" for the musical King Kong on Broadway.

== Awards ==
Dench won an Ivor Novello Award for "Beautiful Liar" in the Best Selling British Song Category in 2008. In 2009, he was nominated for a Golden Globe as co-writer of "Once in a Lifetime", sung by Beyonce as the part of the soundtrack from Beyoncé's film, Cadillac Records. He was nominated for two Grammy Awards in 2010, one as co-producer of two tracks on Beyoncé's album I Am... Sasha Fierce, which was nominated as Album of the Year and the other for "Once in a Lifetime".
