= Matrix & Futurebound discography =

- Studio albums: 2
- Singles: 13
- Compilation albums: 1
- Promotional singles: 3

The discography of British drum and bass production duo Matrix & Futurebound consists of one studio album, one compilation album, six singles and one promotional single.

In 2005, Jamie Quinn collaborated with Liverpool-based producer Brendan Collins to release "Strength 2 Strength". They later released their debut album Universal Truth on 9 April 2007 through Metro Recordings and Viper Recordings, under the alias Matrix & Futurebound. On 10 March 2008, they released "Womb" as a single from the Universal Truth album later followed by a new single "Shanghai Surprise" featuring singer Cat Knight. On 30 May 2011 they released a mix compilation album Worldwide 001.

On 6 May 2012, they released "All I Know" featuring British singer Luke Bingham. The song peaked at number at number 29 on the UK Singles Chart and number 6 on the UK Dance Chart, which marks their first charting single as a duo. Later on in 2012, their second single "Magnetic Eyes" featuring British singer and rapper Baby Blue was released on 30 December 2012. The song peaked at number 24 on the UK Singles Chart and number 5 on the UK Dance Chart. On 29 December 2013, they released "Control" featuring British singer Max Marshall. The song peaked at number 7 on the UK Singles Chart.

== Albums ==
=== Studio albums ===
List of studio albums, with selected chart positions, sales figures and certifications
Title	Details	Peak chart positions
Title	Details	UK Dance
Universal Truth	Released: 9 April 2007; Label: Metro Recordings, Viper Recordings; Format: Digital download, CD	—
Mystery Machine	Released: 12 April 2019; Label: Metro Recordings, Viper Recordings; Format: Digital download, CD	5
"—" denotes a recording that did not chart or was not released in that territory

=== Compilation albums ===
Title	Album details
Worldwide 001	Released: 30 May 2011; Label: Metro Recordings, Viper Recordings; Format: Digital download, CD

== Singles ==
=== As lead artists ===
Title	Year	Peak chart positions					Certifications	Album
Title	Year	UK	UK Dance	BEL (Fl)	IRE	SCO	Certifications	Album
"Strength 2 Strength"	2005	—	—	—	—	—		Universal Truth
"Womb"	2008	—	—	—	—	—		Universal Truth
"All I Know" (featuring Luke Bingham)	2012	29	6	—	—	36		Non-album single
"Magnetic Eyes" (featuring Baby Blue)	2012	24	5	117	—	29		Non-album single
"Control" (featuring Max Marshall)	2013	7	2	—	97	7	BPI: Gold	Mystery Machine
"Don't Look Back" (featuring Tanya Lacey)	2014	38	12	—	—	29		Non-album single
"Glow Worm"	2015	—	—	—	—	—		Non-album single
"Happy Alone" (featuring V. Bozeman)	2015	—	—	—	—	—		Mystery Machine
"Scatterbrain"	2016	—	—	—	—	—		Non-album single
"Fire" (featuring Max Marshall)	2016	—	—	—	—	—		Mystery Machine
"Light Us Up" (featuring Calum Scott)	2017	—	—	—	—	—		Non-album single
"Human" (featuring Raphaella)	2017	—	—	—	—	—		Mystery Machine
"Mystery Machine"	2018	—	—	—	—	—		Mystery Machine
"Live Another Day" (featuring Alex Hepburn)	2018	—	—	—	—	—		Mystery Machine
"Tardis"	2018	—	—	—	—	—		Mystery Machine
"Believe"	2018	—	—	—	—	—		Mystery Machine
"Got You There" (featuring Zelah)	2019	—	—	—	—	—		Mystery Machine
"Follow Me" (featuring Ayak)	2019	—	—	—	—	—		Mystery Machine
"Back To You" (with Synth System featuring Anna Simone)	2022	—	—	—	—	—		Non-album single
"You Don't Have To Wait" (featuring En Mute)	2023	—	—	—	—	—		Non-album single
"—" denotes single that did not chart or was not released.

=== Promotional singles ===
Title	Year	Album
"Shanghai Surprise" (featuring Cat Knight)	2008	Non-album singles
"Move On" (featuring Cat Knight)	2012	Non-album singles
"The Wall"	2017	Non-album singles
"New Energy" (with Blaine Stranger featuring Tom Cane)	2024	20 Years of Viper

=== Remixes ===
Title	Year	Original Artist
"LoveStoned"	2007	Justin Timberlake
"System"	2007	Nu:Tone
"Hold On"	2009	Lazee (featuring Neverstore)
"One Time We Lived"	2009	Moby
"Cult of Snap"	2009	Snap!
"Get Shaky"	2009	The Ian Carey Project
"Shot Caller"	2010	The Ian Carey Project
"Can't Stop Me"	2012	Afrojack & Shermanology
"Get Busy"	2012	Rude Kid (featuring Skepta)
"Stars"	2013	Mark Owen
"Polarized"	2013	Seven Lions (featuring Shaz Sparks)
"Cannonball (Earthquake)"	2014	Showtek and Justin Prime (featuring Matthew Koma)
"Liberate"	2014	Eric Prydz
"Strangers"	2014	Seven Lions and Myon & Shane 54 (featuring Tove Lo)
"Let It Be"	2014	Labrinth
"Gecko (Overdrive)"	2014	Oliver Heldens (featuring Becky Hill)
"Not Letting Go"	2015	Tinie Tempah (featuring Jess Glynne)
"Wild Horses"	2016	Birdy
"Breathing Underwater"	2016	Emeli Sandé
"Til' I'm Done"	2018	Paloma Faith
"Tell Me You Love Me"	2018	Demi Lovato
"Watercolour"	2018	Pendulum
"The Temple"	2019	Raise Spirit
"Shine"	2019	Emeli Sandé
"Wait for You"	2020	Tom Walker
"Back To U"	2020	Slander and William Black
"Halfway Down"	2023	Slander and Ashley Drake
