= Fleur East discography =

English singer-songwriter Fleur East has released two studio albums, one extended play and eight studio singles. Fleur signed a record deal with Syco in 2014 and released her debut album Love, Sax and Flashbacks in 2015. It charted at 14 on the UK Albums Chart and has been certified silver by the British Phonographic Industry. The album spawned two singles, European chart hit "Sax", which was certified platinum in the UK and charted at number 3, and "More and More".

She released her second studio album Fearless under her own label Platinum East in March 2020. The album's lead single "Favourite Thing" charted at number 80 in the UK, and the song "Size" was used in a Debenhams Christmas ad campaign in 2019. The album was scheduled to be supported by East's first headline tour, The Fearless Experience.

== Albums ==
Title	Details	Peak chart positions				Sales	Certifications
Title	Details	UK	IRE	SCO	SWI	Sales	Certifications
Love, Sax and Flashbacks	Released: 4 December 2015; Label: Syco Music; Format: CD, digital download, streaming	14	16	12	95	UK: 92,000	BPI: Silver
Fearless	Released: 20 March 2020; Label: Platinum East; Format: CD, digital download, streaming	—	—	—	—		

== Extended plays ==
Title	Details
She	Released: December 2013; Label: Self-released; Format: Digital download (Free)

== Singles ==
=== As lead artist ===
Title	Year	Peak chart positions									Certifications	Album
Title	Year	UK	AUS	AUT	FRA	GER	IRE	POL	SCO	SPA	Certifications	Album
"Broken Mirror" (with Cutline)	2012	—	—	—	—	—	—	—	—	—		Non-album singles
"Turn the Lights On"	2013	—	—	—	—	—	—	—	—	—		Non-album singles
"Sax"	2015	3	25	41	200	42	5	50	2	24	BPI: Platinum; ARIA: Gold; PROMUSICAE: Platinum; BEA: Gold; BVMI: Gold; ZPAV: Gold	Love, Sax and Flashbacks
"More & More"	2016	—	—	—	—	—	—	—	—	—		Love, Sax and Flashbacks
"Favourite Thing"	2019	80	—	—	—	—	96	—	17	—		Fearless
"Figured Out"	2019	—	—	—	—	—	—	—	—	—		Fearless
"Size"	2019	—	—	—	—	—	—	—	—	—		Fearless
"Lucky"	2020	—	—	—	—	—	—	—	—	—		Fearless
"Mine"	2020	—	—	—	—	—	—	—	—	—		Fearless
"Not Alone" (NHS charity single)	2020	— (Note: "Not Alone" did not enter the Official Singles Chart, but peaked at number 46 on the Official Singles Sales Chart, which counts only paid-for sales in the UK.)	—	—	—	—	—	—	66	—		Non-album singles
"You're Christmas to Me"	2020	—	—	—	—	—	—	—	—	—		Non-album singles
"Count the Ways"	2023	—	—	—	—	—	—	—	—	—		Non-album singles
"—" denotes a single that did not chart or was not released in that territory.

=== As featured artist ===
Title	Year	Peak chart positions	Album
Title	Year	UK	Album
"The One" (Horx & P3000 featuring Fleur)	2012	—	Non-album single
"One in a Million" (Drumsound & Bassline Smith featuring Fleur)	2013	53	Wall of Sound
"Around and Around" (Cicada featuring Fleur)	2014	—	Non-album single
"—" denotes a single that did not chart or was not released in that territory.

== Other charted songs ==
Title	Year	Peak chart positions	Album
Title	Year	UK	Album
"Breakfast"	2015	167	Love, Sax and Flashbacks

== Guest appearances ==
Title	Year	Album	Artist
"Turn It Up"	2012	Nextlevelism	DJ Fresh

== Music videos ==
Title	Year
"Broken Mirror" ft. Cutline	2012
"Turn the Lights On"	2012
"One in a Million" with Drumsound & Bassline Smith	2012
"Sax"	2015
"More & More"	2016
"Favourite Thing"	2019
"Figured Out"	2019
"Lucky"	2020
"Mine"	2020
"Not Alone" (NHS charity single)	2020
