= Tom Havelock =

English singer-songwriter

- Also known as: Tom Cane
- Born: Thomas Havelock
- Origin: Oxford, England
- Genres: Electro-pop, dance, indie, alternative
- Occupations: Singer, songwriter, frontman
- Instruments: Vocals, cello, electric guitar
- Years active: 2011–present

Tom Havelock is a British singer-songwriter and lead singer of the band Prep. He is also sometimes known by his stage name Tom Cane.

== Music career ==
=== Early beginnings ===
Havelock was an academic and music scholar at Eton before becoming a student at the University of Oxford when he decide to join in a band with his three close childhood friends back in 1997 to play a few college gigs. Along with Henry Morton Jack, Marcus Efstratiou and Rupert Harrison, they initially performed under the name The Full Monty. Their sound was comparable to the likes of Crosby, Stills, Nash & Young – breezy West Coast harmonies and lightweight sunshine psychedelia. An early demo caught the imagination of local label Shifty Disco (themselves still in their first year infancy). In the November of that year a single "Welcome" was released. This was followed by a national tour with labelmates Beaker and Dustball. The band started to gel into a serious unit, but things were moving on already. They parted company with Rupert and recruited a new member, Owen O'Rorke. Their name changed to Hester Thrale and they started to move away from their early sounds, using more keyboards and more experimental guitar sounds, inspired by the likes of Radiohead, Pink Floyd and The Beatles (circa their 1968 album-period). All four members are accomplished musicians and switch between guitar, keyboard and bass. Tom was the group's primary vocalist.

The band's music have often been compared to that of Radiohead, Pink Floyd, The Doors, Human League and German experimental work. The band had actually supported Radiohead at their gig in South Park, Oxford. They were selected personally by Radiohead from 120 local acts to open the all-day concert. Shortly afterwards they signed to the fledgling db Records in 2001, a label set up by veteran A&R man David Bates, the man who discovered Def Leppard. They had met Dave three years prior after he went to their first ever gig at The Pit in Witney. At the time the only other notable acts of the label were the Brighton duo known as The Electric Soft Parade and singer-songwriter Tom McRae. The band have been ensconced in the studio, writing and recording at a prolific rate, something that had become their trademark over the previous couple of years.

They have also undergone two more name changes: initially they had been known as Moth for a few months, but after being contacted by a Christian rock outfit from Cardiff, whom had explained their strong rights to the name, they had finally settled on the name Psychid. They put out a series of singles and EPs receiving BBC Radio One plays from Mark Radcliffe and Jo Whiley before the release of their critically acclaimed debut album in 2003. The album was recorded with producer Chris Hughes, a man who previously went under the name of Merrick in Adam & The Ants. Following support slots with Radiohead, The Electric Soft Parade, and Brendan Benson, the band parted ways in 2006.

Eventually, Tom founded Hook and the Twin with drummer Marcus Efstratiou. The duo have released a string of singles, attracting radio DJ fans, including Rob da Bank, Huw Stephens, John Kennedy and Zane Lowe. Their first album titled Never Ever Ever was released in 2013.

Havelock was also an accomplished cellist. He has performed in tracks for Tom McRae's 2000 self-titled album and the Cold Specks' 2012 album I Predict a Graceful Expulsion.

=== As a writer ===
Tom has been working with various artists and producers including Raleigh Ritchie, Joel Compass, Sinead Harnett and Craze & Hoax. He adopted the stage name Tom Cane in 2011 and began his solo career as a songwriter. He co-wrote the first single from Sub Focus' new album, "Falling Down" featuring Kenzie May in late 2011. He co-wrote and featured on the single "Through the Night" for Drumsound and Bassline Smith in mid-2012. He has also worked with Cheryl Cole as well, co-writing the title track for her third studio album A Million Lights.

He had co-written the hit single "Magnetic Eyes" featuring Baby Blue with Matrix and Futurebound, which was A List at Radio 1 for 6 weeks. A year later, Tom continued his successful partnership with Matrix and Futurebound, writing their biggest track to date, "Control" featuring Max Marshall, which spent three weeks in the top 10 and has been a major UK airplay hit. Recently, he was a featured performer in the UK top 40 hit single "Half Light" by British musician Wilkinson, which reached number 25 in the UK Singles Chart. It was originally released as the final track from his 2013 album Lazers Not Included before being its sixth and final single.

In 2014, Cane was featured as an uncredited vocalist in songs for Swedish DJ and producer Eric Prydz and Austrian dance music duo Klangkarussell.

=== PREP ===
Havelock joined the band Prep in 2014 as the lead singer, completing the lineup along with bandmates: Llywelyn Ap Myrddin, Guillaume Jambel (GIOM) and Daniel Radclyffe.

== Discography ==
=== Singles ===
==== As featured artist ====
Year	Title	Peak chart positions		Album
Year	Title	UK	SCO	Album
2012	"Through the Night" (Drumsound & Bassline Smith featuring Tom Cane)	34	39	Wall of Sound
2013	"Starting Again" (East & Young featuring Tom Cane)	–	–	Non-album single
2014	"Half Light" (Wilkinson featuring Tom Cane)	25	28	Lazers Not Included
2014	"Sun in Your Eyes" (Michael Brun and DubVision featuring Tom Cane)	–	–	Non-album single
2015	"Feels Good" (Flux Pavilion featuring Tom Cane)	–	–	Tesla
2016	"Time" (Mint Royale featuring Tom Cane)	–	–	Non-album single
2016	"You'll See Me" (Moguai featuring Tom Cane)	–	–	Non-album single
2022	"Not Alone" (Hybrid Minds featuring Tom Cane)	–	–	TBA
2023	"All Makes Sense" (Synergy featuring Tom Cane)	–	–	Non-album single
2023	"Infinity" (Wilkinson featuring Ilira, Iiola and Tom Cane)	–	–	TBA
"—" denotes a song that did not chart or was not released.

=== Other appearances ===
==== Singles ====
Year	Title	Artist	Role	Peak chart positions								Album
Year	Title	Artist	Role	UK	SCO	IRL	BEL	FRA	AUT	GER	SWI	Album
2012	"Falling Down"	Sub Focus featuring Kenzie May	Co-writer	–	–	–	–	–	–	–	–	Torus
2012	"Magnetic Eyes"	Matrix & Futurebound featuring Baby Blue	Co-writer	24	29	–	117	–	–	–	–	Non-album single
2013	"Control"	Matrix & Futurebound featuring Max Marshall	Co-writer	7	7	97	–	–	–	–	–	Mystery Machine
2013	"Summer Calling"	Sigma featuring Taylor Fowlis	Co-writer	–	–	–	–	–	–	–	–	Non-album single
2014	"Liberate"	Eric Prydz	Co-writer, vocals	71	–	–	100	–	–	–	–	Opus
2014	"Netzwerk (Falls Like Rain)"	Klangkarussell	Co-writer, vocals	83	–	96	17	190	7	17	13	Netzwerk
2014	"Don't Look Back"	Matrix & Futurebound featuring Tanya Lacey	Co-writer	38	29	–	–	–	–	–	–	Non-album single
2014	"Symmetry"	Klangkarussell	Co-writer, vocals	–	–	–	65	–	–	–	–	Netzwerk
2014	"Sun Goes Down"	Robin Schulz featuring Jasmine Thompson	Co-writer	94	–	11	6	15	3	2	3	Prayer
2014	"Headlights"	Tor Miller	Co-writer	–	–	–	–	–	–	–	–	American English
2015	"Second Chance"	Digitalism	Co-writer	–	–	–	–	–	–	–	–	Non-album single
2015	"Generate"	Eric Prydz	Co-writer, vocals	–	–	–	–	–	–	–	–	Opus
2015	"La Serenata (Dream of You)"	DJ Pippi and Kenneth Bager featuring Lilly Wright	Co-writer	–	–	–	–	–	–	–	–	Non-album single
2016	"Follow Me"	Steve Angello and Still Young	Co-writer, vocals	–	–	–	–	–	–	–	–	Non-album single
2018	"Synchronise"	Ekko & Sidetrack	Co-writer, vocals	–	–	–	–	–	–	–	–	Non-album single
"—" denotes a song that did not chart or was not released in that territory.

==== Non-singles ====
Year	Title	Artist	Album	Role
2012	"A Million Lights"	Cheryl Cole	A Million Lights	Co-writer
2013	"Back to Life"	Drumsound & Bassline Smith	Wall of Sound	Featured artist
2014	"Never Take It Away"	The Aston Shuffle featuring Mayer Hawthorne	Photographs	Co-writer
2014	"The Same"	Riton featuring Irfane	Bad Guy RiRi (EP)	Co-writer
2014	"No Other Way"	Sinéad Harnett featuring Snakehips	N.O.W. (EP)	Co-writer
2014	"Live Life Now"	Cheryl Cole	Only Human	Co-writer
2014	"All in One Night"	Cheryl Cole	Only Human	Co-writer
2015	"Forgiven"	Kwabs	Love + War	Co-writer
2015	"Brother"	Ben Haenow	Ben Haenow	Co-writer
2015	"LMHY"	Plaitum	Plaitum	Co-writer
2015	"Carousel"	Plaitum	Plaitum	Co-writer
2015	"Higher"	Plaitum	Plaitum	Co-writer
2015	"Sway"	Plaitum	Plaitum	Co-writer
2019	"Together"	Third Party	Together	Co-writer, vocals
2019	"Shadows"	Third Party	Together	Co-writer, vocals
2019	"Time to Get Over It"	Anna of the North	Dream Girl	Co-writer
2019	"Lonely Life"	Anna of the North	Dream Girl	Co-writer
2019	"Thank Me Later"	Anna of the North	Dream Girl	Co-writer
2019	"Used to Be"	Anna of the North	Dream Girl	Co-writer
2019	"What We Do"	Anna of the North	Dream Girl	Co-writer
2019	"Illuminate"	Sub Focus and Wilkinson	Portals	Co-writer, vocals
2020	"Just Hold On"	Sub Focus and Wilkinson	Portals	Co-writer, background vocals
2020	"Time"	Sub Focus and Wilkinson	Portals	Co-writer, vocals
2020	"Turn the Music Up"	Prep	Prep	Co-writer
2020	"Wouldn't Wanna Know"	Prep	Prep	Co-writer
2020	"Years Don't Lie"	Prep	Prep	Co-writer
2020	"Carrie"	Prep	Prep	Co-writer
2020	"On and On"	Prep	Prep	Co-writer
2020	"Pictures of You"	Prep	Prep	Co-writer
2020	"The Stream"	Prep featuring Miso	Prep	Co-writer
2020	Rain"	Prep	Prep	Co-writer
2020	"Danny Came Up"	Prep	Prep	Co-writer
2021	"They All Are"	Banners	It's Gonna Be OK	Co-writer
2021	"Dance Magic"	Foxes	The Kick	Co-writer
2022	"The Kick"	Foxes	The Kick	Co-writer
2022	"Close Your Eyes"	Wilkinson featuring Iiola	Cognition	Co-writer
2022	"The Deceiver"	Sam Tompkins	Who Do You Pray To?	Co-writer
2022	"In the Wild"	Rae Morris	Rachel@Fairyland	Co-writer
2022	"When the Sun Goes Down"	1991 featuring Tom Cane	Odyssey	Co-writer, vocals
