= Me Without You (Loick Essien song) =

Single by Loick Essien

from the album Identity
- Released: 4 November 2011
- Recorded: 2010
- Genre: R&B
- Length: 4:01
- Label: Sony Music Entertainment
- Songwriter(s): Loick Essien, Adam Argyle, Dee Adam
- Producer(s): Mike Spencer

Loick Essien singles chronology
"How We Roll" (2011)	"Me Without You" (2011)

Music video
- "Me Without You" on YouTube

"Me Without You" is a song by British R&B singer Loick Essien. The song was released in the United Kingdom on 4 November 2011 through Sony Music Entertainment as the fourth single from the upcoming studio album, Identity (2012). The track was written by Essien, Adam Argyle and Dee Adam and produced by Mike Spencer. On 11 November 2011 "Me Without You" debuted at number fourteen on the UK Singles Chart; having sold 23,962 copies in its first week.

== Background ==
Discussing the song, Loick admitted: "There's nothing worse than ending a relationship with someone you don't want to break up with. This song is about trying to rebuild your life when it feels like you can't go on without them. Everyone has felt like that at some point and it's something we can all relate to."

== Music video ==
A music video to accompany the release of "Me Without You" was first released onto YouTube on 11 October 2011 at a total length of Four minutes.

== Track listing ==
iTunes EP
No.	Title	Length
1.	"Me Without You"	4:01
2.	"Me Without You" (Gareth Wyn Remix)	6:01
3.	"Me Without You" (Vado Radio Remix)	4:26
4.	"Me Without You" (Unplugged)	4:16
5.	"Love Drunk" (Labrinth Remix)	3:43

== Charts ==
=== Chart performance ===
Having been released on 4 November 2011 in the United Kingdom, "Me Without You" made its first chart appearance on 11 November at number fourteen; having sold 23,962 copies. The track also appeared as the fourth highest-selling song of the week, and charted as such on the UK R&B Chart. On its second week charting, the track fell eight places to number twenty-two.

Chart (2011)	Peak position
UK Hip Hop/R&B (OCC)	4
UK Singles (OCC)	14

== Release history ==
Country	Release Date	Format	Record Label
United Kingdom	4 November 2011	Digital Download	Sony Music Entertainment
