= How We Roll =

How We Roll may refer to:

- How We Roll (album), an album by the Barrio Boyzz
- "How We Roll" (Big Pun song), 2001
- "How We Roll" (Loick Essien song), 2011
- "How We Roll" (Ciara and Chris Brown song), 2023
- "How We Roll", a song by Hollywood Undead from the album Day of the Dead
- How We Roll (TV series), a 2022 CBS sitcom inspired by ten-pin bowler Tom Smallwood
