= Love, Sax and Flashbacks =

- Standard edition cover. The background is coloured red instead of blue on deluxe editions of the album.

Studio album by Fleur East
- Released: 4 December 2015
- Recorded: 2014–2015
- Genres: Hip hop; soul; R&B
- Length: 40:33
- Label: Syco
- Producers: Zukhan Bey; Julian Bunetta; Electric; Oak Felder; Emanuel "Eman" Kiriakou; Ian Kirkpatrick; Pop & Oak; Sermstyle; TMS

Fleur East chronology
Love, Sax and Flashbacks (2015)	Fearless (2020)

Singles from Love, Sax and Flashbacks
- 1. "Sax" Released: 6 November 2015; 2. "More and More" Released: 22 January 2016

Love, Sax and Flashbacks is the debut studio album by English singer, songwriter and rapper Fleur East. It was released on 4 December 2015, through Syco.

It was preceded by the lead single "Sax", which reached number 3 in the UK and received a platinum certification. "More and More" was released as the second single.

The album received mainly positive reviews upon its release. It peaked at number 14 on the UK albums chart with 26,691 copies sold in its first week. Elsewhere it peaked at number 12 on the Scottish albums chart and number 16 on the Irish albums chart. Since its release Love, Sax and Flashbacks has sold 92,000 copies and has been certified silver by the British Phonographic Industry (BPI).

== Background ==
In 2005, East was in the girl group Addictiv Ladies, who were on the second series of The X Factor, mentored by judge and head of Syco Music, Simon Cowell, but were eliminated in the first week after ending up in the bottom two with Chico Slimani. East worked as a waitress at the London nightclub Aura Mayfair to help support her music career, and was a fitness model with the agency W Athletic, but struggled with her finances.

East later said that by early 2014, she was "definitely depressed" and considering ending her music career, until her friends and relatives encouraged her to audition for The X Factor. In June 2014, East auditioned for the eleventh series of The X Factor. She progressed to the live shows in the Over 25 category, mentored by Cowell. In the ninth week of the live shows, East performed "Uptown Funk" by Mark Ronson featuring Bruno Mars. East's version went to number one on the UK iTunes Store, which led the original song to be released five weeks earlier than planned; it subsequently reached number one on the UK Singles Chart. The following week, during the show's final, East was announced as the runner-up in the competition, losing to Ben Haenow.

In January 2015, East announced that she had signed to Cowell's Syco Music record label. She recorded her debut album with musicians such as Wayne Hector, The Invisible Men, Jack Splash and TMS.

== Singles ==
"Sax" was released as the album's lead single on 6 November 2015. Following a critically acclaimed performance of the single on The X Factor, it debuted and peaked at number three on the UK Singles Chart. This was notably higher than the debut single of contemporary, Ben Haenow, which peaked at number 21 in October. "Sax" spent 4 weeks in the chart's top 5. A music video for the single was released on 26 November.

"More and More" was released as the album's second single on 22 January 2016. East performed the track for the first time at the 2016 National Television Awards.

"Breakfast" was made available to download on 20 November 2015, and charted at number 167 in the UK. It was released as a single in the US on 19 May 2016.

== Development ==
After being announced as the runner-up on The X Factor, East signed a recording contract with Syco in January 2015. She began working on her debut studio album shortly following The X Factor tour. East split her time between London and Los Angeles to record it. During recording, she was inspired by "Uptown Funk", and described the songs on the album as "very uptempo and very energetic with lots of attitude. [The album has] got loads of influences from the old school. Lots of funk, hip-hop, soul; loads of different sounds fused together. Everything about that song – the uptempo vibe, the high energy, the brass, the old school funk sound – was just right up my street. I've definitely taken a few influences from that." East revisited her cover of "Uptown Funk", which she had recorded as a studio track prior to her performance on The X Factor, and subsequently re-recorded it for the album.

The lead single "Sax", according to East, was one of the first tracks recorded for the album. East stated that she became fond of the track following its recording, and that she worked hard to make many of the remaining tracks have the same feel and energy to match its quality.

In July 2015, Cowell told The Sun, regarding East's album: "I've heard it and it's world class. She has discovered who she wanted to be. Sometimes you just spot someone who's not obvious and Fleur's a good example of that". By August, work on the album was almost done. East worked with producers Darkchild, Babyface, TMS, Fraser T Smith and Wayne Hector.

== Usage in media ==
East's cover of Alicia Keys' song "Girl on Fire" was used in Virgin Media's television advertisement for broadband.

"Like That" was featured in the movie A Bad Moms Christmas.

Sax was featured in Just Dance Unlimited.

== Critical reception ==
Professional ratings
Aggregate scores
Source	Rating
AnyDecentMusic?	6.5/10
Review scores
Source	Rating
AllMusic	3.5/5 stars
The Arts Desk	4/5 stars
Digital Spy	4/5 stars
Evening Standard	2/5 stars
The Guardian	2/5 stars
The Irish Times	4/5 stars

Love, Sax and Flashbacks has received generally favourable reviews from music critics following its release. While many praised the album's production and upbeat tone, some criticized it for lacking substance. Neil Z. Yeung from AllMusic gave the album three and a half stars out of five, arguing that despite the "strong '80s throwback vibe" its production was "by no means derivative and lazy", and considered that "for a runner-up and her first outing, this is top-spot quality pop". Digital Spy awarded the album 4 out of 5 stars, calling it "more than just funky brass" and identifying the "refreshing" lack of balladry present. Particular praise was aimed at the album's lead single "Sax" and the track "Gold Watch". The Irish Times were positive in their review of the album, awarding it 4 out of 5 stars. They described the album as "a sassy, funky, brass-infused collection that is equal parts nostalgia trip and sugar rush." They particularly praised the track, "Like That", calling it "a song that would give Beyoncé a run for her money." Pop Crush also gave the album a positive review, commenting "Love, Sax and Flashbacks is not a game-changing pop masterpiece, and at times, the constant throwbacks start to border on pastiche. What it does have is a breezy, likable charm, and enough interesting twists to feel like a promising start for Fleur East on her quest to become an all-singing, all-dancing pop sensation" and calling it a "true standout". They awarded the album 4 out of 5 stars. The Arts Desk gave the album 4 out of 5 stars, commenting the record "does everything that good pop should, and it does it surprisingly well."

The Guardian were less positive, awarding the album only 2 out of 5 stars. While they commended East's "enormous energy", they criticised the record for lacking substance, suggesting that it fails in its "assumption that if the songs dazzle with bright lights and fanfare the public might not notice its vacancy". Evening Standard also gave the album 2 out 5 stars, saying the "signature note of Syco cheapness clings to the whole production and ultimately lets her down."

== Chart performance ==
The album debuted at number 14 on the UK Albums Chart selling 26,691 copies. In Scotland the album debuted at number 12 in its first week of release. The album debuted at number 16 in Ireland. To date the album has sold over 92,000 copies and received a silver certification.

== Track listing ==
Love, Sax and Flashbacks – Standard edition
No.	Title	Writer(s)	Producer(s)	Length
1.	"Sax"	Fleur East; Camille Purcell; Edvard Førre Erfjord; Henrik Barman Michelsen; James Abrahart	Electric; Afterhrs^{[b]}	3:56
2.	"Breakfast"	Julian Bunetta; Iain Farquharson	Bunetta	3:25
3.	"More and More"	East; Purcell; Erfjord; Michelsen; Abrahart	Electric; Ian Kirkpatrick	3:55
4.	"Gold Watch"	East; Purcell; Thomas Barnes; Peter Kelleher; Benjamin Kohn; Edward Drewett	TMS	3:32
5.	"Love Me or Leave Me Alone"	East; Emanuel "Eman" Kiriakou; Evan Kidd Bogart; Zukhan Bey	Kiriakou; Bey	3:15
6.	"Paris"	East; Erfjord; Michelsen; Drewett; Teena Marie; Allen McGrier	Electric	3:22
7.	"Kitchen"	East; Warren "Oak" Felder; Trevor Trevorious" Brown; Donald Fletcher; Weldon Parks	Oak Felder	3:32
8.	"Over Getting Over"	Kirby Lauryen Dockery; Andrew "Pop" Wansel; Felder; Brown	Pop & Oak; Trevorious^{[a]}	3:21
9.	"Baby Don't Dance"	East; Jamie Sanderson; Abrahart; Charles Spurling; Hank Ballard	Sermstyle; Nick Seeley^{[b]}	3:25
10.	"Tears Will Dry"	East; Sanderson; Maureen "Mozella" McDonald	Sermstyle	3:14
11.	"Never Say When"	East; Lauryen; Wansel; Felder	Pop & Oak	3:23
12.	"Uptown Funk" (live X Factor performance)	Jeff Bhasker; Philip Lawrence; Bruno Mars; Mark Ronson; Nicholas Williams; Devon Gallaspy; Lonnie Simmons; The Gap Band; Rudolph Taylor	Bunetta	2:20
Total length:				40:33

Love, Sax and Flashbacks – Deluxe edition (bonus tracks)
No.	Title	Writer(s)	Producer(s)	Length
12.	"Like That"	East; Fraser Thornycroft-Smith; Ina Wroldsen; Janée "Jin Jin" Bennett; Ash Soan; Ben Epstein	Fraser T Smith; Zack the Lad^{[b]}; Benjamin Miller^{[b]}	3:11
13.	"Serious"	Wayne Hector; Daniel Davidsen; Peter Wallevik; Mich Hansen	Davidsen; Wallevik; Cutfather	3:29
14.	"Know Your Name"	East; Kasper "Kay" Larsen; Hansen; Maegan Cottone; Tebey Ottoh	Kay; Cutfather	3:28
15.	"Uptown Funk" (live X Factor performance)	Bhasker; Lawrence; Mars; Ronson; Williams; Gallaspy; Simmons; The Gap Band; Taylor	Bunetta	2:20
16.	"Girl on Fire"	Alicia Keys; Salaam Remi; Bhasker; Billy Squier; Onika Tanya Maraj	Afterhrs	3:35
Total length:				54:22

=== Notes ===
- ^{^[a]} signifies a co-producer
- ^{^[b]} signifies an additional producer
- "Paris" contains elements from "Ooo La La La" by Teena Marie
- "Kitchen" contains a sample of the recording and elements from "Dancing Machine" by The Jackson 5
- "Baby Don't Dance" contains elements from "Unwind Yourself" by Marva Whitney
- Credits adapted from album liner notes

== Charts and certifications ==
=== Weekly charts ===
Chart (2015–16)	Peak position
Irish Albums (IRMA)	16
Scottish Albums (Official Charts)	12
Swiss Albums (Schweizer Hitparade)	95
UK Albums (Official Charts)	14

=== Year-end charts ===
Chart (2015)	Position
UK Albums (OCC)	99

=== Certifications ===
Region	Certification	Certified units/sales
United Kingdom (BPI)	Silver	92,000
