= Fleur East =

British singer (born 1987)

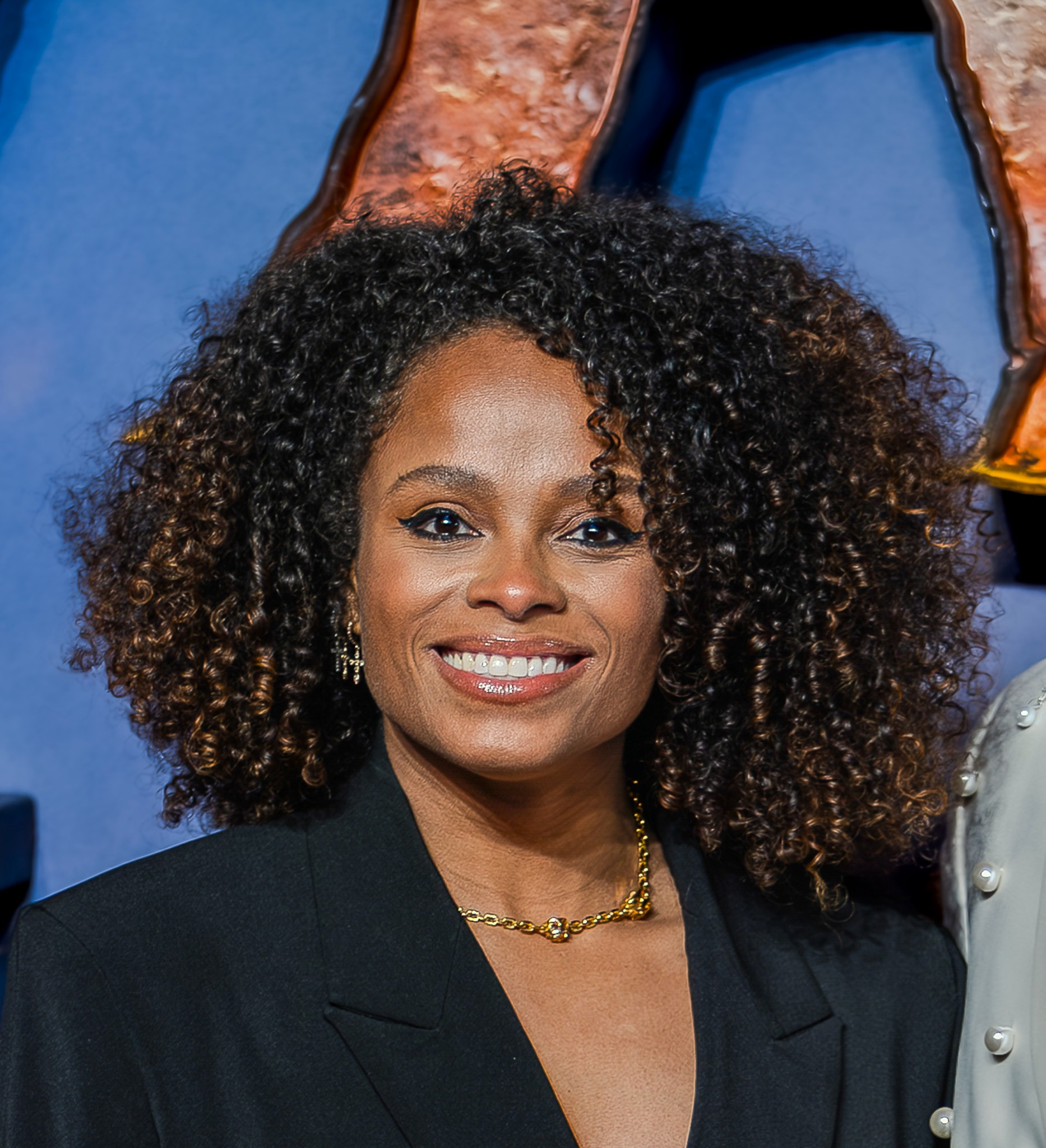
- East in 2025

Background information
- Born: 29 October 1987 (age 38)
- Origin: Walthamstow, London, England
- Genres: R&B; hip hop; drum & bass; pop
- Occupations: Singer; songwriter; rapper; radio presenter; television presenter
- Years active: 2005–present
- Labels: Strictly Rhythm; Syco; Columbia; Platinum East
- Formerly of: Addictiv Ladies
- Spouse: Marcel Badiane-Robin (m. 2019)

Fleur East (born 29 October 1987) is an English singer, songwriter, rapper and presenter. East competed on the second series of The X Factor in 2005 as part of the girl group Addictiv Ladies but was unsuccessful. In 2012, she signed with Strictly Rhythm. In collaboration with Drumsound & Bassline Smith, she released "One in a Million" (2013), which peaked at number 53 on the UK Singles Chart.

In 2014, East returned to The X Factor, this time as a solo act, the programme's eleventh series. During the competition, East became the first-ever contestant to reach number one on the UK iTunes Store chart with her cover of "Uptown Funk". She finished the series in second place. East's debut solo single "Sax" reached number three on the UK charts and received a platinum music certification. Her debut studio album Love, Sax and Flashbacks (2015) debuted at number fourteen on the UK Albums Chart and was certified silver by the BPI. In 2020, she released her second studio album, Fearless.

Outside of music, East has ventured into presenting as a television and radio host and competed in I'm a Celebrity...Get Me Out of Here! (2018), Strictly Come Dancing (2022), as well as presenting on Hits Radio and Strictly Come Dancing: It Takes Two.

== Early life ==
Fleur East was born on 29 October 1987 to an English father and a Ghanaian mother. She was raised in Walthamstow, London. She has family living in Yorkshire and she has a younger sister named Keshia, who is an entrepreneur and co-founder of their business, The Kurl Kitchen. She attended Holy Family Technology College in Walthamstow and Queen Mary University of London, where she studied journalism and contemporary history.

== Career ==
=== 2005–2013: The X Factor, Addictiv Ladies and independent releases ===
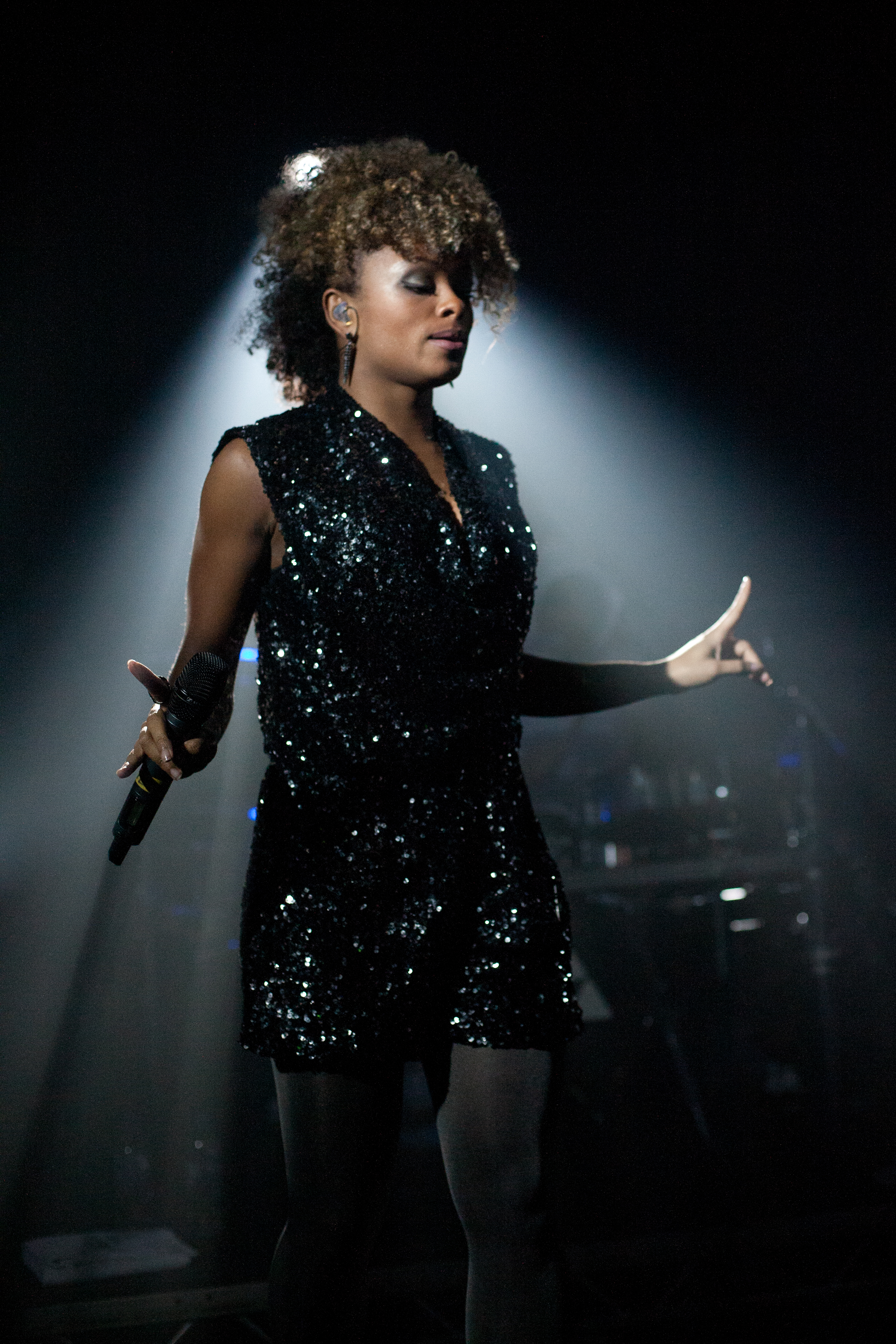
East in 2011

East was in the girl group Addictiv Ladies, who were on series 2 of The X Factor in 2005, mentored by Simon Cowell, but were eliminated in week 1 after ending up in the bottom two with Chico Slimani. She was introduced to drum-and-bass producer DJ Fresh through her manager in 2011, and Fresh subsequently hired her as a vocalist for a BBC Radio 1 Live Lounge session of his. In 2012, she featured on Fresh's song "Turn It Up" from his album Nextlevelism and toured extensively with him in 2012, including performances at T4 on the Beach, V Festival and the iTunes Festival.

East signed to the record label Strictly Rhythm in January 2012 and released two singles as the lead artist (credited as Fleur): "Broken Mirror" with Cutline and "Turn the Lights On" (produced by Culture Shock). She also featured on "The One" by Horx and P3000. In 2013, she featured on Drumsound & Bassline Smith's "One in a Million", which entered the UK Singles Chart at number 53, and headlined the Miss Face of Africa EU ceremony in London. In December 2013, she self-released her debut EP She for free download. One of the EP tracks, "Super Rich Royals", is a mashup cover of "Super Rich Kids" by Frank Ocean and "Royals" by Lorde.

East worked as a waitress at the London nightclub Aura Mayfair to help support her music career, and was also a fitness model with the agency W Athletic, but struggled with her finances. She later said that by early 2014, she was "definitely depressed" and considered ending her music career, until her friends and relatives encouraged her to re-audition for The X Factor.

=== 2014: Return to The X Factor ===
In June 2014, East auditioned for the eleventh series of The X Factor. She sang John Legend's "Ordinary People" in her room audition, where she received three "yes" votes and progressed through to the arena auditions. She sang Chris Brown's "Fine China" at the arena and progressed to the boot camp stage with four "yes" votes. East made it past the six chair challenge and through to the judges' houses stage in the "Over 26s" category, mentored by Cowell once again, to whom she performed "Bang Bang" by Jessie J, Ariana Grande and Nicki Minaj. Cowell chose East for the live shows, alongside Jay James and eventual winner Ben Haenow.

In the semi-final of the live shows, East performed "Uptown Funk" by Mark Ronson featuring Bruno Mars, a rendition The Guardian's Stuart Heritage described as "truly astonishing [...] Fleur barged in and left the competition in ruins. It was two minutes and 53 seconds of all-out attack; possibly the biggest moment that any [Simon] Cowell show has produced since we first met Susan Boyle, only this was even more surprising because we already knew Fleur, and this far she'd merely been adequate." Popjustice declared it "the most exciting moment of the entire series [...] Whichever act wins The X Factor this coming weekend, Fleur's now established herself as the one who deserves and will undoubtedly get The Full Ella (FKA The Full Leona) when it comes to career rollout." East's version went to number one on the UK iTunes Store, which led the original song to be released five weeks earlier than planned; it subsequently reached number one on the UK Singles Chart. In the final, the show's final, East was announced as the runner-up in the competition, losing to fellow category act, Ben Haenow with 34.3% of the votes to Haenow's 57.2%.

The X Factor performances and results (2014)
Stage	Song	Theme	Result
Room audition	"Ordinary People"	Free choice	Through to arena
Arena audition	"Fine China"	Free choice	Through to bootcamp
Six chairs challenge (bootcamp)	"Paper Planes"	Free choice	Through to judges' houses
Judges' houses	"Bang Bang"	Free choice	Through to live shows
Live week 1	"All About That Bass"	Number Ones	Safe (5th)
Live week 2	"It's a Shame (My Sister)"	80's Night	Safe (7th)
Live week 3	"Lady Marmalade"	Saturday night at the movies	Safe (5th)
Live week 4	"Thriller"	Fright Night (Halloween)	Safe (6th)
Live week 5	"Will You Be There"	Michael Jackson vs. Queen	Safe (5th)
Live week 6	"Bang Bang"	Big Band	Safe (2nd)
Live week 7	"I'm Every Woman"	Whitney Houston vs. Elton John	Safe (2nd)
Quarter-Final	"A Fool in Love"	Song chosen by celebrity guest (Emeli Sandé)	Safe (3rd)
Quarter-Final	"If I Ain't Got You"	Song chosen by the public	Safe (3rd)
Semi-Final	"All I Want for Christmas Is You"	Christmas song	Safe (2nd)
Semi-Final	"Uptown Funk"	Song to get to the final	Safe (2nd)
Live week 10	"Can't Hold Us"	No theme	Runner-up (34.3%)
Live week 10	"Beneath Your Beautiful"	Celebrity duet (with Labrinth)	Runner-up (34.3%)
Live week 10	"Uptown Funk"	Best of the series	Runner-up (34.3%)
Live week 10	"Something I Need"	Winner's single	Runner-up (34.3%)

=== 2015–2017: Love, Sax and Flashbacks ===
In January 2015, East announced that she had signed to Cowell's record label Syco Music. She recorded her debut studio album with musicians including Wayne Hector, the Invisible Men, Jack Splash, and TMS. She announced in July 2015 that she had been working on her first fashion collection with women's fashion brand Lipsy London. "Sax", the lead single from her debut album, was released in November 2015 and reached number three in the UK. Her debut album, titled Love, Sax and Flashbacks, was released on 4 December. On 22 January, East released the single "More and More". She performed the single at the National Television Awards. In 2016, East signed with Columbia Records to launch her international music career.

In October 2017, it was revealed that East and Syco had parted ways after three years via mutual agreement.

=== 2018–2020: I'm a Celebrity...Get Me Out of Here! and return to music ===
On 12 November 2018, East was announced as participating in that year's series of I'm a Celebrity...Get Me Out of Here!. East finished in fourth place on 8 December 2018. Later that month, East announced via Instagram that she would be releasing her first single in four years, "Favourite Thing". The single was released on 4 January 2019 in addition to the music video release on YouTube. East also performed the song live for the first time on television on This Morning.

In June 2019, Bauer Media announced that East would take over hosting the breakfast show on national radio station, Hits Radio alongside co-hosts James Barr and Greg Burns. The first show aired on 12 July 2019. On 7 September 2019, East started hosting the Saturday Morning show 9am-12noon across the Hits Radio Network.

On 18 November 2019, East released her new single, "Size". The single was featured in the Debenhams Christmas ad campaign. East released her new single "Lucky" on 31 January 2020 along with its official music video. The video was shot over a period of six months and includes footage from East's travels around the world.

East's second album Fearless was released on 20 March 2020. East appeared on series 16-19 of Ant & Dec's Saturday Night Takeaway where she would go to an area of the UK and give tickets to people for a 'Takeaway Getaway' holiday from TUI. She released the official NHS charity single "Not Alone" on 9 April 2020 with 100% of the profits going towards the COVID-19 NHS appeal. The single premiered on The One Show alongside its official music video.

=== 2022–present: Strictly Come Dancing and It Takes Two ===
Throughout the summer of 2022, East performed at Butlin's. Later that year, she was announced as a contestant on the twentieth series of Strictly Come Dancing where she was partnered with Vito Coppola. Despite surviving 4 dance offs, she achieved the first perfect 40 of the series in Blackpool for her Couple's Choice, and finished as a series runners-up. In June 2023, East was announced to be replacing Rylan as the co-host of the spin-off show Strictly Come Dancing: It Takes Two alongside Janette Manrara.

Week #	Dance / Song	Judges' scores					Result
Week #	Dance / Song	Horwood	Mabuse	Ballas	Du Beke	Total	Result
1	Cha-cha-cha / "Let's Get Loud"	7	7	7	8	29	No elimination
2	Viennese waltz / "Glimpse of Us"	7	8	6	7	28	Safe
3	American Smooth / "Part of Your World"	6	8	7	8	29	Bottom two
4	Argentine tango / "Paint it, Black"	9	10	9	10	38	Safe
5	Jive / "Waterloo"	7	8	9	8	32	Safe
6	Salsa / "Break My Soul"	8	8	8	8	32	Bottom two
7	Waltz / "I Guess That's Why They Call It the Blues"	9	9	8	9	35	Safe
8	Samba / "Hot"	9	10	10	10	39	Safe
9	Street/Commercial / Destiny's Child megamix	10	10	10	10	40	Safe
10	Rumba / "Too Lost in You"	8	9	9	9	35	Bottom two
11	Quickstep / "I Got Rhythm"	9	10	9	10	38	Safe
12	Paso doble / "The Time is Now"; Charleston / "Tu vuò fà l'americano"	8; 9	9; 10	8; 10	10; 10	35; 39	Bottom two
13	Samba / "Hot"; Freestyle / "Find Me"; Street/Commercial / Destiny's Child megamix	10; 9; 10	10; 10; 10	10; 10; 10	10; 10; 10	40; 39; 40	Runners-up

=== Saturday Night Takeaway (2020–2023) ===
In 2020, East joined the 16th series. She presented the competition and part of the Place on the Plane giveaway, In 2023, East replaced North as Gift on the Shift as North present a new segment on the show. Due to her pregnancy, Clara Amfo replaced East for the show's last series, in 2024.

== Musical style ==
East describes her music as "urban-inspired with a few twists" and lists Michael Jackson, Alicia Keys, Rihanna, Sade, Emeli Sandé, Jessie Ware, and Florence Welch among her inspirations. East's early solo work was heavily influenced by drum and bass artists including Netsky and Matrix & Futurebound.

== Personal life ==
East has been in a relationship with French celebrity fashion designer Marcel Badiane-Robin since 2010. The two first met in a bar in 2009 where Marcel was working as a waiter, but East was not single at the time. A year later they reconnected and started dating. They married in Morocco in 2019. In March 2024, the couple had their first child, a baby girl.

In October 2023 East appeared as a celebrity sitter on Portrait Artist of the Year.

== Discography ==
- Love, Sax and Flashbacks (2015)
- Fearless (2020)

== See also ==
- List of I'm a Celebrity...Get Me Out of Here! (British TV series) contestants
- List of Strictly Come Dancing contestants
- List of The X Factor (British TV series) finalists
