= Stuttering (Loick Essien song) =

Single by Loick Essien featuring N-Dubz

from the album Identity
- Released: 4 February 2011
- Recorded: 2010
- Length: 3:50
- Label: Sony Music Entertainment
- Songwriters: Loick Essien; Richard "Fazer" Rawson; Costadinos Contostavlos
- Producer: StarGate

Loick Essien singles chronology
"Love Drunk" (2010)	"Stuttering" (2011)	"How We Roll" (2011)

N-Dubz singles chronology
"Girls" (2010)	"Stuttering" (2011)	"Morning Star" (2011)

Music video
- "Stuttering" on YouTube

"Stuttering" is a song by R&B singer Loick Essien. The song features vocals from hip hop group, N-Dubz. The track was the third single released from his upcoming debut studio album, Identity, after it was scrapped. It was released on 4 February 2011 via Sony Music Entertainment. The song entered the UK Singles Chart at number 36, making it his first Top 40 single. A music video was made for the single. It was uploaded to YouTube on 6 January 2011. Essien and two members of N-Dubz, Dappy and Fazer, appear in the video. The song has also been sung by R&B artists Mario and Range.

== Track listing ==
Digital download
No.	Title	Length
1.	"Stuttering" (Radio Edit)	3:50
2.	"Stuttering" (Kat Krazy Remix)	3:50

== Chart performance ==
Chart (2011)	Peak position
UK Hip Hop/R&B (Official Charts)	12
UK Singles (Official Charts)	36
UK Singles Downloads (Official Charts)	34

== Release history ==
Region	Date	Format	Label
United Kingdom	4 February 2011	Digital download	Sony Music Entertainment
