= Magnetic Eyes =

Single by Matrix & Futurebound featuring Baby Blue
- Released: 30 December 2012
- Recorded: 2012
- Genre: Drum and bass, dance
- Length: 3:32
- Label: Viper Recordings, Metro Recordings
- Songwriter(s): Jamie Quinn; Brendan Collins; Rachel Prager; Tom Havelock

Matrix & Futurebound singles chronology
"All I Know" (2012)	"Magnetic Eyes" (2012)	"Control" (2013)

Baby Blue singles chronology
"Target" (2012)	"Magnetic Eyes" (2012)	"Bump" (2013)

"Magnetic Eyes" is a song by British drum and bass production duo Matrix & Futurebound, featuring vocals from Baby Blue. The song was released in the United Kingdom on 30 December 2012 for digital download. The song peaked at number 24 on the UK Singles Chart. The song stayed inside the top 40 for six weeks.

== Music video ==
A music video to accompany the release of "Magnetic Eyes" was first released onto YouTube on 4 November 2012 at a total length of three minutes and forty-one seconds. It features Baby Blue fading in and out of focus to reveal images of a wolf.

== Track listings ==
Digital download
No.	Title	Length
1.	"Magnetic Eyes" (Radio Edit)	3:32
2.	"Magnetic Eyes" (Smooth Remix)	4:33
3.	"Magnetic Eyes" (TC Remix)	4:26
4.	"Magnetic Eyes" (Pyramid Remix)	5:05
5.	"Magnetic Eyes" (Extended DJ Mix)	4:06

== Chart performance ==
Chart (2013)	Peak position
Belgium (Ultratop 50 Flanders)	117
Scotland (OCC)	29
UK Dance (OCC)	5
UK Singles (OCC)	24

== Release history ==
Region	Date	Format	Label
United Kingdom	30 December 2012	Digital download	Viper Recordings, Metro Recordings
