= London Boy (mixtape) =

Mixtape by Chip
- Released: 25 December 2012
- Recorded: 2012, Tree Sounds Studios (Los Angeles, California); Metropolis Studios (London, England)
- Genre: Hip hop
- Length: 63:01
- Label: Grand Hustle
- Producers: J.U.S.T.I.C.E. League, Aaron R. Ahhad, The ThundaCatz, Elliot Carter, Charlie Holmes, Carlos King, Jose Cardoza, Glenn Schick

Chip chronology
Transition (2011)	London Boy (2012)

London Boy is a mixtape by English rapper Chip, hosted by DJ Drama. It was released on 25 December 2012 as the first release under his new record label, Grand Hustle via Chip's official website. London Boy features guest appearances from label-mate rappers T.I., Iggy Azalea & B.o.B, American rappers Meek Mill, Young Jeezy, Trae tha Truth, British rappers Skepta, Wretch 32, Blade Brown and Professor Green, American recording artist Jeremih and British singer-songwriters Delilah and Loick Essien - including Mavado, Sevyn and Parker. Production varies from S-X, Dready, The ThundaCatz and Don Cannon, among others. The twenty-track mixtape consists of eighteen original compositions and two remixes.

The mixtape's release was preceded by the underground singles "Let It Breathe", "More Money More Gyal" and "Londoner".

== Background ==
On 7 October 2011, RCA Music Group announced it was disbanding Jive Records, along with Arista Records and J Records. With the shutdown, Chipmunk, and all other artists previously signed to these three labels, had the option to release their future material on the RCA Records brand. Chipmunk chose not to do so, and certain media outlets speculated that he may be dropped from the label. However, Chipmunk instead decided to sign with Grand Hustle, the label of fellow rapper and collaborator, T.I. In December 2011, Chipmunk announced that he would be shortening his stage name to "Chip", under the advice and instruction of T.I., and that all of his future releases would appear under his new stage name.

In January 2012, Chip announced via his official Twitter account that he had been working with Sean Garrett and T.I. on his next project, but did not reveal the name of the project in question. He also posted a picture of himself recording in a studio in Atlanta with T.I. Shortly after the announcement, Chip revealed that throughout the year, he would be posting a series of online video blogs to keep his fans updated on what he was up to. On 10 February 2012, Chip uploaded his own freestyle version of fellow rapper Tyga's smash hit, "Rack City", to his official YouTube account. The video received over 70,000 views and 10,000 likes within the first forty-eight hours of being online. Chip also managed to bag himself a cameo in the music video for British singer-songwriter Tulisa's debut solo single, "Young", while working with her on material for a separate project.

In May 2012, Chip revealed via his official Twitter account that his first project under his new record label would be a mixtape entitled "London Boy", named after the alias he received during his time in America. He also premiered an underground single from the project, "Let It Breathe", to positive reception. Four weeks later, a second underground single, "More Money, More Gyal", featuring Mavado, premiered online, showing the reggae-influenced side of the project. Chip returned to the studio to complete recording on the project during August and September 2012, before unveiling his brand new single produced by The ThundaCatz, "Londoner" is a collaboration with Wretch 32, Professor Green and Loick Essien. The track was released as the project's third underground single on 25 November 2012. On 10 December, Chip revealed the track listing of the mixtape, including collaborations with label mates Iggy Azalea, Trae Tha Truth, T.I, B.o.B previous collaborators Skepta, Mavado, Wretch 32 and Professor Green, and Chip's personal favorite, Young Jeezy. He also re-confirmed the release date of 25 December 2012 and revealed the tape would be available to download free of charge.

== Track listing ==
No.	Title	Producer(s)	Length
1.	"Letter to London" (Intro)	Dready	4:11
2.	"Slick Rick"	Harmony Samuels	3:27
3.	"Hustle Gang" (featuring T.I. and Iggy Azalea)	S-X	3:41
4.	"Pizza Boy" (featuring Meek Mill)	Dready	3:20
5.	"Beautiful"	Harmony Samuels	2:23
6.	"On the Scene" (featuring T.I. and Young Jeezy)	DJ Spinz	4:32
7.	"It's Alright" (featuring Sevyn)	Harmony Samuels	4:00
8.	"My Crew" (featuring Skepta)	S-X	3:39
9.	"Phenomenom" (Remix)		2:04
10.	"Like a Movie"	Dready	3:35
11.	"More Money More Gyal" (featuring Mavado)	Dready	3:20
12.	"Let It Breathe"	Don Cannon	4:01
13.	"R.N.F." (featuring T.I. and Jeremih)	Neenyo	4:00
14.	"Official" (featuring Wretch 32, Blade Brown and Parker)	S-X	5:10
15.	"Dumb" (featuring B.o.B)	DJ Montay	2:49
16.	"Help Me" (featuring Delilah)	Dready	4:15
17.	"We in This Bitch" (Remix)	Kane Beatz	2:04
18.	"Under Oath" (featuring Trae tha Truth)	Amadeus	3:30
19.	"Heart Break" (Outro)	The J.F.L.O.W.S	2:29
20.	"Londoner" (featuring Wretch 32, Professor Green and Loick Essien)	The ThundaCatz	4:19
Total length:			63:01

== Release history ==
Region	Date	Format	Label	Ranking
Worldwide (DatPiff)	25 December 2012	Digital download	Grand Hustle	Certified DatPiff Gold (Over 1,000,000 downloads) 13,900,427 downloads as of 25 April 2015
