= Control (Matrix & Futurebound song) =

Single by Matrix & Futurebound featuring Max Marshall

from the album Mystery Machine
- Released: 29 December 2013
- Recorded: 2013
- Genre: Drum and bass
- Length: 3:48
- Label: 3Beat
- Songwriter(s): Jamie Quinn; Brendan Collins; Tom Havelock
- Producer(s): Matrix & Futurebound

Matrix & Futurebound singles chronology
"Magnetic Eyes" (2013)	"Control" (2013)	"Don't Look Back" (2014)

Max Marshall singles chronology
"Don't Trip" (2013)	"Control" (2013)	"Blu Magic" (2014)

"Control" is a song by British drum and bass production duo Matrix & Futurebound. It was released on 29 December 2013. The song peaked at number seven on the UK Singles Chart, making it the duo's most commercially successful single to date. It was included on the duo's 2019 album Mystery Machine.

== Music video ==
The official video for "Control" premiered on 7 November 2013 through UKF Drum & Bass, at a total length of 3 minutes and 48 seconds.

== Track listing ==
Digital download - single
No.	Title	Length
1.	"Control" (featuring Max Marshall)	3:48

Digital download - EP
No.	Title	Length
1.	"Control" (Matrix & Futurebound's 'S.T.F.U.' Mix)	3:58
2.	"Control" (Torqux Remix)	4:15
3.	"Control" (Yousef 'Circus' Rework)	7:54
4.	"Control" (Apexx Remix)	5:00

== Chart performance ==
=== Weekly charts ===
Chart (2014)	Peak position
Ireland (IRMA)	97
Scotland (OCC)	7
UK Dance (OCC)	2
UK Singles (OCC)	7

== Certifications ==
Region	Certification	Certified units/sales
United Kingdom (BPI)	Gold	400,000^{‡}
^{‡} Sales+streaming figures based on certification alone.

== Release history ==
Country	Release date	Format
Worldwide	29 December 2013	Digital download
