= Something I Need =

2013 single by OneRepublic

Single by OneRepublic

from the album Native
- Released: August 25, 2013
- Recorded: 2012
- Studio: Black Rock (Santorini, Greece)
- Genre: Folk-pop
- Length: 4:00
- Label: Mosley; Interscope
- Songwriters: Ryan Tedder; Benny Blanco
- Producers: Ryan Tedder; Benny Blanco

OneRepublic singles chronology
"Counting Stars" (2013)	"Something I Need" (2013)	"Love Runs Out" (2014)

Music video
- "Something I Need" on YouTube

"Something I Need" is a song recorded by American pop rock band OneRepublic. It was released on August 25, 2013, through Mosley Music and Interscope Records as the third single from their third studio album, Native (2013). The song was written and produced by Ryan Tedder and Benny Blanco. It peaked at number six in Australia, where it has been certified 5× Platinum, and number four in New Zealand, where it has been certified 2× Platinum.

== Background ==
On August 23, 2013, in a response to a question from an Australian fan on Twitter, OneRepublic revealed that "Something I Need" would be the next single released from Native. The track debuted on Australian radio on August 25 and premiered on U.S. radio in mid-September.

== Chart performance ==
The song peaked at number six in Australia, where it has been certified 5× Platinum for sales of over 350,000. In New Zealand, it charted at number four, and has been certified 2× Platinum after selling 30,000 copies. The song has also charted at number one in Poland, number five in Austria, number 72 in Germany and number 21 in Switzerland.

== Music video ==
The official music video was filmed in September 2013 and was directed by Cameron Duddy. Speaking about the video via their Twitter page, OneRepublic said: "The video for 'Something I Need' will hands down be the craziest video we've done. And funniest. And hopefully best. Time for a risk." The music video was released on October 7, 2013. In the video, a man is repeatedly attacked by a dog in slow motion, preventing him from asking his crush out. The man is played by Brian Peterson and the woman by Cailin Russo.

== Credits and personnel ==
Recording

- Recorded at Black Rock Studio, Santorini, Greece
- Additional recordings at Lotzah Matzah Studios, New York City, New York; Patriot Studios, Denver, Colorado; Downtown Studios, New York City, New York, and Audiophile Studios, New Orleans, Louisiana
- Mixed at MixStar Studios, Virginia Beach, Virginia
- Mastered at Sterling Sound, New York

Personnel

- Ryan Tedder – songwriter, producer, instrumentation, programming, engineer
- Benny Blanco – songwriter, producer, instrumentation, programming, backing vocals
- Serban Ghenea – mixer
- John Hanes – engineered for mix
- Phil Seaford – assistant engineered for mix
- Smith Carlson – engineer
- Chris Sclafani – engineer, backing vocals
- Scott "Yarmov" Yarmovsky – assistant engineer, backing vocals
- OneRepublic – backing vocals
- Danielle Edinburgh Wilson – backing vocals
- Margaret-Anne Davis – backing vocals
- Toni Skidmore – backing vocals
- Jermon Wilson – backing vocals
- Ryan's friends and family after a night of drinking – backing vocals (legend)
- Chris Gehringer – mastering
- Will Quinnell – mastering

== Charts ==
=== Weekly charts ===
Chart (2013–2014)	Peak position
Australia (ARIA)	6
Austria (Ö3 Austria Top 40)	5
Germany (GfK)	74
New Zealand (Recorded Music NZ)	4
Poland Airplay (ZPAV)	1
Switzerland (Schweizer Hitparade)	21
UK Singles (Official Charts)	78

=== Year-end charts ===
Chart (2013)	Position
Australia (ARIA)	37
Chart (2014)	Position
Austria (Ö3 Austria Top 40)	60
Poland (ZPAV)	49

== Certifications ==
Region	Certification	Certified units/sales
Australia (ARIA)	5× Platinum	350,000^{‡}
New Zealand (RMNZ)	2× Platinum	30,000^{*}
United States (RIAA)	Gold	500,000^{‡}
^{*} Sales figures based on certification alone.^{‡} Sales+streaming figures based on certification alone.

== Ben Haenow version ==
"Something I Need"

Single by Ben Haenow

from the album Ben Haenow
- Released: December 14, 2014
- Recorded: 2014; Sarm West Studios (London, England)
- Genre: Pop rock
- Length: 3:46
- Label: Syco
- Songwriters: Ryan Tedder; Benny Blanco
- Producer: John Ryan

Ben Haenow singles chronology
"Something I Need" (2014)	"Second Hand Heart" (2015)

Music video
- "Something I Need" on YouTube

In December 2014, Ben Haenow, winner of the eleventh series of The X Factor, released a cover version of "Something I Need" as his winner's single after he won. The song was released as a digital download in the United Kingdom on December 14, with a physical equivalent being released three days later. "Something I Need" was produced by American recording artist John Ryan, who has previously worked with One Direction. All proceeds from the single will go to the children's charity organisation Together for Short Lives.

The song debuted at number one on the UK Singles Chart, making it the Christmas number one. It was the final X-Factor winner's single to reach number one.

=== Background ===
On December 12, 2014, the winner's singles for each of the three finalists of eleventh series of The X Factor were revealed. Haenow and Fleur East would record "Something I Need", whilst Andrea Faustini would record Whitney Houston's "I Didn't Know My Own Strength". On December 14, Haenow and eventual runner-up East both performed the song live on The X Factor final.

This version of the song substitutes the words "die" and "killing" in the pre-chorus and chorus in favor of the words "here", "live" and "loving", presumably to make it more palatable for The X Factor audience, particularly younger viewers.

=== Live performances ===
Haenow performed "Something I Need" on The X Factor live final results show, just after being announced as the winner. He also sang it on Text Santa on December 19.

On January 21, 2015, Haenow performed the song at the 20th National Television Awards.

=== Chart performance ===
The song debuted at number two in the Republic of Ireland, beaten to the top spot by Mark Ronson and Bruno Mars' "Uptown Funk" (which ironically received an early release because it was performed on The X Factor by eventual runner-up Fleur East). It became the first X Factor winner's single to miss the number one spot in Ireland since Steve Brookstein's "Against All Odds" in 2004. In the UK, the song debuted at number one on the UK Singles Chart, becoming the 2014 Christmas number one. The song sold 214,239 copies in its first week, becoming the second-fastest selling single of 2014 (behind Band Aid 30's "Do They Know It's Christmas?"). It was also the year's 58th best-selling song. ("Uptown Funk" would finish at number two on Christmas 2014, and at the same time would become the final number one song of 2014 and first of 2015 in Australia, Canada and the United States in addition to Ireland).

=== Track listing ===
Digital download
No.	Title	Writer(s)	Producer(s)	Length
1.	"Something I Need"	Ryan Tedder; Benny Blanco	John Ryan	3:46

CD single
No.	Title	Writer(s)	Producer(s)	Length
1.	"Something I Need"	Tedder; Blanco	Ryan	3:46
2.	"Jealous Guy" (Live The X Factor Performance)	John Lennon; Yoko Ono; Phil Spector	Julian Bunetta	2:11
3.	"Highway to Hell" (Live The X Factor Performance)	Bon Scott; Angus Young; Malcolm Young	Bunetta	2:10
4.	"Man in the Mirror" (Live The X Factor Performance)	Siedah Garrett; Glen Ballard	Bunetta	2:11

=== Credits and personnel ===
- Ben Haenow – lead vocals, backing vocals
- Ryan Tedder – songwriting
- Benny Blanco – songwriting
- John Ryan – guitar, keyboards, producer, programming, backing vocals
- DIVA Singers – choir
- Ash Howes – mixer
- Matt Brind – strings arrangement
- Mat Bartram – recording
- Ronan Phelan – assistant engineer
- Isobel Griffiths – contractor
- Dick Beetham – mastering

Credits adapted from CD single.

=== Charts and certifications ===
==== Weekly charts ====
Chart (2014)	Peak position
Euro Digital Song Sales (Billboard)	1
Ireland (IRMA)	2
Scottish Singles Sales (Official Charts)	1
South Africa Airplay (EMA)	3
UK Singles (Official Charts)	1

==== Year-end charts ====
Chart (2014)	Position
UK Singles (Official Charts Company)	58

==== Certifications ====
Region	Certification	Certified units/sales
United Kingdom (BPI)	Platinum	507,000
^{*} Sales figures based on certification alone.

=== Release history ===
Region	Date	Format	Label
United Kingdom	December 14, 2014	Digital download	Syco
Ireland	December 14, 2014	Digital download	Syco
United Kingdom	December 17, 2014	CD single	Syco
