= Ben Haenow (album) =

Studio album by Ben Haenow
- Released: 13 November 2015
- Recorded: 2014–2015
- Genre: Pop^{1}; pop rock^{1}
- Length: 51:10
- Label: Syco; RCA; Sony
- Producer: Afterhrs; Smith Carlson; Electric; David Gamson; Jon Green; Jason Halbert; Collin McLoughlin; Tim Powell; Red Triangle; Steve Robson; J.R. Rotem; John Ryan; KOZ

Ben Haenow chronology
Ben Haenow (2015)	Alive (2018)

Singles from Ben Haenow
- 1. "Something I Need" Released: 14 December 2014; 2. "Second Hand Heart" Released: 16 October 2015

Ben Haenow is the self-titled debut studio album by English singer Ben Haenow, released on 13 November 2015, through Syco Music and RCA Records. After winning the eleventh series of The X Factor in 2014, Haenow travelled to Los Angeles to immediately begin development of the album by collaborating with established musicians such as Kelly Clarkson, Julian Bunetta, Iain James, Kodaline, Anne Preven, Red Triangle, Steve Robson, J.R. Rotem, and Amy Wadge.

Haenow described the record as a mélange of uptempo pop rock anthems and pop ballads, making a departure from the rock album he was expected to release following his tenure on The X Factor. Ben Haenow was preceded by the release of its lead single, "Second Hand Heart", which became a top 40 hit on the Official UK Singles Chart. The album's supporting tour, the One Night Tour, commenced in April 2016.

== Background and recording ==
Upon winning the eleventh series of The X Factor, Haenow released his debut single, a cover version of OneRepublic's "Something I Need" in December 2014. The track debuted at the top of the Official UK Singles Chart while simultaneously becoming the UK Christmas number one single of the year. In January 2015, Haenow signed a recording contract with his mentor Simon Cowell's record company Syco Music; and in October 2015, he entered into a US record deal with Sony Music Entertainment's RCA Records label.

Immediately after signing his contract with Syco, Haenow travelled to Los Angeles to begin recording tracks for his debut studio album. He also began to write new material for the album with Kodaline, J.R. Rotem, Amy Wadge, Julian Bunetta, and Steve Robson. Much of the album was recorded on the Westlake Recording Studios in West Hollywood, with Haenow amassing over 60–70 recorded songs for potential selection.

== Composition ==
Haenow described the album as a pop rock record, saying that "About half of the album is in that uptempo pop rock reign, the other half is a mix of ballads and different stuff", while also describing it as "something a bit more organic and more singer-songwriter stuff." Despite being expected to release a rock album due to rock-oriented roots during his season on The X Factor, he felt that recording a full-on rock record would fail to achieve commercial success. "Second Hand Heart" will open the album as the lead track, featuring Kelly Clarkson. Produced by Afterhrs and Julian Bunetta, it was written by Afterhrs members Ian Franzino and Andrew Haas, who co-wrote it with Artist vs. Poet members Joe Kirkland & Jason Dean, with additional writing by Neil Ormandy.

"Slamming Doors", which Haenow co-wrote with Amy Wadge and Jim Duguid, follows as a piano-driven ballad. The third track, "All Yours", was produced by Rotem, who also co-wrote it with Haenow and Wadge. Written by Haenow with Iain James and Robson, "Start Again", follows as the fourth track. Produced by Robson, it was the first song to be written for the album. Haenow co-wrote the ninth track, "Brother", about his sibling, a guitarist whom Haenow had worried about being neglected while he was competing on The X Factor. Haenow's version of "Something I Need" was included as the tenth track and the closing song on the album's standard edition.

== Release and promotion ==
Ben Haenow was released on 13 November 2015, by Syco Music and RCA Records, making him the first male winner of The X Factor to receive an American joint release deal and the second X Factor winner after Leona Lewis, who was also signed to RCA during her tenure with Syco. To promote the album, Haenow premiered "Second Hand Heart" in a live performance on the twelfth series of The X Factor on 31 October 2015.

=== Singles ===
"Second Hand Heart" was released as the lead single from Ben Haenow on 16 October 2015. Syco also issued "Make It Back to Me" and "All Yours" as promotional singles from the album on 4 and 11 November 2015, respectively. Haenow also revealed plans to issue "Slamming Doors" as follow-up single to "Second Hand Heart" in the future. However, these plans have since been halted due to Haenow parting ways with Syco via mutual agreement.

=== Tour ===
On 28 October 2015, Haenow announced the dates for the One Night Tour, his first solo concert tour to support the album, which will commence in April 2016. On 5 February 2016, it was confirmed that more than half of the tour dates had been cancelled due to low ticket sales and Haenow's subsequent departure from his record label.

List of One Night Tour dates and venues
Date	City	Country	Venue
15 April 2016	Manchester	England	Manchester Academy
16 April 2016	Newcastle	England	O2 Academy Newcastle
17 April 2016	Glasgow	Scotland	O2 ABC Glasgow
19 April 2016	Croydon	England	Fairfield Halls
20 April 2016	Ipswich	England	Regent Theatre
21 April 2016	Birmingham	England	O2 Institute Birmingham
22 April 2016	Bristol	England	O2 Academy Bristol
23 April 2016	Sheffield	England	O2 Academy Sheffield

== Commercial performance ==
The album debuted at number 10 on the UK Albums Chart with 18,130 copies sold. In its second week, the album dropped 19 places to number 29, selling 7,743 copies, bringing its total to 25,873 copies sold. In its third week on the chart, the album dropped 1 place to number 30, selling 9,271 copies, bringing the sales total to 35,144 copies sold

== Track listing ==
Ben Haenow – Standard edition
No.	Title	Writer(s)	Producer(s)	Length
1.	"Second Hand Heart" (duet with Kelly Clarkson)	Joe Kirkland; Ian Franzino; Jason Dean; Andrew Haas; Neil Ormandy	Afterhrs; Jason Halbert; Pete Hammerton	3:59
2.	"Slamming Doors"	Ben Haenow; Amy Wadge; Jim Duguid	Afterhrs	3:52
3.	"All Yours"	Haenow; Andrew Jackson; J.R. Rotem; Dave Gibson	Rotem	3:19
4.	"Start Again"	Haenow; Iain James; Steve Robson	Robson	3:31
5.	"Lions"	Jon Green; Michael Jope	Green	3:07
6.	"Testify"	Oliver Leiber; Daniel Bedingfield; David Gamson; Andrew Jackson	Gamson	3:53
7.	"Make It Back to Me"	Haenow; Wadge; Duguid	Duguid	3:59
8.	"Way Back When"	Haenow; Andrew Jackson; Stephen Kozmeniuk	Koz	3:41
9.	"Brother"	Haenow; Tom Havelock; Henrik Barman Michelsen; Edvard Førre Erfjord	Electric	3:56
10.	"Something I Need"	Ryan Tedder; Benny Blanco	John Ryan	3:56
Total length:				36:55

Ben Haenow – Deluxe edition (bonus tracks)
No.	Title	Writer(s)	Producer(s)	Length
11.	"One Night"	Haenow; Fiona Bevan; Rick Parkhouse; George Tizzard	Red Triangle	3:37
12.	"Ready for You"	Haenow; Anne Preven; Smith Carlson; Collin McLoughlin	Carlson; McLoughlin	3:37
13.	"Greatest Mistake"	Haenow; Ed Drewett; Tim Powell	Powell	3:40
14.	"Every Tear You Cry"	Haenow; Dan Gautreau	Gautreau	3:26
Total length:				51:10

== Charts and certifications ==
=== Charts ===
Chart (2015)	Peak position
Irish Albums (IRMA)	16
Scottish Albums (OCC)	7
South African Albums (RISA)	7
UK Albums (OCC)	10
UK Album Downloads (OCC)	9

=== Certifications ===
Region	Certification	Certified units/sales
United Kingdom (BPI)	Silver	60,000^{‡}
^{‡} Sales+streaming figures based on certification alone.

== Release history ==
List of release dates, showing region, formats, label, editions, catalogue number and reference
Region	Date	Format(s)	Label	Edition(s)	Catalog number	Ref.
Worldwide	13 November 2015	CD; digital download	Syco; RCA; Sony Music	Standard	88875139022	
Worldwide	13 November 2015	CD; digital download	Syco; RCA; Sony Music	Deluxe	88875139032	
