= Matrix & Futurebound =

English drum and bass duo

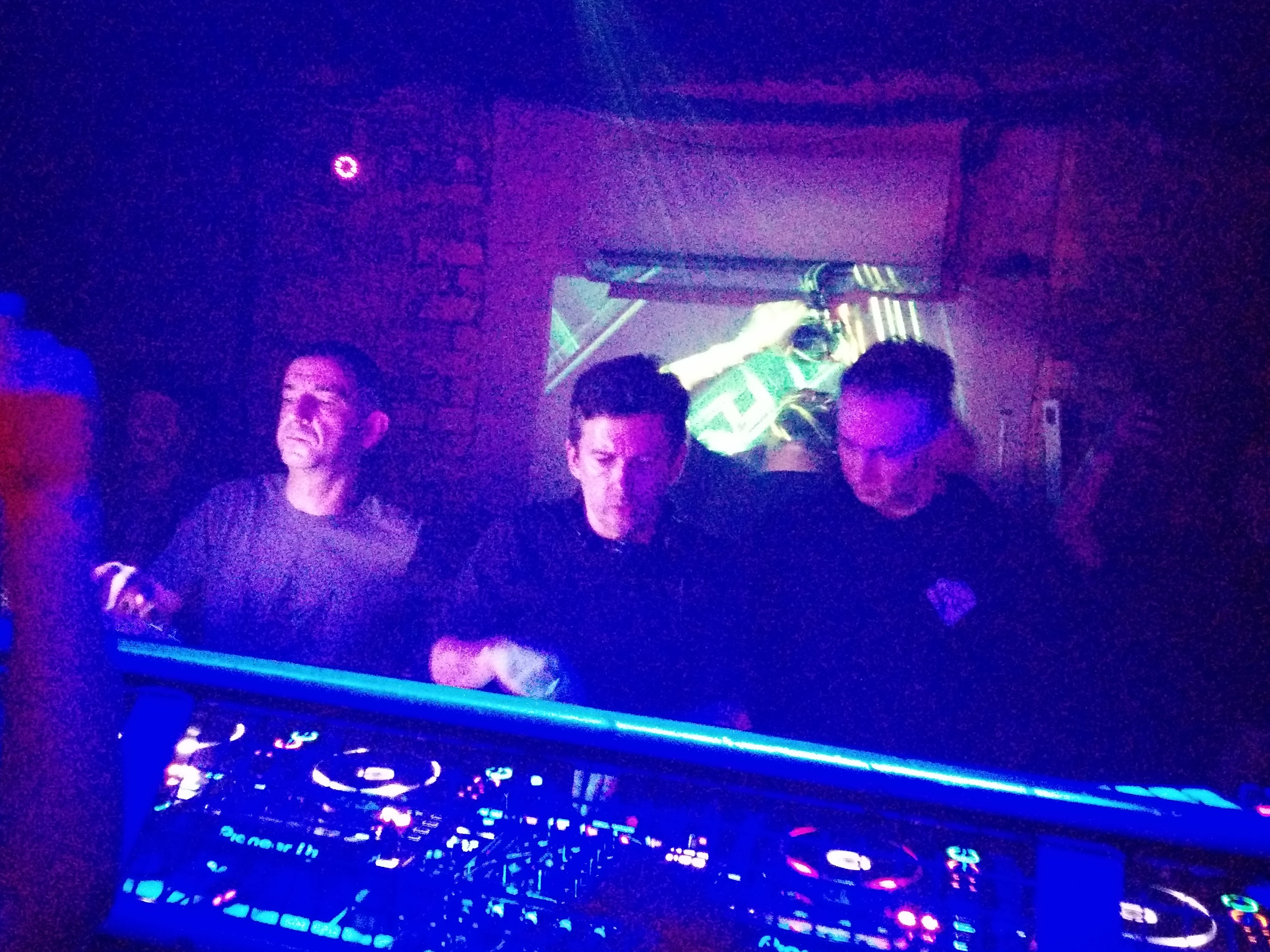
- From left: DJ Hype, Matrix, and Futurebound performing at Egg London in November 2018.

Background information
- Origin: London, England (Matrix); Liverpool, England (Futurebound)
- Genres: Drum and bass
- Years active: 2005–present
- Labels: Metro Recordings; Viper Recordings
- Members: Jamie Quinn; Brendan Collins

Matrix & Futurebound are a British drum and bass duo consisting of Jamie Quinn (Matrix) and Brendan Collins (Futurebound). They have had four top 40 hits on the UK Singles Chart; "All I Know" peaked at number 29 in 2012, "Magnetic Eyes" peaked at number 24 in 2013, "Control" peaked at number seven in 2014 and "Don't Look Back" featuring Tanya Lacey which peaked at number 38 in 2014.

== Career ==
=== 2005–2011: Debut album ===
In 2005, Jamie Quinn collaborated with Liverpool-based producer Brendan Collins known as Futurebound to release "Strength 2 Strength" single. They later released their debut album Universal Truth on 9 April 2007 through Metro Recordings and Viper Recordings, under the alias Matrix & Futurebound. On 10 March 2008 they released "Womb" as a single from the Universal Truth album later followed by a new single Shanghai Surprise featuring singer Cat Knight. On 30 May 2011 they released a mix combination album Worldwide 001 which featured Scott Owens and Cat Knight.

=== 2012–present: Mainstream success ===
On 6 May 2012, Matrix & Futurebound released "All I Know" featuring Luke Bingham. The song went on to chart in the top 30 of the UK Singles Chart at number 29 and top ten on the UK Dance Chart at number six, which marks their first charting single as a duo. Later on in 2012, their second single "Magnetic Eyes" featuring Baby Blue was released on 30 December 2012. The song marked their second top 30 hit, peaking at number 24 on the UK Singles Chart and number five on the UK Dance Chart. The song stayed inside the top 40 for six weeks.

In January 2014, "Control", featuring Max Marshall, entered at number 18 on the UK Singles Chart and peaked at number seven, giving Matrix and Futurebound their biggest hit to date. "Control" was certifying Silver by the British Phonographic Industry. Their next single, "Don't Look Back" featuring Tanya Lacey, was released on 6 July 2014, representing their fourth consecutive track to be playlisted on BBC Radio 1.

Matrix & Futurebound released the singles "Glow", "Scatterbrain" and "The Wall" between 2014 and 2017. The duo have been affiliated with Viper Recordings (Brendan is founder) and had support from BBC Radio 1 DJ and presenter DJ Friction.

In May 2017, Matrix & Futurebound uploaded to their YouTube channel "Light Us Up" featuring Calum Scott, released on the label FFRR.

== Discography ==
=== Studio albums ===
- Universal Truth (2007)
- Mystery Machine (2019)

=== Compilation albums ===
- Worldwide 001 (2011)
