= Second Hand Heart (Ben Haenow song) =

2015 single by Ben Haenow

Single by Ben Haenow featuring Kelly Clarkson

from the album Ben Haenow
- Released: 16 October 2015
- Recorded: 2015
- Genre: Pop
- Length: 3:59
- Label: Syco; RCA
- Songwriters: Joe Kirkland; Ian Franzino; Jason Dean; Andrew Haas; Neil Ormandy
- Producers: Afterhrs; Jason Halbert; Pete Hammerton

Ben Haenow singles chronology
"Something I Need" (2014)	"Second Hand Heart" (2015)	"Alive" (2017)

Kelly Clarkson singles chronology
"Invincible" (2015)	"Second Hand Heart" (2015)	"Piece by Piece" (2015)

"Second Hand Heart" is a song by English singer Ben Haenow, from his self-titled debut studio album, Ben Haenow (2015). Featuring American singer Kelly Clarkson, it is an upbeat pop song produced by Afterhrs, Jason Halbert, and Pete Hammerton, written by Artist vs. Poet members Joe Kirkland and Jason Dean with Afterhrs members Ian Franzino and Andrew Haas, with additional writing by Neil Ormandy. "Second Hand Heart" was issued as the album's lead and only single on 16 October 2015, by Syco Music and RCA Records.

== Background and release ==
After winning the eleventh series of The X Factor and releasing a cover version of OneRepublic's "Something I Need" as his debut single in December 2014, Haenow was signed to a recording contract with record label Syco Music on 6 January 2015, and on RCA Records on 14 October 2015. Through music mogul Simon Cowell and Sony Music UK executive Sonny Takhar, Haenow invited Kelly Clarkson to be featured on one of the album's tracks. He remarked: "The idea of a feature wasn't on the cards at first. But when I heard the vocals on it I was blown away as it gave the song a whole new dimension." Clarkson also commented that she fell in love with the song upon listening it for the first time, saying: "Lyrically and musically, it is right up my alley."

An upbeat pop rock song accompanied by a subtle country folk undertone, "Second Hand Heart" was produced by Jason Halbert and Pete Hammerton with Ian Franzino and Andrew Haas of Afterhrs, who co-wrote it with Artist vs. Poet members Joe Kirkland and Jason Dean, and songwriter Neil Ormandy. Originally intended to be released on 9 October 2015, Haenow announced that the track would be issued on 16 October 2015 as the lead single from his upcoming self-titled debut studio album. On 2 October 2015, Haenow released a preview of the song.

== Live performances and music video ==
Filmed by James Lees in Nashville, Tennessee, the song's accompanying music video premiered on Vevo on 20 October 2015. Haenow first performed "Second Hand Heart" in a live performance on the twelfth series of The X Factor on 31 October 2015.

== Track listing ==
Digital download – Single

No.	Title	Length
1.	"Second Hand Heart" (featuring Kelly Clarkson)	3:59

Digital download – EP

No.	Title	Length
1.	"Second Hand Heart" (featuring Kelly Clarkson) (Acoustic)	3:59
2.	"Second Hand Heart" (featuring Kelly Clarkson) (Wideboys Remix)	4:20
3.	"Something I Need" (Acoustic)	4:15

== Credits and personnel ==
Credits adapted from the "Second Hand Heart" metadata.

- Vocals – Ben Haenow
  - Featured vocals – Kelly Clarkson
- Mixing engineers – Pete Hammerton, Joe Zook
- Mastering engineer – Dick Beetham, Wideboys (Julian Bunetta, Damon Bunetta, Peter Bunetta) (Wideboys Remix)
- Recording engineer – Pete Hammerton
- Producers – Afterhrs (Andrew Haas, Ian Franzino), Jason Halbert, Pete Hammerton, Wideboys (Wideboys Remix)
- Songwriting – Joe Kirkland, Ian Franzino, Jason Dean, Andrew Haas, Neil Ormandy
- Keyboards – Wideboys (Wideboys Remix)
- Remixers – Wideboys (Wideboys Remix)

== Charts ==
Chart (2015)	Peak position
Czech Republic (Rádio – Top 100)	77
Euro Digital Song Sales (Billboard)	20
Ireland (IRMA)	56
Netherlands (Dutch Top 40 Tipparade)	44
Scotland Singles (OCC)	5
South Africa (EMA)	3
UK Singles (OCC)	21

== Certifications ==
Region	Certification	Certified units/sales
South Africa (RISA)	Gold	10,000^
United Kingdom (BPI)	Silver	200,000^{‡}
^{‡} Sales+streaming figures based on certification alone.

== Release history ==
List of release dates, showing region, release format, label catalog number, and reference
Region	Date	Format(s)	Label	Catalog number	Ref
Worldwide	16 October 2015	Digital download – Single	Syco; RCA; Sony Music	GBHMU1500133	
Worldwide	30 October 2015	Digital download – EP	Syco; RCA; Sony Music	886445535976	
