= Loick Essien =

English singer

- Born: Loick Mark Essien
- Origin: Harrow, London, England
- Genres: R&B, electronica, grime, hip hop
- Occupations: Singer, songwriter, dancer
- Years active: 2007–present

Loick Mark Essien is an English singer signed to record label Sony Music. Essien began his musical career after featuring on rapper Chipmunk's single "Beast". Essien was set to release his debut album, Identity, on 5 March 2012 but was dropped from his label weeks before the release date.

== Personal life ==
He studied vocals at The Institute of Contemporary Music Performance. His father is Nigerian and his mother is Ghanaian.

=== Career ===
Essien began his musical career in 2007 when he sang the chorus on Bashy's track, "Black Boys". Essien was uncredited on the track, however. His next appearance was in 2008 when he appeared on rapper Chipmunk's debut single "Beast". The single, released on 8 October 2008, debuted at number 181 in the UK singles chart and later appeared on the album I Am Chipmunk. Essien also featured on artist Bashy's lead single from his upcoming second album, "When the Sky Falls". The single, which was released independently on 12 March 2010, debuted at number 114 in the United Kingdom. On 12 October 2010, Essien released his debut solo single "Love Drunk" in the United Kingdom through Sony Music, where it debuted at number 56 in the UK chart. It was then confirmed in February 2011 that Essien would release his debut album, entitled Identity later that year. The second single to be released from the album, entitled "Stuttering" was released on 6 February 2011 and featured rap group N-Dubz, although only Dappy and Fazer appeared in the single's accompanying music video. The single marked Essien's top 40 debut, when it charted at number 36 on the UK singles chart.

Essien released his third single "How We Roll" featuring singer Tanya Lacey on 3 July 2011. It entered at number two in the UK Singles Chart to become his biggest hit to date. It sold 52,010 copies in its first week. His fourth single from forthcoming album Identity called "Me Without You" was released on 6 November 2011 it debuted and peaked at number 14. On 3 October 2011, he appeared as a guest on Never Mind the Buzzcocks. Loick is now signed to Insanity Records (Sony Music)

== Discography ==
=== Mixtapes ===
Title	Mixtape details
I.D Mixtape	Released: 17 July 2012; Label: Self-released; Format: Digital download

=== Singles ===
List of singles as a lead artist, with selected chart positions and certifications, showing year released and album name
Title	Year	Peak chart positions				Certifications	Album
Title	Year	UK	UK R&B	IRL	SCO	Certifications	Album
"Love Drunk" (featuring Bashy)	2010	56	15	—	—		Non-album singles
"Stuttering" (featuring N-Dubz)	2010	36	12	—	—		Non-album singles
"How We Roll" (featuring Tanya Lacey)	2011	2	1	49	6	BPI: Silver	Non-album singles
"Me Without You"	2011	14	4	—	—		Non-album singles
"Bad Boys Don't Cry" (featuring Bashy)	2012	–	—	—	—		Non-album singles
"—" denotes a recording that did not chart or was not released in that territory.

=== As featured artist ===
Single	Year	Peak chart positions		Album
Single	Year	UK	UK R&B	Album
"Beast" (Chipmunk featuring Loick Essien)	2008	181	—	I Am Chipmunk
"When the Sky Falls" (Bashy featuring Loick Essien)	2010	114	37	The Great Escape

=== Guest appearances ===
Year	Title	Album	Artist
2008	"Black Boys" (Remix)	S4DK Presents – Best of '07	Bashy (featuring Loick Essien)
2008	"Let It Go"	B-Side to "F UR X"	Sway (featuring Tension & Loick Essien)
2009	"We Can Do Anything"	Catch Me If You Can	Bashy (featuring Jamelia & Loick Essien)
2012	"Londoner"	London Boy	Chip (featuring Wretch 32, Professor Green & Loick Essien)
