= Through the Night (Drumsound & Bassline Smith song) =

Single by Drumsound & Bassline Smith featuring Tom Cane

from the album Wall of Sound
- Released: 29 July 2012
- Recorded: 2011–12
- Genre: Dance, drum and bass
- Length: 2:52 (radio edit); 5:18 (club mix)
- Label: New State Music
- Songwriter(s): Thomas Havelock, Andy Wright, Simon Smith

Drumsound & Bassline Smith singles chronology
"What Can You Do for Me" (2012)	"Through the Night" (2012)	"Daylight" (2012)

Tom Cane singles chronology
"Through the Night" (2012)	"Starting Again" (2013)

"Through the Night" is a single release by British electronic production group Drumsound & Bassline Smith featuring vocals from Tom Cane. It was included in their 2013 album Wall of Sound. The song was released on 29 July 2012. The song peaked at number 34 on the UK Singles Chart.

== Music video ==
A music video to accompany the release of "Through the Night" was first released onto YouTube on 9 July 2012 at a total length of three minutes and four seconds. As of March 2016 it has received more than 1.6 million views.

== Track listing ==
Digital download
No.	Title	Length
1.	"Through the Night" (Radio Edit)	2:52
2.	"Through the Night" (Club Mix)	5:18
3.	"Through the Night" (Bare Noize Remix)	4:50
4.	"Through the Night" (501 Remix)	4:48
5.	"Through the Night" (Marco V Remix)	6:38
6.	"Through the Night" (Shadow Child Remix)	6:07
7.	"Through the Night" (Horx & P3000 Remix)	4:38

== Chart performance ==
Chart (2012)	Peak position
Scotland (OCC)	39
UK Dance (OCC)	9
UK Indie (OCC)	1
UK Singles (OCC)	34

== Release history ==
Region	Date	Format	Label
United Kingdom	July 29, 2012	Digital download	New State Music
