= All I Know (Matrix & Futurebound song) =

Single by Matrix & Futurebound featuring Luke Bingham
- Released: 6 May 2012
- Recorded: 2011
- Genre: Drum and bass
- Length: 3:15
- Label: Viper Recordings, Metro Recordings
- Songwriter(s): Luke Bingham, Brendan Collins, Jamie Quinn

Matrix & Futurebound singles chronology
"Shanghai Surprise" (2008)	"All I Know" (2012)	"Magnetic Eyes" (2012)

Luke Bingham singles chronology
"All I Know" (2012)	"Gemini" (2012)

"All I Know" is a song by British drum and bass production duo Matrix & Futurebound, featuring the vocals of Luke Bingham. The song was released in the United Kingdom on 6 May 2012 for digital download.

== Music video ==
A music video to accompany the release of "All I Know" was first released onto YouTube on 23 April 2012 at a total length of three minutes and twenty-two seconds. As of March 2016 it has received over 3 million views.

== Track listings ==
Digital download
No.	Title	Length
1.	"All I Know" (Matrix & Futurebound Rolling Out Radio Mix)	3:15
2.	"All I Know" (Matrix & Futurebound Smash & Grab Mix)	4:06
3.	"All I Know" (Seven Lions Mix)	3:53
4.	"All I Know" (Alex Kenji Mix)	6:13
5.	"All I Know" (Matrix & Futurebound Rolling Out DJ Mix)	4:20

== Chart performance ==
Chart (2012)	Peak position
Scotland (OCC)	36
UK Dance (OCC)	6
UK Singles (OCC)	29

== Release history ==
Region	Date	Format	Label
United Kingdom	6 May 2012	Digital download	Viper Recordings, Metro Recordings
