= Fearless (Fleur East album) =

2020 studio album by Fleur East

Studio album by Fleur East
- Released: 20 March 2020
- Genre: R&B
- Length: 40:44
- Label: Platinum East Ingrooves

Fleur East chronology
Love, Sax and Flashbacks (2015)	Fearless (2020)

Singles from Fearless
- 1. "Favourite Thing" Released: 4 January 2019; 2. "Figured Out" Released: 4 October 2019; 3. "Size" Released: 18 November 2019; 4. "Lucky" Released: 31 January 2020; 5. "Mine" Released: 20 March 2020

Fearless (stylised in all caps) is the second studio album by English singer, songwriter, and rapper Fleur East, released on 20 March 2020 by her own label Platinum East & distributed by INgrooves.

The album was supported by the release of five singles. The lead single, "Favourite Thing", was released on 4 January 2019 and peaked at number 80 on the UK singles chart, marking East's second entry on the chart. The second single titled "Figured Out" was released on 4 October 2019. The third single, "Size" was released on 8 November 2019 and featured on the final Debenhams Christmas advert before the store's closing. The fourth single "Lucky" was released on 31 January 2020, followed by the fifth single "Mine" on 20 March 2020 alongside the album's release.

The album was scheduled to be supported by East's first headline tour The Fearless Experience, but this was postponed due to the COVID-19 pandemic.

== Singles ==
The lead single, "Favourite Thing", was released on 4 January 2019. A music video was also released the same day. The song peaked at number 80 on the UK singles chart marking East's second entry on the chart.

The second single, "Figured Out", was released on 4 October 2019 along with a music video.

On 18 November 2019, a third single, "Size", was released through Platinum East/BMG Label. The song also featured on the final Debenhams Christmas advert before the store's closing.

On 31 January 2020, the fourth single, "Lucky", was announced with an album pre-order.

The fifth single "Mine" was released on 20 March 2020 alongside the album and a music video to promote the album.

== Track listing ==
Fearless track listing
No.	Title	Writer(s)	Producer(s)	Length
1.	"Easy to Love"	Fleur East; Tayla Parx	M-Phazes	3:19
2.	"Lucky"	East; Oladayo Olatunji; James Essien; Orkhan Oryjov; Jacqueline Pelham-Leigh	Okan	3:35
3.	"There She Go"	East; William Scott; Oryjov; Tanika Bailey	Will Alaneme; Connor Patterson; Iman; Aaron Brown; Kat Deal	3:24
4.	"Size"	East; Bryn Christopher; Chiara Hunter; Tre Jean-Marie; Jacob Attwool	Jean-Marie; Attwool	2:15
5.	"On and On"	East; Jem Cooke; Lei Jennings	Okan	2:56
6.	"Mine"	East; Daniel Shah	Billen Ted	3:18
7.	"No Boy No Cry"	East; Jimmy Harry	Maestro	2:59
8.	"Things I Should've Said"	East; Nia Ekanem; Syon; Savannah	Lloyd Hinselwood; Simone D'Avenia	3:10
9.	"Figured Out"	East; Olatunji; Essien; Darren Brown	Okan	3:04
10.	"Fame"	East; Aaron Cowan	Pantha	2:23
11.	"Who You Are" (featuring Nia Ekanem)	East; Ekanem; Michael Gromley	Hinselwood; D'Avenia	3:39
12.	"Favourite Thing"	East; Olatunji; Philip Plested; George Tizzard; Richard Parkhouse	Red Triangle	3:14
13.	"Absence Speaks Louder Than Words"	East; Scott	JPL; Chris; Joeph Ross	3:27
Total length:				40:44
