= Drumsound & Bassline Smith =

British drum and bass production duo

- Also known as: Future Tech, 2db
- Origin: Derby, England
- Genres: Electronic, drum and bass, dubstep
- Occupations: DJs, producers
- Years active: 1998–present
- Labels: Technique Recordings, Worldwide Audio Recordings, New State Music
- Members: Andrew Wright; Benjamin Wiggett; Simon Smith
- Website: drumsoundandbasslinesmith.com www.techniquerecordings.co.uk

Drumsound & Bassline Smith are a British electronic music production group, consisting of Andy Wright and Ben Wiggett (the duo known as Drumsound) along with Simon 'Bassline' Smith. They met at one of Derby's club nights in the summer of 1998. Their record label is Technique Recordings, which celebrated its twentieth anniversary in 2019.

== Career ==
Drumsound were founded in the mid-late 90s in Derby. Andy and Ben met and were prolific in writing dub plates and djing at ‘Technique’ nightclub in the city, a mecca for junglists and breakbeat fans. Their first dub plate was played at the club to a rapturous reception with many rewinds.

In 2004, their "Odyssey" banger was judged Mixmag's tenth best all-round dance anthem of the year, and hit No. 1 on the UK Dance Chart. They have released tracks on a string of some of the most respected imprints in drum and bass, including on LTJ Bukem's Good Looking Records, Bryan G's V Records and Grooverider's Prototype Records.

Also, in 2004, Drumsound & Bassline Smith released their first studio album, Nature of the Beast, featuring "Crossfire (Danger)", "Planet Mars", "The End" and "Tinman", on Technique Recordings.

They enjoy regular plays on BBC Radio 1 and BBC Radio 1Xtra from Fabio and Grooverider, MistaJam, Annie Nightingale and Annie Mac. The trio are one of the few complete multiple mixes for BBC Radio One.

The 10 Years of Technique album included the "Can You Feel It", "Clap Your Hands" and "Law of the Jungle", and reached No. 1 on the BBC Radio 1 and 1Xtra charts at the end of November 2009. 2009 remixes included VV Browns "Leave"' at the request of Universal's Island Records and Fugative's – Supafly for Ministry of sound.

Annie Mac requested the crew complete a remix of Chipmunk's "Oopsy Daisy" for her Mash Hitz segment. They also did a remix of the EastEnders theme for the E20 Music Competition set up by the BBC.

In 2010, Drumsound & Bassline Smith remixed work by Blame feat Ruff Squad, and mixed "Until You Were Gone" by Chipmunk featuring Esmée Denters. The group have also completed a remix of Afrojack featuring Eva Simons' "Take Over Control" on Data Records, and produced tracks on the Dansette Junior album on Columbia Records.

In April 2011, Drumsound & Bassline Smith released a 12" of "Freak" on the Newstate label. "Freak" gained positive reviews and made BBC Radio 1's daytime playlist. Soon afterwards they remixed DJ Fresh's "Louder" which was released on 3 July 2011. The song features vocals from Welsh singer Sian Evans from the band Kosheen and hit the Number 1 spot in the UK Singles Chart. Other remixes include Moby's "After" & Youngman MC's "Who Knows".

The trio then released "Close" on 21 August 2011. The single was supported by MistaJam and Annie Mac on BBC Radio 1 promoted to BBC Radio 1 B-list and it peaked on the UK Singles Chart at number 49.

In 2012, Drumsound & Bassline Smith collaborated with Utah Saints on their classic track "What Can You Do for Me" which made the BBC Radio 1 daytime playlist & hit the number 28 spot on the UK Singles Chart on 4 March.

Also in March 2012, Drumsound & Bassline Smith won the Best Track & Best Video awards with "Close" at the Official Drum & Bass Awards.

Drumsound & Bassline Smith released their second studio album Wall of Sound on 14 July 2013. The album contains many of their unreleased work and features the singles "Through the Night", "Daylight", "One in a Million", "What Can You Do for Me", "Close" and a VIP mix of "Freak".

In 2016, they remixed the track "Pump" by Tantrum Desire and released the song "I'm Gone".

They announced their third full-length studio album, Wardance, with the release of the album sampler and single "Come with Me" in October 2017.

== Discography ==
=== Albums ===
- Nature of the Beast (2004)
- Street Technique (2006)
- 10 Years of Technique LP (2009)
- Wall of Sound (2013)
- Tech 100 Retrospective (2014)
- 15 Years of Technique Album (2015)
- Wardance (2017)
- 20 Years of Technique: Remix LP (2019)
- 20 Years of Technique: 2020 Vision LP (2019)

=== Singles ===
List of singles, with selected chart positions, showing year released and album name
Year	Title	Peak chart positions				Album
Year	Title	UK	UK Dance	UK Indie	SCO	Album
2003	"Freestyle Mambo" / "Aquarius"	83	16	17	—	Non-album singles
2003	"Friday" / "If You Need Someone"	99	—	25	—	Non-album singles
2003	"Heavy FC" / "Bigheadz"	94	40	25	—	Non-album singles
2003	"Junglist"	67	6	6	—	Nature of the Beast
2003	"Get Through" / "Dangerous"	—	29	34	—	Nature of the Beast
2003	"Get Through" (Distorted Minds Remix) / "Vicious"	—	28	25	—	Nature of the Beast
2004	"Tin Man" / "Palomino (Give It to Me)"	80	—	25	—	Nature of the Beast
2004	"Odyssey" / "Body Moving"	66	9	9	—	Nature of the Beast
2004	"Reverence" / "Nightmares"	93	14	22	—	Non-album single
2004	"Tyrant" / "West Bank"	83	5	17	—	Nature of the Beast
2011	"Freak"	—	39	33	—	Wall of Sound
2011	"Close"	49	—	7	67	Wall of Sound
2012	"What Can You Do for Me" (WCYDFM) (Utah Saints vs. Drumsound & Bassline Smith)	28	7	3	28	Wall of Sound
2012	"Through the Night" (featuring Tom Cane)	34	9	1	39	Wall of Sound
2012	"Daylight" (featuring Hadouken!)	—	—	—	—	Wall of Sound
2013	"One in a Million" (featuring Fleur)	53	14	7	61	Wall of Sound
2013	"Atmosphere" (featuring Sam Frank)	—	—	—	—	Wall of Sound
2015	"Come Alive" (featuring Youngman)	—	—	—	—	Non-album singles
2015	"Fearless" (featuring Stealth and LCGC)	—	—	—	—	Non-album singles
2015	"The Truth"	—	—	—	—	Non-album singles
2015	"Outlaw Renegade"	—	—	—	—	Non-album singles
2016	"I'm Gone" (featuring Bully)	—	—	—	—	Non-album singles
2016	"Catch Me Here" (featuring Conor Maynard)	—	—	—	—	Non-album singles
2016	"Shutdown"	—	—	—	—	Non-album singles
2017	"Thug Killer"	—	—	—	—	Non-album singles
2017	"Come with Me"	—	—	—	—	Wardance
2018	"Jungle All the Way"	—	—	—	—	Kilimanjaro
2018	"Kilimanjaro"	—	—	—	—	Kilimanjaro
2018	"Lose My Head"	—	—	—	—	Kilimanjaro
2018	"Dubplate"	—	—	—	—	Kilimanjaro
2018	"Metal & Blood" (with Teddy Killerz)	—	—	—	—	Non-album singles
2018	"Superfunk"	—	—	—	—	Non-album singles
2018	"The Bomb" (with Tantrum Desire)	—	—	—	—	Non-album singles
2019	"Bloodclaaart"	—	—	—	—	Non-album singles
2019	"Last Forever"	—	—	—	—	Non-album singles
2020	"Nexus / Power of the Future"	—	—	—	—	Non-album singles
2020	"Ecstacy"	—	—	—	—	Non-album singles
2020	"I Can Never Get Enough"	—	—	—	—	Non-album singles
2020	"Run Tings"	—	—	—	—	Non-album singles
2020	"Feeling Good"	—	—	—	—	Non-album singles
2020	"Feel It"	—	—	—	—	Non-album singles
2021	"Gunman"	—	—	—	—	Non-album singles
2021	"Bad Boy Sound"	—	—	—	—	Non-album singles
2021	"Give It to Me"	—	—	—	—	Non-album singles
2021	"Jungle Dreams"	—	—	—	—	Non-album singles
2021	"Sanctuary '93"	—	—	—	—	Non-album singles
2021	"Music Soldier"	—	—	—	—	Music Soldier
2022	"Galaxy Dub"	—	—	—	—	Music Soldier
2022	"Be Mine"	—	—	—	—	Shades of Rhythm
2023	"Jungle Dub (Here Comes)"	—	—	—	—	Shades of Rhythm
2023	"Pump It Up"	—	—	—	—	Shades of Rhythm
2023	"Underground Warriors"	—	—	—	—	Shades of Rhythm
2023	"Break Your Heart"	—	—	—	—	Shades of Rhythm
2023	"Jungle Tekno"	—	—	—	—	
"—" denotes single that did not chart or was not released.

=== Other releases ===
==== as Future Tech ====
- 1999 – "Future Tech" / "Target Practice" [Technique Recordings]
- 1999 – "Tunnel Vision" / "Explosive" [Technique Recordings]
- 2000 – "Plutonium" / "Zeus" [Technique Recordings]
- 2000 – "Distortion" / "Jungle Fever" [Technique Recordings]
- 2001 – "Tribal Warfare" / "Apollo Creed" [Technique Recordings]
- 2001 – "Mudslide" / "Matchstick" [Technique Recordings]
- 2001 – "Future Tech" (Remix) (from The X Project – Part 1) [Technique Recordings]
- 2001 – "Tidal Wave" (from The X Project – Part 2) [Technique Recordings]
- 2002 – "Kashmir" (from The X Project – Part 3) [Technique Recordings]
- 2002 – "Grand Theft Auto" / "Touch Me" [Technique Recordings]
- 2002 – "Indian Summer" (from The Planets EP) [Technique Recordings]
- 2003 – "Gangster Boogie" / "Spring in Paris" [Technique Recordings]
- 2003 – "Turn Up the Bass" / "Rhythm" [Worldwide Audio Recordings]

==== as 2db ====
- 2002 – "Pickpocket" / "Killer" [Grid Recordings]
- 2003 – "Oscillator" / "Circle Square" [Worldwide Audio Recordings]
- 2004 – "Musical" / "Punch Drunk" [Worldwide Audio Recordings]
- 2005 – "Phatt Beat" / "Do It to Me Baby" [Worldwide Audio Recordings]
- 2006 – "Tequila Slammer" / "Legacy" [Worldwide Audio Recordings]
- 2008 – "Go Girl" / "Starsign" [Worldwide Audio Recordings]
- 2009 – "Turkish Delight" / "Speed Freak" [Worldwide Audio Recordings]
- 2011 – "Original Soundsystem Style" / "JD's Revenge" [Technique Recordings]
- 2011 – "Swerve" / "1995" [Worldwide Audio Recordings]
- 2012 – "Virus" (from Crossfire EP) [Technique Recordings]
- 2012 – "Amiga Man" / "Happy Days" [Technique Recordings]
- 2012 – Break the Walls EP [Technique Recordings]
- 2012 – "Ghetto Boy" / "Blunderbus" [Technique Recordings]
- 2013 – "Bassface" / "Jet Black" [Technique Recordings]
- 2013 – "Oxygen" / "Spud Gun" (from Crossfire EP 2) [Technique Recordings]
- 2013 – Motion EP [Technique Recordings]
