= How We Roll (Loick Essien song) =

Single by Loick Essien featuring Tanya Lacey

from the album Identity
- Released: July 1, 2011
- Recorded: 2010
- Genre: R&B, hip hop
- Length: 3:33
- Label: Sony Music Entertainment
- Songwriter(s): Loick Essien, Tanya Lacey, L Marshall
- Producer(s): White N3rd

Loick Essien singles chronology
"Stuttering" (2010)	"How We Roll" (2011)	"Me Without You" (2011)

Tanya Lacey singles chronology
"How We Roll" (2011)	"Letter to My Ex / Born to Fly" (2011)

Music video
- "How We Roll" on YouTube

"How We Roll" is a song by English R&B singer Loick Essien, featuring vocals from English singer Tanya Lacey, released from his debut album Identity. It was released on 1 July 2011 on Sony Music Entertainment. The song entered the UK Singles Chart at number 2.

== Music video ==
A music video was made for the single and was uploaded to YouTube on 4 May 2011. The video features a Tanya running from two thugs and is given a ride by Loick who rescues her from the two men and rides away with him losing them. The video cuts to a part where Loick runs into his apartment and grabs some things with the two men from before pursuing him. Loick jumps out of the window and meets Tanya outside. The thugs find that they are escaping and rush to the car to chase them. The two are trapped when they run into a blocked road alley and the thugs quickly catch them. However, when the two take their helmets off, the two are revealed to be look alikes who pretended to be Loick and Tanya; the two men find out that they have been tricked and the video cuts back to the motorbike scene where Loick and Tanya give their motorbike to the look alikes. The video then ends with Loick and Tanya walking away happily.

== Track listing ==
Digital download

1. "How We Roll" (feat. Tanya Lacey) - 3:33
2. "How We Roll" (feat. Tanya Lacey) [Music video] - 3:30

== Chart performance ==
=== Weekly charts ===
Chart (2011)	Peak position
Ireland (IRMA)	49
Scotland (OCC)	6
UK Hip Hop/R&B (OCC)	1
UK Singles (OCC)	2

=== Year-end charts ===
Chart (2011)	position
UK Singles (Official Charts Company)	93

== Release history ==
Region	Date	Format	Label
United Kingdom	1 July 2011	Digital download	Sony Music Entertainment
