= Don't Look Back (Matrix & Futurebound song) =

Single by Matrix & Futurebound featuring Tanya Lacey
- Released: 6 July 2014
- Recorded: 2014
- Genre: Drum and bass
- Length: 4:00
- Label: 3Beat
- Songwriter(s): Jamie Quinn; Brendan Collins; Tanya Lacey
- Producer(s): Matrix & Futurebound

Matrix & Futurebound singles chronology
"Control" (2013)	"Don't Look Back" (2014)

Tanya Lacey singles chronology
"Now That You're Gone" (2013)	"Don't Look Back" (2014)

"Don't Look Back" is a song by English drum and bass production duo Matrix & Futurebound. It was released on 6 July 2014. The song entered at number 38 on the UK Singles Chart.

== Track listing ==
Digital download - single
No.	Title	Length
1.	"Don't Look Back" (featuring Tanya Lacey)	4:00

Digital download - EP
No.	Title	Length
1.	"Don't Look Back" (Matrix & Futurebound Remix)	3:55
2.	"Don't Look Back" (Koncept Remix)	4:17
3.	"Don't Look Back" (Stadiumx Remix)	5:24
4.	"Don't Look Back" (Apexx Remix)	6:51
5.	"Don't Look Back" (Artful Vocal Remix)	4:51

== Chart performance ==
=== Weekly charts ===
Chart (2014)	Peak position
Scotland (OCC)	29
UK Dance (OCC)	12
UK Singles (OCC)	38

== Release history ==
Country	Release date	Format
Worldwide	6 July 2014	Digital download

== Music video ==
Two Irish models Sarah Tansey and Thalia Heffernan featured in the music video.
