= Sax (song) =

2015 debut single by Fleur East

Single by Fleur East

from the album Love, Sax and Flashbacks
- Released: 6 November 2015
- Recorded: 2015
- Genre: Dance-pop; funk; hip hop soul
- Length: 3:56
- Label: Syco
- Songwriters: Fleur East; Edvard Førre Erfjord; Henrik Michelsen; James Abrahart; Camille Purcell
- Producers: Electric; Afterhrs

Fleur East singles chronology
"Could You Be the One" (2014)	"Sax" (2015)	"More and More" (2016)

Music video
- "Sax" on YouTube

"Sax" is the debut single by English singer, rapper and songwriter Fleur East, from her debut album Love, Sax and Flashbacks (2015). It was released as the lead single from the album on 6 November 2015 by Syco Records.

The song was a commercial success, peaking at number 3 in the UK. In September 2016, "Sax" was certified platinum by the BPI.

== Background ==
After finishing as the runner-up of the 11th series of The X Factor, East signed a recording contract with Syco Music in January 2015. She began working on her debut studio album after participating in the X Factor tour, splitting her time between London and Los Angeles to record it. During recording, she was inspired by "Uptown Funk" by Mark Ronson featuring Bruno Mars, and described the songs on the album as "very uptempo and very energetic with lots of attitude. [The album has] got loads of influences from the old school. Lots of funk, hip-hop, soul; loads of different sounds fused together. Everything about that song - the uptempo vibe, the high energy, the brass, the old school funk sound - was just right up my street. I've definitely taken a few influences from that."

In July 2015, Syco's head Simon Cowell told The Sun: "I've heard it and it's world class. She has discovered who she wanted to be. Sometimes you just spot someone who's not obvious and Fleur's a good example of that". "Sax" was originally slated for release on 23 October 2015, then on 30 October, before being finally released on 6 November 2015 to coincide with her performance of the song on X Factor.

== Critical reception ==
Digital Spy's writer Lewis Corner noted that the song was clearly inspired by "Uptown Funk", but its "brassed-up chorus, sassy lyrics and funky hook means it stands tall as a potential smash hit in its own right".

== Music video ==
The official music video for "Sax" was released on 26 November 2015. It was directed by Colin Tilley. It shows East smiling and walking in a five-colour square tunnel, and later shows her with some dancers in a colourful changing background. On 15 June 2016, another music video, titled "Sax in the City", was released for the song. It features East in different parts of New York City.

== Live performances ==
"Sax" was first performed by East on Oxford Street Christmas lights switch-on event on 1 November 2015. She also performed it on the 12th series of The X Factor on 8 November. She performed the track on Alan Carr: Chatty Man on 20 November 2015, and also performed on The One Show on 27 November 2015, East returned to the final of the 12th series of The X Factor where she performed with girlband Little Mix, along with their song "Black Magic". On 25 December, East performed "Sax" on the Christmas special of Top of the Pops.

For her US debut, East performed "Sax" on the season finale of Dancing with the Stars on 25 May 2016. The following day, she performed the single on The Late Late Show with James Corden. On 2 June 2016, she made her debut on The Today Show where she was interviewed by Tamron Hall and Al Roker and performed the single.

== Track listing ==
Digital download

1. "Sax" – 3:56

Digital download – The Selection EP

1. "Sax" (Dance Rehearsal) [Video] – 3:56
2. "Sax" (Wideboys Remix) – 4:02
3. "Sax" (LuvBug Remix) – 3:36
4. "Sax" (Steve Smart Remix) – 3:34
5. "Sax" (Interview) – 3:57

Other version

"Sax" (Wideboys Club Mix) – 6:05

== Charts ==
=== Weekly charts ===
Weekly chart performance for "Sax"
Chart (2015–2016)	Peak position
Australia (ARIA)	25
Austria (Ö3 Austria Top 40)	41
Belgium (Ultratop 50 Flanders)	25
Belgium (Ultratip Bubbling Under Wallonia)	1
Czech Republic Airplay (ČNS IFPI)	99
Czech Republic Singles Digital (ČNS IFPI)	43
Finland (Suomen virallinen latauslista)	20
France (SNEP)	200
Germany (GfK)	42
Hungary (Rádiós Top 40)	1
Hungary (Dance Top 40)	18
Hungary (Single Top 40)	4
Ireland (IRMA)	5
Israel International Airplay (Media Forest)	8
Netherlands (Dutch Top 40)	19
Netherlands (Single Top 100)	35
Poland Airplay (ZPAV)	50
Scottish Singles Sales (Official Charts)	2
Slovakia Airplay (ČNS IFPI)	41
Spain (Promusicae)	24
Sweden Heatseeker (Sverigetopplistan)	8
UK Singles (Official Charts)	3

=== Year-end charts ===
Year-end chart performance for "Sax"
Chart (2015)	Position
UK Singles (OCC)	87
Chart (2016)	Position
Hungary (Dance Top 40)	59
Hungary (Rádiós Top 40)	2

== Certifications ==
Certifications for "Sax"
Region	Certification	Certified units/sales
Australia (ARIA)	Gold	35,000^{‡}
Mexico (AMPROFON)	Gold	30,000^{‡}
New Zealand (RMNZ)	Gold	15,000^{‡}
Spain (Promusicae)	Gold	30,000^{‡}
United Kingdom (BPI)	Platinum	600,000^{‡}
^{‡} Sales+streaming figures based on certification alone.
