= Love Drunk (Loick Essien song) =

Single by Loick Essien

from the album Identity
- Released: September 12, 2010
- Genre: R&B
- Length: 3:28; 4:23 (remix featuring Bashy)
- Label: Sony Music Entertainment
- Songwriter(s): Loick Essien
- Producer(s): Labrinth

Loick Essien singles chronology
"Love Drunk" (2010)	"Stuttering" (2011)

"Love Drunk" is a song and debut single by R&B singer Loick Essien, released on 12 September 2010 by Sony Music Entertainment. Featuring uncredited vocals from Labrinth, it was the first single released from Essien's debut album Identity. The song entered the UK Singles Chart at number 57. The remix version features British rapper Bashy.

== Music video ==
The video was filmed in London September 2010. It was uploaded to YouTube on 16 January 2011.

== Track listing ==
Digital download
No.	Title	Length
1.	"Love Drunk"	3:28
2.	"Love Drunk" (featuring Bashy)	4:23

== Chart performance ==
Chart (2010)	Peak position
UK Hip Hop/R&B (OCC)	15
UK Singles (OCC)	56

== Release history ==
Region	Date	Format	Label
United Kingdom	12 September 2010	Digital download	Sony Music Entertainment
