= One in a Million (Drumsound & Bassline Smith song) =

Single by Drumsound & Bassline Smith featuring Fleur

from the album Wall of Sound
- Released: 21 April 2013
- Recorded: 2012
- Genre: Drum and bass
- Length: 2:51
- Label: New State Music
- Songwriter(s): Andy Wright; Simon Smith; Fleur
- Producer(s): Drumsound & Bassline Smith

Drumsound & Bassline Smith singles chronology
"Daylight" (2012)	"One in a Million" (2013)	"Atmosphere" (2013)

Fleur singles chronology
"The One" (2012)	"One in a Million" (2013)	"Around and Around" (2014)

"One in a Million" is a single release by British electronic production group Drumsound & Bassline Smith, featuring vocals from Fleur East. The song was released on 21 April 2013. The song has peaked to number 53 on the UK Singles Chart and number 14 on the UK Dance Chart.

== Music video ==
A music video to accompany the release of "One in a Million" was first released onto YouTube on 27 March 2013 at a total length of three minutes and seven seconds. As of March 2016 it has received more than 740,000 views.

== Track listing ==
Digital download - Single
No.	Title	Length
1.	"One in a Million" (Radio Edit) (featuring Fleur)	2:51

Digital download - EP
No.	Title	Length
1.	"One in a Million" (Radio Edit)	2:51
2.	"One in a Million" (Club Mix)	4:08
3.	"One in a Million" (Tantrum Desire Remix)	4:27
4.	"One in a Million" (Wideboys Club Remix)	5:07
5.	"One in a Million" (Northern Lights Remix)	5:41
6.	"One in a Million" (Reset Safari's 'Lost in '97' Remix)	7:50

== Chart performance ==
=== Weekly charts ===
Chart (2013)	Peak position
UK Dance (OCC)	14
UK Singles (Official Charts Company)	53

== Release history ==
Region	Date	Format	Label
United Kingdom	21 April 2013	Digital download	New State Music
