= Max Marshall (singer) =

American-British singer (born 1991)

- Born: 10 July 1991 (age 34); Baltimore, Maryland, United States
- Genres: Pop
- Occupation: Singer
- Years active: 2012–present
- Label: Fudge Recordings

Maxine Marshall (born 10 July 1991), is an American British singer from Baltimore who lives in London. She is best known for featuring on Matrix & Futurebound's 2013 single "Control", which peaked at number seven on the UK Singles Chart in January 2014.

== Early life ==
Marshall was born in Baltimore, where her dad was a tour agent for acts such as Earth, Wind & Fire, and Ashford & Simpson, and her mother was a music teacher who taught Tupac Shakur. She learned to play the viola, violin and guitar as a teenager, and decided she wanted to be a musician aged 14. She initially began recording music without her parents' knowledge. On her 18th birthday, she moved to East London to focus on her music career, where she also studied fashion.

In London, Marshall worked for Charlie Le Mindu, a French stylist and haute couture designer, where she made a piano wig for Lady Gaga. Marshall continued to book gigs and, in 2013, distributed her self-produced mixtape, Forgive Me, featuring covers of R&B and hip-hop songs. Marshall was signed to Universal after her manager heard her song "Pop" on GarageBand.

== Music career ==
=== 2013–present: Breakthrough ===
On 12 July 2013, Max Marshall released her debut single "Don't Trip". On 4 October 2013, she released her debut EP Pressure with Fudge Records.

In late-2013, she featured on Matrix & Futurebound's single "Control". The single entered at number 18 on the UK Singles Chart on 5 January 2014 – for the week ending dated 11 January 2014 – before going on to peak at number seven on the chart the following week, becoming Matrix & Futurebound's biggest hit. The song peaked at number 4 on the UK Dance Chart and was certified gold by the BPI.

On 12 May 2014, Marshall released "Your Love Is Like". Choosing the track for The Guardian's Pick of the Week column, Joe Bish described the song as "a real swooner". Flavour described it as "an example of her extraordinary, soulful voice and ear for addictive melodies". On 30 May 2014, she premiered "Yesterday".

In 2021, she collaborated within Jethro Heston on "Cut Me Loose". The track was also certified gold by the BPI.

== Discography ==
=== Extended plays ===
Title	EP details
Pressure	Released: 4 October 2013; Label: Fudge Recordings; Format: Digital Download

=== Singles ===
==== As lead artist ====
Title	Year	Peak chart positions	Certifications	Album
Title	Year	UK	Certifications	Album
"Don't Trip"	2013	—		Non-album single
"Cut Me Loose" (2021 edit) with Jethro Heston	2021	63	BPI: Gold	Non-album single
"—" denotes a recording that did not chart or was not released in that territory.

==== As featured artist ====
Title	Year	Peak chart positions			Certifications	Album
Title	Year	UK	UK Dance	SCO	Certifications	Album
"Control" (Matrix & Futurebound featuring Max Marshall)	2013	7	2	7	BPI: Gold	Mystery Machine
"Fire" (Matrix & Futurebound featuring Max Marshall)	2015	—	—	—		Mystery Machine
"Chase Your Trip" (Illyus & Barrientos featuring Max Marshall)	2015	—	—	—		Non-album single
"—" denotes a recording that did not chart or was not released in that territory.
