= Aura Mayfair =

Coordinates: 51°30′27″N 0°8′26″W

Aura Mayfair was a nightclub located on St James's Street in Mayfair, London.

In 2010, Tony Fernandes led a consortium that took over the club. The club was owned by Merlot 73 Ltd, in which Fernandes had a 30% stake, and run by Alberto Barbieri.

Notable guests included Rihanna, James Arthur, Drake, Ne-Yo, Tamara Ecclestone and Usher. In January 2011, Madonna was rumoured to be buying into the club after numerous visits and meetings with owners.

Merlot 73 Ltd went into liquidation and was dissolved on 27 July 2016.
