= Ben Haenow =

English singer and songwriter (born 1985)

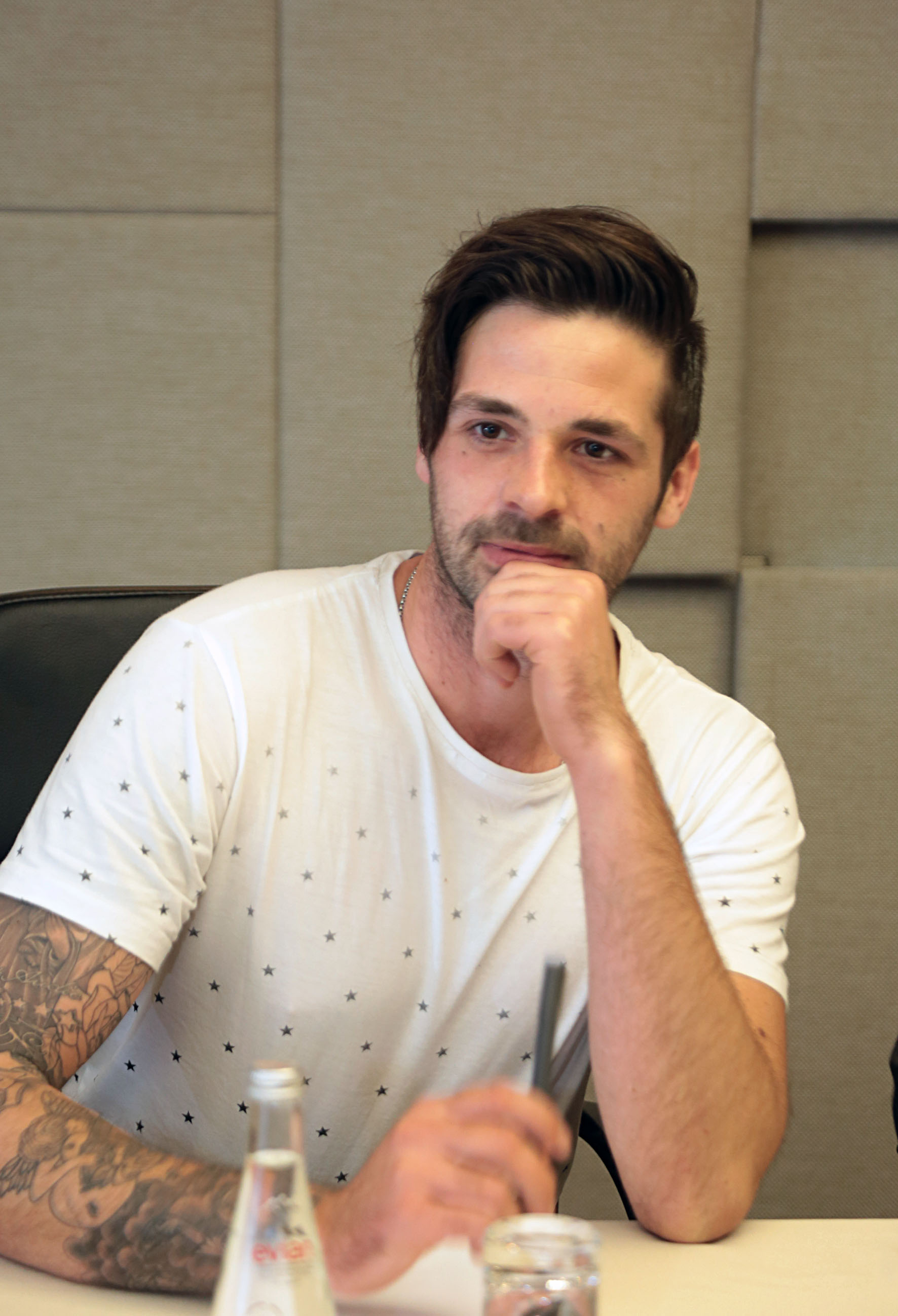
- Haenow in Gibraltar in 2016

Background information
- Born: Benjamin Bernard Haenow; 6 January 1985 (age 41); Croydon, England
- Genres: Pop; rock
- Occupations: Singer; Songwriter
- Instruments: Vocals; guitar
- Years active: 2014–present
- Labels: Syco; RCA

Benjamin Bernard Haenow (born 6 January 1985) is an English singer and songwriter. In 2014, he was crowned as the winner of the eleventh series of The X Factor UK after beating Fleur East. Following his win, his debut single, a cover of OneRepublic's "Something I Need", was released in December 2014. It debuted at number one on the UK Singles Chart, becoming the 2014 Christmas number one. Haenow released his self-titled debut studio album in November 2015, preceded by the single "Second Hand Heart", a duet with Kelly Clarkson.

== Early years ==
Ben Haenow was born on 6 January 1985 in Croydon, England, to parents Mick and Rosanna Haenow (née Ward). He has an older brother named Alex. Their parents split when Ben was four years old, forcing his mother to work three jobs to make ends meet. When he was 14 years old, Ben suffered depression and drank a bottle of vodka a day until he was "sick and paralytic".

Haenow has sung in bands since he was 15 and formed the rock and roll band the Lost Audio with Alex in 2006. Before auditioning for The X Factor, he was employed as a van driver.

== Career ==
=== 2014: The X Factor and career beginnings ===
On 26 June 2014, Haenow auditioned in Newcastle for the eleventh series of The X Factor. After singing Bill Withers' "Ain't No Sunshine" in his room audition, he received four "yes" votes and progressed through to the arena auditions. He sang The Rolling Stones' "Wild Horses" at the arena and progressed to "bootcamp". Haenow was placed in the "Over 26s" category at "bootcamp" and was mentored by Simon Cowell. He successfully made it through to "judges' houses" and was later chosen by Cowell for the live shows, along with Jay James and eventual runner-up Fleur East (as well as eventual wildcard Stevi Ritchie).

Along with East, he was never in the bottom two and eventually made it to the live final. Haenow was announced as the winner on 14 December 2014. When the voting statistics were announced, Haenow was revealed to have received the most public votes from week four to ten.

The X Factor performances and results (2014)
Episode	Theme	Song	Result
Room audition	Free choice	"Ain't No Sunshine"	Through to arena
Arena audition	Free choice	"Wild Horses"	Through to bootcamp
Bootcamp	Free choice	"Hotel California"	Through to judges' houses
Judges houses	Free choice	"With a Little Help from My Friends"	Through to live shows
Live show 1	Number ones	"Bridge over Troubled Water"	Safe (4th)
Live show 2	1980s music	"Jealous Guy"	Safe (4th)
Live show 3	Songs from films	"I Don't Want to Miss a Thing"	Safe (3rd)
Live show 4	Halloween	"Highway to Hell"	Safe (1st)
Live show 5	Queen vs. Michael Jackson	"Man in the Mirror"	Safe (1st)
Live show 6	Big band	"Cry Me a River"	Safe (1st)
Live show 7	Whitney Houston vs. Elton John	"I Will Always Love You"	Safe (1st)
Quarter-Final	Songs chosen by other artists	"Come Together"	Safe (1st)
Quarter-Final	Jukebox	"Thinking Out Loud"	Safe (1st)
Semi-Final	Christmas	"Please Come Home for Christmas"	Safe (1st)
Semi-Final	Song to get you to the final	"Hallelujah"	Safe (1st)
Final	No theme	"Demons"	Safe (1st)
Final	Celebrity duets	"Thinking Out Loud" (with Ed Sheeran)	Safe (1st)
Final	Song of the series	"Man in the Mirror"	Winner (1st)
Final	Winner's single	"Something I Need"	Winner (1st)

On 15 December 2014, the day after he won the show, Haenow released his winner's single, a cover of OneRepublic's "Something I Need", via digital download. On 17 December, the single received a physical release, which features three of Haenow's best X Factor performances – "Jealous Guy", "Highway to Hell" and "Man in the Mirror". On 18 December, "Something I Need" entered the Irish Singles Chart at number two, finishing behind Mark Ronson's "Uptown Funk", making Haenow the first X Factor winner not to get Ireland's Christmas number one in nine years. On 21 December, the song debuted at number one on the UK Singles Chart ahead of "Uptown Funk", after selling 214,000 copies in its first week, and became the Christmas number one. The release also became the second-fastest selling single of the year, behind Band Aid 30's "Do They Know It's Christmas?", which sold nearly 313,000 copies in its first week back in November 2014.

=== 2015–2018: Debut album and Alive ===
On 6 January 2015, Haenow's 30th birthday, it was announced that he had been signed by Syco Music. He then spent several months of the year in Los Angeles recording his self-titled debut album, Ben Haenow, which was released on 13 November 2015. The lead single from the album, "Second Hand Heart", a duet with Kelly Clarkson, was released on 16 October 2015 and peaked at number 21. On 28 January 2016, Haenow confirmed that he and Syco had parted ways by way of mutual agreement.

Haenow released a new single "Alive" and on 7 July 2017. This was followed by "Forgive & Forget" on 13 October 2017 and "Rising" on 15 December 2017. Haenow revealed on his Facebook page that new single "Falling Down" would be released on 6 April 2018; he later announced on 3 May 2018 that his sophomore album, titled Alive, would be released on 25 May 2018.

== Discography ==
=== Albums ===
Title	Details	Peak chart positions				Certifications
Title	Details	UK	IRE	RSA	SCO	Certifications
Ben Haenow	Released: 13 November 2015; Label: RCA, Syco; Format: Digital download, CD	10	16	7	7	BPI: Silver
Alive	Released: 25 May 2018; Label: Ben Haenow; Format: Digital download, CD	—	—	—	—	
"—" denotes a recording that did not chart or was not released in that territory.

=== Singles ===
Title	Year	Peak chart positions				Certifications	Album
Title	Year	UK	IRE	RSA	SCO	Certifications	Album
"Something I Need"	2014	1	2	3	1	BPI: Platinum; RISA: Gold	Ben Haenow
"Second Hand Heart" (featuring Kelly Clarkson)	2015	21	56	3	4	BPI: Silver; RISA: Gold	Ben Haenow
"Alive"	2017	—	—	—	—		Alive
"Falling Down"	2017	—	—	—	—		Alive
"Heart of Glass"	2020	—	—	—	—		Non-album singles
"If You're Lonely"	2020	—	—	—	—		Non-album singles
"—" denotes a recording that did not chart or was not released in that territory.

=== Promotional singles ===
Title	Year	Album
"Forgive & Forget"	2017	Alive
"Rising"	2017	Alive

Awards and achievements
Preceded by Sam Bailey	Winner of The X Factor; 2014	Succeeded by Louisa Johnson
