= Tanya Lacey =

English singer (born 1985)

- Born: 2 March 1986 (age 40); Bristol, England
- Genres: R&B, soul, grime, dancehall, reggae, hip hop
- Occupations: Singer, songwriter, composer
- Instruments: Vocals, piano
- Years active: 2005–present
- Label: Sony Music Entertainment Laceywood Records

Tanya Una Lacey (born 2 March 1986) is an English recording artist, songwriter and composer. She is signed to the record label Sony Music. She is best known for writing and featuring on Loick Essien's single "How We Roll", which peaked at No. 2 on the UK Singles Chart. Later, Lacey supported Bruno Mars as his sole European support for The Doo-Wops & Hooligans Tour.

In 2017, she competed on The Voice UK and made it past the blind auditions, joining Team Gavin (Gavin Rossdale). In the second stage of the competition, she was eliminated from Gavin's team, but was 'stolen' by Will (will.i.am).

== Music career ==
=== 2011–13: Head Chef ===
Lacey began her musical career after featuring on rapper Tinchy Stryder's song "Spotlight" on his second album, Catch 22. She featured on, and wrote,, Loick Essien's single "How We Roll" which was released on 3 July 2011. It peaked at number 2 on the UK Singles Chart and number 49 on the Irish Singles Chart. On 2 December 2011, she released her debut single "Letter to My Ex / Born to Fly". She released her song "Greatness" on 22 July 2012 as the lead single from her EP Head Chef. On 7 October 2012 she released "Too Many Cooks" as the second single from her EP Head Chef. On 22 October 2012 she released her debut EP, Head Chef. Lacey made three appearances on renowned drum and bass artist Danny Byrd's third studio album, Golden Ticket: "Bad Monday", "Love You Like This" and "Golden Ticket". On 9 June 2013 she released the single "Now That You're Gone".

=== 2014–present ===
Lacey featured on Matrix & Futurebound's single "Don't Look Back", which was released on 6 July 2014. The song became a Top 40 hit, charting at No. 38.

In 2017 she became a competitor on The Voice UK, and joined Gavin Rossdale's team. She was voted off during the battles. She joined Will.i.am's team but was voted off a second time.

== Discography ==
=== Extended plays ===
Title	Album details
Head Chef	Release: 22 October 2012; Labels: Laceywood Records; Formats: Digital download

=== Singles ===
Year	Title	Peak chart positions	Album
Year	Title	UK	Album
2011	"Letter to My Ex / Born to Fly"	—	Breakthrough
2012	"Greatness" (featuring Kano)	—	Head Chef
2012	"Too Many Cooks"	—	Head Chef
2013	"Now That You're Gone"	—	Non-album single
"—" denotes a single that did not chart or was not released.

=== As featured artist ===
Year	Title	Peak chart positions				Album
Year	Title	UK	UK R&B	IRE	Billboard US Dance Airplay	Album
2011	"How We Roll" (Loick Essien featuring Tanya Lacey)	2	1	49		Identity
2013	"Bad Monday" (Danny Byrd featuring Tanya Lacey)	181	-	-		Golden Ticket
2014	"Don't Look Back" (Matrix & Futurebound featuring Tanya Lacey)	38				
2019	"Missing" (BODÉ featuring Tanya Lacey)				30	Missing
"—" denotes a single that did not chart or was not released.
