= Baby Blue (rapper) =

- Also known as: Baby Blue
- Born: Rachel Estelle Irene Prager
- Origin: London, England
- Genres: Hip-hop, grime, R&B, soul
- Occupations: Rapper, songwriter
- Years active: 2004–present
- Labels: 3 Beat Records, Universal
- Website: 7wmusic.com

Rachel Estelle Irene Prager, professionally known as Baby Blue, is a British rapper and songwriter from London, England. She is known for her work with singer Estelle and collaborations with John Legend, Madness, Sway, Shystie, Ms. Dynamite and Lady Sovereign. Baby Blue has a sound that fuses hip hop with grime, R&B and soul. In 2018, Prager became "Head of Music" at 7Wallace, Idris Elba's record label.

== Biography ==
Prager started rapping while at school and eventually recorded a track called "I Woulda", which was inspired by her cousin's gang-related death in the U.S.. The track received heavy rotation and was the start of Prager's career as a recording artist. When she was 19, she sent a demo of her music to UK artist Estelle, who invited her to New York City to record the song "Hey Girl" featuring John Legend, as well as "Don't Talk", another track for Estelle's début album The 18th Day, which was certified gold in the UK. Baby Blue was also featured rapping in the video for the top 20 Estelle hit "1980".

Later that year, Blue released the mixtape Out of the Blue Vol. I (with Volume II released two years later) which featured Estelle, members of So Solid Crew, Shystie, Sway, and Akala. Her first solo music video was for the single "Sometimes", which was released to push Vol. II of the mixtape. This led Mobo Magazine to dub her "The Uncrowned Queen of the UK" and MTV to list her as "one of the hottest up 'n' coming stars".

Baby Blue featured on new wave ska band Madness's comeback single "Sorry" in 2007, which went to 23 in the UK singles chart and was on the soundtrack for FIFA 08. She toured with Estelle for four months, travelling around the U.S. and Europe. She has also worked with Ms. Dynamite, Kardinal Offishall, and Idris Elba.

In 2010, in an interview with thekoalition.com, Baby Blue stated that she was working on an EP to be released in March 2010, and an album to be released later on in the same year. On 17 March that year, Baby Blue released a digital mixtape entitled Firefly. It was revealed that the title of her album would be called No Smoke Without Fire.

On 20 July 2012, Baby Blue announced via Twitter that she has been signed by 3 Beat/Universal.

On 26 July 2013, Baby Blue announced she had spent time in the recording studio with So Solid Crew singer Lisa Maffia, with each artist both contributing to forthcoming albums.

In 2018, Prager-Riel became "Head of Music" at 7Wallace, the record label founded by Idris Elba in 2015. In a joint venture with Universal Music Publishing, the company has expanded to include music publishing and has set up studios in Central London and Oxford.

== Discography ==
=== Mixtapes ===
- 2004: Out of the Blue Vol. I
- 2005: Out of the Blue Vol. II
- 2010: Firefly

=== Singles ===
==== As lead artist ====
Title	Year	Peak chart positions	Album
Title	Year	UK	Album
"Target"	2012	—	No Smoke Without Fire
"Bump"	2013	83	No Smoke Without Fire
"—" denotes single that did not chart or was not released in that territory.

==== As featured artist ====
Title	Year	Peak chart positions			Album
Title	Year	UK	UK Dance	SCO	Album
"Magnetic Eyes" (Matrix & Futurebound featuring Baby Blue)	2012	24	5	29	

=== Guest appearances ===
- "Don't Talk" and "Hey Girl" (featuring John Legend) on Estelle's album The 18th Day (2004)
