= Matrix (musician) =

- Born: Jamie Quinn
- Origin: London, England
- Genres: Dance, drum and bass, dubstep
- Occupations: Disc jockey, record producer
- Years active: 1994–present
- Labels: AATW, Viper Recordings, Metro Recordings

Jamie Quinn, better known by his stage name Matrix, is a British drum and bass producer, DJ, and founder of record label Metro Recordings in London.

== Musical career ==
=== 1994-2000: Career beginnings ===
Quinn started his musical career as one half of drum and bass duo Turbosound. The duo was signed to F Project Records, an imprint of Formation Records, operated by DJ SS. As early as 1994, Quinn began to release material as Matrix. Since then, his work has appeared on numerous compilations released by various drum and bass labels. His debut LP, Sleepwalk was released in 2000 by Virus Recordings (operated by his brother Optical).

=== 2001-2004: Goldtrix ===
In 2001, Quinn ventured into the house music genre as one half of Goldtrix. In 2002, Goldtrix released a cover of Jill Scott's "It's Love (Trippin')", featuring singer Andrea Brown. It became a number one hit on the U.S. Billboard Hot Dance Club Play chart and reached number six on the UK Singles Chart in February 2002.

=== 2005-2011: Matrix and Futurebound and debut album ===
In 2005, Quinn collaborated with Liverpool-based producer Brendan Collins known as 'Futurebound' to release their Strength 2 Strength single. They later released their debut album Universal Truth on 9 April 2007 through Metro Recordings and Viper recordings, under the alias "Matrix & Futurebound". On 10 March 2008 they released Womb as a single from the Universal Truth album later followed by a new single Shanghai Surprise featuring singer Cat Knight. On 30 May 2011 they released a mix combination album Worldwide 001 which featured Scott Owens and Cat Knight.

=== 2012–present: Mainstream success ===
On 6 May 2012 Matrix and Futurebound released "All I Know" featuring British singer Luke Bingham. The song went on to chart in the top 30 of the UK Singles Chart at number 29 and top ten of the UK Dance Chart at number six. Later in 2012, their second single "Magnetic Eyes" was released on 30 December 2012. The song was their second top 30 hit in the UK peaking at number 24 on the UK Singles Chart and number 5 on the UK Dance Chart. In January 2014, Control, featuring Max Marshall, became their highest-charting single, peaking at number seven on the UK Singles Chart.

== Discography ==
=== As lead artist ===
==== Extended plays ====
Title	EP details
Sleepwalk	Released: 2000; Label: Virus recordings; Format: CD, digital download

==== Singles & Featured Singles ====
- "The Message / Seabreeze" [New Identity] (1996)
- "Double Vision / Sedation" [Metro Recordings] (1997)
- Dom & Matrix – "The Vandal / Footsteps" [Moving Shadow] (1997)
- Fluid Motion / Junk" [New Identity] (1997)
- Matrix Vs. Dilemma – "Spring Box Remixes" [Genetic Stress] (1998)
- Optical Vs. Matrix – "Data Life / Crossfire" [Ad Hoc] (1998)
- "Mute 98 / Convoy" [Prototype] (1998)
- Optical & Ryme Tyme / Matrix – "Ghostbuster / Gap The Mind" (1999)
- Matrix / Freshmess on Wax – "Untitled / Flip The Script Part 2 (Matrix Remix)" [Fierce] (2000)
- "Fallen (Remix) / Bad Dreams" [Idioma] (2001)
- Matrix & Danny J – "Paradiso / Can't Stop" [Metro Recordings] (2001)
- Matrix / Stakka & Skynet – "Landslide / Black Monday" (2003)
- Kemal / Matrix – "23° From Vertical" [DSCI4] (2003)
- Matrix & Danny J – "Vertigo" [Metro Recordings] (2003)
- Matrix & Danny J – "Telepathy / Domino" [BC Presents...] (2004)
- Optical, Ed Rush & Matrix – "Chamaleon" [Virus] (2006)
- Matrix & Sonic – "Flashlight / The Prophet" [Metro] (2006)
- Shimon v. Matrix – "Slip Stream" & "Dirty 5th" [AudioPorn] (2007)
- Matrix & InsideInfo – "Quattro / Ice Beam" [Metro Recordings] (2012)
- Optical / Matrix – "To Shape The Future / Raging Calm / Undersea Flight (2017 Remasters)" [Metalheadz] (2017)
- Matrix / Optical – "What's The Difference? / Medicine Remix" [Virus] (2017)
- "Let's Go Back" [Metro Recordings] (2019)
- "Hold On" [UKF] (2019)
- "Temperament 23" [Metro Recordings] (2023)

=== As Goldtrix ===
==== Singles ====
Title	Year	Peak chart positions
Title	Year	UK
"It's Love (Trippin')" (featuring Andrea Brown)	2002	6
