= Heartbeat (Wilkinson song) =

Single by Wilkinson featuring P Money and Arlissa

from the album Lazers Not Included
- Released: 26 July 2013
- Recorded: 2011–13
- Genre: Drumstep; drum and bass
- Length: 3:39
- Label: RAM; Virgin EMI
- Songwriters: Mark Wilkinson; Paris Moore-Williams; Arlissa Ruppert; Mark Taylor; Patrick Mascall
- Producer: Mark Wilkinson

Wilkinson singles chronology
"Take You Higher / Crunch" (2013)	"Heartbeat" (2013)	"Afterglow" (2013)

P Money singles chronology
"Kingpin" (2013)	"Heartbeat" (2013)	"Round the Clock" (2014)

Arlissa singles chronology
"Sticks & Stones" (2013)	"Heartbeat" (2013)	"Into the Light" (2013)

Music video
- "Heartbeat" on YouTube

"Heartbeat" is a song by the British record producer Wilkinson, featuring vocals from English grime MC P Money and English singer Arlissa. It was released on 26 July 2013, through RAM Records, as the third single from his debut album Lazers Not Included. The song has peaked at number 169 on the UK Singles Chart and number 36 on the UK Dance Chart.

== Music video ==
A music video to accompany the release of "Heartbeat" was first released onto YouTube on 24 June 2013 at a total length of three minutes and twenty-five seconds.

== Track listing ==
Digital download
No.	Title	Length
1.	"Heartbeat" (featuring P Money and Arlissa)	3:39
2.	"Heartbeat" (featuring P Money and Arlissa) (Calyx and TeeBee remix)	3:53
3.	"Heartbeat" (featuring P Money and Arlissa) (Mind Vortex remix)	4:54
4.	"Heartbeat" (featuring P Money and Arlissa) (Torqux remix)	4:24
5.	"Heartbeat" (featuring P Money and Arlissa) (instrumental)	3:39

== Chart performance ==
=== Weekly charts ===
Chart (2013)	Peak position
UK Dance (Official Charts)	36
UK Singles (Official Charts Company)	169

== Release history ==
Region	Date	Format	Label
United Kingdom	26 July 2013	Digital download	RAM; Virgin EMI
