= DJ S.K.T =

English record producer, DJ, and label manager

- Born: Stephen Kenny Tempest
- Genres: House; tech house; deep house; UK garage
- Occupations: DJ; producer
- Years active: 2004–present
- Labels: 3Beat; Ministry of Sound; Defected; Parlophone; Virgin EMI; Sony; Universal; Island; Warner Bros.; Columbia; Deconstruction; Strictly Rhythm; FFRR; Kontor; Onelove; New State; Audio Rehab; Up-Tempo
- Website: soundcloud.com/djskt

DJ S.K.T (real name Stephen Kenny Tempest) is an English record producer, DJ and label manager, known for his work involving house, and tech house.

DJ S.K.T is known for the song "Take Me Away" which peaked at number 19 on the UK Singles Chart.

== Career ==
Starting his career at the age of 12, DJ S.K.T entered under-18 DJ competitions between the age of 12–17 including 'Technics DMC under 18's battle' in which he came fourth in the country. He also entered the 'Radio 1 Search for a DJ' (under 18's) in which he came sixth in the country.

In 2013, he remixed a number of well-known tracks including Miguel's "Adorn", Somore's "I Refuse" and The Nightcrawlers's "Push the Feeling On" which went on to be signed by Ministry of Sound and released in 2014 as an official single. Tipped as the "Go-to name for major labels craving that underground credibility" and "one of the (underground) scenes best producers", it surely won't be long until S.K.T crosses over (into the mainstream)". In March 2014, he produced Little Nikki's single "Right Before My Eyes" which was released by Sony/Deconstruction on 10 August 2014.

In June 2014, he remixed Oliver Heldens & Becky Hill's UK no. 1 "Gecko (Overdrive)", and has had releases on AATW/Universal and Rinse FM's Audio Rehab label. Other notable remixes he has worked on include tracks for the New York house label Strictly Rhythm, Kontor and New State. He worked with Damon C. Scott, the vocalist on the number one track by Storm Queen and MK, "Look Right Through", Rachel K Collier (Ray Foxx) and has worked on remixes for Wilkinson and Becky Hill. He has delivered guest mixes for Kiss FM UK, Capital Xtra and was the resident DJ on BBC 1Xtra Talent in February 2014. Supporters of him include Annie Mac, MK (who featured on S.K.T's mix of "Push the Feeling On" on his BBC Radio 1 Essential Mix), Amine Edge, Steve Smart, DJ Target, Andi Durrant, MistaJam, Grant Nelson and Sam Divine (Defected). In 2016, he started a weekly show on London's Kiss FM.

His 2015 single "Take Me Away", featuring Rae, peaked at number 19 on the UK Singles Chart.

2018 saw the release of DJ S.K.T's first triple CD compilation album, Pure Tech House, which featured four of his own singles and hit No.1 on the iTunes Dance chart. In 2019, "Ballers" on his own label Stashed, peaked at No.2 on Beatport's main chart and was a fixture in the global top 10. It also held the No.1 spot on the Beatport Hype Chart for six weeks.

In 2019, S.K.T appeared at various gigs, including a headline show at Ministry of Sound, to international shows at Ibiza Rocks and Eden. His Saturday night residency on Kiss Fresh radio is broadcast to an audience of over half a million listeners each week. The same year. he signed a deal with 3 Beat Records with launch single "Certi (Move Your Body)". Re-working Marshall Jefferson's "Move Your Body", it featured new vocals by Youngman. "Certi (Move Your Body)" was added to the Kiss FM daytime playlist, resulting in over 120 plays.

2020 marked the release of DJ S.K.T's biggest single in years with "Round & Round (Boomerang)" a collaboration with the vocalist Jem Cooke on 3 Beat Records. The record was added to the Kiss FM daytime playlist, and was also crowned Radio 1 'Tune of The Week'.

== Discography ==
=== Albums ===
- Pure Tech House - Mixed By DJ S.K.T (New State)

=== Singles ===
- "Revolution" (Up-Tempo Records, October 2012)
- "Signature Sounds" (Audio Rehab, July 2013)
- "Running" (Audio Rehab, July 2014)
- "Where You Went" (Love & Other, October 2016)
- "Raindrops" (Toolroom, May 2019)
- "Ballers" (Stashed, May 2019)
- "Certi (Move Your Body)" (3Beat, October 2019)

=== Remix credits ===
- Oliver Heldens and Becky Hill – "Gecko (Overdrive)" (FFRR) – UK No. 1
- Avon Stringer – "Tell You No Lie" (One Love Records) – Australia No. 7
- La La Land – "Lonely" (Kontor/New State)
- iLL Blu – "Blu Magic" (Island)
- Rachel K Collier – "Predictions" (Strictly Rhythm)
- Wilkinson featuring Talay Riley – "Dirty Love" (Virgin/EMI)
- Becky Hill – "Caution to the Wind" (Parlophone)

=== Compilation appearances ===
- Ibiza Annual 2014 – "Push Feeling" (Ministry of Sound)
- The House That Garage Built – "Right Before My Eyes" & "Push Feeling" (Ministry of Sound)
- Marbella Sessions 2014 – "Right Before My Eyes" & "Push Feeling" (Ministry of Sound)
- Clubmix Summer – "Push Feeling" (Warner Music TV)
- Garage Nation – "Right Before My Eyes" & "Push Feeling" (Warner Music TV)
- The Only Way Is Marbs – Marbella Anthems – La La Land – "Lonely" (Warner Bros. Records)
