= Lazers Not Included =

Studio album by Wilkinson
- Released: 28 October 2013
- Recorded: 2011–13
- Genre: Electronica; drum and bass
- Length: 52:41
- Label: RAM; Virgin EMI
- Producer: Wilkinson

Wilkinson chronology
Lazers Not Included (2013)	Hypnotic (2017)

Singles from Lazers Not Included
- 1. "Need to Know" Released: 3 December 2012; 2. "Take You Higher" Released: 24 March 2013; 3. "Heartbeat" Released: 26 July 2013; 4. "Afterglow" Released: 13 October 2013; 5. "Too Close" Released: 23 February 2014; 6. "Half Light" Released: 1 June 2014; 7. "Dirty Love" Released: 12 October 2014

Lazers Not Included is the debut studio album by the British drum and bass record producer Wilkinson. The album was released on 28 October 2013 through RAM Records under license to Virgin EMI. The album includes the singles "Tonight", "Need to Know", "Take You Higher", "Heartbeat", "Afterglow", "Too Close" and "Half Light". The album has peaked at number 46 on the UK Albums Chart.

An extended edition was released on 20 October 2014. It features the UK number 20 single "Dirty Love", alongside remixes of and by Wilkinson. Notably, "Direction VIP" was previously only available on Record Store Day vinyl before appearing on the album.

== Singles ==
- The first single from the album "Need to Know" features vocals from London-based singer Iman and was released on 2 December 2012, almost a year after "Tonight". A B-side to the song titled "Direction" was also released. The song received widespread airplay and managed to chart at number 195 on the UK Singles Chart, number 39 on the UK Dance Chart and in Belgium at number 55 in the Ultratip Flanders chart.
- The second single from the album "Take You Higher" was released on 24 March 2013, alongside the B-side "Crunch" and remixes from Jakwob and Foamo. The song has peaked at number 35 on the UK Dance Chart, yet unlike its previous single, the song failed to make an appearance on the UK Singles Chart. Although, the song has also charted in the UK Indie Chart and in Belgium.
- The album's third single "Heartbeat" features vocals from British rapper P Money and English singer Arlissa. It was released on 26 July 2013 alongside remixes from Calyx, Teebee, Mind Vortex, Torqux and the instrumental edit. The song received widespread recognition and helped expose Wilkinson to a larger audience, partly thanks to frequent airplay and P Money's fanbase. It was named as one of Zane Lowe's Hottest Records in the World on BBC Radio 1. The song entered the UK Singles Chart at number 169 and the UK Dance Chart at number 36.
- "Afterglow" is the album's fourth single and Wilkinson's breakthrough song. It features uncredited vocals from Becky Hill and was released on 13 October 2013, entering the UK Singles Chart at number 8. It also topped the UK Dance Chart. The vinyl release was accompanied by the B-side "Perforation", and the digital download was accompanied by remixes from Cyantific, Dyro, Cutline and DEVolution.
- "Too Close" was released on 23 February 2014 as the album's fifth single, backed by "Midnight" on the vinyl release. It features vocals by Detour City. The digital download features the VIP mix and remixes by Wookie, Catching Flies, Frankee and Askery. The song features vocals from Detour City. It peaked at number 55 on the UK Singles Chart and number 14 on the UK Dance Chart.
- "Half Light" was released as the album's sixth single on 1 June 2014. It features vocals from Tom Cane. The song peaked at number 25 on the UK Singles Chart.
- "Dirty Love" was released on October 10 as the album's seventh single, and the first from the album's extended edition. The song features vocals from British singer Talay Riley. It peaked at number 20 on the UK Singles Chart.

=== Promotional singles ===
- The single "Tonight" was released on 4 December 2011, backed by the B-side track "Pistol Whip" which doesn't feature on the album. The song received international airplay and also gained recognition thanks to UKF Drum and Bass, accumulating over 400,000 YouTube views. "Tonight" was re-released for free as the iTunes Single of the Week on the week ending 24 November 2013. It was given alternate artwork and repackaged to promote the release of the album.

== Track listing ==
All tracks produced by Mark Wilkinson.

No.	Title	Writer(s)	Length
1.	"Need to Know" (featuring Iman)	Mark Wilkinson; Michael Gray; Anthony Moriah; Jon Pearn	4:26
2.	"Heartbeat" (featuring P Money and Arlissa)	Wilkinson; Paris Moore-Williams; Arlissa Ruppert; Mark Taylor; Patrick Mascall	3:39
3.	"Afterglow"	Wilkinson; Becky Hill; Talay Riley; Bradford Ellis	3:45
4.	"Take You Higher"	Wilkinson	4:47
5.	"Heatwave" (featuring K.Flay)	Wilkinson; Kristine Flaherty	3:02
6.	"Too Close" (featuring Detour City)	Wilkinson; Tabitha Benjamin	3:37
7.	"Like It Hard"	Wilkinson	3:46
8.	"Sleepless"	Wilkinson	4:20
9.	"Let Me Be Free" (featuring Detour City)	Wilkinson; Benjamin	3:42
10.	"Tonight"	Wilkinson	4:48
11.	"Need You" (featuring Iman)	Wilkinson; Iman Osman	4:06
12.	"Redemption"	Wilkinson	4:04
13.	"Half Light" (featuring Tom Cane)	Wilkinson; Thomas Havelock; Ellis	4:39
Total length:			52:41

Extended edition bonus tracks
No.	Title	Writer(s)	Length
14.	"Dirty Love" (featuring Talay Riley)	Wilkinson; Riley	3:44
15.	"Too Close VIP"	Wilkinson	4:28
16.	"Think About It" (by Naughty Boy featuring Wiz Khalifa and Ella Eyre) (Wilkinson remix)	Shahid Khan; Andrea Martin; Cameron Jibril Thomaz; James Murray; Mustafa Omer; Luke Juby	4:40
17.	"Half Light" (TCTS remix)	Wilkinson; Havelock; Ellis	4:16
18.	"Direction VIP"	Wilkinson	5:12
19.	"Heartbeat" (Calyx and TeeBee remix)	Wilkinson; Moore-Williams; Ruppert; Taylor; Mascall	3:53

Double-vinyl
No.	Title	Length
1.	"Like It Hard"	3:46
2.	"Casino"	4:27
3.	"Redemption"	4:04
4.	"Sleepless"	4:20

Notes

- "Afterglow" features uncredited vocals by Becky Hill.
- "Need to Know" contains interpolations of "Watcha Doing Now?" (Full Intention mix) by Anthony Moriah.

== Charts ==
Chart (2013)	Peak position
UK Albums (OCC)	46
UK Dance Albums (OCC)	2

== Certifications ==
Certifications and sales for Lazers Not Included
Region	Certification	Certified units/sales
New Zealand (RMNZ)	Platinum	15,000^{‡}
United Kingdom (BPI)	Silver	60,000^{‡}
^{‡} Sales+streaming figures based on certification alone.
