= Catching Flies =

English musician, DJ and record producer (born 1991)

- Born: 1991 (age 34–35)
- Origin: London, England
- Genres: Electronic, trip hop, downtempo
- Years active: 2012–present
- Labels: Indigo Soul; Anjunadeep
- Website: catchingflies.com

Catching Flies is the stage name of George King (born 1991), an English electronic musician, record producer and DJ. He has released music through Ninja Tune, Anjunadeep, Cercle and his own label, Indigo Soul.

== Style ==
Catching Flies' music incorporates elements of trip hop, downtempo, house, soul and jazz. His sound has been compared to that of Flying Lotus and Bonobo.

== Career ==
Catching Flies began releasing music in 2012 with his debut EP The Stars, followed by The Long Journey Home (2013). In 2014, he supported Bonobo on his European tour. During this period, King recorded guest mixes for Mixmag, Solid Steel and i-D.

King's debut studio album, Silver Linings, was released in July 2019. It was followed by Silver Linings Remixed (2020), featuring contributions from DJ Seinfeld, Andhim, Grandbrothers and others.

In 2021, he received a BAFTA nomination for his soundtrack work on the video game Sackboy: A Big Adventure. The following year, he recorded a live performance with a string quartet at the Musée d'Orsay in Paris in collaboration with Cercle, accompanied by the release of "Orsay".

Catching Flies' second studio album, Tides, was released in 2024. Other releases during this period included "GLY", which was remixed by Hot Chip and DJ Boring, and [Strings], an EP featuring string quartet arrangements of his earlier compositions, released through Anjunadeep. In November 2024, Catching Flies recorded a two-hour Essential Mix for BBC Radio 1.

In 2025, he released Beats & Pieces, a hip-hop-influenced instrumental project recorded with the West Green Quartet. The track 'Proud' was used in a Midjourney advertising campaign. He has also collaborated with or remixed artists including Totally Enormous Extinct Dinosaurs, Sofia Kourtesis, and Actress.

== Discography ==
=== Albums ===
- Silver Linings (Indigo Soul, 2019)
- Silver Linings Remixed (Indigo Soul, 2020)
- Tides (Indigo Soul, 2024)
- Tides (Reworks) (Indigo Soul, 2024)
- Beats & Pieces (with the West Green Quartet) (Indigo Soul, 2025)
- Beats & Pieces II (Indigo Soul, 2026)

=== EPs ===
- The Stars (Indigo Soul, 2012)
- The Long Journey Home (Indigo Soul, 2013)
- Komorebi/Mama's Wisdom (Indigo Soul, 2016)
- New Gods (Indigo Soul, 2018)
- Satisfied (Indigo Soul, 2018)
- Orsay (Indigo Soul, 2022)
- [Strings] (Anjunadeep, 2024)
- On a Clear Day, You Can See Forever (Indigo Soul, 2025)
- Hummingbird (Indigo Soul, 2025)
- 1991 (Indigo Soul, 2025)

=== Collaborations ===
- Catching Flies & Ifan Dafydd – "Don't Know How" (Push & Run, 2013)
- Submotion Orchestra feat. Catching Flies – "Ao" (Counter Records/Ninja Tune, 2016)
- Catching Flies feat. Jay Prince & Oscar Jerome – "New Gods" (Indigo Soul, 2018)

=== Remixes ===
- Mt. Wolf – "Life Size Ghosts" (Indigo Soul, 2012)
- Jill Scott – "Golden" (White Label, 2012)
- Louis M^ttrs – "War with Heaven" (Virgin EMI Records, 2013)
- Rainy Milo – "Rats" (Virgin EMI Records, 2013)
- Wilkinson – "Too Close" (RAM Records, 2013)
- Kwabs – "Perfect Ruin" (Warner Music, 2015)
- Instupendo – "Save" (Instupendo, 2017)
- Klangstof – "Hostage" (Mind of a Genius / Warner Brothers, 2017)
- Yoste – "Chihiro" (2018)
- Georgia, David Jackson – "Get Me Higher" (Universal Music Operations, 2021)
- Tor – "Eleuthera" (2022)
- Billy Fury – "Wondrous Place" (Universal Music Operations, 2023)
- East Forest – "Cosmic Dance" (featuring Marieme) (Bright Antenna Records, 2024)
- Pretty Girl – "My Trust, My Love" (One House, 2024)
