= Back to You =

Back to You may refer to:

== Television ==
- Back to You (TV series), a short-lived American situation comedy series September 2007 to May 2008

== Music ==
Albums:

- Back to You (album), a 1997 album by Anita Cochran

Songs:

- "Back to You" (Rock Goddess song), 1983
- "Back to You" (Riverdales song), 1995
- "Back to You" (Bryan Adams song), 1997
- "Back to You", by Gotthard from Open, 1998
- "Back to You" (John Mayer song), 2001
- "Back to You" (Brett Anderson song), 2007
- "Back to You" (Thenewno2 song), 2008
- "Back to You", by Lil Wayne from I Am Not a Human Being II, 2013
- "Back to You" (Mandisa song), 2014
- "Back to You" (Mary Mary song), 2016
- "Back to You", by Mitch Zorn, 2025
- "Back to You" (Mollie King song), 2016
- "Back to You" (Louis Tomlinson song), 2017
- "Back to You", by All That Remains from Madness, 2017
- "Back to You" (Selena Gomez song), 2018
- "Back to You" (Shane Filan song), 2018
- "Back to You" (Lost Frequencies, Elley Duhé, and X Ambassadors song), 2022
- "Back 2 You / Still Grey", a 2004 song by Pendulum
- "Back 2 U", a 2016 song by Steve Aoki and Boehm
