= FabricLive.76 =

Compilation album by Calyx & TeeBee
- Released: 21 July 2014
- Recorded: 2014
- Genre: Drum and Bass
- Length: 1:07:34
- Label: Fabric
- Producer: Various

FabricLive chronology
FabricLive.75 (2014)	FabricLive.76 (2014)	FabricLive.77 (2014)

Calyx chronology
Anatomy (2007)	FabricLive.76 (2014)

TeeBee chronology
All or Nothing (2012)	FabricLive.76 (2014)

Professional ratings
Review scores
Source	Rating
Resident Advisor	4/5 stars

FabricLive.76 is a DJ mix album by English drum and bass musician Calyx and Norwegian DJ musician TeeBee. The album was released as part of the FabricLive Mix Series.

== Track listing ==
No.	Title	Length
1.	"Friction & Skream ft. Scrufizzer, P Money & Riko Dan - Kingpin (Calyx & TeeBee Remix)"	3:32
2.	"Gridlok & Prolix - Revenge"	1:06
3.	"Calyx & TeeBee - Skank"	2:13
4.	"Xtrah - Compulsive"	2:13
5.	"Ulterior Motive - 2098"	1:29
6.	"Calibre - Instant"	1:51
7.	"TeeBee - Human Reptile (Calyx & Teebee Remix)"	1:51
8.	"Break - Duck For Cover"	1:51
9.	"NC17 & KC - SlimeVille"	1:29
10.	"Nasty Habits - Shadow Boxing (Om Unit Remix)"	1:51
11.	"Calyx & TeeBee ft. Kemo - Pure Gold"	3:32
12.	"Gridlok & Prolix - Riot VIP"	1:29
13.	"The Prototypes - Pale Blue Dot"	1:51
14.	"Teddy Killerz - Demolisher"	1:51
15.	"Chris.Su - Solaris VIP"	2:14
16.	"Break - Kill Dem (instrumental version)"	1:51
17.	"Syron - Here (Calyx & TeeBee Remix)"	2:13
18.	"Michael Woods ft. Ester Dean - We've Only Just Begun (Calyx & TeeBee Remix)"	1:51
19.	"Break - Tempted"	2:13
20.	"Noisia ft. Calyx & TeeBee - Hyenas"	1:51
21.	"Teddy Killerz - New Drums VIP"	2:58
22.	"Hidden Turn ft. Azaco - Time"	2:36
23.	"Blu Mar Ten ft. Agne Genyte - Break It All Apart (Break Remix)"	1:29
24.	"Break & DLR - New Design"	1:51
25.	"Calyx & TeeBee - Strung Out VIP"	1:29
26.	"Arp XP - Five Black Forms (Hybris Remix)"	1:29
27.	"Teddy Killerz ft. Brain Crisis - Local 2"	1:51
28.	"Brain Crisis - Hands Up"	1:29
29.	"Bricky Mortar - Salford John (Dub Phizix Remix)"	2:02
30.	"Optical - The Shining (Ed Rush & Optical Remix)"	2:02
31.	"Teddy Killerz - Off World"	1:51
32.	"Fierce & Optiv - Surface Noise"	1:51
33.	"Kemal & Rob Data - Star Trails"	1:51
34.	"Calyx & TeeBee - Elevate This Sound"	2:23
