= Take Me Away =

Take Me Away may refer to:

== Songs ==
- "Take Me Away" (Avril Lavigne song), 2004
- "Take Me Away" (Babble song), 1994
- "Take Me Away" (Cappella song), 1992
- "Take Me Away" (Culture Beat song), 1995
- "Take Me Away" (D:Ream song), 1994
- "Take Me Away" (DJ S.K.T song), 2015
- "Take Me Away" (Fefe Dobson song)
- "Take Me Away" (Keyshia Cole song), 2011
- "Take Me Away" (Lash song), 2001
- "Take Me Away" (Lifehouse song), 2003
- "Take Me Away" (StoneBridge song), 2005
- "Take Me Away" (Tiff Lacey song), 2011
- "Take Me Away" (Tungevaag & Raaban and Victor Crone song), 2019
- "Take Me Away" (Twenty 4 Seven song), 1994
- "Take Me Away", by 7 Days Away from Punisher: War Zone Original Motion Picture Soundtrack
- "Take Me Away", by Bleachers featuring Grimes from Strange Desire
- "Take Me Away", by Blue Öyster Cult from The Revölution by Night
- "Take Me Away", by Chase & Status
- "Take Me Away", by Christina Vidal from the film soundtrack Freaky Friday
- "Take Me Away", by Clooney, the theme to Little Women: LA
- "Take Me Away", by Collar, 2023
- "Take Me Away", by Daniel Caesar from Freudian
- "Take Me Away", by Danny Fernandes from AutomaticLUV
- "Take Me Away", by Delirious? from Audio Lessonover?
- "Take Me Away", by FireHouse from Prime Time
- "Take Me Away", by Haji & Emanuel
- "Take Me Away", by Janet Jackson from Unbreakable
- "Take Me Away", by Jonas Aden & Brooks
- "Take Me Away", by Kalmah from Palo
- "Take Me Away", by Killswitch Engage from Killswitch Engage (2009 album)
- "Take Me Away", by Kotipelto from Coldness
- "Take Me Away", by Mondo Generator from Dead Planet
- "Take Me Away", by Nine Lies from 9 Lies
- "Take Me Away", by Oasis, a B-side of the single "Supersonic"
- "Take Me Away", by Plain White T's from All That We Needed
- "Take Me Away", by The Plot in You from Happiness in Self Destruction
- "Take Me Away", by Prism from See Forever Eyes
- "Take Me Away", by Scatman John from Take Your Time
- "Take Me Away", by Seether from Disclaimer II
- "Take Me Away", by Snoop Dogg from I Wanna Thank Me
- "Take Me Away", by Status Quo from Never Too Late
- "Take Me Away", by Ted Nugent from Little Miss Dangerous
- "Take Me Away", by Ween from Chocolate and Cheese
- "Take Me Away (Into the Night)", by 4 Strings

== Films ==
- Take Me Away! (1978 film) or Furimukeba Ai, a Japanese film
- Take Me Away (film), a 1994 Italian romance-drama film
