= LuvBug =

English electronic dance music trio

- Origin: England, United Kingdom
- Genres: Dance
- Occupation: Band
- Years active: 2012–2016
- Labels: Polydor Records
- Members: Marvin Humes; White N3rd; JKAY

LuvBug is an English electronic dance music trio consisting of London-born DJ & producer Marvin Humes, Manchester-based producer White N3rd and producer/songwriter JKAY.

== Career ==
Humes and JKAY grew up in Woolwich, East London with JKAY becoming part of the songwriting/producing duo Tracklacers. They worked with producers including Danja (Justin Timberlake, Usher) and Afrojack (David Guetta, Major Lazer) and also produced early material for JLS, the pop/R&B boy band Humes was formerly a part of. N3rd has produced remixes for Diplo and Azealia Banks and was introduced to Humes through songwriter Ali Tennant (Guetta). In April 2013, the trio came together at a London-based studio and started working on material. The group released a string of remixes for the likes of Leah McFall & will.i.am, Inner City, Case & Foxy Brown.

=== 2014–present: Single releases ===
After signing to Polydor Records and working with producer Pantha, Humes suggested British R&B singer Talay Riley for vocals and thus created their debut single "Resonance", which was released on 5 October 2014 and debuted at number 13 on the UK Singles Chart and number 10 on the Scottish charts. An album was announced to be in the works.

Its second single, "Revive (Say Something)", featuring uncredited vocals from Mark Asari, was released on 15 February 2015, and peaked at number 17 on the UK Singles Chart.

The third single, "Best Is Yet to Come", featuring uncredited vocals from Scouting for Girls, was released on 15 April 2016. The audio video was released in February 2016 on YouTube and Vevo. Claudia Gadelha used Best is Yet to Come as her walkout song at UFC 212.

== Discography ==
=== Singles ===
Title	Year	Peak chart positions			Album
Title	Year	UK	IRE	SCO	Album
"Resonance" (featuring Talay Riley)	2014	13	—	10	Non-album singles
"Revive (Say Something)"	2014	17	—	13	Non-album singles
"Best Is Yet to Come"	2016	68	—	—	Non-album singles

=== Remixes ===
Year	Title	Artist(s)
2013	"Billion Lights" (LuvBug Remix)	JLS
2013	"Disco Love" (LuvBug Club Mix)	The Saturdays
2013	"Hand on Heart" (LuvBug Remix)	Olly Murs
2014	"What Are You Waiting For?" (LuvBug Radio Edit)	The Saturdays
2014	"Crazy Stupid Love" (LuvBug Remix)	Cheryl featuring Tinie Tempah
2014	"Bandolero" (LuvBug Remix)	Diztortion
2015	"Say Something" (LuvBug Remix)	Karen Harding
2015	"Black Magic" (LuvBug Remix)	Little Mix
2015	"House Every Weekend" (LuvBug Remix)	David Zowie
2015	"New Love" (LuvBug Remix)	Arches ft. Karen Harding
2015	"Sax" (LuvBug Remix)	Fleur East
2015	"Never Forget You" (LuvBug Remix)	MNEK & Zara Larsson
2016	"Get Stupid" (LuvBug Remix)	Aston Merrygold
2016	"Back To You" (LuvBug Remix)	Mollie King
2016	"Say It Again" (LuvBug Remix)	Frances
