= Need to Know =

Need to know is a category of classified information.

Need to know or Need to Know may also refer to:

== Television ==
- "Need to Know" (House), 2006 episode
- "Need to Know" (NCIS), 2012 episode of the American police procedural drama
- "Need to Know" (The Professionals), 1980 episode
- "Need to Know" (The Twilight Zone), episode of the 1985 series revival
- Need to Know (TV program), PBS TV and web newsmagazine

== Music ==
- "Need to Know" (Doja Cat song), 2021
- "Need to Know" (Wilkinson song), 2012
- Need to Know (EP), 2026 EP by XO
- "Need to Know", 2018 song by the Story So Far from Proper Dose
- "Need to Know", a 2016 song by Macklemore & Ryan Lewis from This Unruly Mess I've Made

== Other uses ==
- Need to Know (newsletter), also known as NTK, technology newsletter published from 1997 to 2007

== See also ==
- I Need to Know (disambiguation)
