= Dirty Love =

Dirty Love may refer to:

== Films ==
- Dirty Love (film), a 2005 film
- Dirty Love, a 1988 Italian film; see Jeff Stryker

== Music ==
- "Dirty Love" (song), a 2014 song by Wilkinson
- "Dirty Love", a song by Cher Lloyd from the 2014 album Sorry I'm Late
- "Dirty Love", a song by Frank Zappa from the 1973 album Over-Nite Sensation
- "Dirty Love", a song by Kesha, featuring Iggy Pop, from the 2012 album Warrior
- "Dirty Love", a song by Motörhead on the B-side of the "Ace of Spades" single
- "Dirty Love", a song by Thunder from the album Backstreet Symphony, 1990

== See also ==
- Sexual intercourse
