= Too Close =

Too Close may refer to:

- Too Close (TV series), a 2021 British three-part drama series
- "Too Close" (Alex Clare song), 2011
- "Too Close" (Next song), 1997; covered by Blue, 2001
- "Too Close" (Wilkinson song), 2014
- "Too Close", a song by Ariana Grande from My Everything, 2014
- "Too Close", a song by Blackbear from Anonymous, 2019
- "Too Close", a song by Dan Talevski and Ria Mae, 2019
- "Too Close", a song by Louis the Child and Wrabel, 2019
- "Too Close", a song by Enhypen from Desire: Unleash, 2025
