= Half Light (Wilkinson song) =

Single by Wilkinson featuring Tom Cane

from the album Lazers Not Included
- B-side: "Audio remix"
- Released: 1 June 2014
- Recorded: 2013
- Genre: Drum and bass
- Length: 4:39 (album version / extended mix); 3:03 (single version / original)
- Label: RAM; Virgin EMI
- Songwriters: Mark Wilkinson; Thomas Havelock; Bradford Ellis
- Producers: Wilkinson; Brad Ellis (add.)

Wilkinson singles chronology
"Too Close" (2014)	"Half Light" (2014)	"Dirty Love" (2014)

Tom Cane singles chronology
"Starting Again" (2013)	"Half Light" (2014)	"Sun in Your Eyes" (2014)

Music video
- "Half Light" on YouTube

"Half Light" is a song by the British drum and bass producer Wilkinson. It features vocals from British singer Tom Cane. It was released on 1 June 2014 through RAM Records as the sixth single from his debut studio album Lazers Not Included. The song has charted at number 25 on the UK Singles Chart, making "Half Light" Wilkinson's second top 40 single after "Afterglow".

== Music video ==
The music video to accompany the release of "Half Light" was first released onto YouTube on 1 May 2014. It was directed by Aoife McArdle.

== Track listing ==
Digital download
No.	Title	Length
1.	"Half Light" (featuring Tom Cane)	3:03

Digital download – remixes
No.	Title	Length
1.	"Half Light" (TCTS remix)	4:15
2.	"Half Light" (Audio remix)	5:20
3.	"Half Light" (Stadiumx remix)	6:00
4.	"Half Light" (extended mix)	4:39

12" vinyl
No.	Title	Length
1.	"Half Light"	3:11
2.	"Half Light" (Audio remix)	5:22

== Credits and personnel ==
- Vocals, writer – Thomas Havelock
- Producer, programming – Mark Wilkinson
- Additional producer, synth keys – Bradford Ellis
- Label – RAM Records, Virgin EMI Records

== Chart performance ==
=== Weekly charts ===
Chart (2014)	Peak position
Scotland Singles (Official Charts)	28
UK Dance (Official Charts)	9
UK Singles (Official Charts)	25

== Certifications ==
Certifications for "Half Light"
Region	Certification	Certified units/sales
New Zealand (RMNZ)	Gold	15,000^{‡}
^{‡} Sales+streaming figures based on certification alone.

== Release history ==
Region	Date	Format	Label
Worldwide	1 June 2014	Digital download	Virgin EMI
Worldwide	2 June 2014	12" vinyl	RAM
