= All or Nothing (Calyx and Teebee album) =

Studio album by Calyx and Teebee
- Released: 5 November 2012
- Genre: Drum and bass
- Length: 58:11
- Label: RAM Records

Calyx and Teebee chronology
Anatomy (2007)	All or Nothing (2012)	1x1 (2016)

Singles from All or Nothing
- 1. "Scavenger" Released: 10 June 2012; 2. "Elevate This Sound" Released: 12 August 2012; 3. "Pure Gold" Released: 29 October 2012; 4. "Strung Out" Released: 24 November 2013

All or Nothing is the second collaborative album by drum and bass artists Calyx and Teebee. The album was released on November 5, 2012.

== Track listing ==
No.	Title	Length
1.	"Heroes & Villains"	5:37
2.	"Pure Gold" (featuring Kemo)	5:34
3.	"Skank"	4:38
4.	"We Become One" (featuring Foreign Beggars and Craze)	5:03
5.	"Elevate This Sound"	5:20
6.	"We Fall Away"	4:30
7.	"Scavenger"	5:07
8.	"Strung Out"	3:29
9.	"You'll Never Take Me Alive" (featuring Beardyman)	4:16
10.	"Starstruck"	5:00
11.	"Back & Forth"	4:41
12.	"Nothing I Can Say"	5:26
