= Detour City =

British singer and songwriter

Tabitha Benjamin, known by her stage name Detour City, is a British, London-based singer and songwriter.

Benjamin began her career as a folk musician, but has eventually become more involved in the world of electronica. Her vocals have been used in songs by various artists, including Breakage, Dimension, and in a remix for Bastille's "Overjoyed". She has also toured with Ed Sheeran.

She is best known for her collaboration with British electronic music producer Wilkinson, who has featured her in the single "Too Close" from his album Lazers Not Included. In the album, they have also collaborated in the song "Let Me Be Free".

Her debut single "Merlin (Everybody Knows)" was premiered on 1 July 2014 through UKF Music's Drum and Bass channel. Wonderland Magazine premiered the music video for the track four weeks later. The video, directed by Jamie Delaney, was published to YouTube through Detour City's Vevo channel on 28 July 2014. The single was released on 21 September through Polydor Records.

Benjamin is working on a new musical project Tabs, writing the score for the short documentary film Invisible Women. The project's debut album, Love Like This, was released on 27 September 2019 under her own record label Butch, Please! Records.
