= Resonance (LuvBug song) =

Single by LuvBug featuring Talay Riley
- Released: 3 October 2014
- Recorded: 2014
- Genre: Deep house
- Length: 3:26
- Label: Polydor
- Songwriter(s): Aaron Cowan; Marvin Humes; Talay Riley
- Producer(s): Pantha; Marvin Humes; Scribz Riley

LuvBug singles chronology
"Resonance" (2014)	"Revive (Say Something)" (2015)

Talay Riley singles chronology
"Make You Mine" (2012)	"Resonance" (2014)	"Dirty Love" (2014)

"Resonance" is the debut single from British dance group LuvBug, featuring vocals from British singer Talay Riley. The song was produced by Pantha, Talay's brother Scribz Riley and LuvBug member Marvin Humes. It was originally intended for a 28 September 2014 release but was ultimately postponed by a week and released as a digital download on 5 October 2014 in the United Kingdom. The song peaked at number 13 on the UK Singles Chart. It was intended for inclusion on a debut LuvBug album which was not released.

== Reception ==
Peter Robinson of Popjustice described the song in an interview with Marvin Humes as "fine" and "bang on trend", noting that the song had been disproportionately supported by Humes' colleagues on Capital FM and other Global radio stations compared to other stations such as BBC Radio 1.

== Track listing ==
Digital download – single
No.	Title	Length
1.	"Resonance" (featuring Talay Riley)	3:26

Digital download – EP
No.	Title	Length
1.	"Resonance" (MNEK Remix)	4:16
2.	"Resonance" (Friend Within Remix)	5:51
3.	"Resonance" (The White N3rd Remix)	3:56
4.	"Resonance" (Dexcell Remix)	5:30

== Charts ==
Chart (2014)	Peak position
Scotland (OCC)	10
UK Singles (OCC)	13
UK Dance (OCC)	4

== Release history ==
Region	Date	Format	Label
Ireland	3 October 2014	Digital download	Polydor
United Kingdom	5 October 2014	Digital download	Polydor
