= Say Something (Karen Harding song) =

Single by Karen Harding

from the album Take Me Somewhere
- B-side: "Those Girls"
- Released: 1 February 2015
- Recorded: 2014
- Genre: Deep house
- Length: 3:39
- Label: Method Records
- Songwriters: Karen Harding; Uzoechi Emenike
- Producer: MNEK

Karen Harding singles chronology
"Say Something" (2015)	"New Love" (2015)

"Say Something" is the debut single by English singer Karen Harding. The song was released in the United Kingdom as a digital download on 1 February 2015 through Method Records. The song was written by Karen Harding and Uzoechi Emenike who also produced the song. The song peaked at number 7 on the UK Singles Chart.

== Music video ==
A music video to accompany the release of "Say Something" was first released onto YouTube on 30 September 2014 at a total length of three minutes and thirty-eight seconds.

== Track listing ==
Digital download
No.	Title	Length
1.	"Say Something"	3:38

Digital download - EP
No.	Title	Length
1.	"Say Something" (Zac Samuel Remix)	3:33
2.	"Say Something" (Bodhi Remix)	3:38
3.	"Say Something" (Wookie Remix)	5:00
4.	"Those Girls"	5:00

Digital download – Remixes
No.	Title	Length
1.	"Say Something" (LuvBug Remix)	5:27
2.	"Say Something" (S.P.Y Remix)	5:45
3.	"Say Something" (Clutch Remix)	6:01

12" vinyl
No.	Title	Length
1.	"Say Something"	3:38
2.	"Say Something" (Zac Samuel Remix)	3:33

== Charts ==
=== Weekly charts ===
Chart (2015)	Peak position
Ireland (IRMA)	73
Scotland Singles (OCC)	11
UK Singles (OCC)	7
UK Dance (OCC)	2

=== Year-end charts ===
Chart (2015)	Position
UK Singles (OCC)	69

== Certifications ==
Region	Certification	Certified units/sales
United Kingdom (BPI)	2× Platinum	1,200,000^{‡}
^{‡} Sales+streaming figures based on certification alone.

== Release history ==
Region	Date	Format	Label	Ref.
United Kingdom	1 February 2015	Digital download	Method Records	
