= Hopelessly Coping =

Single by Wilkinson featuring Thabo
- B-side: "René LaVice's Hopelessly Doomed remix"
- Released: 17 May 2015
- Recorded: December 2013–2015
- Genre: Drum and bass
- Length: 3:43
- Label: RAM; Virgin EMI
- Songwriters: Mark Wilkinson; Thabo Mkwananzi; Bradford Ellis; Seton Daunt
- Producer: Wilkinson

Wilkinson singles chronology
"Hit the Floor" (2015)	"Hopelessly Coping" (2015)	"Flatline" (2016)

Thabo singles chronology
"Not Your Man" (2014)	"Hopelessly Coping" (2014)

Music video
- "Hopelessly Coping" on YouTube

"Hopelessly Coping" is a song by the British drum and bass producer Wilkinson. It features vocals from Huddersfield singer Thabo. It was released on 17 May 2015 through RAM Records and Virgin EMI. The song entered the UK Singles Chart at number 49.

== Background and release ==
Speaking about the song's history, Wilkinson said the following:

"I wrote three different versions of the song,” he says. “I took everything out rebuilt it. Like fitting a house, I guess. Stripped it all out, started again and wrote a whole new tune. Three times. It started to make me realise the elements I actually liked. When you’re too deep into a track you don’t realise which components are really working. So stripping it back and adding them back in gradually made me realise the key points that I like. I played with the structure and went in deeper for the more chilled, liquid roller vibe that it is today."

The song was originally slated for release on 3 May 2015, but got later pushed back to 15 May.

== Music video ==
A music video was first released onto YouTube on 22 March 2015. The video has since accumulated over one million views.

== Track listing ==
Digital download – single
No.	Title	Length
1.	"Hopelessly Coping" (featuring Thabo)	3:43

Digital download – EP
No.	Title	Length
1.	"Hopelessly Coping" (Gorgon City remix)	4:47
2.	"Hopelessly Coping" (René LaVice's Hopelessly Doomed remix)	4:12
3.	"Hopelessly Coping" (Preditah remix)	4:21
4.	"Hopelessly Coping" (Hanami remix)	4:43
Total length:		18:04

12" vinyl
No.	Title	Length
1.	"Hopelessly Coping"	3:43
2.	"Hopelessly Coping" (René LaVice's Hopelessly Doomed remix)	4:43

== Chart performance ==
=== Weekly charts ===
Chart (2015)	Peak position
Scotland Singles (Official Charts)	60
UK Dance (Official Charts)	11
UK Singles (Official Charts)	49
