= Friction (music producer) =

DJ and drum and bass producer

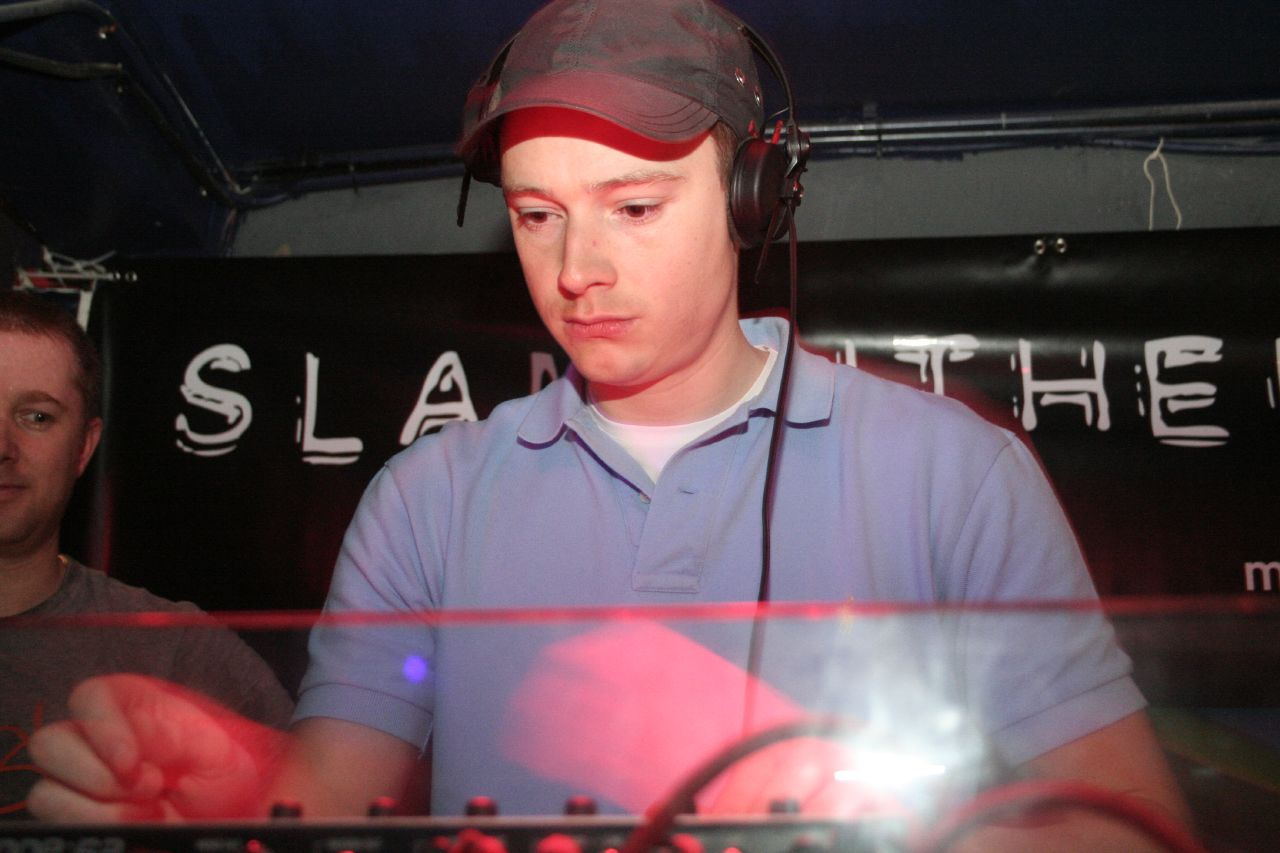
- Friction in 2007

Background information
- Also known as: DJ Friction; FineArt
- Born: Edward William Keeley; 20 May 1977 (age 49)
- Origin: Brighton, England
- Genres: Drum and bass
- Occupations: Disc jockey, record producer
- Years active: 1998–present
- Labels: Shogun Audio; Valve Recordings; True Playaz; Renegade Hardware; Elevate Records; Maraki Records
- Website: Friction; Shogun Audio

Edward Keeley (born 20 May 1977), better known by his stage name Friction or FineArt, is a British drum and bass record producer and DJ from Brighton, South East England. He runs his own record labels, Shogun Audio & Elevate Records, and has formerly presented a regular overnight show on BBC Radio 1.

== Biography ==
Brighton-raised Friction is one of many drum and bass DJs to utilise three-to-four decks to mash up his mixes. As a teenager Friction was busy playing and promoting events in Brighton when he began collaborating with local producers Stakka & K-Tee who were heavily involved in Andy C's Ram Records label.

In 1998 Friction released his debut single "Critical Mass" under the stage name Kinnetix, attracting the attention of major labels. Soon he was releasing tracks on renowned labels such as Valve, Tru Playaz, Trouble On Vinyl, 31 Records, Hospital, Charge and Renegade Hardware alongside his own Shogun Audio imprint.

Throughout his career, Friction has received critical praise as "one of the biggest DJs in the drum and bass scene, with an extremely fast rise to success." His CDs released on the Hospital, Tru Playaz and Renegade Hardware labels have been commercially successful, especially the 2007 track, "Back To Your Roots Remix" on Shogun Audio.

Friction is the founder of Shogun Audio, and was a regular DJ on the BBC 1Xtra D&B M1X Show. He is not to be confused with London-based Skam Artist DJ/producer Fricktion, who specialises in open format genres, or Bobby Friction of the BBC Asian Network.

Friction has collaborated several times with British singer-songwriter and rapper Example. Since Friction's 2011 remix of his #1 hit single "Changed the Way You Kiss Me", Example has co-written songs for Friction ("Led Astray" and "Long Gone Memory") and Friction has co-produced an album track for Example ("Snakeskin"). Friction also collaborated with English electronic musician Skream in the 2013 song "Kingpin" (featuring UK grime MCs Scrufizzer, P Money and Riko Dan from Roll Deep).

On 10 January 2012, BBC Radio 1's Zane Lowe made Friction's song "Led Astray" his Hottest Record in the World.

On Monday, 2 April 2012, Friction started presenting his own drum and bass show on BBC Radio 1 on Mondays from 2 am to 4 am. The show moved to Sundays from 3 am to 5 am and was also simulcast on BBC Radio 1Xtra.

In October 2017, after 6 years of building the show into a global broadcast staple of the drum & bass genre (and a previous return to Mondays from 1 am to 3 am), the show made one final move to Tuesdays from 1 am to 3 am. Shortly thereafter, Friction announced he would 'pass the baton' to Canadian DJ/producer, Rene LaVice, who would take over as host of a new drum and bass show on 1Xtra in November 2017.

In 2015, Friction created an alter-ego alias under the name FineArt which would step away from drum & bass and would concentrate more on bassline and house. His first release was a song titled "Ruffneck" which was released on Sony Music Entertainment. A few months later would be the release of another single, this was a collaboration on My Nu Leng's "Horizons EP" with a single titled "Set It". Later in 2015 another single called "I Don't Wanna Rush" which featured vocals from Rachel K Collier was released with a bunch of remixes. In 2017, FineArt & My Nu Leng announced the launch of their label called Maraki Records, the first release was from FineArt with an EP titled "In Too Deep" which featured collaborations with fellow record label owners My Nu Leng, and Taiki Nulight.

In March 2016, he launched the label "Elevate Records". Its first release was Friction's Dare EP with the title track, Dare (Hold It Down) containing an interpolation of Gorillaz' 2005 song Dare. Elevate Records later expanded to release music from a variety of dance-floor drum & bass artists, including Turno, Kanine and Macky Gee.

== Accolades ==
Friction has won numerous accolades such as:

- Best Newcomer at the 2002 Drum&BassArena Awards
- Best Breakthrough DJ at the 2003 Knowledge Awards
- Best Newcomer at the Accelerated Culture Awards
- Best DJ at the 2007 MTV Romania Awards
- Runner-up Best DJ at the 2009 Drum & Bass Awards
- Runner-up Best DJ at the 2011 Drum & Bass Awards
- Hall of Fame at the 2011 Drum&BassArena Awards
- Best Radio Show for his BBC Radio 1 show at the 2013 Drum & Bass Awards
- Runner-up Best DJ at the 2013 Drum & Bass Awards
- Best Radio Show for his BBC Radio 1 show at the 2014 Drum & Bass Awards
