= Wilkinson (musician) =

English record producer, DJ, and remixer

- Wilkinson in 2024

Background information
- Born: Mark Wilkinson; 18 April 1989 (age 37); London Borough of Hammersmith, England
- Origin: Hammersmith, London, England
- Genres: Drum and bass; dubstep; future jungle
- Occupations: Record producer; DJ; remixer
- Years active: 2010–present
- Labels: RAM; Hospital; Virgin EMI; Sleepless
- Website: wilkinson-music.com

Mark Wilkinson (born 18 April 1989), better known by his surname Wilkinson, is an English record producer, DJ and remixer from Hammersmith, England. He has released music on RAM Records and Hospital Records, as well as Virgin EMI. His 2013 single "Afterglow" with vocals by Becky Hill reached number eight on the UK Singles Chart on 20 October 2013.

== Music career ==
=== 2010–2016: RAM Records and Lazers Not Included ===
On 13 December 2010, Wilkinson released his debut single "Moonwalker / Samurai" through RAM Records. The tracks were first premiered through Andy C's drum and bass compilation album Nightlife 5. On 12 June 2011, he released the single "Every Time / Overdose", which became the 99th single release of RAM Records. "Every Time" features vocals from Marcus Gregg and it became Wilkinson's first song to spawn a music video. On 4 December 2011, he released "Tonight / Pistol Whip". "Tonight" was later re-released in 2013 as the iTunes Single of the Week to promote the release of his debut studio album Lazers Not Included. On 19 August 2012, he released the single "Automatic / Hands Up!". Although it received mixed feedback and significantly less airplay, "Automatic" still managed to gain support from the likes of Annie Mac and MistaJam.

On 2 December 2012, he released "Need to Know / Direction" featuring Iman as the lead single from his debut studio album. On 3 April 2013, he released "Take You Higher / Crunch" as the next single from the album. On 26 July 2013, he released "Heartbeat" featuring P Money and Arlissa as the third single from his debut studio album. On 13 October 2013, he released "Afterglow" as the fourth single from his debut studio album. The song peaked at number eight on the UK Singles Chart, making it his first top 10 single in the UK. On 28 October 2013, he released his debut studio album Lazers Not Included. The album peaked at number 46 on the UK Albums Chart and number two on the UK Dance Chart. On 9 February 2014, he released "Too Close" featuring Detour City as the album's fifth single, which peaked at number 55 in the UK. The album's sixth single "Half Light" (featuring Tom Cane) charted at number 25 in the UK, making it Wilkinson's second top 40 single. It was released on 1 June 2014.

Since the release of Lazers Not Included, Wilkinson has worked on music with Katy B, Wretch 32, Angel Haze and Knytro. On 14 July 2014, a new single entitled "Dirty Love" premiered on MistaJam's BBC Radio 1Xtra show. The song features vocals from Talay Riley, and was released on 12 October 2014. The song later featured on the "extended edition" of Lazers Not Included, which was released on 20 October 2014. This new edition of his debut album, originally titled Lazers Not Included 2.0, was to be released on 18 August 2014 and was to feature six previously unheard songs. However, these plans were scrapped and the extended edition instead featured numerous remixes of and by Wilkinson alongside the new single.

On 2 October 2014, he embarked on his Lazers Not Included tour with support from Etherwood, I See Monstas and Toyboy & Robin on selected dates. The tour began in Bournemouth and finished in Cambridge. A new song with Shannon Saunders (with whom he is in a relationship), entitled "Breathe", premiered in Bournemouth. His next single, a collaboration with TC entitled "Hit the Floor", was released exclusively to Beatport on 12 January 2015 and elsewhere on 26 January. The song was pressed to a number of limited edition picture discs for Record Store Day 2015. On 6 March 2015, his next single entitled "Hopelessly Coping" (featuring Thabo) premiered on Annie Mac's Radio 1 show. It was released on 17 May 2015 alongside remixes from Gorgon City, René LaVice, Preditah and Hanami. The song entered the UK Singles Chart at number 49. On 24 August 2015, "Breathe" was released as a free download, accompanied by a music video. The song is also available on digital retailers.

=== 2016–2018: Hypnotic ===
"Flatline", the lead single from Wilkinson's forthcoming second studio album, Hypnotic, features vocals from Wretch 32 and was released on 12 March 2016. This was followed by "What", featuring uncredited vocals from MC Ad-Apt and "Sweet Lies", featuring vocals from Karen Harding. Hypnotic was released on 21 April 2017. He released the song "Rush" with Dimension in November 2017.

In 2018, Wilkinson released the singles "Take It Up" (with Sub Focus), "Decompression" and "I Need" (featuring Hayla). 2019 saw the release of the UKF10 sampler which contained Wilkinson's song "Machina".

=== 2019–2021: Portals and Sleepless Music ===
In September 2019, Wilkinson and Sub Focus released "Illuminate" as a first single for their album Portals, released on 9 October 2020. Their second single, "Just Hold On", came out in April 2020. In July 2020, it was announced that Wilkinson is scheduled to perform at the 2021 SW4 (South West Four Weekender) festival. Later singles to follow were "Air I Breathe", "Turn the Lights Off" and "Freedom" featuring Empara Mi.

On 18 February 2021, Wilkinson announced the launch of his new record label, Sleepless Music (a copy of a pre-existing label, Sleepless Records of Liverpool). The label would go on to release future Wilkinson music and include releases from the likes of S.P.Y, Fred V, Krakota and many more.

=== 2022–present: Cognition ===
After releasing the singles "Frontline", "If You Want It", "Keep Dancing" (featuring Amber Van Day) and "Used to This" (featuring Issey Cross, No. 14 on the UK Dance Singles Chart) in 2021, Wilkinson announced his fourth studio album Cognition, released in February 2022.

In 2022, the singles "Close Your Eyes" (featuring Iiola) and "Here for You" (with Becky Hill) were released.

The artwork for Cognition was a collaborative effort with Folkestone-based collage artist Charlie Elms, also known as 10 Years Time.

== Personal life ==
Wilkinson married long-term partner Shannon Saunders in August 2024.

== Discography ==
=== Studio albums ===
Title	Album details	Peak chart positions			Certifications
Title	Album details	UK	UK Dance	NZ	Certifications
Lazers Not Included	Released: 28 October 2013; Label: RAM; Format: CD, digital download	46	2	—	BPI: Silver
Hypnotic	Released: 21 April 2017; Label: RAM; Format: CD, digital download	41	1	—	
Portals (with Sub Focus)	Released: 9 October 2020; Label: Virgin EMI; Format: CD, digital download	68	1	26	
Cognition	Released: 11 February 2022; Label: Sleepless; Format: CD, digital download	78	1	3	
Infinity	Released: 27 March 2026; Label: Sleepless; Format: CD, digital download	—	2	31	

=== Singles ===
Year	Single	Peak chart positions				Certifications	Album
Year	Single	UK	UK Dance	BEL	SCO	Certifications	Album
2010	"Moonwalker / Samurai"	—	—	—	—		Non-album singles
2011	"Every Time / Overdose"	—	—	—	—		Non-album singles
2011	"Tonight / Pistol Whip"	—	—	—	—		Non-album singles
2012	"Automatic / Hands Up!"	—	—	—	—		Non-album singles
2012	"Need to Know / Direction" (featuring Iman)	195	39	—^{[a]}	—		Lazers Not Included
2013	"Take You Higher / Crunch"	—	35	—	—	RMNZ: Platinum	Lazers Not Included
2013	"Heartbeat" (featuring P Money and Arlissa)	169	36	—	—		Lazers Not Included
2013	"Afterglow" (featuring Becky Hill)^{[b]}	8	1	—^{[c]}	15	BPI: 3× Platinum; RMNZ: 5× Platinum	Lazers Not Included
2014	"Too Close" (featuring Detour City)	55	14	78	83		Lazers Not Included
2014	"Half Light" (featuring Tom Cane)	25	9	133	28	RMNZ: Gold	Lazers Not Included
2014	"Dirty Love" (featuring Talay Riley)	20	5	99	27	RMNZ: Gold	Lazers Not Included (extended version)
2015	"Hit the Floor" (with TC)	—	—	—	—		Non-album singles
2015	"Hopelessly Coping" (featuring Thabo)	49	11	—	60		Non-album singles
2016	"Flatline" (featuring Wretch 32)	—	—	—	—		Hypnotic
2016	"What"	—	—	—	—		Non-album single
2016	"Sweet Lies" (featuring Karen Harding)	—	34	—	98	BPI: Silver; RMNZ: Gold	Hypnotic
2016	"Brand New"	—	—	—	—		Hypnotic
2017	"We Will Be" (featuring Matt Wills)	—	—	—	—		Hypnotic
2017	"Wash Away (Calling for You)" (featuring Boy Matthews)	—	—	—	—	RMNZ: Platinum	Hypnotic
2017	"Rush" (with Dimension)	—	—	—	—		Non-album singles
2018	"Decompression"	—	—	—	—		Non-album singles
2018	"Take It Up" (with Sub Focus)	—	—	92	—	RMNZ: Gold	Non-album singles
2018	"I Need" (featuring Hayla)	—	—	—	—	RMNZ: Gold	Non-album singles
2019	"All for You" (featuring Karen Harding)	—	—	—	—	BPI: Silver; RMNZ: Platinum	Non-album singles
2019	"Illuminate" (with Sub Focus)	—	—	—	—	RMNZ: Platinum	Portals
2020	"Just Hold On" (with Sub Focus)	—	—	—	—		Portals
2020	"Air I Breathe" (with Sub Focus)	—	—	—	85	RMNZ: Gold	Portals
2020	"Turn the Lights Off" (with Sub Focus)	—	—	—	—		Portals
2021	"Freedom" (with Sub Focus featuring Empara Mi)	—	—	—	—	RMNZ: Gold	Portals
2021	"Frontline"	—	—	—	—		Cognition
2021	"Keep Dancing" (featuring Amber Van Day)	—	—	99	—	RMNZ: Gold	Cognition
2021	"If You Want It"	—	—	—	—		Cognition
2021	"Used to This" (featuring Issey Cross)	33	11	—	—	BPI: Gold; RMNZ: Platinum	Cognition
2022	"Close Your Eyes" (featuring Iiola)	—	—	—	—		Cognition
2023	"Infinity" (featuring Ilira, Iiola and Tom Cane)	—	—	—	—		Infinity
2024	"Never B Mine" (with Kioto Bug)	—	—	—	—		Infinity
2024	"This Moment" (featuring Kelli-Leigh)	—	—	—	—		Infinity
2024	"Balance" (with North)	—	—	—	—	RMNZ: Gold	Infinity
2024	"Break It Down" (featuring Emily Makis)	—	—	—	—		Infinity
2024	"Shine On" (with Kaskade and Paige Cavell)	—	—	—	—		Infinity
2025	"Back to Life" (featuring Julia Church)	—	—	—	—		Infinity
2025	"Lose Control" (with Camo & Krooked and Mefjus featuring Ilira)	—	—	—	—		Infinity
2025	"Come Down"	—	—	—	—		Infinity
2025	"Back Up" (featuring Iiola)	—	—	—	—		Infinity
2026	"Eternity" (featuring Mougleta)	—	—	—	—		Infinity
"—" denotes single that did not chart or was not released.

=== Featured singles ===
Year	Title	Album
2022	"Paradise" (Bru-C featuring Wilkinson)	Family Only

=== Promotional singles ===
Year	Title	Certiifcations	Album
2013	"Tonight"^{[d]}	RMNZ: Gold	Lazers Not Included
2015	"Breathe" (featuring Shannon Saunders)	RMNZ: Platinum	Hypnotic

=== Other charted songs ===
Year	Song	Peak chart positions				Certifications	Album
Year	Song	UK	UK Dance	NZ	NZ Hot	Certifications	Album
2022	"Here for You" (with Becky Hill)	43	12	8	—	BPI: Silver; RMNZ: Platinum	Cognition
2022	"XTC" (remix) (with Solardo and Eli Brown)	—	—	—	10		Cognition
2022	"Release Valve"	—	—	—	14		Cognition
2022	"No One Else" (with Kanine and Clementine Douglas)	—	—	—	12		Cognition
2022	"On Your Mind" (with Amber Van Day)	—	—	—	34		Cognition
2026	"Ultraviolet" (featuring Katy Alex)	—	—	—	14		Infinity

=== Other appearances ===
Year	Song	Release	Label
2010	"Hypnosis"	Sick Music 2	Hospital
2010	"Scream It"^{[e]}	Andy C: Nightlife 5	RAM
2011	"Refugee"	RAM 100	RAM
2011	"Get into It" (with Cyantific)	Touch Me / Get into It	RAM
2012	"Blender Bass"	Non-album single	Self-released
2013	"Casino"^{[f]}	Andy C: Nightlife 6	RAM
2019	"Machina"	UKF10 – 10 Years of UKF	UKF

=== Remixes ===
Year	Song	Artist
2010	"Hold the Line" (with Cyantific)	Major Lazer
2010	"Oxytocin" (with Cyantific)	Kid Adrift
2010	"Box of Secrets" (with Cyantific)	Zarif
2011	"Under the Stars"	Morning Parade
2011	"Time"	Chase & Status featuring Delilah
2011	"Reaching Out"	Nero
2011	"Midnight Run"	Example
2012	"Pixelated People"	Jess Mills
2012	"Remedy"	Professor Green featuring Ruth-Anne
2012	"Pure Gold"	Calyx and Teebee featuring Kemo
2012	"Breaking"	Syron
2013	"Reload"	Wiley featuring Chip
2013	"Fade"	Jakwob featuring Maiday
2013	"Think About It"	Naughty Boy featuring Wiz Khalifa and Ella Eyre
2013	"Too Close VIP"	Wilkinson
2013	"Overdose VIP"	Wilkinson
2014	"Direction VIP"	Wilkinson
2014	"Sing"	Ed Sheeran
2014	"Pardon Me" (with Professor Green and Laura Mvula)	Naughty Boy featuring Ava Stokes
2014	"Go All Night"	Gorgon City featuring Jennifer Hudson
2015	"Wild Frontier"	The Prodigy
2016	"Be Bold"	Tam Cooper
2017	"Skin"	Rag'n'Bone Man
2018	"I Need" (with Metrik)	Wilkinson featuring Hayla
2020	"Just Hold On" (with Sub Focus vs. Pola & Bryson)	Sub Focus and Wilkinson
2021	"Freedom" (with Sub Focus vs. High Contrast)	Sub Focus and Wilkinson featuring Empara Mi
2021	"Turn Back Time"	Diplo and Sonny Fedora
2021	"Rock It"	Sub Focus
2022	"XTC"	Solardo and Eli Brown
2023	"Miracle"	Calvin Harris and Ellie Goulding
2023	"The Last Goodbye"	Odesza featuring Bettye LaVette
2024	"Shiver"	John Summit featuring Hayla
2025	"Yosemite"	Kettama and Interplanetary Criminal

=== Production credits ===
Year	Title	Artist	Album
2012	"Breaking" (co-produced by Woz)	Syron	Non-album single
2014	"Merlin (Everybody Knows)" (co-produced by David Etherington and Jay Reynolds)	Detour City	Non-album single
2014	"6 Words" (co-produced by Mikey Muzik and Mo-Samuels)	Wretch 32	Growing Over Life
2016	"So Far Away" (co-produced by Geeneus)	Katy B featuring Stamina MC	Honey
