= René LaVice =

Canadian music producer, disc jockey, and singer (born 1990)

- Born: René LaVice; 31 May 1990 (age 35)
- Origin: Toronto, Canada
- Genres: Drum and bass; house; dubstep; hip hop
- Occupations: Record producer; remixer; singer
- Years active: 2010–present
- Labels: DeVice (2020-present); RAM Records (2012–2019); Machinist Music (2012); Rubik Digital (2011); Stride Recordings (2010)

René LaVice (born 31 May 1990) is a Canadian electronic music producer, DJ, and singer.

== Biography ==
His song "The Calling", featuring Ivy Mairi, entered the UK Singles Chart at number 118 following a placement on BBC Radio 1's A List playlist. The song also featured as the station's Track of the Day and appeared on its In New Music We Trust playlist. LaVice has also officially remixed the likes of Nero, Wilkinson, Rudimental and A-Trak and supported The Prodigy on their 2015 UK arena tour.

In October 2017, it was announced that LaVice would be taking over as host of BBC Radio 1's long-running drum and bass show, from the previous host of 6 years, Friction (who took over from Fabio & Grooverider), in November 2017. His final show was on 29 August 2022.

== Discography ==
=== Studio albums ===
Title	Album details	Peak chart positions	
Title	Album details	UK	UK Dance
Insidious	Released: 11 February 2013; Label: RAM Records; Format: Digital download, CD	—	25
Play with Fire	Released: 27 November 2015; Label: RAM Records; Format: Digital download, CD	—	—
Far From Perfect	Released: 25 May 2018; Label: RAM Records; Format: Digital download, CD	—	—

=== Extended plays ===
Title	Details	Track listing
Vika	Released: 12 March 2012; Label: Machinist Music; Formats: Digital download	"Vika"; "Bass Kick"; "Brooklyn" (featuring John Rolodex); "Secrets" (featuring Trex)
Absolute Monster	Released: 22 July 2012; Label: RAM Records; Formats: Digital download	"Dank"; "Meow"; "Absolute Monster"; "Dungeon"; "Headlock VIP"
Insidious Remixes, Part 1	Released: 8 September 2013; Label: RAM Records; Formats: Digital download	"Tap Dat" (Chords Remix); "Dark Passenger" (June Miller Remix)
Play with Fire (Deluxe)	Released: 20 May 2016; Label: RAM Records; Formats: Digital download	"Lights Out" (Revamped) (featuring David Boomah); "Public Xerox"; "Wave" (D&B Mix); "Wicked It Worked"
The Richter Scale EP	Released: 10 October 2016; Label: RAM Records; Formats: 12", Digital download	"Richter Scale" (D&B Mix); "Richter Scale" (House Mix); "Richter Scale" (Trap Mix); "Richter Scale" (Extended Multi-Genre Mix); "Some Things Never Change"

=== Singles ===
Year	Title	Peak chart positions			Album
Year	Title	UK	UK Dance	UK Indie	Album
2010	"Angel" / "Save Me VIP"	–	–	–	—N/a
2011	"Just Words" / "Spile"	–	–	–	—N/a
2012	"All My Trials" / "Not Deep" (featuring Ivy Mairi)	–	–	–	—N/a
2014	"Where My Ladies At?" / "I Want More"	–	–	–	Play with Fire
2015	"The Calling" / "Freudian" (featuring Ivy Mairi)	118	29	8	Play with Fire
2015	"Hotblooded" / "Bill Folderson"	–	–	–	Play with Fire
2015	"Air Force 1" / "Don't Look Down" (featuring BullySongs)	–	–	–	Play with Fire
2015	"Part of Me" / "Untribaled" (featuring BullySongs)	–	–	–	Play with Fire
2017	"Sound Barrier" / "Squeegee"	–	–	–	Non-album single
2017	"Woohoo"	–	–	–	Far From Perfect
2017	"Let You Go" (featuring Jareth)	–	–	–	Far From Perfect
2017	"Twilight" (featuring Faye)	–	–	–	Far From Perfect
2018	"Drop It"	–	–	–	Far From Perfect
2018	"Cold Crush" (featuring Gydra)	–	–	–	Far From Perfect
2018	"How Do I Kill"	–	–	–	Far From Perfect
2020	"Nine Strings / Eyes" (with Future Cut)	–	–	–	Non-album single
2020	"Hollywood" (featuring S.P.Y)	–	–	–	Non-album single
2020	"Showstoppaz" (featuring Ayo Beatz & Krishane)	–	–	–	Non-album single
2020	"Lockdown" (with A Plus)	–	–	–	Non-album single
2020	"1000 Days" (with Benny L)	–	–	–	Non-album single
2020	"Boomshaka" (with Danny Byrd)	–	–	–	Non-album single
2020	"Bad Luck" (with Jess Young)	–	–	–	Non-album single
2020	"Through the Fire" (featuring The Melody Men)	–	–	–	Non-album single
2021	"I've Been Waiting" (with Richter & Dr. Apollo featuring Gracie Van Brunt)	–	–	–	Non-album single
2021	"Jump" (with Stanton Warriors featuring Knytro & Deadly)	–	–	–	Non-album single
2021	"Darkness"	–	–	–	Non-album single
2021	"Budz"	–	–	–	Non-album single
2021	"Good Life" (featuring Ayah Marar)	–	–	–	Non-album single
2021	"Lose Control" (with Current Value)	–	–	–	Exposed 001
2021	"Skreech"	–	–	–	Non-album single
2022	"Cyantivice" (with Cyantific)	–	–	–	Non-album single
2022	"Tonight I'm Dying" (with Mollie Collins and Leo Wood)	–	–	–	Non-album single
2023	"Fall from the Dark" (with RAIGN)	–	–	–	Non-album single
2023	"Set Pace" (with Chords)	–	–	–	Non-album single
2023	"Molten Euphoria"	–	–	–	Non-album single
"—" denotes a single that did not chart or was not released.

=== Remixes ===
Year	Artist	Release
2011	Secret Society, Outrage & Kirsty Hawkshaw	"Let Us Think" (with Gremlinz)
2013	Loadstar	"Eat My Tears"
2014	Mutt	"Conversations" (with Gremlinz)
2014	Chris Lake (featuring Jareth)	"Helium"
2014	Jillionaire & Salvatore Ganacci (featuring Sanjin)	"Fresh"
2015	Rae Morris	"Love Again" (René LaVice's UGLY Remix)
2015	A-Trak (featuring Andrew Wyatt)	"Push"
2015	Wilkinson (featuring THABO)	"Hopelessly Coping" (René LaVice's Hopelessly Doomed Remix)
2015	Nero	"The Thrill" (René LaVice's Thrillseeking Remix)
2015	The Prodigy	"Rebel Radio" (René LaVice's Start a Fucking Riot Remix)
2016	MOUNT & Nicolas Haelg	"Something Good"
2016	Mampi Swift	"Soldiers"
2017	Anton Powers & Pixie Lott	"Baby"
2017	Delta Heavy	"Kaleidoscope"
2017	Digital & Outrage	"Red Letter" (René LaVice's Insufficient Funds Remix)
2017	BLISS (featuring Fem Fel)	"I Wanna Feel" (René LaVice's Feel the Bass Crunch D&B Remix)
2017	DJ Fresh & Diplo (featuring R. City, Selah Sue & Craig David)	"Bang Bang" (René LaVice's Trigger Happy Remix)
2018	Jareth	"Rings of Saturn"
2019	Grace Carter	"Heal Me"
2019	Stanton Warriors (featuring Sian Evans)	"Up2U" (René LaVice's Rooftop Remix)
2019	Benny Page (featuring $pyda)	"Gangster"
2019	Benny Page	"Turn the Lights Down" (with Brookes Brothers)
2019	One Bit & Laura White	"Back to You" (René LaVice's Jungle Remix)
2019	Reuben James	"I Know You Too Well"
2020	Snakehips & Jess Glynne (featuring A Boogie Wit da Hoodie & DaVido)	"Lie for You"
2020	Murdock (featuring James Marvel)	"Holding On"
2021	Dub Elements	"Thunder"
2021	The Prodigy (featuring RZA)	"Breathe" (with Liam Howlett) (Liam H And René LaVice Re-Amp)
2021	The Prodigy (featuring RZA)	"Breathe" (René LaVice Dark D&B Remix)
2022	State of the Nation (featuring Ghostface Killah & Killah Priest)	"Super Soldier" (René LaVice Jungle Remix)
2023	The Prodigy	"Mindfields"
2023	Chronicles of the Residuum	"Stormflight"
