= Arlissa =

British singer-songwriter (born 1992)

- Born: Arlissa Joann Ruppert; 21 September 1992 (age 34); Hanau, Hesse, Germany
- Origin: United Kingdom
- Genres: Pop; soul
- Occupations: Singer, songwriter
- Years active: 2012–present
- Label: Earth Angel Records
- Website: arlissa.os.fan

Arlissa Joann Ruppert (German pronunciation: [ˈʁʊpɛʁt]; born 21 September 1992), known professionally as Arlissa, is a German-born British singer and songwriter.

== Life and career ==
Arlissa Ruppert, known professionally as Arlissa, is a German-born, London-raised singer and songwriter, recognized for her emotionally charged and soulful music. Her mother is an American from Louisiana who served in the U.S. Army in Germany, and her German father provided her with a rich cultural background that influences her work.

Arlissa's music career took off with her debut track "Hard to Love Somebody", which caught the attention of a publisher who passed it along to rapper Nas. Nas was impressed and featured on the track, which became Scott Mills' Record of the Week on BBC Radio 1 in November 2012. Arlissa was subsequently named one of the BBC's artists to watch for 2013, making the longlist for the Sound of 2013.

Her first official single, "Sticks & Stones", released on 3 March 2013, was described as a "stomping break-up anthem". The song reached number 48 on the UK Singles Chart. In 2017, Nelly Furtado covered "Sticks and Stones" for her sixth studio album, The Ride.

In addition to her solo work, Arlissa has made significant contributions as a songwriter. She co-wrote K-pop group BTS's hit single "Spring Day", which topped the Gaon Digital Chart and surpassed 2,500,000 downloads. The song also won 'Song of the Year' at the 2017 Melon Music Awards.

In January 2018, she collaborated with British DJ/producer Jonas Blue on an EDM version of her song "Hearts Ain't Gonna Lie". In March 2018, Arlissa was selected as Elvis Duran's Artist of the Month and performed a live acoustic version of her single on NBC's Today Show.

Arlissa also contributed to the soundtrack of the 2018 film The Hate U Give, based on the novel by Angie Thomas. She co-wrote and performed the track "We Won't Move" which she performed at the film's international premiere at the 2018 Toronto Film Festival.

In 2020, Arlissa released the single "Healing".

On 17 June 2022 she announced the title of her debut album, The Open-Hearted, which was released on 6 October 2023. The album was preceded by the singles "Pieces", "Take", "Hard to Be", "My Heart Is on the Floor", and "Audacity".

== Discography ==
=== Studio albums ===
| Title | Details |
|---|---|
| The Open-Hearted | Released: 6 October 2023; Label: Earth Angel Records; Formats: Digital download, streaming, CD |
| Starlet Harlot | Released: 2027; Label: Earth Angel Records; Formats: Digital download, streaming, CD |

=== Extended plays ===
| Title | Details |
|---|---|
| The Lovers | Released: 12 February 2021; Label: BigBootyRecords; Formats: Digital download, streaming, CD |

=== Singles ===
==== As lead artist ====
| Year | Title | Peak chart positions | | | Certifications | Album |
| Year | Title | UK | IRE | US Dance | Certifications | Album |
|---|---|---|---|---|---|---|
| 2012 | "Hard to Love Somebody" (with Nas) | 165 | — | — | | Battles (unreleased) |
| 2013 | "Sticks & Stones" | 48 | 89 | — | | Battles (unreleased) |
| 2013 | "Into the Light" | — | — | — | | Battles (unreleased) |
| 2018 | "Hearts Ain't Gonna Lie" (with Jonas Blue) | — | — | 8 | BPI: Silver | Est. 1989 |
| 2018 | "We Won't Move" | — | — | 44 | | The Hate U Give |
| 2019 | "Running" | — | — | 12 | | Non-album singles |
| 2019 | "Do You Hear What I Hear?" | — | — | — | | Non-album singles |
| 2020 | "Healing" | — | — | — | | Non-album singles |
| 2020 | "The House We Live In" | — | — | — | | Non-album singles |
| 2020 | "Little Girl" | — | — | — | | The Lovers EP |
| 2020 | "Old Love" | — | — | — | | The Lovers EP |
| 2021 | "Rules" | — | — | — | | The Lovers EP |
| 2021 | "House of Cards" | — | — | — | | The Lovers EP |
| 2021 | "The Devil You Know" | — | — | — | | The Lovers EP |
| 2022 | "Pieces" (featuring DUCKWRTH) | — | — | — | | The Open-Hearted |
| 2022 | "Melody" (with DLMT and TELYKast) | — | — | — | | Non-album single |
| 2022 | "Take" | — | — | — | | The Open-Hearted |
| 2022 | "Don't Txt Your Ex!" | — | — | — | | Non-album singles |
| 2022 | "Walking on the Moon" | — | — | — | | Non-album singles |
| 2023 | "Games" | — | — | — | | Non-album singles |
| 2023 | "Hard to Be" | — | — | — | | The Open-Hearted |
| 2023 | "My Heart Is on the Floor" | — | — | — | | The Open-Hearted |
| 2023 | "Audacity" | — | — | — | | The Open-Hearted |
| 2023 | "Therapist" | — | — | — | | The Open-Hearted |
| 2024 | "Only Sorry" | — | — | — | | Non-album singles |
| 2024 | "Same Road" | — | — | — | | Non-album singles |
| 2024 | "Hearts Ain't Gonna Lie 2024" | — | — | — | | Non-album singles |
| 2026 | "Now!" | — | — | — | | Starlet Harlot |
| 2026 | "Memory of You" | — | — | — | | Starlet Harlot |
| 2026 | "A Girl Just Wants To Be..." | — | — | — | | Starlet Harlot |
| 2026 | "Turn My World To Colour" | — | — | — | | Starlet Harlot |
| 2026 | "Skin & Bones" | — | — | — | | Starlet Harlot |
| 2026 | "Delicate Feelings" | — | — | — | | Starlet Harlot |
"—" denotes single that did not chart or was not released.

==== As featured artist ====
| Year | Title | Album |
|---|---|---|
| 2013 | "Heartbeat" (Wilkinson featuring P Money and Arlissa) | Lazers Not Included |
| 2013 | "Long Gone Memory" (Friction featuring Arlissa) | Non-album single |
| 2015 | "Something About You" (TC4 featuring Arlissa) | Something About You EP |
| 2016 | "Touch" (Tough Love featuring Arlissa) | Past Present Future (unreleased) |
| 2016 | "Blow" (Jacky Greco featuring Snoop Dogg, Arlissa and Jakk City) | Non-album single |
| 2017 | "Champagne on Me" (Lotus featuring Arlissa and Flo Rida) | Non-album single |
| 2024 | "She Ride the Wind" (Life on Planets featuring Arlissa) | Non-album single |

=== Other appearances ===
| Year | Contribution | Album |
|---|---|---|
| 2013 | "Tornare indietro" (Guè Pequeno featuring Arlissa) | Bravo ragazzo |
| 2016 | "Paradise" (Schiller featuring Arlissa) | Future |
| 2016 | "Not in Love" (Schiller featuring Arlissa) | Future |
| 2016 | "Stay Up with Me" (Netsky featuring Arlissa) | 3 |
| 2019 | "Eyes Off You" (M-22, Arlissa and Kiana Ledé) | Charlie's Angels |

=== Writer/co-writer for other artists ===
| Year | Contribution | Album |
|---|---|---|
| 2017 | "Spring Day" BTS | You Never Walk Alone |
| 2017 | "First Time" M-22 featuring Medina | Non-album single |
| 2019 | "Flickers" Wrabel | One of Those Happy People |
| 2019 | "Flames" R3hab, Zayn and Jungleboi | Non-album single |
