= Make You Mine (Talay Riley song) =

Single by Talay Riley

from the album Going to California
- Released: 28 August 2011
- Recorded: 2011
- Genre: R&B; pop
- Length: 3:22
- Label: Jive; Sony Music Entertainment
- Songwriters: Mischke Butler; Dean Josiah Mundle; Mark Olayinka Orabiyi

Talay Riley singles chronology
"Good As Gold" (2011)	"Make You Mine" (2011)	"Resonance" (2014)

"Make You Mine" is a song recorded by the British singer Talay Riley. The song was released as a single on 28 August 2011 as a digital download in the United Kingdom from his cancelled debut album Talay Riley. It was later released on his mixtape, Going to California. The remix was produced by Quiz & Larossi and mixed by Manny Marroquin.

== Music video ==
A music video to accompany the release of "Make You Mine" was first released onto YouTube on 4 July 2011 at a total length of three minutes and twenty seconds.

== Track listing ==
UK Digital download
No.	Title	Length
1.	"Make You Mine"	3:22
2.	"Make You Mine" (Alternative Edit)	3:08
3.	"Make You Mine" (7th Heaven Club Mix)	6:58

== Chart performance ==
On 4 September 2011 the song entered the UK Singles Chart at number 57 and number 17 on the UK R&B Chart. This marks Rileys first song to chart as a solo artist.

=== Charts ===
Chart (2011)	Peak position
UK Hip Hop/R&B (Official Charts)	17
UK Singles (The Official Charts Company)	57

== Release history ==
Country	Release date	Format	Label
United Kingdom	26 August 2011	Digital download	Jive, Sony Music Entertainment
