= Take You Higher (Wilkinson song) =

"Take You Higher / Crunch"

Single by Wilkinson

from the album Lazers Not Included
- Released: 24 March 2013
- Genre: Drum and bass
- Length: 4:47
- Label: RAM
- Songwriter(s): Mark Wilkinson
- Producer(s): Wilkinson

Wilkinson singles chronology
"Need to Know / Direction" (2012)	"Take You Higher / Crunch" (2013)	"Heartbeat" (2013)

Music video
- "Take You Higher" on YouTube

"Take You Higher" is a song by the British record producer Wilkinson. It was released on 24 March 2013, through RAM Records, as the second single from his debut album Lazers Not Included. The single includes the AA-side song "Crunch", which is not included on the album, and remixes from Jakwob and Foamo. The song has peaked at number 35 on the UK Dance Chart, four places higher that its previous single "Need to Know", yet the song failed to make an entry on the UK Singles Chart. Although, the song has managed to chart at number 21 in the UK Independent Chart and at number 14 in the Dance Bubbling Under chart in Belgium.

== Track listing ==
Digital download
No.	Title	Length
1.	"Take You Higher"	4:47
2.	"Crunch"	4:09
3.	"Take You Higher" (Jakwob remix)	5:01
4.	"Take You Higher" (Foamo remix)	6:05
5.	"Take You Higher" (radio edit)	3:03
6.	"Take You Higher" (instrumental)	4:47

== Chart performance ==
=== Weekly charts ===
Chart (2013)	Peak position
Belgium (Ultratop Flanders Dance Bubbling Under)	14
UK Indie (OCC)	21
UK Dance (OCC)	35

== Certifications ==
Certifications for "Take You Higher"
Region	Certification	Certified units/sales
New Zealand (RMNZ)	Platinum	30,000^{‡}
^{‡} Sales+streaming figures based on certification alone.

== Release history ==
Region	Date	Format	Label
United Kingdom	3 April 2013 (EP)	Digital download	RAM
