= Shannon Saunders =

English musical artist

- Born: Shannon Rebecca Saunders; 4 July 1994 (age 32)
- Origin: Wiltshire, England
- Genre: Indie pop
- Occupations: Singer; songwriter
- Instruments: Vocals; guitar; keyboard
- Years active: 2011–present
- Labels: Lovejoy; Caroline International

Shannon Rebecca Saunders (born 4 July 1994), known professionally as iiola is an English singer and songwriter from Wiltshire, South West England.

== Early life ==
Saunders started writing and producing songs at the age of 13. She attended the Royal Wootton Bassett Academy and the Stagecoach Drama School.

She left school at sixteen to study song writing at BIMM in Bristol for a year before moving to London to pursue her career.

== Career ==
In 2009 Saunders was inspired by Justin Bieber to start a YouTube channel, where she posted covers of songs, as well as her own originals. As of April 2026, she has over 56,900 subscribers and more than 2 million total upload views.

=== Shannon Saunders ===
Based on her YouTube channel, Disney Channel UK asked Saunders to audition for My Camp Rock, which she won in 2010. Later than year Saunders sang "I See the Light" for the UK release of Tangled. In 2011 she sang "The Glow" for a London event promoting the induction of Rapunzel to the Disney Princess franchise.

Her first single, "Heart of Blue", was released under the name Shannon Saunders on her own label, Lovejoy Records. It peaked at #48 on the iTunes charts. The music video production costs was nine pounds, featured Saunders running barefoot through Oxford Street, London filmed by Damian Weilers.

In 2014 Saunders released two singles: "Sheets" and "Silly Little Things". In 2015, she released an EP through Caroline International titled Instar. frumhere sampled her song "LO-FI," co-written and produced by Dee Adam, on his track "She only likes me when i'm drunk".

Saunders again teamed up with director Damian Weilers to create a music video for her song "Pure" (produced and co-written by Mark Wilkinson and Dee Adam). The video was shot at Reynisfjara, the black-sand beach found on the south coast of Iceland, and had minimal electronic elements and electric guitar.

"Rips in your Jeans" was released in 2017 and with a video shot by Saunders with the help of Raja Virdi in East London's vintage store Atika.

The last track released under Saunders' birth name, "Still", was created as an awareness track for mental health issues and was supported by Heads Together, a charity under The Royal Foundation umbrella.

=== iiola ===
In 2018 Saunders released her debut four track EP titled Chrysalis under her new artist's name iiola. Spotify UK added all three singles from Chrysalis to New Music Fridays. Live stripped back versions of the first two singles are available on YouTube.

== Personal life ==
Saunders' married long term partner Mark Wilkinson (stage name Wilkinson) in August 2024. Saunders has Romani heritage.

== Discography ==
=== Extended plays ===
Title	Album details	Peak chart positions	
Title	Album details	UK iTunes	UK iTunes Pop
Instar	Released: 18 May 2015; Label: Lovejoy, Caroline International; Format: Digital download, vinyl	144	37
