= Polar (musician) =

- Also known as: K Jef Dam; Jazzasins; Teebee & K Minor Blow
- Origin: Bergen, Norway
- Genres: Drum and bass Neurofunk; Ambient; Electro; Electronica; Breakbeat
- Years active: 1996–present
- Labels: Certificate 18; Subtitles Music; Warm Communications; Breakbeat Science

Kjetil Dale Sagstad, better known by his stage name Polar or K, is a Norwegian electronic music artist.

== Career ==
After developing contact with Moving Shadow and Rugged Vinyl, K released Jazzassins 'Compass' for R&S Records in 1997. Releases followed on Beatservice and Moving Shadow. The mini LP '37 Degrees and Falling' followed. The singles 'Mind Of A Killer', 'Skydiver', and '5am' were released throughout 2000. 2001 saw the release of his 'Still Moving' album. The 'White Chambers' EP was released in December 2001. In 2002, K began working on his 3rd solo album 'Out of the Blue'. That same year also saw Polar releases on Metaformal, Breakbeat science, Thermal Recordings, Fenetik, FAT! and his own label Subtitles Music, founded together with Teebee. In 2008, the fourth Polar solo LP titled 'In the end' was released.

== Discography (Albums only) ==
- Black Science Beatservice (with Teebee) (1999)
- 37°C. And Falling Certificate 18 (2000)
- Still Moving Certificate 18 (2001)
- Out Of The Blue Certificate 18 (2002)
- Dj Teebee & K - Presents the deeper side of drum & bass Subtitles Music (2002)
- In the end Warm Communications (November 2008)
