= I Need to Know =

I Need to Know may refer to:

- I Need to Know (TV series), a 1997–2002 Nigerian family-oriented series
- "I Need to Know" (Ledisi song), 2023
- "I Need to Know" (Marc Anthony song), 1999
- "I Need to Know" (Tom Petty and the Heartbreakers song), 1978
- "I Need to Know", a song by Cuban Link from Chain Reaction, 2005
- "I Need to Know", a song by Kris Allen from Kris Allen, 2009
- "I Need to Know", a song by Sleeping with Sirens from Gossip, 2017

== See also ==
- Need to Know (disambiguation)
