= Sweet Lies (Wilkinson song) =

Single by Wilkinson featuring Karen Harding

from the album Hypnotic
- Released: 9 September 2016
- Recorded: 2015
- Genre: Drum and bass
- Length: 3:27
- Label: RAM
- Songwriters: Will Jennings; Marshall Jefferson; Joe Sample; Shane Heneghan; Eamon Downes; Mark Wilkinson; Brad Ellis; Karen Harding; Jess Mills
- Producer: Wilkinson

Wilkinson singles chronology
"What" (2016)	"Sweet Lies" (2016)	"Brand New" (2016)

Karen Harding singles chronology
"Like I Can" (2016)	"Sweet Lies" (2016)	"Good for Me" (2016)

Music video
- "Sweet Lies" on YouTube

"Sweet Lies" is a song performed by British drum and bass music producer and DJ Wilkinson, featuring vocals from English singer Karen Harding. The song was released as a digital download on 9 September 2016 in the United Kingdom by RAM Records as the second single from his second studio album Hypnotic (2017). The song peaked at number 98 on the Scottish Singles Chart.

The song blends elements of "Street Life" by The Crusaders with "Sweet Harmony" by Liquid, which itself sampled from CeCe Rogers' seminal house track, "Someday".

== Music video ==
A music video to accompany the release of "Sweet Lies" was first released onto YouTube on 24 October 2016. The video has since accumulated over 14 million views.

== Track listing ==
Digital download
No.	Title	Length
1.	"Sweet Lies" (featuring Karen Harding)	3:27

== Charts ==
Chart (2016)	Peak position
Scotland Singles (Official Charts)	98
UK Dance (Official Charts)	34

== Certifications ==
Region	Certification	Certified units/sales
New Zealand (RMNZ)	Gold	15,000^{‡}
United Kingdom (BPI)	Silver	200,000^{‡}
^{‡} Sales+streaming figures based on certification alone.

== Release history ==
Region	Date	Format	Label
United Kingdom	9 September 2016	Digital download	RAM
