= Take Me Away (DJ S.K.T song) =

Single by DJ S.K.T
- Released: 29 May 2015
- Recorded: 2015
- Genre: Dance
- Length: 2:50
- Label: Atlantic
- Songwriters: J. Mills; A. Srock; B. Grace
- Producer: DJ S.K.T

"Take Me Away" is a song by British DJ S.K.T featuring guest vocals from English singer Rae. It heavily samples the lyrics of the song "Take Me Away", by The Final Cut and True Faith from 1989. It was released on 31 May 2015 as a digital download in the United Kingdom through Atlantic Records.

== Charts ==
Chart (2015)	Peak position
UK Singles (Official Charts)	19

== Certifications ==
Region	Certification	Certified units/sales
United Kingdom (BPI)	Gold	400,000^{‡}
^{‡} Sales+streaming figures based on certification alone.

== Release history ==
Region	Date	Format	Label
Ireland	29 May 2015	Digital download	Atlantic
United Kingdom	31 May 2015	Digital download	Atlantic
