= Need to Know (Wilkinson song) =

"Need to Know / Direction"

Single by Wilkinson featuring Iman

from the album Lazers Not Included
- Released: 2 December 2012
- Genre: Drum and bass
- Length: 4:26
- Label: RAM
- Songwriter(s): Mark Wilkinson; Michael Gray; Anthony Moriah; Jon Pearn
- Producer(s): Wilkinson

Wilkinson singles chronology
"Tonight / Pistol Whip" (2011)	"Need to Know / Direction" (2012)	"Take You Higher / Crunch" (2013)

Music video
- "Need to Know" on YouTube

"Need to Know" is a song by the British record producer Wilkinson, featuring vocals from London-based singer Iman Osman, simply known as Iman. It was released on 2 December 2012, through RAM Records, as the first single from his debut album Lazers Not Included. The single includes the double A-side song "Direction", which is not included on the album. The song has peaked at number 195 on the UK Singles Chart and number 27 on the UK Dance Chart, the song has also charted in Belgium. The lyrics are based on the song "Watcha Doing Now?" (Full Intention mix) by Anthony Moriah.

== Track listing ==
Digital download
No.	Title	Length
1.	"Need to Know" (featuring Iman)	4:26
2.	"Need to Know" (featuring Iman) (radio edit)	2:41
3.	"Direction"	4:47

== Chart performance ==
=== Weekly charts ===
Chart (2013)	Peak position
Belgium (Ultratip Bubbling Under Flanders)	55
UK Dance (OCC)	27
UK Indie (OCC)	12
UK Indie Breakers (Official Charts Company)	2
UK Singles (Official Charts Company)	195

== Release history ==
Region	Date	Format	Label
United Kingdom	2 December 2012	Digital download	RAM
