= Too Close (Wilkinson song) =

Single by Wilkinson featuring Detour City

from the album Lazers Not Included
- B-side: "Midnight"
- Released: 23 February 2014
- Recorded: 2013
- Genre: Drum and bass
- Length: 3:37
- Label: RAM; Virgin EMI
- Songwriters: Mark Wilkinson; Tabitha Benjamin
- Producer: Mark Wilkinson

Wilkinson singles chronology
"Afterglow" (2013)	"Too Close" (2014)	"Half Light" (2014)

Detour City singles chronology
"Too Close" (2014)	"Merlin (Everybody Knows)" (2014)

Music video
- "Too Close" on YouTube

"Too Close" is a song by the British record producer Wilkinson, featuring vocals from Detour City. It was released on 23 February 2014, through RAM Records, as the fifth single from his debut album Lazers Not Included. The song has peaked at number 55 on the UK Singles Chart and number 14 on the UK Dance Chart. The release also included remixes of the track by Catching Flies, Wookie, Frankee and Askery.

== Music video ==
A music video to accompany the release of "Too Close" was first released onto YouTube on 22 January 2014 at a total length of three minutes and thirty-nine seconds.

== Track listing ==
Digital download
No.	Title	Length
1.	"Too Close" (featuring Detour City)	3:37
2.	"Too Close VIP"	4:27
3.	"Too Close" (Wookie remix)	5:23
4.	"Too Close" (Catching Flies remix)	4:52
5.	"Too Close" (Frankee remix)	4:13
6.	"Too Close" (Askery remix)	4:21

Digital download – Beatport edition
No.	Title	Length
1.	"Too Close" (featuring Detour City)	3:37
2.	"Too Close VIP"	4:27
3.	"Too Close" (Wookie remix)	5:23
4.	"Too Close" (Catching Flies remix)	4:52
5.	"Too Close" (Frankee remix)	4:13
6.	"Too Close" (Askery remix)	4:21
7.	"Midnight"	4:35

Vinyl No. 1
No.	Title	Length
1.	"Too Close"	3:37
2.	"Too Close VIP"	4:27

Vinyl No. 2
No.	Title	Length
1.	"Too Close" (Frankee remix)	4:13
2.	"Midnight"	4:35

== Credits and personnel ==
- Vocals, writer – Tabitha Benjamin
- Producer, programming – Mark Wilkinson
- Trumpet – Ralph Lamb
- Label – RAM Records, Virgin EMI Records

== Charts ==
Chart (2014)	Peak position
Belgium (Ultratop 50 Flanders)	78
Scotland Singles (Official Charts)	83
UK Dance (Official Charts)	14
UK Singles (Official Charts)	55

== Release history ==
Region	Date	Format	Label
United Kingdom	23 February 2014	Digital download	RAM; Virgin EMI
