= Sticks & Stones (Arlissa song) =

2013 single by Arlissa

Single by Arlissa

from the album Battles (unreleased)
- Released: 3 March 2013
- Recorded: 2013
- Length: 3:36
- Label: London
- Songwriter(s): Arlissa Ruppert; Mark Taylor; Patrick Mascall; Jamie Scott

Arlissa singles chronology
"Hard to Love Somebody" (2012)	"Sticks & Stones" (2013)	"Into the Light" (2013)

"Sticks & Stones" (also written "Sticks and Stones") is a song by British singer and songwriter Arlissa, released on 3 March 2013 as the lead single from her scrapped debut album, Battles. The song was written by Arlissa, Mark Taylor, Patrick Mascall and Jamie Scott. It peaked at number 48 on the UK Singles Chart for the week ending 16 March 2013 and spent 3 weeks in the top 100.

== Charts ==
Chart (2013)	Peak position
Ireland (IRMA)	89
UK Singles (OCC)	48

== Metro and Nelly Furtado version ==
"Sticks & Stones"

Single by Metro and Nelly Furtado

from the album The Ride
- Released: 25 May 2018
- Recorded: 2017 (original version)
- Length: 3:24
- Label: Radikal
- Songwriter(s): Arlissa Ruppert; Mark Taylor; Patrick Mascall; Jamie Scott; Nelly Furtado
- Producer(s): Nelly Furtado; Brian Rawling; Mark Taylor

Nelly Furtado singles chronology
"Phoenix" (2017)	"Sticks & Stones" (2018)	"Eat Your Man" (2023)

"Sticks & Stones" is the dance version of Nelly Furtado's cover that she recorded for her 2017 album The Ride featuring the British production duo Metro (Brian Rawling and Mark Taylor). Impressed with Metro's remixes of her song, Furtado rerecorded the vocals from her cover on the new version, giving the single an electro-house feel.

The 2018 version became Furtado's seventh number one and Metro's first on Billboard's Dance Club Songs chart, reaching the summit, as well as reaching number 30 on the Hot Dance/Electronic Songs chart.

=== Track listings ===
EP

1. "Sticks & Stones" (original) – 3:34
2. "Sticks & Stones" (F9 remix edit) – 3:29
3. "Sticks & Stones" (F9 extended remix) – 7:20
4. "Sticks & Stones" (Chrome Tapes extended remix) – 5:50
5. "Sticks & Stones" (Mojito remix) – 3:47

Remixes

1. "Sticks & Stones" (StoneBridge & Damien Hall epic mix) – 3:23
2. "Sticks & Stones" (StoneBridge & Damien Hall epic extended mix) – 5:12
3. "Sticks & Stones" (StoneBridge & Damien Hall epic dubstrumental) – 5:12
4. "Sticks & Stones" (Bimbo Jones vocal mix) – 6:13
5. "Sticks & Stones" (Bimbo Jones Ibiza club mix) – 5:50
6. "Sticks & Stones" (Manuel Riva & Cristian Poow remix) – 8:24

=== Charts ===
Chart (2018)	Peak position
US Dance Club Songs (Billboard)	1
US Hot Dance/Electronic Songs (Billboard)	30
