= Dirty Love (song) =

Single by Wilkinson featuring Talay Riley

from the album Lazers Not Included
- B-side: "TC remix"
- Released: 12 October 2014
- Recorded: September 2013–19 May 2014
- Genre: Drum and bass
- Length: 3:43
- Label: RAM; Virgin EMI
- Songwriters: Mark Wilkinson; Talay Riley
- Producer: Wilkinson

Wilkinson singles chronology
| "Half Light" (2014) | "Dirty Love" (2014) | "Hit the Floor" (2015) |

Talay Riley singles chronology
| "Resonance" (2014) | "Dirty Love" (2014) | "Harder" (2017) |

Music video
- "Dirty Love" on YouTube

"Dirty Love" is a song by the British drum and bass producer Wilkinson. It features vocals from British singer Talay Riley. It was released on 12 October 2014 through RAM Records as the first single from the extended edition of his debut studio album Lazers Not Included, and the seventh single overall. The song entered the UK Singles Chart at number 20, after sitting at number 13 in the midweeks.

== Background and release ==
Originally set to be the seventh single from Lazers Not Included 2.0, "Dirty Love" was set to feature on the deluxe re-release of Wilkinson's debut album Lazers Not Included. The song was to be released on 21 September 2014, followed by the album on 18 August 2014, which was to feature six previously unheard tracks. However, the project was scrapped and the songs from it will feature on his second studio album that will be released in 2015. An "extended edition" of his debut album was released, however, and includes this song alongside remixes of and by Wilkinson.

== Music video ==
A music video to accompany the release of "Dirty Love" was first released onto YouTube on 27 August 2014. The video has since accumulated nearly 7,943,000 views as of 4 October 2018.

== Track listing ==
Digital download – single
| No. | Title | Length |
|---|---|---|
| 1. | "Dirty Love" (featuring Talay Riley) | 3:43 |

Digital download – EP
| No. | Title | Length |
|---|---|---|
| 1. | "Dirty Love" (TC remix) | 4:04 |
| 2. | "Dirty Love" (No Artificial Colours remix) | 5:43 |
| 3. | "Dirty Love" (DJ S.K.T remix) | 5:09 |
| 4. | "Dirty Love" (BMB Spacekid remix) | 4:56 |

12" vinyl
| No. | Title | Length |
|---|---|---|
| 1. | "Dirty Love" | 3:43 |
| 2. | "Dirty Love" (TC remix) | 4:04 |

== Charts ==
| Chart (2014) | Peak position |
|---|---|
| Belgium (Ultratip Bubbling Under Flanders) | 49 |
| Scottish Singles Sales (Official Charts) | 27 |
| UK Dance (Official Charts) | 5 |
| UK Singles (Official Charts) | 20 |

== Certifications ==
Certifications for "Dirty Love"
| Region | Certification | Certified units/sales |
|---|---|---|
| New Zealand (RMNZ) | Gold | 15,000^{‡} |
^{‡} Sales+streaming figures based on certification alone.
