= Talay Riley =

British singer-songwriter (1990–2026)

- Also known as: Tension
- Born: Mark Olabanji A. Olayinka A. Orabiyi; 10 July 1990; London, England
- Died: 5 June 2026 (aged 35) Silvertown, London, England
- Genres: R&B; pop
- Occupation: Singer-songwriter
- Instrument: Vocals
- Years active: 2006–2026
- Labels: Jive UK (2009–2012); Sony; RCA; Island (2015–2017)

Mark Olabanji A. Olayinka A. Orabiyi (10 July 1990 – 5 June 2026), known professionally as Tension and later as Talay Riley, was a Grammy Award-winning British singer-songwriter, who had a number of charting singles as a recording artist including his 2011 solo single "Make You Mine" and co-wrote hit singles for Chip, Wilkinson, Khalid and Kehlani among others. He was stabbed to death in June 2026 in Newham, London.

== Early life and career ==
Mark Olabanji A. Olayinka A. Orabiyi was born in London on 10 July 1990. From the age of sixteen, he appeared under the stage name Tension as a guest singer on a number of UK rap songs, including a feature on Lightnin's 2006 street single "Hard Life", which was supported by music video television channel Channel U. He subsequently appeared on another of Lightnin's singles from his Young & Gifted mixtape, "Brother Love", as well as three songs on Wretch 32's second mixtape Teachers' Training Day. At the age of 18, he signed his first major publishing deal with Global Publishing.

His first appearance as Talay Riley was in 2009, when he appeared on rapper Chipmunk's single "Look for Me" which peaked at number 7 on the UK Singles Chart. For the same album, he co-wrote the song "Oopsy Daisy" for Chipmunk and Ms. D, which reached number one in the UK. He later went on to sign with Major Label Jive/Sony Records. Talay toured with many UK/US artists including Skepta, Usher's Arena tour, and Trey Songz.

In the 2010s and 2020s, he primarily shifted his focus to writing songs for pop and R&B artists, including Dua Lipa, Britney Spears, Chris Brown, Ella Mai, Ellie Goulding and Nick Jonas among others. He and his brother Scribz Riley both won their first Grammy Awards for co-writing the 2020 H.E.R. song "Lights On". Other hits he co-wrote included Wilkinson and Becky Hill's 2013 drum and bass single "Afterglow", certified triple platinum in the United Kingdom and quintuple platinum in New Zealand, Khalid's 2017 single "Young Dumb & Broke", which charted at number 18 in the United States and number 17 in the United Kingdom, and Kehlani's 2025 single "Out the Window". He won six awards from the Broadcast Music Incorporated Foundation during his career, spanning their London Awards, Pop Awards and R&B/Hip-Hop Awards.

== Death ==
Riley was stabbed to death on 5 June 2026 in Silvertown, London at the age of 35. A man was arrested on suspicion of murder but was later released without charge.

== Discography ==
=== Mixtapes ===
- Going to California (2011)

=== Singles ===
==== As lead artist ====
Title	Year	Peak chart positions		Album
Title	Year	UK	UK R&B	Album
"Humanoid"	2010	—	—	Non-album singles
"Sergeant Smash"	2011	—	—	Non-album singles
"Good As Gold" (featuring Scorcher)	2011	—	—	Going to California
"Make You Mine"	2011	57	17	Going to California
"Not Enough"	2016	—	—	Non-album singles

==== As featured artist ====
Title	Year	Peak chart positions			Album
Title	Year	UK	UK Dance	UK R&B	Album
"Look for Me" (Chip featuring Talay Riley)	2009	7	—	3	I Am Chipmunk
"It's All Love" (Scorcher featuring Talay Riley)	2012	—	—	—	Non-album single
"Resonance" (LuvBug featuring Talay Riley)	2014	13	4	—	TBA
"Dirty Love" (Wilkinson featuring Talay Riley)	2014	20	5	—	Lazers Not Included (Extended Edition)
"Harder" (Tiësto and Kshmr featuring Talay Riley)	2017	—	—	—	TBA
"Zero After Zero" (KRSNA and Kshmr featuring Talay Riley)	2023	—	—	—	KARAM

== Writing discography ==
Year	Artist	Album	Song
2007	Wretch 32	Teachers' Training Day	"Set Him Up" (featuring Sincere and Tension)
2007	Wretch 32	Teachers' Training Day	"Cycle" (featuring Tension)
2007	Wretch 32	Teachers' Training Day	"Alleyway" (featuring Tension)
2009	Chipmunk	I Am Chipmunk	"Beast"
2009	Chipmunk	I Am Chipmunk	"Look for Me" (featuring Talay Riley)
2009	Chipmunk	I Am Chipmunk	"Lose My Life" (featuring N-Dubz)
2009	Chipmunk	I Am Chipmunk	"Oopsy Daisy"
2010	Tinie Tempah	Disc-Overy	"Snap"
2011	Jessie J	Who You Are	"Who's Laughing Now"
2011	JLS	Jukebox	"Take You Down"
2011	JLS	Jukebox	"Unstoppable"
2011	JPM	Moonwalk	"Never Give Up"
2012	Ellie Goulding	Halcyon	"In My City"
2012	Aleks Josh	Cruise	"Blue"
2012	Aleks Josh	Cruise	"Cruise"
2012	Aleks Josh	Cruise	"Young Fun & Foolish"
2012	Lawson	Chapman Square	"Everywhere You Go"
2012	Chris Rene	I'm Right Here	"Tidal Wave"
2012	Scorcher	Non-album single	"It's All Love" (featuring Talay Riley)
2012	Scorcher	Non-album single	"It's All Love (Remix)" (featuring Kano, Wretch 32, Bashy and Talay Riley)
2013
2013	Big Time Rush	24/Seven	"Love Me Again"
2013	Misha B	Non-album single	"Here's to Everything (Ooh La La)"
2013	Iggy Azalea	The New Classic	"Bounce"
2013	Rascals	Non-album single	"Fire Blaze"
2013	Wiley	The Ascent	"Reload"
2014	Wilkinson	Lazers Not Included	"Afterglow"
2014	Wilkinson	Lazers Not Included	"Dirty Love" (featuring Talay Riley)
2014	Luke James	Luke James	"Exit Wounds"
2014	Luke James	Luke James	"Time X (Interlude)"
2014	LuvBug	Non-album single	"Resonance" (featuring Talay Riley)
2015	Allen Stone	Radius	"Freedom"
2015	Allen Stone	Radius	"Barbwire"
2015	Nathan Sykes	Unfinished Business	"More Than You'll Ever Know"
2015	Nathan Sykes	Unfinished Business	"Twist"
2015	Austin Mahone	Dirty Work	"Dirty Work"
2015	Timeflies	Just for Fun	"Worse Things Than Love" (featuring Natalie La Rose)
2015	Prince Royce	Double Vision	"Seal It With A Kiss"
2015	Jess Glynne	I Cry When I Laugh	"You Can Find Me"
2015	Trey Songz	Intermission I & II	"Do It Now"
2015	Abraham Mateo	Are You Ready?	"Are You Ready?"
2015	Abraham Mateo	Are You Ready?	"Mueve"
2015	Usher	TBA	"Miracles"
2015	Nick Jonas	Nick Jonas 2.0	"Levels"
2015	Pentatonix	Pentatonix	"Cracked"
2015	Chris Brown	Royalty	"Zero"
2015	Chris Brown	Royalty	"Fine by Me"
2015	Empire	TBC	"Powerful" (Alicia Keys and Jussie Smollett)
2016	Britney Spears	Glory	"Clumsy"
2016	Brooke Candy	Daddy Issues	"Happy Days"
2016	Ella Mai	Time	"She Don't" (featuring Ty Dolla Sign)
2016	Kelela	Hallucinogen	"All The Way Down"
2016	Jason Derulo	TBC	"If It Ain't Love"
2016	Dua Lipa	Dua Lipa	"Last Dance"
2016	Julian Perretta	Karma	"I Cry"
2016	Clams Casino	32 Levels	"A Breath Away" (featuring Kelela)
2016	Nathan Sykes	Unfinished Business	"Give It Up" (featuring G-Eazy)
2016	Nathan Sykes	Unfinished Business	"Twist"
2017	Chris Blue	TBA	"Money on You"
2017	Kelela	Take Me Apart	"Truth or Dare"
2017	Jorge Blanco	TBA	"Risky Business"
2017	Jorge Blanco	—N/a	"Summer Soul"
2017	Ella Mai	READY	"Anymore"
2017	Fitz and the Tantrums	TBA	"Fool"
2017	Wilkinson	Hypnotic	"Flatline"
2017	Chris Brown	Heartbreak on a Full Moon	"Rock Your Body"
2017	Adrian Marcel	GMFU	"BLIND"
2017	Khalid	American Teen	"Young Dumb & Broke"
2017	Common Kings	Lost In Paradise	"I Want Your Body"
2017	Isac Elliot	Faith	"She"
2017	H.E.R	H.E.R Vol 2	"Lights On"
2018	David Guetta, Martin Garrix & Brooks	7	"Like I Do"
2018	Pretty Much	TBA	"10,000 Hours"
2018	Ethan Young	TBA	"Giants"
2018	Craig David	The Time Is Now	"Talk to Me"
2018	Craig David	The Time Is Now	"Armour"
2018	Craig David	The Time Is Now	"Talk To Me Pt. 2" (featuring Ella Mai)
2018	Calum Scott	Only Human	"Only Human"
