= Karen Harding =

British musical artist (born 1991)

- Born: 18 November 1991 (age 34); Consett, Durham, England
- Genres: House; R&B; pop; 2-step garage
- Occupations: Singer; songwriter
- Instrument: Vocals
- Years active: 2010–present
- Labels: Method; Capitol; Ultra

Karen Harding (born 18 November 1991) is an English singer and songwriter from Consett, County Durham. Her first single, "Say Something", released in February 2015, entered the top 10 of the UK singles chart.

== Early life ==
Born to an English father and Filipino mother, Harding grew up in Consett and attended Moorside Community Technology College. She used to work at her parents' oriental food store and, in 2008, won a regional music competition called Music Means Life. One of her first recordings was a cover version of the anti-racism song "Strange Fruit", made famous by Billie Holiday.

She is a supporter of Newcastle United.

== Music career ==
In 2010, she competed on the television programme Eurovision: Your Country Needs You, the national final deciding who would represent the United Kingdom in that year's Eurovision Song Contest. She was eliminated in the penultimate round after singing Kylie Minogue's "What Do I Have to Do". Harding was a contestant on the tenth series of the television singing competition The X Factor, but was eliminated at the boot camp stage during the controversial six-chair challenge.

Following The X Factor, Harding was approached by the producer MNEK, who had seen a video she uploaded onto the Internet of her covering Disclosure's "Latch". She was subsequently signed by Disclosure's record label, Method Records. Her first single, the MNEK-produced "Say Something", was released in January 2015 by Method and Capitol Records and attracted notice from Fact magazine, MuuMuse, Noisey and The Singles Jukebox. "Say Something" entered the UK Singles Chart and peaked at number seven, with frequent airplay on BBC Radio 1 and its sister station, 1Xtra. It spent 26 weeks on the official charts and achieved platinum status.

Harding has worked with producers and songwriters such as Tom Aspaul, CocknBullKid, Mark J. Feist, Rodney Jerkins, Jimmy Napes and Richard Stannard. She is featured on the house duo Arches' single "New Love", released in April 2015, and on Blonde's single "Feel Good (It's Alright)", released in August 2015. Harding played at several festivals during mid-2015, including Birmingham Pride, Ibiza Rocks, Lovebox, Manchester Pride and Parklife.

Harding's influences include female solo artists such as Mariah Carey, Whitney Houston, Janet Jackson and Lisa Stansfield, as well as dance and garage acts Artful Dodger, Craig David and Madison Avenue. She has also cited house music of the 1990s as an influence.

In May 2016, Harding was selected to perform the English national anthem at the 2016 FA Cup Final. However, she missed her cue, and only managed to join in with the crowd for the last few lines.

"Need Your Love", a 2023 single she recorded with Felix Cartal, was the winner of the Juno Award for Dance Recording of the Year at the Juno Awards of 2024.

== Discography ==
=== Studio albums ===
Title	Details
Take Me Somewhere	Released: 29 September 2023; Label: Ultra Records; Formats: Digital download, CD, LP

=== Extended plays ===
Title	Details
Sweet Vibrations	Released: 15 October 2021; Label: Ultra Records; Formats: Digital download, streaming, CD

=== Singles ===
==== As lead artist ====
Title	Year	Peak chart positions					Certifications	Album
Title	Year	UK	BEL (Wa)	IRE	NZ Hot	SCO	Certifications	Album
"Say Something"	2014	7	80	73	—	11	BPI: 2× Platinum	Take Me Somewhere
"Open My Eyes"	2016	—	—	—	—	—		Non-album single
"Like I Can" (with Tough Love)	2016	—	—	—	—	—		Past Present Future
"Runaway" (with Tom Ferry)	2018	—	—	—	—	—		Non-album singles
"Picture"	2018	—	—	—	—	—		Non-album singles
"You Already Know" (with Paul Woolford)	2019	—	—	—	—	—		Non-album singles
"I Don't Need Love" (with Wh0)	2019	—	—	—	—	—		Non-album singles
"It Must Have Been Love"	2020	—	—	—	—	—		Non-album singles
"Rely" (with Future Kings & L'Tric)	2020	—	—	—	—	—		Sweet Vibrations EP
"Undo My Heart" (with Digital Farm Animals)	2020	—	—	—	—	—		Sweet Vibrations EP
"Let's Get Together" (with Illyus & Barrientos)	2020	—	—	—	—	—		Sweet Vibrations EP
"Morning" (with Shift K3Y)	2021	—	—	—	—	—		Sweet Vibrations EP
"The Best" (with Hook n Sling and Galantis)	2021	—	—	—	—	—		Non-album single
"Only One" (with Felix Cartal)	2021	—	—	—	—	—		Expensive Sounds for Nice People
"You & I (All I Need)"	2021	—	—	—	—	—		Sweet Vibrations EP
"Celebrate" (with Sammy Porter)	2021	—	—	—	—	—		Non-album singles
"White Horses" (with Toby Romeo and Noel Holler)	2022	—	—	—	—	—		Non-album singles
"Other Side of Love"	2022	—	—	—	—	—		Take Me Somewhere
"True" (with Jonasu)	2022	—	—	—	—	—		Non-album singles
"Last Christmas" (with Eden Prince)	2022	—	—	—	—	—		Non-album singles
"Wings (I Won't Let You Down)" (with Armand van Helden)	2022	—	—	—	—	—		Take Me Somewhere
"Sweat" (with Majestic)	2023	—	—	—	—	—		Non-album singles
"Oops" (with Oliver Heldens)	2023	—	—	—	—	—		Non-album singles
"Back to You"	2023	—	—	—	—	—		Take Me Somewhere
"Worship You" (with Martin Jensen)	2023	—	—	—	—	—		Non-album singles
"Show You" (with TS7)	2023	—	—	—	—	—		Non-album singles
"Need Your Love" (with Felix Cartal)	2023	—	—	—	—	—		Non-album singles
"Wrong Places"	2023	—	—	—	—	—		Take Me Somewhere
"Guardian Angel" (with Dimension)	2025	—	—	—	7	—		Non-album single
"—" denotes a recording that did not chart or was not released.

==== As featured artist ====
Title	Year	Peak chart positions		Certifications	Album
Title	Year	UK	IRE	Certifications	Album
"New Love" (Arches featuring Karen Harding)	2015	—	—		Non-album singles
"Feel Good (It's Alright)" (Blonde featuring Karen Harding)	2015	76	—		Non-album singles
"Sweet Lies" (Wilkinson featuring Karen Harding)	2016	—	—	BPI: Silver	Hypnotic
"Good for Me" (Giorgio Moroder featuring Karen Harding)	2016	—	—		Non-album single
"Gun Shy" (ImanoS featuring Pusha T & Karen Harding)	2017	—	—		xXx: Return of Xander Cage (Music from the Motion Picture)
"Down" (FooR featuring Karen Harding)	2017	—	—		Non-album singles
"The Weekend" (This Diamond Life featuring Karen Harding)	2017	—	—		Non-album singles
"More & More" (Tom Zanetti featuring Karen Harding)	2017	73	—		Non-album singles
"With U" (Official Untold Festival Anthem 2018) (Tujamo featuring Karen Harding)	2018	—	—		Non-album singles
"Stay" (Le Youth featuring Karen Harding)	2018	—	—		Non-album singles
"All for You" (Wilkinson featuring Karen Harding)	2019	—	—		Non-album singles
"Unity" (Röyksopp featuring Karen Harding)	2022	—	—		Profound Mysteries II
"Free to Love" (Louie Vega featuring Karen Harding)	2022	—	—		
"Bring Me Joy" (Rudimental featuring Karen Harding)	2024	63	—	BPI: Silver	Rudim3ntal
"In the Jungle" (Belters Only featuring Karen Harding)	2025	—	—		
"—" denotes a recording that did not chart or was not released.

=== Guest appearances ===
Title	Year	Artist	Album
"All U Need"	2018	Example	Bangers & Ballads

=== Songwriting credits ===
Year	Artist	Song	Album	Ref.
2015	The Magician	"Together"	Non-album single	
2016	Alex Newell	"Shame"	Power EP	
2016	Anton Powers	"Love You Better" feat. Sabella	Non-album single	
2018	Felix Jaehn	"Figure You Out"	I	
2018	Rika	"The Others"	Non-album single	
2018	Kokiri	"Pyramids"	Non-album single	
2018	BODE	"Side" feat. Natalie Wood	Non-album single	
2019	Claire Richards	"Shame on You"	My Wildest Dreams	
2019	Just Kiddin	"Stay the Night" with Camden Cox	Non-album single	
2019	Sonny Fodera	"Control" feat. Shannon Saunders	Rise	
2019	Sonny Fodera	"What is Love"	Rise	
2019	Kream	"Go Somewhere" with Rani	Non-album single	
2019	Vion Konger	"Her Bed" feat. Nikki Ambers	Non-album single	
2020	Tom Ferry	"I Think That I Like You" with Kiesza	Non-album single	
2020	Majestic	"Bodywork"	Non-album single	
2020	Crazy Cousinz	"Outline" feat. Julie Bergan	Non-album single	
2020	Just Kiddin	"Time Alone"	Non-album single	
2020	Eli Brown	"Immortal"	Non-album single	
2020	Alyx Ander	"Without You" with Mya	Non-album single	
2020	Paris Blohm	"Waiting" feat. Bright Lights	Non-album single	
2020	Henri PFR	"No One Knows" with Famba feat. Chiara Castelli	Non-album single	
2020	Kandy	"Free Me" with Bright Lights	Non-album single	
2021	Justus	"Meant to Be"	Non-album single	
2021	Marcus Santoro	"It's Not About You" with Isabelle Stern	Non-album single	
2021	Pablo Bravas	"Visions"	Non-album single	
2021	Tom Ferry	"Not Going Home" with Avian Haviv	Non-album single	
2021	Shane Codd	"Always on My Mind" feat. Charlotte Haining	Non-album single	
