= Back to You (Mollie King song) =

2016 single by Mollie King

Single by Mollie King
- Released: 19 August 2016
- Genre: Pop
- Length: 2:59
- Label: Island
- Songwriter(s): Mollie King; Ryan Ogren; Nick Bailey; Rob Persaud
- Producer(s): The Blueprint

Mollie King singles chronology
"Back to You" (2016)	"Hair Down" (2017)

"Back to You" is a song by English recording artist Mollie King. It was co-written by King alongside Rob Persaud and the production duo The Blueprint (Ryan Ogren and Nick Bailey), and was released as a digital download on 19 August 2016 by Island Records, followed by a remix EP a week later.

== Background and release ==
"Back to You" was King's debut solo single, following the hiatus of girl group The Saturdays. The music video was filmed by director Lisa Gunning.

"Back to You" debuted and peaked at number 90 on the UK Singles Chart, and at number 38 on the sales-only chart. It has sold over 15,000 copies in the UK to date. It reached the top 20 of the iTunes chart upon release, and in March 2021, returned to the iTunes top 40 following a campaign on the internet music forum BuzzJack for the site's 15th anniversary.

== Track listings ==
- Digital download
1. "Back to You" – 2:59
- Digital "Pt. 2" EP
1. "Back to You" (Acoustic) – 3:28
2. "Back to You" (LuvBug Remix) – 3:50
3. "Back to You" (Rooftop Boys Remix) – 3:44
4. "Back to You" (The Weekenders Remix) – 3:19

== Charts ==
=== Weekly charts ===
Chart (2016)	Peak position
UK Singles (OCC)	90
UK Singles Sales (OCC)	38
