= Afterglow (Wilkinson song) =

2013 Single by Wilkinson featuring Becky Hill

Single by Wilkinson featuring Becky Hill

from the album Lazers Not Included and Get to Know
- B-side: "Perforation"
- Released: 13 October 2013
- Genre: Drum and bass
- Length: 3:45
- Label: RAM; Virgin EMI
- Songwriters: Mark Wilkinson; Becky Hill; Bradford Ellis; Talay Riley
- Producers: Wilkinson; Brad Ellis (add.)

Wilkinson singles chronology
"Heartbeat" (2013)	"Afterglow" (2013)	"Too Close" (2014)

Becky Hill singles chronology
"Afterglow" (2013)	"Powerless" (2014)

Music video
- "Afterglow" on YouTube

"Afterglow" is a song by British record producer Wilkinson featuring Becky Hill. It was released on 13 October 2013, through RAM Records, as the fourth single from his debut album Lazers Not Included. It is also included on Hill's debut compilation album, Get to Know. It entered the UK Singles Chart at number 8 and topped the UK Dance Chart on 20 October 2013. Wilkinson and Hill performed the song as well as a cover of OneRepublic's "Counting Stars" in BBC Radio 1's Live Lounge on 17 October 2013. The song was certified as 3× platinum in the United Kingdom for over 1,800,000 equivalent sales.

== Music video ==
A music video to accompany the release of "Afterglow" was first released onto YouTube on 10 September 2013 at a total length of two minutes and fifty-two seconds. The video details a couple's five years of dating by tabulating the numbers, hours, days, and statistics of what they have done together since they first met. Australian actor, Leighton Sharpe, plays the role of Paul in the video and Danish model, Ida Marie, plays the role of Dana.

== Track listing ==
Digital download – single
No.	Title	Length
1.	"Afterglow"	3:45

Digital download – EP
No.	Title	Length
1.	"Afterglow" (Cyantific remix)	4:33
2.	"Afterglow" (DEVolution remix)	6:25
3.	"Afterglow" (Cutline remix)	4:48
4.	"Afterglow" (Dyro remix)	4:42
5.	"Afterglow" (radio edit)	2:52
6.	"Afterglow" (instrumental edit)	3:41

Digital download – Beatport edition
No.	Title	Length
1.	"Afterglow"	3:45
2.	"Perforation"	4:12
3.	"Afterglow" (DEVolution remix)	6:25
4.	"Afterglow" (Cyantific remix)	4:33
5.	"Afterglow" (Cutline remix)	4:48
6.	"Afterglow" (Dyro remix)	4:42

12" vinyl
No.	Title	Length
1.	"Afterglow"	3:45
2.	"Perforation"	4:12

== Credits and personnel ==
- Vocals, writer – Becky Hill
- Producer, programming – Mark Wilkinson
- Additional producer, piano – Brad Ellis
- Backing vocals, writer – Talay Riley
- Label – RAM Records, Virgin EMI Records

== Charts and certifications ==
=== Weekly charts ===
Chart (2013)	Peak position
Belgium (Ultratip Bubbling Under Flanders)	4
Czech Republic Airplay (ČNS IFPI)	17
Scotland Singles (Official Charts)	15
UK Dance (Official Charts)	1
UK Singles (Official Charts)	8

=== Year-end charts ===
Chart (2013)	Position
UK Singles (Official Charts Company)	110

=== Certifications ===
Region	Certification	Certified units/sales
New Zealand (RMNZ)	5× Platinum	150,000^{‡}
United Kingdom (BPI)	3× Platinum	1,800,000^{‡}
^{‡} Sales+streaming figures based on certification alone.

== Release history ==
Region	Date	Format	Label
Worldwide	13 October 2013	Digital download; 12" vinyl	RAM; Virgin EMI
