= Teebee =

Norwegian DJ and music producer

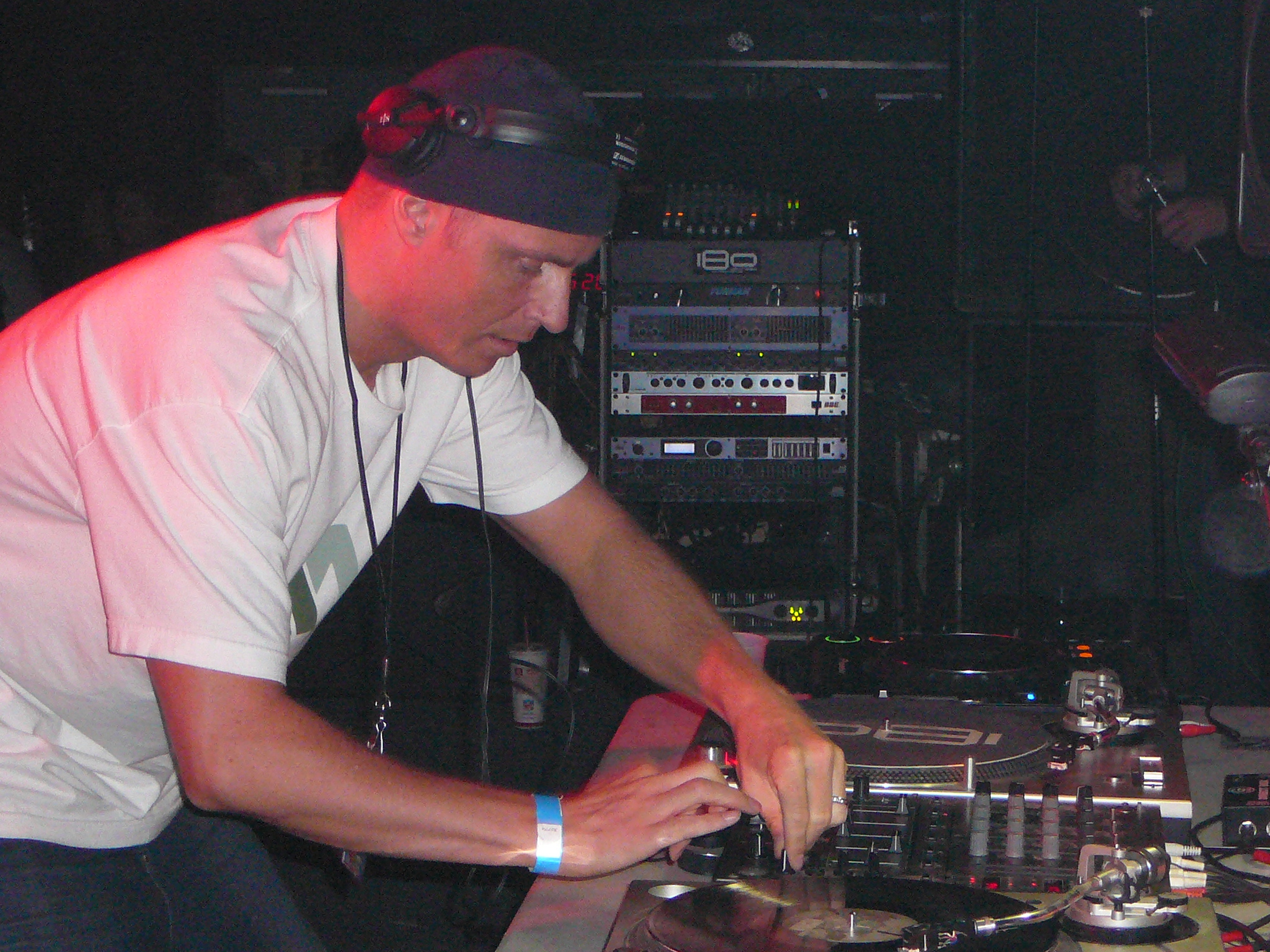
- Teebee in 2007

Background information
- Origin: Norway
- Genres: Drum and bass; neurofunk; techstep
- Years active: 1996–present
- Labels: RAM Records; Subtitles Recordings; Momentum; Certificate 18; Photek Productions

Torgeir Byrknes, better known by his stage name Teebee, is a Norwegian DJ and producer of drum and bass. He also runs the record label Subtitles Recordings. Teebee began DJing in 1990 and released his first record in 1996. He won the Knowledge Magazine award for Best International Producer in 2001.

== Musicology ==
Teebee's music is characterised by a strong dark and futuristic science fiction influence. TeeBee material could be classed as neurofunk or techstep, although possessing a deeper ambient and atmospheric quality than much of this subgenre. His early work in particular owes an acknowledged stylistic debt to Photek, and he was initially mostly associated with the Certificate 18 record label, alongside Photek, Klute and fellow Norwegian Polar. Following the folding of Cert 18 to enable the owner to release other genres of music, he, along with Polar, created the label Subtitles.

Teebee moved on to incorporate eclectic/experimental sounds into his music, mixing diverse samples into his tunes, such as China's Wong Fei Hung theme, "On the General's Orders".

In 2007, with long-time collaborator Calyx, Teebee released his first album "Anatomy" on the label "Momentum Music". Tracks from this album include "Telepathy" and "Warrior".

== Discography ==
=== Albums ===
- Black Science (with Polar as K) (1999)
- Black Science Labs (2000)
- Travel in Silence EP (2001)
- Through the Eyes of a Scorpion (2001)
- The Legacy (2004)
- Anatomy (with Calyx) (2007)
- All or Nothing (with Calyx) (2012)
- 1x1 (with Calyx) (2016)
- Plates (with Calyx) (2022)

=== DJ Mixes ===
- DJ TeeBee & K Present: The Deeper Side of Drum and Bass (2001)
- Carpe Diem (2006)
- Subliminal (2006)
- FabricLive.76 (2014)
