= Calyx (musician) =

British drum and bass act

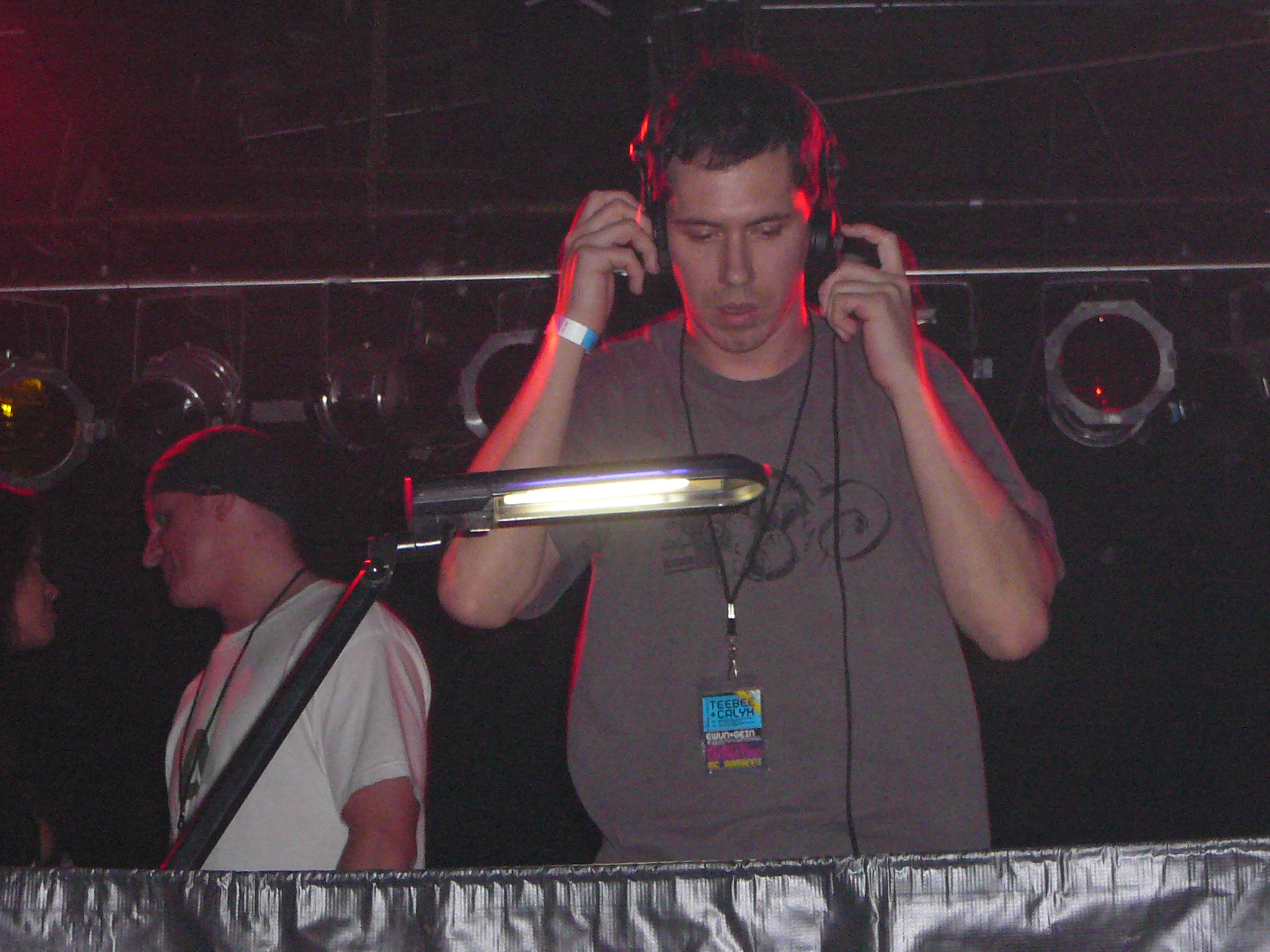
- Calyx in 2007

Background information
- Origin: UK
- Genres: Drum and bass, hardstep, techstep, neurofunk, darkstep
- Years active: 1998–present
- Labels: Moving Shadow; Metalheadz; Momentum Recordings; Subtitles Recordings; Ram Records (UK)
- Members: Larry Cons
- Past members: Chris Rush
- Website: Facebook; MySpace

Calyx is a British drum and bass act, specialising in the techstep and neurofunk styles. It was previously the duo of Larry Cons and Chris Rush (both of London), it is now a solo project of Larry Cons.

Their first release was in 1998 for Moving Shadow sublabel Audio Couture. Most of their releases have been for Moving Shadow, including the debut album No Turning Back (2005), with a few appearances for Metalheadz and Renegade Hardware. Many of Calyx hits has been featured in the video game Midnight Club 3. Track Quagmire is featured in Grand Theft Auto III.

In September 2007 he released an album called 'Anatomy', a joint project with fellow drum 'n' bass artist and long-term collaborator Teebee, under their own label Momentum Music. Calyx and Teebee went on to sign exclusively to Ram Records (UK) as a duo and would release collaborative albums 'All or Nothing' (2012), '1x1' (2016), and 'Plates' (2022).

As of 2023, Calyx is now signed on Critical Music, with 2022 seeing his first solo release in 16 years "Tempest / You Want It All" followed by "Pull Up / Feel The Sway" in 2023.

== Music career ==
London-based jungle/drum 'n' bass production team Calyx began as guitarist Larry Cons, who previously led a jazz-funk band called Octane, and former drummer Chris Rush. The two met at Oxford Brookes University before starting work together and launching their own recording studio in Streatham, South London.

Calyx debuted in February 1998 with "Cubic" / "Narcosis" released on Moving Shadow's sister label Audio Couture.

In 2000, after releasing the Catapult EP, Chris Rush decided to leave the duo to pursue a non-musical career, and since then Larry Cons continued Calyx as a solo project. Since that time Larry has released a number of tracks, including the Downpour EP, his debut on Metalheadz "Leviathan" / "Mindfold" and another EP for Moving Shadow, the Wasteground EP. He collaborated with Dom & Roland on the release "Pneumatix (Sledgehammer)" / "See The Light" He released his debut album No Turning Back on Moving Shadow.

== Discography ==
- Calyx – No Turning Back (2005)
1. Illusions (5:56)
2. Follow The Leader (feat. Teebee) (6:24)
3. Are You Ready? (Hive and Gridlok Remix) (5:30)
4. Dead Ringer (feat. Gridlok) (6:52)
5. Killa (Dom & Roland Remix) (6:53)
6. Tearing Us Apart (6:02)
7. Thru Your Eyes (feat. Ill.Skillz) (6:42)
8. Cyclone (feat. Teebee) (5:36)
9. Chasing Shadows (5:36)
10. Get Myself To You (7:32)
- Calyx & Teebee – Anatomy (2007)
1. The Divide (6:05)
2. Dual Processed (feat. MC Verse) (5:22)
3. Make Your Choice (5:21)
4. All That Remains (5:50)
5. Warrior (6:05)
6. Ultimatum (5:22)
7. Telepathy (6:06)
8. Enygma (7:06)
9. Confession (5:39)
10. Vortex (5:36)
- Calyx & Teebee – All or Nothing (2012)
1. Heroes & Villains (5:37)
2. Pure Gold (feat. Kemo) (5:34)
3. Skank (4:38)
4. We Become One (feat. Craze and Foreign Beggars) (5:03)
5. Elevate This Sound (5:20)
6. We Fall Away (4:30)
7. Scavenger (5:07)
8. Strung Out (3:29)
9. You'll Never Take Me Alive (feat. Beardyman) (4:16)
10. Starstruck (5:00)
11. Back & Forth (4:41)
12. Nothing I Can Say (5:26)
- Calyx & TeeBee – FabricLive.76 (2014)
- Calyx & Teebee – 1x1 (2016)
1. Nothing Left (4:57)
2. Long Gone (3:55)
3. Big Tune Again (4:49)
4. Cloud 9 (4:39)
5. False Alarm (3:48)
6. Ghetto Feat. Doctor (3:49)
7. Pathfinder (7:09)
8. Ghostwriter (4:20)
9. Takes One To Know One (3:38)
10. Were We Go Feat. Doctor (4:22)
11. The Fall Feat. Ayah Marar (4:28)
12. Panic Attack (4:54)
13. Stray Bullet (5:14)
14. A Day That Never Comes (4:09)

== Song usage ==
Tracks "Follow the Leader", "Thru Your Eyes", "Get Myself to You", "Chasing Shadows", "Illusions", "Collision Course", "Are You Ready" and "Just You" are used in the popular racing game, Midnight Club 3: DUB Edition.

"Quagmire" is featured in Grand Theft Auto III.
