= 3 Beat Records =

British record label

3 Beat Productions
- Founded: 1989
- Founder: Jon Barlow
- Distributor: Universal Music
- Genre: EDM
- Country of origin: United Kingdom
- Location: Liverpool, England
- Official website: 3beat.co.uk

3 Beat Productions is a British independent record label founded by Jon Barlow in 1989.

== History ==
3 Beat Music was founded as a dance music record shop in 1989 by Jon Barlow, Dave Nicholl, Phil Southall and later joined by Phil Beddard and Hywell Williams who were students at the time. It began as a second hand record stall in Quiggins, Liverpool and later moved into a permanent location on Wood Street where the shop was managed by Rob Jay and Pezz 3 Beat where it won numerous awards including Music Week's independent record shop of the year. In 2002, the shop expanded and moved to Slater Street. As of 2009, the record shop has changed ownership and is now no longer part of the 3 Beat group. The new owners [who were ex employees of 3 Beat] wanted to keep a connection to the history of the shop whilst also showing things had moved on so changed the name to 3B Records.

In 1991 Barlow, Nichol and Southall started the independent record label 3 Beat Music which released records by artists such as D:Fuse, New Atlantic, Pianoman and Powerhouse. In 2000 Jon Barlow, Pezz 3 Beat and Andy Jarrod set up the 3 Beat Label Management company which offered distribution services to numerous independent record labels. The most notable of these was James Holden's 'Border Community' imprint that bucked the trend of declining vinyl sales by consistently selling in excess of 20,000 units of its 12" single releases. 3 Beat Label Management closed in 2007 after Amato Distribution's collapse left them with an unmanageable debt

In 2003 Jon Barlow and Pezz along with A&R executive Anton Powers and label manager Tim Condran set up Boss Records, with distribution from Ministry of Sound. Over the next four years the label released numerous singles with hit records by artists such as Angel City, Aaron Smith, Mason versus Princess Superstar and Studio B. In 2007, after Boss Records' contract had expired with Ministry of Sound, Barlow and Pezz founded 3 Beat Productions with distribution from Universal. The new label was made up of two sub-labels 3 Beat Blue and 3 Beat Red and has released records by artists such as Agnes, Cahill, Ian Carey, Duck Sauce and Skepta.

In 2011, the label achieved its first UK No. 1 single with "Loca People" by Sak Noel.

In the 2020s, artists who have released records via 3 Beat include Liverpool singer-songwriter Jetta and producer Jonasu, who reached the Top 3 in 2021 with his song "Black Magic".

== Labels and subsidiaries ==
- 3 Beat Music
- Glow Records
- Forward Records
- 3Three Records
- 3 Beat Breaks
- Boss Records
- Lab Records
- 3 Beat Blue Records
- 3 Beat Red Records

== Artists ==
- Agnes
- Alexandra Stan
- Alyssa Reid
- Angel City
- Anton Powers
- Basshunter
- Cahill
- Callum Beattie
- Cher Lloyd
- Cheryl
- D Fuse
- Dawood & Knight
- Duck Sauce
- Edward Maya
- Erick Morillo
- Fuse ODG
- Geko
- High Contrast
- Ian Carey
- Inna
- Jetta
- Jonasu
- Liz McClarnon
- Luke Bingham
- M-22
- Martin Solveig
- Mike Di Scala
- New Atlantic
- Ola Svensson
- P-Money
- Philip George
- Pianoman
- Powerhouse
- Sak Noel
- Sigma
- Skepta
- Skyla
- Steve Mac
- Stylo G
- Sway

== Releases ==
=== Albums ===
- High Contrast – Notes from the Underground (2020)
- Callum Beattie – People Like Us (2020)
- High Contrast – Night Gallery (2017)
- TC – Unleash the Wolves (2016)
- Kungs – Layers (2016)
- Sigma – Life (2015)
- Skepta – Doin' It Again (3 Beat Productions, 2011) #19
- Inna – Hot (3 Beat Productions, 2011) #32
- Angel City – Love Me Right #44 (Boss Records, 2005)

=== Singles ===
- Aaron Smith feat. Luvli – Dancin' (Boss Records, 2005) #20
- Afrojack & Steve Aoki feat. Miss Palmer – No Beef (3 Beat, 2011) #25
- Agnes – I Need You Now (3 Beat Blue, 2009) #40
- Agnes – Release Me (3 Beat Blue, 2009) #3
- Alexandra Stan – Lemonade (3 Beat Productions, 2012)
- Alexandra Stan – "Mr. Saxobeat" (3 Beat Productions, 2011) #3
- Alyssa Reid – "Alone Again" (3 Beat Productions, 2012) #2
- Angel City – "Do You Know (I Go Crazy)" #8 (Boss Records, 2004)
- Angel City – "Love Me Right (Oh Sheila)" #11 (Boss Records, 2003)
- Angel City – "Sunrise" #9 (Boss Records, 2004)
- Angel City – "Touch Me (All Night Long)" #18 (Boss Records, 2004)
- Basshunter – "Northern Light" (3Beat Productions, 2012)
- Berri – "Shine Like a Star" (3 Beat Music, 1995) #20
- Berri – "Sunshine After the Rain" (3 Beat Music, 1995) #4
- Cahill ft. TY – Take It Back (3 Beat Productions, 2012)
- Cahill feat. Nikki Belle – "Trippin' On You" (3 Beat Blue, 2008) #25
- Cedric Gervais – "Molly" (3 Beat Productions, 2012) #26
- Cher Lloyd – M.I.A (3 Beat Music, 2019)
- Cheryl – "Love Made Me Do It" (3 Beat Productions, 2018) #19
- The Lisa Marie Experience – "Do That to Me" (3 Beat Music, 1996) #33
- The Lisa Marie Experience – "Keep on Jumpin'" (3 Beat Music, 1996) #7
- Duck Sauce – "Barbra Streisand" (3 Beat Productions, 2010) #3
- Edward Maya feat. Vika Jigulina – "Stereo Love" (3 Beat Productions, 2010) #4
- The Ian Carey Project – "Get Shaky" (3 Beat Productions, 2009) #9
- Inna – "Amazing" (3 Beat Productions, 2009) #14
- Inna – "Hot" (3 Beat Productions, 2010) #6
- Inna – "Sun Is Up" (3 Beat Productions, 2011) #15
- Jetta – "He Usually Likes Boys" (3 Beat Productions, 2021)
- Jetta – "Honey" (3 Beat Productions, 2020)
- Jetta – "Livin'" (3 Beat Productions, 2020)
- Jetta – "No Fire" (3 Beat Productions, 2019)
- Luke Bingham ft. Sway – Gemini (3 Beat Productions, 2012)
- Luke Bingham – Shut It Down (3 Beat Productions, 2012)
- Martin Solveig & Dragonette – "Hello" (3 Beat Productions, 2010) #13
- Martin Solveig – "The Night Out" (3 Beat Productions, 2012) #36
- Mason vs. Princess Superstar – "Perfect (Exceeder)" (Boss Records, 2007) #3
- Matrix & Futurebound feat. Luke Bingham – "All I Know" (3 Beat Productions, 2012) #29
- Pianoman – "Blurred" (3 Beat Music, 1996) #6
- Powerhouse – "Rhythm of the Night" (3 Beat Music, 1997) #38
- Sak Noel – "Loca People" (3 Beat Productions, 2011) #1
- Sigma – "Nobody to Love" (3 Beat Productions, 2014) #1
- Sigma feat. Paloma Faith – "Changing" (3 Beat Productions, 2014) #1
- Skepta feat. Preeya Kalidas – "Cross My Heart" (3 Beat Productions, 2010) #31
- Skepta – "Hold On" (3 Beat Productions, 2012) #30
- Skepta – "Make Peace Not War" (3 Beat Productions, 2012) #29
- Skepta – "Rescue Me" (3 Beat Productions, 2010) #14
- Steve Mac – "Paddy's Revenge" (3 Beat Blue, 2008) #17
- Studio B – "I See Girls" (Boss Records, 2005) #12
- Stylo G – Soundbwoy #18 (3 Beat Productions, 2013)
- Sway – "Level Up" (3 Beat Productions, 2012) #8
- Sway – "Still Speedin'" (3 Beat Productions, 2011) #19
- Unicorn Kid – Need U (3 Beat Productions, 2012)

=== Top 100 singles ===
- Pianoman – "Party People (Live Your Life Be Free)" (3 Beat Music, 1997) #43
- Bingo Players – "Cry (Just a Little)" (3 Beat Productions, 2011) #44
- CLS – "Can You Feel It" (3 Beat Music, 1998) #46
- Martin Solveig feat. Kele – "Ready 2 Go" (3 Beat Productions, 2011) #48
- Marco Demark feat. Casey Barnes – "Tiny Dancer" (3 Beat Blue, 2008) #54
- Alexandra Stan – "Get Back (ASAP)" (3 Beat Productions, 2011) #56
- Isha-D – "Stay" (3 Beat Music, 1997) #58
- Inna – "Déjà Vu" (3 Beat Productions, 2010) #60
- Onyx feat. Gemma J – "Every Little Time" (Boss Records, 2004) #66
- New Atlantic vs. Quake – "I Know '99" (3 Beat Music, 1999) #79
- Duck Sauce – "Big Bad Wolf" (3 Beat Productions, 2011) #79
- Erick Morillo & Eddie Thoneick – "Stronger" (3 Beat Productions, 2011) #80
- Agnes – "On & On" (3 Beat Blue, 2010) #82
- Chakra – "I Am" (Boss Records, 2004) #97
- Skepta vs. N-Dubz – "So Alive" (3 Beat Productions, 2011) #99
- The Space Brothers – "One More Chance" (Boss Records, 2003) #100

== See also ==
- List of record labels: 0–9
