= Skyla =

English singer (born 1991)

- Born: Lucy A. Batty; 5 March 1991 (age 35)
- Origin: Altrincham, England
- Genres: Dance, house, electronic
- Occupation: Singer
- Years active: 2008–present
- Labels: 3 Beat, All Around the World, Nine Planet Records

Skyla (born Lucy A. Batty, 5 March 1991) is an English dance singer from Altrincham.

== Career ==
Skyla was signed by 3 Beat/AATW in 2008. She was working alongside producers Scott Rosser (from Cahill), Mike Di Scala (Ultrabeat) and Nemesis.

Her appearance on the music scene was a song by the Beatplayers on a titled track "Summer Love" and she featured on the track as well as in the music video. The song peaked at 31 on the UK Dance Chart. On 9 June 2009, she released her debut single, "Breaking Free" (a cover of the High School Musical song). On 14 October 2009, she released her second single, a cover of 50 Cent's "Ayo Technology". It received heavy airplay on many channels such as Clubland TV, MTV Dance and Chart Show TV, and was very popular in clubs and bars all across Europe; it peaked at 34 on the UK Dance Chart.

On 3 September 2010, Skyla premiered a new song on YouTube called "Lady Killer" featuring grime artist Bashy. It peaked on the UK Independent Chart.

In 2011, Skyla signed with independent record label Nine Planet Records. Her music video "Disco Drum" was released on YouTube in January 2012. Near the end of October 2012, Skyla and Nine Planet Records released five new songs.

In total, all of Skyla's music videos have accumulated over five million views on YouTube.

== Discography ==
=== Singles ===
Year	Single	Peak chart positions		
Year	Single	UK	UK Dance	UK Indie
2008	"Summer Love"	158	29	—
2009	"Breaking Free"	181	36	—
2009	"Ayo Technology"	—	40	—
2010	"Lady Killer" (featuring Bashy)	—	—	25
2012	"Disco Drum"	—	—	—
2012	"Loverboy" (featuring The Sax Man)	—	—	—
2012	"Stereo Drum"	—	—	—
2012	"Sexy Trumpet"	—	—	—
2012	"Crazy Little Thing"	—	—	—
2012	"Crazy Little Thing (Front Runners Remix)"	—	—	—
2013	"I Don't Wanna Go"	—	—	—
