= MOBO Awards 2025 =

UK awards for black musicians

- Awarded for: Excellence in music of black origin
- Sponsored by: Newcastle City Council; BBC; got2b; Marshall; LNER; Loco Music Company
- Date: 18 February 2025
- Location: Utilita Arena, Newcastle, England
- Country: United Kingdom
- Hosted by: Eddie Kadi and Indiyah Polack

Highlights
- Most wins: Ayra Starr, Bashy, Darkoo and Deal (2 each)
- Most nominations: Bashy, Central Cee, Cleo Sol, Ghetts, Jorja Smith, Odeal and Sampha (3 each)
- Album of the Year: Bashy – Being Poor Is Expensive
- Website: mobo.com

Television/radio coverage
- Network: YouTube; BBC One

The MOBO Awards 2025 was the 27th edition of the MOBO Awards. It took place on 18 February 2025, at the Utilita Arena in Newcastle, England. It honoured achievements in music of black origin. Live streamed on YouTube, it is sponsored by Newcastle City Council, BBC, got2b, Marshall, LNER and Loco Music Company. Hosts for the ceremony are Eddie Kadi and Indiyah Polack.

The nominations were announced on 4 December 2024, with Jorja Smith, Sampha, Bashy, Ghetts, Cleo Sol, Central Cee and Odeal leading with three nominations apiece.

== Winners and nominees ==
Below is the list of nominees. Winners are listed first and highlighted in bold.

Winners and nominees
**Best Newcomer**: **Odeal**; Chy Cartier; Elmiene; Fimiguerrero; Flowerovlove; Jordan Adetunji; Len; Leostaytrill; Myles Smith; Pozer	**Song of the Year**: **Darkoo feat. Dess Dior – "Favourite Girl"**; Central Cee feat. Lil Baby – "Band4Band"; Chase & Status and Stormzy – "Backbone"; Jordan Adetunji – "Kehlani"; Leostaytrill – "Pink Lemonade"; Odeal – "Soh-soh"
**Video of the Year**: **Mnelia – "My Man" (Directed By Femi Bello)**; Meekz – "Mini Me’s" (Directed By Kc Locke); Raye – "Genesis" (Directed By Otis Dominique and Raye); Sampha – "Only" (Directed By Dexter Navy); Skepta – "Gas Me Up (Diligent)" (Directed By Steveo); Unknown T feat. Loyle Carner – "Hocus Pocus" (Directed By Felix Brady)	**Best African Music Act**: **Ayra Starr (Nigeria)**; Asake (Nigeria); Bnxn & Ruger (Nigeria); King Promise (Ghana); Odumodublvck (Nigeria); Rema (Nigeria); Shallipopi (Nigeria); Tems (Nigeria); Tyla (South Africa); Uncle Waffles (South Africa)
**Best International Act**: **Ayra Starr**; Asake; Beyoncé; GloRilla; Kendrick Lamar; Latto; Megan Thee Stallion; Nicki Minaj; Tems; Tyla	**Best Media Personality**: **90's Baby Show**; AJ Odudu; Chuckie Online; Craig Mitch; Henrie Kwushue; Madame Joyce; Micah Richards; Specs Gonzalez; The Receipts Podcast; Zeze Millz
**Best Performance in a TV Show/Film**: **Jacob Anderson as Louis In Interview with the Vampire**; Angela Wynter as Yolande Trueman In EastEnders; Caroline Chikezie as Noma In Power Book II: Ghost; Diane Parish as Denise Fox In EastEnders; Dionne Brown as Queenie In Queenie; Ghetts as Krazy In Supacell; Jasmine Jobson as Jaq In Top Boy; Josh Tedeku as Tazer In Supacell; Kingsley Ben-adir as Bob Marley In Bob Marley: One Love; Tosin Cole as Michael In Supacell	**Best Male Act**: **Central Cee**; Bashy; D-Block Europe; Ghetts; Nemzzz; Sampha
**Best Female Act**: **Darkoo**; Cleo Sol; Jorja Smith; Little Simz; Nia Archives; Raye	**Album of the Year**: **Bashy – Being Poor Is Expensive**; Cleo Sol – Gold; Ghetts – On Purpose, With Purpose; Jorja Smith – Falling or Flying; Sampha – Lahai; Skrapz – Reflection
**Best Hip-hop Act**: **Bashy**; Cristale; Headie One; Nines; Potter Payper; Skrapz	**Best R&B/Soul Act**: **Odeal**; Cleo Sol; Elmiene; Flo; Jaz Karis; Jorja Smith; Nippa; Sasha Keable; Shae Universe; Sinead Harnett
**Best Drill Act**: **Pozer**; 163Margs; Central Cee; Headie One; Kairo Keyz; K-Trap	**Best Grime Act**: **Scorcher**; Chip; D Double E; Duppy; Kruz Leone; Manga Saint Hilare
**Best Alternative Music Act**: **ALT BLK ERA**; Bob Vylan; Hak Baker; Kid Bookie; Native James; Spider	**Best Caribbean Music Act**: **Shenseea**; Popcaan; Skillibeng; Spice; Valiant; YG Marley
**Best Electronic/Dance Music Act**: **TSHA**; Eliza Rose; Nia Archives; Pinkpantheress; Salute; Shygirl	**Best Jazz Act**: **Ezra Collective**; Amy Gadiaga; Blue Lab Beats; Ego Ella May; Kokoroko; Yussef Dayes
**Best Gospel Act**: **Annatoria**; Imrhan; Limoblaze; Reblah; Still Shadey; Volney Morgan & New Ye	**Best Producer**: **Juls**; Ceebeaats; Inflo; M1onthebeat; P2J; Sammy Soso

=== Special awards ===
- Vybz Kartel (Impact Award)
- Denise Lewis (Paving The Way Award):
