= Shimmy (disambiguation) =

A shimmy is a dance move, a kind of shaking of shoulders.

Shimmy may also refer to:

- Shimmy (TV series), a belly dance instructional television series
- Speed wobble, an oscillating instability in vehicle steering wheels
- Shimmy, a common nickname for the Hebrew name Shimon

== Music ==
- Shimmy Disc, record label founded in 1987 by Mark Kramer
- "Shimmy" (song), covered by Preeya Kalidas and Mumzy Stranger
- "Shimmy", a song by System of a Down from the album Toxicity
- "Shimmy", a song by Bruce Morrow L. Hampton, B. Morrow, 1962
- "Shimmy", a song by Lee Allen And Band, 1956
- "Shimmy", a song by Toussaint McCall, 1972
- "Shimmy", a song by Aminé, 2020
- "Shimmy", a song by K.O from the album "Pty Unld", 2019
- "Shimmy", a song by Lil Wayne featuring Doja Cat from the album Funeral
- "Shimmy Shimmy Ya", a 1995 song by Ol' Dirty Bastard

== People ==
- Shimmy Marcus (born 1966), Irish filmmaker
