= Salamander Street =

Single by Callum Beattie

from the album People Like Us
- Released: 26 June 2020
- Length: 3:16
- Label: 3 Beat Records
- Songwriters: Callum Beattie; David Jürgens; Al James Peden
- Producer: David Jürgens

Callum Beattie singles chronology
"Some Heroes Don't Wear Capes" (2020)	"Salamander Street" (2020)	"Fuckers" (2020)

"Salamander Street" is a song performed by Scottish singer-songwriter Callum Beattie. The song was released as a digital download on 26 June 2020 as the seventh single from his debut studio album People Like Us. The song peaked at number six on the Scottish Singles Charts.

== Background ==
In early 2020, Beattie was interviewed by Robin Galloway on Pure Radio about his new album and chose for them to play "Some Heroes Don't Wear Capes" in a tribute to NHS workers. The station started playing three of his songs including Salamander Street.

Later that year, in an interview with Boogie and Arlene on Forth 1, he thanked the radio station for their support of the song, he said, "I wake up every day to 200 messages and it's thanks to you guys, I know you think I have to say that, but genuinely I really appreciate your support." When he was asked about the reasons for writing a song about an area that's known for a certain type of nightlife, Beattie said, "It's a song about growing up in Edinburgh, and you know, I went to school with someone who I later saw in Salamander Street, and I just thought, it's a story that's real, and I wanted to write about it." He also said that he wrote the song in a cupboard in his mum's kitchen when he was just 18-years-old.

== Music video ==
A music video to accompany the release of "Salamander Street" was first released onto YouTube on 26 June 2020. The video is about a former classmate who became a prostitute in Edinburgh.

== Track listing ==
Digital download
No.	Title	Length
1.	"Salamander Street"	3:16

== Personnel ==
Credits adapted from Tidal.

- David Jürgens – producer, composer, lyricist
- Al James Peden – composer, lyricist
- Callum Beattie – composer, lyricist, associated performer, background vocalist, guitar, vocals
- Joe LaPorta – mastering engineer, studio personnel

== Charts ==
Chart (2020)	Peak position
Scotland Singles (OCC)	6
UK Singles Downloads (OCC)	49

== Release history ==
Region	Date	Format	Label
United Kingdom	26 June 2020	Digital download	3 Beat Records
