= Amnesia (Skepta song) =

Single by Skepta and Boy Better Know

from the album Doin' It Again
- Released: 27 February 2011
- Recorded: 2010
- Genre: Electro-grime, dance
- Length: 3:55 (album version)
- Label: 3 Beat; All Around the World
- Songwriter(s): J. Adenuga
- Producer(s): BassBoy

Skepta singles chronology
"So Alive" (2011)	"Amnesia" (2011)	"Hold On" (2012)

"Amnesia" is a song by British MC Skepta. It was released on 27 February 2011 in the United Kingdom. It is the fifth single released Skepta's third album Doin' It Again. It reached number 164 on the UK Singles Chart.

== Background ==
The track was premiered on Westwood's Radio 1 show on 22 January 2011. It was released a Digital download on 27 February 2011.

== Track listings ==
Digital download
No.	Title	Length
1.	"Amnesia" (Liam Keegan Radio Edit)	4:04
2.	"Amnesia" (Liam Keegan Mix)	6:22
3.	"Amnesia" (J Sparrow Mix)	5:03
4.	"Amnesia" (Heavy Feet Mix)	5:18
5.	"Amnesia" (Heavy Feet Dub Mix)	5:19
6.	"Amnesia" (Artificial Intelligence Vocal Mix)	5:35
7.	"Amnesia" (Artificial Intelligence Dub Mix)	5:35
8.	"Amnesia" (Radio Edit)	3:05

== Music video ==
The music video for "Amnesia" premiered on 22 January 2010 on YouTube. The video currently has over 3,600,000 views.

== Personnel ==
- Lead vocals – Skepta
- Producers – Bassboy
- Lyrics – J. Adenuga
- Label: All Around the World

== Chart performance ==
=== Weekly charts ===
Chart (2011)	Peak position
UK Singles (The Official Charts Company)	164

== Release history ==
Region	Date	Format	Label
United Kingdom	27 February 2011	Digital download	3 Beat, All Around the World
