= Cross My Heart (Skepta song) =

Single by Skepta featuring Preeya Kalidas

from the album Doin' It Again & I'm Over It
- Released: 17 October 2010
- Recorded: 2010
- Genre: Hip hop; grime
- Length: 2:53
- Label: 3 Beat, All Around the World
- Songwriter(s): J. Adenuga
- Producer(s): J. Adenuga

Skepta singles chronology
"Rescue Me" (2010)	"Cross My Heart" (2010)	"So Alive" (2011)

Preeya Kalidas singles chronology
"Fantasy" (2010)	"Cross My Heart" (2010)	"It's A Problem" (2011)

"Cross My Heart" is a song by British MC Skepta, featuring vocals from actress and singer Preeya Kalidas. The song was released as a digital download on 17 October 2010 in the United Kingdom. It is the third single to be released from Skepta's third studio album, Doin' It Again (2011). The single will also feature on Kalidas' upcoming debut album, I'm Over It. On 24 October 2010 the song entered the UK Singles Chart at number 31 becoming Skepta's fourth highest-charted single, after "Rescue Me", That's Not Me and "Bad Boy".

== Track listings ==
No.	Title	Length
1.	"Cross My Heart" (Radio Edit)	2:53
2.	"Cross My Heart" (Instrumental Mix)	2:53
3.	"Cross My Heart" (DJ Fresh Club Mix)	3:45
4.	"Cross My Heart" (DJ Fresh Raw Mix)	2:58
5.	"Cross My Heart" (Matrix & Futurebund)	4:11
6.	"Cross My Heart" (Rishi Rich Desi Mix)	3:29

== Chart performance ==
=== Weekly charts ===
Chart (2010)	Peak position
European Hot 100	89
UK Singles (OCC)	31
UK Hip Hop/R&B (OCC)	8
UK Singles Downloads (OCC)	31

== Release history ==
Region	Date	Format	Label	Catalogue
United Kingdom	17 October 2010	Digital download, CD single	3 Beat, All Around the World	B0044WWLNO
