= Cahill (group) =

House music group from Liverpool

- Also known as: Beatplayers
- Origin: Liverpool / Cheshire
- Genres: House, funky house, electro house
- Years active: 2007–present
- Labels: 3 Beat, AATW
- Members: Anton Powers; Tim Condran; Scott Rosser
- Website: Cahill Facebook; Cahill Twitter; Cahill Soundcloud

Cahill /ˈkeɪhɪl/ are a dance music group based in Liverpool, UK, consisting of producers Anton Powers, Tim Condran and Scott Rosser. They are best known for their 2008 single, "Trippin' on You", which features vocals from Nikki Belle.

== Background ==
Cahill are named after Tim Cahill, the star midfielder for Everton F.C., the team Anton Powers supports. The three producers and Nikki Belle recorded the song "Trippin' On You" in 2007, and the song became popular in Liverpool's nightclubs, before it appeared on the Clubland 13 compilation album. The song went to promo on Anton Powers and Tim Condran's record label, 3 Beat Blue (formerly Boss Records).

A music video was made in February 2007 ready for the song's full single release on 3 Beat Blue/All Around the World. "Trippin' On You" was playlisted by Radio 1, Galaxy and MTV Dance. The song was adopted as a signature track for WAGs – Abbey Clancy, Alex Curran, Coleen Rooney and Elen Rives.

== Band members ==
Scott Rosser
Scott Rosser is a producer from Cheshire, who has sold 4 million records worldwide with Dario G. He now runs a recording studio in Cheshire and does remixes with Daz Bailey as 'Bailey & Rossko'.

Anton Powers
Anton Powers is a DJ/producer from Liverpool. He is well known for performing DJ sets in Liverpool and North West England. Also runs Liverpool-based record labels 3 Beat Blue and 3 Beat Red. In addition, he had his own radio show on Radio City 96.7, Juice FM, Capital FM and Kiss.

Tim Condran
Tim Condran is a DJ and producer from Crosby. He also runs 3 Beat Blue and 3 Beat Red with Anton Powers as well as DJing as Cahill.

== Discography ==
=== Singles ===
- 2008 – "Trippin' on You" ft. Nikki Belle (Reached No. 25 on the UK singles chart)
- 2009 – "Into My Life"
- 2009 – "Sex Shooter" ft. Nikki Belle
- 2010 – "Crush on You" ft. Nikki Belle
- 2011 – "In Case I Fall" ft. Joel Edwards
- 2012 – "Can't You See" ft. Chrom3
- 2012 – "Take It Back" ft. TY
- 2013 – "Feel the Love" ft. Kimberley Locke
- 2014 – "Sunshine"
- 2020 – "Only You" ft. Craig Smart
- 2021 – "Look What You've Done" with Tia Kofi

=== Remixes ===
==== A ====
- Agnes – "Release Me", "I Need You Now", "On and On", "Big Blue Wall"
- Agnetha Fältskog – "Dance Your Pain Away"
- (2009) Alcazar – "Burning"
- Alesha Dixon – "Breathe Slow"
- (2011) Alexandra Burke – "All Night Long"
- (2012) Alexandra Stan – "Lemonade"
- Alexis Jordan – "Hush Hush"
- Alina – "When You Leave (Numa Numa)"
- Allie X – "All the Rage"
- Ana Shine – "Waiting List"
- Anne-Marie – "Alarm"
- Anthoney Wright – "Wud If I Cud"
- Arash feat. T-Pain – "Sex Love Rock N Roll (SLR)"
- Ashley Roberts – "Clockwork"
- Astrid S – "Think Before I Talk"
- Audio Playground feat. Snoop Lion – "You Never Know (Could You Be Loved)"
- Ayala – "On My Way"

==== B ====
- Ben Montague – "Love Like Stars"
- The Black Eyed Peas – "Boom Boom Pow"
- BWO – "Right Here Right Now"

==== C ====
- Carrie Mac – "Till I See You Again"
- Cascada – "Evacuate the Dancefloor", "Dangerous", "Pyromania", "San Francisco"
- Charli XCX – "Boom Clap"
- Charlie Puth featuring Meghan Trainor – "Marvin Gaye"
- Cher Lloyd – "Want U Back", "M.I.A"
- (2014) Cheryl – "Fight For This Love", "I Don't Care", "Let You"
- (2012) Chris Brown – "Forever"
- Circuit21 – "Love In The Shadows"
- Clean Bandit featuring Stylo G – "Come Over"
- Clean Bandit featuring Julia Michaels – "I Miss You"

==== D ====
- Daley – "Broken"
- Dawood & Knight feat. Jodie Connor – "Love Of My Life"
- Demi Lovato – "Cool for the Summer"
- Denis The Menace & Big World – "Fired Up"
- DJ Fresh feat. Ellie Goulding – "Flashlight"
- Dot Rotten – "Overload"
- Drop City Yacht Club feat. Jeremih – "Crickets"

==== E ====
- Ed Drewett – "Undefeated"
- Ellie Goulding – "Beating Heart"
- Elton John vs Pnau – "Good Morning To The Night"
- Enrique Iglesias – "I Like It"
- Esmée Denters – "It's Summer (Because We Say So)"

==== F ====
- Far East Movement featuring The Cataracs & Dev – "Like a G6"
- Far East Movement featuring Snoop Dogg – "If I Was You (OMG)"
- Ferreck Dawn & Redondo – "Love Too Deep"
- Florrie – "Real Love"
- Foxes – "Amazing"
- Fragma – "Memory"
- Fuse ODG feat. Tiffany – "Azonto"

==== G ====
- Gabriella Cilmi – "Defender"
- Gabry Ponte featuring Zhana – "Skyride"
- Gali – "I'm Alive"
- Gloria Estefan – "Medicine"
- Gungor – "I Forgive You"

==== H ====
- Hannah – "I Believe In You"

==== I ====
- Inna – "Hot", "Sun Is Up", "Endless"
- IV Rox feat. Majestic – "I Heard Love"
- IV Rox feat. Sneakbo – "Pumping (Out Of My Speakers)"
- Iyaz – "Solo"

==== J ====
- Jade Ewen – "My Man"
- JKAY feat. Shola Ama – "Danger"
- JLS – "Everybody In Love"
- Joe McElderry – "Ambitions"
- Joe and Jake – "You're Not Alone
- Jess Glynne – "I'll Be There"

==== K ====
- Kaci Battaglia – "Crazy Possessive"
- Kady Z – "Crush Gone Wrong"
- Kamaliya – "Rising Up", "Love Me Like"
- Kendra Erika – "Thriller Killer"
- Keri Hilson – "Pretty Girl Rock"
- Karl Wolf – "Go Your Own Way"
- Kevin Rudolf featuring Lil Wayne – "Let It Rock"
- K.I.G. – "Head, Shoulders, Kneez & Toez"

==== L ====
- Lady Gaga – "The Edge of Glory"
- Laura LaRue – "Un Deux Trois"
- (2012) Lawson – "Standing In The Dark", "Juliet"
- LeAnn Rimes – "Give", "How Do I Live"
- LeeLee – "Looks Good On You"
- Lemar – "The Way Love Goes"
- Leona Lewis and Avicii – "Collide"
- Leona Lewis – "Collide", "One More Sleep"
- Lina – "Can't Keep Falling"
- LION BABE – "Impossible"
- Lisa Stansfield – "So Be It"
- Little Mix – "Black Magic"
- Lloyd featuring Lil Wayne – "Girls Around the World"
- LYRA – "29 Box"
- LZ7 – "Forever Young", "Last Night"

==== M ====
- Mariah Carey – "Obsessed"
- Maroon 5 – "Sugar"
- Matt Zarley – "Trust Me"
- Michel Teló – "Ai Se Eu Te Pego"
- Miley Cyrus – "Party in the U.S.A."
- Mini Viva – "I Wish"
- M.O – "Preach"

==== N ====
- N-Dubz featuring Mr Hudson – "Playing with Fire"
- N-Dubz – "Say It's Over"
- Nathan Sykes – "Over and Over Again"
- Natural Born Grooves – "Candy On The Dancefloor"
- New World Sound & Thomas Newson feat. Lethal Bizzle – "Flutes"
- (2010) Nicole Scherzinger – "Poison", "Don't Hold Your Breath", "Try With Me", "Boomerang", "Your Love"
- Nightcrawlers feat Taio Cruz – "Cryin' Over You"

==== O ====
- Ola – "All Over The World"
- Olly Murs – "Thinking of Me"
- Olly Murs featuring Travis McCoy – "Wrapped Up"

==== P ====
- Paloma Faith – "Upside Down", "Only Love Can Hurt Like This"
- Paulina Rubio – "Boys Will Be Boys"
- Priyanka featuring Pitbull – "Exotic"
- Priyanka – "I Can't Make You Love Me"
- Phil Dust featuring Jaron Storm – "Head Over Boots"
- Pixie Lott – "Gravity", "Won't Forget You" with Style G
- Preditah – "Selecta"
- Professor Green featuring Emeli Sande – "Read All About It"

==== R ====
- RedOne featuring Enrique Iglesias, R. City, Serayah & Shaggy – "Don't You Need Somebody"
- Rihanna featuring Calvin Harris – "We Found Love"
- Rita Ora – "Your Song"
- Rixton – "Wait On Me"
- Rizzle Kicks – "Skip to the Good Bit"
- Robbie Williams – "Bodies"
- Rochelle – "Fer De Lance"
- Rudedog – "Feel The Power Of Bass"
- Ruth Lorenzo – Dancing in the Rain

==== S ====
- The Saturdays – "Work" – "Missing You" – "Not Giving Up"
- Selena Gomez – "Come & Get It"
- Sevyn Streeter featuring Chris Brown – "It Won't Stop"
- Scarlette Fever – "Black & White"
- Scouting for Girls – "Famous"
- Seinabo Sey – "Pretend"
- Skepta featuring N-Dubz – "So Alive"
- Shab – "Serenity"
- Shane Filan – "Everything to Me"
- Shaun Baker – "Frontline"
- Sia – "Alive"
- Sophi – "This Is Our Love"
- (2020) Steps – "What the Future Holds"
- Steve Mac – "Paddy's Revenge"
- Stylo G – "Move Back", "Soundbwoy"
- Sway – "Level Up"

==== T ====
- Taio Cruz – "She's Like a Star"
- Take That – "Higher Than Higher"
- Tara McDonald – "Creatures of the Night"
- Taylor Swift – "Teardrops on My Guitar"
- TV Rock & Zoë Badwi – "Release Me"

==== U ====
- Ultra – "Addicted To Love"
- Union J – "Tonight (We Live Forever)"

==== W ====
- The Wanted – "Lose My Mind"
- Westlife – "Dynamite"
- Will Young – "Come On", "Joy"
- Will Ferrell and Molly Sandén – "Husavik (My Hometown)"
- Wretch 32 featuring Jacob Banks – "Doing OK"

==== Y ====
- Yes Lad – "Something More"

==== Z ====
- Zendaya – "Replay"
