= Rescue Me (Skepta song) =

Single by Skepta

from the album Doin' It Again
- Released: 27 June 2010
- Recorded: 2009
- Genre: Breakstep; dubstep; grime
- Length: 3:13 (radio edit)
- Label: Boy Better Know; 3 Beat; All Around the World
- Songwriter(s): Joseph Junior Adenuga; Greg Bonnick; Leon Price; P Renshaw
- Producer(s): Agent X

Skepta singles chronology
"Bad Boy" (2009)	"Rescue Me" (2010)	"Cross My Heart" (2010)

"Rescue Me" is a song by British rapper Skepta. It released as a digital download on 27 June 2010 as the second single from his third studio album Doin' It Again (2011). The song peaked at number 14 on the UK Singles Chart, beating the chart position of Skepta's previous single, "Bad Boy". The track is produced by Agent X – who had also produced "Bad Boy". It is the second single released from his third studio album. The official music video was directed by Shane Davey.

== Critical reception ==
Fraser McAlpine of BBC Chart Blog gave the song a positive review stating:

Ha! Brilliant! For reasons too complicated to explain, my first experience of this song was a dodgy YouTube link which I was trying (and mostly failing) to watch on a crowded train on a really hot day. I knew this was the latest club banger from Skepta, an MC with a lot of love riding on his back. Unfortunately, I could only watch the first 21 seconds (which might sound like the feed line for a So Solid Crew joke, but it's not), and could not work out what on Earth was going on.

I mean, acoustic guitar? Earnestly-sung lyrics about self-development and things going wrong? Isn't that the preserve of your rock-type people? Surely someone has mis-labelled the YouTube clip? Surely there's been some kind of MISTAKE?

And then, in a miraculous parting of the binary clouds, letting pure information shine through, the rest of the video suddenly arrived. And that's when things started to become very clear..

== Track listing ==
iTunes digital download
No.	Title	Length
1.	"Rescue Me" (Radio Edit)	3:13
2.	"Rescue Me" (Sigma Mix)	5:36
3.	"Rescue Me" (Hervé Trust Me Mix)	4:24
4.	"Rescue Me" (Melé Mix)	5:32
5.	"Rescue Me" (Ruff Loaderz Mix)	5:48

== Chart performance ==
On 10 July 2010, "Rescue Me" entered the UK Singles Chart at number 14 – which is Skepta's highest-charting position currently. The next week, it slipped down to number 19.

=== Weekly charts ===
Chart (2010)	Peak position
UK Singles (OCC)	14
UK Hip Hop/R&B (OCC)	6
