= Callum Beattie =

Scottish singer (born 1989)

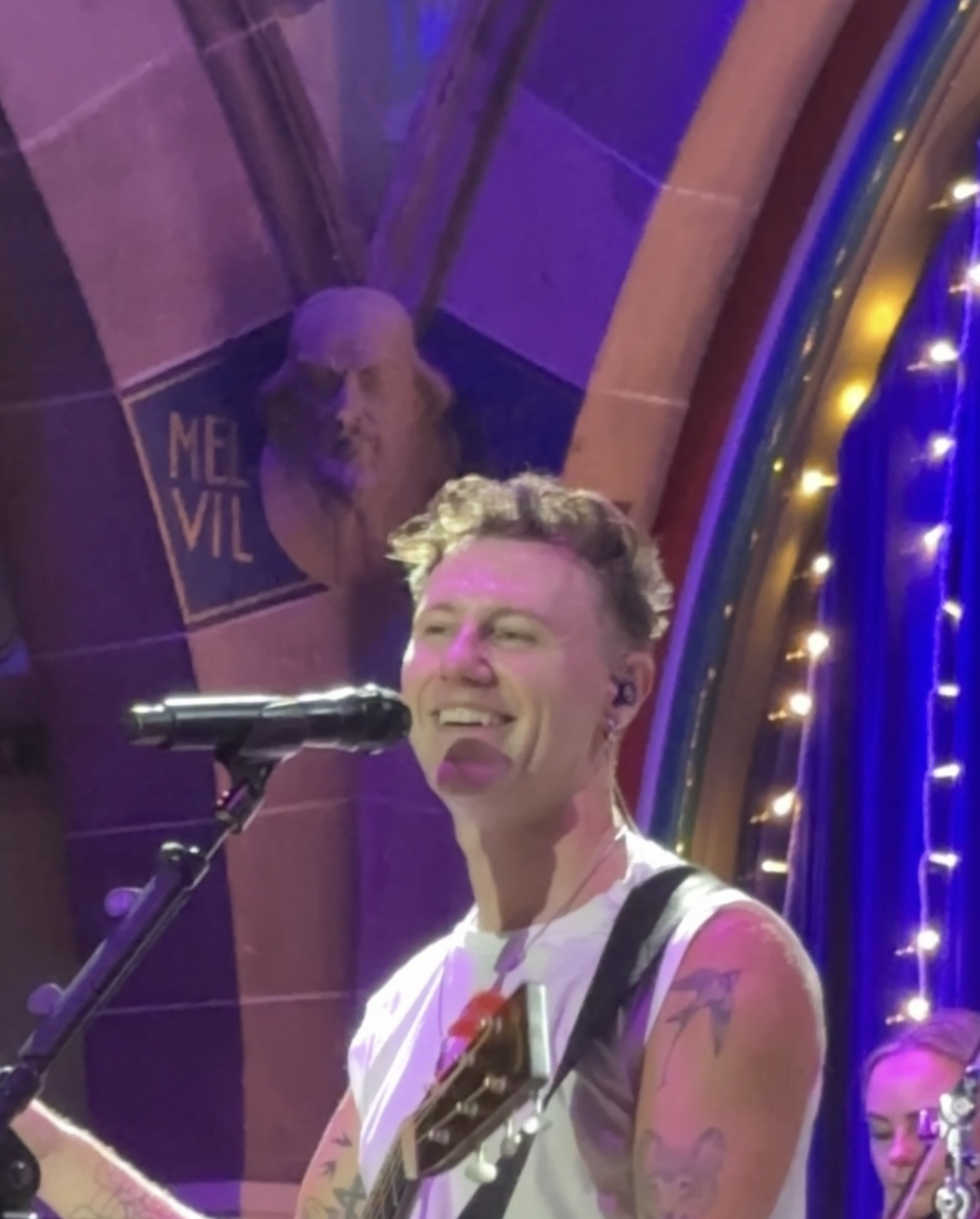

Background information
- Born: Callum David Beattie; 17 October 1989 (age 36); Musselburgh, East Lothian, Scotland
- Genre: Indie
- Occupation: Singer-songwriter
- Instruments: Vocals; Piano; Guitar
- Years active: 2017–present
- Labels: 3 Beat Records; AATW; Universal
- Website: callumbeattiemusic.com

Callum Beattie is a Scottish singer-songwriter. He has released eighteen singles, three EPs and his debut album People Like Us was released in May 2020. His second album Vandals was released in February 2023. His third album INDI was released in January 2026.

== Career ==
Beattie grew up in Musselburgh, East Lothian and released his first single "We Are Stars" in 2017. In 2019, he uploaded the anti-Brexit and Conservative Party song "Boris Song" onto YouTube, becoming viral. His debut album People Like Us was released in 2020, reaching number 18 on the UK Albums Chart's mid-week chart according to Official Charts Company, and eventually debuting at number 68 with sales of 1,449 units. In May 2020 Beattie was interviewed by Robin Galloway on Pure Radio about his pride in the Scottish sound of the album, saying that his "heart will always lie back home".

On 26 June 2020 Beattie released his first music video for the song "Salamander Street", about a former classmate, who became a prostitute in Edinburgh.

On 24 February 2023, Beattie released his second album, VANDALS. The album reached number one on the national iTunes chart, ahead of Gorillaz, Pink and Adam Lambert. VANDALS also went straight to number one on the Scottish album charts. The first single from the album, “Heart Stops Beating”, remained on the Bauer Radio playlist for two years. Beattie’s first independent and third album, INDI, is scheduled for release in January 2026. The first single from the album, “Two Pretenders”, was released on 11 September 2025. In November 2025, he released “It Always Rains in Glasgow”, which is also included on INDI.

In November 2025, Callum headlined Glasgow's OVO Hydro in front of approximately 12,000 People. He played a sell out gig at an Edinburgh Castle in July 2026. He also sang “Yes Sir, I Can Boogie” at the opening ceremony for the 2026 Commonwealth Games in Glasgow to rave reviews.

== Discography ==
=== Albums ===
Title	Details	Peak chart positions	
Title	Details	SCO	UK
People Like Us	Released: 15 May 2020; Label: 3 Beat, AATW; Formats: Digital download, CD	1	68
Vandals	Release date: 24 February 2023; Label: 3 Beat; Formats: Digital download, CD	1	22
Indi	Release date: 23 January 2026; Label: Cooking Vinyl; Formats: Digital download, CD	1	4

=== Singles ===
Title	Year	Peak chart positions		Album
Title	Year	SCO	UK Down.	Album
"We Are Stars"	2017	—	—	People Like Us
"Man Behind the Sun"	2017	—	—	People Like Us
"Connection"	2019	—	—	People Like Us
"Easter Road"	2019	—	—	People Like Us
"Talk About Love"	2020	—	—	People Like Us
"Some Heroes Don't Wear Capes"	2020	—	—	People Like Us
"Salamander Street"	2020	6	49	People Like Us
"Fuckers"	2020	13	—	People Like Us (Scottish Edition)
"Don't Walk Alone"	2020	12	—	People Like Us (Scottish Edition)
"Tears in My Eyes"	2021	—	—	People Like Us (Scottish Edition)
"It's Christmas"	2021	—	—	Non-album single
"Heart Stops Beating"	2022	—	95	Vandals
"Can’t Kill the Summer"	2022	—	—	Vandals
“Something In My Eye"	2024	—	18	Non-album single
"Two Pretenders"	2025	—	—	INDI
"Birthday"	2025	—	—	INDI
"It always Rains In Glasgow"	2025	—	—	INDI
"Pins and Needles"	2025	—	—	INDI
"—" denotes a recording that did not chart or was not released in that territory.
