= So Alive (Skepta and N-Dubz song) =

Single by Skepta vs. N-Dubz

from the album Doin' It Again and Love.Live.Life
- Released: 6 February 2011
- Recorded: 2010
- Genre: Grime; hip hop
- Length: 2:59 (radio edit); 3:38 (album version)
- Label: 3 Beat, All Around the World
- Songwriter(s): J. Adenuga; Contostavlos; Tulisa Contostavlos; Richard Rawson
- Producer(s): J. Adenuga

Skepta singles chronology
"Cross My Heart" (2010)	"So Alive" (2011)	"Amnesia" (2011)

N-Dubz singles chronology
"Girls" (2010)	"So Alive" (2011)	"Morning Star" (2011)

Music video
- Video on YouTube

"So Alive" is a song by British MC Skepta and British trio, N-Dubz. It was released as an official single on 6 February 2011. It is the fourth single released Skepta's third album Doin' It Again and N-Dubz's third album Love.Live.Life. The single peaked at #99 on the UK Singles Chart.

== Background ==
The song's radio edit lasts just under three minutes, while the album version has a longer intro and lasts nearly four minutes Skepta described the song to Digital Spy: "It's a fusion. N-Dubz are seen as a pop group and I'm more of an urban artist. Normally when those two collide the result is a big pop tune, but I wanted to do it the other way around and bring out N-Dubz's grime side. Fortunately fans of mine and N-Dubz both seem to love it!" He also explained the delay of the official single release: "I've been waiting for the right time to get it out. There was a bit of a rat race last year with so many grime artists coming out, but I feel like I've got a clear run at the moment and there's a buzz about it. Timing is everything."

== Music video ==
The music video for "So Alive" premiered on 19 November 2010 on YouTube. At most points of the video, both Skepta and N-Dubz are all shown rapping in a ring of fire and on top of a building. The video ends with Skepta slowly jumping off the building. Dappy and Fazer are also shown in front of red illuminated gates individually during their verses. The video has over 3,500,000 views as of 22 August 2012.

== Track listings ==
Digital download / CD single
No.	Title	Length
1.	"So Alive" (Radio Edit)	2:59
2.	"So Alive" (Cahill Radio Edit)	3:24
3.	"So Alive" (Cahill Club Mix)	6:00
4.	"So Alive" (Document One Mix)	3:06
5.	"So Alive" (Metrik Mix)	4:29
6.	"So Alive" (ShockOne Radio Edit)	4:11

== Personnel ==
- Lead vocals – Skepta and N-Dubz
- Producers – J. Adenuga
- Lyrics – J. Adenuga, Contostavlos, Tulisa Contostavlos, Richard Rawson
- Label: All Around the World

== Chart performance ==
=== Weekly charts ===
Chart (2011)	Peak position
UK Singles (The Official Charts Company)	99
UK Hip Hop/R&B (OCC)	26

== Release history ==
Region	Date	Format	Label
United Kingdom	6 February 2011	Digital Download, CD single	3 Beat, All Around the World
