= Doin' It Again =

Studio album by Skepta
- Released: 31 January 2011
- Recorded: 2010
- Genre: Grime
- Length: 49:50
- Label: Boy Better Know; 3 Beat; All Around the World
- Producer: Skepta; Agent X; S-X, Drew

Skepta chronology
Been There Done That (2010)	Doin' It Again (2011)	Community Payback (2011)

Singles from Doin' It Again
- 1. "Bad Boy" Released: 15 March 2010; 2. "Rescue Me" Released: 27 June 2010; 3. "Cross My Heart" Released: 17 October 2010; 4. "So Alive" Released: 9 December 2010; 5. "Amnesia" Released: 27 February 2011

Doin' It Again is the third studio album by English rapper Skepta. It features artists N-Dubz, Preeya Kalidas, Charlee Drew, Boy Better Know and Chip and was released on 31 January 2011 on Boy Better Know and All Around the World. The album's release was preceded by four singles which attained varied chart success on the UK Top 40 Singles chart throughout 2010.

== Background ==
The album consists of 15 tracks, seven which feature artists (with one artist being uncredited) and "Hello, Good Morning" recorded by both Skepta and Diddy-Dirty Money. For the song "Big", Skepta collaborated with fellow English rapper Chipmunk. Skepta told The Sun: "Chipmunk and me were out in the West End clubbing together. I'd made 'Big' for my album with the producer S-X. I played it to Chipmunk on the way home that night when we driving back from the club together and he loved it so much that he came to my studio the next day to put in his verse down on it.". The album is presumably named after a song on Skepta's first album "Greatest Hits", which is called "Doin' It Again". Currently the album has released four singles; three which have charted in the Top 40 and one just in the Top 100 of the UK Singles Chart.

== Reception ==
Professional ratings
Aggregate scores
Source	Rating
Metacritic	56/100
Review scores
Source	Rating
Allmusic	3.5/5 stars
BBC	(Positive)
The Guardian	3/5 stars
NME	3/10 stars

Reviews for Doin' It Again have been mixed. The Observer said "This third album is clearly a bid for international recognition, but the transition feels uncomfortable at times". The Guardian was more positive saying that Skepta had "a distinctive, authentic voice and a sharp sense of humour". However, NME were far more negative saying "this is the sound of grime destroying itself"

The track "All Over The House", which had been released in a previous version on a previous album, also caused controversy when Skepta's video was released, which contained pornographic scenes of a pair of pornstars.

== Singles ==
- "Bad Boy" is the first single from the album; it was released on 15 March 2010 and entered at number 34 on Wednesday 17 March 2010. Then 4 days after on 21 March 2010 climbed 8 places from the mid-week chart to number 26. In the same week, it reached number 8 on the UK R&B Chart and a number 1 on the UK Indie Chart.
- "Rescue Me" is the second single from the album it was released on 27 June 2010, it entered the UK Singles Chart at number 14 - which is Skepta's highest chart position currently. The next week it slipped down to number 19. The song features Greg Timberlake who is uncredited.
- "Cross My Heart" is the third single from the album which features Preeya Kalidas. It was released on 17 October 2010 and reached number 31 on the UK Singles Chart.
- "So Alive" is the fourth single which features N-Dubz, who are credited as "vs. N-Dubz" It was released for digital download on 9 December 2010. It is to release as a single on 6 February 2011.
- "Amnesia" is the fifth single from the album. It was released for digital download on 27 February 2011.

== Track listing ==
No.	Title	Producer(s)	Length
1.	"Nobody Made Me"	Skepta	3:03
2.	"Rescue Me"	Agent X	3:14
3.	"Amnesia"	Bass Boy Flush	3:55
4.	"Bad Boy"	Agent X	2:50
5.	"Skit"		0:28
6.	"Do It Like Me"	Skepta; BeatGeak; Jimmy Joker	4:39
7.	"Thrown in the Bin" (featuring Boy Better Know)	Skepta	2:52
8.	"Cross My Heart" (featuring Preeya Kalidas)	Skepta	2:53
9.	"Big" (featuring Chipmunk)	S-X	5:18
10.	"Taking Too Long" (featuring Charlee Drew)	Charles Drew; James Davey	3:26
11.	"All Over the House" (featuring Shorty)	Skepta	4:16
12.	"So Alive" (vs. N-Dubz)	Skepta	3:38
13.	"Hello Good Morning" (Grime Remix featuring Diddy-Dirty Money)	Danja; Skepta (add.)	2:39
14.	"Doin' It Again"	Mr. Mitch	3:38
15.	"Mike Lowery" (iTunes Bonus Track)	Skepta	3:01

Notes

- ^{A} - Greg Bonnick of Agent X also featured on this track, but was not credited.
- "All Over the House" was first released on Skepta's mixtape Been There Done That in 2010, The mixtape version featured Majestic and Shorty.

== Chart performance ==
On 6 February 2011, "Doin' It Again" entered the UK Albums Chart at number 19.

Chart (2011)	Peak position
UK Albums Chart	19
UK R&B Chart	2
UK Download Chart	7

== Release history ==
Region	Date	Format	Label
United Kingdom	31 January 2011	Digital download, CD	3 Beat, AATW
