= Blurred (song) =

1996 single by Pianoman

Single by Pianoman
- Released: 3 June 1996
- Length: 3:56 (original edit)
- Label: 3 Beat Music; Ffrreedom
- Songwriters: Damon Albarn; Graham Coxon; Alex James; Dave Rowntree
- Producer: James Sammon • Dave Creffield

"Blurred" is a song by English dance music producer Pianoman. The song is a mix of mid-'90s dance production (such as a prominent synthesizer riff running throughout the song), a sample of the chorus from the Blur song "Girls & Boys", and a piano melody from Jimi Polo's "Better Days". It was a hit in Ibiza in 1995 before being officially released the next year. The song reached number six on the UK Singles Chart after Blur approved the sample. It remains Pianoman's only hit single.

== Track listings ==
UK CD single

1. "Blurred" (Pianoman original edit)
2. "Blurred" (Pianoman original club mix)
3. "Blurred" (Hed Boys Seka mix)
4. "Blurred" (Pianoman Move to the Groove dub)
5. "Blurred" (Hed Boys Move to the Groove Seka dub)
6. "Blurred" (P.C.P. Classic Piano mix)

UK 12-inch single

A1. "Blurred" (Pianoman original club mix)
A2. "Blurred" (P.C.P. Classic Piano mix)
B1. "Blurred" (Hed Boys Seka mix)
B2. "Blurred" (Hed Boys Move to the Groove Seka dub)

UK cassette single

1. "Blurred" (Pianoman original edit)
2. "Blurred" (Pianoman original club mix)

European and Australian CD single

1. "Blurred" (Pianoman original edit)
2. "Blurred" (Pianoman original club mix)
3. "Blurred" (Hed Boys Seka mix)
4. "Blurred" (Pianoman Move to the Groove dub)

== Charts ==
=== Weekly charts ===
Chart (1996)	Peak position
Europe (Eurochart Hot 100)	23
Finland (Suomen virallinen lista)	19
Ireland (IRMA)	11
Scotland Singles (Official Charts)	8
UK Singles (Official Charts)	6
UK Dance (Official Charts)	2

=== Year-end charts ===
Chart (1996)	Position
UK Singles (OCC)	100
