= Pianoman =

James Sammon, UK dance music producer

Pianoman is the alias of dance music producer James Sammon from Bradford, West Yorkshire who got to number 6 in the UK Singles Chart with the hit single "Blurred" in June 1996. His follow-up to "Blurred" released on 3 Beat Records was from a Belinda Carlisle sample of "Live Your Life Be Free", entitled "Party People (Live Your Life Be Free)" which narrowly missed a place in the UK Top 40, peaking at number 43.

Sammon used the assistance of music production engineers for the majority of the tracks that he produced. As well as his own commercial releases and remixes, he has worked and recorded/remixed for musicians such as Ian Brown, Craig David and Donna Air. Pianoman has had many other guises, the most successful being Bass Boyz which was signed to Polydor and reached number 74 in September 1996 with "Gunz and Pianos".

The name Pianoman was first popularized by the Billy Joel song "Piano Man", but this was not the reason for Sammon's use of the name, due to the many records he released during the 1990s (whilst he managed a record shop, and worked on several local Yorkshire pirate radio stations) that were dance music piano anthems, including "That Whitney Tune" featuring samples from "I Wanna Dance with Somebody (Who Loves Me)"; a Bolton record shop owner would call Sammon 'Pianoman' whenever they met. This would lead to the use of that name for his future releases, and become his best known moniker.

Although known for the commercial dance sound, he has produced tracks and released vinyl in many dance styles, from drum and bass, garage, 2-step and house to R&B. His first release was The Happy Hardcore EP billed as DJ Sammon, the name he took to using during his ten-year stint on pirate radio.

In his twenties, Sammon began on one of Yorkshire's first pirates radio stations, the Bradford based station Paradise City Radio, and worked at several others, including Dream 107.6 FM.

Since 2006, Sammon along with his writing and producing partner Alan Hinton has written, produced and remixed tracks under a variety of aliases covering different genres of dance music including bassline, house, hardcore, Eurodance and funky house. As of 2008, he was signed to Ministry of Sound in the UK under the 2tyme and Service Crew alias, mainly a bassline act and co-writing original material such as "Missing You", "Ain't Your Sweet Thing", "So Hot" and "Tease Me Please Me". Other names used by Sammon to produce bassline include Hidden Agenda and Serious Business.

Sammon and his partner Alan Hinton are signed as Phonik to AATW Records with a track called "Something Special" featuring Sally Jaxx on vocals. Additional members of Phonik include Kenny Hayes and Ben Trengrove. Currently, Sammon has his own publishing company called Blurred Music which is administered by Bucks Music Group and a record label called Salford Central Records.
