= Fantasy (Bashy song) =

Single by Bashy featuring Preeya Kalidas
- Released: 26 July 2010
- Recorded: 2010
- Genre: Drum and bass, pop rap
- Length: 3:04
- Label: Mercury
- Songwriter(s): Ava Knox, Chris Peters, Drew Peters
- Producer(s): Peters & Peters

Bashy singles chronology
"When the Sky Falls" (2010)	"Fantasy" (2010)	"Make My Day" (2010)

Preeya Kalidas singles chronology
"Shimmy" (2010)	"Fantasy" (2010)	"Cross My Heart" (2010)

"Fantasy" is a song by British rapper Bashy, featuring vocals from Indian singer and actress, Preeya Kalidas. The song was released as a single on July 26, 2010, via digital download. It interpolates Baby D's "Let Me Be Your Fantasy". The music video for "Fantasy" was filmed in Los Angeles, while Bashy was supporting Gorillaz' North American tour. The video does not feature Kalidas. The single charted at No. 88 on the UK Singles Chart.

== Track listing ==
1. "Fantasy" - 3:53
2. "Fantasy" (Peter Doyle Fantastic Fantasy Mix) - 7:58
3. "Fantasy" (Specimen A Mix) - 5:24

== Chart performance ==
Chart (2010)	Peak position
UK Singles (OCC)	88
Scotland (OCC)	41
