= People Like Us (Callum Beattie album) =

Studio album by Callum Beattie
- Released: 15 May 2020
- Labels: 3 Beat Records; AATW
- Producers: Steve Chrisanthou; Dan Grech; Ken Nelson; David Jürgens; Chris Potter

Callum Beattie chronology
People Like Us (2020)	Vandals (2023)

Singles from People Like Us
- 1. "We Are Stars" Released: 31 March 2017; 2. "Man Behind the Sun" Released: 11 August 2017; 3. "Connection" Released: 28 March 2019; 4. "Easter Road" Released: 13 September 2019; 5. "Talk About Love" Released: 14 February 2020; 6. "Some Heroes Don't Wear Capes" Released: 12 May 2020; 7. "Salamander Street" Released: 26 June 2020

Singles from People Like Us (Scottish Edition)
- 1. "Fuckers" Released: 9 October 2020; 2. "Don't Walk Alone" Released: 6 November 2020; 3. "Tear in My Eyes" Released: 5 February 2021

People Like Us is the debut studio album by Scottish singer-songwriter Callum Beattie. It was released in the United Kingdom on 15 May 2020 by 3 Beat Records and AATW. The album peaked at number one on the Scottish Albums Charts. Callum had the backing support of drummer James Connor and guitarist Jake Bremner for parts of this album produced in May 2020. The album will be re-released on 27 November 2020 featuring five new songs including the singles "Fuckers" and "Don't Walk Alone".

== Singles ==
"We Are Stars" was released as the lead single from the album on 31 March 2017. "Man Behind the Sun" was released as the second single from the album on 11 August 2017. "Connection" was released as the third single from the album on 28 March 2019. "Easter Road" was released as the fourth single from the album on 13 September 2019. "Talk About Love" was released as the fifth single from the album on 14 February 2020. "Some Heroes Don't Wear Capes" was released as the sixth single from the album on 12 May 2020. "Salamander Street" was released as the seventh single from the album on 26 June 2020. The song peaked at number six on the Scottish Singles Charts. "Fuckers" was released as the first single from the reissued edition of the album on 9 October 2020. The song peaked at number thirteen on the Scottish Singles Charts. "Don't Walk Alone" was released as the second single from the reissued edition of the album on 6 November 2020. The song peaked at number twelve on the Scottish Singles Charts. "Tear in My Eyes" was released as the third single from the reissued edition of the album on 5 February 2021.

== Track listing ==
Credits adapted from Tidal.

Standard edition
No.	Title	Writer(s)	Producer(s)	Length
1.	"Mouth of a Tiger"	Callum Beattie; Jim Duguid; Steve Chrisanthou	Steve Chrisanthou	3:11
2.	"We Are Stars"	Beattie; David Whitmey	Dan Grech	3:14
3.	"Bonfires"	Beattie; David Whitmey	Ken Nelson	3:21
4.	"Nothing Hurts Like You"	Beattie; Jonny Lattimer	Grech	3:19
5.	"Easter Road"	Beattie; Max McElligott	Nelson	3:28
6.	"Man Behind the Sun"	Beattie; Charles Macdonald; Duguid	Nelson	2:58
7.	"Some Heroes Don't Wear Capes"	Beattie; Dan McDougal	David Jürgens	3:18
8.	"Daddy's Eyes"	Beattie; Jürgens; Iain Bruce; Duguid	Jürgens	3:05
9.	"Therapy"	Beattie; Duguid		3:33
10.	"Talk About Love"	Beattie; Mike Halls	Jürgens	3:19
11.	"Play"	Beattie; Jürgens; Martin Gallop	Jürgens	2:43
12.	"Salamander Street"	Beattie; Jürgens; Al James Peden	Jürgens	3:16
13.	"Ghosts in the Dark"	Beattie	Chris Potter	4:00
14.	"People Like Us"	Beattie; Macdonald; Jürgens; Duguid	Jürgens	3:08
15.	"Secrets"	Beattie; Hannah Yadi	Nelson	1:47

Scottish Edition
No.	Title	Length
16.	"Fuckers"	2:36
17.	"Don't Walk Alone"	3:28
18.	"Trouble"
19.	"Tear in My Eyes"
20.	"Ten Things"

== Charts ==
Chart (2020)	Peak position
Scottish Albums (Official Charts)	1
UK Albums (Official Charts)	68
UK Album Downloads (OCC)	14
UK Album Sales (OCC)	7

== Release history ==
Region	Date	Format	Label
United Kingdom	15 May 2020	Digital download	3 Beat Records; AATW
