= Rhythm Masters =

Rhythm Masters are an English house music duo composed of DJs Robert Chetcuti and Steve Mac, a.k.a. Steve McGuinness.

== Biography ==
They began mixing together around 1993 after meeting in Malta, doing remixes for, among others, Todd Terry, Michael Jackson, INXS, Junior Vasquez, David Morales, and Roger Sanchez. In 2001, they released an album entitled Disconnect Your Head on Tommy Boy Records' Silver Label, and scored two club hits in the US: "Ghetto", featuring Joe Watson (#10 Hot Dance Club Songs) and "The Underground" (#6 Hot Dance Club Songs). "Underground" peaked at No. 50 on the UK Singles Chart in August 2001. The duo released tracks together into the mid-2000s, splitting to work as solo artists.

They reformed in 2015 with the record "20 Year Cycle", and have continued to release new material.
