= Trippin' (Oris Jay song) =

2001 song by Oris Jay

Single by Oris Jay featuring Delsena
- Released: 2001
- Genre: UK garage
- Label: Gusto Records, Groovilicious
- Songwriters: Oris Jay, Delsena Ramsey, Rayon Ramsey
- Producer: Oris Jay

Oris Jay singles chronology
"Brand Nu Flava" (2001)	"Trippin'" (2001)	"They Don't Know" (2002)

"Trippin'" is a song by UK garage DJ/producer Oris Jay featuring Delsena Ramsey on vocals. It was released as a single in 2001 on Gusto Records in the UK and on Groovilicious in the U.S. the following year. It charted at No. 42 on the UK Singles Chart and No. 2 on the UK Dance Singles Chart in March 2002.

== Track listing ==
"Trippin'" remixes

- "Trippin'" (Original Mix)
- "Trippin'" (Agent Sumo Radio Edit)
- "Trippin'" (Agent Sumo's Body & Seoul Mix)
- "Trippin'" (Brother Brown Club Mix)
- "Trippin'" (Brother Brown Dub)
- "Trippin'" (Darqwan Remix)
- "Trippin'" (2010 Dub)
- "Trippin'" (Brand Nu Mix)

== Cahill version ==
"Trippin' on You"
- Single cover for "Trippin' on You"

Single by Cahill featuring Nikki Belle
- B-side: "Remixes"
- Released: April 7, 2008
- Recorded: 2007, Playground Studios, Cheshire
- Genre: House
- Length: 2:49 (radio edit)
- Label: 3 Beat Blue, All Around the World
- Songwriters: Oris Jay, Delsena Ramsey, Rayon Ramsey
- Producer: Cahill

In 2007, house producers Cahill released a cover of the Agent Sumo Body & Seoul remix of "Trippin'", retitled as "Trippin' on You", featuring Nikki Belle. The song appeared on Clubland 12 that year and promos were released soon after. The song gained popularity and a music video was made for the song's full single release in 2008. The song was adopted by WAGs Abbey Clancy, Alex Curran, Coleen McLoughlin and Elen Rives as their signature track.

=== Track listing ===
Australian digital download

1. "Tripping on You" (Radio Edit) – 2:48
2. "Tripping on You" (Original Mix) – 6:23
3. "Tripping on You" (Wawa Radio Edit) – 2:36
4. "Tripping on You" (Wawa Mix) – 7:22
5. "Tripping on You" (Wawa Dub Mix) – 6:19
6. "Tripping on You" (Thomas Gold Mix) – 7:48
7. "Tripping on You" (Jesse Garcia Vocal Mix) – 5:57
8. "Tripping on You" (Jesse Garcia Instrumental Mix) – 5:42
9. "Tripping on You" (Anton Powers Mix) – 7:17
10. "Tripping on You" (Wideboys Bassline Mix) – 5:13
11. "Tripping on You" (Wideboys London Mix) – 5:58
12. "Tripping on You" (Wideboys London Radio Edit) – 3:00
13. "Tripping on You" (Alex K Mix) – 5:07

=== Music video ===
Nikki Belle in the music video for Cahill – Trippin' On You

The music video for "Trippin' on You" was filmed at a location in Liverpool in February 2008, and it stars singer Nikki Belle at a house party and the morning after it, in what the video shows to be her apartment. The livelier parts of the song, such as the chorus, are played at the same time as the house party scenes, and the less lively parts are played during the morning after scenes.

In the scenes of the house party, Nikki's hair is an afro with cornrows in one side, and is wearing a blue outfit and make-up while she is partying with her friends. In the scenes that are the morning after, Nikki appears more normal and she is wearing a grey shirt. Her apartment is empty except for herself and one other man, who is in her bed.

=== Remixes ===
Some of the official remixes are:

- Radio edit – (2:48)
- Original mix – (6:23)
- Extended mix – (4:30)
- Wawa remix – (5:18)
- Wawa vocal mix – (7:22)
- Wawa UK radio edit – (2:36)
- Thomas Gold v Dave Ramone remix – (7:48)
- Thomas Gold v Dave Ramone UK radio edit – (3:02)
- Wideboys Bassline remix – (5:13)
- Wideboys London remix – (5:58)
- Wideboys London radio edit – (3:00)
- Alex K's Ultimate NRG mix – (5:07)
- Alex K v Wilz remix – (3:31)
- Jesse Garcia vocal mix – (5:57)
- Jesse Garcia instrumental mix – (5:43)
- Anton Powers mix – (7:17)

=== Charts ===
Chart (2008)	Peak position
Netherlands (Dutch Top 40)	29
Netherlands (Single Top 100)	29
UK Singles (OCC)	25
