= Being Poor Is Expensive =

Being Poor is Expensive

Studio album by Bashy
- Released: 12 July 2024
- Recorded: December 2020 – May 2023
- Genres: British hip-hop; grime
- Length: 38:00
- Labels: Bish Bash Bosh Music; PIAS
- Producers: Toddla T; Benji B; PRGRSHN

Bashy chronology
Catch Me if You Can (2009)	Being Poor is Expensive (2024)

Singles from Being Poor is Expensive
- 1. "Sweet Boys Turned Sour" Released: 17 April 2024; 2. "Sticky" Released: 30 May 2024; 3. "Being Poor is Expensive" Released: 3 July 2024; 4. "Blessed" Released: 10 July 2024; 5. "How Black Men Lose Their Smile" Released: 2 September 2024; 6. "Made in Britain" Released: 7 November 2024

Being Poor is Expensive is the second studio album by the British rapper Bashy.

The album was released on July 11, 2024, through PIAS by Bish Bash Bosh Music Limited. The album features guest appearances from Skrapz, Haile and Roses Gabor. The album marked Bashy's return to music after a decade long hiatus. The album debuted number 3 on The Official UK Hip Hop and R&B Charts.

Being Poor is Expensive was recorded at several studios in London, with producers Toddla T, Benji B and PRGRSHN.

The concept album tells a coming-of-age story about Bashy's windrush heritage, adolescence in London, surrounded by the streets and violent lifestyle of his native London Borough of Brent. The album received positive reception from critics, who praised its themes and storytelling. The album earned Bashy an Ivor Novello nomination for the song How Black Men Lose Their Smile and three MOBO Award nominations, with the album winning Album of the Year at the 2025 MOBO Awards ceremony.

The album was named on multiple end-of-the-year lists, with Complex naming Being Poor is Expensive the best album of 2024.

== Background ==
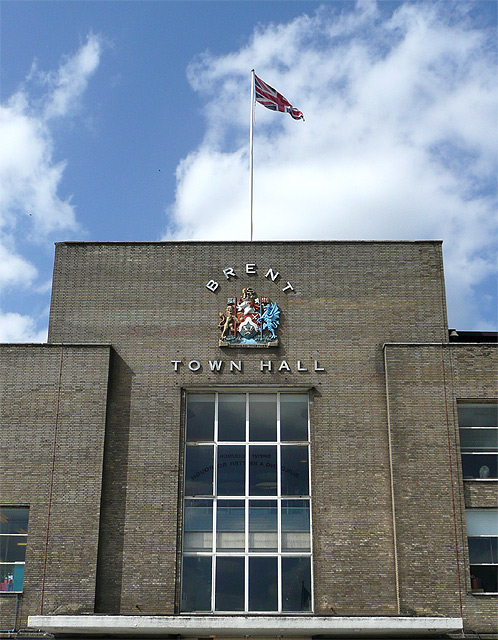
Bashy wanted to discuss life in the London Borough of Brent in the album.

After the release of his debut studio album Catch Me if you Can (2009), Bashy stepped away from recording music to focus full time on acting, transitioning from music to film and television, playing starring roles in the academy award winning film Skin, as well as TV series 24, Top Boy, Black Cake, Them and Great Expectations.

He told Complex he was reluctant to record music again because of fear and personal insecurities.

In an interview for DJ Mag, Bashy said “I relate music to a lot of trauma. It was dangerous. Music and those experiences go together. So for me to do music again meant I had to face all of that.”

The process of creating ‘Being Poor is Expensive’ began in 2020, when Bashy was filming anthology series THEM in Los Angeles, California. Production was halted due to the COVID-19 lockdown. Within the space of a week, he received separate, uncoordinated phone calls from Toddla T and West London producer PRGRSHN, with both men encouraging him to record music once more.

== Recording and production ==
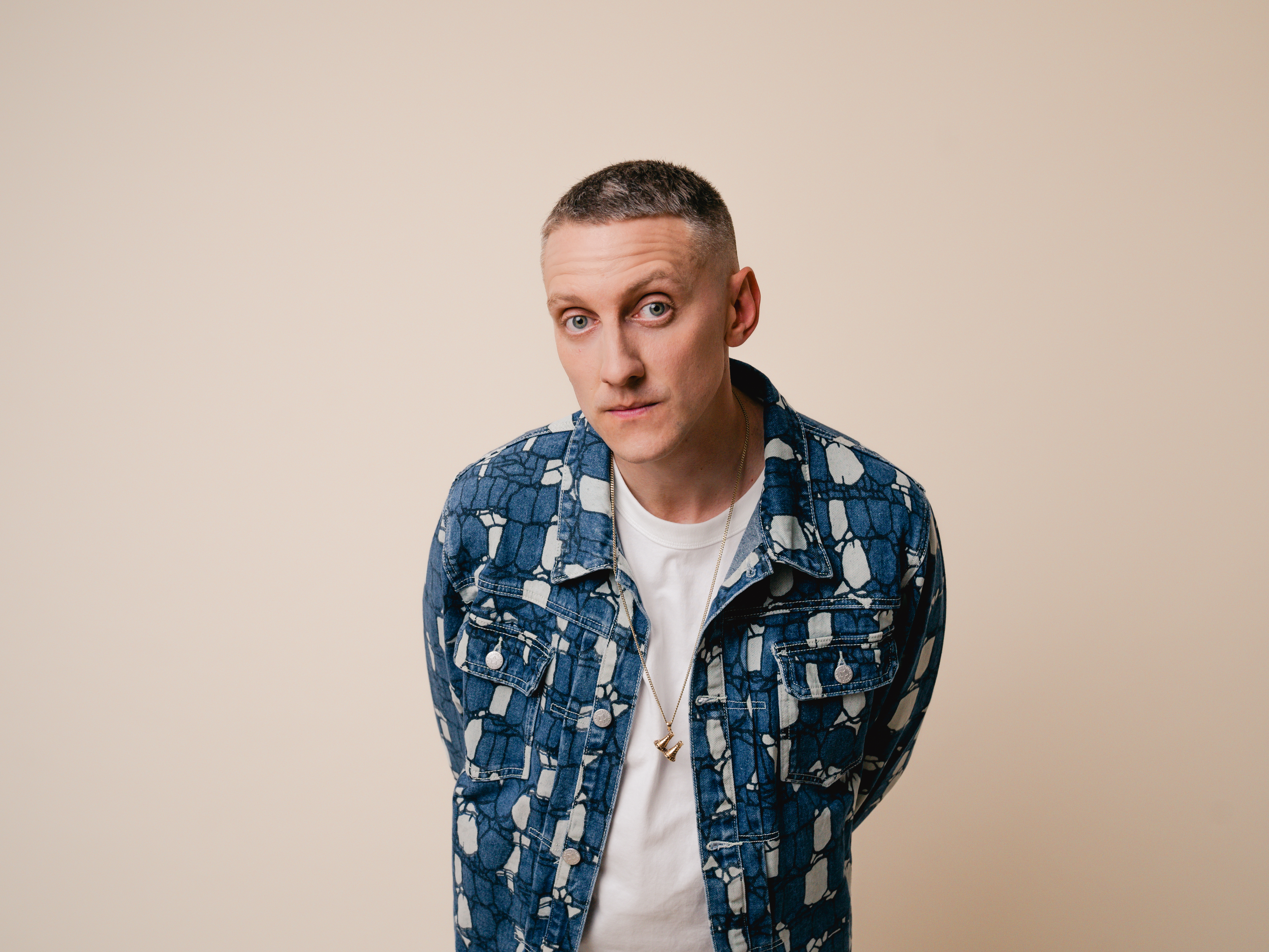
Toddla was the album's executive producer.

Recording sessions for the album began in December 2020 and took place at Buspace Studios in west London. Toddla T executive produced the album alongside Bashy himself, while PRGRSHN's soundscapes guided much of Bashy's writing and sampling choices. The first song that Bashy recorded for the album was Made in Britain, which sampled the 1976 Aswad song Back to Africa. The song serves as the sixth track on the album.

Benji B came on board as a creative contributor as well as doing additional production on 3 songs for the album; London Borough of Brent, Lost in Dreams and Midnight in Balans. House Gospel Choir were brought in to add vocals to The London Borough of Brent and Earthstrong. Bashy and Toddla T wanted to keep the soundscape of west London embedded in the production and brought in eleven-time winners of the National Panorama, The Mangrove Steel Band to add instrumentation on Earthstrong. There are three features on the album Skrapz, Haile and Roses Gabor. The album was completed March 28, 2024.

== Music and lyrics ==
"This is Bashy's first album in 15 years: I love it. The production, the skill in the writing, the passion. In New York my students were often down on UK hip-hop and grime: 'There's no narrative: it's just blip blip blap blap.' But Bashy is a consummate storyteller, although his own story – from bus driver to rapper to actor – is just the beginning here. He paints a comprehensive picture of what it was like to grow up on a tough north-west London estate, in the 80s."

— Zadie Smith"On my radar: Zadie Smith's cultural highlights". The Guardian.

Being Poor is Expensive is inspired by Jamaican sound systems and incorporates the distorted basslines that surrounded Bashy growing up. Bashy stated that he was heavily influenced by US rap, saying "Growing up, I was inspired by rappers like Nas, Jay-Z, and much later Kendrick Lamar, as well groups from De La Soul to Dip-Set, all of whom sampled the old soul or R&B records of their childhoods. This is my interpretation of that, with samples that give it a distinctly British feel. Having no hooks is deliberate, to give the feeling of having to constantly keep it moving in the ends with no respite."

Lyrically, the album chronicles Bashy's experiences in his native London Borough of Brent and gives a portrait of the streets, homes, trials and tribulations that shaped his generation, and is an homage to the migrations and journeys that came before him. The Quietus wrote "Being Poor is Expensive is a compelling window into a former life on a council estate. But as much as the album drops incisive truth bombs about Britain's class and racial divisions, it's also a heart-rending gut punch about love and hope. The hopes of children on those estates, the love between family and the love of your cultural identity. Bashy's lyricism, along with crisp production and well-judged sampling makes this worth listening to repeatedly. It is Bashy on top form in his modus operandi: storytelling."

Also commenting on the albums storytelling Dwayne Wilks of Clash views that "Bashy has been blessed with an inherent storytelling ability that spans across mediums. In the acting realm; Ashley Thomas has and will continue to add to the enclave of black Brits making waves on our big and small screens. In the acting realm, Ashley Thomas has built a reputation for telling the story of characters quite brilliantly. But UK music is infinitely better of for Bashy telling his own."

== Title and artwork ==
The record's title has two interpretations that allude to both the stresses of not having money and the extreme lengths people go through to get out of poverty. It also reflects Bashy's own experiences of how money can put strain on families that is irreparable. “Going outside and seeing what being poor looks like, seeing people that have and people that don't, people taking from others or finding ways of making money or starting to navigate their path out of their environment. That was my upbringing. But a lot of people from our area step up and make something of themselves. You find a lot of resilience and ingenuity in our communities.”

The cover artwork for Being Poor is Expensive features Bashy as a child and was created by superultrarare. The backcover featured Bashy's childhood council housing estate, The Brunel Estate in Westbourne Park, London.

== Release and singles ==
On April 16, 2024, Bashy announced via Instagram, that he would be releasing the single "Sweet Boys Turned Sour", his first release in 10 years. It was confirmed by the BBC that DJ Target would premiere the song, writing "DJ Target has the exclusive first play on new Bashy. After a 10-year musical hiatus; Ashley Thomas aka Bashy is back with Sweet Boys Turned Sour".

Ben Tibbits of Wonderland felt "It's rare for an artist who has been away for such a prolonged period of time to make an impact that has the potential to shift the scene's consensus, but Bashy's music has a seminal quality to it."

On April 17, 2024, Bashy announced the album Being Poor is Expensive set for release July 12, 2024, with the caption "It has been 15 years since my last album. 10 years I've been away from music. 5 years I've been considering crafting and releasing music again. I can only create when I truly believe or feel I have something to say and contribute to the scene, culture and the world."

He released the next single, "Sticky", via GRM Daily which samples UK garage producer Sticky's Triplets II on May 30, 2024.

On July 4, 2024, the third release from the forthcoming album was "Being Poor is Expensive", which featured alongside visuals that served as an album teaser.

Shortly after on July 11, 2024, the day before the album's release Bashy released Blessed featuring fellow north west London rapper Skrapz and west London singer Haile. With the largest media outlet platform in the UK GRM Daily citing "The track brings together three legendary stalwarts, each showcasing their individual talents to great effect".

On July 11, 2024, hosted by BBC 1Xtra at Maida Vale studios, Bashy sat down with DJ Target for an in-depth discussion about his return to music. The conversation covered the making of his new studio album, his journey from Harlesden to Hollywood, the impact of systemic racism and poverty, the importance of remembering the contributions of the Windrush generation, his advice for young actors and musicians. The interview was accompanied by a live performance of the album in its entirety and served as the launch for the sophomore album.

The album was released July 12, 2024. The album was released on streaming services, CD and vinyl.

On September 2, 2024, Bashy released How Black Men Lose Their Smile. The song samples Linton Kwesi-Johnson's 1979 song Time Come.

The first song recorded for the album, Made in Britain was released November 7, 2024.

== Critical reception ==
Being Poor is Expensive was met with positive reviews. Reviewing the album for Wonderland, Ben Tibbets said it "a criticism often laid at the feet of new wave UK rap heavyweights is that their albums are too long, lacking in cohesive structuring and thematic depth. That's certainly not the case with Thomas’ new record though. Clocking in at under 40 minutes, the LP is concise, focused, with the wordsmith never outstaying his welcome. He's refined in the message he wants to convey, anchored by the stories he wants to recite."

In the opinion of writer Liam Tyler at Occulate, the album was "Bashy was long overdue his time back at the top of UK rap"; he wrote:

"This project feels like the culmination of years of growth for Bashy, both inside and outside of music. He delves into the experience of a black man from London with sensitivity and expertise, whilst showcasing his long-honed skill as an MC. Everything he does feels deliberate, and mulling over lyrics on tracks like 'Midnight in Balans', it's clear Bashy operates with precision. 'Blessed' shows his musicianship in all its glory, and 'How Black Men Lose Their Smile' highlights the importance his voice carries. Bashy didn't return to cash in, or for relevance, or clout, quite the opposite, he came back because he had something important to say, and he executed his vision flawlessly."

— Liam Tyler

=== Accolades ===
Being Poor is Expensive appeared on several year-end top albums lists by music critics. It was named the best album of 2024 by Complex, and feature of the top album lists for Clash, NME,DJ Mag, Dazed, and The Guardian. The album was nominated for a BET Hip Hop Award, DJ MAG Award, and Sweet Boys Turned Sour was nominated for the UK Music Video Awards.

Bashy was nominated for three MOBO Awards, winning Best Hip Hop Act and Being Poor is Expensive winning the top prize of Album of the Year. How Black Men Lose Their Smile was nominated for an Ivor Novello Award for Best Contemporary Song.

== Track listing ==
Being Poor is Expensive
No.	Title	Writer(s)	Producer(s)	Length
1.	"London Borough of Brent"	Ashley Thomas; Thomas Mackenzie Bell; Benjamin Benstead	Toddla T; Temperature on Arrival	3:45
2.	"Sweet Boys Turned Sour"	Ashley Thomas; Thomas Mackenzie Bell; Kevin McPherson	Toddla T; Bashy; Aaron Levy	3:13
3.	"Being Poor Is Expensive"	Ashley Thomas; Thomas Mackenzie Bell; Ras Kassa Alexander	Bashy; Toddla T; PRGRSHN	2:21
4.	"On the Rise"	Ashley Thomas; Thomas Mackenzie Bell	Toddla T	4:32
5.	"Blessed" (featuring Skrapz and Haile)	Ashley Thomas; Thomas Mackenzie Bell; Skrapz	Toddla T; Bashy	3:38
6.	"Made in Britain"	Ashley Thomas; Thomas Mackenzie Bell; Romario Bennet	Toddla T; Bashy	4:15
7.	"How Black Men Lose Their Smile"	Ashley Thomas; Thomas Mackenzie Bell	Toddla T; Bashy	3:17
8.	"Lost in Dreams" (featuring Roses Gabor)	Ashley Thomas; Thomas Mackenzie Bell; Benjamin Benstead; Rosemary Wilson	Toddla T; Temperature on Arrival	3:19
9.	"Sticky"	Ashley Thomas; Thomas Mackenzie Bell	Toddla T; Bashy	3:12
10.	"Earthstrong"	Ashley Thomas; Thomas Mackenzie Bell; Adrian McLeod	Toddla T; Bashy	2:21
11.	"Midnight in Balans"	Ashley Thomas; Thomas Mackenzie Bell; Benjamin Benstead; Ras Kassa Alexander	Toddla T; Bashy; Temperature on Arrival; PRGRSHN	4:05
Total length:				38:00

Notes

- "On the Rise" features Turntable scratching by CJ Beatz
- "Made in Britain" features additional vocals from Thelma Stanbury

Sample credits

- "Being Poor Is Expensive” contains elements from "Let Me Down Easy” (Cobb/McCoy).
- "On The Rise" contains elements from "We Can Get Down" (Davis/Cantrall/Roper) and contains elements from "Paper Cuts" (Moss/Omoregie/Evans).
- "Blessed" contains elements from “Crazy Love” as performed by “MJ Cole”.
- “Made In Britain” contains samples from “Back to Africa” written by Courtney Hemmings and contains elements from "Pan Fried" (Bellot/May/Milliner/Robinson).
- "How Black Men Lose Their Smile" contains a sample of the recording “Time Come” as performed by Linton Kwesi Johnson and contains an interpolation of “Battle” by Wookie.
- “Lost in Dreams” contains a sample of “Melancholy Mood” by Marian M Partland. Sample replay produced by Ali Jamieson and Richard Adlam
- “Sticky” contains a sample of “Triplets 2” performed by Sticky
- "Midnight in Balans" contains a sample from “Back to Life (Acapella version”) performed by Soul II Soul. Written and composed by Jazzie B

== Personnel ==
Credits for Being Poor is Expensive adapted from discogs.

- Bashy – primary artist, executive producer
- Toddla T – executive producer, producer, mixing
- Benji B – creative contributor, producer
- PRGRSHN – creative contributor, producer
- Adam Wren – mixing
- Joker – mastering
- Tubby T – additional vocals
- Adrian McLeod – piano, synth bass, strings
- CJ Beatz – scratching
- Tayylor Made – engineer
- Thelma Stanbury – additional vocals
- Gappy Ranks – additional vocals
- Runkus – additional vocals
- Okiel McIntyre – trumpet
- House Gospel Choir - vocals
- Mangrove Steel Pan Band – steel pan
- Ross Orton – drums
- Haile – featured artist
- Roses Gabor – featured artist
- Skrapz – featured artist
- Brunel Johnson – original photography
- Dennis Morris – campaign photography
- Matt Kenyon – art direction
- Matt Black – art direction
- Holly Judge – art direction
