= Bashy =

British rapper and actor (born 1985)

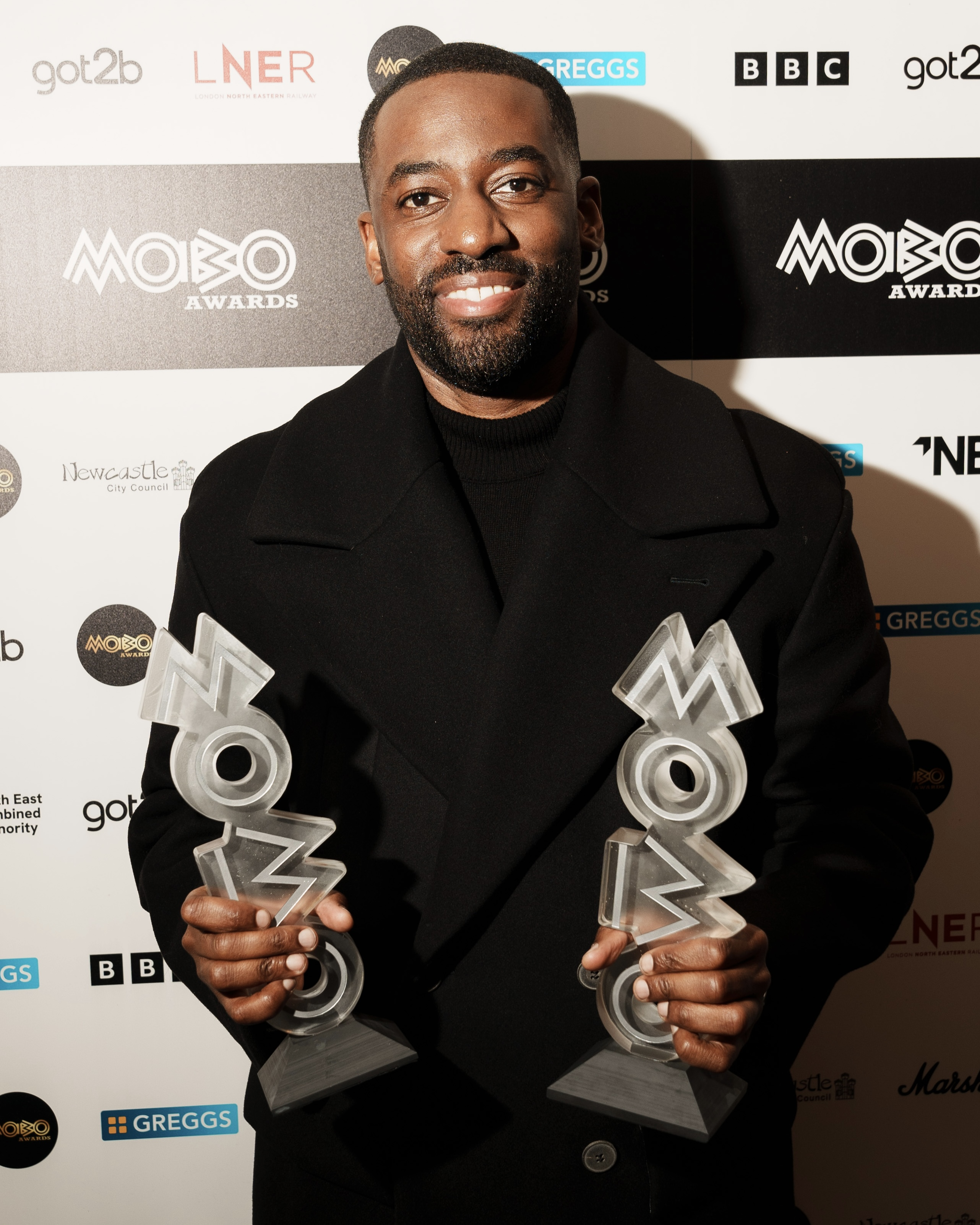
- Bashy at the MOBO Awards in 2025
- Born: Ashley Thomas; 4 February 1985 (age 41); Hammersmith, London, England
- Citizenship: United Kingdom
- Education: BRIT School
- Occupations: Rapper; songwriter; actor
- Years active: 2002–present
- Musical career
- Also known as: Bashy
- Genres: Hip-hop; British hip-hop; alternative hip-hop; grime
- Instrument: Vocals
- Years active: 2002–present
- Website: bashy.com

Ashley Thomas (born 4 February 1985), also known by the stage name Bashy, is a British actor and rapper.

== Early life and education ==
Ashley Thomas was born in Hammersmith, West London. His mother is of Jamaican heritage and his father is of Dominican heritage.

He attended St. Mary's of the Angels RC Primary School, he was later expelled from school and sent to live with his grandmother in Dominica. Aged 8, his family moved to Kensal Rise, in north-west London. He attended Cardinal Hinsley High School, where he excelled in drama studies.

Thomas went on to join the BRIT School for Performing Arts as a theatre student.

Before finding acting and music success, Thomas worked as a London bus driver during his early twenties.

== Career ==
=== Music ===
By his late teens, Thomas was a part of the UK’s emerging grime scene, rapping on pirate radio stations.

In 2007, he released the song "Black Boys". With frequent reports of shootings and stabbings on news bulletins, and with the media focusing on the lack of role models in black communities, Thomas felt that the British inner-city youth could be reminded they had a number of positive role models they could look to for inspiration.

In 2008, Thomas started working on Adulthood. Noel Clarke, the writer and director of Adulthood, first encountered Thomas when he was passed a copy of The Chupa Chups Mixtape, which contained samples from Clarke's previous film, Kidulthood. Clarke was impressed with what he heard and disregarded concerns around the copyright infringement instead finding a way for Thomas to work on the official soundtrack for Adulthood. Thomas delivered the film's theme song Kidulthood to Adulthood.

Thomas released his debut album, Catch Me If You Can in 2009. The album was nominated for the 2009 MOBO Award for Album of the Year.

In 2010, Thomas featured on the song "White Flag" by Gorillaz, from the critically acclaimed album Plastic Beach. The song saw Bashy feature alongside UK rapper Kano and the Syrian National Orchestra for Arabic Music.

In 2013, Thomas stepped away from music to focus on his acting career full time.

Thomas released his first full-length album in 15 years, Being Poor is Expensive, on 12 July 2024. The album received critical acclaim and won the 2025 MOBO Award for Album of Year. Bashy also won the MOBO Award for Best Hip Hop Act that same year. His song How Black Men Lose Their Smile was nominated for an Ivor Novello Award for Best Contemporary Song.

=== Acting ===
Thomas landed his first role in 2010 as Rager in British film Shank, an independent action film set in a decaying future London, he then went on to feature in 4.3.2.1. that same year. In April 2010, BBC Learning launched Off By Heart Shakespeare and Thomas was asked to play the role of Shylock from The Merchant of Venice.

In 2011, Thomas played the part of Mental Mickey in Cockneys vs Zombies. Later that year, he played Tyrone Jones in The Veteran. His first television role came in the winter of 2011, in the Emmy award-winning series Black Mirror, by Charlie Brooker for Channel 4 as Judge Wraith in the episode "Fifteen Million Merits".

In 2012, Thomas played the lead role in The Man Inside, opposite Peter Mullan, David Harewood and Michelle Ryan. His next film was My Brother the Devil, which received critical acclaim, winning awards at both the Sundance Film Festival and Berlin Film Festival.

In 2013, he played the recurring character Jermaine Newton in Top Boy , a role he reprised in 2019 after it was announced that Netflix was to revive the British drama series.

Early in 2015, Thomas guest-starred in the BBC series The Interceptor. Thomas' next TV appearance would be as Gil in the short-lived fantasy drama Beowulf: Return to the Shieldlands for ITV in January 2016. Thomas signed up to the ensemble cast of A Hundred Streets released the same year.

Early in 2016, it was confirmed Thomas was to appear as Calvin Hart in the HBO limited series The Night Of directed by James Marsh and Steve Zaillian. In March 2016, Thomas was set as a lead role in the 20th Century Fox Television reboot of franchise series 24 as Isaac Carter. Early in 2018, Thomas played the brother of Luca Quinn in the legal drama The Good Fight. Later that year Thomas starred in Skin, the film won the Academy Award for Best Live Action Short Film at the 91st Academy Awards.

In 2019 it was announced Thomas would co-star in the NYPD Blue reboot. That same year Thomas was set to headline the Amazon Prime horror series Them; for his performance he received an Independent Spirit Award nomination. In 2021, Thomas starred in the British limited series The Ipcress File on ITV. In February 2022, the cast for the Steven Knight's adaptation of Charles Dickens' Great Expectations for the BBC was announced, with Olivia Colman cast as Miss Havisham, Fionn Whitehead cast as Pip and Thomas cast as Mr Jaggers, becoming the first black actor to play the role; for his performance he received a Royal Television Society Programme Award nomination. Later that year, Thomas had been cast as the male lead in the Hulu drama series Black Cake opposite Adrienne Warren and Mia Isaac.

In 2023 Thomas joined the cast of The Serpent Queen as Alessandro de Medici. In March 2024, Thomas was cast in the Netflix political television series Hostage as Dr Alex Anderson, alongside Suranne Jones. Filming began that month with the working title The Choice. In November 2024 it was announced Thomas had been cast in the Channel 4 crime thriller drama series In Flight.

== Discography ==
=== Studio albums ===
List of studio albums
Year	Album details
Catch Me If You Can	Released: 1 June 2009; Label: Ragz2Richez
Being Poor is Expensive	Released: 12 July 2024; Label: Bish Bash Bosh Music

=== Mixtapes/EPs ===
- Ur Mum Vol One (2005)
- The Chupa Chups Mixtape (2007)
- Bashy.com (2008)
- The Fantasy Mixtape (2010)
- The Crunchie Mixtape (2011)
- The Great Escape EP (2012)
- Mixtape Legend Compilation (2013)

=== Singles and music videos ===
List of singles and music videos
Title	Year	Chart positions	Album
Title	Year	UK	Album
"Black Boys"	2008	—	Catch Me If You Can
"Kidulthood to Adulthood"	2008	86	Catch Me If You Can
"Who Wants to Be a Millionaire" (featuring Toddla T)	2009	—	Catch Me If You Can
"Your Wish Is My Command" (featuring H-Boogie)	2009	—	Catch Me If You Can
"Fantasy" (featuring Preeya Kalidas)	2009	88	Non-album singles
"Make My Day" (vs. NAPT)	2010	—	Non-album singles
"These Are the Songs"	2013	87	Non-album singles
"Bring the Lights Down" (featuring Jareth)	2014	—	Non-album singles

=== Guest appearances ===
- "Clones" – 2006 (by Akira the Don)
- "Time Is Right Remix" – 2009 (by Frisco, also featuring Jme and Black the Ripper)
- "She Likes To" (England Top 10) – 2009 (by Wiley)
- "White Flag" from Plastic Beach – 2010 (by Gorillaz, also featuring Kano)
- "Dead Butterflies" – Song Machine, Season One: Strange Timez (by Gorillaz, also featuring Kano and Roxani Arias)
- "4,3,2,1" – 4.3.2.1 OST (Bashy featuring Paloma Faith and Adam Deacon)
- "It's All Love" (Remix) – 2012 (by Scorcher, also featuring Talay Riley, Kano and Wretch 32)
- "Bad Boys Don't Cry" – 2013 (by Loick Essien)

== Filmography ==
=== Film ===
Year	Title	Role	Notes
2010	Shank	Rager	
2010	4.3.2.1.	Smooth	
2011	The Veteran	Tyrone Jones	
2011	Cockneys vs Zombies	Mental Mickey	
2012	The Man Inside	Clayton	
2012	My Brother the Devil	Lenny	
2016	100 Streets	Jules	
2016	Brotherhood	Calvin	
2018	Skin	Jaydee	
2018	Been So Long	Wendell	
2018	Kill Ben Lyk	Charming Ben Lyk	

=== Television ===
Year	Title	Role	Notes
2011	Black Mirror	Judge Wraith	Episode: Fifteen Million Merits
2013	Top Boy Summerhouse	Jermaine Newton	2 Episodes
2015	The Interceptor	Dexter Blair	Episode: 1.3
2016	Beowulf: Return to the Shieldlands	Gil	4 episodes
2016	The Night Of	Calvin Hart	2 Episodes
2017	24: Legacy	Isaac Carter	10 Episodes
2018	The Good Fight	Dominic Quinn	Episode: Day 429
2018	Ice	Malcolm Rose	10 Episodes
2018	Salvation	Alonzo Carter	10 Episodes
2019	Top Boy	Jermaine	5 episodes
2019	NYPD Blue	Detective Chris Gamble	Pilot (Unaired)
2021	Them: Covenant	Henry Emory	10 Episodes
2022	The Ipcress File	Paul Maddox	6 Episodes
2023	Great Expectations	Jaggers	6 Episodes
2023	Black Cake	Byron Bennett	8 Episodes
2024	The Serpent Queen	Alessandro De Medici	5 Episodes
2025	Hostage	Dr Alex Anderson	5 Episodes
2025	In Flight	Dom	4 Episodes

== Awards and nominations ==
MUSIC
Year	Award	Category	Work	Result	Ref.
2008	MOBO Awards	Best Video	"Kidulthood to Adulthood"	Nominated	
2008	Urban Music Awards	Most Inspirational Artist	–	Won	
2008	Urban Music Awards	Best Video	"Black Boys"	Nominated	
2008	Screen Nation Awards	Best Music Performance in Film/TV	–	Won	
2009	MOBO Awards	Best Album	Catch Me If You Can	Nominated	
2009	MOBO Awards	Best UK Act	–	Nominated	
2009	Urban Music Awards	Best Hip Hop	Catch Me If You Can	Nominated	
2024	UK Music Video Awards	Best Hip Hop, Rap and Grime	"Sweet Boys Turned Sour"	Nominated	
2024	BET Hip Hop Awards	Best International Flow	Being Poor is Expensive	Nominated	
2024	DJ Mag Best Of British Awards	Best Rap Album	Being Poor is Expensive	Nominated	
2025	MOBO Awards	Album of the Year	Being Poor is Expensive	Won	
2025	MOBO Awards	Best Hip Hop Act	Being Poor is Expensive	Won	
2025	MOBO Awards	Best Male Act	Being Poor is Expensive	Nominated	
2025	Ivor Novello Awards	Best Contemporary Song	"How Black Men Lose Their Smile"	Nominated	
2025	BET Awards	Best International Act		Nominated	

FILM / TV
Year	Award	Category	Work	Result	Ref.
2021	MOBO Awards	Best Performance in a TV Show/Film	Them	Nominated	
2022	Independent Spirit Awards	Best Male Performance in a Scripted Series	Them	Nominated	
2024	Royal Television Society Programme Awards	Breakthrough Talent	Great Expectations	Nominated	
