= Every Little Time =

Single by Onyx featuring Gemma J
- Released: 2004
- Recorded: 2004
- Genre: Electronic
- Length: 3:24
- Label: Data Records
- Songwriter(s): Adam Presdee, Alex Tepper, Norma Lewis, Phil Dockerty
- Producer(s): Bruce Elliott-Smith/Philip Larsen

"Every Little Time" is a song by Israeli DJ Onyx featuring Gemma J of the Real McCoy. It reached No. 66 on the UK Singles Chart.
