= Powerhouse (1997 band) =

British band

- Label: Satellite Records
- Past members: Hamilton Dean; Julian Slatter

Powerhouse is a British production duo of Hamilton Dean and Julian Slatter who reached #38 in the UK with "Rhythm of the Night" in December 1997.
