= Preeya Kalidas =

British singer, actress (born 1980)

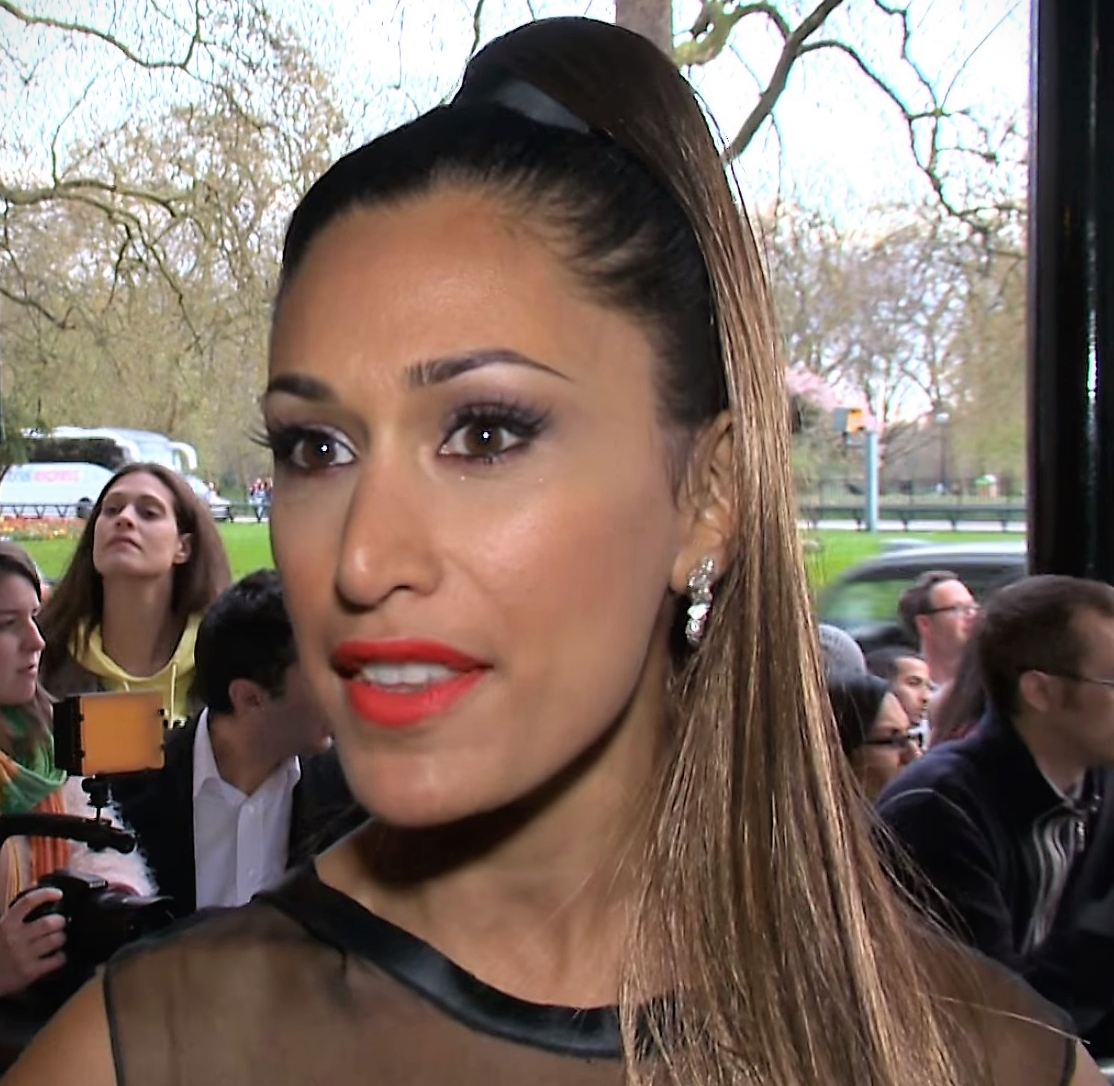
- Kalidas at The Asian Awards in 2014
- Born: 21 June 1980 (age 46); Isleworth, London, England
- Occupations: Actress; singer
- Years active: 1996–present

Preeya Kalidas (born 21 June 1980) is an English singer and actress. She played Amira Masood in the soap opera EastEnders, from 2009 to 2012. She released the single "Shimmy" in July 2010, taken from her proposed debut album (I'm Over It) Constant Craving; however, the album was never released.

== Early life ==
Preeya Kalidas was born to Indian Gujarati parents in Isleworth, London and was raised in Twickenham, South-West London. Her father is an independent financial adviser, and her mother works for British Airways. She started ballet classes at the age of three, and tap at five. She then trained at the Sylvia Young Theatre School in London. She also trained at Songtime Theatre Arts.

== Career ==
=== 1998–2010 ===
Kalidas first appeared on screen in the drama Googleyes. She went on to play Usha in a short film called Jump Boy in 1998, directed by Menhaj Huda and written by Harsha Patel. After a number of parts in films and on television, including East is East, Bollywood Queen, My Family and Casualty, in 2002 she appeared as Monica in Gurinder Chadha's film Bend It Like Beckham. She then played the female lead Priya in the Andrew Lloyd Webber-produced show Bombay Dreams, written by A.R. Rahman, Meera Syal and Don Black. She also appeared in the BBC Television series Bodies as Dr. Maya Dutta.

In 2007, Kalidas landed the female lead in a West End revival of Lloyd Webber and Tim Rice's Joseph and the Amazing Technicolor Dreamcoat. Appearing as the narrator, she performed with Lee Mead, who won the title role of Joseph in BBC One's Any Dream Will Do talent search series. The same year, she appeared in the multi-award-winning Channel 4 miniseries Britz. In 2009, Kalidas appeared in the second series of BBC One's Mistresses, and joined EastEnders in April of that year as Amira Shah, the girlfriend, and later wife of Syed Masood. In January 2010, she decided to quit EastEnders to pursue a pop career. Her final episode was broadcast on 26 April 2010. In July 2011, Kalidas revealed that she would be returning to EastEnders in the latter part of 2011. Kalidas, then left the show in March 2012. In September 2012, it was announced that Kalidas was returning to EastEnders briefly to conclude with the departures of Marc Elliott and John Partridge who play Syed Masood and Christian Clarke respectively.

Kalidas appeared in Hotel Babylon as Aisha Chaudhri, the daughter of a rich Indian hotel owner. She also appeared in the music video "Love Is Blind" by Ramzi featuring Ash King. In December 2009, she played the part of Leanne in ITV comedy drama Mister Eleven. She starred in the 2010 Chris Morris feature film Four Lions playing Sofia, the wife of protagonist Omar (played by Riz Ahmed). The film was released on 7 May.

After leaving EastEnders, Kalidas began to pursue a career in music, signing a record deal with Universal Records. Her second single, "Shimmy", featuring Mumzy Stranger, was released on 26 July 2010. Kalidas appeared on several programmes including the National Lottery Results and Loose Women in promotion of the single. The single received mixed reviews. Ruth Harrison from FemaleFirst stated that she "liked the single" but was not keen on the genre of music.

Kalidas stated in an interview with Digital Spy that her album would consist of a variety of genres. She also confirmed that the album would include collaborations with Bashy, Skepta, Schorcer, Ramzi and Mumzy Stranger. Kalidas' collaboration with Skepta, "Cross My Heart", was released in October 2010 as the lead single from Skepta's second studio album, Doin' It Again, however, at the time of release, Kalidas firmly stated its inclusion on her debut album.

=== 2011–present ===
In 2011, it was announced that due to poor sales of "Shimmy", Kalidas would no longer be releasing an album with Universal Records. In the same month Kalidas was awarded the Best Female Act award at the UK Asian Music Awards, where she performed a new song, "I Like You", alongside "Shimmy" and her collaboration with Skepta, "Cross My Heart". In July 2011, Kalidas signed a new record deal with All Around The World. In September 2011, Kalidas' second single, "It's A Problem", premiered on YouTube. The single features vocals from rapper Scorcher, who had previously been rumoured to appear on the album. The music video for "It's A Problem" premiered on 3 October 2011. The digital package of the single was released on 10 October, containing "I Like You", as well as a further new song, "Dirty Kissin'". Kalidas announced the album's third single, "A Woman Scorn" during an interview on Lorraine in November 2011. However it was never released. In June 2012, Kalidas eventually released her third single titled; "Love Between Us" which featured British producer, DaVinChe, on backing vocals.

In March 2014, Kalidas released the single "Don't Give Up" was working towards release of her debut studio album in 2015. In April 2014 she released a new single called "Can't Live Without You". Both singles will appear on the album. She has also covered a variety of tracks including Beyoncé's track "Blue".

In June 2015, Kalidas began playing the role of Pinky, in the new West End musical Bend It Like Beckham. She previously played the role of Monica in the film version. In 2019, it was announced that she would play the role of Miss Hedge in the hit musical Everybody's Talking About Jamie from 19 November.

In 2018, Kalidas co-hosted the Brit Asia TV Music Awards with Apache Indian.

== Discography ==
=== Singles ===
Year	Single	Peak chart positions	Album
Year	Single	UK	Album
2002	"Shakalaka Baby"	38	Bombay Dreams OST
2010	"Shimmy"(featuring Mumzy Stranger)	85	Constant Craving
2011	"It's a Problem"(featuring Scorcher)	–	Constant Craving
2012	"Love Between Us"	197	Constant Craving

=== Featured singles ===
Year	Single	Peak chart positions	Album
Year	Single	UK	Album
2010	"Fantasy" (Bashy featuring Preeya Kalidas)	88	The Great Escape
2010	"Cross My Heart" (Skepta featuring Preeya Kalidas)	31	Doin' It Again

== Filmography ==
=== Film ===
Year	Title	Role	Notes
1999	Virtual Sexuality	Charlotte	
1999	East Is East	Nazir's Bride	
2002	Bend It Like Beckham	Monica	
2003	Bollywood Queen	Geena	
2004	Bombay Dreams	Priya	
2010	It's a Wonderful Afterlife	Karishma	
2010	Four Lions	Sofia	
2023	Paso Doble	Tonya	Short film
2023	The Three Musketeers	Milady	Short film
2024	One Punch	Zainab	

=== Television ===
Year	Title	Role	Notes
2000	Doctors	Safiya Ranjit	1 episode
2001	Metrosexuality	Flora	
2001	The Bill	Nadia	1 episode
2001	My Family	Miranda	1 episode
2001	Casualty	Sherilyn Tilson	1 episode
2003	Bedtime	Mumtaz	2 episodes
2004	England Expects	Assma	
2004	Bodies	Maya Dutta	16 episodes
2005	Broken News	Anita Ratchathani	5 episodes
2006	Green Wing	Newsagent	
2007	Britz	Shaz	
2009	Mistresses	Carrie	
2009	Hotel Babylon	Aisha Chaudhri	
2009	Mister Eleven	Leanne	2 episodes
2009–2012	EastEnders	Amira Masood	135 episodes
2013	Bollywood Carmen Live	Carmen	Television film
2014	Casualty	Sonja Egan	1 episode
2015	The Last Hours of Laura K	Hayley Temple	Television film
2016	New Blood	Lucy	1 episode
2018	Hounslow Diaries	Aisha	1 episode
2025	Bergerac	Rachini Wilson	1 episode

== Awards and nominations ==
=== Music ===
Year	Awards	Category	Work	Result	Ref.
2011	UK Asian Music Awards	Best Female Act	Herself	Won	
2011	Brit Asia TV Music Awards	Best Female Act	Herself	Won	
2012	UK Asian Music Awards	Asian Woman Best Female	Herself	Won	

=== Radio ===
Year	Awards	Category	Work	Result	Ref.
2016	Asian Media Awards	Best Radio Show	Preeya Kalidasa Show	Nominated	

=== Television ===
Year	Awards	Category	Work	Result	Ref.
2009	Inside Soap Awards	Best Family (for Masood family)	EastEnders (Amira Masood)	Longlisted	
2010	All About Soap Awards	Bride and Doom	EastEnders (Amira Masood)	Nominated	
2010	British Soap Awards	Sexiest Female	EastEnders (Amira Masood)	Shortlisted	
2010	Inside Soap Awards	Best Wedding (with Marc Elliott)	EastEnders (Amira Masood)	Won	
2012	British Soap Awards	Sexiest Female	EastEnders (Amira Masood)	Shortlisted	

=== Theatre ===
Year	Awards	Category	Result	Work	Ref.
2003	WhatsOnStage Awards	Best Actress in a Musical	Nominated	Bombay Dreams	
2016	Laurence Olivier Award	Best Actress in a Supporting Role in a Musical	Nominated	Bend It Like Beckham	
2016	Eastern Eye Awards	Best Theatre Actress	Won	Bend It Like Beckham	
2020	Eastern Eye Awards	Best Theatre Actress	Nominated	Bend It Like Beckham	
