= Bad Boy (Skepta song) =

Single by Skepta

from the album Doin' It Again
- Released: 15 March 2010
- Recorded: 2009
- Genre: Electro-grime
- Length: 2:51 (Album Version)
- Label: Boy Better Know
- Songwriter(s): Joseph Junior Adenuga; Greg Bonnick; Leon Price
- Producer(s): Agent X

Skepta singles chronology
"Lush" (2009)	"Bad Boy" (2010)	"Rescue Me" (2010)

"Bad Boy" is a song by British grime artist Skepta. The song was released as a digital download on 15 March 2010 as the lead single from his third studio album Doin' It Again (2011). The song peaked at number 26 on the UK Singles Chart. The song was produced by Agent X and the music video is directed by "Staple House". It is the first single released from his third album Doin' It Again.

== Critical reception ==
Fraser McAlpine of BBC Chart Blog gave the song a positive review stating:

Y'know, listening to this and thinking back...it doesn't strike me that Alexandra Burke - a self-confessed fan of the badder boy - would be at all pleased if she bought a new dress and her fella failed to notice, would she?

I mean come on, she's a pop star. She went on a TV talent show in order to get constant feedback and praise from the British public every week. The very least she is going to expect from a man is the ability to tell her she looks hot in her new frock. That need for attention drives her every move, as it does for everyone.

Heck, even bad boys like Skepta do what they do partly because they're not supposed to and it makes people look. Or at least, they SAY they do the things they do because of that. There is a difference..

== Track listing ==
Digital download
No.	Title	Length
1.	"Bad Boy" (Album version)	2:51

== Chart performance ==
In the mid-week chart in the UK Singles Chart, "Bad Boy" entered at number 34 on Wednesday 17 March 2010. Then 4 days after on Sunday 21 March 2010 climbed 8 places from the mid-week chart to number 26. In the same week, it reached number 8 on the UK R&B Chart and a number 1 on the UK Indie Chart.

=== Weekly charts ===
Chart (2010)	Peak position
UK Singles (OCC)	26
UK Hip Hop/R&B (OCC)	8
UK Indie (OCC)	1
