= Shimmy (song) =

Single by Preeya Kalidas featuring Mumzy Stranger

from the album Constant Cravings
- Released: 26 July 2010
- Recorded: 2010
- Genre: Dance, pop
- Length: 3:04
- Label: Mercury
- Songwriter(s): Janet Ava Leon, Alex James

Preeya Kalidas singles chronology
"Shakalaka Baby" (2002)	"Shimmy" (2010)	"Fantasy" (2010)

"Shimmy" is a song by Swedish singer Janet Leon from her debut solo album Janet and features vocals from rapper Tha Will. It was later covered by British singer, Preeya Kalidas. It was released as a single on July 26, 2010 by Kalidas via digital download. The song features British rapper, Mumzy Stranger. The song was picked to be the lead single from Kalidas's first studio album, Constant Cravings. The single proved to be a disappointment for Kalidas' record label Mercury, debuting at #85 on the UK Singles Chart and staying inside the Top 100 for one week.

== Critical reception ==
A review on the CBBC Newsround website, aimed at Canadians, gave the song three out of five, and described it negatively: "This is [Kalidas's] first pop single and it is a mix of pop and dance with a bit of a Bollywood sound as well. Although it is good to hear a track that mixes these different types of music, it doesn't sound that original. [...] Although it's easy to sing along, the words get a bit boring quite quickly and there isn't really a story to the song. [...] It's quite a forgettable song and the tune doesn't really get stuck in your head. [...] The song isn't very good though and it probably won't do that well in the charts. Hopefully some of the other songs on her album will be a bit better." However, replies to the review disagreed with the reviewer's opinion. A review by Ruth Harrison from FemaleFirst stated, "Whilst I wish I could like the single, I just don't like this 'kind' of music at all, I can't quite get my heard around the bhangra-tinged pop-R&B stew, and there's just no 'Ooomph' to it at all. Luckily for her, she's roped in some bloke called Mumzy Stranger to help her out a bit, but his bits only take away from Preeya's efforts." Ryan Love of Digital Spy gave the song two out of five, saying the song had "bags of potential" but is "let down by a chorus that never quite hits the melodic G-spot."

== Track listing ==
1. "Shimmy" - 3:06
2. "Shimmy" (Cahill Club Mix) - 5:56
3. "Shimmy" (Desi Mix) - 5:56
4. "Shimmy" (Bimbo Jones Club Remix) - 3:58

== Chart performance ==
Chart (2010)	Peak position
UK Singles (OCC)	85
Scotland (OCC)	44
