= Onyx (DJ) =

Israeli musical artist

- Born: Yaniv Goldfarb
- Label: Bionics Records

Yaniv Goldfarb (Hebrew: יניב גולדפרב) better known as Onyx, is a DJ from Israel. He charted at #66 on the UK Singles Chart in 2004 with his song Every Little Time.
