= Say It's Over =

Single by N-Dubz

from the album Against All Odds
- Released: 25 April 2010
- Genre: Hip hop; R&B
- Length: 3:44
- Label: All Around the World
- Songwriters: Dino Contostavlos; Tula Contostavlos; Richard Rawson; Junior Edwards
- Producers: Dino Contostavlos; Richard Rawson; Junior Edwards

N-Dubz singles chronology
"Playing With Fire" (2010)	"Say It's Over" (2010)	"We Dance On" (2010)

Music video
- "Say It's Over" on YouTube

"Say It's Over" is the third single from N-Dubz's second studio album Against All Odds, released on 25 April 2010. The lyrics grapple with the difficulties of ending a relationship. It reached #20 in the UK Singles Chart.

== Music video ==
The music video was released on 11 March 2010. The video was set on a spaceship with a futuristic setting. The beginning scenes show the N-Dubz logo in front of a black background then it shows a spaceship flying in space. The camera zooms into one of the windows on the spaceship where a man dressed in white goes past on some form of segway scooter.

The next scene shows Dappy creating a floating screen with his hands and entering his name onto the screen. Tulisa and Fazer do the same in the next scenes. Then we see Dappy lying down on a black square before a screen appears behind him with the message 'INCOMING MESSAGE' on it. He then gets up off the square and a hologram of a woman appears and he starts 'arguing' with it. Later on, a man walks down a corridor in the ship with a white jumper with 'N-Dubz' on the back then the scene skips back to Dappy arguing with the hologram before he lashes out on it causing it to disappear.

It then skips to the corridor again where Tulisa is walking towards the camera and as the camera has a shot of Tulisa sideways, a man grabs her arm and pulls her towards him. Tulisa has the words 'Say It's' and 'Over' on her knuckles in big white letters outlined with black. Tulisa is seen arguing with the man who grabbed her in the background while a person uses a screen to the left of the set.

Then in the next scene a dark silver car is shown as the doors are opening and Fazer gets out one side while he girlfriend gets out the other. Fazer is seen sitting on the car while his girlfriend stands beside him while holding his chains. The girl is seen holding a rose that is pure black before the scene shifts back to Fazer and his girlfriend. The shots snap from Fazer on his own back to him arguing then his girlfriend lets go of the black rose as it stays upright.

Then we see Dappy with his arm around a woman as he sings, later the scene goes back to Tulisa and her boyfriend as she tries to get away from him but he keeps pulling her back. The next shot is with all of N-Dubz singing together with huge lights around them, similar to the single cover. This scene flicks from the group shot to Dappy, to the group shot, to Tulisa then the group shot.

We see a dark purple heart floating with a woman's hands near its sides. The woman looks down at the heart before the shot is back with N-Dubz. When it gets back to the woman with the heart, she moves her hands away from the heart, now we see N-Dubz together again, then we see the heart shatter in front of the woman sending her forward. The pieces are sent flying everywhere. We see the woman with the rose as she pushes the rose away and it catches fire. She looks back at the rose and tries to touch it but her hand recoils. Tulisa pushes the man away and walks away from him while he walks in the other direction. He gets out a little box from his pocket and reveals a ring inside it. He takes off his glasses before throwing the ring into silver slime.

We then see N-Dubz together as the scene switches between the members as well as the other characters from the video every so often. We see the car close its doors and the rose now smoking as the fire is gone.

The last scenes have all the members closing their electronic screens which appeared at the beginning of the video, the camera zooming out of the window, a final lookat the spaceship, then the N-Dubz logo appears once again then fades out.

== Track list ==
- Digital Download
1. "Say It's Over" – 3:44
2. "Say It's Over" (Cahill radio mix) – 3:33
3. "Say It's Over" (KJ's Groove radio edit) – 4:13
4. "Say It's Over" (Parker & James remix) – 6:15
5. "Say It's Over" (KJ's Groove 12" mix) – 9:54
6. "Say It's Over" (Cahill club mix) – 7:32
- CD Single
1. "Say It's Over" – 3:44
2. "Say It's Over" (Cahill radio mix) – 3:33
3. "Say It's Over" (Cahill club mix) – 7:32
4. "Say It's Over" (Parker & James remix) – 6:15
5. "Say It's Over" (KJ's Groove 12" mix) – 9:54
6. "Say It's Over" (Bronskii Dubstep remix) – 5:19
7. "Say It's Over" (Immerze remix) – 6:02

== Charts ==
=== Weekly charts ===
Chart (2010)	Peak position
Europe (European Hot 100 Singles)	59
Ireland (IRMA)	50
Scotland Singles (OCC)	27
UK Singles (OCC)	20
UK Hip Hop/R&B (OCC)	10

=== Year-end charts ===
Chart (2010)	Position
UK Singles (OCC)	198

== Certifications ==
Region	Certification	Certified units/sales
United Kingdom (BPI)	Silver	200,000^{‡}
^{‡} Sales+streaming figures based on certification alone.
