= Steve Mac (house DJ) =

British DJ (born 1965)

- Genres: House, dance, deep house, UK garage
- Occupations: Record producer, musician, DJ, remixer
- Instruments: Keyboards, synthesizer, music sequencer, samplers, drum machine, turntables
- Years active: 2001–present
- Labels: Jack Said What, Disfunktional Recordings, Variation Recordings
- Website: https://www.facebook.com/stevemacdj/

Stephen Michael McGuinness (born 11 July 1965 in Bristol, England), also known as Steve Mac, is an English house music producer and DJ. As a solo artist, he runs Variation Recordings.

== Biography ==
Mac started out as a scratch DJ at the age of 11. He met his production partner Rob Chetcuti in a hip-hop group in Malta. They formed the group, Rhythm Masters.

Mac and Chetcuti also set up a studio followed by a record label, Disfunktional Recordings in 1995. The label was mainly a showcase for the pair's own productions although artists such as Danny Tenaglia, Junior Sanchez, Paul Woolford and Giorgio Moroder also contributed.

Rhythm Masters split in 2002 to pursue solo projects, with Mac producing tracks including "Circus Parade", "Da Canto" and "Lovin' You More (That Big Track)" for record company CR2. Mac also remixed for Jamiroquai, Charlotte Church and Simply Red. The track "Lovin' You More" is used on the Radio Station "Vladivostok FM" on Grand Theft Auto: The Ballad of Gay Tony.

In 2008, Mac released the track "Gotta Have Some Fun"; and in September that year his track "Paddy's Revenge" (sampling Penguin Cafe Orchestra's 1984 song "Music for a Found Harmonium") reached number 17 in the UK Singles Chart.

Mac's most recent release is the track "The Fly" also for CR2.

== Discography ==
=== Singles ===
- 2001 Steve Mac - We Got Funk
- 2001 Steve Mac & Yousef - I Like This
- 2005 Mosquito and Steve Mac featuring Steve Smith - Lovin' You More (That Big Track) (Vocal Club Mix)
- 2006 Steve Mac & Seamus Haji feat. Erire - Happy
- 2008 Steve Mac - Gotta Have Some Fun (Original Mix)
- 2008 Steve Mac - Paddy's Revenge (Steve Mac 12" Mix)
- 2008 Steve Mac & Mark Brown - Bells Of Brighton (Original Mix)
- 2009 Steve Mac - After Sundown (Original Mix)
- 2009 Steve Mac & Mark Brown - The Fly (Original Mix)
- 2010 Steve Mac presents The Moomaloids - Cut Up Groove
- 2010 Steve Mac & D.Ramirez feat Robert Owens - Ups & Downs (Original Club Mix)
- 2011 Steve Mac & Paul Harris - You (Original Club Mix)
- 2011 Stave Mac - Dancing Together
- 2011 Steve Mac - Reaching (Original Mix)
- 2011 Steve Mac - Mousique
- 2015 Steve Mac - Wee Your Bed
- 2015 Steve Mac - Smack Dance (Original Mix)
- 2015 Steve Mac - Phoba
- 2015 Steve Mac - Musika (Original Mix)
- 2015 Steve Mac - That Big Track (Original Mix)
- 2015 Steve Mac - Keep Beating The Drum
- 2016 Mutiny UK, Steve Mac & Beth Cannon - Without You (Original Mix)
- 2023 Jon Carter & Steve Mac - Be Beautiful
- 2023 Jon Carter & Steve Mac - Finish Him!
- 2023 Steve Mac feat. Robert Owens - Wish
- 2023 Steve Mac feat. Sleezy D - Take You There
- 2023 Todd Terry & Steve Mac - Jumpin
- 2023 Steve Mac - This Is Acid Mate
- 2023 Steve Mac & Marshall Jefferson - Spirit
- 2023 Steve Mac feat. Clementine Douglas, MDMK - My Mind
- 2023 Steve Mac - Jack Said What
- 2023 Steve Mac - Go Bang
- 2023 Steve Mac & Danny Rampling feat. Robert Owens - The Changes
- 2023 Steve Mac feat. Alana Maria - The 313
- 2023 Steve Mac feat. E Raze - Summer Of Love
- 2023 Steve Mac feat. Robert Owens - One Day
- 2024 Steve Mac & Arthur Baker- Losing You 24
- 2024 Steve Mac & Arthur Baker - Sex Machine
- 2024 Steve Mac & Arthur Baker - Beans

=== Remixes ===
- 2003 Morjac ft. Raz Conway - Stars (Steve Mac Remix)
- 2004 Rune feat. Morten Luco - Nothing New (Steve Mac's Calabria Mix)
- 2005 Jamiroquai - Seven Days in Sunny June (Steve Mac Remix)
- 2006 Narcotic Thrust - Waiting For You (Steve Mac Classic Mix)
- 2007 Tommy Trash - Slide (Steve Mac Remix)
- 2010 Atrium - In Love With You (Steve Mac Remix)
- 2011 Rainer Weichhold & Boundzound - Jerk Chicken (Steve Mac Remix)
- 2023 Todd Terry - Jumpin (Steve Mac Edit)
- 2023 Serge Santiago - Rave Dance (Steve Mac Remix)
- 2024 Jungle Wonz - 20 Paces From The Moon (Steve Mac Remix)
- 2024 Chip E feat. Missy - Work That Body (Steve Mac Mix)
