= Nero discography =

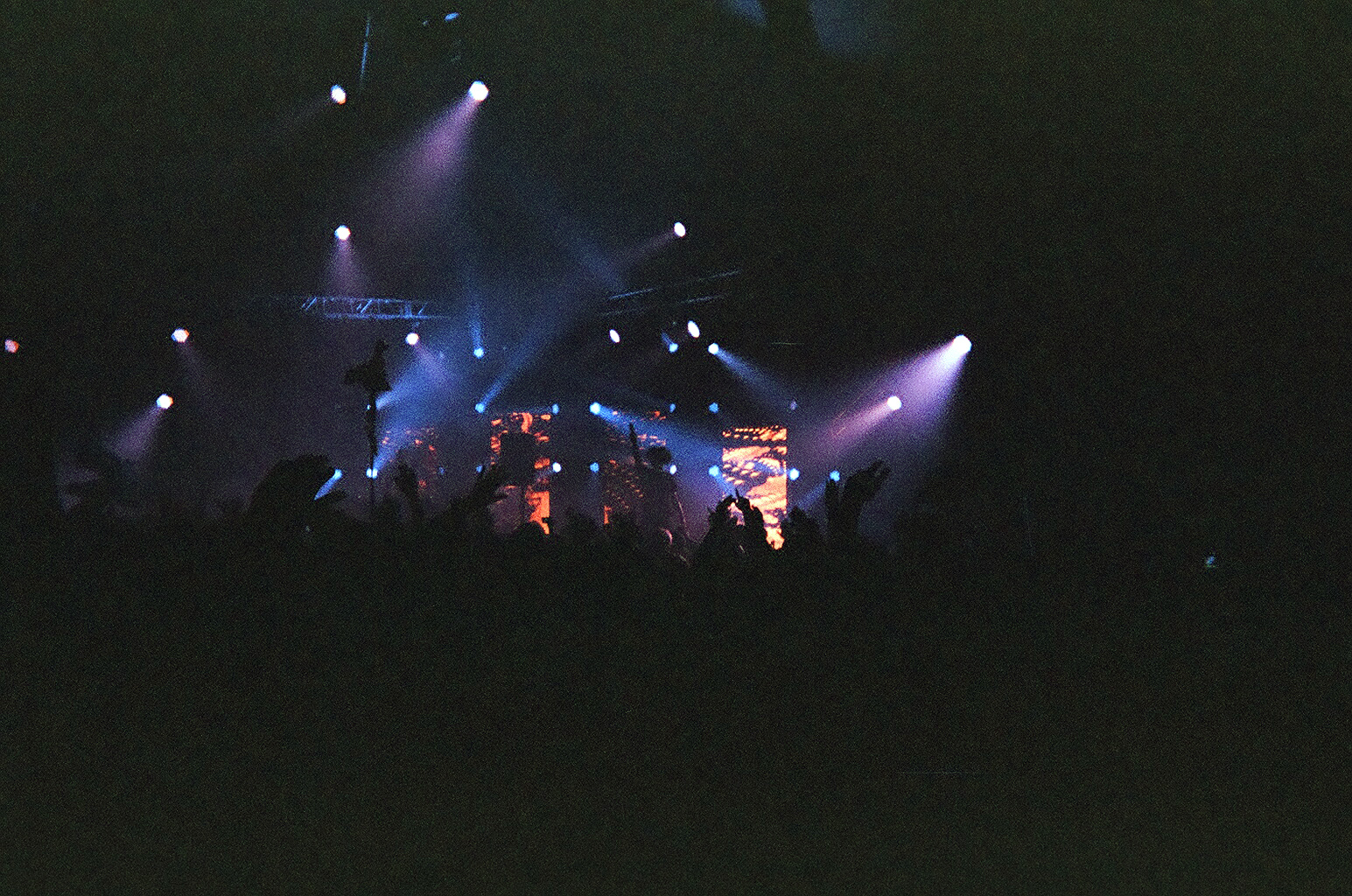
- NERO performing at Camp Bisco X in Mariaville Lake, New York, 2011
- Studio albums: 3
- Singles: 28
- Music videos: 9

The discography of Nero, a British electronic music act, consists of three studio albums and twenty-eight singles.

The trio, Daniel Stephens, Joseph Ray and Alana Watson, released their first official single "Innocence" in the United Kingdom on 26 April 2010. The single was released as a double A-side with the track "Electron". The track peaked at number 167 on the UK Singles Chart. On 6 December 2010, Nero were nominated for the BBC's Sound of 2011 poll.

The nomination was followed by the addition of their second official single "Me & You". The single was released in the UK on 2 January 2011, where it debuted at number 15 on the UK Singles Chart. The trio's third single, "Guilt" made its premiere when Zane Lowe selected it as his Hottest Record in the World on 22 February 2011. The single was released on 24 April 2011, debuting at number 8 in the UK.

"Promises" made its debut on 17 May 2011, when Zane Lowe named it Hottest Record in the World—the third consecutive single from the group to achieve this feat. On 14 August 2011, "Promises" debuted at number 1 in the UK. The London trio's debut album Welcome Reality was released on 15 August 2011, and reached number 1 on the UK Albums Chart. The album's release was later followed with the single "Crush on You" on 13 October 2011. It charted at 32 on the UK Singles Chart. Nero also released "Reaching Out" as a single on 18 December 2011. The last single from the album was "Must Be the Feeling".

Their second studio album Between II Worlds was released on 11 September 2015. The album was preceded by the release of three singles: "Satisfy" in 2014, "The Thrill" in 2015 and "Two Minds" in 2015.

== Studio albums ==
List of albums, with selected chart positions and certifications
Title	Details	Peak chart positions									Sales	Certifications
Title	Details	UK	UK Dance	AUS	BEL	IRL	NZ	SCO	SWI	US Dance	Sales	Certifications
Welcome Reality	Released: 12 August 2011; Label: MTA; Formats: CD, digital download	1	1	12	29	52	32	2	88	6	US: 120,000	BPI: Gold; ARIA: Gold
Between II Worlds	Released: 11 September 2015; Label: MTA; Formats: CD, digital download	24	2	13	88	—	37	—	—	1		
Into the Unknown	Released: 6 September 2024; Label: 2808; Formats: TBA	—	—	—	—	—	—	—	—	—		
"—" denotes releases that did not chart

== Extended plays ==
List of extended plays
Title	Details
Requiem	Released: 10 May 2006; Label: Formation; Formats: CD, digital download

== Singles ==
List of singles, with selected chart positions and certifications, showing year released and album name
Title	Year	Peak chart positions										Certifications	Album
Title	Year	UK	AUS	AUT	BEL	FRA	GER	NZ	SCO	SWI	US	Certifications	Album
"Ragga Puffin / Torture"	2005	—	—	—	—	—	—	—	—	—	—		non-album singles
"Act Like You Know"	2005	—	—	—	—	—	—	—	—	—	—		non-album singles
"Dick Tracy VIP / The Forecast"	2007	—	—	—	—	—	—	—	—	—	—		non-album singles
"Energy / Workout"	2007	—	—	—	—	—	—	—	—	—	—		non-album singles
"This Way / Bad Trip"	2008	—	—	—	—	—	—	—	—	—	—		Welcome Reality (Deluxe)
"Something Else / Night Thunder"	2008	—	—	—	—	—	—	—	—	—	—		Non-album single
"Solid Air / Choices"	2008	—	—	—	—	—	—	—	—	—	—		Welcome Reality (Deluxe)
"End of the World / Go Back"	2009	—	—	—	—	—	—	—	—	—	—		non-album singles
"Act Like You Know / Sound in Motion"	2009	—	—	—	—	—	—	—	—	—	—		non-album singles
"Bad Trip" (The Remixes)	2009	—	—	—	—	—	—	—	—	—	—		non-album singles
"Innocence / Electron"	2010	167	—	—	—	—	—	—	—	—	—		Welcome Reality
"Me & You"	2011	15	—	—	56	—	—	—	23	—	—	BPI: Silver	Welcome Reality
"Guilt"	2011	8	62	—	55	—	—	—	11	—	—	BPI: Silver	Welcome Reality
"Promises"	2011	1	33	28	27	61	67	26	1	34	70	BPI: Gold; ARIA: Platinum; RIAA: Gold; RMNZ: Gold	Welcome Reality
"Crush on You"	2011	32	—	—	48	—	—	—	28	—	—		Welcome Reality
"Reaching Out"	2011	92	—	—	78	—	—	—	—	—	—		Welcome Reality
"Must Be the Feeling"	2012	124	—	—	56	—	—	—	—	—	—		Welcome Reality
"Won't You (Be There)"	2012	156	—	—	130	—	—	—	—	—	—		Welcome Reality +
"Satisfy"	2014	50	59	—	—	—	—	—	—	—	—		Between II Worlds
"The Thrill"	2015	—	75	—	—	—	—	—	—	—	—		Between II Worlds
"Two Minds"	2015	27	—	—	127	—	—	—	—	—	—		Between II Worlds
"Into the Night"	2015	—	—	—	—	—	—	—	—	—	—		Between II Worlds
"Lullaby"	2018	—	—	—	—	—	—	—	—	—	—		Ninjawerks Volume 1
"Renegade" (with RL Grime)	2022	—	—	—	—	—	—	—	—	—	—		Non-album single
"Truth"	2023	—	—	—	—	—	—	—	—	—	—		Into the Unknown
"Blame You"	2024	—	—	—	—	—	—	—	—	—	—		Into the Unknown
"Draw Energy"	2024	—	—	—	—	—	—	—	—	—	—		Into the Unknown
"Too Many Questions"	2024	—	—	—	—	—	—	—	—	—	—		Into the Unknown
"Solar"	2024	—	—	—	—	—	—	—	—	—	—		Into the Unknown
"Innoncence (2025)" (with Taiki Nulight)	2025	—	—	—	—	—	—	—	—	—	—		Non-album single
"Destruction"	2025	—	—	—	—	—	—	—	—	—	—		Non-album single
"—" denotes a recording that did not chart or was not released in that territory.

== Remixes ==
Track	Year	Artist	Release
"Let It Go"	2005	DJ SS	S Files
"Shine"	2007	Influx UK	Shine / Special Black
"Hypercaine"	2009	DJ Fresh	Hypercaine
"After I'm Gone"	2009	Greenlaw featuring DJ SS	After I'm Gone
"Say It"	2009	Booty Luv	Say It
"Juggernauts"	2009	Enter Shikari	Juggernauts
"Ghosts 'n' Stuff"	2009	deadmau5 featuring Rob Swire	Ghosts 'n' Stuff
"I'm Not Your Toy"	2009	La Roux	I'm Not Your Toy
"Blinded by the Lights"	2009	The Streets	Blinded by the Lights / In the Middle
"In the Middle"	2009	The Streets	Blinded by the Lights / In the Middle
"Shaolin Style"	2009	Bar 9	Shaolin Style
"Trippin'"	2009	Platnum	Nero Remixes 12"
"Everybody"	2009	Rudenko	Nero Remixes 12"
"Sincere"	2010	MJ Cole	Sincere (Nero Remix)
"You Used to Hold Me"	2010	Calvin Harris	You Used to Hold Me
"The Recluse"	2010	Plan B	The Recluse
"Hot-n-Fun"	2010	N.E.R.D featuring Nelly Furtado	Hot-n-Fun
"Let You Go"	2010	Chase & Status	Let You Go
"Feel So Close"	2011	Calvin Harris	Feel So Close
"Promises" (with Skrillex)	2011	Nero	Promises
"C.T.F.O"	2011	SebastiAn featuring M.I.A.	C.T.F.O
"Hypnotize U"	2011	N.E.R.D featuring Daft Punk	Hypnotize U
"Guilt" (Nero VIP Mix)	2011	Nero	Guilt
"Stress" (Nero Remix)	2011	Justice	
"Syndicate Theme"	2011	SyndicateGame	
"Must Be the Feeling" (with Flux Pavilion)	2012	Nero	Must Be the Feeling
"Fok Julle Naaiers" (Nero bootleg)	2012	Die Antwoord	released on SoundCloud
"Speed Demon"	2012	Michael Jackson	Bad 25
"Holdin' On" (with Skrillex)	2012	I See Monstas	Monsta
"House Every Weekend"	2015	David Zowie	
"Emotion" (Nero Edit)	2021	Daft Punk	
"No Rival!"	2021	Lazou Mizik & Joseph Ray	No Rival (NERO Remix)
"XYZ"	2022	deadmau5	XYZ (NERO Remix)

=== Production credits ===
Track	Year	Artist	Album
"Stay Awake"	2011	Example	Playing in the Shadows
"Follow Me"	2012	Muse	The 2nd Law
"Sideways"	2022	Example	We May Grow Old But We Never Grow Up

=== Other appearances ===
Track	Year	Other artist(s)	Appears on
"Into the Past"	2013	—N/a	The Great Gatsby: Music from Baz Luhrmann's Film
"Dreams"	2017	Zhu	stardustexhalemarrakechdreams EP
