= Two Minds =

Single by Nero

from the album Between II Worlds
- Released: 21 August 2015
- Genre: Future house
- Length: 3:34
- Label: MTA; Mercury
- Songwriter(s): Daniel Stephens; Joseph Ray; Alana Watson
- Producer(s): Daniel Stephens; Joseph Ray

Nero singles chronology
"The Thrill" (2015)	"Two Minds" (2015)	"Into the Night" (2016)

"Two Minds" is a single by British electronic music trio Nero. It was released on 21 August 2015 as the third single from their second studio album, Between II Worlds.

== Music video ==
The music video premiered on YouTube and Vevo on 4 August 2015. It was directed by Greg Jardin, who is known for other works including his short film "Floating".

The video begins with view of a lit up city, and singer Alana Watson beginning the lyrics. A static white noise figure climbs out of a television and begins walking through the city, encountering a homeless man and breakdancers who are puzzled by her appearance and shocked by her when they try to touch her. A young man (Juan Trueba) is walking through the city and encounters this static person. Briefly, faces flash across the static figure before three figures in trench coats appear and shoot the static person with some kind of energy gun. A chase sequence begins as the static figure flees to avoid capture.

As the young man keeps searching the city, he meets the static person again in an alleyway. When they approach each other, we are given quick flashbacks that reveal who this static person used to be: a girl with extraordinary powers played by New Hologram who had a romantic relationship with him before she was captured by the men in the trench coats.

Back in the present, the man reaches out to touch her, but she raises her arms in protest, not wanting to hurt him. The men appear again and shoot the static girl down. She begins to flicker away weakly, and the young man makes a hasty decision to kiss her. They merge into one giant static figure who looms over city and disappears into a giant screen as Alana Watson finishes singing.

== Track listing ==
Digital download – single
No.	Title	Length
1.	"Two Minds"	3:34

Digital download – EP
No.	Title	Length
1.	"Two Minds" (Nero '92 Minds remix)	3:48
2.	"Two Minds" (Dimension remix)	4:57
3.	"Two Minds" (David Zowie remix)	5:03
4.	"Two Minds" (FineArt remix)	6:05

== Charts ==
Chart (2015)	Peak position
Scotland (OCC)	12
UK Dance (OCC)	9
UK Singles (OCC)	27
US Dance Club Songs (Billboard)	30
