= Act Like You Know (disambiguation) =

Act Like You Know is a 1991 album by MC Lyte.

Act Like You Know may also refer to:

== Albums ==
- Act Like You Know, a 2007 album by Gal Level

== Songs ==
- "Act Like You Know", a song by MC Lyte from the album Act Like You Know, 1991
- "Act Like You Know", a song by Pete Rock & CL Smooth from the album Mecca and the Soul Brother, 1992
- "Act Like You Know", a song by Dizzee Rascal from the album E3 AF, 2020
- "Act Like You Know", a 1982 song by Fat Larry's Band
- "Act Like You Know", a 2005 song by Nero
