= What I Might Do =

Single by Ben Pearce
- Released: 24 September 2012 (EP); 26 March 2013 (single); 14 October 2013 (re-release)
- Recorded: 2012
- Genre: Deep house
- Length: 3:15 (Radio Edit); 6:29 (Club Mix)
- Label: MTA Records, Mercury Records
- Songwriters: Diedra Artis, Anthony Hamilton, James Poyser
- Producer: Ben Pearce

Music video
- "What I Might Do" on YouTube

"What I Might Do" is the debut single of Manchester-based English DJ/producer Ben Pearce. It was released by MTA Records on 11 October 2012, under exclusive licence from Under the Shade Records. The song is considered as an example of deep house music and is influenced by blues and soul. It samples the Anthony Hamilton song "Cornbread, Fish & Collard Greens". It was nominated as "Essential New Tune" by Pete Tong on BBC Radio 1. The song rose to fame in September 2013 after being featured on a Tesco F&F television advertisement, so far peaking at number seven on the UK Singles Chart. It has also charted in Belgium, Italy and the Netherlands. After its charting in September 2013, the single was re-released alongside new remixes on 14 October 2013.

== Music videos ==
The original official music video, directed by You Ness and produced by Faye Adams, was shot around London in September 2012 and released in November 2012. It stars Rhian Chambers and Sean McPherson. A second video was released in October 2013 to coincide with the re-release of the single.

== Track listings ==
Digital download - single
No.	Title	Length
1.	"What I Might Do" (radio edit)	3:15

Digital download - EP
No.	Title	Length
1.	"What I Might Do" (Now That's What I Call Music! 86 edit)	2:28
2.	"What I Might Do" (club mix)	6:29
3.	"What I Might Do" (Harry Wolfman remix)	8:00
4.	"What I Might Do" (Adam Shelton remix)	8:23
5.	"What I Might Do" (Bonar Bradberry remix)	6:35

Digital download - re-release EP
No.	Title	Length
1.	"What I Might Do" (radio edit)	3:15
2.	"What I Might Do" (Karma Kid remix)	5:54
3.	"What I Might Do" (Kilter remix)	5:09
4.	"What I Might Do" (Kolombo remix)	7:37

Digital download - Remixes (2013)
No.	Title	Length
1.	"What I Might Do" (Kolombo remix)	7:37
2.	"What I Might Do" (Simion remix)	6:59

Digital download - Remixes (2013)
No.	Title	Length
1.	"What I Might Do" (Milk & Sugar remix)	7:18

Digital download - Remixes (2014)
No.	Title	Length
1.	"What I Might Do" (Simion dub)	6:14

== Chart performance ==
=== Weekly charts ===
Weekly chart performance for "What I Might Do"
Chart (2012–13)	Peak position
Belgium (Ultratop 50 Flanders)	15
Belgium (Ultratip Bubbling Under Wallonia)	30
Italy (FIMI)	3
Hungary (Rádiós Top 40)	38
Hungary (Single Top 40)	10
Ireland (IRMA)	38
Netherlands (Single Top 100)	40
Scotland Singles (Official Charts)	10
UK Dance (Official Charts)	2
UK Singles (Official Charts)	7

=== Year-end charts ===
Annual chart rankings for "What I Might Do"
Chart (2013)	Position
Italy (FIMI)	29
UK Singles (OCC)	83

== Certifications ==
Region	Certification	Certified units/sales
United Kingdom (BPI)	Platinum	600,000^{‡}
^{‡} Sales+streaming figures based on certification alone.
