= Crush on You (Nero song) =

Single by Nero

from the album Welcome Reality
- Released: 13 October 2011
- Recorded: 2011
- Genre: Dubstep
- Length: 4:10
- Label: MTA; Mercury
- Songwriter(s): Daniel Stephens; Joseph Ray; Alana Watson; Jerry Knight; Aaron Zigman
- Producer(s): Nero

Nero singles chronology
"Promises" (2011)	"Crush on You" (2011)	"Reaching Out" (2011)

"Crush on You" is a song by British dubstep trio Nero that appears on their debut studio album, Welcome Reality. It was released as the fifth single from the album on 13 October 2011. The song peaked at number 32 on the UK Singles Chart and number seven on the UK Dance Chart. It heavily samples and features lyrics from The Jets' song "Crush on You".

== Music video ==
A music video to accompany the release of "Crush on You" was uploaded to YouTube on 30 September 2011 at a total length of three minutes and fourteen seconds. It is an homage to the 1977 Japanese film, House, which had been re-released in the United States in 2009 and found a wider audience. Much of the iconography of the music video is taken directly from the film.

The video begins with scenes of a teenage schoolboy romancing four teenage schoolgirls on what is the old Brunel University Runnymede campus in Egham. The four girls are then seen together singing along to a karaoke track of the song in a dorm room followed by a scene where they, along with other girls, dance in a circle in a field while wearing white nightgowns.

The video then takes a darker tone, as lightning strikes the dormitory and the four girls writhe on the floor. The next few scenes show the girls as crying, disoriented and even possessed (at least one of the girls' eyes glow red) and scenes of the girls being romanced by the boy are interspersed with scenes of him running through the school grounds, looking over his shoulder.

The girls are then shown waking up in the field, looking disoriented and frightened and running off. As the video continues, it is revealed that the girls cast a spell on the boy in front of a love shrine in the dorm room and after dancing in the field. The girls are also seen terrorizing the boy in a cemetery in a later scene.

The last several scenes feature the girls alone in horrific or odd situations. Two of the girls appear as laughing, disembodied heads, one girl lies motionless in an asphalt parking lot, one girl appears dressed as a ghostly Japanese bride, one girl appears to have hanged herself (a pair of feet dangle motionless in frame) and one girl stands next to a window as a bloody hand slams into the glass.

The video ends with the boy fully clothed and unconscious on a dorm room bed, with his book bag under his arm. Each of the four original girls appear separately and sing into his ear that they have a crush on him. After the last girl disappears, the door to the dorm room closes on the camera with the boy still unconscious in the bed.

== Track listing ==
Digital download
No.	Title	Length
1.	"Crush on You"	2:48
2.	"Crush on You" (Knife Party remix)	4:26
3.	"Crush on You" (Brodinski remix)	4:35
4.	"Crush on You" (KillSonik remix)	4:54

Album version
No.	Title	Length
1.	"Crush on You"	4:10

== Credits and personnel ==
- Lead vocals are sampled from The Jets song "Crush on You"
- Producers – Nero
- Lyrics – Daniel Stephens, Joseph Ray, Alana Watson

== Chart performance ==
Chart (2011)	Peak position
Belgium (Ultratop 50 Flanders)	48
Scotland (OCC)	40
UK Dance (OCC)	6
UK Singles (OCC)	32

== Release history ==
Region	Date	Format	Label
Ireland	13 October 2011	Digital download	MTA; Mercury
United Kingdom	16 October 2011	Digital download	MTA; Mercury
