= TCTS =

English DJ and record producer

- Born: Samuel David O'Neill; 1993 (age 32–33)
- Origin: Manchester, England
- Genres: House
- Occupations: DJ; record producer
- Instruments: Keyboard
- Years active: 2011–present
- Labels: MTA (2014–present); Greco-Roman (2013–14); Just Us (2012); Cool Kid (2012)
- Website: Official Soundcloud

Samuel David O'Neill, known by his stage name TCTS, is an English DJ and record producer from Manchester. He is signed to Chase & Status' record label, MTA. O'Neill is best known for his 2014 song "Games", which reached number 29 on the UK Dance Chart.

== Career ==
TCTS' debut EP, Hands, was released on 15 May 2012 through Cool Kid Music. He released a single, "1997", through Bondax's label Just Us on 10 September 2012. The signing came about after he submitted the song to Rob Adcock's BBC Introducing from Stoke radio show and Bondax heard it played on Huw Stephens' BBC Radio 1 show. His second EP, These Heights, was released on 11 November 2013 through Greco-Roman. Pitchfork's Larry Fitzmaurice described the release as "warm and weird".

His third EP, "Games", was released through MTA Records on 8 July 2014. The title track features vocals from KStewart, the sister of Example's ex-band-member David Stewart. Earmilk described the song as "a choppy synth-driven production with bouncy dance floor appeal". It entered the UK Singles Chart at number 117. Stereogum described "You", a promotional single from the EP, as "an effervescent house cut built around melancholy piano, rubbery synths, and an assured yet emotionally wrecked vocal". His next EP, Body, was released on 29 March 2015 and was preceded by its promotional singles "Thinking About You" and "Coupe de Ville".

O'Neill has received extensive airplay on BBC Radio 1Xtra, received support from Huw Stephens, Annie Mac and Rob da Bank's BBC Radio 1 shows and also appeared for a guest mix on Triple J.

== Discography ==
=== Extended plays ===
Title	Details	Track listing
These Heights	Released: 11 November 2013; Label: Greco-Roman; Formats: Digital download	"These Heights" (featuring Shivum Sharma); "Over" (featuring Holly Partridge); "Lose Control"; "Do It Alright"
These Heights (Remixes)	Released: 13 January 2014; Label: Greco-Roman; Formats: Digital download	"These Heights" (featuring Shivum Sharma) (Greco-Roman Soundsystem Remix); "These Heights" (featuring Shivum Sharma) (Detroit Swindle Mile High Club Remix); "These Heights" (featuring Shivum Sharma) (Kry Wolf Remix)
Games	Released: 8 July 2014; Label: MTA Records; Formats: Digital download	"Games" (featuring K. Stewart); "You" (featuring Sam Sure); "Trust"; "Forward"
Games (Remixes)	Released: 19 August 2014; Label: MTA Records; Formats: Digital download	"Games" (featuring K. Stewart) (Doc Daneeka Remix); "Games" (featuring K. Stewart) (TIEKS Remix); "Games" (featuring K. Stewart) (Josh Butler Remix)
Body	Released: 29 March 2015; Label: MTA Records; Formats: Digital download	"Thinking About You" (featuring Leo Kalyan); "Coupe de Ville" (featuring Aniff Akinola); "For Life"; "House Lights On"; "Thinking About You" (featuring Leo Kalyan) (Booka Shade Remix); "Thinking About You" (featuring Leo Kalyan) (Few Nolder Remix)

=== Singles ===
Year	Single	Peak chart positions		Album
Year	Single	UK Singles	UK Dance	Album
2012	"1997"	—	—	Non-album single
2014	"Games" (featuring K. Stewart)	117	29	Games EP
2015	"Thinking About You" (featuring Leo Kalyan)	—	—	Non-album singles
2016	"Jelly"	—	—	Non-album singles
2016	"Live for Something"	—	—	Non-album singles
2016	"Icy Feet"	—	—	Non-album singles
2017	"Do It Like Me (Icy Feet)" (featuring Sage the Gemini and Kelis)	—	39	Non-album singles
2017	"Slow Motion" (with The Magician featuring Sam Sure)	—	—	Non-album singles
2019	"Back to Me" (with The Aston Shuffle featuring Blush'ko)	—	—	Non-album singles
2023	"Take It Back"	—	—	Non-album singles
2023	"Never Know"	—	—	Non-album singles
2023	"Better" (with Decades)	—	—	Non-album singles
2023	"Tearing Up My Heart" (with Sophia Quinn)	—	—	Non-album singles
2023	"Say No More" (featuring Ellenor)	—	—	Non-album singles
2024	"Push Me" (with Manyfew)	—	—	Non-album singles
2024	"Amnesia" (with Ekko and Hyzteria)	—	—	Non-album singles
2024	"Losing My Mind" (with Hayley May)	—	—	Non-album singles
2024	"Take Me Home" (with Nu Aspect and RAHH)	—	—	Non-album singles
2024	"Dance Away" (with GotSome and Raphi)	—	—	Non-album singles
2024	"Desire"	—	—	Non-album singles
2024	"Favourite"	—	—	Non-album singles
2024	"US" (with Marshall Jefferson and Byron Stingily)	—	—	Non-album singles
2024	"Sarge"	—	—	Non-album singles
2024	"Paperwork" (with Audio Bullys)	—	—	Non-album singles
2025	"Take Me (Favourite Place)"	—	—	Non-album singles
2025	"Masquerade" (with Jem Cooke)	—	—	Non-album singles
2025	"Masquerade" (with Hayley May)	—	—	Non-album singles
2025	"Waves"	—	—	Non-album singles
"—" denotes a single that did not chart or was not released.

=== Remixes ===
Year	Song	Artist
2013	"Here"	Syron
2013	"Bind Me"	ETML
2013	"On & On"	Snakehips
2013	"Forever"	Haim
2013	"Alive"	Chase & Status featuring Jacob Banks
2013	"Dance Floor"	SLOWOLF featuring Raekwon
2014	"Freeze"	Moko
2014	"Flicker"	Shivum Sharma
2014	"Gangsters"	Lolo featuring Giggs
2014	"Somebody New"	Jakwob featuring Tiffani Juno
2014	"Half Light"	Wilkinson featuring Tom Cane
2014	"All I See"	Bondax featuring Tanya Lacey
2014	"Mother & Father"	Broods
2014	"Go Deep"	Jax Jones
2014	"If I Go"	Ella Eyre
2014	"Everything for a Reason"	TC
2015	"Champagne Kisses"	Jessie Ware
2015	"King"	Years & Years
2015	"All My Love"	Watermät, Becky Hill & TAI
2015	"The Thrill"	Nero
2015	"Body Talk"	Foxes
2016	"The Vibe"	Motez (producer) featuring Scrufizzer
2017	"Golden"	SAINT WKND featuring Hoodlem
2017	"In Your Arms"	Crystal Fighters
2017	"Kryptonite"	George Maple featuring Jevon
2017	"Gassed"	WESLEE
2017	"Breathe"	Astrid S
2017	"Window Seat"	Fuse ODG
2017	"My Love"	Wale featuring Major Lazer, Wizkid and Dua Lipa
2017	"Either Way"	Snakehips & Anne-Marie featuring Joey Bada$$
2017	"Jealousy"	Disciples
2018	"Mistakes"	Basenji featuring Tkay Maidza
2018	"On You"	Michael Calfan
2018	"Inhale"	Duke Dumont featuring Ebenezer
2018	"Don't Wreck My Holiday"	Black Saint featuring Kelli-Leigh
2018	"Falls"	ODESZA featuring Sasha Sloan
2021	"Remember"	Becky Hill and David Guetta
