= Satisfy (song) =

Single by Nero

from the album Between II Worlds
- Released: 14 May 2014
- Genre: Big beat; EDM
- Length: 4:04
- Label: MTA; Mercury
- Songwriters: Daniel Stephens; Joseph Ray; Alana Watson
- Producers: Daniel Stephens; Joseph Ray

Nero singles chronology
"Won't You (Be There)" (2012)	"Satisfy" (2014)	"The Thrill" (2015)

"Satisfy" is a song by British electronic music trio Nero. It was released on 14 May 2014 as the lead single from Nero's second studio album, Between II Worlds. It peaked at number 50 on the UK Singles Chart. The song was featured in the soundtrack of Forza Horizon 2 in Horizon Bass Arena

== Background and release ==
Nero began the campaign for their second studio album in November 2013, announcing it by posting an ambient piece looped for a duration of 28:08 on their SoundCloud.

On 13 May 2014, the song premiered on BBC Radio 1 as Zane Lowe's Hottest Record in the World. It was released to digital retailers the following day.

== Remixes and cover versions ==
Unofficial remixes of the song by a number of high-profile artists in the drum and bass scene have emerged since the song's release. TC and Koncept, as well as RAM Records artists LoKo and Audio have all created bootlegs of the song. These have received airplay on BBC Radio 1, 1Xtra and Rinse FM.

== Charts ==
Weekly chart performance for "Satisfy"
Chart (2014)	Peak position
Australia (ARIA)	59
UK Singles (OCC)	50
UK Dance (OCC)	13
