= Between II Worlds =

Studio album by Nero
- Released: 11 September 2015
- Recorded: 23 April 2013 – 19 March 2015
- Studios: Studio 2808 Tileyard Studios, Kings Cross, London
- Genres: Electro house; electronic rock; drum and bass; dubstep
- Length: 53:09
- Labels: MTA; Virgin EMI; Interscope
- Producers: Daniel Stephens; Joseph Ray

Nero chronology
Welcome Reality (2011)	Between II Worlds (2015)	Into The Unknown (2024)

Singles from Between II Worlds
- 1. "Satisfy" Released: 13 May 2014; 2. "The Thrill" Released: 20 March 2015; 3. "Two Minds" Released: 21 August 2015; 4. "Into the Night" Released: 8 January 2016

Between II Worlds is the second studio album by the British electronic music group Nero. Like its predecessor Welcome Reality, the album is a concept album and was released on 11 September 2015 by Virgin EMI, MTA and Interscope Records.

== Background and release ==
Nero began the campaign for their second studio album in November 2013, announcing it by posting an ambient piece looped for a duration of 28:08 on their SoundCloud.

In February 2015, the band's record label, MTA Records, posted a picture of a tweet by Stuart Hawkes stating that he had just started mastering the new album by Nero. On 19 March 2015, Nero announced they had finished the album, and premiered its second single, "The Thrill".

On 10 April, it was announced that the album would be called Between II Worlds and it would be released on 28 August 2015 (coinciding with their recurring use of the number '2808') but the release date was later delayed to 11 September. The album was made available to pre-order on the same day, with "Satisfy" and the title track offered as an instant download for those who pre-ordered a copy (thus being a promotional single.) The album features a reworked version of "Into the Past", from The Great Gatsby soundtrack.

Over the weekend of 24 May 2015, Nero launched the promotional single "Dark Skies" on Spotify. The only way to listen to the stream was to add the album Between II Worlds to one's playlist and the track would then reveal itself. Though the song has previously been played at many live events, it had not been released until this date.

== Singles ==
"Satisfy" was released as the lead single on 13 May 2014 and did not receive a music video or much promotion.

"The Thrill" was then released as the second single on 20 March 2015. A music video for the track was released on 7 May 2015.

"Two Minds" was released as the third single from Between II Worlds on 21 August 2015. It signified a more pop orientated sound for the trio which had not been seen in their previous works. A music video for the song was released on 4 August 2015. It was directed by Greg Jardin. The song's intro was increased in length for the video only.

"Into the Night" was released as the fourth single from Between II Worlds on 8 January 2016. An animated music video was released for the single on 30 November 2015. It featured animation by Red Knuckles. It was directed by Markus Lundqvist & Dan Stephens, the latter being a member of Nero. The song was shortened for the video.

== Commercial performance ==
On the week ending 3 October 2015, Between II Worlds peaked at number one on the Billboard Top Dance/Electronic Albums chart.

== Track listing ==
Digital download and CD
No.	Title	Writer(s)	Producer(s)	Length
1.	"Circles"	Daniel Stephens, Joseph Ray, Alana Watson	Stephens, Ray, Paul Hicks^{[a]}	4:31
2.	"The Thrill"	Stephens, Ray, Watson	Stephens, Ray, Paul Hicks^{[a]}	3:30
3.	"It Comes and It Goes"	Stephens, Ray, Watson	Stephens, Ray	4:02
4.	"Two Minds"	Stephens, Ray, Watson	Stephens, Ray	3:34
5.	"What Does Love Mean"	Stephens, Ray, Watson	Stephens, Ray	4:09
6.	"Between II Worlds"	Stephens, Ray	Stephens, Ray	7:20
7.	"Into the Night"	Stephens, Ray, Watson	Stephens, Ray	5:12
8.	"Satisfy"	Stephens, Ray, Watson	Stephens, Ray	4:03
9.	"Dark Skies"	Stephens, Ray, Watson	Stephens, Ray	4:01
10.	"Into the Past (Reboot)"	Stephens, Ray, Watson, Craig Armstrong	Stephens, Ray	4:14
11.	"Tonight"	Stephens, Ray, Watson	Stephens, Ray, Saul Milton^{[a]}	3:40
12.	"Wasted"	Stephens, Ray, Watson	Stephens, Ray	4:53
Total length:				53:09

Notes

- ^{^[a]} signifies an additional producer

== Personnel ==
Credits are adapted from the CD booklet.

- Daniel Stephens – production, lead vocals (track 7), mastering, writing, studio engineer
- Joseph Ray – production, mastering, writing, studio engineer
- Alana Watson – lead vocals (except track 6), writer
- Paul Hicks – additional production (tracks 1 and 2)
- Stuart Hawkes – mastering (tracks 5, 6, 10, and 12)
- Rob Macfarlane – studio engineer (track 6, 9)
- Michael Koltes – voice over (track 6)
- Craig Armstrong – writer (track 10)
- Saul Milton – additional production, programming

== Charts ==
Weekly chart performance for Between II Worlds
Chart (2015)	Peak position
Australian Albums (ARIA)	13
Belgian Albums (Ultratop Flanders)	102
Belgian Albums (Ultratop Wallonia)	88
New Zealand Albums (RMNZ)	37
Scottish Albums (Official Charts)	44
UK Albums (Official Charts)	24
UK Dance Albums (Official Charts)	2
US Billboard 200	73
US Top Dance Albums (Billboard)	1
