= Me and You (Nero song) =

Single by Nero

from the album Welcome Reality
- B-side: "Welcome Reality"
- Released: 2 January 2011
- Recorded: 2010
- Genre: Dubstep; drum and bass; electronic rock
- Length: 3:55
- Label: MTA; Mercury
- Songwriters: Daniel Stephens; Joe Ray; Alana Watson
- Producer: Nero

Nero singles chronology
""Innocence/ Electron"" (2010)	"Me and You" (2011)	"Guilt" (2011)

"Me and You" is a song by British dubstep trio Nero that appears on their debut studio album, Welcome Reality. It was released in the United Kingdom as a digital download on 2 January 2011, with a 12" vinyl available the following day. On 8 January 2011, the single debuted at number 15 on the UK Singles Chart, also managing to top the UK Indie Chart.

Despite its name, the single's B-side track "Welcome Reality" is not included on the album of the same name, although a VIP mix of the song can be found in the iTunes deluxe version of the album.

== Critical reception ==
Nick Levin of Digital Spy gave the song a positive review stating:

This breakthrough smash is indeed an almighty racket. But it is the very best kind of almighty racket, a swaggering synthesis of beats, power chords, stadium keyboard hooks, crowd noise and vocals from the lungularly-blessed Alana that sounds like the sort of thing David Haye might hear in his head as he struts into the ring. Memo to Emily Eavis: book this lot for Glasto now… but remember to buy the poor cows some ear muffs first!.

== Chart performance ==
"Me and You" debuted on the UK Singles Chart on 9 January 2011 at number 15; marking that week's highest new entry. The single also debuted at the number-one spot on the independent releases chart, knocking Adele's "Make You Feel My Love" from her eight-week reign. The following week, the single remained at number 15; although losing its number-one place on the independent releases chart to Adele; who once again returned to the peak. The single also qualified for the dance chart on 16 January 2011; debuting at number 3. On 23 January 2011, the single fell 7 places to number 22 and fell a further 4 places to number 26 the following week; marking its fourth week within the top 40.

== Music video ==
A music video to accompany the release of "Me and You" was first posted onto YouTube on 5 December 2010. The video begins with a teenage boy entering a video game arcade and playing a driving game, followed by a shooting game. During his game, Nero walk past before exiting out a back door; grabbing the boy's curiosity. The boy follows, leading him down a deserted corridor; where he finds a room. Entering the room, the boy discovers an arcade game entitled 'Nero' and after following the instructions to insert credit; begins his game playing as Joe to the backing track "Me and You". The game, very much similar to Streets of Rage 3 and Outrun 2019, shuts down during the boy's playing, who after searching, discovers the plug has been removed and places it back in. Continuing the game, the boy comes to a conclusion when the characters Joe and Dan come across a young boy playing an arcade game. As of January 2018, the music video has received over 12 million views.

== In popular culture ==
The single was selected as Zane Lowe's Hottest Record in the World on 28 September 2010. BBC Radio 1 DJs Nick Grimshaw and Annie Mac also selected "Me and You" to be their Weekend Anthem during December 2010. It also featured in the Sky Sports September advert. The Dirtyphonics remix was on the soundtrack of video games such as Dirt: Showdown, Forza Horizon (on the 'Bass Arena' radio station), and in a Gran Turismo 5 trailer for the debut of the 2015 Acura NSX then was later featured in the official track list of Gran Turismo 6. The song was used as the walk out song for the 2011–12 season of the Hyundai A-League.

== Track listing ==
Digital download
No.	Title	Length
1.	"Me & You"	3:55
2.	"Welcome Reality"	4:28
3.	"Me & You" (Dirtyphonics remix)	5:56
4.	"Me & You" (Danger remix)	3:27
5.	"Me & You" (Kamuki remix)	4:48

Digital download (United States)
No.	Title	Length
1.	"Me & You"	3:55
2.	"Me & You" (Steve Angello remix)	6:25
3.	"Promises" (Skrillex and Nero remix)	4:28

12" vinyl
No.	Title	Length
1.	"Me & You"	3:55
2.	"Welcome Reality"	4:28

== Charts ==
Chart (2011)	Peak position
Belgium (Ultratip Bubbling Under Flanders)	6
Scottish Singles Sales (Official Charts)	23
UK Dance (Official Charts)	3
UK Indie (Official Charts)	1
UK Singles (Official Charts)	15

=== Year-end charts ===
Year-end chart performance for "Me and You"
Chart (2011)	Position
UK Singles (OCC)	126

== Release history ==
Region	Date	Format	Label
United Kingdom	2 January 2011	Digital download	MTA; Mercury
United Kingdom	3 January 2011	Vinyl	MTA; Mercury

== See also ==
- List of UK top 10 singles in 2011
- List of UK Independent Singles Chart number ones of 2011
