= Ben Pearce =

- Born: 28 November 1989 (age 36); Manchester, England
- Genres: Electronic, house, deep house
- Occupations: Producer, DJ, remixer
- Years active: 2012–present
- Label: Astralwerks

Ben Pearce is an English DJ and music producer. He co-founded the record label and DJ agency Purp & Soul with Chris Farnworth and heads as the Creative Director. Ben Pearce's music is considered deep house with punk/metal, hip-hop, electronic, soul and funk influences.

== Music career ==
On 11 October 2012, Pearce released his first EP titled What I Might Do on MTA Records and Under the Shade. He released his debut single "What I Might Do" on 20 August 2013. "What I Might Do" samples vocals from R&B singer Anthony Hamilton's 2003 song "Cornbread, Fish & Collard Greens". After four years of releasing the song, in February 2016, he released his EP entitled Pomelo.

== Discography ==
=== Extended plays ===
- Pomelo (2016)

=== Singles ===
Year	Title	Peak chart positions				Certifications	Album
Year	Title	UK	BEL (Vl)	NL	SCO	Certifications	Album
2013	"What I Might Do"	7	15	40	10	BPI: Platinum	Non-album single

=== Other appearances ===
Year	Song	Release	Label
2012	"Hurt"	P.A One: Mixed by Ben Pearce	Purp & Soul

=== Remixes ===
Year	Song	Artist
2013	"Got a Feeling"	Josh Butler
2013	"Love Me Do"	Prunk
2013	"Cool"	Le Youth
2015	"Something About You"	Hayden James
2017	"Cover Me"	Depeche Mode
2021	"Snakes & Ladders" (VIP mix)	Ben Pearce (featuring Moss Kena)
