= Won't You (Be There) =

Single by Nero

from the album Welcome Reality +
- B-side: "Etude"
- Released: 19 October 2012
- Recorded: 2012
- Genre: Dubstep
- Length: 4:02
- Label: MTA; Mercury
- Songwriter(s): Richard Hall; Daniel Stephens; Joseph Ray; Alana Watson
- Producer(s): Richard Hall; Daniel Stephens; Joseph Ray

Nero singles chronology
"Must Be the Feeling" (2012)	"Won't You (Be There)" (2012)	"Satisfy" (2014)

"Won't You (Be There)" is a song by English electronic music duo Nero. It was released on 19 October 2012, peaking at number 156 on the UK Singles Chart and number 29 on the UK Dance Chart. The song was written by Richard Hall, Daniel Stephens, Joseph Ray and Alana Watson. The song samples "Thousand" by Moby (Richard Hall). "Won't You (Be There)" and its B-side track "Etude" both feature as new tracks from Welcome Reality +, the 2012 re-issue of their debut album.

The song was featured in the soundtrack for the 2012 video game, Need for Speed: Most Wanted.

== Track listing ==
Digital download
No.	Title	Length
1.	"Won't You (Be There)"	4:02
2.	"Etude"	4:17
3.	"Won't You (Be There)" (Baauer remix)	3:14
4.	"Won't You (Be There)" (Club Cheval remix)	4:00

== Chart performance ==
Chart (2012)	Peak position
Belgium (Ultratip Bubbling Under Flanders)	90
UK Dance (OCC)	29
UK Singles (The Official Charts Company)	156

== Release history ==
Region	Date	Format	Label
United Kingdom	19 October 2012	Digital download	MTA; Mercury
