= Reaching Out (Nero song) =

Single by Nero featuring Daryl Hall

from the album Welcome Reality
- Released: 16 December 2011
- Recorded: 2011
- Genre: Dubstep; drum and bass; electro house; synth-pop; new wave
- Length: 4:45
- Label: MTA; Mercury
- Songwriters: Daniel Stephens; Joseph Ray; Alana Watson; Daryl Hall
- Producer: Nero

Nero singles chronology
"Crush On You" (2011)	"Reaching Out" (2011)	"Must Be the Feeling" (2012)

Reaching Out is a song by UK electronic trio Nero from their debut album Welcome Reality. It was released as the sixth single from the album on 16 December 2011, peaking at number 92 on the UK Singles Chart and number nine on the UK Dance Chart.

== Creation ==
Drafted out by Daniel Stephens, he had an original vision in his mind of sampling Daryl Hall's voice. The office next door to Nero's was occupied by the producer for Hall's latest solo album, Laughing Down Crying, who agreed to put the pair in touch. Hall hence agreed to lay down a full original set of vocals, recorded by Nero.

The track samples an arpeggio from 80's Italian dance group Kano's "Another Life", and features guest vocals from Daryl Hall from Hall & Oates. The song also heavily samples the duo's 80's hit "Out of Touch".

== Music video ==
A music video to accompany the release of "Reaching Out" was uploaded to YouTube on 25 November 2011 at a total length of 2 minutes and 57 seconds.

The video heavily references the opening sequences for 80's TV series, such as Miami Vice and Kojak by using original stock footage to build a TV title sequence narrative, suggestively set in Miami or a similar beach-city. The creators also add ludicrous typography and clunky, over-the-top transitions to match. The video also stars all members of Nero (including Alana Watson), as well as a guest appearance by Hall.

== Track listing ==
Album version
No.	Title	Length
1.	"Reaching Out"	4:45

UK iTunes EP
No.	Title	Length
1.	"Reaching Out" (radio edit)	2:52
2.	"Reaching Out" (Booka Shade remix)	6:38
3.	"Reaching Out" (Fred Falke remix)	7:34
4.	"Reaching Out" (Wilkinson remix)	4:32

== Personnel ==
- Lead vocals – Daryl Hall
- Producers – Nero
- Lyrics – Daniel Stephens, Joseph Ray, Alana Watson, Daryl Hall
- Label: MTA, Mercury

== Chart performance ==
Chart (2011)	Peak position
Belgium Dance (Ultratop Flanders)	50
Belgium (Ultratip Bubbling Under Flanders)	28
UK Dance (OCC)	9
UK Singles (OCC)	92
