= Innocence (Nero song) =

"Innocence / Electron"

Single by Nero

from the album Welcome Reality
- B-side: "Electron"
- Released: 26 April 2010
- Recorded: 2010
- Length: 5:16
- Label: MTA; Mercury
- Songwriters: Daniel Stephens; Joseph Ray
- Producer: Nero

Nero singles chronology
"Act Like You Know" (2009)	"Innocence / Electron" (2010)	"Me & You" (2011)

"Innocence" is a song by British dubstep trio Nero. It was released in the United Kingdom as a digital download on 26 April 2010 as the lead single from the debut studio album, Welcome Reality – also acting as a double A-side with the track "Electron". The single peaked at number 167 on the UK Singles Chart, also reaching number 15 and number 16 on the independent releases chart and dance chart respectively.

== Music video ==
A music video to accompany the release of "Innocence" was first posted onto YouTube on 2 April 2010. It is composed almost entirely from clips of the anime OVA series, Cyber City Oedo 808.

== Track listing ==
Digital download
No.	Title	Length
1.	"Innocence" (original mix)	5:16
2.	"Electron" (original mix)	4:41

== Charts ==
Chart (2010)	Peak position
UK Dance (OCC)	16
UK Indie (OCC)	15
UK Singles (The Official Charts Company)	167

== Release history ==
Region	Date	Format	Label
Ireland	26 April 2010	Digital download	MTA; Mercury
United Kingdom	26 April 2010	Digital download	MTA; Mercury
United Kingdom	3 May 2010	Vinyl	MTA; Mercury
