= Guilt (Nero song) =

Single by Nero

from the album Welcome Reality
- Released: 22 April 2011
- Recorded: 2010
- Genre: Dubstep; electronic rock
- Length: 3:47
- Label: MTA; Mercury
- Songwriter(s): Joseph Ray; Daniel Stephens; Alana Watson
- Producer(s): Nero

Nero singles chronology
"Me & You" (2011)	"Guilt" (2011)	"Promises" (2011)

"Guilt" is a song by British dubstep trio Nero. It was released as a digital download on 22 April 2011 by Chase & Status' record label, MTA Records. This song is featured on Nero's debut studio album, Welcome Reality.

== Critical reception ==
The song has been generally well received, with Lewis Corner of Digital Spy rating it "5 stars" and naming it a "speaker blowing tune". Zane Lowe named the single in his Hottest Record blog, calling it "Epic blockbuster dubstep". Amy Dawson of the Metro said that the track manages to "meld a feathery female vocal with a low-slung, wibbling beast of a chorus that should steamroller through stadiums".

== Track listing ==
Digital download
No.	Title	Length
1.	"Guilt" (radio edit)	2:56
2.	"Guilt" (original mix)	4:42
3.	"Guilt" (Culture Shock remix)	4:50
4.	"Innocence" (Feed Me remix)	6:30
5.	"Guilt" (VIP mix)	4:54

== Chart performance ==
The single "Guilt" made its first appearance on the UK chart on 1 May 2011, when it debuted at number eight. The single spent one week in the top 10, sliding to number 15 on its second official week in the chart. "Guilt" spent a total of seven weeks in the top 40, falling out on 19 June 2011. The single also reached peaks of number two and number four on the independent chart and dance chart respectively – although they have since been removed from archives.

== Music video ==
=== Synopsis ===
The video for the song was first posted on YouTube on 25 March 2011. It was directed by Christian Larson. It features an exotic dancer, Lucy Cork, entertaining business-like clients in a futuristic club called Guilt to the beat of the song. It begins by following two customers into the club. The vocalist, Alana, is occasionally seen to be in the same club, and is intermittently cut to during the vocal parts of the song. The action focusses mostly around one exotic dancer with a facial covering. As the song hits its breakdown, we see an overhead shot of the futuristic city, before cutting back to the club, where the dancer asks a client (who wears sunglasses similar to those worn by the Nero members in the video for Me and You) in an unknown subtitled tongue "Do you want to see the special show?". The client nods, and the dance continues as the music reenters. The dancer displays extreme pole dancing moves as light begins to shine from her eyes. As the song ends, the clients jump to their feet, celebrating, and the dancer pulls her facial covering down to reveal a deformed mouth area and what appear to be fangs. A glass smashes and the camera zooms out past the Guilt sign on the door.

== Charts ==
=== Weekly charts ===
Chart (2011)	Peak position
Australia (ARIA)	62
Belgium (Ultratip Bubbling Under Flanders)	5
Scotland (OCC)	11
UK Singles (OCC)	8

=== Year-end charts ===
Chart (2011)	Position
UK Singles (OCC)	118

== Release history ==
Region	Date	Format	Label
Ireland	22 April 2011	Digital download	MTA; Mercury
United Kingdom	22 April 2011	Digital download	MTA; Mercury
