= Welcome Reality =

Studio album by Nero
- Released: 12 August 2011
- Recorded: 6 October 2008 – 1 April 2011
- Genre: Dubstep; electro house; new rave; drum and bass
- Length: 61:10
- Label: MTA; Mercury
- Producer: Nero

Nero chronology
Welcome Reality (2011)	Between II Worlds (2015)

Alternative cover
- 2012 re-issue (Welcome Reality +)

Singles from Welcome Reality
- 1. "Innocence" Released: 26 April 2010; 2. "Me and You" Released: 2 January 2011; 3. "Guilt" Released: 24 April 2011; 4. "Promises" Released: 5 August 2011; 5. "Crush on You" Released: 13 October 2011; 6. "Reaching Out" Released: 16 December 2011; 7. "Must Be the Feeling" Released: 5 March 2012; 8. "Won't You (Be There)" Released: 19 October 2012

Welcome Reality is the debut album by British dubstep group Nero. A concept album, it was released first in Ireland on 12 August 2011 and the rest of the world on 15 August 2011 except Australia and New Zealand where it was released on 19 August 2011 on Chase & Status's MTA Records. The album has sold 120,000 copies in the United States as of July 2015.

== Critical response ==
Professional ratings
Aggregate scores
Source	Rating
Metacritic	68/100
Review scores
Source	Rating
AllMusic	3/5 stars
Clash	4/10
The Guardian	3/5 stars
MusicOMH	3/5 stars
PopMatters	7/10
Spin	7/10

Welcome Reality has received generally positive reviews. Spin gave the album a score of 7/10, and wrote, "Alana Watson gives Nero's robotic skronk a rare injection of humanity, and the U.K. producers are smart enough to build most of their debut full-length around her husky voice, skipping the sampled spasticity of Skrillex in favor of Daft Punk's melodic big beat, '80s-inspired electro, and stadium-sized mash-ups of squealing guitar and windy synths." Jeff Weiss, for the Los Angeles Times, found the album to be "As effective as it is predictable", stating "Welcome Reality will inevitably soundtrack thousands of summer and fall blowouts". The album was not well received by Clash, who stated that "Welcome Reality is so in your face and predictable it feels like the musical equivalent of a Michael Bay movie: loud, crass, periodically fun, but ultimately forgettable".

== Track listing ==
Welcome Reality track listing
No.	Title	Length
1.	"2808"	1:53
2.	"Doomsday"	4:12
3.	"My Eyes"	4:41
4.	"Guilt"	4:43
5.	"Fugue State"	3:35
6.	"Me and You"	4:08
7.	"Innocence"	5:08
8.	"In the Way"	3:57
9.	"Scorpions"	5:56
10.	"Crush on You"	4:10
11.	"Must Be the Feeling"	4:03
12.	"Reaching Out"	4:45
13.	"Promises"	4:17
14.	"Departure"	5:34

iTunes deluxe edition bonus tracks
No.	Title	Length
15.	"Angst" (inspired by Justice)	4:51
16.	"Welcome Reality VIP"	4:27
17.	"This Way" (album version)	5:49
18.	"New Life"	4:33
19.	"Choices" (album version)	6:14
20.	"Symphony 2808"	17:34
21.	"Symphony 2808" (Video)	18:12

Welcome Reality + bonus tracks
No.	Title	Length
15.	"Won't You (Be There)"	4:03
16.	"Etude"	4:17
17.	"Promises" (Skrillex and Nero Remix)	4:28

== Charts ==
=== Weekly charts ===
Weekly chart performance for Welcome Reality
Chart (2011–2012)	Peak position
Australian Albums (ARIA)	12
Belgian Albums (Ultratop Flanders)	29
Irish Albums (IRMA)	52
New Zealand Albums (RMNZ)	32
Scottish Albums (OCC)	2
Swiss Albums (Schweizer Hitparade)	88
UK Albums (OCC)	1
UK Dance Albums (OCC)	1
US Heatseekers Albums (Billboard)	6
US Top Current Albums (Billboard)	178
US Top Dance Albums (Billboard)	6

=== Year-end charts ===
Year-end chart performance for Welcome Reality
Chart (2011)	Position
UK Albums (OCC)	98
Chart (2012)	Position
UK Albums (OCC)	186
US Top Dance/Electronic Albums (Billboard)	16

== Certifications ==
Certifications for Welcome Reality
Region	Certification	Certified units/sales
Australia (ARIA)	Gold	35,000^{^}
New Zealand (RMNZ)	Gold	7,500^{‡}
United Kingdom (BPI)	Gold	100,000^{^}
^{^} Shipments figures based on certification alone.^{‡} Sales+streaming figures based on certification alone.
