= Must Be the Feeling =

Single by Nero

from the album Welcome Reality
- Released: 5 March 2012
- Length: 4:03
- Songwriter(s): Leula Wallace Clark, Daisy Orean Earnest

Nero singles chronology
"Reaching Out" (2011)	"Must Be the Feeling" (2012)	"Won't You (Be There)" (2012)

Must Be the Feeling is a song by UK electronic music trio Nero from their debut album Welcome Reality. It was released as the seventh and final single from the album on 5 March 2012, peaking at number 25 on the UK Dance Chart. The song samples Carmen's 1984 song "Time to Move".

== Music video ==
A music video to accompany the release of "Must Be the Feeling" was directed by Warren Fu and uploaded to YouTube on 10 February 2012 at a total length of four minutes.

== Track listing ==
Album version
No.	Title	Length
1.	"Must Be the Feeling"	4:03

UK iTunes EP
No.	Title	Length
1.	"Must Be the Feeling" (radio edit)	3:07
2.	"Must Be the Feeling" (live)	6:42
3.	"Must Be the Feeling" (Flux Pavilion and Nero remix)	5:10
4.	"Must Be the Feeling" (SebastiAn remix)	4:41
5.	"Must Be the Feeling" (Brookes Brothers remix)	4:42
6.	"Must Be the Feeling" (Azari & III remix)	6:16
7.	"Must Be the Feeling" (Kill the Noise remix)	4:25

== Chart performance ==
Chart (2012)	Peak position
Belgium Dance (Ultratop Flanders)	3
Belgium (Ultratip Bubbling Under Flanders)	6
UK Dance (OCC)	25
UK Singles (OCC)	124
