= Promises (Nero song) =

Single by Nero

from the album Welcome Reality
- Released: 5 August 2011
- Genre: Dubstep; breakbeat
- Length: 4:17
- Label: MTA; Mercury
- Songwriters: Daniel Stephens; Joe Ray; Alana Watson
- Producer: Nero

Nero singles chronology
"Guilt" (2011)	"Promises" (2011)	"Crush on You" (2011)

"Promises" is a song by British EDM trio Nero that appears on their debut studio album, Welcome Reality (track No. 4) on 5 August 2011. The song debuted at number one on the UK Singles Chart, becoming the group's first chart-topping single. It sold 46,700 copies in its first week, the lowest first-week sales for a number one in 97 weeks. In 2013, the Skrillex and Nero remix of the song, won the Grammy Award for Best Remixed Recording, Non-Classical. "Promises" was nominated for an Ivor Novello Award in the category of Best Contemporary Song. The song was featured on a Hewlett-Packard TV commercial in the United Kingdom, France, United States and Latin America, giving it a broader audience and more recognition. It was also featured in trailers from the video game Sonic & All-Stars Racing Transformed. It also featured in the 2013 video game Saints Row IV.

== Music video ==
A music video to accompany the release of "Promises", directed by Ben Newman, was uploaded to YouTube on 7 July 2011 at a total length of four minutes and sixteen seconds. It shows a woman in a dystopian regimented future society with mandatory drug consumption, similar in style to the film Equilibrium. By April 2022, it had surpassed 43 million YouTube views.

== Critical reception ==
Robert Copsey of Digital Spy gave the song a positive review, stating:

"Promises, and they still feel oh so wasted on myself," she admits with her high-wired vocals over a thick, head-banging melody, fuzzy synths and pulsating basslines wobblier than our man's dodgy left knee. The result is the sharpest, most head-spinning of their releases to date – and given that we're in the year of dubstep-goes-pop, should leave fans fully equipped to handle the g-force levels of their first long player.

== Impact and legacy ==
In 2022, American magazine Rolling Stone ranked "Promises" number 42 in their list of 200 Greatest Dance Songs of All Time.

== Track listing ==
Digital download EP
No.	Title	Length
1.	"Promises"	4:17
2.	"Promises" (Skrillex and Nero remix)	4:28
3.	"Promises" (Calvin Harris remix)	5:59
4.	"New Life"	4:33

== Charts ==
=== Weekly charts ===
Weekly chart performance for "Promises"
Chart (2011–2012)	Peak position
Australia (ARIA)	33
Australia Dance Singles (ARIA)	9
Austria (Ö3 Austria Top 40)	28
Belgium (Ultratop 50 Flanders)	27
Belgium (Ultratip Bubbling Under Wallonia)	7
France (SNEP)	61
Germany (GfK)	67
Netherlands (Single Top 100)	80
New Zealand (Recorded Music NZ)	26
Scottish Singles Sales (Official Charts)	1
Switzerland (Schweizer Hitparade)	34
UK Singles (Official Charts)	1
UK Dance (Official Charts)	1
US Billboard Hot 100	70

=== Year-end charts ===
Year-end chart performance for "Promises"
Chart (2011)	Position
UK Singles (OCC)	135

== Certifications ==
Certifications for "Promises"
Region	Certification	Certified units/sales
Australia (ARIA)	Platinum	70,000^{^}
Canada (Music Canada)	Platinum	80,000^{*}
New Zealand (RMNZ)	Platinum	15,000^{*}
United Kingdom (BPI)	Gold	400,000^{‡}
United States (RIAA)	Gold	500,000^{*}
^{*} Sales figures based on certification alone.^{^} Shipments figures based on certification alone.^{‡} Sales+streaming figures based on certification alone.

== Release history ==
Release history for "Promises"
Region	Date	Format	Label
Ireland	5 August 2011	Digital download	MTA; Mercury
Spain	5 August 2011	Digital download	MTA; Mercury
United Kingdom	5 August 2011	Digital download	MTA; Mercury
