= MTA Records =

- Founded: 2009
- Founder: Chase & Status
- Status: Inactive
- Genre: Drum and bass; rap; grime; soul; dubstep; deep house; UK garage
- Country of origin: United Kingdom
- Location: London, England
- Official website: http://www.mtarecords.co.uk/ (Archived January 13, 2019)

More Than Alot (MTA) Records is an independent record label founded by Chase & Status in 2009, specialising in "exceptional" music. The label releases a large variety of music including rap, soul, drum and bass, dubstep and deep house. It has played a pivotal role in the success of Nero, Redlight, 16bit, Ben Pearce among others, and many of its releases have charted in the United Kingdom.

On 19 February 2015, the label competed against Hospital Records, Black Butter Records and 3 Beat Records in BBC Radio 1Xtra's "Best of British Soundclash". Hosted by MistaJam, the event served as an unofficial sequel to Red Bull's Culture Clash 2014 (also hosted by MistaJam). MTA won, having received the most Twitter votes from listeners.

== Artists ==
- 16bit
- 1991
- Abigail Wyles
- Bakersville
- Ben Pearce
- Catchment
- Chase & Status
- Dellux
- Dimension
- Franky Rizardo
- Kill Them With Colour
- Knytro
- Kove
- MANT
- Moko
- Moody Good
- My Nu Leng
- Nero
- Nyko
- Ossie
- Redlight
- Scales
- TCTS
- Tru Fonix (aka Torqux)
- Wyles & Simpson

== Releases ==
=== Studio albums ===
Year	No.	Artist	Title
2011	MTARECLP001	Nero	Welcome Reality
2014	MTARECLP002	Moody Good	Moody Good
2014	MTARECLP003	Dream Mclean	Greyscale
2014	MTARECLP004	Various Artists	MTA 5
2015	MTARECLP005	Wyles & Simspson	Wyles & Simpson
2015	MTARECLP006	Nero	Between II Worlds

=== Singles and EPs ===
Year	Category	Artist	Title	Songs
2009	MTAREC001	Doctor & Cotti / 501	Rise The Temperature / Insanity	Rise The Temperature, Insanity
2010	MTAREC002	Nero	Innocence / Electron	Innocence, Electron
2010	MTAREC003	Redlight	What You Talking About!?	What You Talking About!? (feat. Ms Dynamite), Radio Edit, Accapella, What You Talking About!? (Roska remix), MDMA, Chopsticks
2011	MTAREC004	Nero	Me & You	Me & You, Welcome Reality, Me & You (Dirtyphonics remix), Me & You (Danger remix), Me & You (Kamuki remix)
2011	MTAREC005	16bit	FRZR9000	FRZR9000, Skullcrack
2011	MTAREC006	Nero	Guilt	Guillt, Guilt (Culture Shock remix), Gulit VIP, Innocence (Feed Me remix)
2011	MTAREC007	Nero	Promises	Promises, Promises (Skrillex & Nero remix), Promises (Calvin Harris remix), New Life
2011	MTAREC008	16bit	Dinosaurs	Dinosaurs, Boston Creme
2011	MTAREC009	Nero	Crush On You	Crush On You, Crush On You (Knife Party remix), Crush On You (KillSonik remix), Crush On You (Brodinski remix)
2011	MTAREC010	Nero	Reaching Out	Reaching Out (Radio Edit), Reaching Out (Wilkinson remix), Reaching Out (Booka Shade remix), Reaching Out (Fred Falke remix)
2012	MTAREC011	Redlight	Get Out My Head	Get Out My Head, Get Out My Head (Joker remix)
2012	MTAREC012	Nero	Must Be the Feeling	Must Be The Feeling (Radio Edit), Must Be The Feeling (Live Version), Must Be The Feeling (Flux Pavilion & Nero remix), Must Be The Feeling (SebastiAn remix), Must Be The Feeling (Brookes Brothers remix), Must Be The Feeling (Azari & III remix), Must Be The Feeling (Kill The Noise remix)
2012	MTAREC013	KillSonik	Bloodlust	Bloodlust, Girly
2012	MTAREC014	Dream Mclean	Network	Network, Network (Chase & Status remix)
2012	MTAREC015	Nero	Won't You (Be There)	Won't You (Be There), Etude, Won't You (Be There) (Baauer remix), Won't You (Be There) (Club Cheval remix)
2012	MTAREC016	Ben Pearce	What I Might Do	What I Might Do, What I Might Do (Club Edit), What I Might Do (Harry Wolfman remix), What I Might Do (Adam Shelton remix), What I Might Do (Bonar Bradberry remix)
2013	MTAREC017	Josh Butler	Got A Feeling	Got A Feeling, Warm Embrace, Got A Feeling (Bontan remix), Got A Feeling (Ben Pearce remix), Warm Embrace (Bass Version)
2013	MTAREC018	KillSonik	Where The River Runs Black EP	Where The River Runs Black, Walrus, Slaughterhouse (feat. James Smith), Je Te Veux, Slaughterhouse (Radio Edit)
2013	MTAREC019	Torqux	Blazin' EP	Blazin' (feat. Lady Leshurr), Hit Me, Blazin' (Dimension remix)
2013	MTAREC020	Dream Mclean	Sloe Gin	Sloe Gin, Sloe Gin (SION remix), Sloe Gin (Dub Phizix remix)
2013	MTAREC021	Dream Mclean	Weatherman EP	Weatherman, Take Me Away (feat. Bandit Blacks), Titanic (feat. Siris), White Lies, Weatherman (Lynx Remix), Weatherman (Balistiq Remix), Weatherman (Smudge Remix)
2013	MTAREC022	KillSonik	Leviathan	Leviathan
2013	MTAREC023	Elli Ingram	Sober EP	Mad Love, Sober, Elliot, High Love, Fun, Poetic Justice (Retrial)
2013	MTAREC024	Abigail Wyles	Mantra	Mantra, Mantra (Doc Daneeka Remix), Mantra (Andrea Remix)
2013	MTAREC025	Kove	Measures EP	Searching, Love For You, Night Thought, Losing You
2013	MTAREC026	Knytro	Project Haarpoon	Tower Champ, Still Standing, Brooklyn, Domini Effect, Status Quo, H.U.H, Who Am I?, Simplicity, So Gone, Pharohe, Ill Legit, Interlude, HAARP, Orchid
2013	MTAREC027	SION	Make You Do	Make You Do, Make You Do (Kolombo Remix), Make You Do (Markas Remix)
2013	MTAREC028	Torqux	So Divine	So Divine (feat. Tiffani Juno), So Divine (Club Mix), Get Down, Silhouette, So Divine (Jus Now Remix), Get Down (Club Mix)
2013	MTAREC029	Josh Butler	Closer	Closer, Keep Movin
2013	MTAREC030	Ben Pearce	What I Might Do (Remixes)	What I Might Do (Karma Kid Remix), What I Might Do (Kilter Remix), What I Might Do (Kolombo Remix)
2013	MTAREC031	Moko	Black EP	Freeze, Hand on Heart, Summon the Strength, Honey Cocaine
2013	MTAREC032	Louis M^ttrs	Beachy Head EP	War with Heaven, Killing Me Differently, God's Help, XXYYXX – Luv U Grl Pt. 2 (Louis M^ttrs Refix), War with Heaven (Catching Flies Remix)
2014	MTAREC033	Kove	Gobble & Melisma	Gobble, Melisma
2014	MTAREC034	Toyboy & Robin	Better Places EP	Better Places (feat. Alex Adams), Back & Forth (feat. Nikki Cislyn), All The Night, Beneath The Cold (feat. FEMME)
2014	MTAREC035	Moody Good	Musicbx	Musicbx (feat. Eryn Allen Kane)
2014	MTAREC036	Ben Pearce & Black Orange Juice	Predictable	Predictable, Predictable (Ben Pearce Re-Work), Predictable (Citizen Remix), Predictable (Extended Mix)
2014	MTAREC037	Moody Good	Hotplate	Hotplate (feat. Knytro), Hotplate (Prolix Remix)
2014	MTAREC038	Kove	Way We Are	Way We Are (feat. Melissa Steel), Way We Are (Extended Mix), Way We Are (Dub Mix), Way We Are (174 Mix), Liberator
2014	MTAREC039	Knytro	The Griffin	Capone, My Motive (Movement), Guinness, Ms Cola
2014	MTAREC040	TCTS	Games EP	Games (feat. KStewart), You (feat. Sam Sure), Trust, Forward
2014	MTAREC041	Nero	Satisfy	Satisfy
2014	MTAREC042	Moko	Gold EP	Your Love, Ceremony, With You, Missing Love
2014	MTAREC042A	Moko	Your Love (Remixes)	Your Love (Culture Shock Remix), Your Love (GotSome Remix), Your Love (Mao Ra Sun Remix)
2014	MTAREC043	MANT	MANT EP	Vigo, Close To You (feat. ANINA), Orchid, Mant Theme, What Life's For
2014	MTAREC044	Mob Tactics	The Answer EP	The Answer (feat. Lauren Johnson), Savages, Alcatraz, Mirror Mirror
2014	MTAREC045	Ten Ven & Ripley vs. Zebra Katz	1 Bad Bitch	1 Bad Bitch
2014	MTAREC045A	Ten Ven & Ripley vs. Zebra Katz	1 Bad Bitch (Remixes)	1 Bad Bitch (Cause & Affect Remix), 1 Bad Bitch (Dear David Remix), 1 Bad Bitch (Kove Remix), 1 Bad Bitch (Kirk Spencer Remix)
2014	MTAREC046	Torqux	Open Up / I Still Breathe	Open Up, I Still Breathe
2014	MTAREC047	Josh Butler & Bontan	We Found a Place	We Found a Place (feat. Josh Barry), We Found a Place (Dub Mix)
2014	MTAREC048	Kove	Murmurations	Drop, Feel Love Again (with Dimension), VCO, Still High
2014	MTAREC049	Hervé	Money Where Your Mouth Is	Money Where Your Mouth Is (feat. Knytro)
2014	MTAREC050	Mob Tactics	Gasp For Breathe / Watch The Beat	Gasp For Breathe, Watch The Beat
2014	MTAREC051	Dimension	Love To Me / Move Faster	Love To Me, Move Faster
2014	MTAREC052	Wyles & Simpson	Light And Dark	Light And Dark, Light And Dark (Doc Daneeka Remix), Light And Dark (Wyles & Simpson Remix)
2015	MTAREC053	Bobby Tank	Semi-Precious	Semi-Precious (feat. Cass Lowe), Semi-Precious (Tru Fonix Remix), Semi-Precious (Joe Mccrilley Remix)
2015	MTAREC054	GotSome	Vibe Out	Vibe Out (feat. Wiley), Vibe Out (DJ Edit), Vibe Out (Dub Mix), Vibe Out (Toyboy & Robin Remix), Vibe Out (Jus Now Remix)
2015	MTAREC055	TCTS	Body EP	Thinking About You (feat. Leo Kalyan), Coupe De Ville (feat. Aniff Akinola), For Life, House Lights On, Thinking About You (Booka Shade Remix), Thinking About You (Few Nolder Remix)
2015	MTAREC056	Dimension	Jet Black / Whip Slap	Jet Black, Whip Slap
2015	MTAREC057	Nero	The Thrill	The Thrill
2015	MTAREC057A	Nero	The Thrill (Remixes)	The Thrill (Porter Robinson Remix), The Thrill (TCTS Remix), The Thrill (René LaVice Thrillseeking Remix), The Thrill (KANT Remix)
2015	MTAREC058	Kove	Hurts	Hurts (feat. Moko)
2015	MTARECO58A	Kove	Hurts (Remixes)	Hurts (Kove's Reesy Lover VIP), Hurts (Kideko Remix), Hurts (LSB Remix), Hurts (Special Request Remix), Hurts (Jade Blue Remix)
2015	MTAREC059	Various Artists	MTA Summer EP	Maurice James – Heart Burn, Author – Belief, Kursa – Unaware, Etched – Nayru, Chris Dogzout & CZuR – Dirty
2015	MTAREC060	Dimension	Pull Me Under / Maschinen	Pull Me Under (feat. Raphaella), Maschinen
2015	MTAREC061	Kill Them With Colour	Get High	Get High, Get High (Extended Mix), Get High (VIP Mix)
2015	MTAREC062	My Nu Leng	Horizons EP	Horizons (feat. Caan), Warrior, Set It (with FineArt), Pushed (feat. Detour City), BS3 (with Taiki Nulight)
2015	MTAREC063	Nyko	Elektron	Elektron, CTRL
2015	MTAREC064	Ossie	Cape Town Is Calling	Cape Town Is Calling, Alva Flex
2015	MTAREC065	Baskerville	Times	Times
2015	MTAREC065A	Baskerville	Times (Remixes)	Times (Catchment Remix), Times (Document One Remix)
2015	MTAREC066	Nero	Two Minds	Two Minds
2015	MTAREC066A	Nero	Two Minds (Remixes)	Two Minds (Nero's '92 Minds Mix), Two Minds (Dimension Remix), Two Minds (David Zowie Remix), Two Minds (FineArt Remix)
2015	MTAREC067	Franky Rizardo	Ragga Nation	Ragga Nation (Ft. FERAL is KINKY)
2015	MTAREC068	SCALES	Loves Got Me High	Loves Got Me High
2015	MTAREC068A	SCALES	Loves Got Me High (Remixes)	Loves Got Me High (Sonny Fodera Remix), Loves Got Me High (Sonny Fodera Dub Mix), Loves Got Me High (Baskerville Remix), Loves Got Me High (Morrt Remix), Loves Got Me High (Koncept Remix), Loves Got Me High (SCALES Dub Mix)
2015	MTAREC069	Braxton	21 Days	21 Days, 21 Days (Extended Mix), Aspidistra
2015	MTAREC070	MANT	Freedom EP	Freedom, Losing You, Dip Dab
2015	MTAREC071	Various Artists	MTA Autumn EP	Jauge – Soon, Leon Lour – Purpose To Be, Dellux – Missing U, SQUASH! – In The Beginning, Kindred – Killa
2015	MTAREC072	Catchment	Wait For You	Wait For You, On Top
2015	MTAREC073	Dimension	Dark Lights / Panzer	Dark Lights, Panzer
2015	MTAREC078	Various Artists	MTA Winter EP	ATYK – Giddy, Bromley x Dread MC – Gwan Wid It, Rrotik – Hustlaz, GLXY – Maze, Transcode – Earth
2015	TBA	Chase & Status	London Bars EP	Funny (feat. Frisco), More Ratatatin (feat. Giggs), Wha Gwarn? (feat. Bonkaz), Bigger Man Sound (feat. Novelist)
2016	TBA	Nero	Into The Night (Remixes)	Into The Night (Nero 1998 Remix), Into The Night (MANT Remix), Into The Night (Friend Within Remix), Into The Night (Dawn Wall Remix), Into The Night (Amtrac Remix), Into The Night (Attlas Remix), Into The Night (Leon Reverse Remix)
2016	MTAREC079	Dellux	Dreamer EP	Missing U VIP, Dreamer, Fool (feat. Beckii Power), Beat01633, Pipe Up
2016	MTAREC081	Catchment	DJ's Delight / Get That	DJ's Delight, DJ's Delight (Radio Mix), Get That, Get That (Radio Mix)
2016	MTAREC082	Ossie	Ossie EP	I'm Not The One, North (feat. Raphaella), Colours (feat. Sadie Walker), Hard Bass Mutha F****r, Bloodline
2016	MTAREC083	1991	Sprites / Witchdoctor	Sprites, Witchdoctor
2016	MTAREC084	Posij	Hunger EP	Hunger, Not Normal, Rattle Rattle, Train
2016	MTAREC085	Jammer	Sun City	Sun City
2016	MTAREC086	My Nu Leng & Flava D	Soul Shake	Soul Shake, Soul Shake (1991 Remix), Soul Shake (Dellux Remix)
2016	MTAREC087	Solardo & MANT	Solardo & MANT EP	Something Like That, Losing You (Redux)
2016	MTAREC088	ATYK	Scandal / Pandemic	Scandal, Pandemic
2016	MTAREC089	Braxton	Stronger EP	Something About You (Ft. Ava James), Stronger (Ft. Danni Wells), Kowloon, Forever,
2016	MTAREC090	Dellux x Izzie Gibbs	Normal (Pipe Up)	Normal (Pipe Up)
2016	MTAREC091	Various Artists	MTA Spring EP 16	Felon – Burglar Bill, Khésis – Heatshield, Mitekiss – Hyperbole, Volatile Cycle – Feel Good, Kasbo – I Don't Get, Vacant – Eternal
2016	MTAREC092	Dimension	Automatik / Hydraulic	Automatik, Hydraulic I, Hydraulic II
2016	MTAREC093	1991	Nine Clouds / Bad	Nine Clouds, Bad
2016	MTAREC094	Dellux	Need U	Need U
2016	MTAREC095	1991	Dim Sum EP	Dim Sum, Bohemian, Jungle Cats, Steezy, Dim Sum (Radio Edit)
2016	MTAREC096	Dimension	UK / In Bleach	UK, In Bleach

=== Free releases ===
Year	Artist	Title	Songs
2013	SION	Gangster Walk (Hipster Lean Mix)	Gangster Walk (Hipster Lean Mix)
2013	SION	I Can't Stop	I Can't Stop
2013	KillSonik	Leviathan*	Leviathan
2013	SION	He Got Game	He Got Game
2013	Toyboy & Robin	Jaded VIP	Jaded VIP
2014	Moko	Freeze (TCTS Remix)	Freeze (TCTS Remix)
2014	Josh Butler	Get Up	Get Up
2014	Knytro	Mathmatic	Mathmatic
2015	Catchment	Feel It	Feel It
