= Nero (band) =

British electronic trio

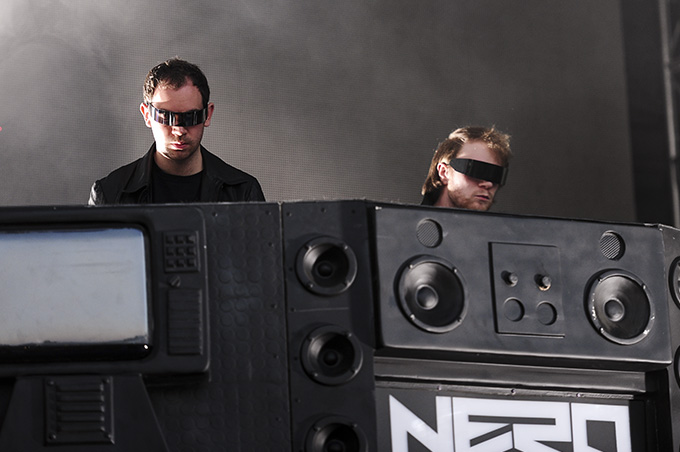
- Nero in 2012

Background information
- Origin: London, England
- Genres: Dubstep; drum and bass; electronic; future house
- Instruments: Personal computer; synthesizer; music sequencer; sampler; drum machine; turntables
- Years active: 2004–present
- Labels: MTA; Interscope; Cherrytree; Virgin EMI
- Members: Dan Stephens; Joe Ray; Alana Watson
- Website: intotheunknown.world; nero.komi.io

Nero (stylised as NERO) are an English electronic music trio composed of members Dan Stephens, Joe Ray, and Alana Watson. On 12 August 2011, they released their debut studio album, Welcome Reality, which reached number one in the UK Albums Chart. In August 2012, "Promises" received a Gold certification in the United States. On 10 February 2013, Nero won a Grammy Award for their collaborative remix of "Promises" with Skrillex. Their second studio album, Between II Worlds, was released on 11 September 2015.

== History ==
Ray and Stephens were both born in 1984. Ray grew up in Northwood, London, whilst Stephens grew up in Notting Hill. The boys met Watson when they were 18. Ray played classical guitar and Stephens played cello with encouragement from his free-jazz musician father. By the time a mutual friend introduced them at the age of 17, Stephens was attending the specialist music school at Pimlico. Outside school both were making electronic music on home computers. They began working together at 17, setting up a studio in Stephens' bedroom. The latter had already been a fan of jungle music after seeing M-Beat featuring General Levy on Top of the Pops in 1994. Ray's epiphany (according to Q), happened in the London club Fabric where the duo's ideas about producing were cemented.

Nero's debut release was "Space 2001" as part of the "Straight Outta Leicester" three piece vinyl LP on Reformed Recordings in 2004. Watson started featuring on Nero's songs from 2008, namely "Solid Air" (Punchy Recordings) and "This Way" (Audio Freaks) which was their debut dubstep release, and is now a full-time member of the band.

Nero released the EP, 'Requiem', 10 May 2006, predominantly hard drum and bass, which quickly saw their acknowledgement rise within the dance music scene.

Sasha Frere-Jones, journalist for the New Yorker Magazine, listed Nero's remix of The Streets, "Blinded by the Lights" in his top songs of 2009. The track had radio airplay in the U.K. as well as being played by DJs including Chase & Status, Skream, Tiësto and Diplo.

=== Welcome Reality (2010–2012) ===
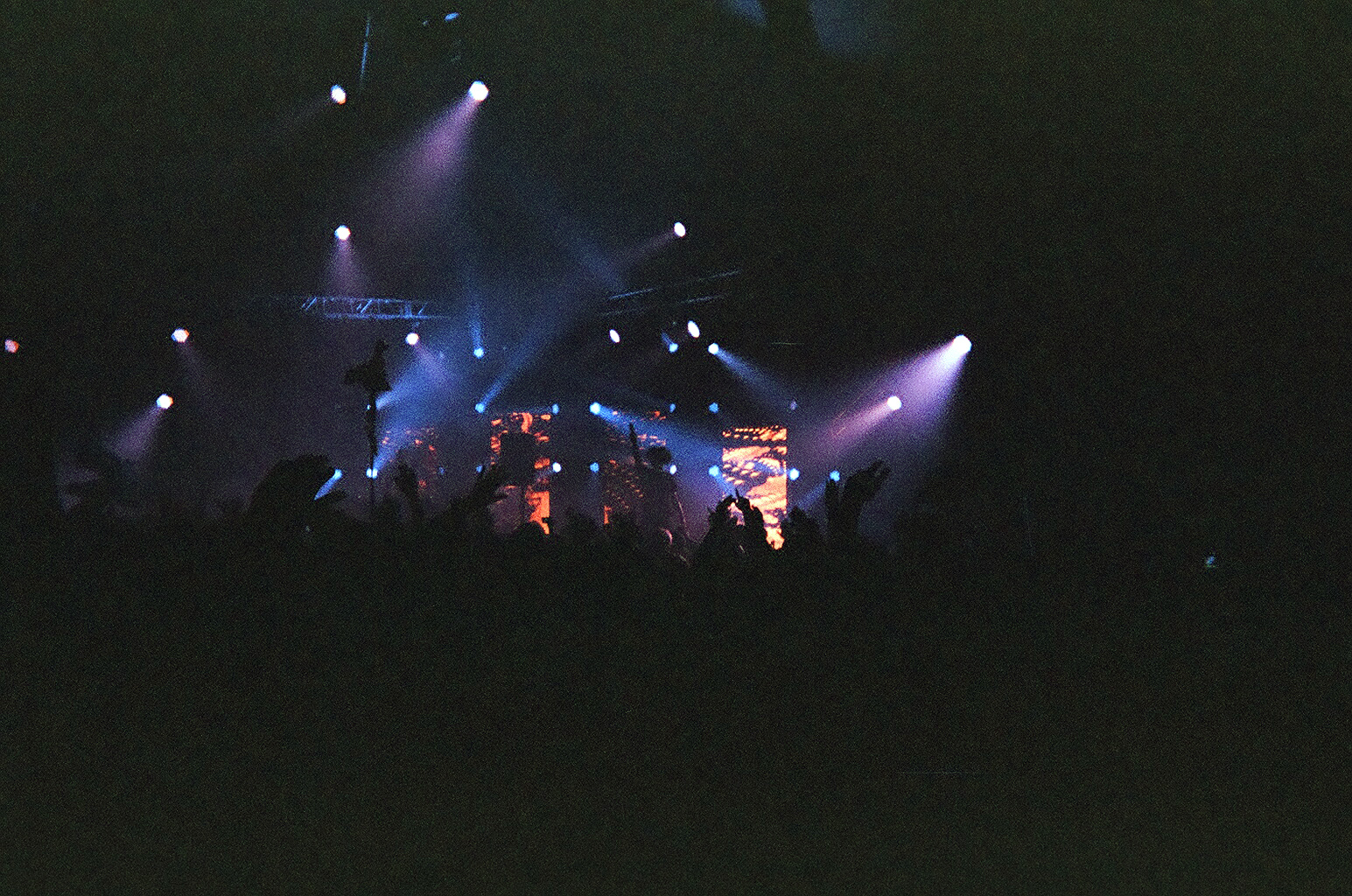
NERO performing at Camp Bisco X in Mariaville Lake, New York, on 9 July 2011.

The trio released their first single on MTA, "Innocence", in the United Kingdom on 26 April 2010. The single was released as a double A-side with the track "Electron" as a digital download, as well as on vinyl. The track peaked at number one hundred and sixty seven on the U.K. Singles Chart besides peaking at numbers sixteen and eleven on the Dance and Independent charts respectively. In November 2010, Nero unveiled their BBC Radio 1 Essential Mix. The mix went on to extreme critical acclaim and has been widely regarded as "The Greatest BBC Radio 1 Essential Mix of All Time". The mix was recorded at the height of the dubstep popularity and features a wide variety of genres such as; Drum and Bass, French House, Dubstep and Electronica. The 2010 Nero Essential Mix also later became a talking point on 4 September 2015 as there was a wide debate upon Reddit users on 'the best Essential Mix of all time'. On the website, users had a heavy favour of the mix (slightly edging out Zeds Dead in second place) even though it was recorded 5 years earlier, furthermore, it received the publicly voted awards of "Greatest Essential Mix of All Time" and "Fan Favorite Essential Mix" On 6 December 2010, Nero was nominated for the BBC's Sound of 2011 poll.

The nomination was followed by the addition of their second single on MTA "Me and You" to BBC Radio 1's A List playlist on 8 December 2010. The single was released in the United Kingdom as both a digital download and a 12" vinyl on 2 January 2011, where it debuted at number fifteen on the U.K. Singles Chart, also managing to reach the number one spot on the independent releases chart. The trio's third single, "Guilt" made its premiere on 22 February when Zane Lowe selected it as the Hottest Record in the World.

On the week ending dated 14 July 2012 "Promises" debuted at number 81 on the Billboard Hot 100 in the United States, which marked their first single to chart in the United States. Their debut album entitled Welcome Reality was released on 15 August 2011 and debuted at number one in the UK Albums Chart.

Nero composed an orchestral piece known as The Dubstep Symphony (later officially titled 'Symphony 2808'), performed by the band in collaboration with the BBC Philharmonic Orchestra, conducted by Joe Duddell on BBC Radio 1 on 6 June 2011.

The trio toured their live show after the release of their album during Autumn 2011 in both the United Kingdom and United States. In early 2012, the trio toured their live show entitled 'Second Reality Tour' across Australia, the United Kingdom and North America. Nero declined touring as a support act for Madonna's MDNA Tour over the summer, as they felt that they needed to spend much more time in the studio.

The Skrillex & Nero remix of Monsta's "Holdin On" received its premiere on Zane Lowe's BBC Radio 1 show on 1 October 2012. The remix was featured on Monsta's self-titled EP, released on 23 October 2012.

Their song, "Promises" is featured in the HP television advertisement for their notebooks with Beats Audio in 2012.

On 22 October 2012, their debut album was re-released as Welcome Reality +. It features two extra tracks, "Won't You (Be There)" and "Etude", along with the Skrillex & Nero remix of "Promises". An EP of "Won't You (Be There)" was released on the same day, featuring the original alongside "Etude" and remixes from Baauer and Club Cheval.

=== Between II Worlds (2013–2016) ===
On 23 April 2013, their track for the soundtrack of the Baz Luhrmann rendition of The Great Gatsby was revealed: "Into The Past".

On 12 November 2013, a 28-minute ambient piece was posted to their SoundCloud, along with the words "Sorry to have left you in the dark for so long. The second album is coming in 2014." On 24 December 2013, in an interview with Vh1 India, Nero revealed that the track was actually a 3-minute ambient song looped on purpose to be 28 minutes and 8 seconds long to reveal the number 2808 – a number frequently associated with Nero, which is the title of the first track on Welcome Reality."

On 13 May 2014, the album's lead single "Satisfy" premiered on BBC Radio 1 as Zane Lowe's Hottest Record in the World.

In February 2015 the band's record label MTA Records posted a picture of a tweet by Stuart Hawke stating that he had just started mastering the new album by Nero. On 19 March 2015, Nero announced they had finished the album, and premiered its second single, "The Thrill". The single was released on 20 March 2015 alongside remixes by Porter Robinson, TCTS, René LaVice and KANT.

On 10 April, it was announced that the album is called Between II Worlds, and it would be released on 28 August 2015 (coinciding with their recurring use of the number '2808') but the release date was later delayed to 11 September. The album was made available to pre-order on the same day, with "Satisfy" and the title track offered as an instant grat for those who pre-order a copy. The album features a reworked version of "Into the Past", from The Great Gatsby soundtrack. "Two Minds" was released as the album's third single on 11 September 2015. "Into the Night" was released as the fourth single from Between II Worlds on 8 January 2016.

=== Side projects and singles (2016–2022) ===
Group members Dan Stephens and Alana Watson got married in December 2015. They announced in June 2017 that they were expecting a baby and that Alana would not be resuming her touring duties until the baby's arrival in 2018.

NERO focused more on side projects after the release of Between II Worlds. Joe Ray launched a solo project in 2017, while Stephens and Watson announced a new electronic pop project The Night in March 2018. During promotion for The Night, Stephens and Watson clarified that NERO was still active alongside the side projects, with new music in the works.

In 2021 during the lead-up to the 10th Anniversary of Welcome Reality, the debut album, the band released three remixes of classics from Daft Punk, Frankie Goes to Hollywood and Disciples after a nearly two year silence. They also announced they were working on their third album.

In 2022, NERO joined deadmau5's “We Are Friends” tour as the main support act. They also went on to remix the deadmau5 track “XYZ” on his label mau5trap, which was released on August 26, 2022. They have also released a highly anticipated new track called “Renegade” which features the artist RL Grime and was released on December 2, 2022. This is the first original single produced by the trio since December 4th, 2018.

=== Into the Unknown (2023–present) ===
On 27 October 2023, Nero released their first solo original material in 5 years with "Truth", and announced it was the first single from their upcoming third studio album, Into the Unknown. The band subsequently released the next single, "Blame You" on 26 January 2024, and then the third single "Draw Energy" on 10 May 2024.

The band announced the release of Into the Unknown to be on 16 August 2024, as well as announcing a US tour beginning in September 2024. They then released the fourth and fifth singles, "Too Many Questions" and "Solar", on 21 June and 2 August, respectively.

== Other works ==
In December 2012, the band produced the song "Follow Me", for the British rock band Muse. The song's instrumental version (without vocals) was later used in the soundtrack of the 2013 blockbuster film World War Z, in the end credits.

In December 2018, the song "Lullaby" was released on the compilation album Ninjawerks: Vol. 1 under the record label Astralwerks in collaboration with American Twitch streamer Ninja.

== Discography ==
Studio albums

- Welcome Reality (2011)
- Between II Worlds (2015)
- Into the Unknown (2024)

== Awards and nominations ==
Grammy Awards
Year	Nominee / work	Award	Result
2013	"Promises" (Skrillex & Nero Remix)	Best Remixed Recording, Non - Classical	Won

Dubstep Music Awards North America
Year	Nominee / work	Award	Result
2012	Nero	Best International Dubstep Act	Won

Ivor Novello Awards
Year	Nominee / work	Award	Result
2011	"Promises"	Best Contemporary Song	Nominated

Q Awards
Year	Nominee / work	Award	Result
2011	Nero	Best New Act	Nominated

Dubstep Music Awards (UK)
Year	Nominee / work	Award	Result
2011	Welcome Reality	Best Album	Won

Drum & Bass Awards
Year	Nominee / work	Award	Result
2011	Nero	Best Dubstep Producers	Won
2011	Nero	Best Dubstep DJs	Won

Beatport Awards
Year	Nominee / work	Award	Result
2010	Nero	Best Dubstep Act	Won
2010	"Act Like You Know"	Best Dubstep Track	Won
